= New Plymouth Coastal Walkway =

New Zealand hiking trail

Coordinates: 39.05842°S 174.05199°E

Coastal Walkway
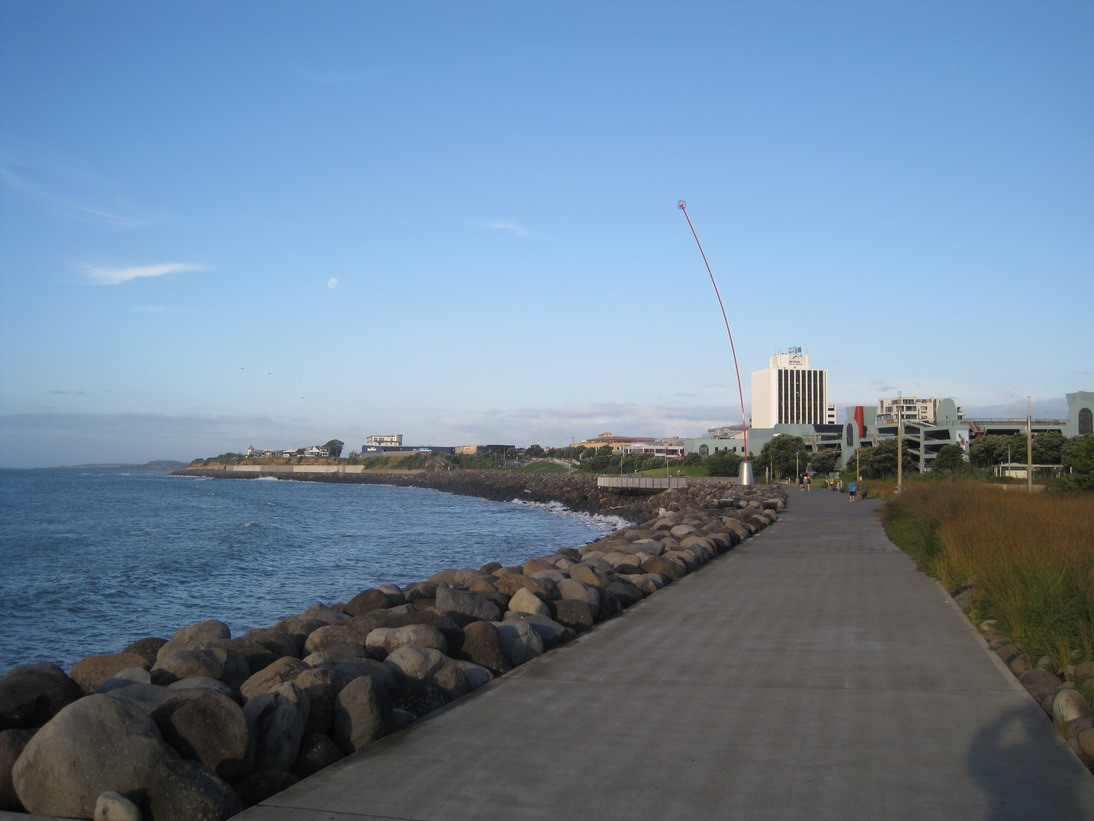
- The walkway near the Wind Wand.
- Length: 13.2 km (8.2 mi)
- Location: New Plymouth District, New Zealand
- Trailheads: Port Taranaki, Bell Block
- Use: Walking; Cycling
- Difficulty: Easy
- Surface: Paved
- Maintained by: New Plymouth District Council
- Website: npdc.govt.nz/leisure-and-culture/coastal-walkway

The Coastal Walkway is a 12.7-kilometre (7.9 mi) long walkway located along the coast of New Plymouth, New Zealand. The walkway stretches from near Port Taranaki, past the central city, through Hickford Park, past Bell Block Beach and to Tiromoana Crescent in Bell Block, north-east of New Plymouth. The walkway runs through a number of bridges, most notably, the Te Rewa Rewa Bridge.

== History ==
The Coastal Walkway is a foreshoreway constructed in 1999, along with the Wind Wand, originally as a 7-kilometre (4.3 mi) long walkway. In 2010, extensions were made to the walkway and an additional 3 kilometres were added, extending to Bell Block. The development was part of a joint programme by NPDC and NZTA to encourage and enable people to use active transport instead of motor vehicles. In 2014, the walkway was extended to Tiromoana Crescent in Bell Block bringing the length to 12.7 km. In 2016, the walkway was extended with the Mangati Pathway, linking the coastal route across Bell Block along the Mangati Reserve to SH3.

== Awards ==
The walkway has received numerous awards,

- New Zealand Recreation Association's Outstanding Project Award 2011 for the Coastal Walkway extension (comprising the pathway and Te Rewa Rewa Bridge).
- Roading Excellence Awards 2011 Supreme Award and Minor Road Project category for the extension of the Coastal Walkway to Bell Block (comprising the pathway and Te Rewa Rewa Bridge), from Roading New Zealand.
- The Aesthetics Medium Award 2011 (for bridges with spans between 30m and 75m long) at the Footbridge Awards in Poland, for Te Rewa Rewa Bridge.
- The Arthur G. Hayden Medal 2011 from the International Bridge Conference for Te Rewa Rewa Bridge, for outstanding achievement in bridge engineering that demonstrates innovation in special-use bridges.
- Boon Goldsmith Bhaskar Brebner Team Architecture won the Urban Category in the 2009 Western Architecture Awards by the New Zealand Institute of Architects for the construction of the Coastal Walkway's pedestrian railway overpass at the end of Liardet Street.
- LivCom Awards 2008 – Natural Section of the Environmentally Sustainable Projects Award (Gold)
- Gemini Cycle Friendly Awards 2008 – Best Cycle Facility Project Award (Coastal Pathway)
- NZ Institute of Landscape Architects – George Malcolm Award (2006)
- International Federation of Landscape Architects – Eastern Region Awards (2005)
- NZ Institute of Landscape Architects – Gold Award (2003)
- New Zealand Recreation Association – Outstanding Project Award (2003)
- New Zealand Institute of Architects – Resene Award for Architecture: Public Amenities, Foreshore Toilets (2002)
- Creative New Zealand, Creative Places Award – Judge's Citation (2002)
