= Waiwhakaiho =

Industrial area in New Plymouth, New Zealand

- Suburb
- Interactive map of Waiwhakaiho
- Coordinates: 39.043°S 174.125°E
- Country: New Zealand
- City: New Plymouth
- Local authority: New Plymouth District Council
- Electoral ward: Kaitake-Ngāmotu General Ward; Te Purutanga Mauri Pūmanawa Māori Ward

Area
  - Land: 747 ha (1,850 acres)

Population (June 2025)
  - Total: 190
  - Density: 25/km^{2} (66/sq mi)

	(North Taranaki Bight)	Bell Block
Fitzroy	Waiwhakaiho	Paraite
Glen Avon		Hillsborough

Waiwhakaiho is an industrial suburb of New Plymouth, in the Taranaki region, on the west coast of New Zealand's North Island.

It is located near the mouth of the Waiwhakaiho River, on the eastern side of the city.

Most housing was built in the 2010s.

A new walkway was also completed in Waiwhakiho in the 2010s.

== Demographics ==
Waiwhakaiho-Bell Block South statistical area covers 7.47 km^{2} (2.88 sq mi) and had an estimated population of 190 as of June 2025, with a population density of 25 people per km^{2}.

Historical population
Year	Pop.	±% p.a.
2006	123	—
2013	162	+4.01%
2018	153	−1.14%
2023	177	+2.96%
The 2006 population is for a smaller area of 7.35 km^{2}. Source:

Waiwhakaiho-Bell Block South had a population of 177 in the 2023 New Zealand census, an increase of 24 people (15.7%) since the 2018 census, and an increase of 15 people (9.3%) since the 2013 census. There were 96 males and 81 females in 72 dwellings. 1.7% of people identified as LGBTIQ+. The median age was 34.7 years (compared with 38.1 years nationally). There were 36 people (20.3%) aged under 15 years, 36 (20.3%) aged 15 to 29, 87 (49.2%) aged 30 to 64, and 21 (11.9%) aged 65 or older.

People could identify as more than one ethnicity. The results were 83.1% European (Pākehā); 28.8% Māori; 1.7% Pasifika; 11.9% Asian; and 1.7% Middle Eastern, Latin American and African New Zealanders (MELAA). English was spoken by 96.6%, Māori by 5.1%, and other languages by 6.8%. No language could be spoken by 3.4% (e.g. too young to talk). The percentage of people born overseas was 15.3, compared with 28.8% nationally.

Religious affiliations were 22.0% Christian, 3.4% Hindu, 1.7% Buddhist, and 3.4% other religions. People who answered that they had no religion were 50.8%, and 18.6% of people did not answer the census question.

Of those at least 15 years old, 18 (12.8%) people had a bachelor's or higher degree, 102 (72.3%) had a post-high school certificate or diploma, and 30 (21.3%) people exclusively held high school qualifications. The median income was $40,600, compared with $41,500 nationally. 9 people (6.4%) earned over $100,000 compared to 12.1% nationally. The employment status of those at least 15 was 84 (59.6%) full-time, 18 (12.8%) part-time, and 9 (6.4%) unemployed.

== Marae ==
Katere Ki-Te-Moana Marae, a meeting place for the Te Āti Awa hapū of Ngāti Tāwhirikura, is located on Cody Place.

New Plymouth District Council received a grant request from the marae in 2017.

In October 2020, the Government committed $264,935 from the Provincial Growth Fund to upgrade the marae, creating an estimated 15 jobs.

== Economy ==
The Valley Mega Centre opened in Waiwhakaiho in 2006. It has five tenants: Mitre 10 Mega, Countdown, Rebel Sport, Briscoes and Noel Leeming.

== Transport ==
Devon Road, part of State Highway 3, travels through Waiwhakaiho running east towards Bell Block and west towards Fitzroy. Citylink buses connect the suburb to both locations.

Kiwirail's Smart Road freight terminal is located at the Southern edge of Waiwhakaiho. The former Egmont Road railway station also served the area before closing in 1959.
