= East End, New Zealand =

Coordinates: 39.049°S 174.093°E

East End is a coastal suburb of New Plymouth, in the western North Island of New Zealand. It is located to the east of the city centre, north of Strandon, and west of Fitzroy. One of New Plymouth's main roads, Devon Street East, forms an approximate southern boundary of the suburb.

East End's most prominent feature is the East End Reserve, an area of open and wooded parkland. Nearby are the East End Surf Lifesaving Club and an inline hockey arena.
