= Welbourn, New Zealand =

Suburb of New Plymouth, New Zealand

Welbourn
- Suburb
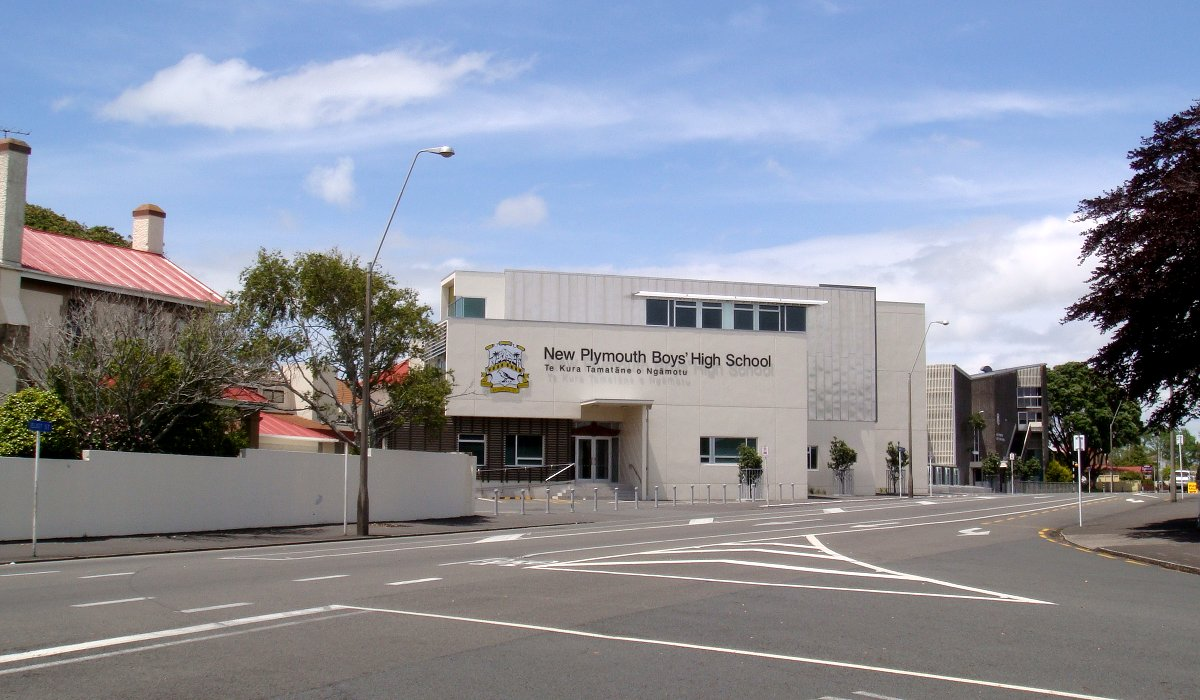
- New Plymouth Boys' High School
- Interactive map of Welbourn
- Coordinates: 39°4′10″S 174°5′31″E
- Country: New Zealand
- City: New Plymouth
- Local authority: New Plymouth District Council
- Electoral ward: Kaitake-Ngāmotu General Ward; Kōhanga Moa General Ward; Te Purutanga Mauri Pūmanawa Māori Ward

Area
  - Land: 687 ha (1,700 acres)

Population (June 2025)
  - Total: 3,470
  - Density: 505/km^{2} (1,310/sq mi)

New Plymouth Central	Strandon	Merrilands
Brooklands	Welbourn
Brooklands		Highlands Park

Welbourn (often misspelled Welbourne) is a suburb of New Plymouth, in the western North Island of New Zealand. It is located to the southeast of the city centre. Te Hēnui Stream runs through the suburb and State Highway 3 forms its western boundary.

The suburb began as a railway settlement.

== Demographics ==
Welbourn covers 6.87 km^{2} (2.65 sq mi) and had an estimated population of 3,470 as of June 2025, with a population density of 505 people per km^{2}.

Historical population
Year	Pop.	±% p.a.
2006	2,796	—
2013	3,015	+1.08%
2018	3,276	+1.67%
2023	3,330	+0.33%
The 2006 population is for a smaller area of 6.49 km^{2}. Source:

Welbourn had a population of 3,330 in the 2023 New Zealand census, an increase of 54 people (1.6%) since the 2018 census, and an increase of 315 people (10.4%) since the 2013 census. There were 1,641 males, 1,680 females, and 6 people of other genders in 1,290 dwellings. 3.2% of people identified as LGBTIQ+. The median age was 41.3 years (compared with 38.1 years nationally). There were 585 people (17.6%) aged under 15 years, 606 (18.2%) aged 15 to 29, 1,476 (44.3%) aged 30 to 64, and 660 (19.8%) aged 65 or older.

People could identify as more than one ethnicity. The results were 83.1% European (Pākehā); 16.8% Māori; 2.8% Pasifika; 9.2% Asian; 0.6% Middle Eastern, Latin American and African New Zealanders (MELAA); and 2.4% other, which includes people giving their ethnicity as "New Zealander". English was spoken by 97.2%, Māori by 3.4%, Samoan by 0.5%, and other languages by 9.9%. No language could be spoken by 2.1% (e.g. too young to talk). New Zealand Sign Language was known by 0.4%. The percentage of people born overseas was 20.4, compared with 28.8% nationally.

Religious affiliations were 34.1% Christian, 1.5% Hindu, 1.0% Islam, 0.8% Māori religious beliefs, 0.5% Buddhist, 0.4% New Age, and 1.6% other religions. People who answered that they had no religion were 52.8%, and 7.3% of people did not answer the census question.

Of those at least 15 years old, 690 (25.1%) people had a bachelor's or higher degree, 1,458 (53.1%) had a post-high school certificate or diploma, and 600 (21.9%) people exclusively held high school qualifications. The median income was $38,500, compared with $41,500 nationally. 360 people (13.1%) earned over $100,000 compared to 12.1% nationally. The employment status of those at least 15 was 1,254 (45.7%) full-time, 459 (16.7%) part-time, and 69 (2.5%) unemployed.

== Education ==
The Western Institute of Technology at Taranaki has its main campus in Welbourn.

New Plymouth Boys' High School is a single-sex state secondary school (years 9–13) with a roll of 1503 students. The school was built as New Plymouth High School in 1882 and was initially only for boys. It became co-educational in 1885, although the girls were taught separately for the first two years. The girls separated from New Plymouth High School in 1914, forming New Plymouth Girls' High School in Strandon, leaving New Plymouth Boys' High School on the old site.

Central School Te Kura Waenga o Ngāmotu is a coeducational contributing primary (years 1–6) schools with a roll of 258. Central School opened in 1884 and is one of the oldest schools in the region.

Welbourn School is a coeducational contributing primary (years 1-6) school with a roll of 325 students. It was built on railway reserve land in 1932 and celebrated its 75th jubilee in 2008.

Rolls are as of July 2025.
