= Glen Avon, New Zealand =

Suburb of New Plymouth, New Zealand

Glen Avon
- Suburb
- Interactive map of Glen Avon
- Coordinates: 39.056°S 174.111°E
- Country: New Zealand
- City: New Plymouth
- Local authority: New Plymouth District Council
- Electoral ward: Kaitake-Ngāmotu General Ward; Kōhanga Moa General Ward; Te Purutanga Mauri Pūmanawa Māori Ward

Area
  - Land: 871 ha (2,150 acres)

Population (June 2025)
  - Total: 1,430
  - Density: 164/km^{2} (425/sq mi)

| Strandon | Fitzroy | Waiwhakaiho |
| Merrilands | Glen Avon | Paraite |
| Highlands Park | | Hillsborough |

Glen Avon is a suburb of New Plymouth, in the western North Island of New Zealand. It is located to the south-east of the city centre. Waiwhakaiho River separates Glen Avon from the suburbs of Highlands Park, Merrilands and Strandon to the west, and State Highway 3 separates it from Fitzroy and Waihakaiho to the north.

== Demographics ==
Glen Avon covers 8.71 km^{2} (3.36 sq mi) and had an estimated population of 1,430 as of June 2025, with a population density of 164 people per km^{2}.

Historical population
| Year | Pop. | ±% p.a. |
|---|---|---|
| 2013 | 1,047 | — |
| 2018 | 1,221 | +3.12% |
| 2023 | 1,365 | +2.25% |

Glen Avon had a population of 1,365 in the 2023 New Zealand census, an increase of 144 people (11.8%) since the 2018 census, and an increase of 318 people (30.4%) since the 2013 census. There were 675 males, 687 females, and 3 people of other genders in 519 dwellings. 1.5% of people identified as LGBTIQ+. The median age was 42.9 years (compared with 38.1 years nationally). There were 261 people (19.1%) aged under 15 years, 237 (17.4%) aged 15 to 29, 612 (44.8%) aged 30 to 64, and 258 (18.9%) aged 65 or older.

People could identify as more than one ethnicity. The results were 88.6% European (Pākehā); 17.1% Māori; 3.7% Pasifika; 4.2% Asian; 0.7% Middle Eastern, Latin American and African New Zealanders (MELAA); and 2.6% other, which includes people giving their ethnicity as "New Zealander". English was spoken by 98.0%, Māori by 2.2%, Samoan by 0.4%, and other languages by 5.9%. No language could be spoken by 1.8% (e.g. too young to talk). New Zealand Sign Language was known by 0.4%. The percentage of people born overseas was 14.7, compared with 28.8% nationally.

Religious affiliations were 30.5% Christian, 0.9% Hindu, 0.4% Māori religious beliefs, 0.4% Buddhist, 0.4% Jewish, and 1.1% other religions. People who answered that they had no religion were 58.7%, and 7.9% of people did not answer the census question.

Of those at least 15 years old, 213 (19.3%) people had a bachelor's or higher degree, 669 (60.6%) had a post-high school certificate or diploma, and 222 (20.1%) people exclusively held high school qualifications. The median income was $42,800, compared with $41,500 nationally. 132 people (12.0%) earned over $100,000 compared to 12.1% nationally. The employment status of those at least 15 was 552 (50.0%) full-time, 192 (17.4%) part-time, and 27 (2.4%) unemployed.
