= Paraite =

Rural community in Taranaki, New Zealand

- Rural community
- Interactive map of Paraite
- Coordinates: 39.044°S 174.154°E
- Country: New Zealand
- Region: Taranaki Region
- Territorial authority: New Plymouth District
- Ward: Kaitake-Ngāmotu General Ward; Kōhanga Moa General Ward; Te Purutanga Mauri Pūmanawa Māori Ward
- Community: Puketapu-Bell Block Community
- Electorates: New Plymouth; Te Tai Hauāuru (Māori)

Government
  - Territorial Authority: New Plymouth District Council
  - Regional council: Taranaki Regional Council
  - Mayor of New Plymouth: Max Brough
  - New Plymouth MP: David MacLeod
  - Te Tai Hauāuru MP: Debbie Ngarewa-Packer

Area
  - Total: 15.94 km^{2} (6.15 sq mi)

Population (June 2025)
  - Total: 1,040
  - Density: 65.2/km^{2} (169/sq mi)
- Postcode(s): 4373

Paraite is a rural community in the New Plymouth District and Taranaki region of New Zealand's North Island. The area is east of New Plymouth and south of Bell Block. The Marton–New Plymouth line separates Paraite from the industrial area of Bell Block.

Around 1860, during the First Taranaki War, a Māori chief named Aporo or Aparo confronted Charles Everett, a farmer at Paraite. Instead of shooting him, he removed Everett's tie and told him to leave. This was an unusual act of mercy for the time.

The area was divided into allotments for sale in 1867.

== Demographics ==
Paraite statistical area covers 15.94 km^{2} (6.15 sq mi) and had an estimated population of 1,040 as of June 2025, with a population density of 65 people per km^{2}.

Historical population
Year	Pop.	±% p.a.
2006	561	—
2013	792	+5.05%
2018	897	+2.52%
2023	996	+2.12%
The 2006 population is for a smaller area of 13.72 km^{2}. Source:

Paraite had a population of 996 in the 2023 New Zealand census, an increase of 99 people (11.0%) since the 2018 census, and an increase of 204 people (25.8%) since the 2013 census. There were 486 males and 510 females in 366 dwellings. 1.8% of people identified as LGBTIQ+. The median age was 45.3 years (compared with 38.1 years nationally). There were 192 people (19.3%) aged under 15 years, 153 (15.4%) aged 15 to 29, 468 (47.0%) aged 30 to 64, and 189 (19.0%) aged 65 or older.

People could identify as more than one ethnicity. The results were 90.1% European (Pākehā); 13.6% Māori; 0.9% Pasifika; 3.9% Asian; 0.6% Middle Eastern, Latin American and African New Zealanders (MELAA); and 3.0% other, which includes people giving their ethnicity as "New Zealander". English was spoken by 98.5%, Māori by 2.4%, Samoan by 0.3%, and other languages by 4.8%. No language could be spoken by 1.5% (e.g. too young to talk). New Zealand Sign Language was known by 0.6%. The percentage of people born overseas was 12.7, compared with 28.8% nationally.

Religious affiliations were 26.2% Christian, 0.9% Hindu, 0.6% Islam, 0.3% Māori religious beliefs, 0.3% New Age, and 0.6% other religions. People who answered that they had no religion were 62.7%, and 8.7% of people did not answer the census question.

Of those at least 15 years old, 141 (17.5%) people had a bachelor's or higher degree, 498 (61.9%) had a post-high school certificate or diploma, and 177 (22.0%) people exclusively held high school qualifications. The median income was $45,000, compared with $41,500 nationally. 108 people (13.4%) earned over $100,000 compared to 12.1% nationally. The employment status of those at least 15 was 402 (50.0%) full-time, 156 (19.4%) part-time, and 9 (1.1%) unemployed.
