= Merrilands =

Suburb of New Plymouth, New Zealand

- Suburb
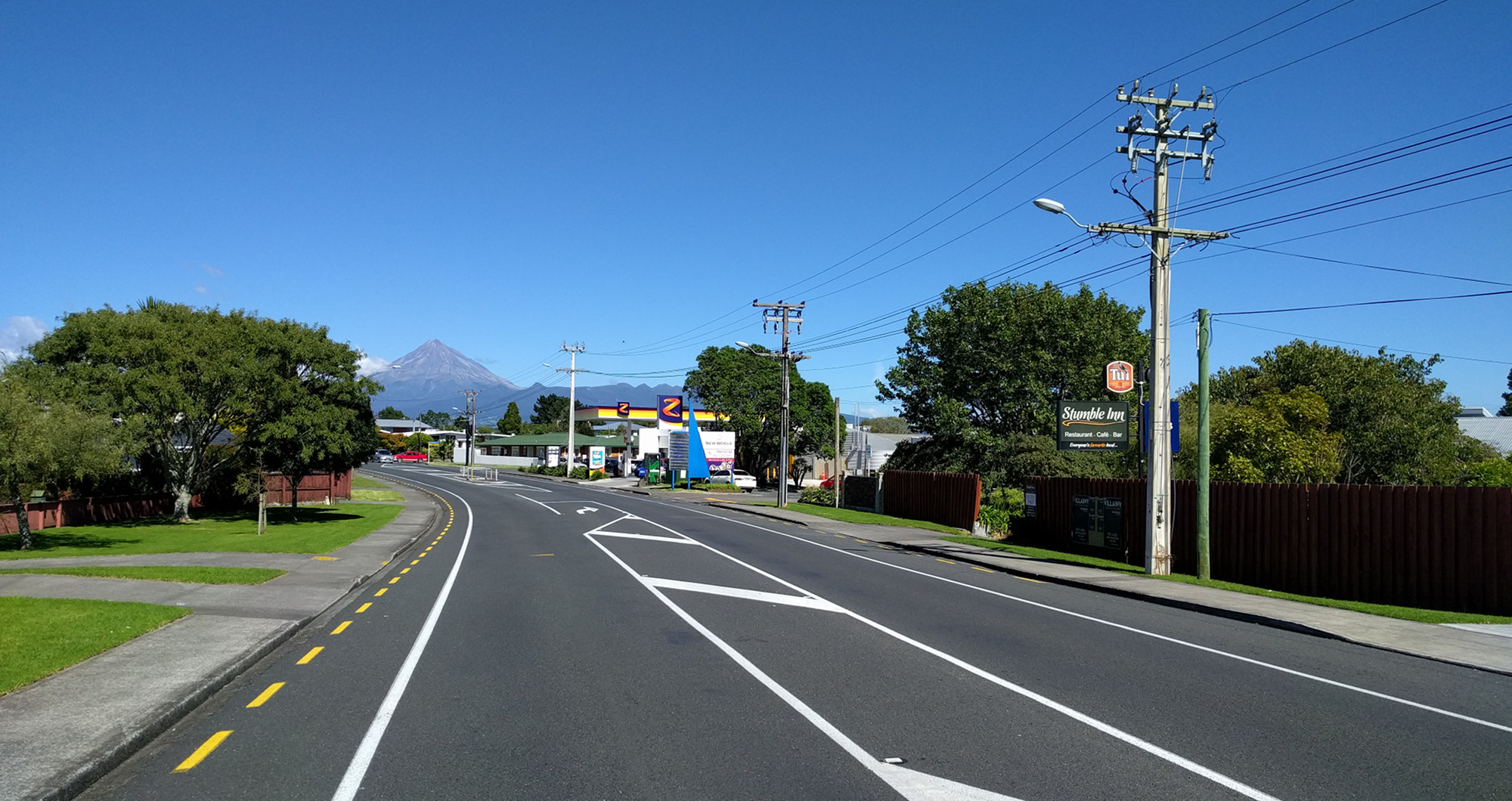
- Merrilands shopping centre on Mangorei Road
- Interactive map of Merrilands
- Coordinates: 39°3′56″S 174°6′19″E
- Country: New Zealand
- City: New Plymouth
- Local authority: New Plymouth District Council
- Electoral ward: Kaitake-Ngāmotu General Ward; Te Purutanga Mauri Pūmanawa Māori Ward

Area
  - Land: 173 ha (430 acres)

Population (June 2025)
  - Total: 3,130
  - Density: 1,810/km^{2} (4,690/sq mi)

Strandon	Fitzroy	Glen Avon
	Merrilands
Welbourn	Highlands Park

Merrilands is a suburb of New Plymouth, in the western North Island of New Zealand. It is located to the south-east of the city centre. The Waiwhakaiho River runs past Merrilands to the east, and Te Hēnui Stream runs past to the west.

== Demographics ==
Merrilands covers 1.73 km^{2} (0.67 sq mi) and had an estimated population of 3,130 as of June 2025, with a population density of 1,809 people per km^{2}.

Historical population
Year	Pop.	±% p.a.
2006	2,787	—
2013	2,811	+0.12%
2018	2,925	+0.80%
2023	3,039	+0.77%

Merrilands had a population of 3,039 in the 2023 New Zealand census, an increase of 114 people (3.9%) since the 2018 census, and an increase of 228 people (8.1%) since the 2013 census. There were 1,464 males, 1,563 females, and 12 people of other genders in 1,209 dwellings. 2.4% of people identified as LGBTIQ+. The median age was 40.4 years (compared with 38.1 years nationally). There were 570 people (18.8%) aged under 15 years, 537 (17.7%) aged 15 to 29, 1,263 (41.6%) aged 30 to 64, and 672 (22.1%) aged 65 or older.

People could identify as more than one ethnicity. The results were 81.6% European (Pākehā); 18.7% Māori; 4.4% Pasifika; 7.1% Asian; 1.2% Middle Eastern, Latin American and African New Zealanders (MELAA); and 2.2% other, which includes people giving their ethnicity as "New Zealander". English was spoken by 96.8%, Māori by 3.6%, Samoan by 0.3%, and other languages by 8.6%. No language could be spoken by 2.0% (e.g. too young to talk). New Zealand Sign Language was known by 0.6%. The percentage of people born overseas was 19.5, compared with 28.8% nationally.

Religious affiliations were 32.9% Christian, 1.1% Hindu, 1.0% Islam, 0.4% Māori religious beliefs, 0.4% Buddhist, 0.4% New Age, 0.1% Jewish, and 1.1% other religions. People who answered that they had no religion were 54.8%, and 8.1% of people did not answer the census question.

Of those at least 15 years old, 525 (21.3%) people had a bachelor's or higher degree, 1,335 (54.1%) had a post-high school certificate or diploma, and 606 (24.5%) people exclusively held high school qualifications. The median income was $37,400, compared with $41,500 nationally. 273 people (11.1%) earned over $100,000 compared to 12.1% nationally. The employment status of those at least 15 was 1,176 (47.6%) full-time, 315 (12.8%) part-time, and 51 (2.1%) unemployed.

== Education ==
Merrilands School is a coeducational contributing primary (years 1–6) school with a roll of 139 students as of July 2026. The school was established in 1960.

== Commerce ==
There is one main shopping centre located in Merrilands. This is located on the corner of Cumberland Street and Mangorei Road. Shops include a Lotto and Post Shop, New World supermarket, pharmacy, hair salon, dentist, medical centre, along with a fuel station. A smaller group of shops, including a dairy and bakery, are at the intersection of Mangorei Road and Karaka Street.
