= Highlands Park, New Plymouth =

Suburb of New Plymouth, New Zealand

Highlands Park
- Suburb
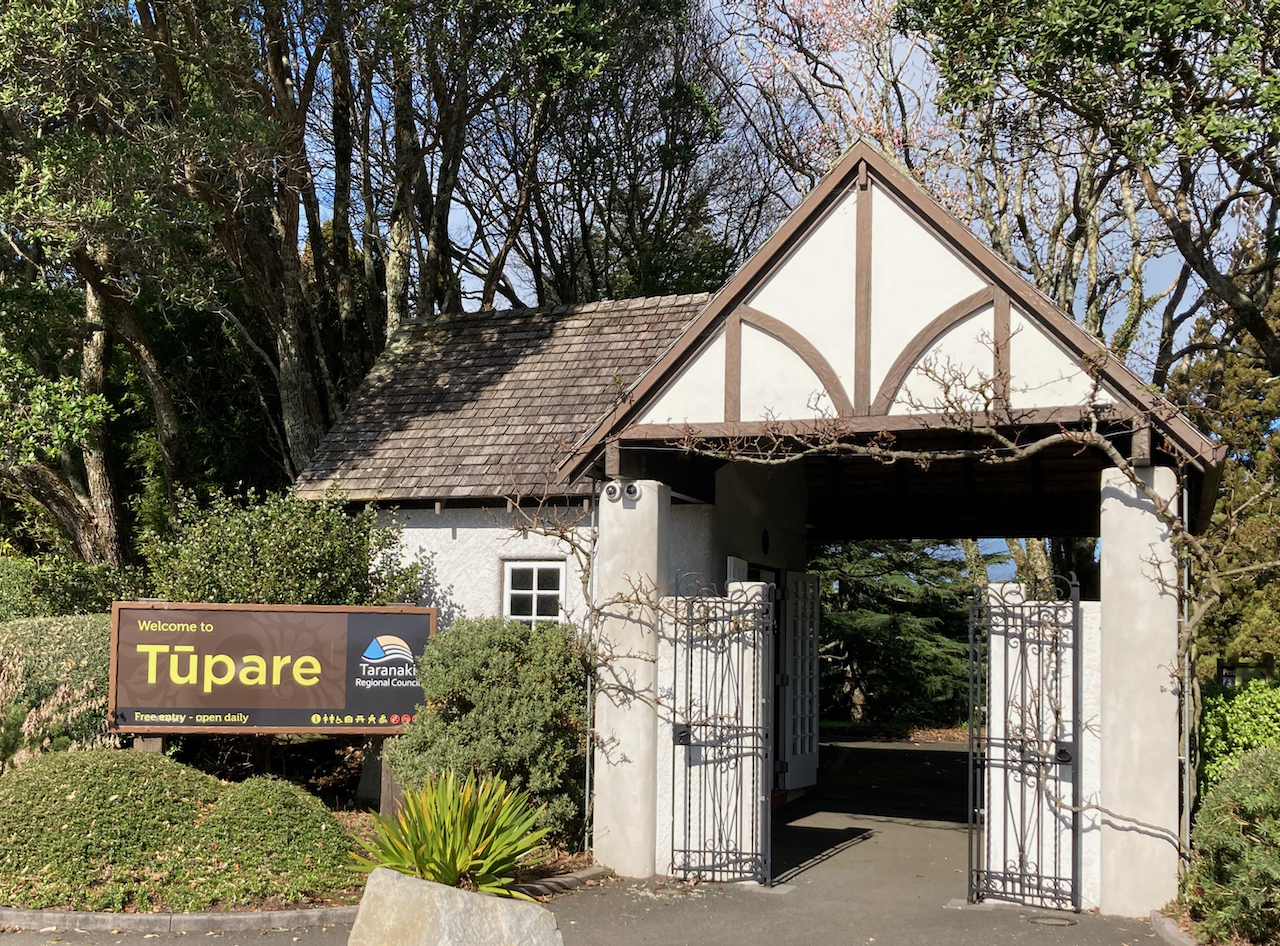
- Tūpare garden
- Interactive map of Highlands Park
- Coordinates: 39.0831782°S 174.0975057°E
- Country: New Zealand
- City: New Plymouth
- Local authority: New Plymouth District Council
- Electoral ward: Kaitake-Ngāmotu General Ward; Te Purutanga Mauri Pūmanawa Māori Ward

Area
  - Land: 292 ha (720 acres)

Population (June 2025)
  - Total: 3,370
  - Density: 1,150/km^{2} (2,990/sq mi)

Welbourn	Merrilands	Glen Avon
Vogeltown	Highlands Park
Ridgewood		Burgess Park

Highlands Park is a suburb of the New Zealand city of New Plymouth. Tūpare, Mangorei School and Ngahere Reserve are notable features within the suburb which borders the Waiwhakaiho River.

== History ==
In 2011, a local chapter of the Exclusive Brethren proposed building a church in Highlands Park, near most of their 40 members lived nearby. Three nearby residents supported the proposal, but three others opposed it. The New Plymouth District Council declined the proposal due to noise concerns, but the Brethren appealed to the Environment Court.

As of February 2019, an audit by Taranaki Regional Council found Highlands Park had low levels of recycling contamination, compared to most other New Plymouth suburbs.

In June 2019, a man was arrested on arson charges, after a fire broke out in his Highlands Park home.

In September 2019, a worker at a Highlands Park rest home began taking her newborn black lamb to entertain residents.

== Demographics ==
Highlands Park covers 2.92 km^{2} (1.13 sq mi) and had an estimated population of 3,370 as of June 2025, with a population density of 1,154 people per km^{2}.

Historical population
Year	Pop.	±% p.a.
2006	2,490	—
2013	3,009	+2.74%
2018	3,318	+1.97%
2023	3,387	+0.41%

Highlands Park (New Plymouth District) had a population of 3,387 in the 2023 New Zealand census, an increase of 69 people (2.1%) since the 2018 census, and an increase of 378 people (12.6%) since the 2013 census. There were 1,620 males, 1,758 females, and 9 people of other genders in 1,278 dwellings. 2.5% of people identified as LGBTIQ+. The median age was 50.3 years (compared with 38.1 years nationally). There were 567 people (16.7%) aged under 15 years, 408 (12.0%) aged 15 to 29, 1,425 (42.1%) aged 30 to 64, and 987 (29.1%) aged 65 or older.

People could identify as more than one ethnicity. The results were 87.2% European (Pākehā); 8.5% Māori; 0.9% Pasifika; 9.4% Asian; 1.5% Middle Eastern, Latin American and African New Zealanders (MELAA); and 2.7% other, which includes people giving their ethnicity as "New Zealander". English was spoken by 98.0%, Māori by 1.7%, and other languages by 10.6%. No language could be spoken by 1.0% (e.g. too young to talk). New Zealand Sign Language was known by 0.4%. The percentage of people born overseas was 22.2, compared with 28.8% nationally.

Religious affiliations were 38.3% Christian, 1.4% Hindu, 1.4% Islam, 0.2% Māori religious beliefs, 0.8% Buddhist, 0.2% New Age, 0.1% Jewish, and 0.8% other religions. People who answered that they had no religion were 48.3%, and 8.8% of people did not answer the census question.

Of those at least 15 years old, 726 (25.7%) people had a bachelor's or higher degree, 1,479 (52.4%) had a post-high school certificate or diploma, and 612 (21.7%) people exclusively held high school qualifications. The median income was $41,500, compared with $41,500 nationally. 462 people (16.4%) earned over $100,000 compared to 12.1% nationally. The employment status of those at least 15 was 1,209 (42.9%) full-time, 417 (14.8%) part-time, and 45 (1.6%) unemployed.
