= Wind Wand =

Kinetic sculpture in New Plymouth, New Zealand

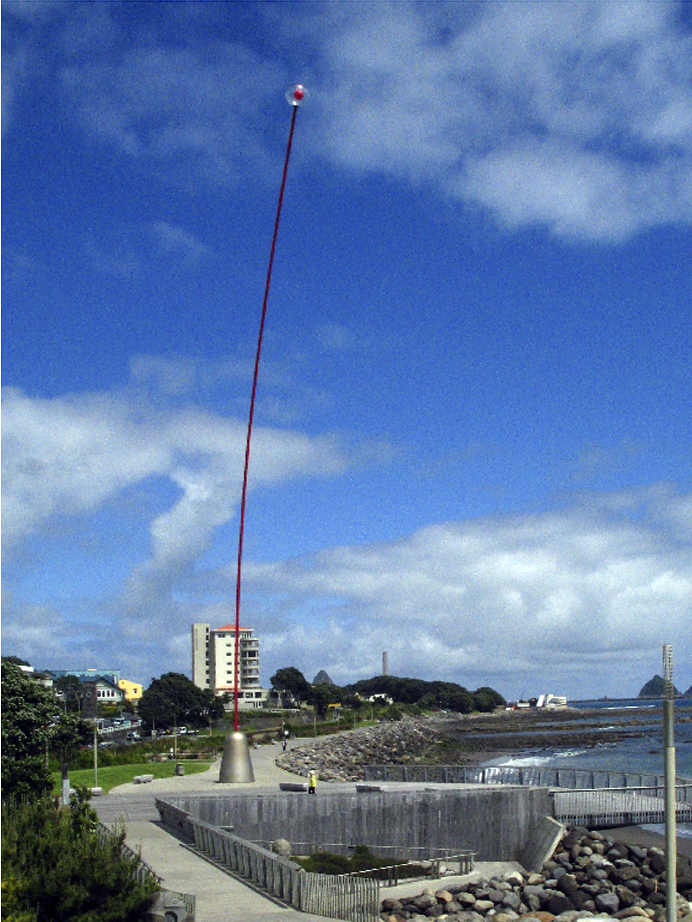
- Artist: Len Lye
- Year: 1997–98 (groundbreaking); 1998–99 (constructed); 1 January 2000 (opened)
- Type: Kinetic sculpture
- Dimensions: 48 m (157 ft) high 200 mm (7.9 in) diameter
- Location: New Plymouth, New Zealand; 39.056056°S 174.071736°E

The Wind Wand is a 48-metre-tall (157 ft) kinetic sculpture located in New Plymouth, New Zealand. The sculpture includes a 45-metre-long (148 ft) tube of red fibreglass, and was made to designs by artist Len Lye. To residents, it is one of the main icons of New Plymouth. During the night, the Wind Wand lights up.

Costing over $300,000, it was originally installed in December 1999, along with the Coastal Walkway. It had to be taken down within weeks. After repairs, it was reinstalled in June 2001. The red fibreglass tube stands vertically in still air, but bends in the wind.

On 17 September 2017, the Wind Wand was struck by lightning, remaining intact.

== Materials ==
The Wind Wand is constructed out of fibreglass and carbon fibre. It weighs around 900 kilograms (2,000 lb) and has a diameter of 200 millimetres (7.9 in). The Wind Wand can bend at least 20 metres (66 ft). The red sphere on the top contains 1,296 light-emitting diodes.

== See also ==
- Zephyrometer
