= Fitzroy, New Plymouth =

Suburb of New Plymouth, New Zealand

Fitzroy
- Suburb
- Interactive map of Fitzroy
- Coordinates: 39°2′49″S 174°6′17″E
- Country: New Zealand
- City: New Plymouth
- Local authority: New Plymouth District Council
- Electoral ward: Kaitake-Ngāmotu General Ward; Te Purutanga Mauri Pūmanawa Māori Ward

Area
  - Land: 165 ha (410 acres)

Population (June 2025)
  - Total: 2,210
  - Density: 1,340/km^{2} (3,470/sq mi)

(North Taranaki Bight)	(North Taranaki Bight)	Bell Block
Strandon	Fitzroy
	Merrilands	Glen Avon

Fitzroy (Māori: Poutūtaki) is a coastal suburb of New Plymouth, in the western North Island of New Zealand. It is located to the north-east of the city centre.

The area was initially named the Fitzroy Block after Governor Robert FitzRoy reduced the land purchased by the Plymouth Company from local Māori from 25,000 hectares (62,000 acres) to 1,500 hectares (3,700 acres) in the mid-1840s.

Holy Trinity Church in Henui Street is listed as a Category I structure with Heritage New Zealand.

== Demographics ==
Fitzroy covers 1.65 km^{2} (0.64 sq mi) and had an estimated population of 2,210 as of June 2025, with a population density of 1,339 people per km^{2}.

Historical population
Year	Pop.	±% p.a.
2013	2,013	—
2018	2,037	+0.24%
2023	2,127	+0.87%

Fitzroy (New Plymouth District) had a population of 2,127 in the 2023 New Zealand census, an increase of 90 people (4.4%) since the 2018 census, and an increase of 114 people (5.7%) since the 2013 census. There were 1,035 males, 1,086 females, and 6 people of other genders in 879 dwellings. 2.4% of people identified as LGBTIQ+. The median age was 42.6 years (compared with 38.1 years nationally). There were 435 people (20.5%) aged under 15 years, 294 (13.8%) aged 15 to 29, 1,011 (47.5%) aged 30 to 64, and 390 (18.3%) aged 65 or older.

People could identify as more than one ethnicity. The results were 86.6% European (Pākehā); 18.5% Māori; 2.4% Pasifika; 6.8% Asian; 1.6% Middle Eastern, Latin American and African New Zealanders (MELAA); and 2.1% other, which includes people giving their ethnicity as "New Zealander". English was spoken by 98.0%, Māori by 4.7%, Samoan by 0.4%, and other languages by 7.8%. No language could be spoken by 1.7% (e.g. too young to talk). New Zealand Sign Language was known by 0.3%. The percentage of people born overseas was 19.3, compared with 28.8% nationally.

Religious affiliations were 31.3% Christian, 0.6% Hindu, 1.0% Islam, 0.6% Māori religious beliefs, 0.7% Buddhist, 0.4% New Age, and 1.3% other religions. People who answered that they had no religion were 57.1%, and 7.1% of people did not answer the census question.

Of those at least 15 years old, 444 (26.2%) people had a bachelor's or higher degree, 885 (52.3%) had a post-high school certificate or diploma, and 366 (21.6%) people exclusively held high school qualifications. The median income was $42,400, compared with $41,500 nationally. 270 people (16.0%) earned over $100,000 compared to 12.1% nationally. The employment status of those at least 15 was 813 (48.0%) full-time, 252 (14.9%) part-time, and 39 (2.3%) unemployed.

== Education ==
Fitzroy School is a coeducational contributing primary (years 1–6) school with a roll of 416 students as of July 2025. The school celebrated its 125th jubilee in 2007.

St John Bosco School is a coeducational contributing primary (years 1–6) school with a roll of 257 students as of July 2025. It is a state integrated Catholic school, established in 1942.

== Transport ==
Northgate, part of State Highway 3, travels through the southern edge of Fitzroy. Regular Citylink buses connect the suburb to central New Plymouth and the towns of Bell Block and Waitara.

Fitzroy railway station was located to the west of Fitzroy in Strandon and closed in 1963.
