= Strandon =

Suburb of New Plymouth, New Zealand

- Suburb
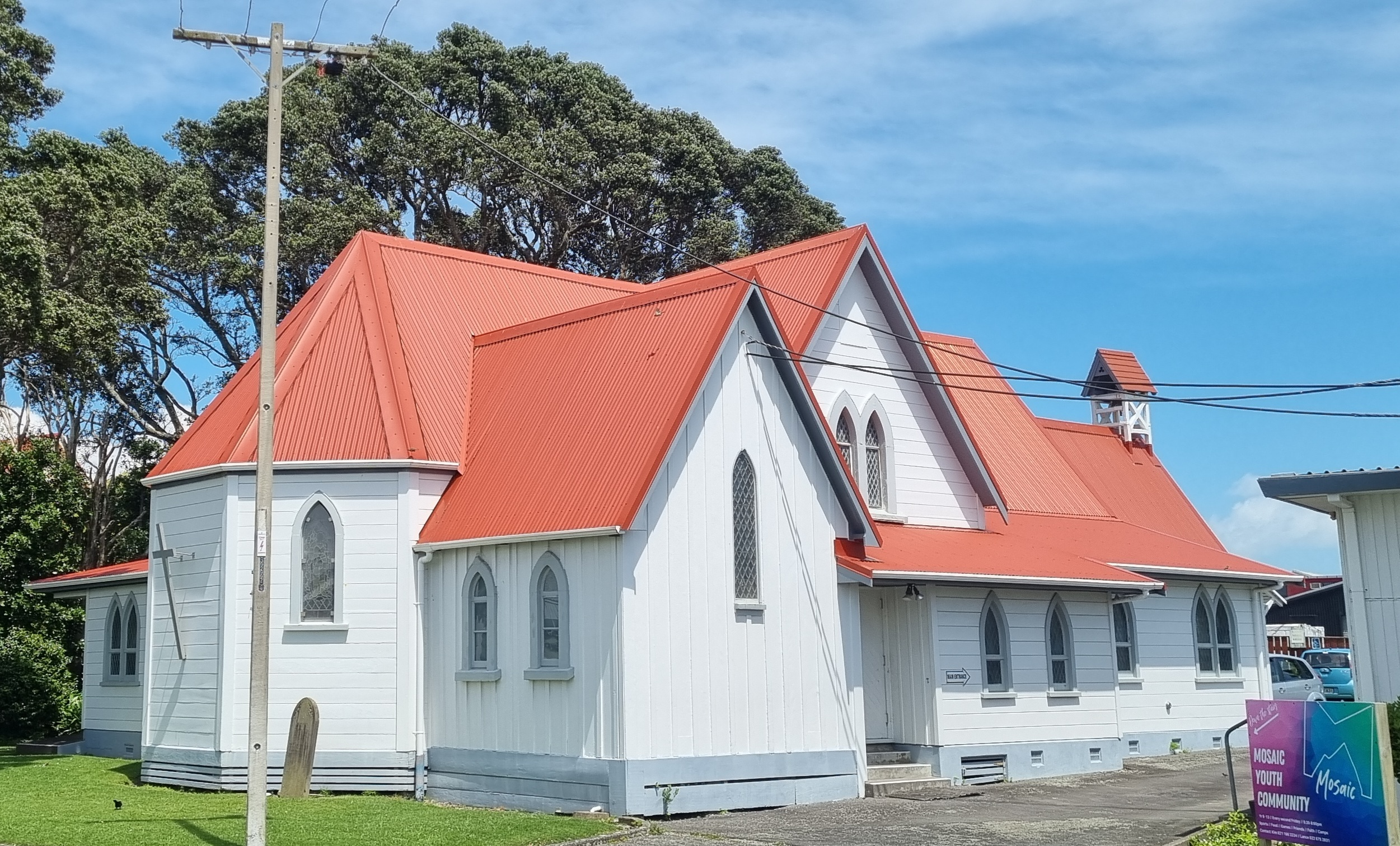
- Holy Trinity Church
- Interactive map of Strandon
- Coordinates: 39.054°S 174.094°E
- Country: New Zealand
- City: New Plymouth
- Local authority: New Plymouth District Council
- Electoral ward: Kaitake-Ngāmotu General Ward; Te Purutanga Mauri Pūmanawa Māori Ward

Area
  - Land: 176 ha (430 acres)

Population (June 2025)
  - Total: 2,650
  - Density: 1,510/km^{2} (3,900/sq mi)

	(North Taranaki Bight)	Fitzroy
New Plymouth Central	Strandon	Glen Avon
Welbourn	Merrilands

Strandon is a suburb of New Plymouth, in the western North Island of New Zealand. It is located to the east of the city centre.

== Demographics ==
Strandon covers 1.76 km^{2} (0.68 sq mi) and had an estimated population of 2,650 as of June 2025, with a population density of 1,506 people per km^{2}.

Historical population
Year	Pop.	±% p.a.
2006	2,487	—
2013	2,514	+0.15%
2018	2,535	+0.17%
2023	2,592	+0.45%

Strandon had a population of 2,592 in the 2023 New Zealand census, an increase of 57 people (2.2%) since the 2018 census, and an increase of 78 people (3.1%) since the 2013 census. There were 1,233 males, 1,353 females, and 6 people of other genders in 1,071 dwellings. 2.7% of people identified as LGBTIQ+. The median age was 46.5 years (compared with 38.1 years nationally). There were 414 people (16.0%) aged under 15 years, 411 (15.9%) aged 15 to 29, 1,125 (43.4%) aged 30 to 64, and 645 (24.9%) aged 65 or older.

People could identify as more than one ethnicity. The results were 87.2% European (Pākehā); 14.4% Māori; 1.4% Pasifika; 7.2% Asian; 0.9% Middle Eastern, Latin American and African New Zealanders (MELAA); and 2.0% other, which includes people giving their ethnicity as "New Zealander". English was spoken by 97.9%, Māori by 1.7%, Samoan by 0.1%, and other languages by 8.7%. No language could be spoken by 1.7% (e.g. too young to talk). New Zealand Sign Language was known by 0.3%. The percentage of people born overseas was 19.4, compared with 28.8% nationally.

Religious affiliations were 35.6% Christian, 2.0% Hindu, 1.2% Islam, 0.1% Māori religious beliefs, 0.6% Buddhist, 0.2% New Age, and 0.9% other religions. People who answered that they had no religion were 52.4%, and 7.1% of people did not answer the census question.

Of those at least 15 years old, 597 (27.4%) people had a bachelor's or higher degree, 1,173 (53.9%) had a post-high school certificate or diploma, and 405 (18.6%) people exclusively held high school qualifications. The median income was $44,000, compared with $41,500 nationally. 351 people (16.1%) earned over $100,000 compared to 12.1% nationally. The employment status of those at least 15 was 1,023 (47.0%) full-time, 378 (17.4%) part-time, and 36 (1.7%) unemployed.

== Education ==
New Plymouth Girls' High School is a single-sex state secondary school (years 9–13) with a roll of 1297 students as of July 2025. The school separated from New Plymouth High School in 1914, leaving New Plymouth Boys' High School on the old site.

Sacred Heart Girls' College is a single-sex state-integrated Catholic secondary and intermediate school (years 7–13) with a roll of 738 students as of July 2025. The school started in 1884 and moved to its current site in 1960.
