= New Plymouth =

New Plymouth Ngāmotu (Māori)
- City
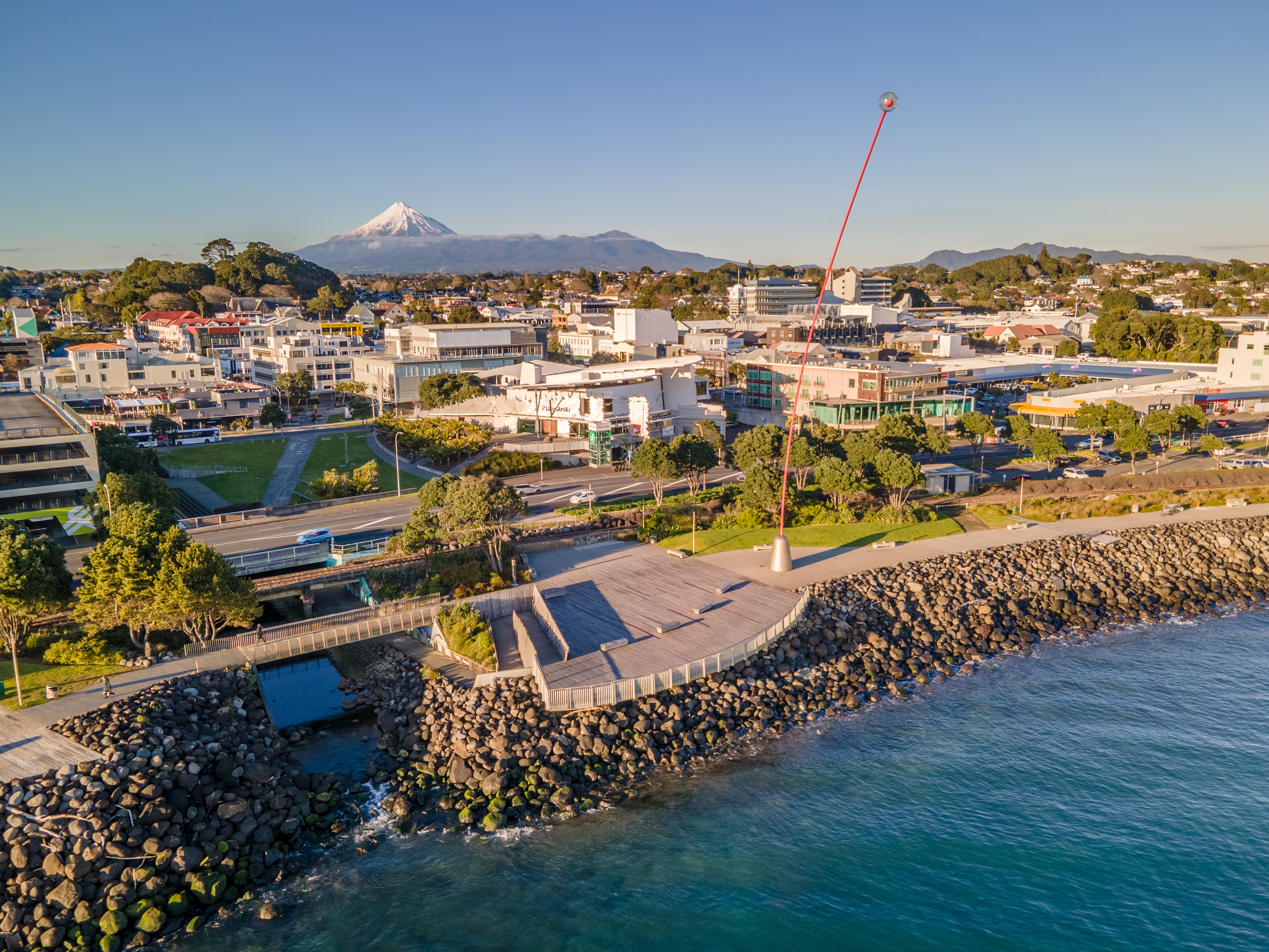
- New Plymouth city skyline looking south from the foreshore with Mount Taranaki on the horizon.

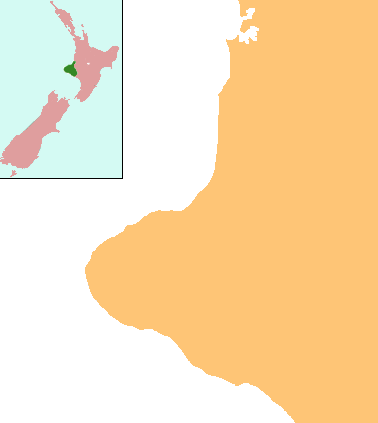
- Location within Taranaki Region Location within North Island Location within New Zealand
- Coordinates: 39°03′28″S 174°04′27″E
- Country: New Zealand
- Region: Taranaki
- District: New Plymouth District
- Settled: 31 March 1841
- NZ Parliament: New Plymouth; Te Tai Hauāuru (Māori)

Government
  - Type: District Council
  - Mayor: Max Brough
  - Deputy Mayor: Murray Chong
  - Territorial authority: New Plymouth District Council
  - MPs: Debbie Ngarewa-Packer (Te Pāti Māori); David MacLeod (National)

Area
  - Territorial: 2,205.6 km^{2} (851.6 sq mi)
  - Urban: 74.79 km^{2} (28.88 sq mi)

Population
  - Territorial: 90,100
  - Density: 40.9/km^{2} (106/sq mi)
  - Urban: 60,200
  - Urban density: 805/km^{2} (2,080/sq mi)
- Time zone: UTC+12 (NZST)
  - Summer (DST): UTC+13 (NZDT)
- Postcode(s): 4310, 4312
- Area code: 06
- Website: newplymouthnz.com

New Plymouth (Māori: Ngāmotu) is the major city of the Taranaki region on the west coast of the North Island of New Zealand. It is named after the English city of Plymouth, in Devon, from where the first English settlers to New Plymouth migrated. The New Plymouth District, which includes New Plymouth City and several smaller towns, is the 10th largest district (out of 67) in New Zealand, and has a population of 90,100 – about two-thirds of the total population of the Taranaki region and 1.7% of New Zealand's population. This includes New Plymouth City (60,200), Waitara (7,720), Inglewood (3,970), Ōakura (1,780), Ōkato (561) and Urenui (429).

The city itself is a service centre for the region's principal economic activities, including intensive pastoral activities (mainly dairy farming) as well as oil, natural gas and petrochemical exploration and production. It is also the region's financial centre as the home of TSB (formerly the Taranaki Savings Bank), the largest of the remaining non-government New Zealand-owned banks.

Notable features are the botanic garden (i.e. Pukekura Park), the critically acclaimed Len Lye Centre and Art Gallery, the 13 km (8.1 mi) New Plymouth Coastal Walkway alongside the Tasman Sea, the Len Lye-designed 45-metre-tall (148 ft) artwork known as the Wind Wand, Paritutu Rock, and views of Mount Taranaki.

New Plymouth was awarded the most liveable city (for a population between 75,000–150,000) by the International Awards for Liveable Communities in 2021. In 2023, New Plymouth was awarded New Zealand's most beautiful small city by Keep New Zealand Beautiful. It also won multiple awards in 2008. The city was in 2010 chosen as one of two walking & cycling "Model Communities" by the government. Based on New Plymouth's already positive attitude towards cyclists and pedestrians, the city received $3.71m to invest into infrastructure and community programmes to boost walking and cycling.

== History ==
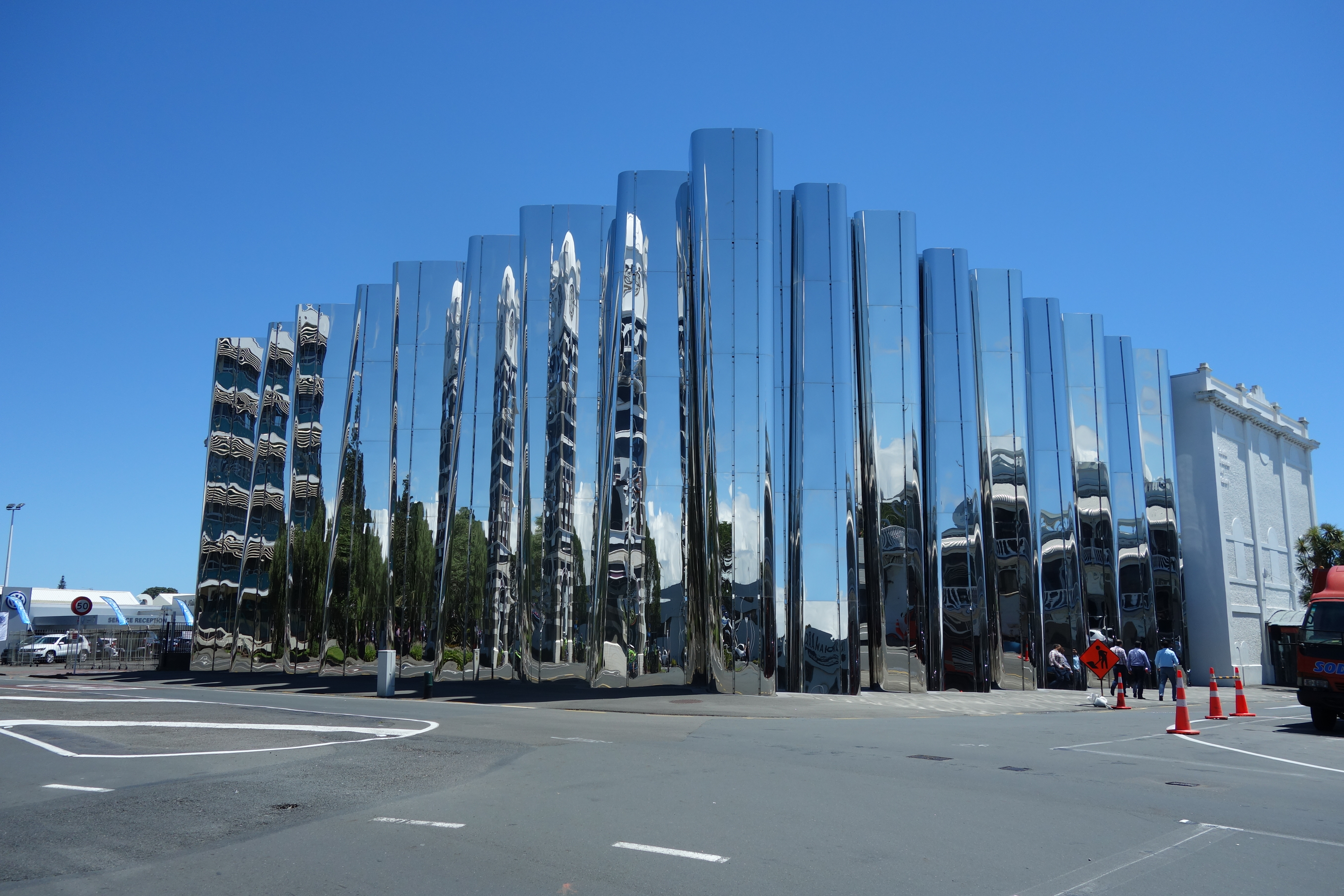
The Govett-Brewster Art Gallery as seen in 2018

The area where New Plymouth was founded had for centuries been the home for several Māori iwi (tribes). From about 1823, the Māori began having contact with European whalers as well as traders who arrived by schooner to buy flax.

In 1828 Richard "Dicky" Barrett (1807–47) set up a trading post at Ngāmotu after arriving on the trading vessel Adventure. Barrett traded with the local Māori and helped negotiate the purchase of land from them on behalf of the New Zealand Company. Settlers were selected by the Plymouth Company, which was set up to attract emigrants from the West Country of England, and which took over land initially purchased by the New Zealand Company. The grid plan for the town's streets was laid out by surveyor Frederic Carrington. The first of the town's settlers arrived on the William Bryan, which anchored off the coast on 31 March 1841. A series of disputes over ownership and settlement of land developed between Māori and settlers soon after and New Plymouth became a fortified garrison town in 1860–1861 as more than 3500 Imperial soldiers, as well as local volunteers and militia, fought Māori in the First Taranaki War.

== Geography ==
=== City suburbs ===
From west to east

- Spotswood
- Whalers Gate
- Moturoa
- Marfell
- Blagdon
- Hurdon
- Lynmouth
- Westown
- Ferndale
- Frankleigh Park
- Vogeltown
- Brooklands
- Welbourn
- Strandon
- Highlands Park
- Merrilands
- Mangorei
- Fitzroy
- Waiwhakaiho
- Glen Avon

=== Satellite settlements ===
- Ōakura
- Omata
- Bell Block
- Inglewood
- Waitara

=== Climate ===
New Plymouth has an oceanic climate that could be described as a moist, temperate climate. The average summer afternoon temperature is 21–22 °C (70–72 °F); the average summer night-time temperature is 12–13 °C (54–55 °F). The city experiences mild winters, where the average afternoon temperature is 13–14 °C (55–57 °F) and night-time temperature is 5–6 °C (41–43 °F). The average annual rainfall is 1,432 mm (56.4 in). On 15 August 2011 it snowed in New Plymouth, a rare event which has been described as a once in a generation occurrence. A New Plymouth site was named the sunniest in the country in 2021, recording 2592 sunshine hours.

Climate data for New Plymouth (1991–2020)
Month	Jan	Feb	Mar	Apr	May	Jun	Jul	Aug	Sep	Oct	Nov	Dec	Year
Record high °C (°F)	30.6 (87.1)	29.5 (85.1)	29.0 (84.2)	24.9 (76.8)	21.7 (71.1)	19.8 (67.6)	18.0 (64.4)	19.9 (67.8)	21.6 (70.9)	22.3 (72.1)	26.4 (79.5)	29.9 (85.8)	30.6 (87.1)
Mean daily maximum °C (°F)	21.8 (71.2)	22.5 (72.5)	21.3 (70.3)	19.0 (66.2)	16.5 (61.7)	14.3 (57.7)	13.5 (56.3)	14.0 (57.2)	15.2 (59.4)	16.3 (61.3)	17.8 (64.0)	20.2 (68.4)	17.7 (63.9)
Daily mean °C (°F)	17.6 (63.7)	18.2 (64.8)	16.8 (62.2)	14.8 (58.6)	12.7 (54.9)	10.7 (51.3)	9.7 (49.5)	10.3 (50.5)	11.6 (52.9)	12.8 (55.0)	14.0 (57.2)	16.3 (61.3)	13.8 (56.8)
Mean daily minimum °C (°F)	13.4 (56.1)	13.8 (56.8)	12.3 (54.1)	10.6 (51.1)	8.9 (48.0)	7.1 (44.8)	5.9 (42.6)	6.5 (43.7)	8.0 (46.4)	9.2 (48.6)	10.1 (50.2)	12.5 (54.5)	9.9 (49.8)
Record low °C (°F)	4.2 (39.6)	2.8 (37.0)	2.6 (36.7)	0.0 (32.0)	−0.8 (30.6)	−2.4 (27.7)	−2.6 (27.3)	−2.3 (27.9)	−2.2 (28.0)	−0.1 (31.8)	1.2 (34.2)	2.1 (35.8)	−2.6 (27.3)
Average rainfall mm (inches)	76.3 (3.00)	89.8 (3.54)	91.1 (3.59)	117.1 (4.61)	149.4 (5.88)	143.6 (5.65)	141.3 (5.56)	128.8 (5.07)	122.9 (4.84)	127.0 (5.00)	103.7 (4.08)	119.3 (4.70)	1,410.3 (55.52)
Average rainy days (≥ 1.0 mm)	8.1	7.8	8.6	10.3	13.6	14.6	14.5	14.8	14.2	12.9	10.9	11.5	141.8
Average relative humidity (%)	81.2	82.5	83.2	82.7	85.7	85.9	86.0	84.8	82.9	83.6	80.0	80.9	83.3
Mean monthly sunshine hours	260.1	235.1	227.0	180.8	149.9	125.5	142.5	170.2	171.0	200.9	225.4	229.7	2,318.1
Mean daily daylight hours	14.6	13.6	12.3	11.0	10.0	9.5	9.7	10.6	11.8	13.1	14.3	14.9	12.1
Percentage possible sunshine	57	61	60	55	48	44	47	52	48	49	53	50	52
Source 1: NIWA Climate Data
Source 2: Météo Climat Weather Spark

== Governance ==
=== New Plymouth Province ===
The New Zealand Constitution Act 1852 created the New Plymouth Province, with a Provincial Council given jurisdiction over an area of 400,000ha. Five years later, the name of the province changed to Taranaki Province. The province was abolished in 1876.

=== Borough/City of New Plymouth ===
New Plymouth City Council Coat-of-Arms as used from 1949

A town board was formed in 1863 and the town was constituted as a borough in August 1876. Its new status did little to overcome some outside perceptions, however. In 1876, author E. W. Payton wrote that "all the great bustling 'cities' of the colony had a patronising way of trying to snub New Plymouth, referring to it in such derogatory terms as the dullest hole in the colony ... nothing whatever to do there... I find a great liking for this 'slow, old hole' ... it is a quiet, unassuming place and has not done so much to attract immigrants and settlers by exaggerating reports, as some districts have done."

Fitzroy Town District was merged with New Plymouth borough in August 1911; Vogeltown, Frankleigh Park and Westown were added a year later, followed by St Aubyn-Moturoa. By 1913, the town had a population of 7,538. Seafront land was added in 1931 and 1941; land acquired on Omata Rd was added in 1955 and in 1960, large areas including land to the south of Paritutu, as well as Hurdon, Ferndale and Huatoki were included, as well as land straddling Mangorei Rd between Te Hēnui Stream and Waiwakaiho River.

New Plymouth was declared a city in 1949.

=== New Plymouth District Council ===
In 1989, as a part of the New Zealand-wide reorganisation of local government, New Plymouth City Council was merged with Taranaki District Council (Taranaki County Council and Waitara Borough merged in 1986), Inglewood District Council (Inglewood Borough and County merged in 1986), and Clifton County Council to form New Plymouth District Council.

Every three years, the mayor, 14 councillors and 16 community board members are elected by the New Plymouth District's enrolled voters. The full council, sub-committees and standing committees meet on a six-weekly cycle.

The Policy and Monitoring standing committees have delegated authority from the council to make final decisions on certain matters, and they make recommendations to the council on all others. The four community boards–Clifton, Waitara, Inglewood and Kaitake–as well as the subcommittees and working parties can make recommendations to the standing committees for them to consider.

The third standing committee, the Hearings Commission, is a quasi-judicial body that meets whenever a formal hearing is required–for instance, to hear submissions on a publicly notified resource consent application.

The Chief Executive and approximately 460 full-time equivalent staff provide advice and information to the elected members and the public, implement council decisions and manage the district's day-to-day operations.

This includes everything from maintaining more than 280 parks and reserves, waste water management and issuing consents and permits, through to providing libraries and other recreational services and ensuring the district's eateries meet health standards.

New Plymouth District Council's annual operating revenue for 2008/2009 is more than $188 million.

The current mayor of New Plymouth is Max Brough.

== Demographics ==
Stats NZ describes New Plymouth as a large urban area, which includes Bell Block and covers 74.79 km^{2} (28.88 sq mi). It had an estimated population of 60,200 as of June 2025, with a population density of 805 people per km^{2}.

Historical population
Year	Pop.	±% p.a.
2006	49,395	—
2013	50,157	+0.22%
2018	54,279	+1.59%
2023	58,047	+1.35%
The 2006 population is for a larger area of 111.33 km^{2}, which includes Ōakura and Paraite. Source:

New Plymouth had a population of 58,047 in the 2023 New Zealand census, an increase of 3,768 people (6.9%) since the 2018 census, and an increase of 7,890 people (15.7%) since the 2013 census. There were 28,056 males, 29,781 females, and 213 people of other genders in 22,779 dwellings. 2.8% of people identified as LGBTIQ+. The median age was 40.9 years (compared with 38.1 years nationally). There were 11,037 people (19.0%) aged under 15 years, 9,561 (16.5%) aged 15 to 29, 25,419 (43.8%) aged 30 to 64, and 12,030 (20.7%) aged 65 or older.

People could identify as more than one ethnicity. The results were 82.5% European (Pākehā); 18.4% Māori; 2.7% Pasifika; 8.8% Asian; 1.1% Middle Eastern, Latin American and African New Zealanders (MELAA); and 2.5% other, which includes people giving their ethnicity as "New Zealander". English was spoken by 97.2%, Māori by 3.6%, Samoan by 0.4%, and other languages by 9.3%. No language could be spoken by 2.0% (e.g. too young to talk). New Zealand Sign Language was known by 0.4%. The percentage of people born overseas was 19.5, compared with 28.8% nationally.

Religious affiliations were 33.0% Christian, 1.5% Hindu, 0.8% Islam, 0.6% Māori religious beliefs, 0.6% Buddhist, 0.5% New Age, 0.1% Jewish, and 1.4% other religions. People who answered that they had no religion were 53.9%, and 7.8% of people did not answer the census question.

Of those at least 15 years old, 10,269 (21.8%) people had a bachelor's or higher degree, 25,716 (54.7%) had a post-high school certificate or diploma, and 11,028 (23.5%) people exclusively held high school qualifications. The median income was $39,200, compared with $41,500 nationally. 5,310 people (11.3%) earned over $100,000 compared to 12.1% nationally. The employment status of those at least 15 was 22,410 (47.7%) full-time, 6,873 (14.6%) part-time, and 1,176 (2.5%) unemployed.

== Industry and utilities ==
Electric power was first provided in January 1906 from the Mangorei power station alongside the Waiwhakaiho River near Burgess Park. In the 1960s, the New Plymouth Power Station was initially designed to run on coal but constructed to be fuelled by natural gas or fuel oil. This is a thermal power station with a steam turbine, commenced operation in 1974 with units progressively decommissioned from 2000 with one left operating in 2008.

Companies began searching for oil on the New Plymouth coast in 1865 after small deposits of thick oil were found on the shoreline. The first commercial quantities of oil were obtained in January 1866. Exploration continued sporadically, and a refinery opened in 1913. Production ceased about 1972. The city was one of the original nine towns and cities in New Zealand to be supplied with natural gas when the Kapuni gas field in South Taranaki entered production in 1970. The offshore Maui A well began production of natural gas in the late 1970s, sparking a flourishing energy and petrochemical industry. As Maui A's resources decline, new sites in Taranaki are being developed in an effort to find more commercial petrochemical reserves.

Powerco operates the local electricity and natural gas distribution networks in the city. Electricity is supplied from Transpower's national grid at two substations: Carrington Street (Brooklands) and Huirangi. Natural gas is supplied from First Gas's transmission system at a gate station in Bell Block.

Among the city's major industrial companies was Ivon Watkins-Dow, an agricultural chemicals company founded in 1944 by brothers Ivon, Harry and Dan Watkins and joined as a partner 20 years later by Dow Chemicals of Michigan. The company ran a factory at Paritutu making the herbicide 2,4,5-T. A 2005 study found that people who lived close to the Ivon Watkins-Dow plant between 1962 and 1987 were likely to have dioxin levels on average four times higher than the general public. In some groups, the level was as much as seven times as high. A Public Health Medicine senior adviser has claimed that based on international findings, the residents' exposure to dioxin may cause increased rates of disease, in particular cancer. In March 2007, the Ministry of Health announced it would offer a major health support programme to anyone affected. In April 2008, the Ministry clarified that the programme's main feature would be a free annual medical check up for those who had lived, worked or studied close to the factory.

== Features and attractions ==
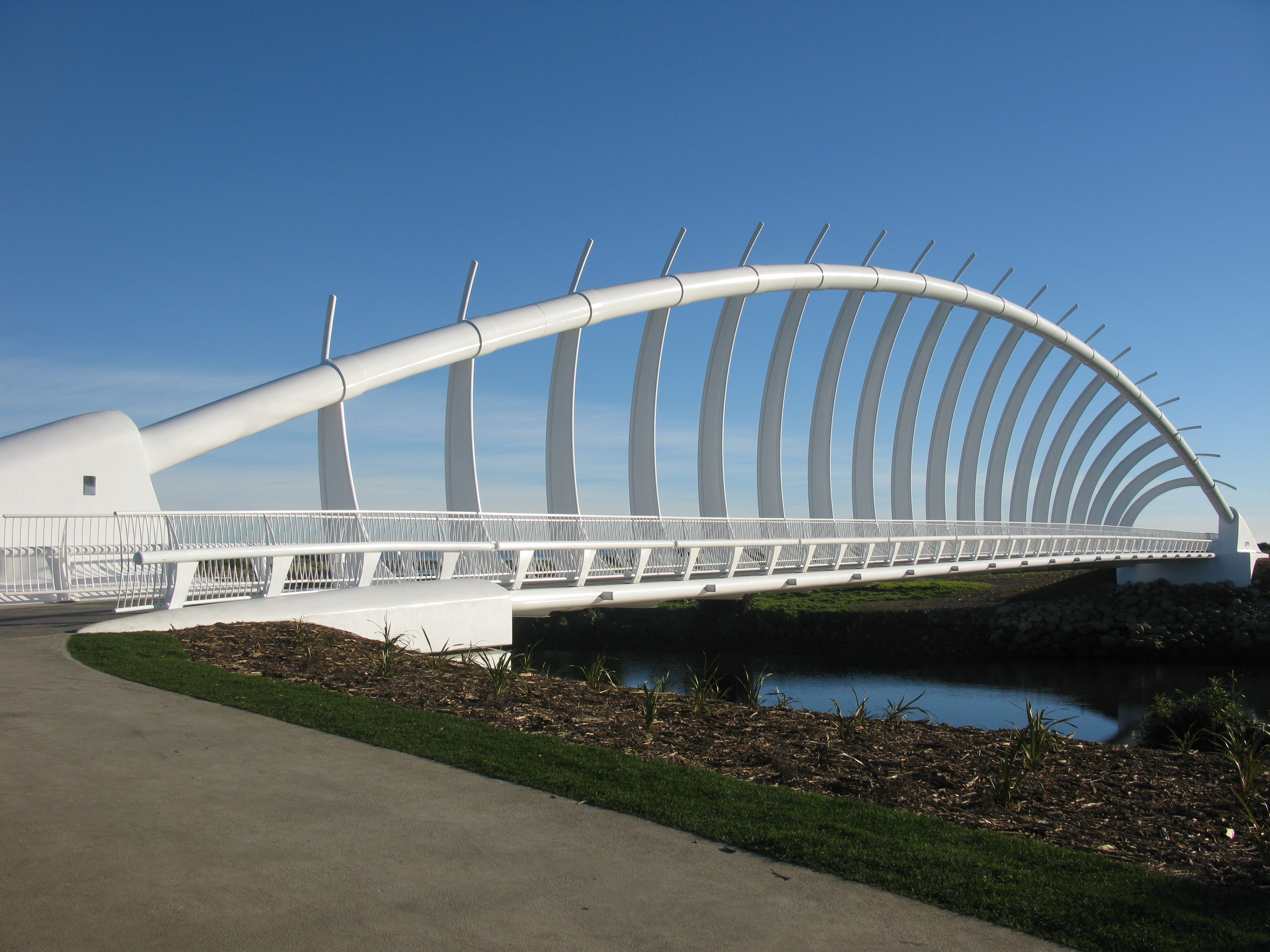
Te Rewa Rewa Bridge which immediately became a symbol of the extensive cycling opportunities that have been created in and around New Plymouth.

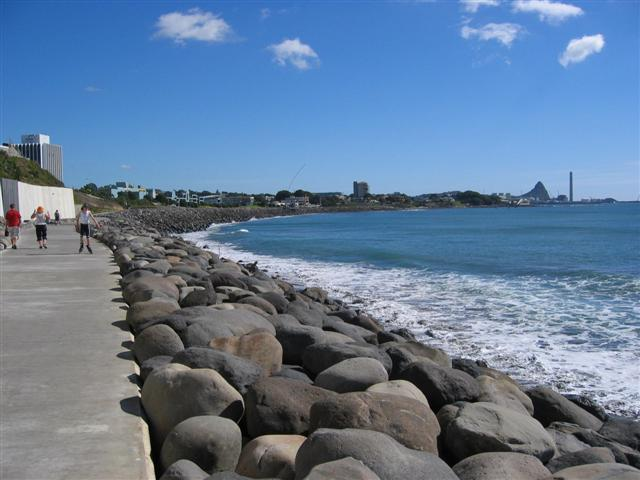
Coastal Walkway in New Plymouth

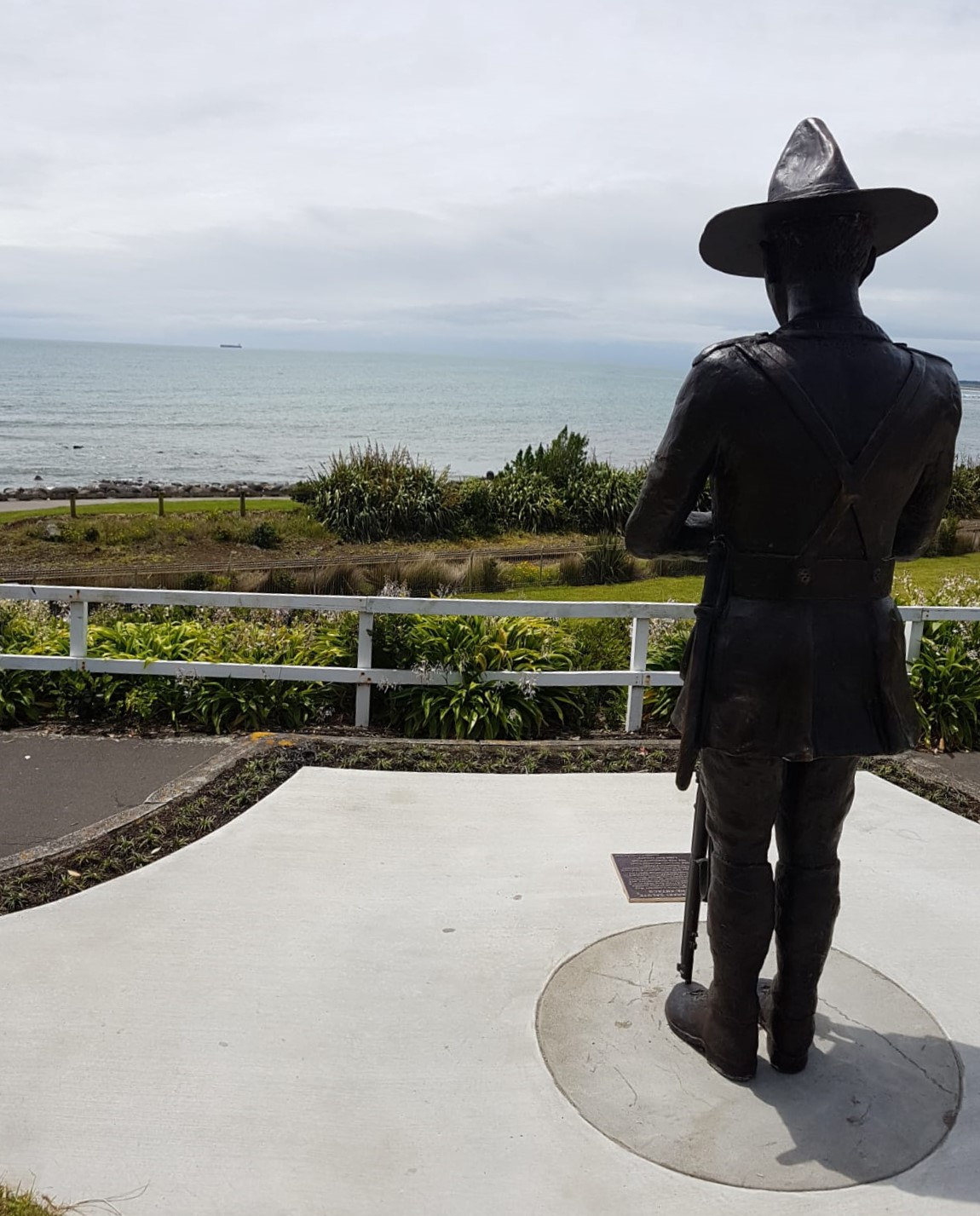
The Taranaki Salute to the Anzacs – statue in New Plymouth

New Plymouth District has a reputation as an events centre, with major festivals (the annual TSB Festival of Lights, Taranaki Powerco Garden Spectacular, WOMAD and the biennial Taranaki Arts Festival), sports fixtures (including international rugby, surfing, cricket and tennis matches, and the annual ITU World Cup Triathlon) and concerts (from Sir Elton John, Jack Johnson, REM, John Farnham and Fleetwood Mac).

With its rich volcanic soil, the city is well known for its gardens. Chief among them are the 52 ha Pukekura Park in the centre of the city (named a Garden of National Significance), and Pukeiti, a rhododendron garden of international significance high on the Pouākai Range.

Pukekura Park is also the home of the TSB Festival of Lights, which runs for free every year from mid-December to early February. It has daytime and night-time programmes of events for people of all ages, and the festival itself transforms the park into an illuminated wonderland every evening.

Next to the foreshore in the central city is Puke Ariki – the world's first purpose-built, fully integrated museum, library and information centre.

Nearby is the Govett-Brewster Art Gallery, a contemporary art museum. It includes the Len Lye Centre, a purpose-built extension to the museum that houses the collection of filmmaker and kinetic artist Len Lye, which opened in 2015.

The Coastal Walkway is a 13 km path that forms an expansive sea-edge promenade stretching almost the entire length of the city, from the Bell Block mouth in the east to Port Taranaki in the west. The pathway includes the iconic Te Rewa Rewa Bridge and is ideal for walking, running, cycling or skating, or simply enjoying the view of the dramatic west coast. It has won numerous awards, including the Cycle Friendly Award in 2008 for the best New Zealand cycle facility.

Centre City Shopping Centre is the only shopping mall in New Plymouth. It contains over 50 shops and services.

== Awards ==
New Plymouth won the award for the most liveable city (for a population between 75,000–150,000) by the International Awards for Liveable Communities in 2021.

New Plymouth won the Top Town award from North and South Magazine in 2008 (judged "the best place in New Zealand to live, love, work and raise a family").

The city also won three awards at the 11th International Awards for Liveable Communities held in Dongguan, China, 6–10 November 2008:

- Whole City Gold award (population category 20,000 – 75,000)
- Criteria award for Community Sustainability
- Gold award for community project (natural) – the Coastal Walkway.

== Transport ==
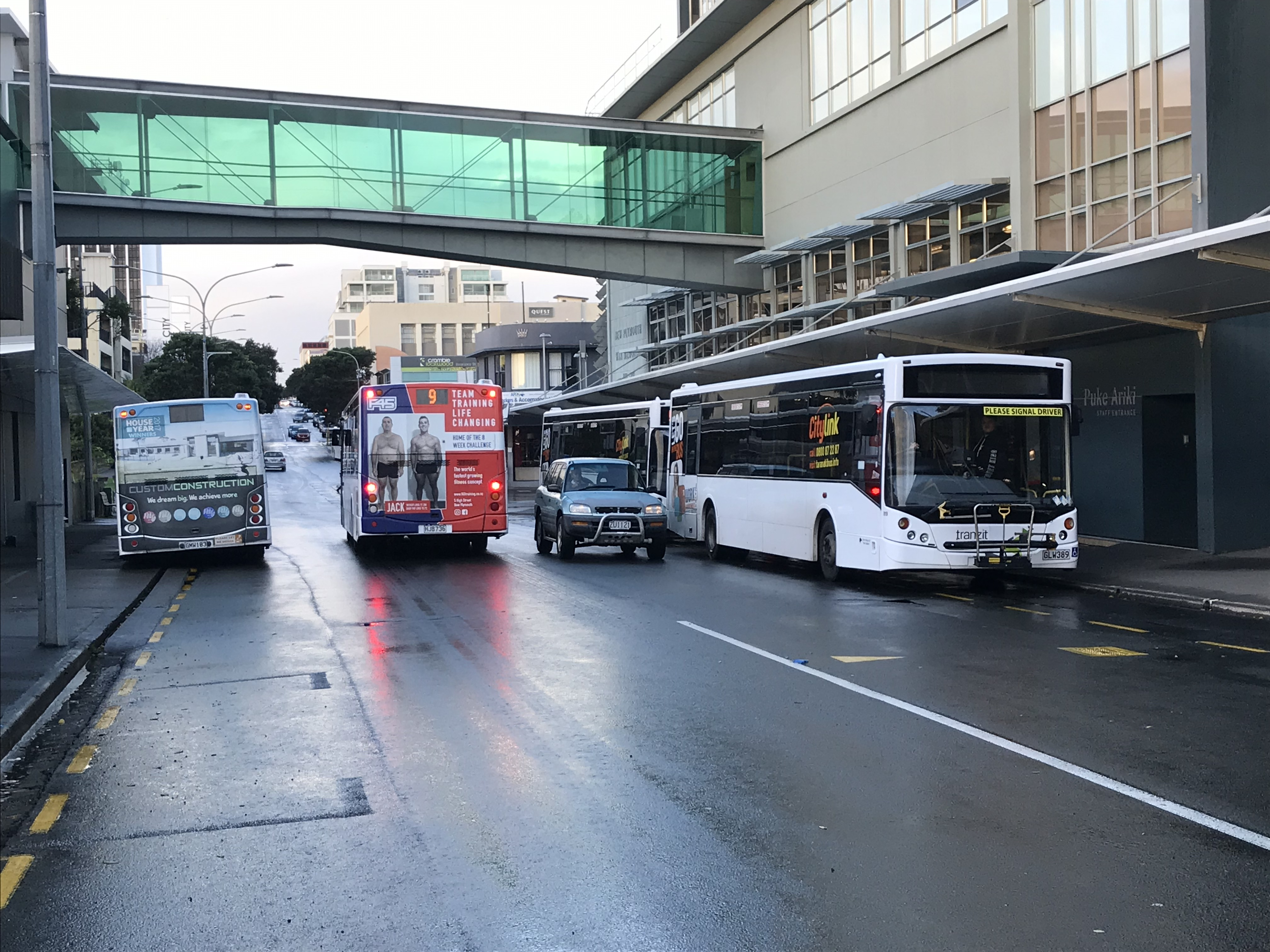
The New Plymouth Bus Centre

=== Rail ===
An 18 km (11 mi) railway link between New Plymouth railway station and Waitara was completed in 1875; this later became the Waitara Branch. The next year, work began on a line south to Stratford, which was reached in 1879, followed by Hāwera in 1881. This line, known as the Marton–New Plymouth Line, was completed on 23 March 1885. With the opening of the Wellington–Manawatu Line on 3 November 1886, a direct rail link to Wellington was established.

Passenger services included the New Plymouth Express (1886–1977), the Taranaki Flyer (1926–1959), the New Plymouth Night Express to Auckland (1933–1971) and its successor to Taumaranui (1971-1983). From 1956 most services were provided by Standard and 88-seater railcars. By 1983 all regular passenger trains had been withdrawn; since then, only occasional excursions by preservation societies have visited New Plymouth.

=== Port ===
The breakwater at Ngāmotu was completed in 1883, providing safe berthage for vessels, and the Moturoa wharf was completed in 1888. Today Port Taranaki is the region’s principal maritime facility and the only deep-water port on the west coast of New Zealand.

=== Public transport ===
Electric trams began operating in 1916, with bus services beginning three years later. Trams were withdrawn in 1954, and while a small trolleybus service operated from 1950 until 1967, the city was otherwise served by New Plymouth City Transport buses until deregulation in 1991. Today bus services operate under contract to the Taranaki Regional Council as part of the Citylink network.

=== Air ===
The first aircraft landed at New Plymouth’s racecourse in 1920. Commercial flights began from Bell Block aerodrome in June 1937, which was requisitioned as an RNZAF station during World War II. The facility was replaced in 1966 by the present New Plymouth Airport, 3 km (1.9 mi) north-east of the old site, with a sealed runway capable of handling larger aircraft.

=== Bike lane ===
In July 2025, the New Zealand Transport Agency installed a bike lane known as "Tim Tams" along Devon Street West between Morley Street and Belair Avenue at a cost of NZ$3.8 million. The bike lane drew criticism from motorists whose tyres were damaged by concrete separators, local residents who criticised the difficulty in accessing their driveways and businesses who criticised the loss of parking spaces. While some cyclists welcomed the security the bike lane provided, others took issue with its narrow space and accidents from touching the separators. New Plymouth businessman Shane Devlin organised a petition against Tim Tams which drew 7,500 signatures. During the 2025 New Zealand local elections, Mayor of New Plymouth Max Brough campaigned on removing the Tim Tams cycleway. The New Plymouth District Council estimated it would cost $300,000 to replace the concrete barriers with painted lines but also warned that costs could rise to $1.6 million if the road surface was damaged in the process. On 19 November, the New Plymouth District Council voted by a margin of 10 to 5 votes to remove the cycle lane's concrete separators during the Christmas holidays.

== Emergency services ==
New Plymouth has two fire stations in the city, with the central station a block away from the CBD. The station houses four fire appliances, including an aerial appliance, along with three specialist vehicles. New Plymouth Central Fire Station is staffed by two crews (8 firefighters) 24 hours a day, 7 days a week and responds, not only to the city, but to surrounding areas if needed. New Plymouth West Volunteer Fire Brigade is based west of the city in the suburb of Spotswood. The volunteer station houses a single appliance, but is close to Port Taranaki and LPG/Gas tanks. The brigade supports New Plymouth and surrounding satellite towns.

Police stations are scattered throughout the city, with the main base at a modern police station on Powderham Street. Other suburban stations are located in Fitzroy, Westown and Bell Block.

Hato Hone St John supplies all ambulance services to Taranaki, with their main station based in Waiwhakaiho.

The Taranaki Rescue Helicopter Trust provides search, rescue and patient transfer missions when required. The MBB/Kawasaki BK 117 is based at its hangar at Taranaki Base Hospital.

Port Taranaki is the home port for HMNZS Endeavour, although the ship is based at the Devonport Naval Base on Auckland's North Shore.

== Education ==
There are schools in Fitzroy, Frankleigh Park, Hurdon, Lynmouth, Mangorei, Marfell, Merrilands, Moturoa, Spotswood, Strandon, Vogeltown, Welbourn, Westown and Brooklands. The Western Institute of Technology at Taranaki has its main campus in Welbourn.

New Plymouth Boys' High School and New Plymouth Girls' High School are single-sex secondary (years 9–13) schools with rolls of 1,484 and 1,301 respectively. The Boys' High School was founded in 1882, and the Girls' High School separated from it in 1914.

Francis Douglas Memorial College and Sacred Heart Girls' College, state-integrated catholic boys and girls schools (Years 7–13) respectively, while Spotswood College in the western suburbs is the only co-educational secondary school in the city.

== Media ==
Local print media include:

- Taranaki Daily News – established in 1857
- Taranaki Midweek
- South Taranaki Star
- Stratford Press

Local radio stations:

- More FM 93.2FM – local breakfast (formerly Energy FM)
- The Hits 90FM – local day show (formerly Radio Taranaki)
- Access Radio Taranaki 104.4FM – local community programming
- The Most FM 100.4FM – local programming
- Cruize FM – online streaming only
- Newstalk ZB – local Saturday morning sports show and local break-outs when required for sport and updates

Other stations run by NZME and Mediaworks are broadcast throughout Taranaki but are networked from either Auckland or Wellington.

Local television stations:

- 7 Taranaki – closed down in 2007

The main television and FM radio transmitter for New Plymouth is located near Tahurangi Lodge on the eastern slopes of Mount Taranaki, 25 km (16 mi) south of the city. The first transmitter at the site was commissioned in 1966, relaying Wellington's WNTV1 channel (now part of TVNZ 1). Today, digital terrestrial television (Freeview) is available in the city from the Mount Taranaki transmitter.

== Notable people ==
=== Academia ===
- Zena Daysh (1914–2011), influential in the human ecology movement, founder of the Commonwealth Human Ecology Council
- David Gauld (1942–present), president of the New Zealand Mathematical Society 1981–82
- Leila Hurle (1901–1989), schoolteacher, schools inspector
- Michael Kelly (1949–present), Prince Philip Professor of Technology, University of Cambridge
- David Penny (1939–present), third New Zealander to be named a National Academy of Sciences foreign associate
- Harry Skinner (1886–1978), soldier, ethnologist, university lecturer, museum curator and director, librarian; the H.D. Skinner Annex of the Otago Museum, was opened in August 2013, and named in honour of Skinner
- William Skinner (1857–1946), surveyor, historian, and ethnographer; founder of Puke Ariki, co-founder of the Polynesian Society
- Beatrice Tinsley (1941–1981), astronomer and cosmologist
- Neil Waters (1931–2018), inorganic chemist, academic administrator, served as vice-chancellor of Massey University (1983–1995)

=== Arts ===
==== Cartoon ====
- Maurice Bramley (1898–1975), cartoonist and commercial artist
- Keith Waite (1927–2014), editorial cartoonist, referred to as one of the 'greatest-ever social and political cartoonists' in Britain

==== Film ====
- Melanie Lynskey (1977–present), actress
- Anthony McCarten (1961–present), author, playwright and screenwriter
- John O'Shea (1920–2001), director, producer, writer and actor, produced the only three feature films that were made in New Zealand between 1940 and 1970
- Jared Turner (1978–present), actor

==== Music ====
- Hayden Chisholm (1975–present), saxophonist and multi-instrumentalist
- Graeme Jefferies, musician
- Peter Jefferies, musician
- Midge Marsden (1945–present), blues and R&B guitarist, harmonica-player, and singer
- Wayne Mason (1949–present), musician
- Desna Sisarich (1946–present), pop singer, one of New Zealand's first woman singer/songwriters
- Matt Thomas (1973–present), musician
- Stan Walker (1990–present), Australian Idol winner

==== Photography ====
- Trent Keegan (1974–2008), photojournalist

==== Performing arts ====
- Stuart Hoar (1957–present), playwright, teacher, novelist, radio dramatist and librettist
- Brian McNeill (born 1939), playwright, actor, and director

==== Visual arts ====
- Fanny Arden (c. 1859–1955), painter
- Barry Brickell (1935–2016), potter, writer, conservationist and founder of Driving Creek Railway
- Dale Copeland (1943–present), collage and assemblage artist
- Joan Dukes (1903–1993), artist and illustrator
- Christine Hellyar (1947–present), artist who makes sculptures and installations
- Michael Smither (1939–present), painter and composer, set the record for the most expensive painting sold that was painted by a living New Zealand artist
- Francis Upritchard (1976–present), contemporary artist based in London, she represented New Zealand at the Venice Biennale

==== Writing ====
- Helen Brown (1945–present), author and columnist
- John Guthrie (1905–1955), journalist and novelist
- Michele Leggott (1956–present), poet, academic
- Ian Middleton (1927–2007), novelist

=== Broadcasting ===
- Daisy Basham (1879–1963), radio personality
- Mark Crysell (1961–present), former TVNZ Europe correspondent and current Sunday reporter
- Patrick Gower (1976/1977–present), journalist and National Correspondent for Newshub
- Jim Hickey (1949–present), weather presenter
- Derryn Hinch (1944–2026), Australian media personality, politician, actor, journalist and author, best known for his work on Melbourne radio and television. He served as a Senator for Victoria from 2016 to 2019.
- Marama Martin (1930–2017), television and radio broadcaster. She was the first person seen on colour television in New Zealand, and was the last person to appear on NZBC TV
- Denzil Meuli (1926–2019), writer, former newspaper editor, Roman Catholic priest of the Diocese of Auckland and a leading traditionalist Catholic in New Zealand
- John McBeth (1944–present), author and journalist
- Toni Street (1983–present), television presenter and sports commentator

=== Business ===
- Tim Besley (1927–present), engineer, businessman and former senior public servant
- Trish Gregory, fashion designer and businesswoman
- Newton King (1855–1927), auctioneer, merchant and businessman. One of the founders of the Crown Dairy Company. By 1897, it was New Zealand's second-largest dairy product company.

=== Charity ===
- Sir Frederic Truby King (1858–1938), founder of the Plunket Society

=== Defence ===
- Evelyn Brooke (1879–1962), civilian and military nurse, served during the First World War and was the only New Zealand nurse to receive the Royal Red Cross and Bar
- Tony Parr (1955–present), former Chief of the Royal New Zealand Navy Rear Admiral
- Bert Wipiti (1922–1943), fighter pilot and flying ace of the Second World War, first Māori airman to leave New Zealand for active duty

=== Horticulture ===
- William Douglas Cook (1884–1967), founder of Eastwoodhill Arboretum, now the national arboretum of New Zealand; one of the founders of Pukeiti, a rhododendron garden

=== Law ===
- Peter Quilliam (1920–2004), Chief Justice of the Cook Islands, judge of the High Court of New Zealand
- John Edwards, UK Information Commissioner

=== Politics ===
==== Activism ====
- Ruth Atkinson (1861–1927), president of the Woman's Christian Temperance Union (1910–1927), activist involved in the Temperance movement and women's rights movement
- Dame Stella Casey (1924–2000), campaigner for social issues
- Te Huirangi Waikerepuru (1929–2020), Māori language activist and trade unionist, was active in the foundation and governance of Māori language radio and television

==== Local government ====
- Harry Barker (1898–1994), Mayor of Gisborne for 27 years (1950–1977)

==== New Zealand Parliament ====
- Arthur Atkinson (1863–1935), MP for City of Wellington (1899–1902), Wellington City Councillor (1909–1921)
- Bruce Beetham (1936–1997), leader of the Social Credit Political League, Mayor of Hamilton (1976 -1977), MP for Rangitīkei (1978–1981)
- Cam Calder (1952–present), MP (2009–2014), president of the French New Zealand Business Council
- Ken Comber (1939–1998), MP for Wellington Central (1972–1981)
- Frederic Carrington (1807–1901), politician and surveyor. He is regarded as the Father of New Plymouth
- Liz Craig (1967–present), MP (2017–2023)
- Harry Duynhoven (1955–present), Mayor of New Plymouth (2010–2013), MP for New Plymouth (1987–1990), New Plymouth councillor (2015–2025)
- Ida Gaskin (1919–2016), Labour Party candidate for New Plymouth, Mastermind winner
- Roy Jack (1914–1977), Speaker of the House of Representatives (1967–1972); Minister of Justice (1972); MP for Patea (1954–1963), Waimarino (1963–1972), Rangitīkei (1972–1977)
- Steven Joyce (1963–present), founder of MediaWorks New Zealand, Member of Parliament (2008–2018), Cabinet Minister (2008–2017)
- Andrew Little (1965–present), leader of the Labour Party (2014–2017), Member of Parliament (2011–2023), Cabinet Minister (2017–2023), Mayor of Wellington (2025–present),
- Gervan McMillan (1904–1951), MP for Dunedin West (1935–1943), Dunedin City Councillor (1935 – 1941, 1944 – 1947, 1950 – 1951)
- Debbie Ngarewa-Packer (1966/1967–present), MP (2020–present), co-leader of the Te Pāti Māori
- Maryan Street (1955–present), 29th president of the Labour Party (1993–1995), Minister of ACC (2007–2008), Minister of Housing (2007–2008), MP (2005–2014), first openly gay female Member of Parliament
- Merv Wellington (1940–2003), MP for Manurewa (1975–1978) and Papakura (1978–1990)

==== Party politics ====
- Claude Weston (1879–1946), effectively the first president of the National Party (1936–1940)

=== Religion ===
- Emma Jane Richmond (1845–1921), community and religious worker, pioneer of anthroposophy in New Zealand

=== Sports ===
==== Athletics ====
- Michael Aish (1976–present), athlete

==== Cricket ====
- Gary Robertson, NZ Fast Bowler
- Stephen Robertson, NZ Cricketer
- Will Young (1992–present), Black Caps batsman

==== Rugby ====
- Lachlan Boshier (1994–present), rugby union player
- Beauden Barrett (1991–present), rugby union player
- Jordie Barrett (1997–present), rugby union player
- Kane Barrett (1990–present), rugby union player
- Scott Barrett (1993–present), rugby union player
- Michaela Blyde (1995–present), rugby sevens player
- Shane Cleaver (1987–present), rugby union player
- Kendra Cocksedge (1988–present), rugby union player and cricketer
- Liam Coltman (1990–present), rugby union player
- Grant Fox (1962–present), rugby union player
- Scott Fuglistaller (1987–present), rugby union player
- Du'Plessis Kirifi (1997–present), rugby union player
- Deacon Manu (1979–present), rugby union player
- John Mitchell (1964–present), rugby union coach and former player
- Terry O'Sullivan (1936-1997), All Black 1960-1962
- Leon Power (1986–present), rugby union player
- Ricky Riccitelli (1995–present), rugby union player
- Conrad Smith (1981–present), rugby union coach and former player
- Willie Talau (1976–present), rugby league footballer
- Paul Tito (1978–present), rugby union player
- Roger Urbahn (1934–1984), rugby union player
- Teihorangi Walden (1993–present), rugby union player
- Paul Williams (1985–present), rugby union referee

==== Soccer ====
- Frank van Hattum (1958–present), international football player
- Frank Albrechtsen (1932–2021), international football player

==== Surfing ====
- Paige Hareb (1990–present), professional surfer

=== Other ===
- Charles Armitage Brown (1787–1842), close friend of the poet John Keats, as well as being a friend of artist Joseph Severn, Leigh Hunt, Thomas Jefferson Hogg, Walter Savage Landor and Edward John Trelawny. He was the father of Charles Brown, a pioneer and politician of New Plymouth.

== Sister cities ==
- Kunming, Yunnan, China
- Mishima, Shizuoka, Japan

== See also ==
- Mayor of New Plymouth
