= New Plymouth Boys' High School =

- Te Kura Tamātane o Ngāmotu

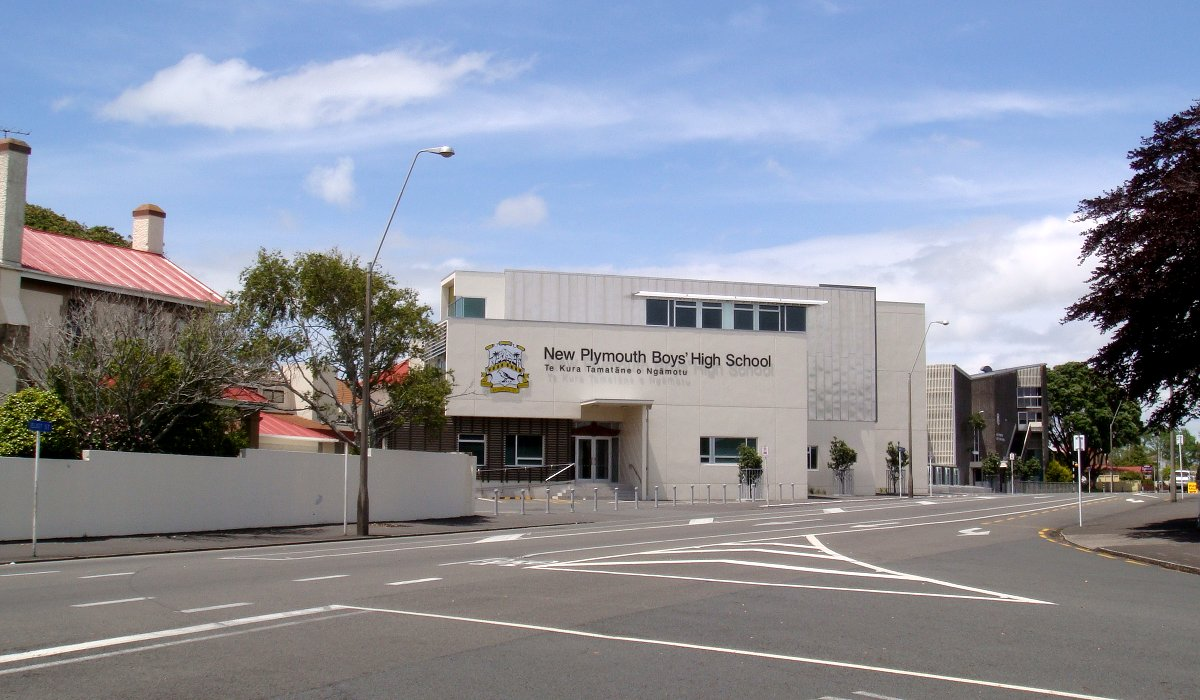
- View of New Plymouth Boys High School

Location
- Coronation Avenue; New Plymouth; New Zealand; 39.0613°S 174.0866°E

Information
- Type: State single sex boys' secondary (Year 9–13) with boarding facilities
- Motto: Et comitate, Et virtute, Et Sapientia "Comradeship, Valour and Wisdom"
- Established: 1882; 144 years ago
- Ministry of Education Institution no.: 171
- Headmaster: Sam Moore
- Enrolment: 1,484 (July 2026)
- Socio-economic decile: 7O
- Website: www.npbhs.school.nz

New Plymouth Boys' High School is a single-sex boys' state secondary school in New Plymouth, Taranaki, New Zealand.

The school currently caters for approximately 1600 students, including 190 odd boarders, on its 15 hectares (37 acres) site.

== History ==
New Plymouth High School was established in 1878 by an Act of Parliament and was officially opened in 1882. The school was established on reserve land that had been set aside for educational purposes. The first headmaster was Ernest Pridham, who ran the school until his retirement in 1911.

The school only admitted boys until 1885, when girls were accepted for the first time. It remained coeducational until 1914, when New Plymouth Girls' High School was established in Strandon. From this date, the school became New Plymouth Boys' High School.

The school celebrated its 125th Jubilee in 2007.

Thomas Shailer Weston was for some time a governor of the school.

== Pridham Hall ==
Pridham Hall, named after the first headmaster Ernest Pridham, a Master of the Arts graduate from Dublin, is one of the heritage buildings from New Plymouth, registered by Heritage New Zealand as a Category 1 Historic Place.

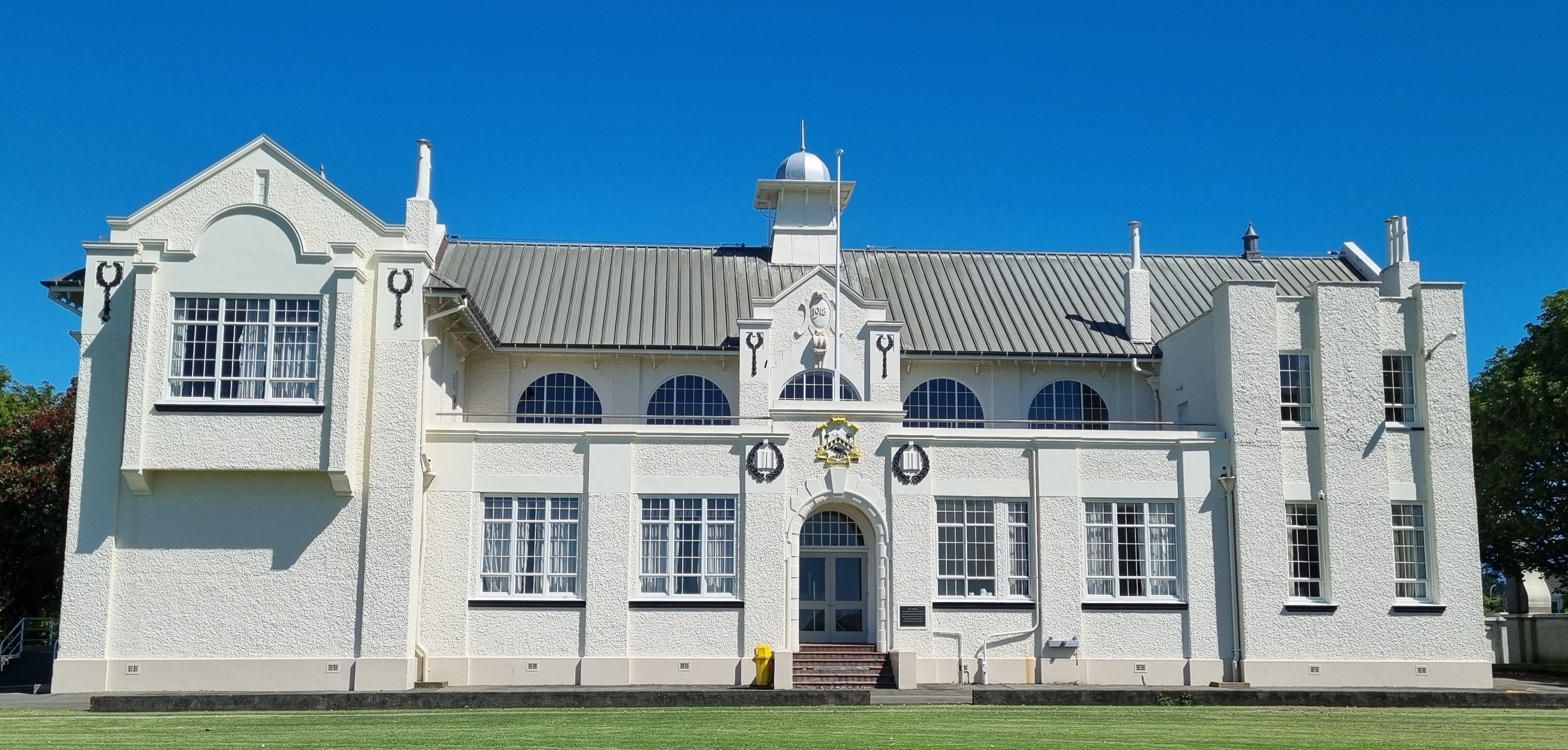
Pridham Hall

Designed by the New Zealand architect William Cumming, Pridham Hall was built between 1918 and 1919 by Boon Bros of New Plymouth and it was for a very long time the main building of the school. It features a large roof lantern on the north façade, a large Elizabethan style window at the west wing of the building, and a large balcony on the front façade towards the cricket ground. Pridham Hall has several classrooms and laboratories built around it. The building suffered from a serious fire in 1925, that destroyed the classrooms in the South-Eastern corner, affecting also the roof of the assembly hall. The damage was repaired again by the Boon Bros later that year.

== Principals ==
- Ernest Pridham (1882–1911)
- Bill Moyes (1912–1941)
- Jack McNaught (1942–1957)
- John Webster (1958–1967)––
- Wit Alexander (1968–1971)
- Geoff Cramond (1972–1978)
- Tom Ryder (1979–1995)
- Lyal French-Wright (1995–2008)
- Michael McMenamin (2008–2015)
- Paul Verić (2015–2019)
- Sam Moore (2019–present)

== Houses ==
New Plymouth Boys' High School currently has four houses. Students are sorted alphabetically into their houses, with the exception of Hatherly, which consists of boarders only.

- Barak – Green – named after Dr Monty Barak who attended school from 1916 - 1920 and was awarded a Rhodes Scholarship in 1926 to study at The University of Oxford
- Donnelly – Blue – Named after Martin Donnelly who attended school from 1930 - 1936. Martin Donnelly was a New Zealand test cricketer as well as an English rugby union player.
- Hatherly – Red – Named after John Hatherly who attended school from 1928 - 1933. He returned to school as a teaching master from 1940 - 1978. During that time he was a boarding master for all but two years from 1940 - 1976.
- Syme – Yellow – Named after Sir Ronald Syme was at school from 1918 - 1920. Sir Ronald was associated with Oxford University where he is widely regarded as the 20th century’s greatest historian on ancient Rome.

== Facilities ==
In 2008, the school acquired a new wing (now known as the French-Wright Block, named for the former headmaster Lyal French-Wright) with facilities for administration, science and mathematics. The wing was opened by the prime minister at the time, Helen Clark.

The school has a boarding hostel, providing accommodation for up to 200 students.

== United Space School ==
New Plymouth Boys' High School and New Plymouth Girls' High School are the only New Zealand schools to take part in the Foundation for International Space Education's United Space School which is held in Houston, Texas each year. One student from each school (and in 2009 a teacher), is selected to attend.

== Exchange programme ==
A student exchange program has been established with a Chilean High School, Colegio San Nicolás de Myra, so that every year students alternate exchanges between New Plymouth and Santiago. In 2006, NPBHS travelled to Chile for the first time, and the next year students from Chile came to NPBHS in return. This exchange has continued into the present, and is run through NPBHS by Tineka Twigley. The school also associates with schools in New Plymouth's sister cities in China and Japan.

== Controversy over bullying ==
After an incident in 2008 when a boarder was attacked by four other students the school's board of trustees commissioned an independent report on bullying in November 2008. The report, released in late January 2009, identified a culture of bullying amongst students in the school's hostel, although the school's board of trustees disputed some of the report's findings. A 2010 Education Review Office review of the school did not highlight any bullying issues, and gave the school a positive report.

== Notable alumni ==
Idol winner Stan Walker, musicians Matt Thomas, Hayden Chisholm, former Chief of the Royal New Zealand Navy Rear Admiral Tony Parr, David Gauld (president of the New Zealand Mathematical Society 1981–82), the author and journalist John McBeth, and 24 All Blacks graduated from New Plymouth Boys' High School.

In 2018, Professor Emeritus David Penny was named a foreign associate of the National Academy of Sciences (NAS).

Members of Parliament who attended the school include Andrew Little, John Armstrong, Bruce Beetham, Merv Wellington, Cam Calder and Ken Comber. Harry Barker was mayor of Gisborne for 27 years. Former Supreme Court judge Bill Wilson also attended the school.

Australian media personality and Senator for Victoria, Australia Derryn Hinch attended New Plymouth Boys' High.

== See also ==
- List of schools in New Zealand
