= New Plymouth District =

- Territorial authority district
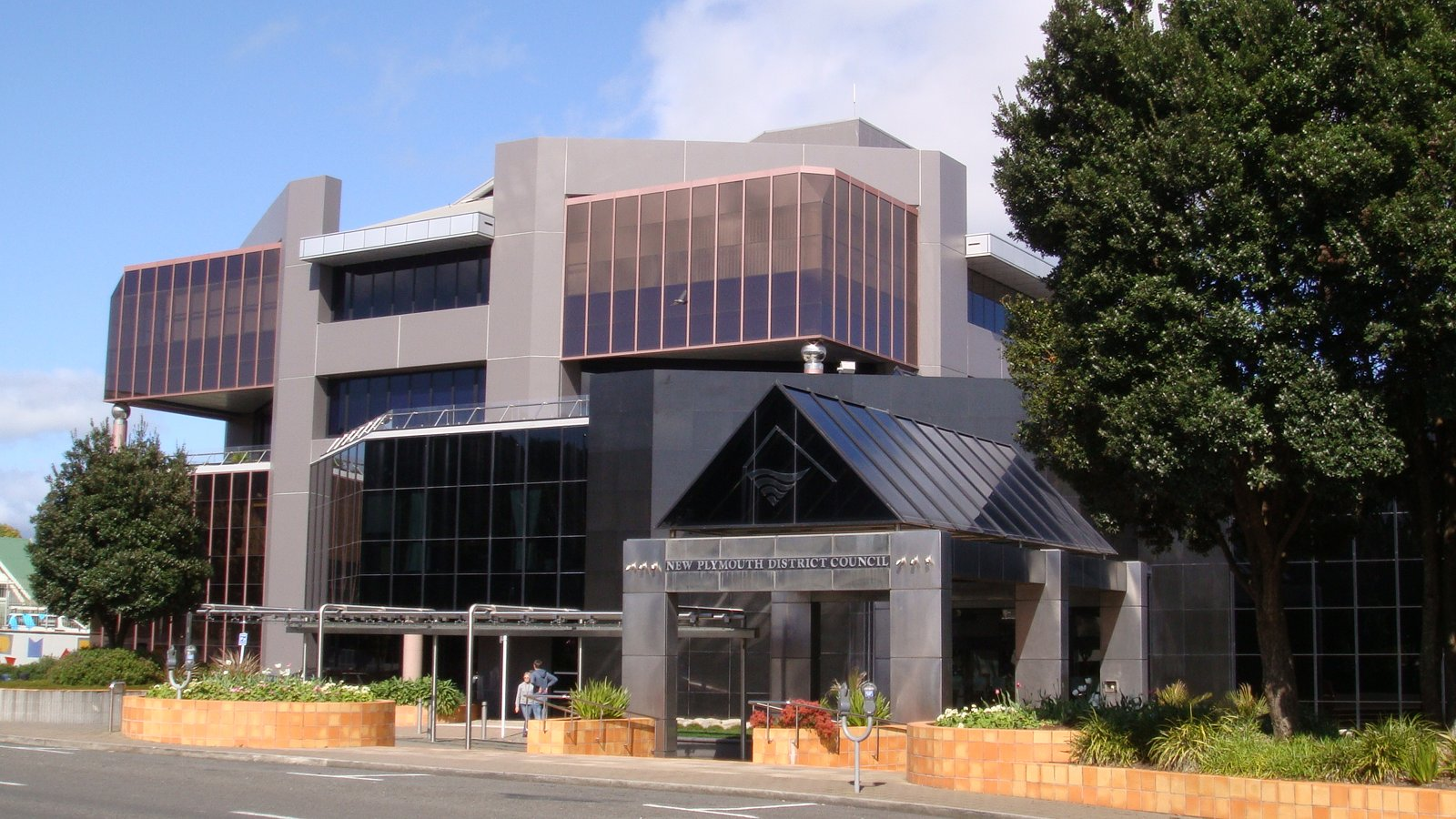
- New Plymouth District Council offices

- New Plymouth district within the North Island
- Coordinates: 39°05′53″S 174°14′38″E
- Country: New Zealand
- Region: Taranaki
- Wards: Kaitake-Ngāmotu; Kōhanga Moa; North; Te Purutanga Mauri Pūmanawa (Māori Ward)
- Community Bards: Kaitake; Puketapu-Bell Block; Inglewood; Clifton; Waitara
- Seat: New Plymouth

Government
  - Mayor: Max Brough
  - MP: David MacLeod
  - Territorial authority: New Plymouth District Council

Area
  - Land: 2,205.59 km^{2} (851.58 sq mi)

Population (June 2025)
  - Total: 90,100
  - Density: 40.9/km^{2} (106/sq mi)
- Time zone: UTC+12 (NZST)
  - Summer (DST): UTC+13 (NZDT)
- Postcode(s): Map of postcodes
- Website: www.newplymouthnz.com

The New Plymouth District (Māori: Te Rohe o Ngāmotu) is one of the districts of New Zealand within Taranaki. It includes the city of New Plymouth and smaller towns such as Bell Block, Waitara, Ōakura and Inglewood.

In 1989, as a part of New Zealand-wide reorganisation of local government, New Plymouth City Council was merged with North Taranaki District Council, Inglewood District Council, and Clifton County Council to form the New Plymouth District Council.

== Demographics ==
New Plymouth District covers 2,205.59 km^{2} (851.58 sq mi) and had an estimated population of 90,100 as of June 2025, with a population density of 41 people per km^{2}. The New Plymouth District is the 11th largest district (out of 67) in New Zealand.

Historical population
Year	Pop.	±% p.a.
2006	68,901	—
2013	74,184	+1.06%
2018	80,679	+1.69%
2023	87,000	+1.52%

New Plymouth District had a population of 87,000 in the 2023 New Zealand census, an increase of 6,321 people (7.8%) since the 2018 census, and an increase of 12,816 people (17.3%) since the 2013 census. There were 42,552 males, 44,151 females and 300 people of other genders in 33,537 dwellings. 2.7% of people identified as LGBTIQ+. The median age was 40.7 years (compared with 38.1 years nationally). There were 17,190 people (19.8%) aged under 15 years, 14,148 (16.3%) aged 15 to 29, 38,583 (44.3%) aged 30 to 64, and 17,076 (19.6%) aged 65 or older.

People could identify as more than one ethnicity. The results were 84.0% European (Pākehā); 20.0% Māori; 2.5% Pasifika; 6.6% Asian; 0.9% Middle Eastern, Latin American and African New Zealanders (MELAA); and 2.7% other, which includes people giving their ethnicity as "New Zealander". English was spoken by 97.3%, Māori language by 4.0%, Samoan by 0.3% and other languages by 7.7%. No language could be spoken by 2.0% (e.g. too young to talk). New Zealand Sign Language was known by 0.4%. The percentage of people born overseas was 17.0, compared with 28.8% nationally.

Religious affiliations were 31.0% Christian, 1.1% Hindu, 0.6% Islam, 0.6% Māori religious beliefs, 0.4% Buddhist, 0.5% New Age, 0.1% Jewish, and 1.2% other religions. People who answered that they had no religion were 56.3%, and 8.3% of people did not answer the census question.

Of those at least 15 years old, 10,245 (14.7%) people had a bachelor's or higher degree, 39,066 (56.0%) had a post-high school certificate or diploma, and 16,749 (24.0%) people exclusively held high school qualifications. The median income was $39,200, compared with $41,500 nationally. 7,662 people (11.0%) earned over $100,000 compared to 12.1% nationally. The employment status of those at least 15 was that 33,765 (48.4%) people were employed full-time, 10,656 (15.3%) were part-time, and 1,725 (2.5%) were unemployed.

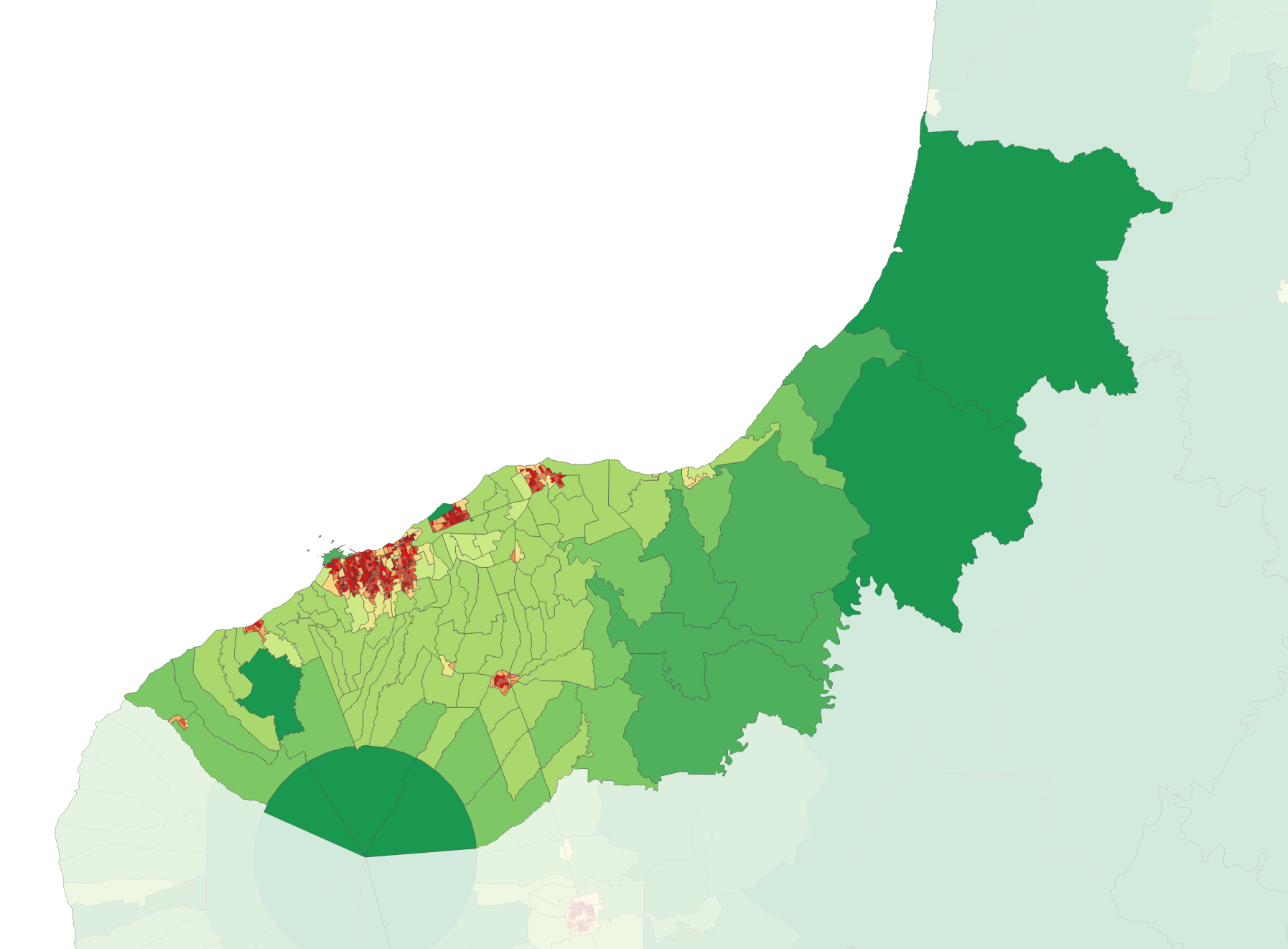
Population density in the 2023 census

Individual 2018 wards
Name	Area (km^{2})	Population	Density (per km^{2})	Dwellings	Median age	Median income
Kaitake-Ngāmotu General Ward	350.92	63,966	182	24,852	40.9 years	$39,500
North General Ward	1,149.80	12,198	11	4,680	40.1 years	$35,200
Kōhanga Moa General Ward	704.88	10,836	15	4,005	40.4 years	$42,700
New Zealand					38.1 years	$41,500

== Local government ==
Every three years, the Mayor, 14 councillors and 20 community board members are elected by the New Plymouth District’s enrolled voters. The full council, subcommittees and standing committees meet on a six-weekly cycle. The current serving Mayor of New Plymouth is Max Brough.

The Strategy and Operations Committee, Te Huinga Taumata and Finance and Risk committee meetings are part of this meeting. cycle. There are five community boards – Clifton, Waitara, Inglewood and Kaitake and Puketapu-Bell – as well as the subcommittees and working parties.

The Chief Executive and approximately 530 full-time equivalent staff provide advice and information to the elected members and the public, implement council decisions and manage the district’s day-to-day operations. The current chief executive, Gareth Green, was appointed in December 2022.

The district's day-to-day operations include maintaining more than 110 parks and reserves, waste water management and issuing consents and permits, through to providing libraries and other recreational services and ensuring the district’s eateries meet health standards.

New Plymouth District Council's annual operating revenue for 2022/2023 was $210.946 million.

== See also ==
- Mayor of New Plymouth
- Harry Duynhoven
