= Bell Block, New Zealand =

Settlement in Taranaki Region, New Zealand

Bell Block
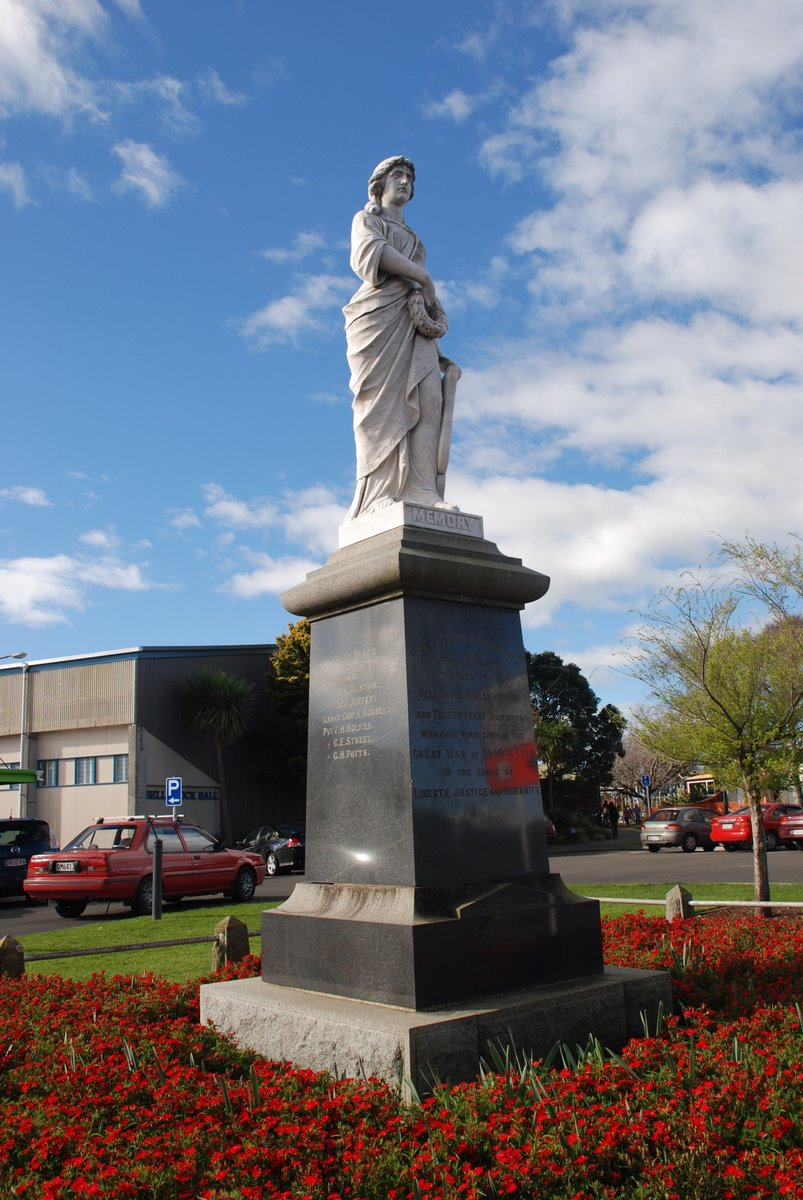
- WWI memorial
- Interactive map of Bell Block
- Coordinates: 39°1′48″S 174°8′43″E
- Country: New Zealand
- Region: Taranaki Region
- Territorial authority: New Plymouth District
- Ward: Kaitake-Ngāmotu General Ward; Te Purutanga Mauri Pūmanawa Māori Ward
- Community: Puketapu-Bell Block Community
- Electorates: New Plymouth; Te Tai Hauāuru (Māori)

Government
  - Territorial Authority: New Plymouth District Council
  - Regional council: Taranaki Regional Council
  - Mayor of New Plymouth: Max Brough
  - New Plymouth MP: David MacLeod
  - Te Tai Hauāuru MP: Debbie Ngarewa-Packer

Area
  - Total: 11.93 km^{2} (4.61 sq mi)

Population (June 2025)
  - Total: 8,290
  - Density: 695/km^{2} (1,800/sq mi)

Bell Block is a town in Taranaki, New Zealand. State Highway 3 runs through it. It is 6 km north-east of the centre of New Plymouth and 1 km from the outer edge of New Plymouth at Waiwhakaiho. Waitara is about 9 km to the north-east. New Plymouth Airport is located immediately to the north-east of Bell Block.

== History and culture ==
The land was purchased in November 1848 by Dillon Bell from the Puketapu iwi. The initial purchase was 1,500 acres (610 ha) but more land was added subsequently. Disagreements over the sale of the land contributed to the First Taranaki War. A blockhouse was built by local settlers in early 1860, in order to protect their homes and farms during heightened tensions just prior to the advent of the First Taranaki War. When government troops arrived, a full stockade was built at the site, known as Bell Block Stockade, Bell Blockhouse or Hua Blockhouse. During this time, almost all Bell Block residents took refuge at New Plymouth. Some of the earthworks continued until 1972 when a hotel was built on the site.

Much of New Plymouth's heavy and medium industry is situated around Bell Block, which led to heavy traffic congestion. Construction of an arterial bypass of the town commenced in late 2006. A previously unknown Māori Pā site was discovered during site investigations and was excavated by archaeologists prior to construction.

=== Marae ===
Muru Raupatu marae and meeting house is a meeting place for the Puketapu hapū.

In October 2020, the Government committed $817,845 from the Provincial Growth Fund to upgrade it and Te Kohanga Moa marae, creating 15 jobs.

== Demographics ==
Bell Block covers 11.93 km^{2} (4.61 sq mi) and had an estimated population of 8,290 as of June 2025, with a population density of 695 people per km^{2}.

Historical population
Year	Pop.	±% p.a.
2006	4,578	—
2013	5,859	+3.59%
2018	7,041	+3.74%
2023	7,869	+2.25%

Bell Block had a population of 7,869 in the 2023 New Zealand census, an increase of 828 people (11.8%) since the 2018 census, and an increase of 2,010 people (34.3%) since the 2013 census. There were 3,810 males, 4,038 females, and 21 people of other genders in 2,889 dwellings. 1.8% of people identified as LGBTIQ+. There were 1,584 people (20.1%) aged under 15 years, 1,245 (15.8%) aged 15 to 29, 3,318 (42.2%) aged 30 to 64, and 1,719 (21.8%) aged 65 or older.

People could identify as more than one ethnicity. The results were 79.0% European (Pākehā); 19.0% Māori; 3.4% Pasifika; 11.9% Asian; 0.9% Middle Eastern, Latin American and African New Zealanders (MELAA); and 2.2% other, which includes people giving their ethnicity as "New Zealander". English was spoken by 96.2%, Māori by 3.1%, Samoan by 0.7%, and other languages by 10.4%. No language could be spoken by 2.3% (e.g. too young to talk). New Zealand Sign Language was known by 0.5%. The percentage of people born overseas was 20.1, compared with 28.8% nationally.

Religious affiliations were 33.3% Christian, 2.4% Hindu, 0.7% Islam, 0.6% Māori religious beliefs, 0.4% Buddhist, 0.4% New Age, and 2.4% other religions. People who answered that they had no religion were 52.0%, and 8.1% of people did not answer the census question.

Of those at least 15 years old, 1,008 (16.0%) people had a bachelor's or higher degree, 3,558 (56.6%) had a post-high school certificate or diploma, and 1,725 (27.4%) people exclusively held high school qualifications. 663 people (10.5%) earned over $100,000 compared to 12.1% nationally. The employment status of those at least 15 was 3,036 (48.3%) full-time, 798 (12.7%) part-time, and 135 (2.1%) unemployed.

Individual statistical areas
Name	Area (km^{2})	Population	Density (per km^{2})	Dwellings	Median age	Median income
Bell Block West	3.89	3,444	885	1,287	42.1 years	$37,300
Bell Block Central	1.11	2,895	2,608	1,056	37.8 years	$37,600
Bell Block East-Puketapu	6.93	1,530	221	546	39.6 years	$48,700
New Zealand					38.1 years	$41,500

== Features and attractions ==
The Waipu Lagoons are North Taranaki's only wetland area. The lagoons are home to a variety of wildlife, and are an important natural home for the endangered Australasian bittern.

In December 2014 the northern end of New Plymouth's coastal walkway was extended from Hickford Park, Bell Block through to Tirimoana Crescent, making it possible to cycle or walk from Bell Block into central New Plymouth.

The construction of Taranaki's first world-class BMX facility began in Bell Block in July 2015 and was completed in early 2016.

The BMX track is the latest addition to the Bell Block cycle park, which includes a 1.75 km closed road circuit with two separate 1 km loops and a 333-metre velodrome. The cycle park also has a collection of tracks for children including a miniature town route with traffic lights, a roundabout, railway crossing, accessible car parks, pedestrian crossing and speed bumps, all scaled down to 60 per cent of the original size, to help teach children safety while cycling.

== Education ==
Bell Block School and Puketapu School are coeducational full primary (years 1–8) schools with rolls of 446 and 318 students respectively as of July 2026. Bell Block School celebrated the 150th anniversary of education in Bell Block in 2006. The present school dates from 1872. It reached a roll of almost 700 pupils in 1979, which dropped once Puketapu School was built in 1980.

== Transport ==
Devon Road, part of State Highway 3, travels through Bell Block running west towards Waiwhakaiho and New Plymouth and east towards Waitara. Citylink buses connect the suburb to both locations.

Bell Block railway station was located at the Southern edge of Bell Block. It closes in 1986 except to private sidings.The former Corbett Road railway station also served the area before closing in 1963.
