= New Plymouth District Council =

Territorial authority of New Zealand

Coordinates: 39.0593996°S 174.0745926°E

New Plymouth District Council Te Kaunihera ā-Rohe o Ngāmotu
- Brand logo

Type
- Type: Territorial authority of New Plymouth District
- Term limits: None

History
- Established: 1 November 1989; 36 years ago
- Preceded by: New Plymouth City Council; North Taranaki District Council; Inglewood District Council; Clifton County Council
- New session started: 18 October 2025

Leadership
- Mayor: Max Brough, Ind. since 18 October 2025
- Deputy: Moira George, Ind. since 1 May 2026
- CEO: Steve Ruru since March 2026

Structure
- Seats: 15 (including mayor)
- Political groups: Independent (14); ACT Local (1)

Elections
- Voting system: First past the post
- First election: 14 October 1989
- Last election: 11 October 2025
- Next election: 14 October 2028

Meeting place
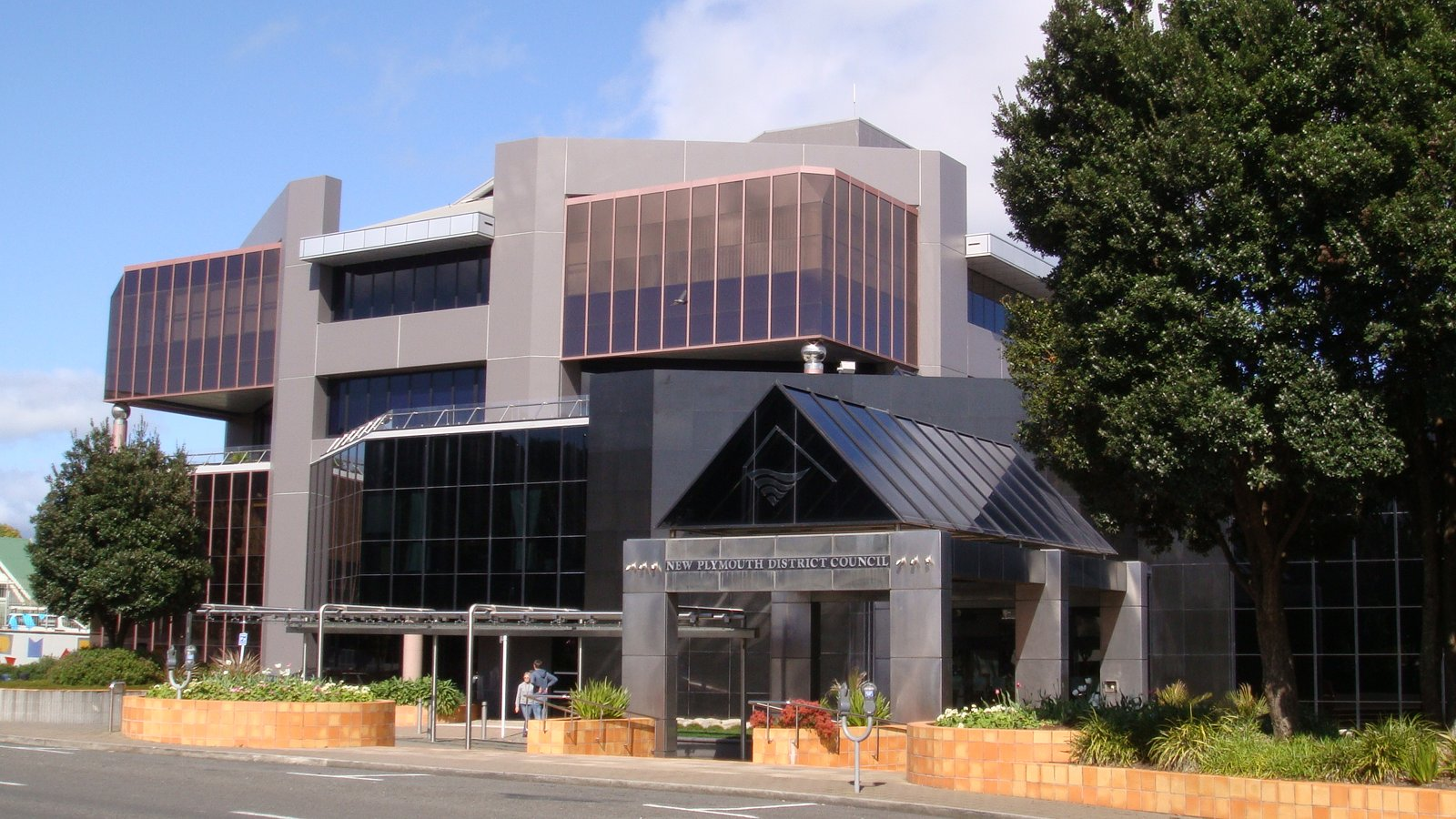
- Civic Centre, 84 Liadet St, New Plymouth

Website
- npdc.govt.nz

New Plymouth District Council (abbr. NPDC; Māori: Te Kaunihera ā-rohe o Ngāmotu) is the territorial authority for the New Plymouth District of New Zealand. It serves as the district's local government alongside the Taranaki Regional Council as the regional council. The current entity has existed since 1989, prior to which local government in the area was split between four local authorities.

The governing body of the council has 14 councillors and is chaired by the mayor of New Plymouth (currently Max Brough since October 2025).

== History ==
=== Predecessors ===
New Plymouth Province was established in 1853, renamed Taranaki Province in 1859, and disestablished in 1876.

=== 1989 reforms ===
The current council was established in 1989, by merging New Plymouth City Council with Clifton County Council (established in 1885), Inglewood County Council (established in 1902), and Waitara County Council (established in 1904).

=== 2026 reform proposals ===
In response to the Sixth National Government's call for "Head Start" proposals for council amalgamations, NPDC devised what it called a "Pathfinder" proposal as a way of avoiding the need to firmly decide on an option ahead of the 9 August deadline and be able to choose one of five different options for the structure of local government in Taranaki. NPDC developed the proposal alongside Taranaki Regional Council, despite regional councils being excluded from the local government reform process. Neighboring Stratford District Council and South Taranaki District Council instead choose to submit an amalgamation proposal that would exclude New Plymouth.

== Functions ==
As the territorial authority for the New Plymouth District, NPDC fulfils a wide range of local government functions, with the exception of those that are the responsibility of regional councils, which are instead fulfilled by Taranaki Regional Council.

=== Water ===
The council provides three waters services to the district and is responsible for managing the corresponding infrastructure, including (as of 2025) 300+ km of stormwater pipes, 692 km of wastewater pipes supported by 34 pump stations, a centralised wastewater treatment plant, and four water supply facilities. 25 million litres of wastewater is treated and 30 million litres of drinkable water is supplied daily. As of 2025, drinking water is supplied to 29,558 properties while wastewater is collected from 31,207. In the 2024/2025 financial year, the council spent approximately $29m (operating) and $36m (capital) on wastewater treatment, $23m (operating) and $15m (capital) on drinkable water supply, and $2.6m (operating) along with $4m (capital) on stormwater management.

In response to higher-than-average water usage within the district, NPDC began installing water meters in 2022 to enable it to move from a flat rate model to a metered water charge model, with the aim of reducing water usage by 20%. Charges based on volumetric water usage are expected to be implemented in 2027, but have prompted concerns from apartment owners who have to share one water meter between multiple units.

As of 2026, the council is establishing a water services council-controlled organisation that is expected to take over responsibility for drinking water and wastewater on 1 July 2027.

=== Transport ===
The council is responsible for managing most land transport infrastructure in the district, including (as of 2025) 1,313 km of local roads, 255 bridges and tunnels or large culverts, 326 retaining walls, and 537 km of footpath. In the 2024/2025 financial year, approximately $43m (operating) and $19m (capital) was spent by the council on transport.

In 2025, NPDC and NZTA collaborated to install dedicated cycle lanes, with concrete separators, on a section of State Highway 45 running through New Plymouth. The project was fully funded by NZTA and part of its Transport Choices programme. The concrete separators attracted controversy, with some complaining about lost carparks and vehicles being damaged from hitting the separators. On the other hand, cyclists praised the separators for ensuring that cars gave them enough space to ride in the cycle lane by stopping cars from driving partially in the cycle lanes. In response to the controversy, NPDC carried out a safety audit to identify if there were any potential improvements that could be made to the design. Incoming mayor, Max Brough, promised to remove the separators as part of his campaign at the 2025 local elections, however council staff recommended that the separators be kept in place so as to allow the impact of them to be monitored before any changes were made. Staff identified that removing the separators would cost $1.63 million and could negatively affect the council's relationship with NZTA due to the inefficiency of replacing NZTA-funded infrastructure shortly after it had been put it place, without allowing time to examine the impacts. The safety audit had also found the cycleway project had significantly improved safety.

While the management of public transport services is the responsibility of the regional council, NPDC as the road controlling authority is responsible for the bus stops that TRC bus services use in the district.

== Governing body ==
=== Mayor ===
One mayor is elected at-large; they chair meetings of the governing body and act as the head of local government in the district.

=== Current composition ===
The current members of the governing body of council are:

Role	Portrait	Name	Affiliation	Ward
Mayor		Max Brough	Independent	Elected at-large
Deputy		Moira George	Independent	Kaitake-Ngāmotu
Councillor		Gordon Brown	Independent	Kaitake-Ngāmotu
Councillor		Graham Chard	Independent	Kaitake-Ngāmotu
Councillor		Damon Fox	ACT Local	Kaitake-Ngāmotu
Councillor		Kerry Vosseler	Independent	Kaitake-Ngāmotu
Councillor		EJ Barrett	Independent	Kaitake-Ngāmotu
Councillor		Te Waka McLeod	Independent	Te Purutanga Mauri Pūmanawa Māori
Councillor		Christine Fabish	Independent	Kōhanga Moa
Councillor		Gina Blackburn	Independent	North
Councillor		Murray Chong	Independent	At-large
Councillor		David Bublitz	Independent	At-large
Councillor		John Woodward	Independent	At-large
Councillor		Sam Bennett	Independent	At-large
Councillor		Dinnie Moeahu	Independent	At-large

== Community boards ==
For some outlying communities of the district, the council has community boards to ensure that the interests of smaller communities are represented and are not drowned out by the larger voice of the city of New Plymouth. There have been calls for more community boards to be established, such as in Bell Block, which resulted in the Puketapu-Bell Block community board being established at the 2022 local elections.

- Clifton Community Board: four members
- Inglewood Community Board: four members
- Kaitake Community Board: four members
- Puketapu-Bell Block: four members
- Waitara Community Board: four members

== Elections ==
=== List ===
==== Mayoral ====
- 1989
- 1992
- 1995
- 1998
- 2001
- 2004
- 2007
- 2010
- 2013
- 2016
- 2019
- 2022
- 2025

==== Council ====
- 1989
- 1992
- 1995
- 1998
- 2001
- 2004
- 2007
- 2010
- 2013
- 2016
- 2019
- 2022
- 2025
