= Public transport in New Plymouth =

Current public transport organisation in New Plymouth and Taranaki

- Te Pahi Taranaki branding, introduced in April 2026

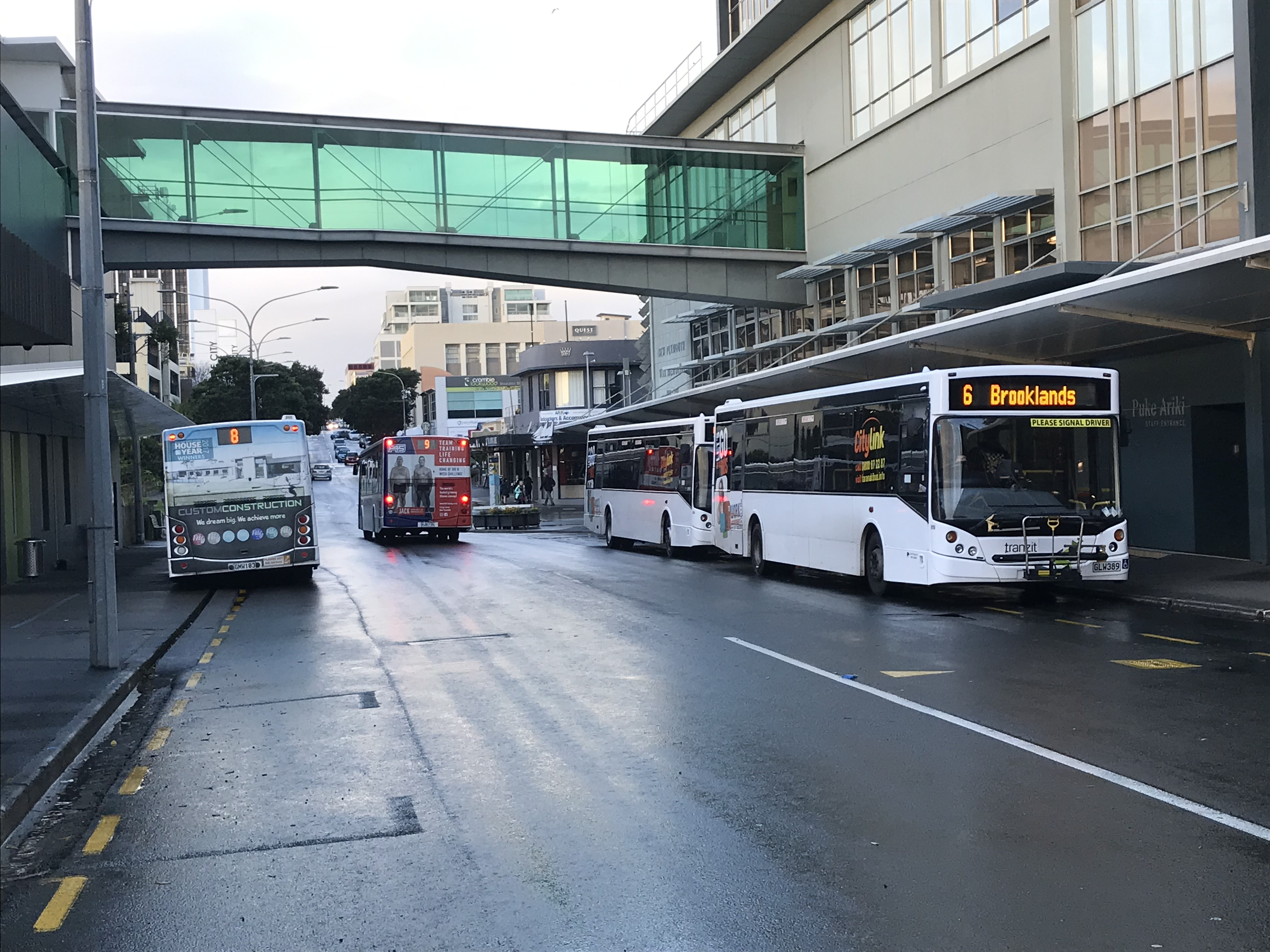
- New Plymouth Bus Centre in 2019

Overview
- Area served: New Plymouth District
- Locale: New Zealand
- Transit type: Bus
- Number of stations: Moturoa; Whalers Gate; Marfell; Hurdon; Frankleigh Park; Vogletown; Welbourn; Merrilands; Fitzroy; Bell Block; Waitara
- Website: Te Pahi Bus website

Operation
- Operator: Tranzit Coachlines
- Number of vehicles: Electric Buses

Public transport in New Plymouth consists primarily of urban and suburban bus services operating under the Te Pahi Taranaki brand in New Plymouth, Taranaki, New Zealand. The network comprises nine principal weekday urban routes, Saturday orbital services, and connections to surrounding communities including Bell Block and Waitara. Most urban routes operate as circular services centred on the Ariki Street bus interchange in the city's central business district.

Services are planned, funded and contracted by the Taranaki Regional Council, with bus stops and associated infrastructure managed by the New Plymouth District Council. The urban bus network is operated by Tranzit Coachlines. On 7 April 2026, the former Citylink network was replaced by Te Pahi Taranaki as part of a regional redesign of bus services, introducing revised routes, improved Saturday connections and a fully electric New Plymouth urban fleet.

Public transport in New Plymouth dates to privately operated horse buses in the late 19th century. The New Plymouth Borough Council introduced an electric tramway in 1916, followed by battery-electric buses in 1919, motor buses in the 1920s and trolleybuses in 1950. The tramways closed in 1954 and the trolleybus system in 1967, leaving motor buses as the sole form of urban public transport. Municipal services continued under New Plymouth City Transport until 1991, when operations passed to private companies. The subsequent Citylink network was introduced in 2008, following the acquisition of Okato Bus Lines by Tranzit.

For the history of municipal services between 1916 and 1991, see New Plymouth City Transport.

== System ==
=== Administration ===
Public transport in New Plymouth is administered by the Taranaki Regional Council, which is responsible for planning, funding and contracting bus services across the region. The New Plymouth District Council is responsible for the provision, management and maintenance of associated infrastructure, including bus stops and shelters, but does not determine bus routes.

Bus services are contracted to private operators, with Tranzit Group operating the New Plymouth urban network. The services are marketed under the Te Pahi Taranaki brand, which replaced Citylink in April 2026. Tranzit also owns and operates the electric buses introduced as part of the redesigned network.

=== Service network ===
The New Plymouth bus network operates under the Te Pahi Taranaki brand, introduced on 7 April 2026 following a comprehensive redesign of the region's public transport services. Replacing the former Citylink network, the changes were intended to provide more direct urban routes, improved access to key destinations and better Saturday coverage. The redesign also included service reductions, particularly to early morning and evening departures, in response to low patronage and funding constraints.

The network comprises nine principal weekday urban routes (Routes 1–9), operating as circular services between central New Plymouth and the surrounding suburbs. Most begin and end at the Ariki Street bus interchange, which serves as the principal hub for the network. Weekday services generally operate between approximately 7.30 am and 6.30 pm, with additional evening departures on Thursdays and Fridays. Saturday services are provided by two orbital routes (10A and 10B), operating clockwise and anticlockwise around the city.

The city network also includes services connecting New Plymouth with Bell Block and Waitara. Weekday services comprise an express route (19) and a regular service via Bell Block (20), supplemented by a Saturday service (11). A separate morning loop (18) operates within Waitara during school terms. Dedicated school bus services operate alongside the regular network.

=== Amenities and accessibility ===
All buses operating on New Plymouth's urban network are wheelchair accessible, with low floors and boarding ramps. The eleven electric buses introduced in April 2026 each provide two wheelchair spaces, with ramps that can be deployed with assistance from the driver. Assistance dogs are permitted on all services.

All urban buses serving New Plymouth, Bell Block and Waitara are equipped with front-mounted bicycle racks, each accommodating up to two bicycles. The racks are available without additional charge.

The electric fleet, manufactured by CRRC and operated by Tranzit Group, features air conditioning, USB charging ports and wide passenger doors. The introduction of the Te Pahi Taranaki network in April 2026 also included a dedicated website with journey-planning facilities and real-time bus tracking.

=== Fares and ticketing ===
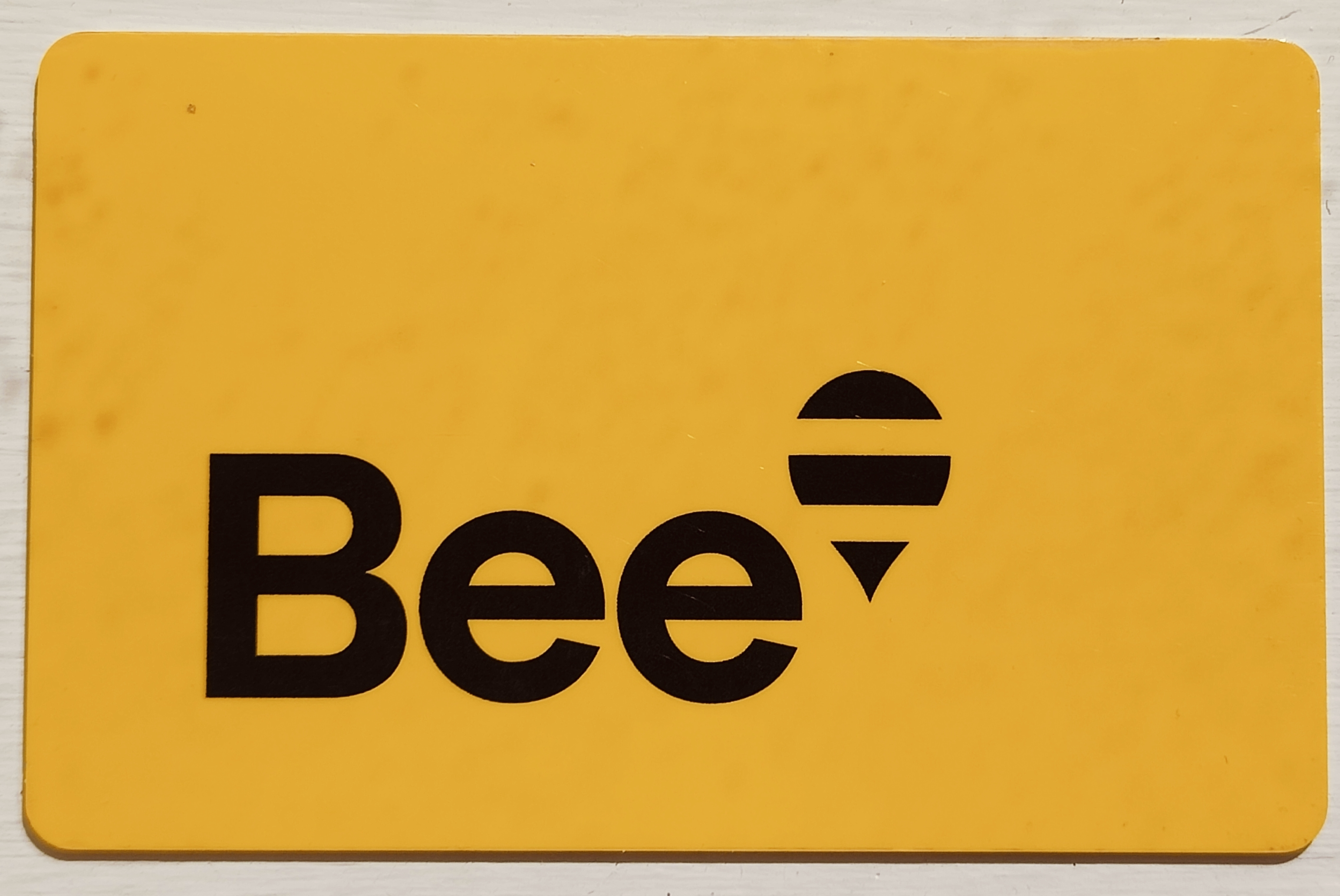
Bee Card, introduced in Taranaki in October 2020

Bus fares in New Plymouth are based on a zone system administered by the Taranaki Regional Council. Passengers can pay using cash or a prepaid Bee Card, with lower fares generally available to cardholders. The Bee Card was introduced on 19 October 2020, replacing cash as the principal means of fare payment for many passengers. The system uses contactless smart cards, with passengers required to tag on when boarding and tag off when leaving the bus.

Concessionary fares are available to several passenger groups. Children under five travel free, while passengers aged 5–18 receive discounted fares. Holders of a Community Services Card are eligible for half-price adult fares through the Community Connect scheme, while SuperGold Card holders receive free off-peak travel. Most concessions require a registered Bee Card.

Passengers transferring between eligible New Plymouth urban and school bus services can make one free transfer. Bee Card users must transfer within 30 minutes of tagging off their previous bus, while passengers paying cash may use a paper ticket for a transfer within one hour of purchase.

==== Transition to Motu Move ====
The national public transport ticketing system, Motu Move, is planned to replace Bee Card in Taranaki in 2027. The transition was initially expected during 2026 but was subsequently deferred. Motu Move will introduce payment by contactless debit and credit cards, compatible mobile devices and a dedicated prepaid card. Until the transition, Bee Card and cash remain the accepted methods of payment on New Plymouth buses.

== Routes ==
The following routes form the New Plymouth city networ, including services to Bell Block and Waitara. Most services operate as circular routes, beginning and ending at the Ariki Street bus interchange in central New Plymouth.

The weekday urban routes generally operate from Monday to Friday, excluding public holidays. Most routes have an additional evening departure on Thursdays and Fridays, but do not operate on weekends. Saturday services are provided by two orbital routes operating in opposite directions, together with a separate service between Waitara, Bell Block and New Plymouth.

Route	Route name	Areas served	Major destinations and notes
Weekday urban routes
1	Moturoa	Moturoa, Spotswood	Circular service via St Aubyn Street, Pioneer Road and Ngāmotu Road.
2	Whalers Gate	Lynmouth, Blagdon, Spotswood, Whalers Gate	Circular service via Devon Street West, South Road and Barrett Road.
3	Lynmouth/Marfell	Lynmouth, Marfell	Taranaki Base Hospital, Francis Douglas Memorial College. The route was amended in August 2026 to serve the hospital's main entrance and reinstate stops on Doone Street.
4	Westown/Hurdon	Westown, Hurdon	Taranaki Base Hospital, Francis Douglas Memorial College, Rotokare / Barrett Lagoon.
5	Frankleigh Park	Frankleigh Park	Via Glenpark Avenue, Govett Avenue and Frankley Road.
6	Vogeltown/Brooklands	Vogeltown, Brooklands	Pukekura Park, Bowl of Brooklands.
7	Welbourn/Highlands Park	Welbourn, Merrilands, Highlands Park	WITT, Highlands Intermediate.
8	Merrilands	Merrilands, Highlands Park, Mangorei	Merrilands Medical Centre, Riverside Care Home.
9	Fitzroy/The Valley/Glen Avon	Strandon, Fitzroy, Glen Avon	The Valley Shopping Centre.
Saturday services
10A	Saturday Orbiter Clockwise	Strandon, Merrilands, Brooklands, Vogeltown, Frankleigh Park, Westown, Spotswood, Moturoa	Clockwise circular route connecting the western, southern and eastern suburbs. Three circuits operate each Saturday.
10B	Saturday Orbiter Anti-clockwise	Moturoa, Spotswood, Westown, Frankleigh Park, Vogeltown, Brooklands, Merrilands, Strandon	Anti-clockwise counterpart to Route 10A, with three circuits each Saturday.
11	Saturday Waitara/Bell Block/New Plymouth	Bell Block, Waitara	Three services in each direction on Saturdays.
Waitara and Bell Block services
18	Waitara Morning Loop	Waitara	One morning journey on weekdays during school terms, serving Waitara schools. The route was revised in August 2026 to travel via Queen Street and West Quay.
19	Waitara–New Plymouth Express	New Plymouth, Waitara	Two return journeys on weekdays, providing a more direct connection between the two centres.
20	Waitara/Bell Block/New Plymouth	Fitzroy, Glen Avon, Bell Block, Waitara	Six return journeys on weekdays. Since August 2026, all services travel through The Valley in both directions.

An additional weekday morning service, numbered 7/8H, combines parts of Routes 7 and 8. Operating between Mangorei, Merrilands, Welbourn and the central city, it provides a single earlier journey.

Routes 1–9 generally have an additional departure at 6.20 pm on Thursdays and Fridays. Monday–Wednesday evening departures were withdrawn as part of the April 2026 network redesign, reflecting patronage and funding constraints.

The routes are complemented by dedicated school services and regional bus services connecting New Plymouth with other Taranaki towns, which operate separately from the city network.

== History ==
=== Early services and municipal operation (1894–1991) ===
Public transport in New Plymouth began with privately operated horse buses in the late 19th century. Regular services developed during the 1890s, initially connecting the town centre with surrounding settlements such as Fitzroy.

In 1916, the New Plymouth Borough Council opened an electric tramway system, which became the principal form of public transport in the growing borough. The council introduced battery-electric buses in 1919, followed by motor buses in the 1920s, initially to supplement the tramways and extend services beyond the tramway network. The first trolleybuses entered service in 1950, replacing the Westown tram route. The remaining tramways closed in 1954, and trolleybus operation ended in 1967.

Petrol and diesel buses subsequently became the sole means of municipal public transport. Services were operated by New Plymouth City Transport until 1991, when the council sold its bus fleet and operations to the Hamilton-based Gold Star Bus Lines, ending direct municipal operation of the city's public transport services.

=== Private operation and Okato Bus Lines (1991–2008) ===
Gold Star Bus Lines acquired the municipal operation on 30 July 1991, but the company experienced financial difficulties and entered liquidation within months. In December 1991, Okato Bus Lines assumed operation of many of the former municipal routes, employing several former City Transport staff and initially using older buses.

The transition resulted in a reduced network. Okato initially operated the commercially viable routes, while services to Merrilands and Frankleigh Park were provided by the New Plymouth Taxi Society. Evening and most weekend services were withdrawn, leaving two Saturday circular routes.

In the mid-1990s, Okato took over the New Plymouth–Waitara service via Bell Block following the receivership of Withatruck Coachlines. This brought the principal urban and Waitara services under the same operator, an arrangement that continued under subsequent operators.

In 2006, the Taranaki Regional Council introduced a two-year trial of expanded subsidised bus services, operated by Okato. The trial preceded a change in ownership and a wider reorganisation of public transport services in the district.

=== Citylink (2008–2026) ===
Citylink branding used before the introduction of Te Pahi Taranaki in April 2026.

On 1 July 2008, Tranzit Coachlines acquired Okato Bus Lines and took over its urban, regional and school bus operations. The services were introduced under the new Citylink brand, bringing a common identity to the city's public bus network.

On 31 May 2010, the Citylink network underwent a significant expansion as part of a trial programme intended to increase patronage. Changes included extended operating hours and improved route coverage, supported by funding from the regional council and the NZ Transport Agency. Following public consultation and evaluation, the expanded services were confirmed as permanent in 2012.

The Citylink network comprised nine principal weekday urban routes (1–9), operating from central New Plymouth to surrounding suburbs. Saturday services were provided by two longer circular routes, known as Saturday West (10) and Saturday East (11), each operating two return journeys. The network also included services to Bell Block and Waitara, principally Routes 19 and 20, which operated with several route variations.

In April 2024, Taranaki's first battery-electric bus in over 90 years was introduced on Citylink services in New Plymouth, marking the beginning of the network's transition away from diesel-powered vehicles. The bus was funded jointly by Waka Kotahi NZ Transport Agency through its Climate Emergency Response Fund and the operator, Tranzit Group. It operated across the city's urban routes, with the regional council estimating annual savings of approximately 18,500 litres of diesel.

Although the network continued to evolve, this general arrangement remained in place until the introduction of Te Pahi Taranaki in April 2026.

=== Network redesign and Te Pahi Taranaki (2023–present) ===
==== Planning and consultation ====
In late 2023, the Taranaki Regional Council began consulting on future public transport provision through its Better Travel Choices programme, seeking feedback on destinations, service frequency and weekend coverage. Further engagement during 2024 included the Hop on Board and Where to next? consultations, the latter presenting two options for a redesigned network. The preferred option was a balanced network combining more direct services with wider access to key destinations.

Planning also included a review of the network's branding. In 2025, the council proposed Te Pahi Taranaki as a unified identity for its public bus services, replacing the separate Citylink, Southlink and Connector brands. The rebranding was intended to address concerns that existing information, signage and network identities were confusing for passengers. The project had a budget of approximately $50,000 spread over two years.

The redesign also required changes to existing bus stops and the installation of new ones. Consultation on proposed stop locations in January 2026 attracted criticism because residents were asked to comment before the final routes had been published. Public transport advocate Suraya Sidhu Singh questioned whether meaningful feedback on stop locations was possible without knowing the routes they would serve. The regional council responded that the consultation was intended to address local accessibility, safety and property concerns associated with the proposed stops.

==== Introduction of Te Pahi ====
The redesigned Te Pahi Taranaki network commenced operation on 7 April 2026, replacing Citylink in New Plymouth and introducing a common brand across Taranaki's urban, regional and school bus services. The changes included more direct urban routes, improved access to Taranaki Base Hospital, additional coverage in Highlands Park and Merrilands, and a revised Saturday network featuring clockwise and anticlockwise orbital services. A new Saturday connection between Waitara, Bell Block and New Plymouth was also introduced.

The redesign was implemented within funding constraints and involved the withdrawal of some less-used services. Several early-morning departures were removed, while the 6.20 pm evening services were restricted to Thursdays and Fridays. The changes also introduced a dedicated public transport website offering journey planning and real-time bus information.

The launch coincided with the introduction of eleven new electric buses, manufactured by CRRC and owned and operated by Tranzit Group. The vehicles replaced diesel buses on New Plymouth's urban services, making the urban fleet fully electric. The regional council estimated that the change would save approximately 560 litres of diesel each weekday and reduce carbon dioxide emissions by around 1.51 tonnes daily.

Following the introduction of the new network, further adjustments were made in response to passenger feedback. From 17 August 2026, Route 3 was changed to serve the main entrance of Taranaki Base Hospital and reinstate stops in Doone Street, while the Waitara morning loop (Route 18) and the Waitara–Bell Block–New Plymouth service (Route 20) also underwent route and timetable changes.

=== Rail ===
Although New Plymouth did not develop a dedicated suburban passenger railway network, regional and long-distance trains provided passenger connections between the city, surrounding settlements and other parts of New Zealand for more than a century.

The first railway opened between New Plymouth and Waitara in 1875. Construction subsequently extended southwards, reaching Stratford in 1879 and Hāwera in 1881. The railway eventually provided connections to Whanganui and Wellington, while the opening of the Stratford–Okahukura line in 1933 established a shorter route to Auckland via Taumarunui.

Passenger trains served New Plymouth and intermediate stations including Eliot Street, Fitzroy, Smart Road, Egmont Road and Bell Block. Services included trains and later railcars operating between New Plymouth and Wellington, Whanganui, Auckland and Taumarunui.

Regular passenger services progressively declined during the second half of the 20th century. The last Wellington–New Plymouth railcar operated on 30 July 1977, while the remaining New Plymouth–Taumarunui passenger train was withdrawn on 21 January 1983, ending scheduled passenger railway services to the city.
