= Ferndale, New Plymouth =

Suburb of New Plymouth, New Zealand

Ferndale
- Suburb
- Interactive map of Ferndale
- Coordinates: 39.086°S 174.063°E
- Country: New Zealand
- City: New Plymouth
- Local authority: New Plymouth District Council
- Electoral ward: Kaitake-Ngāmotu General Ward; Te Purutanga Mauri Pūmanawa Māori Ward

Area
  - Land: 304 ha (750 acres)

Population (June 2025)
  - Total: 1,020
  - Density: 336/km^{2} (869/sq mi)

Hurdon	Westown	Frankleigh Park
Omata	Ferndale	Vogeltown
	Hurworth	Ridgewood

Ferndale is a suburb of New Plymouth, in the western North Island of New Zealand. It is located to the south of the city centre.

Ferndale Hall was built in the 1960s after fundraising by the Ferndale Progressive Association.

== Demographics ==
Ferndale covers 3.04 km^{2} (1.17 sq mi) and had an estimated population of 1,020 as of June 2025, with a population density of 336 people per km^{2}.

Historical population
Year	Pop.	±% p.a.
2006	669	—
2013	813	+2.82%
2018	882	+1.64%
2023	978	+2.09%
The 2006 population is for a smaller area of 1.79 km^{2}. Source:

Ferndale had a population of 978 in the 2023 New Zealand census, an increase of 96 people (10.9%) since the 2018 census, and an increase of 165 people (20.3%) since the 2013 census. There were 474 males, 501 females, and 3 people of other genders in 369 dwellings. 2.5% of people identified as LGBTIQ+. The median age was 40.4 years (compared with 38.1 years nationally). There were 198 people (20.2%) aged under 15 years, 156 (16.0%) aged 15 to 29, 465 (47.5%) aged 30 to 64, and 159 (16.3%) aged 65 or older.

People could identify as more than one ethnicity. The results were 92.0% European (Pākehā); 12.3% Māori; 1.5% Pasifika; 3.1% Asian; 0.9% Middle Eastern, Latin American and African New Zealanders (MELAA); and 3.7% other, which includes people giving their ethnicity as "New Zealander". English was spoken by 97.5%, Māori by 2.1%, and other languages by 6.4%. No language could be spoken by 2.1% (e.g. too young to talk). New Zealand Sign Language was known by 0.6%. The percentage of people born overseas was 18.4, compared with 28.8% nationally.

Religious affiliations were 29.8% Christian, 0.3% Hindu, 0.3% Islam, 0.3% Buddhist, 0.3% New Age, and 1.5% other religions. People who answered that they had no religion were 58.9%, and 8.9% of people did not answer the census question.

Of those at least 15 years old, 228 (29.2%) people had a bachelor's or higher degree, 432 (55.4%) had a post-high school certificate or diploma, and 126 (16.2%) people exclusively held high school qualifications. The median income was $48,400, compared with $41,500 nationally. 120 people (15.4%) earned over $100,000 compared to 12.1% nationally. The employment status of those at least 15 was 414 (53.1%) full-time, 132 (16.9%) part-time, and 18 (2.3%) unemployed.
