= Spotswood, New Plymouth =

Suburb of New Plymouth, New Zealand

Spotswood
- Suburb
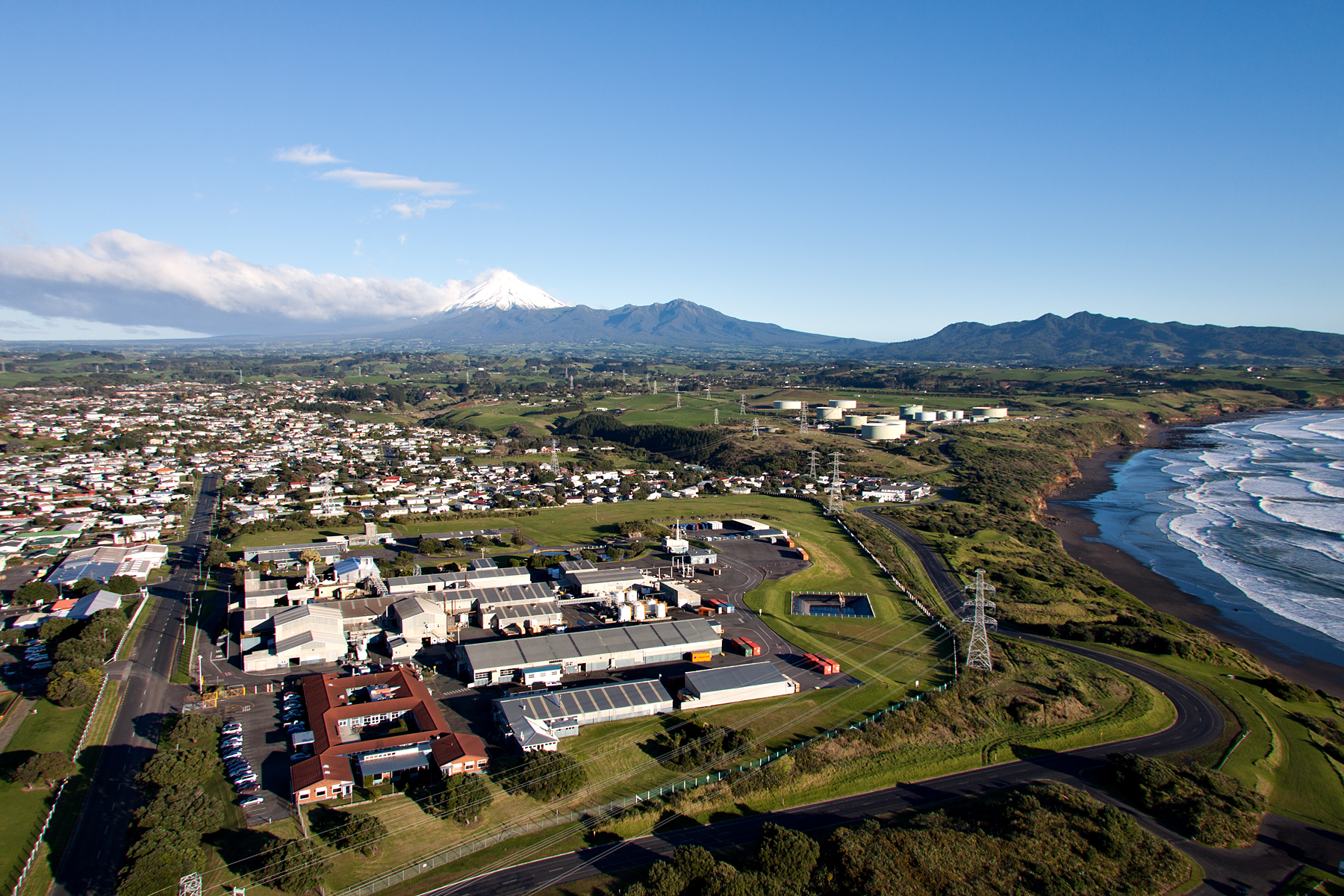
- Interactive map of Spotswood
- Coordinates: 39°4′18″S 174°2′7″E
- Country: New Zealand
- City: New Plymouth
- Local authority: New Plymouth District Council
- Electoral ward: Kaitake-Ngāmotu General Ward; Te Purutanga Mauri Pūmanawa Māori Ward

Area
  - Land: 346 ha (850 acres)

Population (June 2025)
  - Total: 4,030
  - Density: 1,160/km^{2} (3,020/sq mi)

	Moturoa
Paritutu	Spotswood	Lynmouth
Whalers Gate	Hurdon	Marfell

Spotswood is a suburb of New Plymouth in the Taranaki Region of New Zealand. It is located to the west of the city centre.

== History ==
The area in which Spotswood is located was acquired by the New Zealand Government in 1901 and was subdivided in 1902 to be sold in sections from May 1903.

== Demographics ==
Spotswood covers 3.46 km^{2} (1.34 sq mi) and had an estimated population of 4,030 as of June 2025, with a population density of 1,165 people per km^{2}.

Historical population
Year	Pop.	±% p.a.
2006	3,468	—
2013	3,450	−0.07%
2018	3,633	+1.04%
2023	3,864	+1.24%

Spotswood had a population of 3,864 in the 2023 New Zealand census, an increase of 231 people (6.4%) since the 2018 census, and an increase of 414 people (12.0%) since the 2013 census. There were 1,965 males, 1,881 females, and 15 people of other genders in 1,461 dwellings. 3.3% of people identified as LGBTIQ+. The median age was 36.9 years (compared with 38.1 years nationally). There were 744 people (19.3%) aged under 15 years, 771 (20.0%) aged 15 to 29, 1,731 (44.8%) aged 30 to 64, and 621 (16.1%) aged 65 or older.

People could identify as more than one ethnicity. The results were 79.8% European (Pākehā); 27.1% Māori; 4.7% Pasifika; 5.5% Asian; 1.8% Middle Eastern, Latin American and African New Zealanders (MELAA); and 2.6% other, which includes people giving their ethnicity as "New Zealander". English was spoken by 97.0%, Māori by 6.1%, Samoan by 1.2%, and other languages by 8.1%. No language could be spoken by 2.1% (e.g. too young to talk). New Zealand Sign Language was known by 0.5%. The percentage of people born overseas was 15.9, compared with 28.8% nationally.

Religious affiliations were 29.7% Christian, 0.6% Hindu, 0.9% Islam, 0.9% Māori religious beliefs, 0.7% Buddhist, 0.7% New Age, 0.1% Jewish, and 1.3% other religions. People who answered that they had no religion were 57.3%, and 8.1% of people did not answer the census question.

Of those at least 15 years old, 489 (15.7%) people had a bachelor's or higher degree, 1,812 (58.1%) had a post-high school certificate or diploma, and 819 (26.2%) people exclusively held high school qualifications. The median income was $36,500, compared with $41,500 nationally. 216 people (6.9%) earned over $100,000 compared to 12.1% nationally. The employment status of those at least 15 was 1,536 (49.2%) full-time, 450 (14.4%) part-time, and 117 (3.8%) unemployed.

== Education ==
Spotswood College is a secondary (years 9–13) school with a roll of 919 students as of July 2025. It was founded in 1960.

Spotswood Primary is a contributing primary (years 1–6) school with a roll of 228 students as of July 2025. The school opened in 1957.

Te Pi'ipi'inga Kakano Mai Rangiatea is a composite (years 1–13) school with a roll of 152 students as of July 2025. It is a Kura Kaupapa Māori school which teaches in the Māori language. It opened as a primary school in 1994 and became a composite school in 2014.

All the schools are coeducational.
