= Fitzroy railway station =

Fitzroy railway station may refer to:

- Fitzroy railway station, Melbourne, Australia
- Fitzroy railway station, New Zealand
