= Vogeltown =

There are two places in New Zealand named Vogeltown. Both are named after Julius Vogel, a 19th-century prime minister.

- Vogeltown, Wellington is a suburb of Wellington
- Vogeltown, Taranaki is a suburb of New Plymouth
