= Eliot Street railway station =

Railway station in New Plymouth, New Zealand

Eliot Street

General information
- Location: Cnr Eliot and Leach Streets; New Plymouth 4310; New Zealand
- Coordinates: 39°03′24.4″S 174°05′02.0″E
- Elevation: 23 metres (75 ft)
- System: New Zealand Government Railways (NZGR); Regional rail
- Line: Marton–New Plymouth line
- Distance: 1.46 kilometres (0.91 mi) from New Plymouth
- Platforms: Single side
- Tracks: 1

Construction
- Structure type: at-grade
- Parking: no

History
- Opened: 14 October 1875
- Closed: 16 December 1907
Location
Notes
- Previous Station: Smart Road Station; Next Station: New Plymouth station

Eliot Street railway station was a suburban railway station in New Zealand on the Marton–New Plymouth line and the first station leaving New Plymouth. Serving the people of East End, it lasted for 32 years before being replaced by Fitzroy station when the railway line was diverted. The station's history was strongly linked to that of the original railway route out of the city.

== History ==
The construction of the Waitara–New Plymouth railway was one of the first major public works undertaken in Taranaki following the New Zealand Wars. Spearheaded by Julius Vogel's public works and immigration policies, the line was surveyed by Octavius Carrington and built by John Brogden and Sons between 1873 and 1875.

A ceremonial "turning of the first sod" was held on 21 August 1873, and the line officially opened on 14 October 1875. As the first station on the line, Eliot Street station was situated at the top of a steep and winding section of track from central New Plymouth, as the railway crossed New Plymouth's main street, climbed along the Huatoki Stream valley, cross a bridge that spanned the valley and then through a gulley to reach the top of the grade at Leach Street.

Despite the scenic route, the climb was steep—especially the section between Devon and Carrington Streets, where the gradient was 1 in 35—and quickly became a source of operational difficulty.

=== Station site and facilities ===
The station site was modest but functional, consisting of a shelter shed for passengers, a short platform, and a short siding for goods that opened in November 1876. Goods traffic was never very busy, and despite local objections, the freight siding was closed in February 1894.

Passengers were the main source of traffic. The area where the station was located was mostly residential at the time. The station was also the closest stop for New Plymouth High School, which was located at the top of Eliot Street Hill. In 1892, complaints were raised about the behaviour of "some fifteen to twenty boys and girls" waiting at the station, including playing on the rails or climbing over the carriages of the train.

Mixed trains ran daily to and from Waitara and later beyond as the railway extended inland to Inglewood (1877), Stratford (1879) and Hawera (1881), and in 1886 the station would see the New Plymouth Express train passing through (though not stopping) on its way between New Plymouth and Wellington.

=== Notable events ===
On 19 April 1907 tragedy struck when a passenger boarded the last carriage of a train headed to New Plymouth around 10:30 am. A short distance later, he fell from the back platform of the carriage and was lucky not to be killed instantly by the passing guard's van, though he sustained serious injury and died in hospital that night.

== Decline and closure ==
Eliot Street station was well-situated for travellers, particularly those living in the eastern parts of New Plymouth. However, its future was undermined by several factors: a steep and winding approach from the city centre, tight gradients that challenged train operations, and limited space for future expansion. Safety concerns also became increasingly urgent, especially following a series of fatalities at the busy Devon Street level crossing.

In 1904 work began on the Strandon deviation, promising improved safety and operating efficiency. However, not all residents welcomed the change. In July 1906, a letter to the Taranaki Herald expressed concern that the new Fitzroy station would be inconveniently located for existing passengers and that closing Eliot Street would “mean a considerable amount of trouble to a great number of people,” who would now have to walk a much greater distance.

The council resolved in 1906 to demand from the railways (amongst other things) "that a station for the East End of the Borough be provided as near Hobson Street as possible." This wouldn't eventuate until September 1913 when the Autere Street (later East End) platform was opened, a gap of 6 years for residents to find alternate travel arrangements.

On 16 December 1907, the new Strandon deviation opened, including a new suburban station at Fitzroy. The old line through the city was closed the same day, including Eliot Street Station. However, not everybody knew of the closure, with passengers still showing up at Eliot Street the day the new line opened. A porter was sent to direct people to the new station (a 15 to 20-minute walk away), but some would-be passengers missed their train, much to their annoyance. On the day it was reported that "perhaps the only regret occasioned by the closing of the old line is that it was one of the prettiest pieces of line in the North Island, whilst the new railway runs through nothing more beautiful than the barren faces of a cutting."

Work began immediately to remove the tracks for the old route, starting at Waiwaka Terrace. Between 1909 and 1910 the land from the former route had been handed over to the New Plymouth Borough Council and Fitzroy Town Board, much of which became new roads.

== Present day ==
No trace of Eliot Street station remains today. The site, once located at the eastern end of Leach Street near Eliot Street, has been overtaken by urban redevelopment and road reconfiguration. However, portions of the original railway route can still be inferred in the town’s topography.

Notably, the Huatoki Walkway, maintained by the New Plymouth District Council, loosely follows the path of the former railway through the Huatoki valley at Sir Victor Davis Park, past the former flour mill as far as Carrington Street. The YMCA Carpark off Liardet Street still follows the alignment of the railway as it climbed towards Leach Street from the Liardet Street Overbridge.

To the east of the former station site, the former railway route now forms Northgate (part of State Highway 3). The railway line once crossed the Te Henui Stream via a timber bridge. That structure was eventually converted into a road crossing. It became part of Waiwaka Terrace, later replaced by the modern Northgate thoroughfare. While no physical structures remain, these alignments preserve the memory of the original 1875 railway.
