= New Plymouth railway station =

Railway station in New Plymouth, New Zealand

New Plymouth
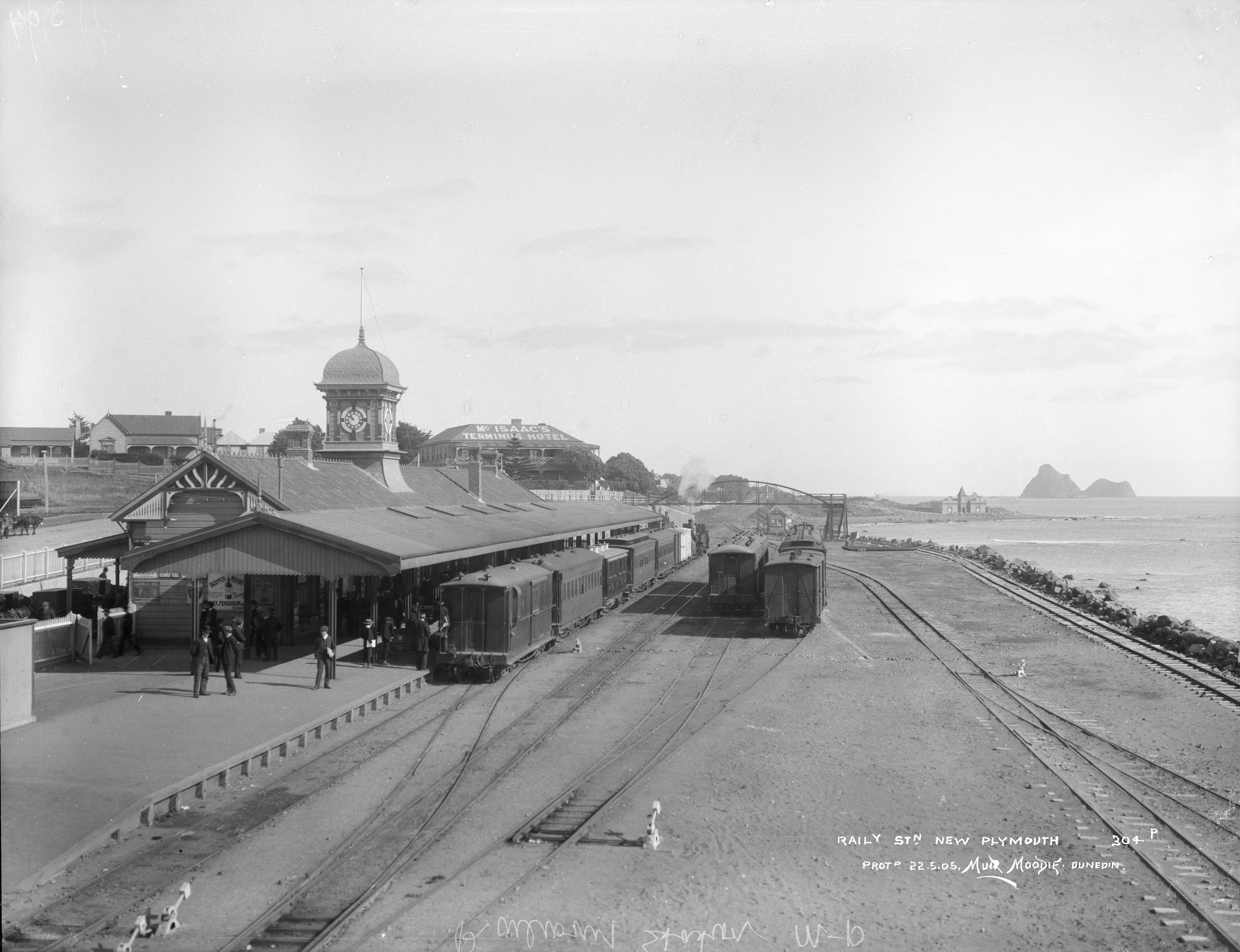
- New Plymouth Troup Vintage railway station in 1905, complete with functioning clock.

General information
- Location: 90 St Aubyn Street; New Plymouth 4310; New Zealand
- Coordinates: 39°03′22.3″S 174°04′13.0″E
- Elevation: 3 metres (9.8 ft)
- System: New Zealand Government Railways (NZGR); Regional rail
- Line: Marton–New Plymouth line
- Distance: 208.93 kilometres (129.82 mi) from Marton
- Platforms: Single side
- Tracks: 1

Construction
- Structure type: at-grade
- Parking: yes
- Architectural style: Vogel-era Class 2 (original); Vintage Troup (second station); Mid-century Modern (final station)

History
- Opened: 14 October 1875
- Closed: 21 January 1983 (passenger); 4 September 1989 (freight)
- Rebuilt: 17 October 1902; 12 December 1961
Location
Notes
- Previous Station (original): Eliot Street Station; Previous Station (new): Fitzroy Station; Next Station: Breakwater

New Plymouth railway station was the primary rail terminus in New Plymouth, Taranaki, New Zealand, for around 115 years. It opened in 1875 as part of the region’s first railway (linking New Plymouth with Waitara).

Over the decades, three different station buildings were constructed on the site: the original 1875 station, a Troup-era replacement in 1902 (complete with clock-tower), and a post-war station in 1961.

The station was the main hub on the Marton–New Plymouth line. Regular passenger services ran until for 108 years until 1983, and the station was formally closed by 1989 when rail yards were relocated out of the city centre. Today, the old station site by the foreshore has been cleared and forms part of New Plymouth’s coastal park and walkway.

== Original station (1875) ==
New Plymouth’s first railway station opened on 14 October 1875, when the Waitara to New Plymouth line began service. The initial station was a simple Vogel-era Class 2 wooden structure located near the beach at the foot of central New Plymouth – at that time the tracks ran right through town and terminated by the foreshore. Early railway operations faced challenges: the approach to the station included a steep incline and several dangerous level crossings in the town centre. As the rail network grew (the line opened to Stratford in 1879 and to Hāwera by 1881), the station and yard were also expanded.

The first station was quickly found to be inadequate for the line's increasing traffic. In 1882 it was reported that the station platform would be 'removed to the lower side of the track' and land taken from the harbour endowment of Mt Eliot. Indeed, there were tenders for additions to the station as early as 7 September 1875, and again in 1889 (extra land for the station), 1891, 1892 (building a mail room) and 1898 (enlargement of New Plymouth Station). By the 1890s, the station included a passenger platform and building, a goods shed, an engine shed, and other amenities typical of a principal provincial station.

In 1884, the new Breakwater harbour opened at New Plymouth, and a short extension of the line connected the station to the port, reducing the reliance on Waitara’s port. This allowed for the through running of the New Plymouth Express trains from Wellington through New Plymouth to the overnight steam ship service to Auckland. The rails were linked from 14 December 1885 and the official opening of the Moturoa Railway to Breakwater was on 24 May 1886, though the 1 mi 70 ch (3.0 km) line was taken over from the contractors on 30 April 1886 and opened on Monday, 10 May.

Eventually, the station building was relocated to the foot of Currie Street to be used as a goods office, a role it continued to play until 1954.

== Troup Vintage station (1902) ==
New Plymouth railway yards in 1950

In 1902, New Plymouth received an impressive new railway station. Extra tracks and yard space (including a dock platform on the breakwater end) were built, and a grand station building was constructed, complete with an ornate clock tower or dome. This Edwardian-style structure was designed by the Railways Department’s architect (George Troup). It was similar to other Troup-era stations with decorative features, including Marseilles roof tiles, eave bracketing, a generous platform verandah (a must with New Plymouth's changeable weather) and decorative street porches. The replacement station opened on 17 October 1902 and was part of a project that also included new sidings, a larger goods shed, seawall construction, relocating engine sheds to Morley Street and culverting of the Huatoki Stream. In total, about £25,420 was invested in the rail facilities.

Not long after the station was rebuilt, the problematic rail alignment through downtown was also addressed. Spurred by fatal accidents at street crossings in 1901, the government approved a deviation of the line to bypass the central city street as well as a greatly expanded railway yard on reclaimed foreshore land (including using soil from Puke Ariki / Mt Eliot which was completely removed).

The new route, constructed in 1906–07, ran along the coastal edge of the town (behind Woolcombe Terrace and along the seafront) and eliminated the level crossings by using bridges. The deviation opened on 16 December 1907, quietly and without fanfare – in fact, some unknowing passengers waited at Elliot Street station (on the old line) that morning and missed their train when service had already shifted to the new coastal line.

The Edwardian station handled significant passenger traffic in its heyday. In 1925 services included the New Plymouth express and three local mixed services in each direction. In 1926 a new passenger service, the Taranaki Flyer, started between New Plymouth and Wanganui. Auckland services followed in 1933 when the New Plymouth Night Express service began operating.

The station’s clock, however, had a short life – in 1916 it was reported to be showing the wrong time and in September 1916 it was removed to the station building after only 13 years.

By the late 1940s, railway officials had long been concerned about the room for expansion at New Plymouth. In June 1947 the Taranaki Daily News reported that a report by the Railways Department's district engineer at Wanganui, H. G. Stevens, had raised the possibility of reclaiming the bay opposite the station. The idea had not progressed beyond preliminary consideration, and the general manager of railways, J. Sawers, declined to discuss it, saying the work was too far in the future. The report also identified moving the goods shed to the western side of the station as the more pressing need. In January 1949 the district traffic manager, A. E. List, announced that an automatic telephone exchange for internal railway use would be installed at the station.

In January 1950, departmental officials in Wellington considered two schemes to improve the station, particularly the booking office. One was a short-term measure to relieve the existing position, the other a more comprehensive general improvement. An extension to the goods shed had also been authorised. A further article a week later described the conditions inside the building. The stationmaster's office measured 18 by 9 feet and was shared with a clerk and a typist, the booking office was crowded, and noise from shunting engines and passing trains made telephone use difficult. Railway staff were reported as considering that the station had long outlived its usefulness.

In October 1953 the Railways Department's senior architect, I. M. Clarkson, announced new colour schemes for the New Plymouth, Hāwera and Stratford stations, to be applied in time for the Royal visit in January 1954. They were intended to replace the uniform orange and chocolate brown then common on railway buildings. At New Plymouth the walls facing the street were to be silver grey and those facing the sea "jonquil, a pale yellow", with the door colours reversed on each side. The steelwork under the verandah was to be blue, the corrugated iron sections red, and the tiled roofing cleaned. White window sashes were the only feature common to all three stations.

The station building lasted until 1961, when it was again replaced. One notable memento saved was the station bell – the bell (reportedly originally from the ship SS Edina) was removed from the old building and donated to Welbourn Primary School in late 1961. Welbourn was a railway suburb, with many railway workers and their families living in the area.

== Post-war station (1961) ==
In 1961, New Plymouth’s railway station was completely rebuilt for a third time. The Railways Department constructed a replacement station building on roughly the same site, opening it to the public on 12 December 1961. The new station was approximately 150 feet in length, with a two-storey section at the eastern end. Its design was functional and modern, reflecting 1960s architectural trends rather than the ornamentation of its predecessor. This was part of the larger post-war modernisation of railway infrastructure across the country.

Unlike other post-war NZR stations, New Plymouth didn't have space for road service bus services, which departed from a separate depot in the city. The station did feature improved passenger amenities, a ticket office, waiting rooms, and railway operations offices in its two-story section. A modern signal box was built alongside the eastern end of the station.

Passenger services began to decline around this time:

- The Taranaki Flyer service to Wanganui had already ended on 7 February 1959.
- The night service to Auckland was next, being shortened to run to Taumaranui only in 1971, before changing to a more sociable daytime service in 1973.
- Wellington services were next to cease. The evening railcar was the first to stop in the early 1970s before the final Blue Streak railcar daytime service ran on 30 July 1977, replaced by buses.
- Finally, the daytime New Plymouth - Taumaranui service ended in January 1983.

By contrast, freight services continued to be busy. By the 1970s, New Plymouth station had outgrown the space available. During the 1980s, a new freight yard & locomotive depot were constructed at Smart Road. Services gradually moved to the new site during the decade, with the official opening on 4 September 1989. The city railway yards (already reduced in size) closed that same day.

== Closure ==
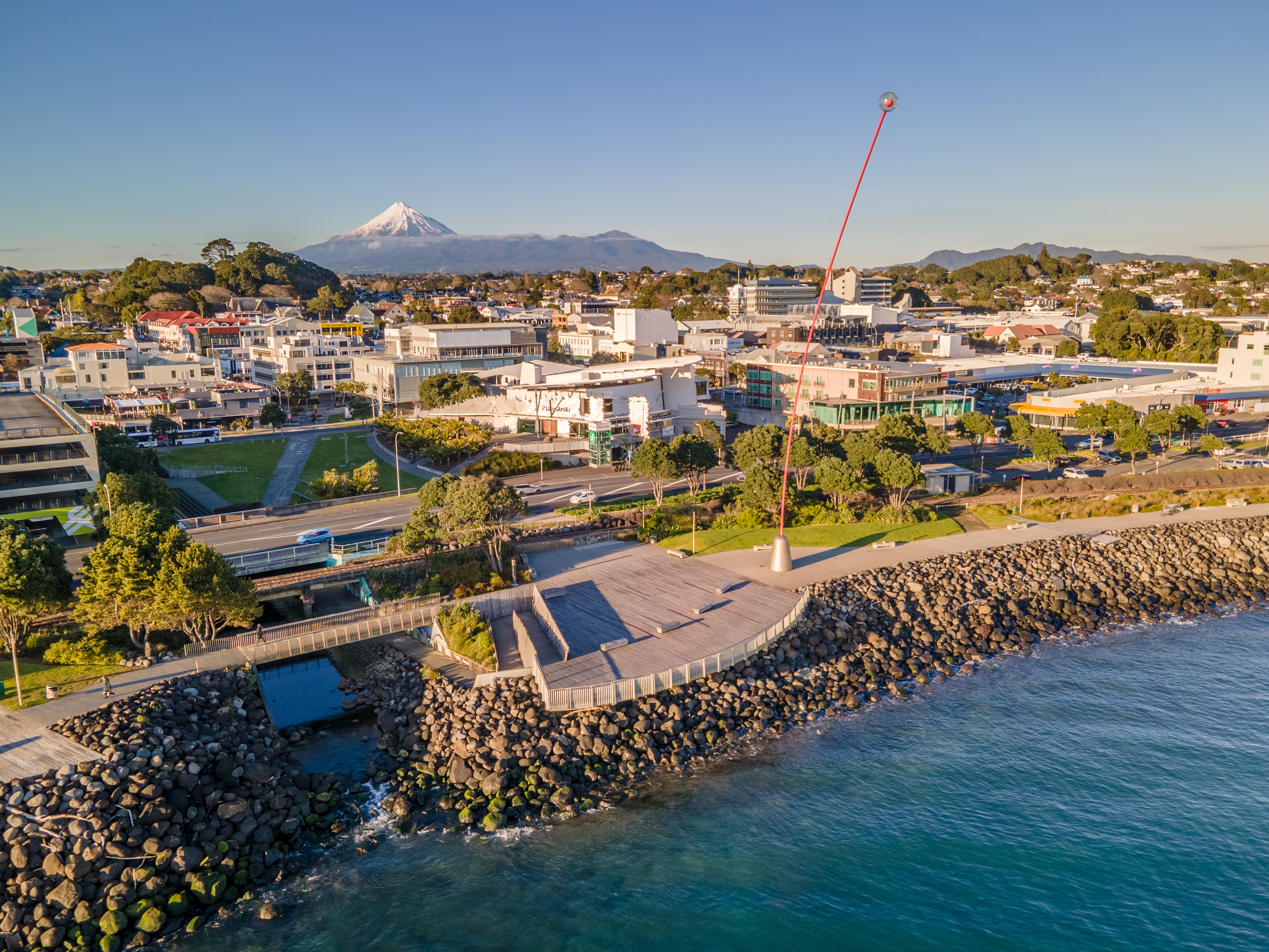
Former New Plymouth railway yards in 2020. The station building site was on the far right of the image.

In June 1989, a series of farewell excursion trains were run from New Plymouth station prior to the stations final closure. On 4 September 1989 final track removal began, starting with the track in front of the station building. The site was cleared, other than a single main track through the site, and was turned into the Tasman Prospect recreational area.

The station building was retained for a few more years, as Intercity Coachlines (the successor to the Railways Road Service) had moved to the station during the 1980s and had yet to relocate. It was finally demolished (along with the footbridge) in the mid-1990s in preparation for the redevelopment of the New Plymouth waterfront (including the Wind Wand millennium project), coastal walkway and Puke Ariki complex.
