= Lynmouth, New Zealand =

Suburb of New Plymouth, New Zealand

Lynmouth
- Suburb
- Interactive map of Lynmouth
- Coordinates: 39°3′52″S 174°3′14″E
- Country: New Zealand
- City: New Plymouth
- Local authority: New Plymouth District Council
- Electoral ward: Kaitake-Ngāmotu General Ward; Te Purutanga Mauri Pūmanawa Māori Ward

Area
  - Land: 116 ha (290 acres)

Population (June 2025)
  - Total: 2,700
  - Density: 2,300/km^{2} (6,000/sq mi)

	(North Taranaki Bight)
Moturoa	Lynmouth	New Plymouth centre
Marfell	Westown	Frankleigh Park

Lynmouth is a suburb of New Plymouth in the Taranaki Region of New Zealand. It is located to the west of the city centre.

Taranaki Base Hospital is between Lynmouth and Westown to the south.

== Street Names ==
Several streets in the suburb have names from Richard Blackmore's novel Lorna Doone, including characters (Lorna St, Doone St, Carver St, Ridd St), locations across the West Country of the UK (Taunton Pl, Truro St, Lyn St) and the Author himself (Blackmore St).

This continues the general West Country naming theme which extends from the English name of the city (New Plymouth) and other streets (such as Weymouth St, Plympton St, Dorset Ave, and the main thoroughfare Devon St).

== Demographics ==
Blagdon-Lynmouth statistical area covers 1.16 km^{2} (0.45 sq mi) and had an estimated population of 2,700 as of June 2025, with a population density of 2,328 people per km^{2}.

Historical population
Year	Pop.	±% p.a.
2006	2,415	—
2013	2,397	−0.11%
2018	2,523	+1.03%
2023	2,598	+0.59%

Blagdon-Lynmouth had a population of 2,598 in the 2023 New Zealand census, an increase of 75 people (3.0%) since the 2018 census, and an increase of 201 people (8.4%) since the 2013 census. There were 1,278 males, 1,305 females, and 15 people of other genders in 981 dwellings. 3.8% of people identified as LGBTIQ+. The median age was 35.3 years (compared with 38.1 years nationally). There were 540 people (20.8%) aged under 15 years, 519 (20.0%) aged 15 to 29, 1,173 (45.2%) aged 30 to 64, and 363 (14.0%) aged 65 or older.

People could identify as more than one ethnicity. The results were 79.1% European (Pākehā); 23.7% Māori; 3.9% Pasifika; 10.0% Asian; 0.3% Middle Eastern, Latin American and African New Zealanders (MELAA); and 2.2% other, which includes people giving their ethnicity as "New Zealander". English was spoken by 97.1%, Māori by 4.0%, Samoan by 0.3%, and other languages by 9.0%. No language could be spoken by 2.3% (e.g. too young to talk). New Zealand Sign Language was known by 0.3%. The percentage of people born overseas was 17.6, compared with 28.8% nationally.

Religious affiliations were 29.4% Christian, 1.3% Hindu, 0.7% Islam, 0.6% Māori religious beliefs, 0.8% Buddhist, 0.7% New Age, and 1.4% other religions. People who answered that they had no religion were 57.6%, and 7.5% of people did not answer the census question.

Of those at least 15 years old, 417 (20.3%) people had a bachelor's or higher degree, 1,194 (58.0%) had a post-high school certificate or diploma, and 444 (21.6%) people exclusively held high school qualifications. The median income was $40,400, compared with $41,500 nationally. 171 people (8.3%) earned over $100,000 compared to 12.1% nationally. The employment status of those at least 15 was 1,065 (51.7%) full-time, 324 (15.7%) part-time, and 60 (2.9%) unemployed.

== Education ==
Devon Intermediate is an intermediate (years 7-8) school with a roll of 335 (July 2025). The school was established in 1958.

West End Te Kura Ō Mōrere and St Joseph's School are contributing primary (years 1-6) schools with rolls of 253 and 287 respectively (July 2025). West End Te Kura Ō Mōrere opened in 1884 and moved to its current location in 1926. St Joseph's is a state integrated Catholic school. It opened in 1926.

All these schools are coeducational.

== Sports ==
FC Western are an association football club based at Lynmouth Park, Devon Street West.
