= Hurdon =

Suburb of New Plymouth, New Zealand

- Suburb
- Interactive map of Hurdon
- Coordinates: 39°5′13″S 174°3′8″E
- Country: New Zealand
- City: New Plymouth
- Local authority: New Plymouth District Council
- Electoral ward: Kaitake-Ngāmotu General Ward; Te Purutanga Mauri Pūmanawa Māori Ward

Area
  - Land: 520 ha (1,300 acres)

Population (June 2025)
  - Total: 2,670
  - Density: 510/km^{2} (1,300/sq mi)

Marfell	Westown	Frankleigh Park
Whalers Gate	Hurdon	Ferndale

Hurdon is a suburb of New Plymouth, in the western North Island of New Zealand. It is located to the southwest of the city centre.

An early settler of the area was Peter Elliot, who arrived on the Amelia Thompson in 1841. He established the first dairy in New Plymouth, which he called Hurdon. A school was established in his barn in 1853.

== Demographics ==
Hurdon covers 5.20 km^{2} (2.01 sq mi) and had an estimated population of 2,670 as of June 2025, with a population density of 708 people per km^{2}.

Historical population
Year	Pop.	±% p.a.
2006	1,851	—
2013	2,127	+2.01%
2018	2,265	+1.27%
2023	2,559	+2.47%
The 2006 population is for a smaller area of 3.77 km^{2}. Source:

Hurdon had a population of 2,559 in the 2023 New Zealand census, an increase of 294 people (13.0%) since the 2018 census, and an increase of 432 people (20.3%) since the 2013 census. There were 1,242 males, 1,311 females, and 6 people of other genders in 966 dwellings. 2.7% of people identified as LGBTIQ+. The median age was 40.9 years (compared with 38.1 years nationally). There were 507 people (19.8%) aged under 15 years, 402 (15.7%) aged 15 to 29, 1,173 (45.8%) aged 30 to 64, and 477 (18.6%) aged 65 or older.

People could identify as more than one ethnicity. The results were 86.6% European (Pākehā); 13.8% Māori; 1.9% Pasifika; 6.7% Asian; 1.9% Middle Eastern, Latin American and African New Zealanders (MELAA); and 2.3% other, which includes people giving their ethnicity as "New Zealander". English was spoken by 97.9%, Māori by 2.1%, Samoan by 0.2%, and other languages by 10.0%. No language could be spoken by 1.9% (e.g. too young to talk). New Zealand Sign Language was known by 0.5%. The percentage of people born overseas was 21.9, compared with 28.8% nationally.

Religious affiliations were 36.3% Christian, 1.6% Hindu, 0.6% Islam, 0.4% Māori religious beliefs, 0.2% Buddhist, 0.1% New Age, 0.2% Jewish, and 1.3% other religions. People who answered that they had no religion were 51.5%, and 7.6% of people did not answer the census question.

Of those at least 15 years old, 513 (25.0%) people had a bachelor's or higher degree, 1,140 (55.6%) had a post-high school certificate or diploma, and 399 (19.4%) people exclusively held high school qualifications. The median income was $42,200, compared with $41,500 nationally. 237 people (11.5%) earned over $100,000 compared to 12.1% nationally. The employment status of those at least 15 was 1,041 (50.7%) full-time, 291 (14.2%) part-time, and 48 (2.3%) unemployed.

== Education ==
Frankley School is a coeducational contributing primary (years 1-6) school with a roll of 294 students as of July 2025. The school started as Frankley Road School in 1878. A new two-room school replaced it in 1910. The school moved to its current site in 1969.
