= Taranaki District Health Board =

District health board of New Zealand

- Location of the Taranaki DHB (green) in New Zealand
- Abbreviation: TDHB
- Formation: 1 January 2001; 25 years ago
- Founder: New Zealand Government
- Dissolved: 1 July 2022; 4 years ago
- Legal status: Active
- Purpose: DHB
- Services: Health and disability services
- Parent organization: Ministry of Health
- Website: www.tdhb.org.nz

The Taranaki District Health Board (Taranaki DHB or TDHB) was a district health board which provided healthcare to the Taranaki region of New Zealand. In July 2022, the Taranaki DHB was merged into the national health service Te Whatu Ora (Health New Zealand).

== History ==
The Taranaki District Health Board, like most other district health boards, came into effect on 1 January 2001 established by the New Zealand Public Health and Disability Act 2000.

== Geographic area ==
The area covered by the Taranaki District Health Board is defined in Schedule 1 of the New Zealand Public Health and Disability Act 2000 and based on territorial authority and ward boundaries as constituted as at 1 January 2001. The area can be adjusted through an Order in Council.

== Governance ==
The initial board was fully appointed. Since the 2001 local elections, the board has been partially elected (seven members) and in addition, up to four members get appointed by the Minister of Health. The minister also appoints the chairperson and deputy-chair from the pool of eleven board members.

On 1 July 2022, the Taranaki DHB and the other district health boards were disestablished, with Te Whatu Ora (Health New Zealand) assuming their former functions and operations including hospitals and health services. The Taranaki DHB was brought under Te Whatu Ora's Te Manawa Taki division.

== Demographics ==
Historical population
Year	Pop.	±% p.a.
2006	104,277	—
2013	109,752	+0.73%
2018	117,684	+1.41%

Taranaki DHB served a population of 117,684 at the 2018 New Zealand census, an increase of 7,932 people (7.2%) since the 2013 census, and an increase of 13,407 people (12.9%) since the 2006 census. There were 45,306 households. There were 58,323 males and 59,364 females, giving a sex ratio of 0.98 males per female. The median age was 40.0 years (compared with 37.4 years nationally), with 24,684 people (21.0%) aged under 15 years, 20,004 (17.0%) aged 15 to 29, 52,542 (44.6%) aged 30 to 64, and 20,454 (17.4%) aged 65 or older.

Ethnicities were 84.8% European/Pākehā, 19.8% Māori, 2.1% Pacific peoples, 4.5% Asian, and 2.0% other ethnicities. People may identify with more than one ethnicity.

The percentage of people born overseas was 13.6, compared with 27.1% nationally.

Although some people objected to giving their religion, 51.8% had no religion, 36.0% were Christian, 0.8% were Hindu, 0.5% were Muslim, 0.4% were Buddhist and 2.5% had other religions.

Of those at least 15 years old, 13,785 (14.8%) people had a bachelor or higher degree, and 21,726 (23.4%) people had no formal qualifications. The median income was $29,900, compared with $31,800 nationally. 14,286 people (15.4%) earned over $70,000 compared to 17.2% nationally. The employment status of those at least 15 was that 44,736 (48.1%) people were employed full-time, 14,157 (15.2%) were part-time, and 3,684 (4.0%) were unemployed.

== Hospitals ==
=== Public hospitals ===
- Taranaki Base Hospital (39.071906°S 174.056710°E) in Westown in New Plymouth has 194 beds and provides surgical, medical, mental health, children's health and maternity services.
- Hawera Hospital (39.587728°S 174.266703°E) in Hāwera, South Taranaki District has 14 beds and provides maternity and medical services.

=== Private hospitals ===
- Southern Cross Hospital New Plymouth (39.0586923°S 174.0638001°E) in New Plymouth Central in New Plymouth has 24 beds and provides surgical and medical services.
- Te Rangimarie Hospice (39.073619°S 174.058206°E) in Westown in New Plymouth has six beds and provides medical services.
