= Brooklands, New Plymouth =

Brooklands
- Suburb
- Interactive map of Brooklands
- Coordinates: 39.07°S 174.08°E
- Country: New Zealand
- City: New Plymouth

Vogeltown	Welbourn
Vogeltown	Brooklands	Highlands Park
	farmland

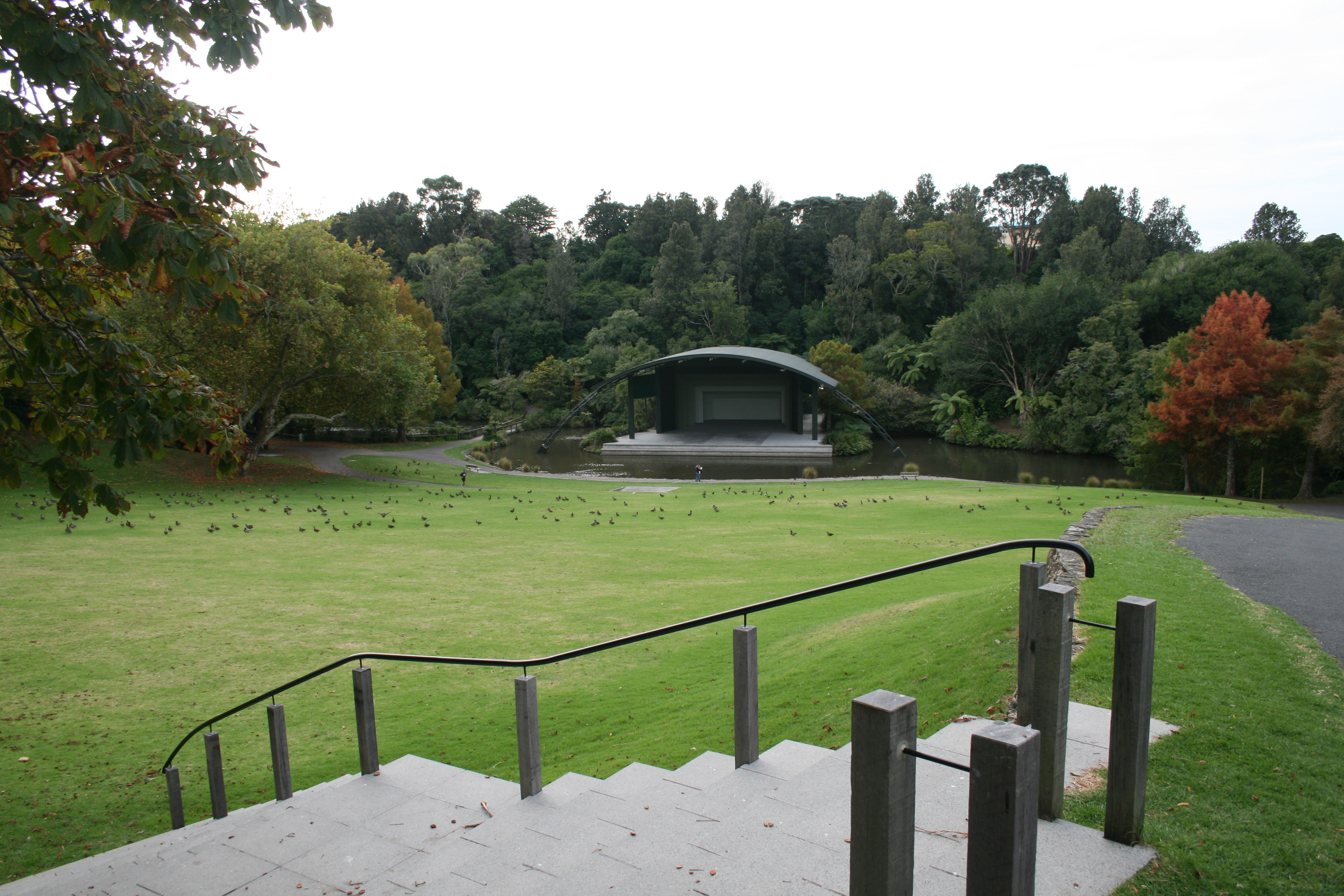
The Bowl of Brooklands

Brooklands is a suburb of New Plymouth, in the Taranaki region of the western North Island of New Zealand. It is located on the southern edge of the city and east of Vogeltown. The area is named after Brooklands farm, established in 1842.

== Features ==
A large part of Brooklands is parkland, with Brooklands Park adjoining the New Plymouth racecourse and Pukekura Park. In 1957, its natural amphitheatre and lake were converted into the Bowl of Brooklands, recognised as one of New Zealand's finest outdoor concert venues. The Bowl plays host to many international acts and is the venue for the New Zealand edition of the WOMAD festival.

The park includes a children's zoo, opened in 1965 and operated by the District Council. The Gables, a colonial hospital building, which was completed in 1848, on the orders of Governor Sir George Grey, to provide medical care for Māori and Pākēha was moved to the Brooklands estate in 1904. It is a Category 1 listed Historic Place and is New Zealand's oldest surviving hospital building, and functions as a gallery for the Taranaki Arts Society.

The world's only Lawn Bowls Museum is located in Brooklands. It was established in 1980 and has more than 8000 exhibits.

A zoo is located in the suburb, the Brooklands Zoo which includes: monkeys, meerkats, otters, agoutis, capybara, owls, brolgas, tortoises, lizards, frogs, newts and other animals.

New Plymouth's main electricity distribution substation is in the Brooklands area.

== History ==
Captain Henry King established Brooklands farm in 1842, as a model farm for the New Zealand Company, promoters of the New Plymouth settlement. The farmhouse was razed by fire near the end of the First Taranaki War in March 1861, but its chimney still stands in Brooklands park today. Between 1875 and 1880 there was an unsuccessful attempt to establish a vineyard in part of the Pukekura stream valley An area of 53 acres (21.5 hectares) became the property of prominent Taranaki businessman Newton King, and a mansion named Brooklands was built there in the first decade of the 20th century. When King died in 1927, he left £10,000 to the New Plymouth parks and reserves board. However, due to some failed business ventures prior to his death, the money was unavailable, and in 1934 the trustees of his estate gifted the property to the New Plymouth borough instead. Unable to find a use for the house, it was demolished in 1936. The suburb expanded south to its current limits in the 1950s.

== Education ==
- St Pius X School is a coeducational contributing primary (years 1–6) school with a roll of 129 St Pius X is a state integrated Catholic school. and has a decile rating of 8.
- Highlands Intermediate School is a coeducational intermediate (years 7–8) school with a roll of 684. It has a decile rating of 7 and was founded in 1955. Facilities include a hockey turf. The uniform consists of a polo shirt, sweatshirt and then for girls a choice of culottes or a skirt and boys wear shorts.

== Gallery ==
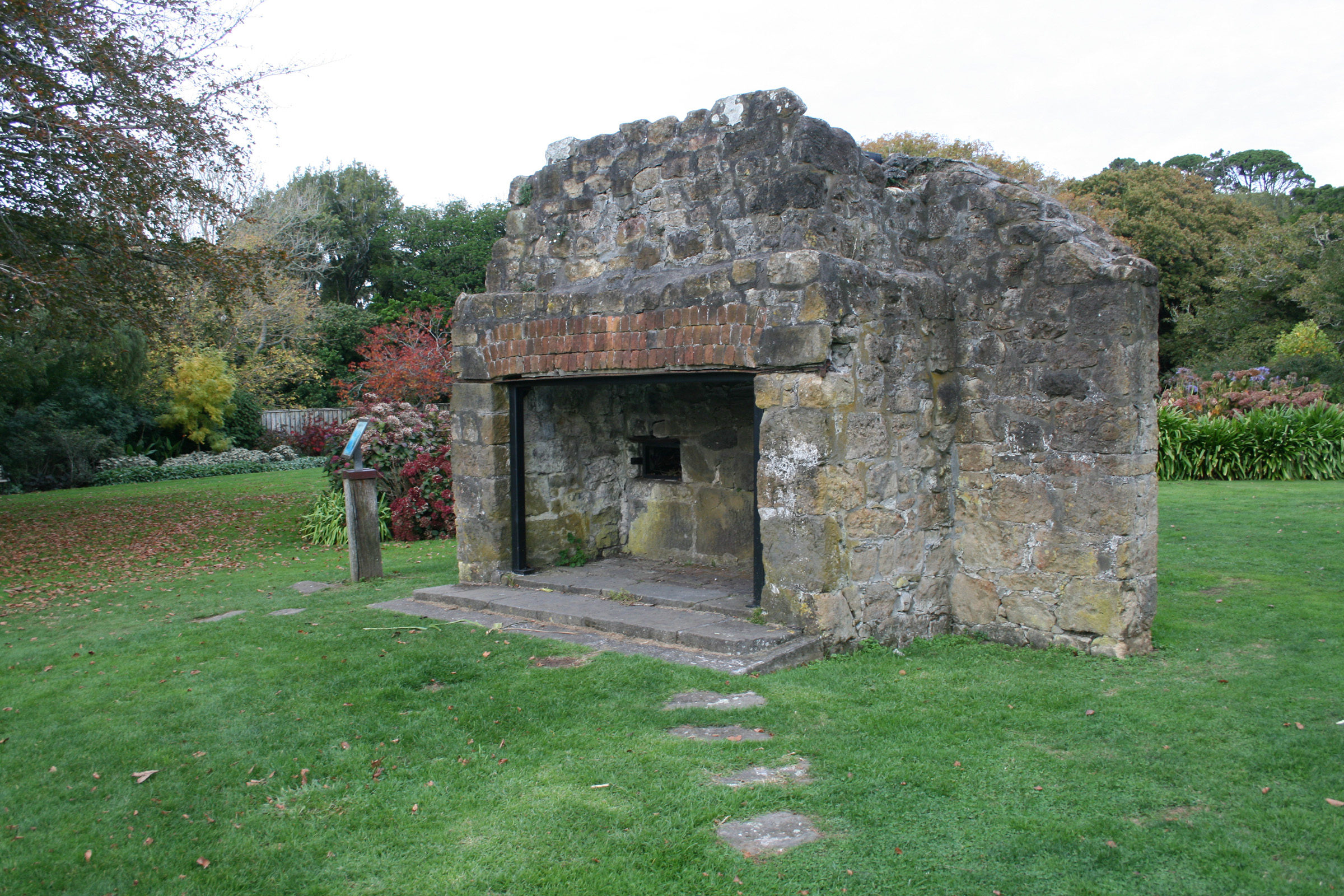
The chimney of Henry King's 1842 farmhouse.

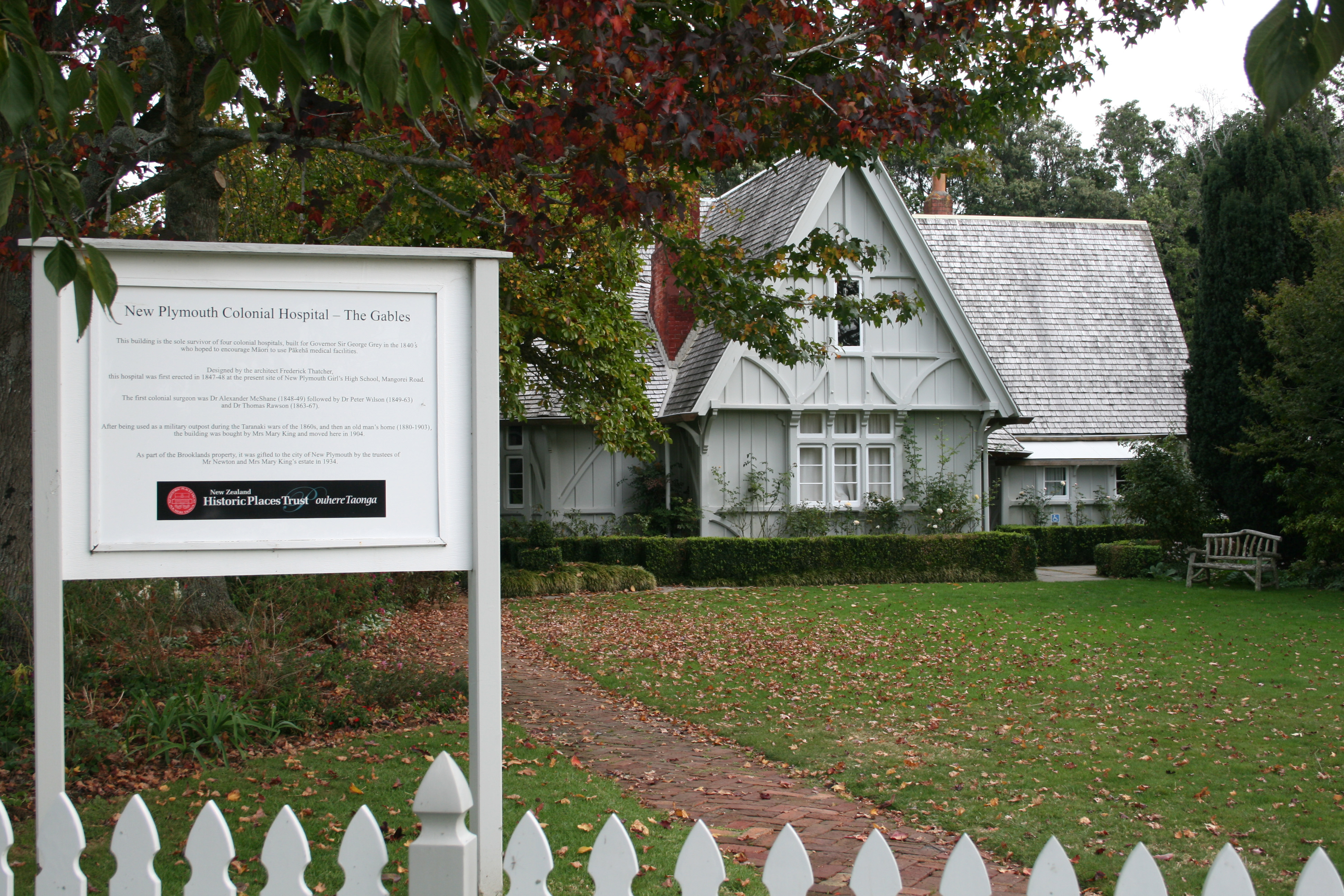
The Gables

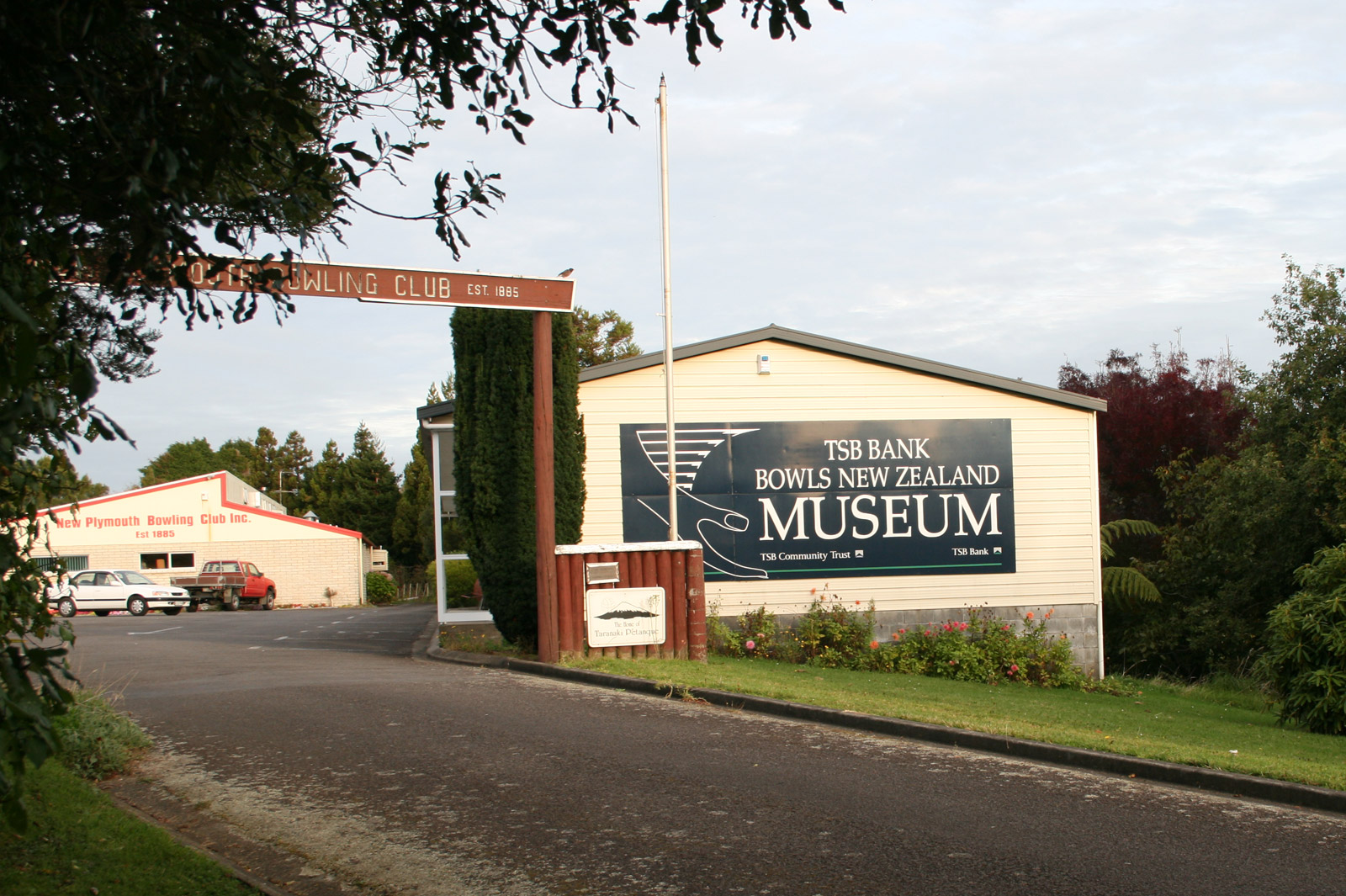
The New Zealand Bowls Museum is located at the New Plymouth Bowling club.
