= New Plymouth Central =

Central business district of New Plymouth, New Zealand

- Suburb
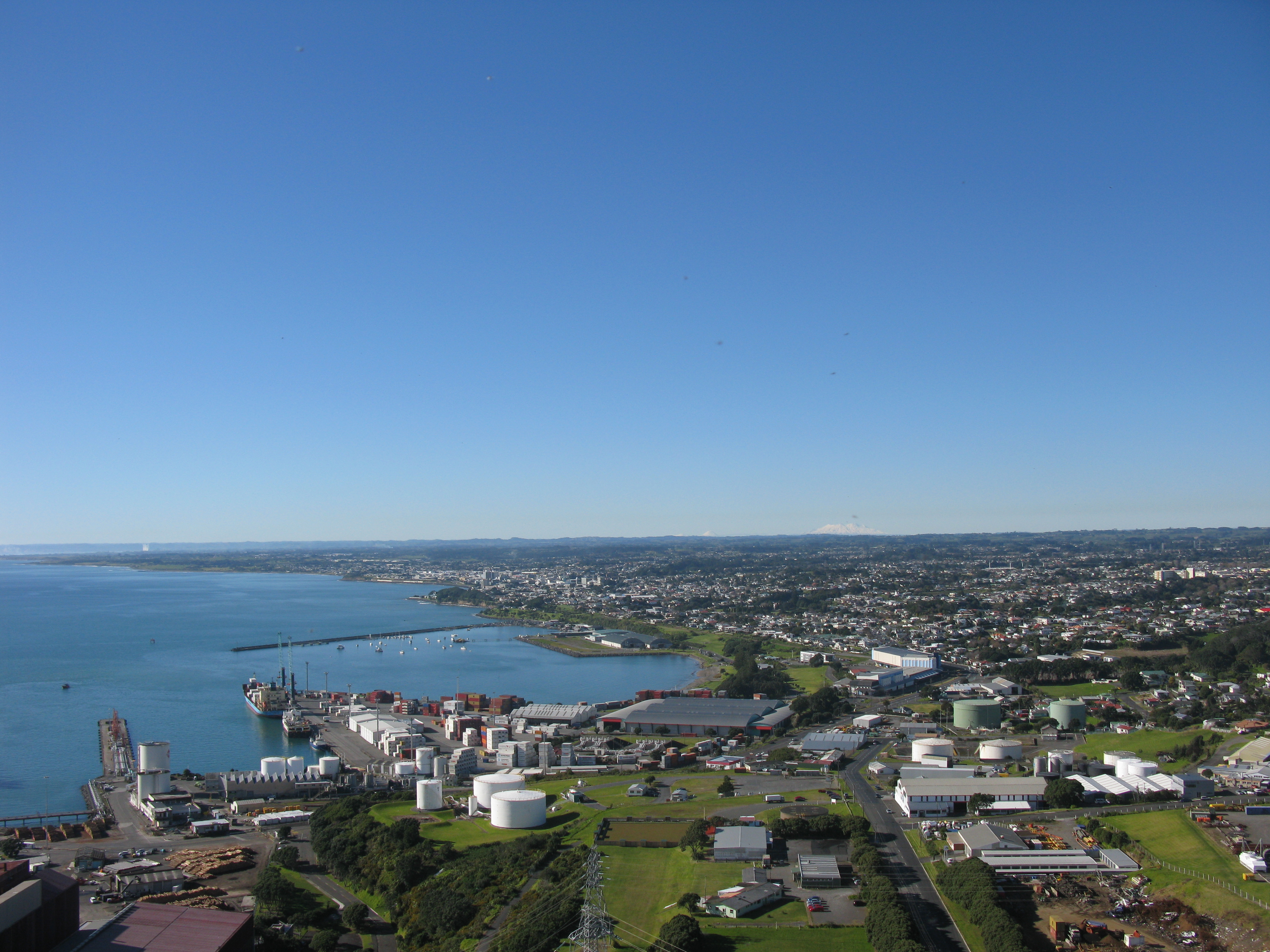
- Interactive map of New Plymouth Central
- Coordinates: 39.059°S 174.072°E
- Country: New Zealand
- City: New Plymouth
- Local authority: New Plymouth District Council
- Electoral ward: Kaitake-Ngāmotu General Ward; Te Purutanga Mauri Pūmanawa Māori Ward

Area
  - Land: 126 ha (310 acres)

Population (June 2025)
  - Total: 1,250
  - Density: 992/km^{2} (2,570/sq mi)

| | (North Taranaki Bight) |
| Moturoa | New Plymouth Central | East End |
| Lynmouth, Westown | Welbourn, Vogeltown | Merrilands |

New Plymouth Central is the central business district and central suburb of New Plymouth, in the Taranaki region of the western North Island of New Zealand.

== Demographics ==
New Plymouth Central covers 1.26 km^{2} (0.49 sq mi) and had an estimated population of 1,250 as of June 2025, with a population density of 992 people per km^{2}.

Historical population
| Year | Pop. | ±% p.a. |
|---|---|---|
| 2006 | 1,152 | — |
| 2013 | 1,152 | +0.00% |
| 2018 | 1,110 | −0.74% |
| 2023 | 1,140 | +0.53% |

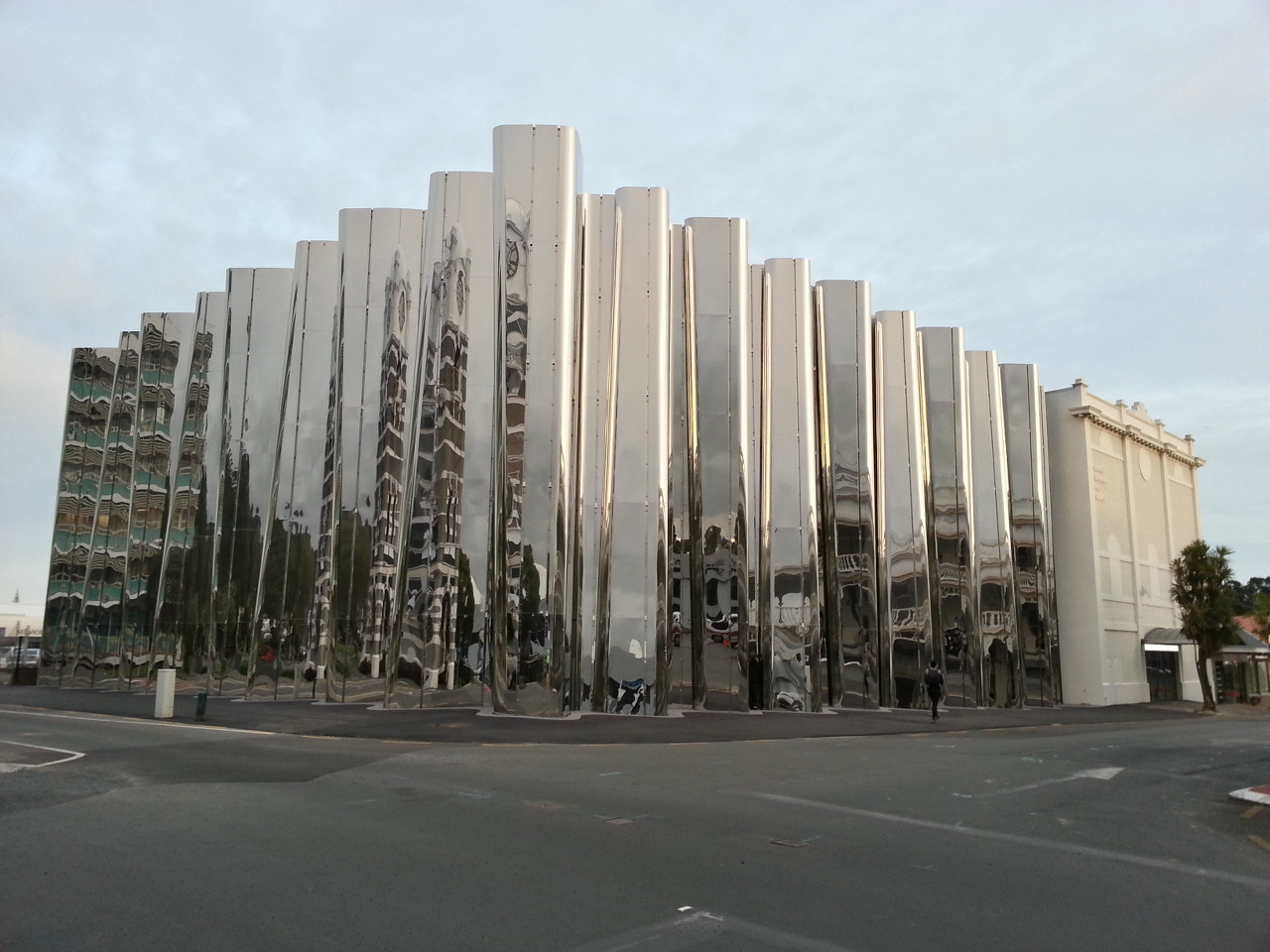
The Len Lye Centre

New Plymouth Central had a population of 1,140 in the 2023 New Zealand census, an increase of 30 people (2.7%) since the 2018 census, and a decrease of 12 people (−1.0%) since the 2013 census. There were 552 males, 582 females, and 6 people of other genders in 582 dwellings. 5.5% of people identified as LGBTIQ+. The median age was 44.2 years (compared with 38.1 years nationally). There were 144 people (12.6%) aged under 15 years, 192 (16.8%) aged 15 to 29, 537 (47.1%) aged 30 to 64, and 270 (23.7%) aged 65 or older.

People could identify as more than one ethnicity. The results were 77.4% European (Pākehā); 17.6% Māori; 1.8% Pasifika; 14.2% Asian; 1.3% Middle Eastern, Latin American and African New Zealanders (MELAA); and 3.9% other, which includes people giving their ethnicity as "New Zealander". English was spoken by 96.3%, Māori by 3.2%, Samoan by 0.3%, and other languages by 11.6%. No language could be spoken by 2.6% (e.g. too young to talk). New Zealand Sign Language was known by 0.3%. The percentage of people born overseas was 23.9, compared with 28.8% nationally.

Religious affiliations were 31.6% Christian, 3.4% Hindu, 1.1% Islam, 0.3% Māori religious beliefs, 1.1% Buddhist, 0.8% New Age, and 1.6% other religions. People who answered that they had no religion were 53.9%, and 6.1% of people did not answer the census question.

Of those at least 15 years old, 228 (22.9%) people had a bachelor's or higher degree, 498 (50.0%) had a post-high school certificate or diploma, and 270 (27.1%) people exclusively held high school qualifications. The median income was $38,800, compared with $41,500 nationally. 108 people (10.8%) earned over $100,000 compared to 12.1% nationally. The employment status of those at least 15 was 450 (45.2%) full-time, 144 (14.5%) part-time, and 39 (3.9%) unemployed.

== Economy ==
=== Retail ===
Centre City shopping centre opened in New Plymouth Central on 19 October 1988. It covers an area of 4,530 m², with 125 shops including Farmers. It has 700 carparks.
