= Westown =

Suburb of New Plymouth, New Zealand

- Suburb
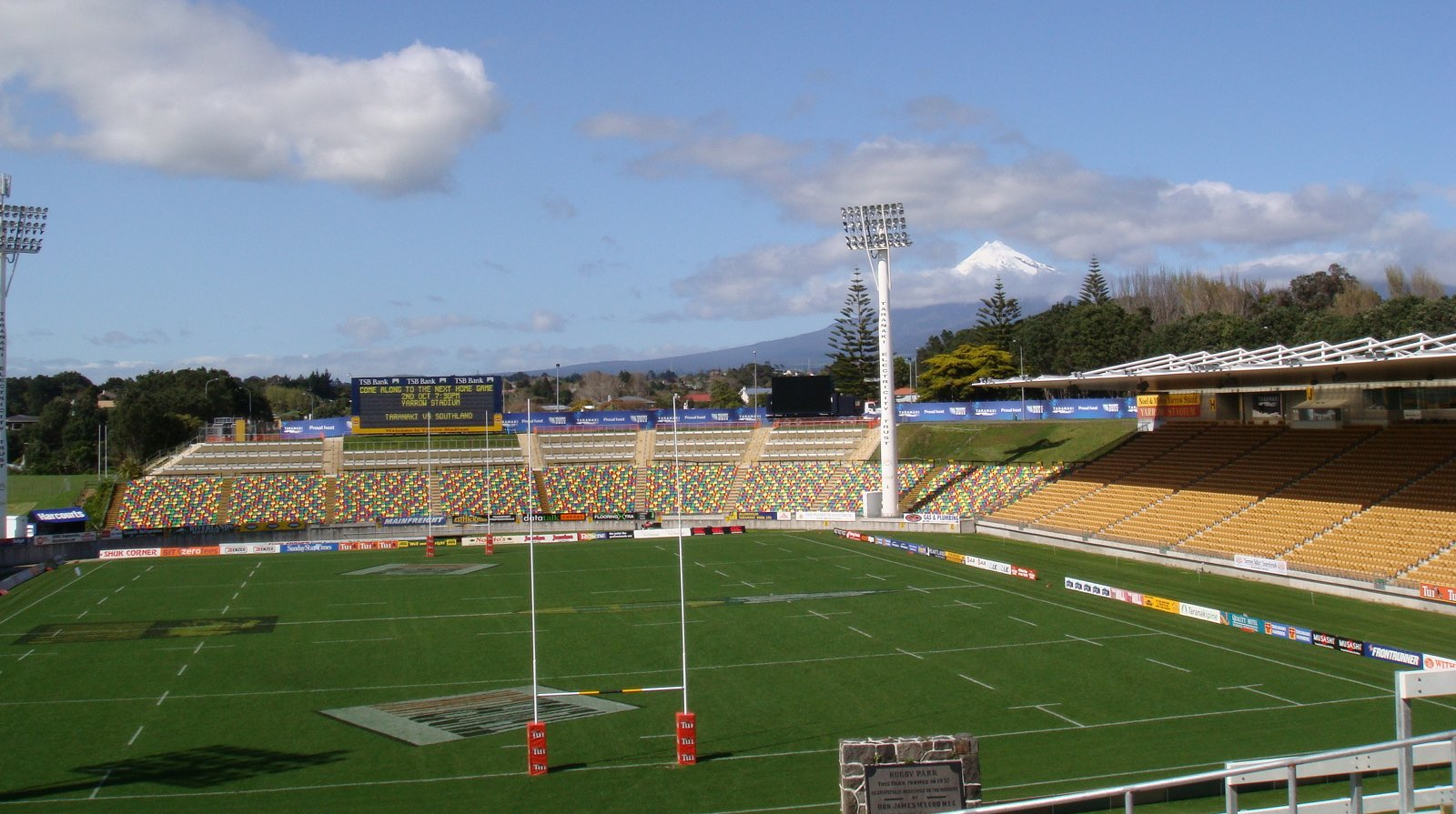
- Yarrow Stadium
- Interactive map of Westown
- Coordinates: 39°4′30″S 174°3′26″E
- Country: New Zealand
- City: New Plymouth
- Local authority: New Plymouth District Council
- Electoral ward: Kaitake-Ngāmotu General Ward; Te Purutanga Mauri Pūmanawa Māori Ward

Area
  - Land: 237 ha (590 acres)

Population (June 2025)
  - Total: 4,880
  - Density: 2,060/km^{2} (5,330/sq mi)
- Hospitals: Taranaki Base Hospital

	Lynmouth	New Plymouth Central
Marfell	Westown	Vogeltown
Whalers Gate	Hurdon	Frankleigh Park

Westown is a suburb of New Plymouth, in the western North Island of New Zealand. It is located to the southwest of the city centre and west of Frankleigh Park.

Taranaki Base Hospital lies between Westown and Lynmouth. Yarrow Stadium is a rugby union ground in Westown.

== Demographics ==
Westown covers 2.37 km^{2} (0.92 sq mi) and had an estimated population of 4,880 as of June 2025, with a population density of 2,059 people per km^{2}.

Historical population
Year	Pop.	±% p.a.
2006	4,227	—
2013	4,266	+0.13%
2018	4,404	+0.64%
2023	4,683	+1.24%

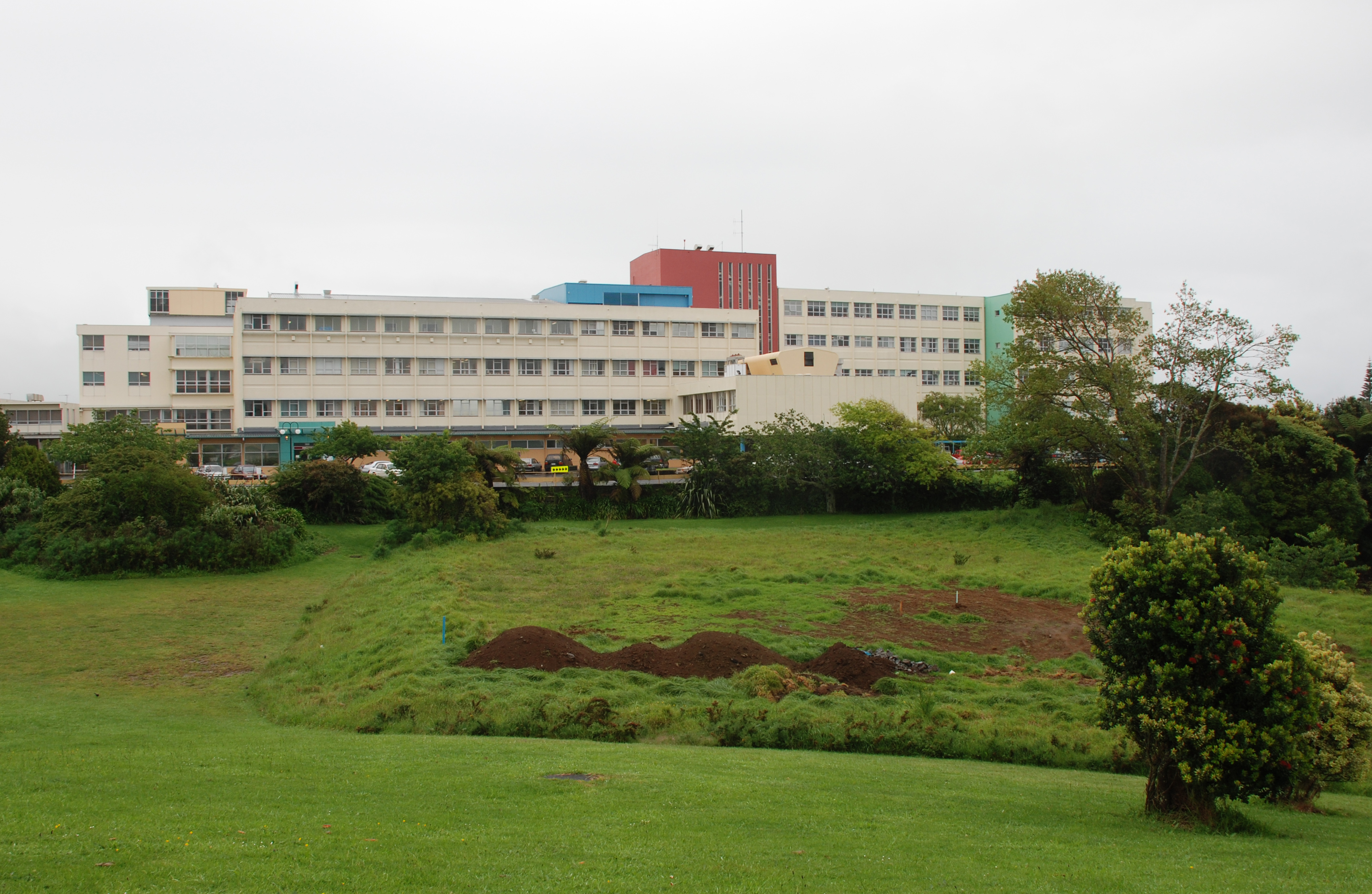
Taranaki Base Hospital

Westown had a population of 4,683 in the 2023 New Zealand census, an increase of 279 people (6.3%) since the 2018 census, and an increase of 417 people (9.8%) since the 2013 census. There were 2,226 males, 2,433 females, and 24 people of other genders in 1,863 dwellings. 3.4% of people identified as LGBTIQ+. The median age was 38.0 years (compared with 38.1 years nationally). There were 927 people (19.8%) aged under 15 years, 825 (17.6%) aged 15 to 29, 1,947 (41.6%) aged 30 to 64, and 987 (21.1%) aged 65 or older.

People could identify as more than one ethnicity. The results were 77.6% European (Pākehā); 23.0% Māori; 3.4% Pasifika; 10.5% Asian; 0.6% Middle Eastern, Latin American and African New Zealanders (MELAA); and 2.0% other, which includes people giving their ethnicity as "New Zealander". English was spoken by 96.6%, Māori by 5.5%, Samoan by 0.4%, and other languages by 9.0%. No language could be spoken by 2.4% (e.g. too young to talk). New Zealand Sign Language was known by 0.4%. The percentage of people born overseas was 17.9, compared with 28.8% nationally.

Religious affiliations were 34.4% Christian, 1.7% Hindu, 0.8% Islam, 1.2% Māori religious beliefs, 0.4% Buddhist, 0.6% New Age, 0.1% Jewish, and 1.4% other religions. People who answered that they had no religion were 50.5%, and 8.8% of people did not answer the census question.

Of those at least 15 years old, 699 (18.6%) people had a bachelor's or higher degree, 2,046 (54.5%) had a post-high school certificate or diploma, and 1,008 (26.8%) people exclusively held high school qualifications. The median income was $35,400, compared with $41,500 nationally. 267 people (7.1%) earned over $100,000 compared to 12.1% nationally. The employment status of those at least 15 was 1,695 (45.1%) full-time, 546 (14.5%) part-time, and 114 (3.0%) unemployed.

== Education ==
Francis Douglas Memorial College is a boys' secondary (years 7-13) school with a roll of 799 students as of March 2026. It is a state-integrated Catholic school, founded in 1959.

Westown School is a coeducational contributing primary (years 1-6) school with a roll of 157 students as of March 2026. It opened in 1925.
