= Smart Road railway station =

Railway station in Waiwhakaiho, New Zealand

Smart Road

General information
- Location: Smart Road; Waiwhakaiho; New Plymouth 4372; New Zealand
- Coordinates: 39°03′06.2″S 174°06′57.3″E
- Elevation: 20 metres (66 ft)
- System: New Zealand Government Railways (NZGR); Regional rail
- Line: Marton–New Plymouth line
- Distance: 204.15 kilometres (126.85 mi) from Marton
- Platforms: Single side
- Tracks: 1

Construction
- Structure type: at-grade
- Parking: yes
- Architectural style: Shelter Shed

History
- Opened: 14 October 1875; 151 years ago
- Rebuilt: 5 April 1988; 38 years ago
- Former names: Smart's Road
Location
Notes
- Previous Station: Egmont Road Station; Next Station (Original): Eliot Street Station; Next Station (New): Fitzroy Station

Smart Road railway station was a small rural station on the Marton–New Plymouth line in Taranaki, New Zealand. Opened on 14 October 1875, it served both passenger and freight traffic until its closure on 5 April 1988, when it was replaced by a new freight terminal on the same site. The station played an important role in supporting the agricultural and industrial development of New Plymouth's eastern fringe.

== History ==
Smart's Road railway station (as it was originally known) was one of the original stops on the New Plymouth–Waitara line, which opened in 1875. It was situated in a predominantly rural area on the far side of the Waiwhakaiho River from central New Plymouth, with few dwellings nearby during its early years. Like many stations on the new line, its location was determined solely by the position of the road crossing, lying just 70 chains (1.4 km) from the next stop at Egmont Road.

Facilities were basic. In 1882 there was a request for authority to spend £46 to "complete" the station, followed by another request in 1884 for £60 to install cattle yards. By 1897 the station was described as having an accommodation shelter shed & passenger platform, 27-wagon loop siding, cart approach and cattle yards. The same year, the station name changed to Smart Road.

=== Location ===
The location of the railway station proved contentious. Residents of the nearby Fitzroy settlement considered Smart’s Road too distant and petitioned for a more conveniently located stop. In 1894, during a visit by Railway Commissioners, a proposal was made to establish a passenger flag stop at Fitzroy, while retaining freight facilities at Smart’s Road.[3] The idea resurfaced in December 1904, with supporters arguing that passenger use at Smart’s Road was low, and that many of those who did alight there were in fact bound for Fitzroy. Opponents of the move noted that Smart’s Road was conveniently located near the local rifle range, and that Fitzroy residents already had access to regular omnibus services into town.

Ultimately, a compromise was reached. In 1907, Fitzroy was granted its own station on the newly constructed Strandon deviation, while Smart Road remained open and continued to operate alongside it.

=== Freight ===
While passenger traffic numbers were questionable, freight volumes were increasing. In 1884 it was reported that Whites' Brickyard had opened, connected by a siding to Smart Road station.

In 1916 the Taranaki Farmers' Meat Company built a freezing works adjacent to the station. A private siding was constructed to serve the works, but the facility ceased operating as a meat works by the 1920s due to unsustainable losses. In 1924 the site was taken over by the New Zealand Farmers' Fertiliser Company. The station yard was further expanded to handle inbound shipments of phosphate and outbound fertiliser, and the site remained a key industrial freight location for decades.

Smart Road also served as the nearest rail access point for the Waiwakaiho Agricultural and Pastoral (A&P) Showgrounds. Stock for the show would often arrive by rail, and the station's stockyards supported the annual event. The showgrounds were eventually sold in 1970 and redeveloped.

Throughout its life, Smart Road remained a modest facility for passengers but a vital freight location. It was staffed with a tablet porter during periods of higher traffic, and a loop siding allowed for the handling of longer freight trains.

=== Facilities ===
The station comprised a short passenger platform, a shelter shed, a loading bank, and stockyards. It had a loop siding capable of holding up to 27 wagons, as well as private sidings that served nearby industries. Over time, the freezing works and later fertiliser operations contributed significantly to the station's traffic.

By the 1980s, New Zealand Railways sought to rationalise operations in the New Plymouth area. Plans were developed for a new freight hub, and Smart Road was selected as the location due to its existing infrastructure and proximity to industrial customers.

=== Notable events ===
In 1931, a washout near the station halted train services temporarily. In 1940, a minor derailment at Smart Road delayed the New Plymouth express.

=== Rebuild into Freight Terminal ===
Although Smart Road station continued to handle traffic into the 1980s, by 1985 New Zealand Railways had begun operating freight services from a new terminal adjacent to the original station site. This facility was designed to replace the increasingly congested city rail yards. On 5 April 1988, Smart Road station was officially closed and the Smart Road Freight Terminal was commissioned. The original shelter shed remained in place until the terminal was completed, after which it was removed.

While the original passenger functions ceased, some of the earlier station trackage remained in use after the new terminal opened, as it was still required to serve private sidings, particularly for the fertiliser works.

=== Today ===
While no trace remains of the original shelter shed or passenger facilities, the site continues to operate as a freight handling location. The Smart Road Freight Hub has played a key role in the regional distribution of fertiliser and other bulk commodities.

By late 2017, Ravensdown’s original fertiliser operations at Smart Road ceased as staff moved to new, smaller premises, and the old site was cleared for demolition. This included the removal of all remaining trackage at the former Smart Road station site.

The site continues to operate as KiwiRail’s New Plymouth Container Transfer (CT) site at 51 Smart Road, handling containerised freight for the region. Log train traffic between Whanganui and New Plymouth has increased since early 2025. Toll New Zealand moved its depot in 2021 to a new road-based facility in the Connet Road industrial estate, ending direct rail-related freight handling at Smart Road."
