= Frankleigh Park =

Suburb of New Plymouth, New Zealand

- Suburb
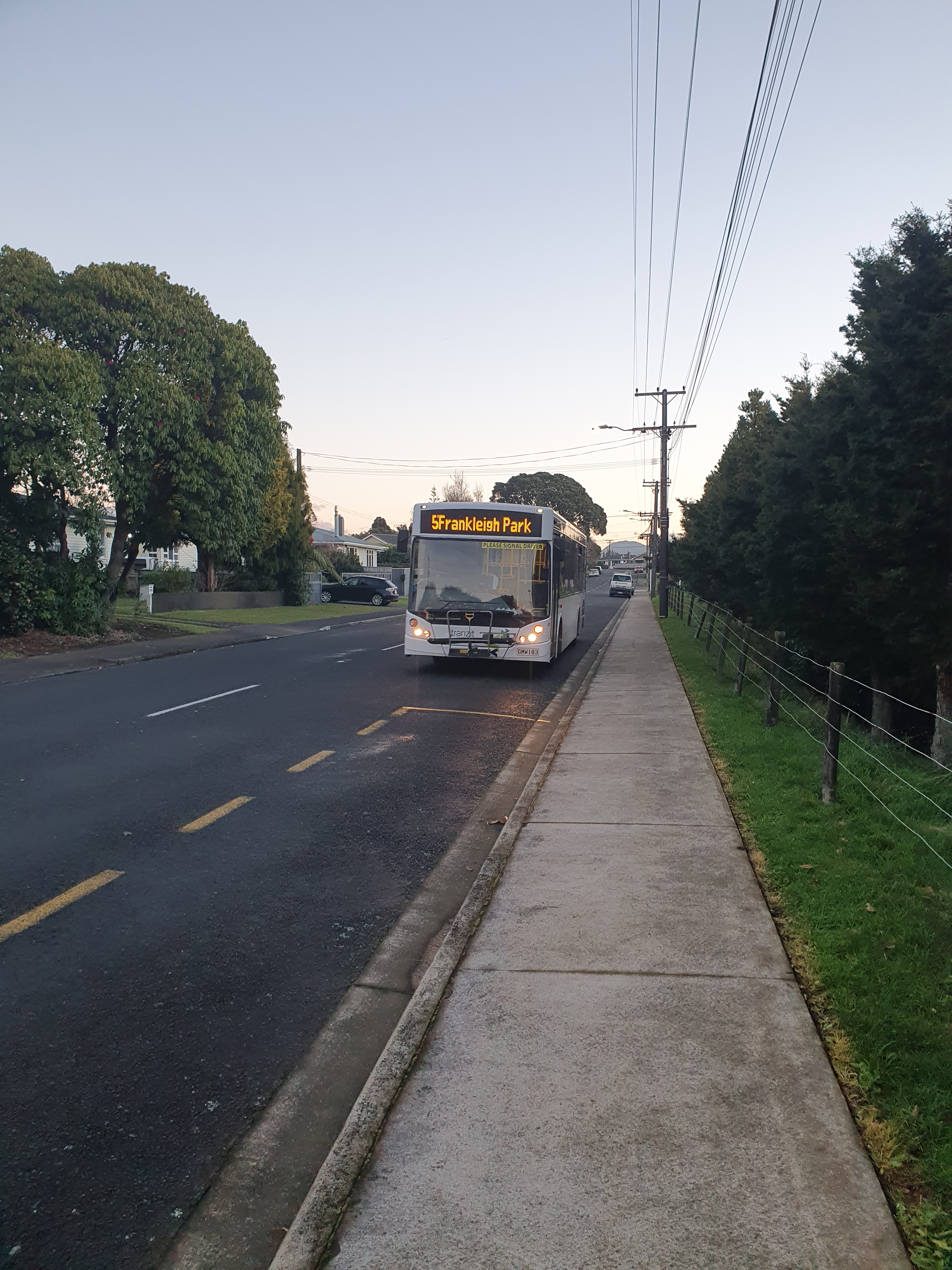
- Frankleigh Park bus in Frankley Road
- Interactive map of Frankleigh Park
- Coordinates: 39°4′47″S 174°4′13″E
- Country: New Zealand
- City: New Plymouth
- Local authority: New Plymouth District Council
- Electoral ward: Kaitake-Ngāmotu General Ward; Te Purutanga Mauri Pūmanawa Māori Ward

Area
  - Land: 373 ha (920 acres)

Population (June 2025)
  - Total: 3,480
  - Density: 933/km^{2} (2,420/sq mi)

	New Plymouth Central
Westown	Frankleigh Park	Vogeltown
Ferndale

Frankleigh Park is a suburb of New Plymouth, in the western North Island of New Zealand. It is located to the south of the city centre. The suburb is built around the site of early settler Henry King's farm, Woodleigh, the father of William Cutfield King.

The suburb is one of the older and more established suburbs of the city, lying in the valley of the Huatoki River. It lies between the suburbs of Westown to the west, and Vogeltown to the east.

Some of the main streets include Brois Street, Veale Road, Frankley Road, Fernleigh Street, Govett Avenue, and Ashmore Drive. Frankleigh Park is home to a primary school, a kindergarten and a shopping centre, and has two large parks, Sutherland Park and Ferndale Park.

== Demographics ==
Frankleigh Park covers 3.73 km^{2} (1.44 sq mi) and had an estimated population of 3,480 as of June 2025, with a population density of 933 people per km^{2}.

Historical population
Year	Pop.	±% p.a.
2006	2,880	—
2013	3,054	+0.84%
2018	3,204	+0.96%
2023	3,330	+0.77%
The 2006 population is for a smaller area of 2.11 km^{2}. Source:

Frankleigh Park had a population of 3,330 in the 2023 New Zealand census, an increase of 126 people (3.9%) since the 2018 census, and an increase of 276 people (9.0%) since the 2013 census. There were 1,632 males, 1,683 females, and 15 people of other genders in 1,251 dwellings. 2.6% of people identified as LGBTIQ+. The median age was 38.8 years (compared with 38.1 years nationally). There were 726 people (21.8%) aged under 15 years, 546 (16.4%) aged 15 to 29, 1,527 (45.9%) aged 30 to 64, and 528 (15.9%) aged 65 or older.

People could identify as more than one ethnicity. The results were 86.4% European (Pākehā); 16.0% Māori; 2.3% Pasifika; 7.2% Asian; 0.8% Middle Eastern, Latin American and African New Zealanders (MELAA); and 2.2% other, which includes people giving their ethnicity as "New Zealander". English was spoken by 97.7%, Māori by 3.2%, Samoan by 0.2%, and other languages by 9.4%. No language could be spoken by 2.0% (e.g. too young to talk). New Zealand Sign Language was known by 0.4%. The percentage of people born overseas was 19.5, compared with 28.8% nationally.

Religious affiliations were 29.8% Christian, 0.9% Hindu, 0.6% Islam, 0.1% Māori religious beliefs, 0.2% Buddhist, 0.6% New Age, 0.1% Jewish, and 1.5% other religions. People who answered that they had no religion were 58.6%, and 7.5% of people did not answer the census question.

Of those at least 15 years old, 669 (25.7%) people had a bachelor's or higher degree, 1,428 (54.8%) had a post-high school certificate or diploma, and 507 (19.5%) people exclusively held high school qualifications. The median income was $42,000, compared with $41,500 nationally. 333 people (12.8%) earned over $100,000 compared to 12.1% nationally. The employment status of those at least 15 was 1,338 (51.4%) full-time, 405 (15.6%) part-time, and 57 (2.2%) unemployed.

== Education ==
Woodleigh School is a coeducational contributing primary (years 1–6) school with a roll of 428 students as of July 2025.
