= Whalers Gate =

Suburb of New Plymouth, New Zealand

- Suburb
- Interactive map of Whalers Gate
- Coordinates: 39.086°S 174.034°E
- Country: New Zealand
- City: New Plymouth
- Local authority: New Plymouth District Council
- Electoral ward: Kaitake-Ngāmotu General Ward; Te Purutanga Mauri Pūmanawa Māori Ward

Area
  - Land: 312 ha (770 acres)

Population (June 2025)
  - Total: 2,750
  - Density: 881/km^{2} (2,280/sq mi)

	Spotswood	Marfell
	Whalers Gate	Hurdon
Omata		Hurdon

Whalers Gate is a suburb of New Plymouth, in the western North Island of New Zealand. It is located to the southwest of the city centre.

The area was allocated to several whalers in 1847, and was called "The Whaler's Gate" at least from 1860. The main street, Barrett Road, is named after Dicky Barrett, one of the whalers.

== Demographics ==
Whalers Gate covers 3.12 km^{2} (1.20 sq mi) and had an estimated population of 2,750 as of June 2025, with a population density of 881 people per km^{2}.

Historical population
Year	Pop.	±% p.a.
2006	1,320	—
2013	1,920	+5.50%
2018	2,331	+3.96%
2023	2,724	+3.17%
The 2006 population is for a smaller area of 2.09 km^{2}. Source:

Whalers Gate had a population of 2,724 in the 2023 New Zealand census, an increase of 393 people (16.9%) since the 2018 census, and an increase of 804 people (41.9%) since the 2013 census. There were 1,287 males, 1,428 females, and 9 people of other genders in 1,029 dwellings. 2.0% of people identified as LGBTIQ+. The median age was 47.7 years (compared with 38.1 years nationally). There were 444 people (16.3%) aged under 15 years, 357 (13.1%) aged 15 to 29, 1,101 (40.4%) aged 30 to 64, and 822 (30.2%) aged 65 or older.

People could identify as more than one ethnicity. The results were 83.8% European (Pākehā); 10.2% Māori; 1.0% Pasifika; 12.1% Asian; 1.2% Middle Eastern, Latin American and African New Zealanders (MELAA); and 2.8% other, which includes people giving their ethnicity as "New Zealander". English was spoken by 97.9%, Māori by 2.8%, Samoan by 0.2%, and other languages by 11.3%. No language could be spoken by 1.2% (e.g. too young to talk). New Zealand Sign Language was known by 0.6%. The percentage of people born overseas was 22.9, compared with 28.8% nationally.

Religious affiliations were 42.6% Christian, 1.4% Hindu, 0.9% Islam, 0.2% Māori religious beliefs, 1.0% Buddhist, 0.3% New Age, and 1.5% other religions. People who answered that they had no religion were 43.7%, and 8.5% of people did not answer the census question.

Of those at least 15 years old, 507 (22.2%) people had a bachelor's or higher degree, 1,209 (53.0%) had a post-high school certificate or diploma, and 567 (24.9%) people exclusively held high school qualifications. The median income was $35,600, compared with $41,500 nationally. 276 people (12.1%) earned over $100,000 compared to 12.1% nationally. The employment status of those at least 15 was 963 (42.2%) full-time, 297 (13.0%) part-time, and 39 (1.7%) unemployed.
