= Fitzroy railway station, New Zealand =

Railway station in New Plymouth, New Zealand

Fitzroy
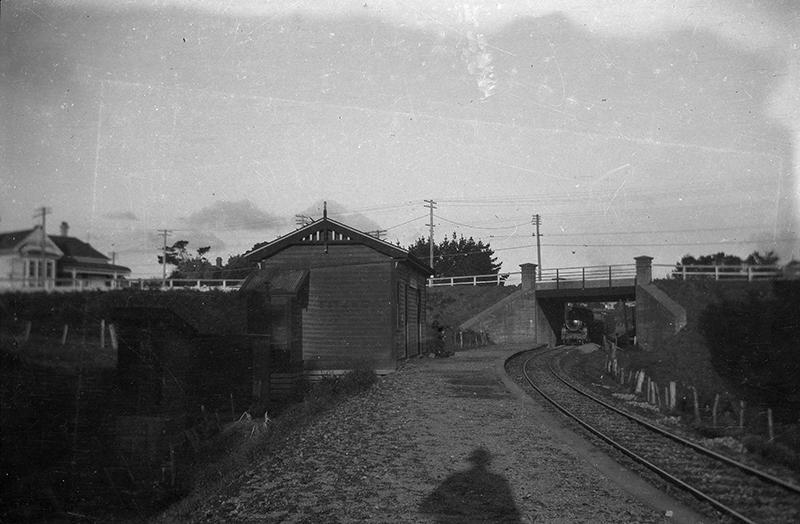
- Fitzroy Railway Station at Strandon, circa 1930s. A train is pulling into the station where two people are waiting. The train tracks, station and overbridge are visible in the picture

General information
- Other names: Strandon
- Location: Strandon 4312; New Zealand
- Coordinates: 39°03′04.5″S 174°05′36.4″E
- Elevation: 15 metres (49 ft)
- System: New Zealand Government Railways (NZGR); Regional rail
- Line: Marton–New Plymouth line
- Distance: 207.3 kilometres (128.8 mi) from Marton
- Platforms: Single side
- Tracks: 1

Construction
- Structure type: at-grade
- Parking: no
- Architect: George Troup
- Architectural style: Troup Class B

History
- Opened: 16 December 1907
- Closed: 28 January 1963
Location
Notes
- Previous Station: Smart Road Station; Next Station: New Plymouth station

Fitzroy railway station was a suburban railway station on the Marton–New Plymouth line serving the suburbs of Fitzroy and Strandon in New Plymouth, Taranaki. It replaced the former Eliot Street station and was open for around 55 years until its closure in the early 1960s. A small halt called East End Platform (originally "Autere Street" platform) also existed between New Plymouth and Fitzroy, mainly for picnic and excursion traffic.

== History ==
Fitzroy railway station was established in 1907 as part of the New Plymouth railway deviation. It opened on 16 December 1907 under the temporary name "Strandon", as it lay in the Strandon area of New Plymouth. Within a short time it was formally renamed Fitzroy, after the nearest major suburb. Like its predecessor, Fitzroy had a simple configuration – just a passenger platform and small station building with no goods yard. The new station was located 1 mile 28 chains (2.1 km) from New Plymouth Station on the inland deviation, near today's Devon Street East overbridge.

Its establishment fulfilled a long-standing local wish: Fitzroy residents had petitioned for a station as early as 1891–1898, arguing they were too far from the existing stops at Smart Road or Eliot Street station, especially when wishing to travel long distances. A 1904 newspaper editorial noted that a station at Fitzroy would attract considerable suburban traffic, which was otherwise going by road, and anticipated that once Eliot Street closed, "Fitzroy … will be the nearest station to town" on that side.

Once opened, Fitzroy Station became an important suburban stop. It was conveniently close to local institutions – for example, the new Girls' High School hostel (Strandon House) opened in 1917 "within easy distance of the school" and "situated close to the Fitzroy railway station", a noted advantage for boarders arriving by train. In 1929, local resident John Hunt earned praise for planting extensive gardens at Fitzroy station, with donated shrubs, flowers, and even landscaping the adjacent hillside into lawns. The result transformed the little wayside stop into an attractive spot – Hunt spent over £50 and three months' labour on the project.

Throughout its operation, Fitzroy was essentially a flag stop for local traffic as well as a drop-off point for special excursion trains. New Plymouth's trams competed for town traffic from 1916, with a 2p adult fare between Fitzroy and New Plymouth stations, but holiday traffic and picnic trains kept the station busy. For instance, holiday excursion timetables in the 1930s show that trains would stop at Fitzroy to pick up or drop off picnic-goers on their way to New Plymouth or the Breakwater (port) festivities.

In 1938 the Fitzroy Ratepayers' Association requested that a goods shed and siding be constructed at Fitzroy. The Railway Board declined this based on the likely small level of traffic on offer, as well as the difficulties the site would present, and the proximity to Smart Road railway station.

By the 1950s, patronage had declined with the rise of road transport. The original 1907 station building – a 40-foot wooden shelter – was removed in October 1957 and replaced with a small "bus-type" shelter, as New Zealand Railways began rationalising stations. Fitzroy station continued as an unmanned halt for a few more years, officially closing to all traffic on 28 January 1963.

=== East End Platform ===
East End Platform was a minor request stop located between New Plymouth and Fitzroy, near the mouth of the Te Henui stream at New Plymouth's east end. It opened in September 1913 under the name "Autere Street platform". Around 1915, it was renamed East End Platform, reflecting its location serving the East End Beach and reserve. This was never a full station – it was essentially a short wooden platform with basic access, provided for the convenience of excursion traffic.

East End became popular for picnic trains and holiday excursions. Schools and community groups from around Taranaki would take special trains to New Plymouth's coastal attractions, with some passengers disembarking at East End, which was adjacent to the beach and recreational grounds. For example, a Stratford school excursion in 1916 ran morning trains to New Plymouth and had the return trains depart "from East End Platform at 5 and 5.15 pm' after the day's outing. Likewise, public excursion trains in the 1930s stopped at East End Platform to set down or pick up hundreds of passengers heading to beach picnics and events – one 1939 timetable lists the stop alongside Fitzroy and central New Plymouth for a Sunday special from Wanganui.

East End Platform was always unmanned and had no facilities beyond the small platform (and possibly a name board). It primarily saw use during summer and holiday weekends. The halt survived into the mid-20th century; it was finally closed (along with a raft of other minor halts) in 1969.

== Today ==
Today, the site of Fitzroy Station near the Devon Street East overbridge no longer contains any station structures. The overbridge (built extra wide in 1907 to span double tracks) still stands as a clue to the railway's presence, but the platform and buildings have long since been removed or demolished.

The site of East End Platform is still visible - its approximate location is near the current coastal walkway by East End Reserve, but any sign of the old platform has been erased by time and redevelopment.
