= Marfell =

Suburb of New Plymouth, New Zealand

- Suburb
- Interactive map of Marfell
- Coordinates: 39°4′28″S 174°2′44″E
- Country: New Zealand
- City: New Plymouth
- Local authority: New Plymouth District Council
- Electoral ward: Kaitake-Ngāmotu General Ward; Te Purutanga Mauri Pūmanawa Māori Ward

Area
  - Land: 73 ha (180 acres)

Population (June 2025)
  - Total: 2,060
  - Density: 2,800/km^{2} (7,300/sq mi)

Spotswood	Blagdon
	Marfell	Westown
Whalers Gate		Hurdon

Marfell is a suburb of New Plymouth, in the western North Island of New Zealand. It is located to the southwest of the city centre. The Mangaotuku Stream runs past Marfell.

== Demographics ==
Marfell covers 0.73 km^{2} (0.28 sq mi) and had an estimated population of 2,060 as of June 2025, with a population density of 2,822 people per km^{2}.

Historical population
Year	Pop.	±% p.a.
2006	1,605	—
2013	1,530	−0.68%
2018	1,665	+1.71%
2023	1,986	+3.59%

Marfell had a population of 1,986 in the 2023 New Zealand census, an increase of 321 people (19.3%) since the 2018 census, and an increase of 456 people (29.8%) since the 2013 census. There were 993 males, 984 females, and 9 people of other genders in 666 dwellings. 3.6% of people identified as LGBTIQ+. The median age was 31.1 years (compared with 38.1 years nationally). There were 528 people (26.6%) aged under 15 years, 426 (21.5%) aged 15 to 29, 873 (44.0%) aged 30 to 64, and 162 (8.2%) aged 65 or older.

People could identify as more than one ethnicity. The results were 69.8% European (Pākehā); 40.2% Māori; 4.5% Pasifika; 9.1% Asian; 0.9% Middle Eastern, Latin American and African New Zealanders (MELAA); and 2.0% other, which includes people giving their ethnicity as "New Zealander". English was spoken by 96.8%, Māori by 9.7%, Samoan by 0.2%, and other languages by 7.1%. No language could be spoken by 2.3% (e.g. too young to talk). New Zealand Sign Language was known by 0.3%. The percentage of people born overseas was 14.7, compared with 28.8% nationally.

Religious affiliations were 21.3% Christian, 1.7% Hindu, 0.6% Islam, 2.7% Māori religious beliefs, 0.3% Buddhist, 1.2% New Age, and 2.0% other religions. People who answered that they had no religion were 63.3%, and 6.8% of people did not answer the census question.

Of those at least 15 years old, 189 (13.0%) people had a bachelor's or higher degree, 819 (56.2%) had a post-high school certificate or diploma, and 450 (30.9%) people exclusively held high school qualifications. The median income was $34,300, compared with $41,500 nationally. 57 people (3.9%) earned over $100,000 compared to 12.1% nationally. The employment status of those at least 15 was 696 (47.7%) full-time, 192 (13.2%) part-time, and 72 (4.9%) unemployed.

== Education ==
Marfell Community School is a coeducational contributing primary (years 1–6) school with a roll of 129 students as of July 2025. The school was founded in 1961 on an old pā site called Pukeori. The roll reached a high of 487 in 1974.
