= Vogeltown, New Plymouth =

Suburb of New Plymouth, New Zealand

Vogeltown
- Suburb
- Interactive map of Vogeltown
- Coordinates: 39°4′42″S 174°4′47″E
- Country: New Zealand
- City: New Plymouth
- Local authority: New Plymouth District Council
- Electoral ward: Kaitake-Ngāmotu General Ward; Te Purutanga Mauri Pūmanawa Māori Ward

Area
  - Land: 396 ha (980 acres)

Population (June 2025)
  - Total: 6,220
  - Density: 1,570/km^{2} (4,070/sq mi)

| Westown | New Plymouth Central | Brooklands |
| Frankleigh Park | Vogeltown | Highlands Park |

Vogeltown is a suburb of New Plymouth, in the western North Island of New Zealand. It is located to the southeast of the city centre and east of Frankleigh Park. The suburb was named after Sir Julius Vogel, Prime Minister of New Zealand in the 1870s.

== Demographics ==
Vogeltown covers 3.96 km^{2} (1.53 sq mi) and had an estimated population of 6,220 as of June 2025, with a population density of 1,571 people per km^{2}.

Historical population
| Year | Pop. | ±% p.a. |
|---|---|---|
| 2006 | 4,821 | — |
| 2013 | 5,004 | +0.53% |
| 2018 | 5,607 | +2.30% |
| 2023 | 6,012 | +1.40% |

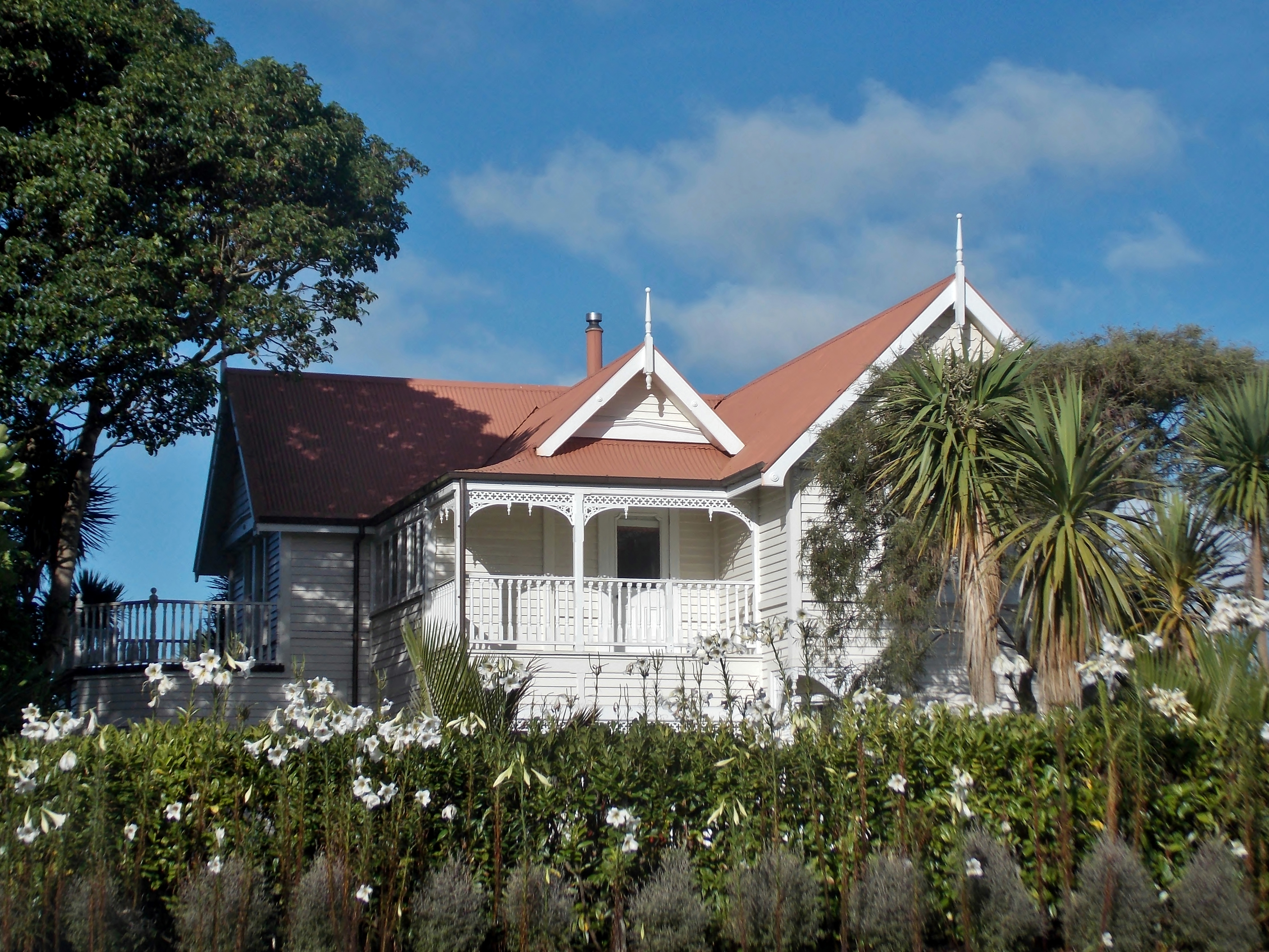
A villa in Carrington Street

Vogeltown had a population of 6,012 in the 2023 New Zealand census, an increase of 405 people (7.2%) since the 2018 census, and an increase of 1,008 people (20.1%) since the 2013 census. There were 2,853 males, 3,138 females, and 18 people of other genders in 2,493 dwellings. 3.1% of people identified as LGBTIQ+. The median age was 41.0 years (compared with 38.1 years nationally). There were 1,191 people (19.8%) aged under 15 years, 906 (15.1%) aged 15 to 29, 2,643 (44.0%) aged 30 to 64, and 1,269 (21.1%) aged 65 or older.

People could identify as more than one ethnicity. The results were 86.0% European (Pākehā); 15.7% Māori; 1.9% Pasifika; 7.0% Asian; 1.1% Middle Eastern, Latin American and African New Zealanders (MELAA); and 3.5% other, which includes people giving their ethnicity as "New Zealander". English was spoken by 97.0%, Māori by 2.7%, Samoan by 0.3%, and other languages by 9.4%. No language could be spoken by 2.2% (e.g. too young to talk). New Zealand Sign Language was known by 0.5%. The percentage of people born overseas was 19.2, compared with 28.8% nationally.

Religious affiliations were 31.6% Christian, 0.8% Hindu, 0.5% Islam, 0.2% Māori religious beliefs, 0.7% Buddhist, 0.4% New Age, 0.1% Jewish, and 1.2% other religions. People who answered that they had no religion were 57.0%, and 7.3% of people did not answer the census question.

Of those at least 15 years old, 1,221 (25.3%) people had a bachelor's or higher degree, 2,541 (52.7%) had a post-high school certificate or diploma, and 1,059 (22.0%) people exclusively held high school qualifications. The median income was $39,900, compared with $41,500 nationally. 591 people (12.3%) earned over $100,000 compared to 12.1% nationally. The employment status of those at least 15 was 2,337 (48.5%) full-time, 723 (15.0%) part-time, and 87 (1.8%) unemployed.

Individual statistical areas
| Name | Area (km^{2}) | Population | Density (per km^{2}) | Dwellings | Median age | Median income |
|---|---|---|---|---|---|---|
| Lower Vogeltown | 1.50 | 3,033 | 2,022 | 1,281 | 40.8 years | $41,700 |
| Upper Vogeltown | 2.46 | 2,979 | 1,211 | 1,209 | 41.2 years | $38,000 |
| New Zealand | | | | | 38.1 years | $41,500 |

== Education ==
Vogeltown School is a contributing primary (years 1–6) school with a roll of 352 students. The school was established in temporary premises in July 1915 and moved to its own site in May 1919.

New Plymouth Seventh Day Adventist School is a state integrated full primary (years 1–8) school with a roll of 65.

Both schools are coeducational. Rolls are as of July 2025.
