= Forest View High School, Tokoroa =

Forest View High School

Location
- Baird Road, Tokoroa; 38.2198°S 175.8427°E

Information
- Type: State co-ed secondary, years 9–13
- Motto: Māori: Kia Kaha! Kia Toa! Kia Manawanui! Courage Knows No Defeat!
- Established: 1974; 52 years ago
- Ministry of Education Institution no.: 159
- Principal: Andrew Bramston
- Enrolment: 425 (July 2026)
- Socio-economic decile: 2F
- Website: forestviewhigh.school.nz

Forest View High School is a state co-educational secondary school located on the western outskirts of Tokoroa, New Zealand. It opened in 1974 and serves students in years 9 to 13. It is one of two secondary schools at Tokoroa, the other being Tokoroa High School. Like many New Zealand state secondary schools of 1970s construction, the school was built to the S68 design, characterised by single-storey classroom blocks with concrete block walls, low-pitched roofs and internal open courtyards.

== Enrolment ==
As of July 2026, Forest View High School has a roll of 425 students, of which 244 (57.4%) identify as Māori.

As of 2026, the school has an Equity Index of 517, placing it amongst schools whose students have many socioeconomic barriers to achievement (roughly equivalent to deciles 2 and 3 under the former socio-economic decile system).

== Notable alumni ==
- Tim Armstrong – notable New Zealand musician The Politicians was a founding pupil in 1974
- Willie Bishop – Australian Sevens squad 2009
- Isaac Boss – Ireland national rugby union team; Waikato N.P.C Cap #964: 1999, 2001–05, 52 games; Waikato Chiefs Super Rugby
- Quade Cooper – Wallabies, Queensland Reds, Australian Schoolboys Rugby Team 2002
- Ian Foster – current All Blacks coach, Waikato Rugby team
- Michael Gielen (born 2 June 1971) – Auxiliary Bishop of the Roman Catholic Diocese of Auckland was Deputy Head Boy in 1989.
- Jasin Goldsmith – All Blacks #893 (1988); Waikato N.P.C Cap #847: 1987–88, 24 games
- Isaac John – New Zealand and Cook Islands representative rugby league player
- Richard Kahui – All Blacks #1076 2008–11; Waikato Chiefs Super Rugby 2007–11; Waikato N.P.C Cap #1018: 2004–06, 2008–11, 36 games
- James Kamana – New Zealand Sevens Squad 2008, Waikato Chiefs Super Rugby 2007–08; Waikato N.P.C Cap #1050: 2007–08, 13 games
- Monique Williams – New Zealand's fastest female sprinter, Australian 100 and 200m National champion (2007)
