= Jasin Goldsmith =

- Born: Jasin Alex Goldsmith; 24 July 1969 (age 57) Tokoroa, New Zealand
- Height: 1.81 m (5 ft 11 in)
- Weight: 87 kg (192 lb)
- School: Forest View High School

Rugby union career
- Position: Utility back
Provincial / State sides
Years	Team	Apps	(Points)
1987–88	Waikato	24	
1989–90	Auckland	4	
1993	Bay of Plenty	11	
International career
Years	Team	Apps	(Points)
1988	New Zealand	0	(0)
1988–91	New Zealand Māori	9	
1990	New Zealand Colts	3	

Jasin Alex Goldsmith (born 24 July 1969) is a former New Zealand rugby union player. A utility back, Goldsmith first represented Waikato aged 17 and later also played for Auckland and Bay of Plenty at a provincial level. He was a member of the New Zealand national side, the All Blacks, on their 1988 tour of Australia, playing in eight matches but no internationals.
