= Bruce Simpson =

Bruce Simpson may refer to:

- Bruce Simpson (athlete) (born 1950), Canadian Olympic pole vaulter
- Bruce Simpson (blogger), New Zealand blogger
