= Inglewood High School =

Inglewood High School may refer to the following schools:

- Inglewood High School (California)
- Inglewood High School, New Zealand
