= David Gauld (mathematician) =

New Zealand mathematician

David Gauld ONZM
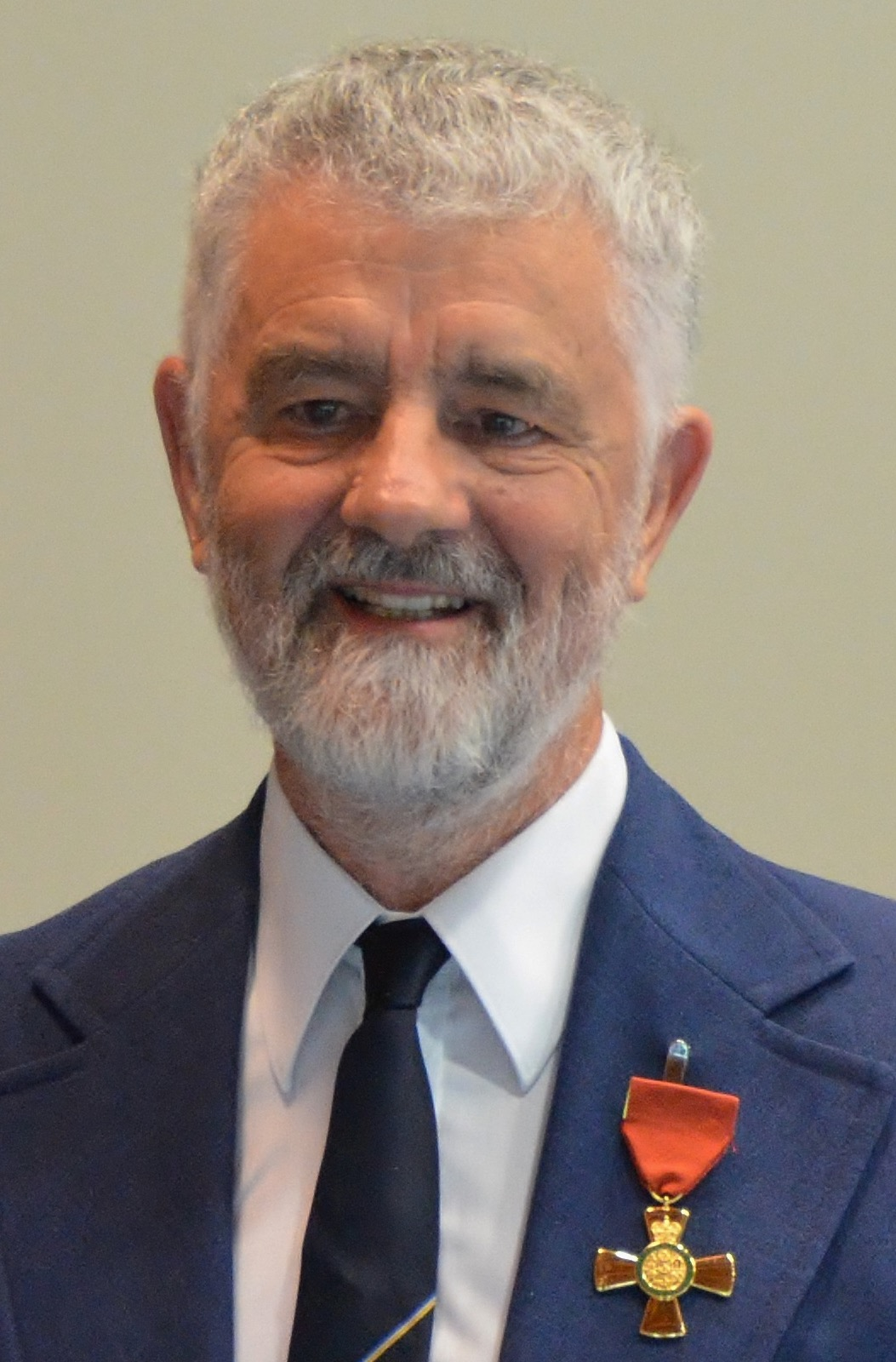
- Gauld in 2016
- Born: 28 June 1942 (age 84); Inglewood, New Zealand
- Awards: New Zealand Science and Technology Medal; Honorary life member of the New Zealand Mathematical Society

Academic background
- Education: Wanganui Technical College; Inglewood High School; New Plymouth Boys' High School
- Alma mater: University of California, Los Angeles
- Thesis: Mersions of Topological Manifolds (1969)
- Doctoral advisor: Robion Kirby

Academic work
- Discipline: Topology
- Institutions: University of Auckland
- Doctoral students: Sina Greenwood

David Barry Gauld ONZM (born 28 June 1942) is a New Zealand mathematician. He is a professor of mathematics at the University of Auckland.

== Biography ==
Within mathematics, Gauld works in set-theoretic topology with emphasis on applications to non-metrisable manifolds and topological properties of manifolds close to metrisability. Gauld has authored two monographs and over 70 research papers.

Gauld was born on 28 June 1942 in Inglewood and grew up there. He was educated at Wanganui Technical College, Inglewood High School and New Plymouth Boys’ High School, and later obtained his BSc and MSc degrees with first-class honours in mathematics from the University of Auckland.

Awarded a Fulbright Grant, he completed his PhD in topology, in the University of California, Los Angeles, supervised by Robion Kirby. He was Head of the Department of Mathematics for 15 years and Assistant Vice-Chancellor (Research) for two-and-a-half years at the University of Auckland.

Notable students of Gauld include Sina Greenwood.

== Honours ==
In the years 1981–1982, Gauld served as president of the New Zealand Mathematical Society. He was the founding secretary of the New Zealand Mathematics Research Institute, and served in this position for 13 years, retiring in 2011. In 1997, he was awarded a New Zealand Science and Technology Medal by the Royal Society of New Zealand. In 2015, he became an honorary life member of the New Zealand Mathematical Society. In the 2016 New Year Honours, Gauld was appointed an Officer of the New Zealand Order of Merit for services to mathematics.
