= Tokoroa =

Town in Waikato, New Zealand

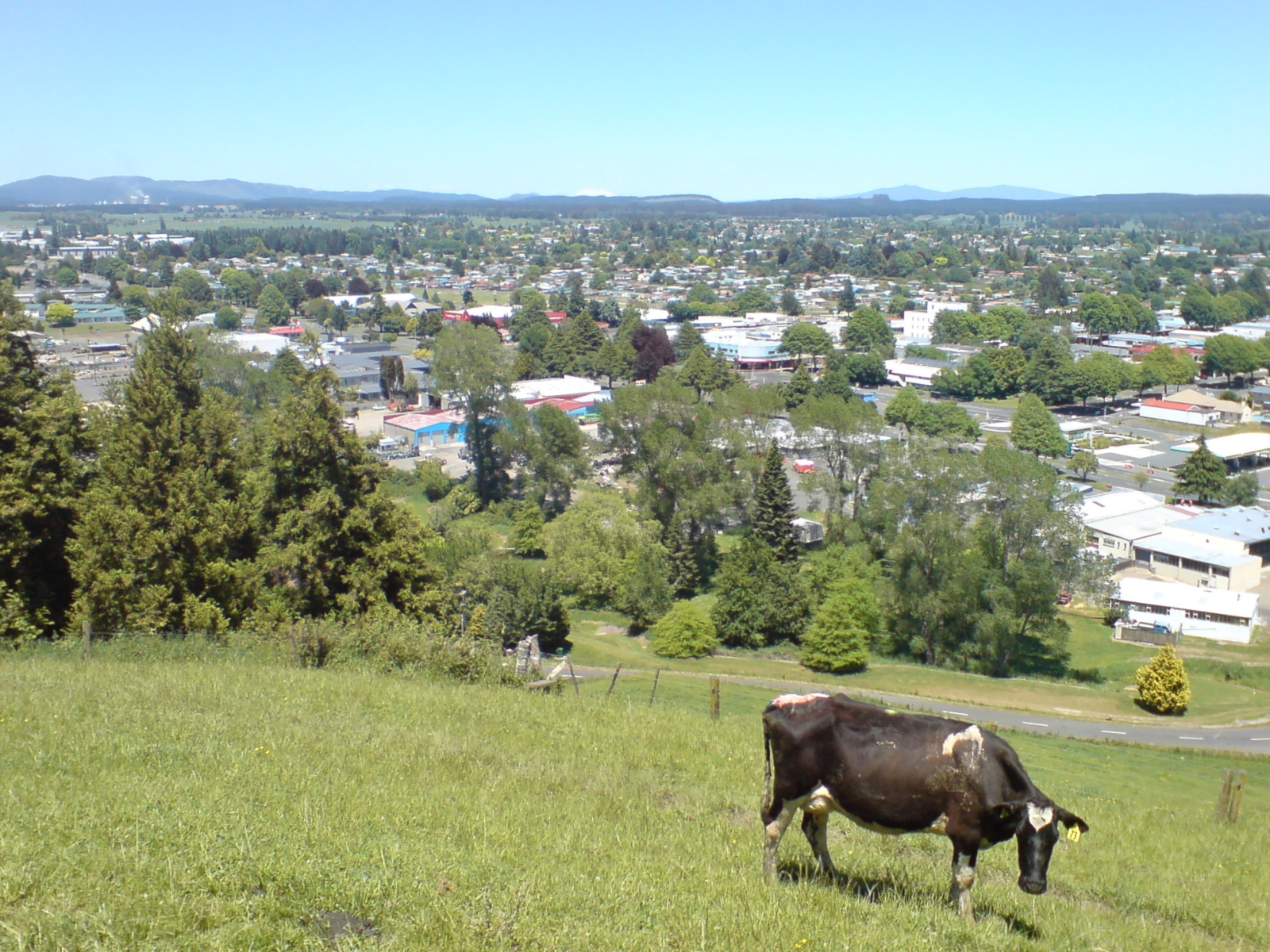
- Tokoroa from Colson Hill (2007)
- Interactive map of Tokoroa
- Coordinates: 38°13′S 175°52′E
- Country: New Zealand
- Region: Waikato Region
- District: South Waikato District
- Ward: Tokoroa Ward
- Electorates: Taupō; Te Tai Hauāuru (Māori)

Government
  - Territorial Authority: South Waikato District Council
  - Regional council: Waikato Regional Council
  - Mayor of South Waikato: Gary Petley
  - Taupō MP: Louise Upston
  - Te Tai Hauāuru MP: Debbie Ngarewa-Packer

Area
  - Total: 15.65 km^{2} (6.04 sq mi)

Population (June 2025)
  - Total: 14,500
  - Density: 927/km^{2} (2,400/sq mi)
- Postcode(s): 3420

Tokoroa is the fourth-largest town in the Waikato region of the North Island of New Zealand and largest settlement in the South Waikato District. Located 30 km southwest of Rotorua and 20 km south of Putāruru, close to the foot of the Mamaku Ranges, it is midway between Taupō and Hamilton on State Highway 1.

== History and culture ==
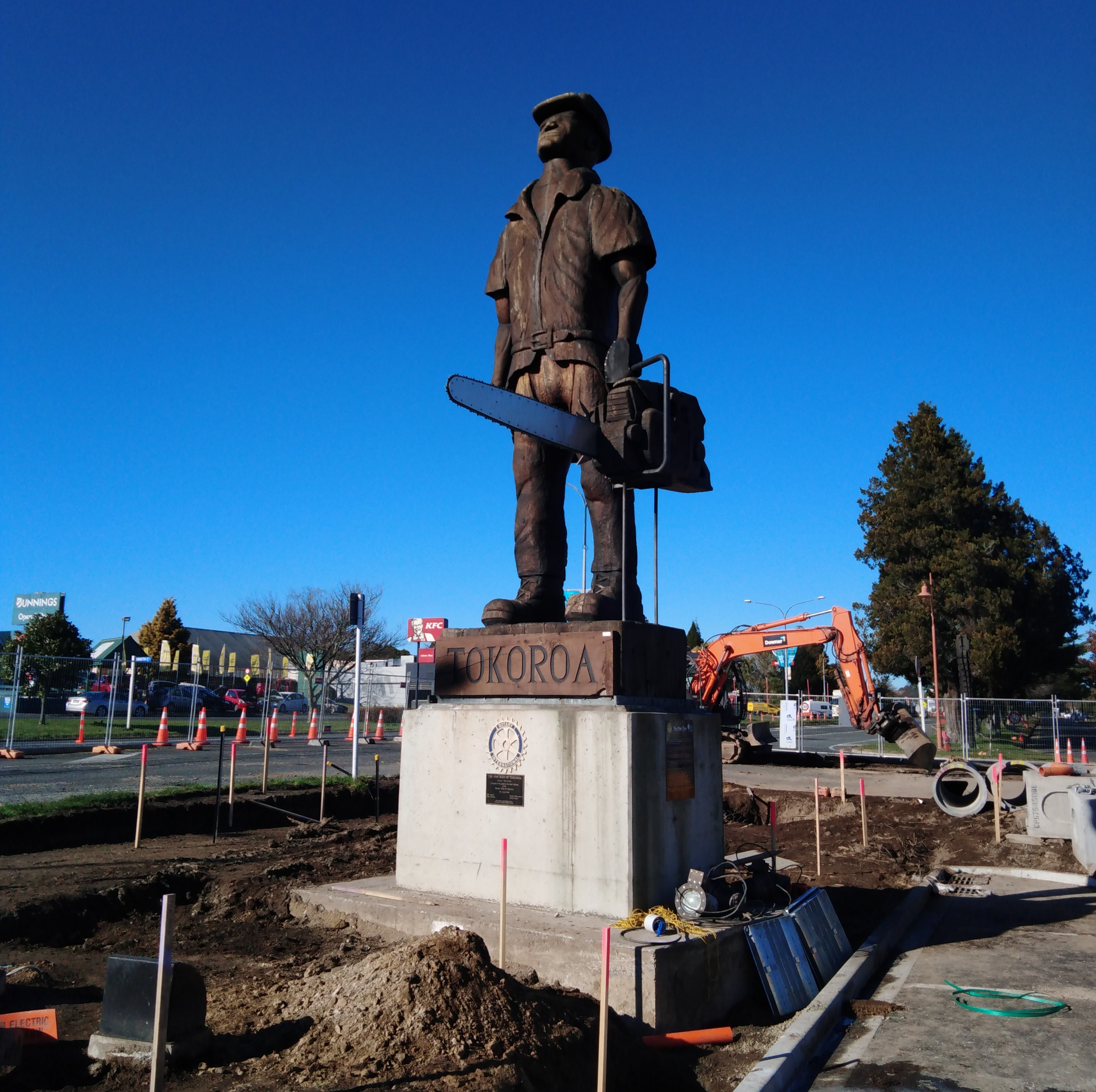
Pine man, sculpture in Tokoroa.

=== Early history ===
Tokoroa was the name of a chief of the Ngāti Kahupungapunga, who was slain by Raukawa during the siege of Pōhaturoa, a volcanic plug adjacent to Ātiamuri, 27 km south of Tokoroa. This battle took place around 1600 as the Ngāti Raukawa moved into the southern Waikato. The name Tokoroa first appeared on the early maps of the 1860s, although this was for an area 50 km north east of today's Tokoroa.

=== Foundations, growth and decline ===
Tokoroa is one of the most recent towns in New Zealand. The township was established (circa) 1917 by the Matarawa Land Company as a potential farming area; a few families had already settled in the area after 1910, and a school with 9 pupils was founded in 1915 (later to become Tokoroa East School). The land was found to be too poor for raising cattle or sheep due to its predominant pumice soils. However, agricultural science showed the land could actually be made to successfully support dairy cattle. The soil had serious deficiencies causing livestock to suffer from what became known as "bush sickness" (later found to be cobalt deficiency). In the 1930s, the deficiency was addressed, and subsequently, cattle farming became profitable.

Between 1925 and 1935 Pinus radiata was first introduced to the district as a commercial tree crop – the trees were found not to be adversely affected by the local soil deficiencies. As the initial crops matured, Tokoroa was then developed as a residential satellite for Kinleith Mill workers (New Zealand Forest Products Limited's integrated timber, pulp and paper mill), approximately 8 km south of the township. In 1948, Tokoroa had a population of 1,100. By the early 1970s, however, Tokoroa reached, for a time, a population of over 20,000 – the number necessary to be officially deemed a city. In the 1980s years NZFP (and later, mill-owner Carter Holt Harvey Ltd) began to downscale and restructure operations at Kinleith. Since the late 1980s this ongoing downscaling at Kinleith – and closing of other local industries – resulted in a marked drop in population. Census figures put the 2018 population at approximately 14,300.

In late June 2025, Oji Fibre Solutions ceased paper production operations at its Kinleith Mill, affecting 130 jobs. In late September 2025, Carter Holt Harvey confirmed that it would close its Tokoroa plywood plant, affecting 149 jobs. The double impact from these two major job losses, which affected 249 people, was described by both RNZ and The Conversation as a "blow to a dying forestry town."

=== Marae ===
Tokoroa has two marae connected to local iwi and hapū:

- Ngātira Marae and Te Tikanga a Tāwhiao meeting house are associated with the Ngāti Raukawa hapū of Ngāti Ahuru and the Waikato Tainui hapū of Ngāti Korokī and Ngāti Raukawa ki Panehākua.
- Ōngāroto Marae and Whaita meeting house are affiliated with the Ngāti Raukawa hapū of Ngāti Whaita.

In October 2020, the Government committed $1,259,392 from the Provincial Growth Fund to upgrade Ngātira Marae and 7 other Ngāti Raukawa marae, creating 18 jobs.

== Geography ==
=== Location ===
Surrounding the township are many dairy farms and plantation forests. There are many scenic reserves around the town – the artificial Lake Moananui (formed by damming the Matarawa Stream in 1974/75) lies within a recreational park.

Tokoroa lies in the centre of a triangle made up of the tourism destinations of Rotorua, Waitomo and Taupō. There are also about 45 recreational lakes within less than an hour's drive of Tokoroa.

=== Geology ===
Tokoroa is built on Whakamaru ignimbrite, extruded about 345,000 years ago.

=== Township ===
As well as the central business district, the township is made up of many subdivisions, each built in different stages of the Kinleith complex's development. These subdivisions are:

- Parkdale
- Paraonui
- Papanui
- Matarawa
- Aotea
- Strathmore
- Amisfield

Many of the street names of the town were named by the first managing director of N.Z. Forest Products Ltd.(builders of the Kinleith mill), Sir David Henry (1888–1963), after places near his hometown of Edinburgh, in Scotland. David Henry Primary School is a key example of him and his namesaking.

=== Climate ===
Climate data for Tokoroa, elevation 305 m (1,001 ft), (1973–1981)
Month	Jan	Feb	Mar	Apr	May	Jun	Jul	Aug	Sep	Oct	Nov	Dec	Year
Record high °C (°F)	29.4 (84.9)	30.5 (86.9)	27.5 (81.5)	24.3 (75.7)	20.5 (68.9)	17.6 (63.7)	15.8 (60.4)	18.4 (65.1)	22.6 (72.7)	22.5 (72.5)	26.7 (80.1)	29.1 (84.4)	30.5 (86.9)
Mean maximum °C (°F)	27.8 (82.0)	27.8 (82.0)	25.6 (78.1)	22.4 (72.3)	18.2 (64.8)	16.0 (60.8)	14.7 (58.5)	16.3 (61.3)	18.9 (66.0)	21.4 (70.5)	24.0 (75.2)	26.3 (79.3)	28.7 (83.7)
Mean daily maximum °C (°F)	23.8 (74.8)	23.8 (74.8)	21.9 (71.4)	18.7 (65.7)	14.7 (58.5)	12.2 (54.0)	11.7 (53.1)	12.9 (55.2)	14.8 (58.6)	17.3 (63.1)	19.2 (66.6)	21.6 (70.9)	17.7 (63.9)
Daily mean °C (°F)	17.7 (63.9)	17.8 (64.0)	16.2 (61.2)	13.1 (55.6)	9.6 (49.3)	7.4 (45.3)	6.9 (44.4)	8.1 (46.6)	10.0 (50.0)	11.9 (53.4)	13.7 (56.7)	15.8 (60.4)	12.4 (54.2)
Mean daily minimum °C (°F)	11.6 (52.9)	11.7 (53.1)	10.4 (50.7)	7.4 (45.3)	4.4 (39.9)	2.6 (36.7)	2.0 (35.6)	3.3 (37.9)	5.1 (41.2)	6.5 (43.7)	8.2 (46.8)	9.9 (49.8)	6.9 (44.5)
Mean minimum °C (°F)	5.1 (41.2)	5.6 (42.1)	2.5 (36.5)	0.2 (32.4)	−2.3 (27.9)	−4.2 (24.4)	−4.5 (23.9)	−2.9 (26.8)	−1.3 (29.7)	−0.7 (30.7)	1.5 (34.7)	3.8 (38.8)	−5.3 (22.5)
Record low °C (°F)	1.3 (34.3)	1.4 (34.5)	−1.3 (29.7)	−1.5 (29.3)	−3.8 (25.2)	−5.6 (21.9)	−7.0 (19.4)	−5.0 (23.0)	−2.7 (27.1)	−1.6 (29.1)	−1.8 (28.8)	0.3 (32.5)	−7.0 (19.4)
Average rainfall mm (inches)	112 (4.4)	110 (4.3)	103 (4.1)	128 (5.0)	151 (5.9)	152 (6.0)	165 (6.5)	154 (6.1)	140 (5.5)	144 (5.7)	137 (5.4)	162 (6.4)	1,658 (65.3)
Source: Earth Sciences NZ (rainfall 1951–1980)

Climate data for Kinleith Mill (4km S of Tokoroa), elevation 383 m (1,257 ft), (1967–1990)
Month	Jan	Feb	Mar	Apr	May	Jun	Jul	Aug	Sep	Oct	Nov	Dec	Year
Record high °C (°F)	30.8 (87.4)	30.0 (86.0)	27.2 (81.0)	23.8 (74.8)	21.8 (71.2)	17.2 (63.0)	16.9 (62.4)	19.1 (66.4)	22.2 (72.0)	22.6 (72.7)	26.5 (79.7)	29.3 (84.7)	30.8 (87.4)
Mean maximum °C (°F)	27.3 (81.1)	26.9 (80.4)	24.6 (76.3)	21.4 (70.5)	17.6 (63.7)	15.4 (59.7)	14.5 (58.1)	15.4 (59.7)	17.4 (63.3)	20.4 (68.7)	23.1 (73.6)	25.1 (77.2)	27.9 (82.2)
Mean daily maximum °C (°F)	22.6 (72.7)	22.6 (72.7)	20.8 (69.4)	17.5 (63.5)	14.0 (57.2)	11.5 (52.7)	11.0 (51.8)	12.1 (53.8)	13.9 (57.0)	16.1 (61.0)	18.7 (65.7)	20.8 (69.4)	16.8 (62.2)
Daily mean °C (°F)	17.3 (63.1)	17.4 (63.3)	15.9 (60.6)	12.8 (55.0)	9.7 (49.5)	7.7 (45.9)	7.0 (44.6)	8.1 (46.6)	9.7 (49.5)	11.7 (53.1)	13.9 (57.0)	15.9 (60.6)	12.3 (54.1)
Mean daily minimum °C (°F)	12.0 (53.6)	12.1 (53.8)	10.9 (51.6)	8.1 (46.6)	5.4 (41.7)	3.8 (38.8)	2.9 (37.2)	4.0 (39.2)	5.6 (42.1)	7.1 (44.8)	9.1 (48.4)	10.9 (51.6)	7.7 (45.8)
Mean minimum °C (°F)	6.4 (43.5)	6.4 (43.5)	4.4 (39.9)	1.2 (34.2)	−0.9 (30.4)	−2.8 (27.0)	−2.8 (27.0)	−1.9 (28.6)	−0.6 (30.9)	1.3 (34.3)	2.8 (37.0)	4.7 (40.5)	−3.6 (25.5)
Record low °C (°F)	3.1 (37.6)	3.7 (38.7)	0.8 (33.4)	−2.0 (28.4)	−2.7 (27.1)	−6.7 (19.9)	−4.4 (24.1)	−3.5 (25.7)	−3.0 (26.6)	−2.6 (27.3)	−0.5 (31.1)	1.8 (35.2)	−6.7 (19.9)
Average rainfall mm (inches)	112.1 (4.41)	97.8 (3.85)	105.3 (4.15)	101.6 (4.00)	141.7 (5.58)	144.8 (5.70)	147.9 (5.82)	141.7 (5.58)	149.4 (5.88)	154.5 (6.08)	120.3 (4.74)	154.3 (6.07)	1,571.4 (61.86)
Source: Earth Sciences NZ (rainfall 1971–2000)

== Demographics ==
Stats NZ describes Tokoroa as a medium urban area which covers 15.65 km^{2} (6.04 sq mi). It had an estimated population of 14,500 as of June 2025, with a population density of 927 people per km^{2}.

Historical population
Year	Pop.	±% p.a.
2006	13,170	—
2013	12,336	−0.93%
2018	13,572	+1.93%
2023	14,001	+0.62%

Tokoroa had a population of 14,001 in the 2023 New Zealand census, an increase of 429 people (3.2%) since the 2018 census, and an increase of 1,665 people (13.5%) since the 2013 census. There were 6,918 males, 7,056 females, and 30 people of other genders in 4,917 dwellings. 2.3% of people identified as LGBTIQ+. The median age was 36.1 years (compared with 38.1 years nationally). There were 3,195 people (22.8%) aged under 15 years, 2,682 (19.2%) aged 15 to 29, 5,802 (41.4%) aged 30 to 64, and 2,319 (16.6%) aged 65 or older.

People could identify as more than one ethnicity. The results were 59.9% European (Pākehā); 46.6% Māori; 21.5% Pasifika; 4.9% Asian; 0.3% Middle Eastern, Latin American and African New Zealanders (MELAA); and 1.9% other, which includes people giving their ethnicity as "New Zealander". English was spoken by 96.5%, Māori by 10.2%, Samoan by 1.6%, and other languages by 6.6%. No language could be spoken by 2.4% (e.g. too young to talk). New Zealand Sign Language was known by 0.7%. The percentage of people born overseas was 13.2, compared with 28.8% nationally.

Religious affiliations were 30.4% Christian, 0.5% Hindu, 0.2% Islam, 3.4% Māori religious beliefs, 0.5% Buddhist, 0.5% New Age, and 1.2% other religions. People who answered that they had no religion were 54.7%, and 9.1% of people did not answer the census question.

Of those at least 15 years old, 993 (9.2%) people had a bachelor's or higher degree, 6,237 (57.7%) had a post-high school certificate or diploma, and 3,576 (33.1%) people exclusively held high school qualifications. The median income was $31,600, compared with $41,500 nationally. 600 people (5.6%) earned over $100,000 compared to 12.1% nationally. The employment status of those at least 15 was 4,647 (43.0%) full-time, 1,149 (10.6%) part-time, and 765 (7.1%) unemployed.

Individual statistical areas
Name	Area (km^{2})	Population	Density (per km^{2})	Dwellings	Median age	Median income
Paraonui	2.36	1,866	791	720	40.0 years	$36,600
Parkdale	2.54	888	350	315	40.2 years	$32,000
Matarawa	1.96	2,328	1,188	825	36.4 years	$28,700
Stanley Park	1.15	2,316	2,014	804	35.2 years	$29,600
Strathmore	1.25	2,505	2,004	825	33.9 years	$28,500
Tokoroa Central	4.70	1,032	220	396	40.1 years	$31,100
Moananui	1.68	3,066	1,825	1,029	34.3 years	$36,600
New Zealand					38.1 years	$41,500

=== Rural surrounds ===
Kinleith statistical area, which surrounds but does not include Tokoroa, covers 947.52 km^{2} (365.84 sq mi) and had an estimated population of 1,580 as of June 2025, with a population density of 1.7 people per km^{2}.

Historical populations for rural surrounds
Year	Pop.	±% p.a.
2006	1,113	—
2013	1,464	+3.99%
2018	1,446	−0.25%
2023	1,518	+0.98%

Kinleith had a population of 1,518 in the 2023 New Zealand census, an increase of 72 people (5.0%) since the 2018 census, and an increase of 54 people (3.7%) since the 2013 census. There were 819 males, 687 females, and 9 people of other genders in 579 dwellings. 1.6% of people identified as LGBTIQ+. The median age was 34.8 years (compared with 38.1 years nationally). There were 357 people (23.5%) aged under 15 years, 270 (17.8%) aged 15 to 29, 696 (45.8%) aged 30 to 64, and 192 (12.6%) aged 65 or older.

People could identify as more than one ethnicity. The results were 79.4% European (Pākehā); 23.7% Māori; 5.9% Pasifika; 9.5% Asian; 0.6% Middle Eastern, Latin American and African New Zealanders (MELAA); and 1.6% other, which includes people giving their ethnicity as "New Zealander". English was spoken by 96.2%, Māori by 4.0%, Samoan by 0.2%, and other languages by 8.5%. No language could be spoken by 2.4% (e.g. too young to talk). New Zealand Sign Language was known by 0.2%. The percentage of people born overseas was 17.2, compared with 28.8% nationally.

Religious affiliations were 31.8% Christian, 0.4% Hindu, 0.6% Islam, 1.2% Māori religious beliefs, 0.2% Buddhist, 0.4% New Age, and 3.2% other religions. People who answered that they had no religion were 56.9%, and 5.7% of people did not answer the census question.

Of those at least 15 years old, 159 (13.7%) people had a bachelor's or higher degree, 687 (59.2%) had a post-high school certificate or diploma, and 306 (26.4%) people exclusively held high school qualifications. The median income was $52,200, compared with $41,500 nationally. 153 people (13.2%) earned over $100,000 compared to 12.1% nationally. The employment status of those at least 15 was 693 (59.7%) full-time, 177 (15.2%) part-time, and 15 (1.3%) unemployed.

== Economy ==
The economic lifeblood of Tokoroa is forestry, centred at the nearby Kinleith Mill; and dairy farming. In 1995, Fonterra built the southern hemisphere's largest cheese factory in Lichfield, some 5 km north of the town. Due to increases in relative rates of return, large amounts of previously forested land were converted to farmland in the 2000s and 2010s.

The main agricultural activities of the district are sheep and dairy farming. Forestry is still, however, the primary and most important industry to the district. Timber is milled and processed at Kinleith. Over recent years, the sharp decline in timber processing has seen the majority of raw logs shipped offshore. Most of the Kinleith workers live in Tokoroa, with a small number commuting from other South Waikato towns. Tokoroa is a marketing and servicing centre for agriculture, inline with other associated industries. These other industries include (but are not limited to): the manufacture of cheese (and related dairy products [via Fonterra]), specialised wooden boxing, timber joinery, saw milling, general engineering, and the quarrying of building (masonry) stone.

Although Tokoroa's economy primarily tends to revolve around timber and farming, many large retail companies have continued investing in the town – Foodstuffs recently constructed and opened a New World (supermarket) on Tokoroa's main street (Bridge Street). Also, Woolworths (a major competitor to Foodstuffs Group) also recently built New Zealand's first Countdown (supermarket) featuring bilingual (i.e. including Te Reo-Māori) signage.

== Education ==
Tertiary education is important to Tokoroa, through Te Wānanga o Aotearoa and Toi Ohomai Institute of Technology.

Tokoroa has two secondary schools:

- Tokoroa High School, with a roll of 500 It opened in 1957.
- Forest View High School, with a roll of 425 It opened in 1974.

It has two alternative education facilities for secondary students who work better with full teacher guidance outside the classroom:

- Forest View High School Alternative Education Tautoko Kura
- Pa Harakeke Teen Parent Unit

There are three full Year 1 to 8 primary schools:

- Amisfield School, opened in 1956, with a roll of 139
- Tainui Full Primary School, with a roll of 249
- Te Kura Kaupapa Māori o Te Hiringa, a Māori immersion school with a roll of 135

There is one intermediate school:

- Tokoroa Intermediate, opened in 1962, with a roll of 277

Tokoroa also has a range of Year 1–6 primary schools:

- Bishop Edward Gaines Catholic School, with a roll of 49.
- Cargill Open Plan School, with a roll of 36.
- David Henry School, with a roll of 150.
- Strathmore School, opened in 1965, with a roll of 187.
- Tokoroa Central School, opened in 1954, with a roll of 191.
- Tokoroa North School, opened in 1967, with a roll of 415.

Matarawa Primary School opened in 1958 and closed in 1999. Tokoroa East School opened in 1915 and closed in 2010.

== Town facilities and attractions ==
Tokoroa has a number of Tourist and visiting attractions, as well as many facilities for local use.

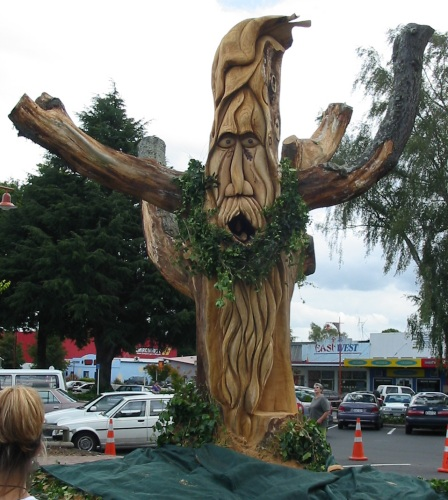
Tokoroa Greenman 'OZ'

=== Talking Poles ===
Since 1997, Tokoroa has been "sprouting" Talking Poles, consisting mainly of carvings representing ethnic culture, sports recreation, industry in the town and stories about the town. This one, photographed shortly after its unveiling in 2004, is a chainsaw carving of a deodar cedar which died from natural causes. It is representative of the Greenman in Welsh mythology and was, prior to 2018, located on State Highway 1, immediately adjacent to the town's information centre.

By October 2008, 42 Talking Poles were displayed around the town. Tokoroa Talking Poles symposium is convened every two years at the Tokoroa campus of Te Wananga o Aotearoa. The Greenman was carved in 2004 by Mr Andy Hankcock.

As part of the CBD Upgrade project, several of the town's Talking Poles were relocated next to where the existing 'Pine Man' sculpture stands in a central area between State Highway One and Leith Place. In 2018, the Greenman carving was relocated from its site to make way for this new development. Due to substantial rot discovered during this process, the Greenman was not re-installed. As of 2021 council has made arrangements to restore the sculpture.

=== Lake Moana-Nui ===
Tokoroa's man-made Lake Moana-Nui was created in the late 1970s for the community, involving excavation by large earthmoving equipment and a concrete dam wall with a drain valve control. A wooden bridge located on the south-west end of the dam wall that supported and controlled the drain valve was a favourite 'bomb' spot, and barefoot skiing down the spillway was early extreme sport unique to Tokoroa. During the 1970s, 'The Lake' was used extensively by youths and was referred to in local parlance as 'Tokoroa Beach'. On many summer afternoons, it was a common sight to see youth lying on the footpath across the road from the lake drying out after a swim.

In the period following the initial construction of the dam in the late 1970s, the lake began to deteriorate due to low rainfall and poor water flows, which saw lake weed overtake the swimming areas. The lake weed eventually became a drowning hazard that claimed the lives of swimmers over the preceding decade. In this sense, the project was a failure, and Lake Moana-Nui was considered unsafe. In an effort to control the problems, signs were erected banning access to the dam wall, and basic handrailing was put up to prevent public access. The lake was subject to regular draining in an effort to control the weed and to flush out the stale, stagnant water. While this did slightly improve the situation in the short term, people were warned not to swim in it. The lake is undergoing a major cleaning project so that it can be used in the future. To date (as at 25 April 2015), Lake Moana-Nui has been fully drained, refilled, and restored – and has been cleared by the local council for public recreation (as it was in its heyday during the 1970s and 80's).

There are picnic tables built around the lakes arc and there are four playgrounds. At the southern end of Lake Moana-Nui are gardens which were planted by a collective of Tokoroa school children.

=== Tokoroa Airfield ===
Tokoroa has an airfield with an 850m sealed runway. There are no scheduled air services. The site is often used for non-aircraft related reasons.

=== Town library ===
The current location of Tokoroa's library holds many historic memories for the locals – as it was previously the town's cinema. It currently holds a library with a full computer suite, over 2,000 books, a reference book section, and children's leisure area. It is located in the Tokoroa town centre.

=== Tokoroa Hospital ===
Tokoroa Hospital provides limited medical services for a population of approximately 22,800 people in the South Waikato District. Currently, the hospital provides 21 beds made up of a 17-bed inpatient ward and a 4-bed maternity ward. There is also a dedicated emergency department with capacity for five patients, and a fully functional theatre suite presently used for minor day surgery. Other facilities include x-ray and laboratory services, a cafe, a helipad for patient transfer, and various allied health services. District and public health nursing, diabetes nursing specialists, occupational therapy, physiotherapy, and health social work services are also based the hospital site, which also hosts clinics with various visiting specialists. The hospital site accommodates the Tokoroa Council of Social Services (an umbrella organisation of community services), and since 2014 has also hosted the town's GP practices, a pharmacy and several other health services in a modern health campus based at the hospital's former Ward 3.

== Culture and sports ==
Tokoroa hosts a number of sporting, cultural and music events every year including the Polynesian festival.

=== Polynesian Festival ===
Tokoroa Polynesian Festival occurs every year during September. Tokoroa's local schools and preschools give Samoan, Māori and Cook Islands performances, where you hear the Cook Island drumming and dancing and the Māori performing arts being displayed on the huge stage at the new South Waikato Events Centre, located at The Tokoroa Memorial Sports Ground. The 2009 event hosted NZ artists J.Williams and Erika.

=== Sports ===
Tokoroa being within the Waikato Province falls under the Waikato ITM Cup provincial catchment and the Chiefs Super Rugby franchise. The South Waikato district's netball associations also fall under the catchment for inclusion in the ANZ Championship, Waikato/BOP Magic franchise.

Over many decades, Tokoroa has been a natural base for strong, competitive woodchopping and sawing events. The axe long saw and chainsaw competitions, at the local A&P Shows, over many decades, have always been central to the local, timber and timber works culture of the town. As of 2018 the annual Tokoroa A&P show has been axed due to financial reasons.

=== Tokoroa Memorial Sports Ground ===
The sports ground is used every weekend and is in use throughout the weekdays. The Memorial Sports Ground includes:

- Eight full netball courts
- Eight full tennis courts
- Three full rugby fields
- Eight touch or rugby league fields
- One Soccer field
- One Rugby Union Club – Southern United Rugby Football Club (SURF)

=== Y.M.C.A Sports Centre ===
Tokoroa's Y.M.C.A hosts a number of indoor and outdoor events, such as:

- Indoor skating
- Outdoor Archery
- Indoor & Outdoor soccer (football)
- Basketball
- Netball
- Volleyball
- Indoor Hockey
- Dance classes

== Governance ==
=== Local government ===
Originally part of Matamata County, Tokoroa became a county town within Matamata County in 1953. In 1966, under the auspices of the Tokoroa Town Empowering Act, the town became a county borough within Matamata County, with its own borough committee and mayor. Tokoroa was constituted a borough in its own right in 1975. Local government remained under the auspices of the Tokoroa Borough Council until the 1989 local government reforms, when the borough amalgamated with Putaruru Borough and parts of Matamata County, to form the South Waikato District, with its seat in Tokoroa.

During the period from 1966 to 1989, Tokoroa had three mayors. The following is a complete list:

	Mayor	Portrait	Term of office	Notes
1	Jim Higgins		1966–1979	Appointed MBE in 1975
2	Michael Worth		1980–1983	Appointed MNZM in 2001
3	Jim Elder		1983–1989	

Since 1989, the South Waikato District Council has provided local governance services and amenities for Tokoroa.

=== Central government ===
Tokoroa is part of the Taupō electorate and has been represented by Louise Upston since 2008.

== Transportation ==
=== Cycling ===
Tokoroa has a number of cycleways which link the town centre with the outlying suburbs. These cycleways consist of a mixture of dedicated cycle lanes and mixed-use cycle/walk ways. There is an extensive cycleway from Browning Street, Tokoroa that leads to Kinleith which provides views of the town and the Kinleith mill.

=== State Highways and public roads ===
New Zealand's main arterial route, State Highway 1, runs through Tokoroa's eastern edge. Tokoroa is also accessible from the south-west via State Highway 32 (via Maraetai Road). Tokoroa is also a non-traffic light controlled zone.

Tokoroa is served by national bus (coachline) services such as Intercity (New Zealand) and Naked Bus, operating on various routes along State Highway 1.

=== Public transport ===
The Tokoroa Urban Connector bus service was established in June 2015, running a circuit route within Tokoroa, in addition to a district wide circuit connecting with Tīrau, Putāruru and Litchfield. Having previously been contracted to Go Bus, in October 2022 services were rebranded under the name South Waikato Urban Connector when Tranzit Coachlines were awarded a contract to run services. Current weekday routes servicing Tokoroa include the 30 Tokoroa Circuit, 31 District Connector and the 32 Tokoroa Connector. The 37 Tokoroa to Taupō services the town twice a week, providing a public transport connection to the town via Mangakino.

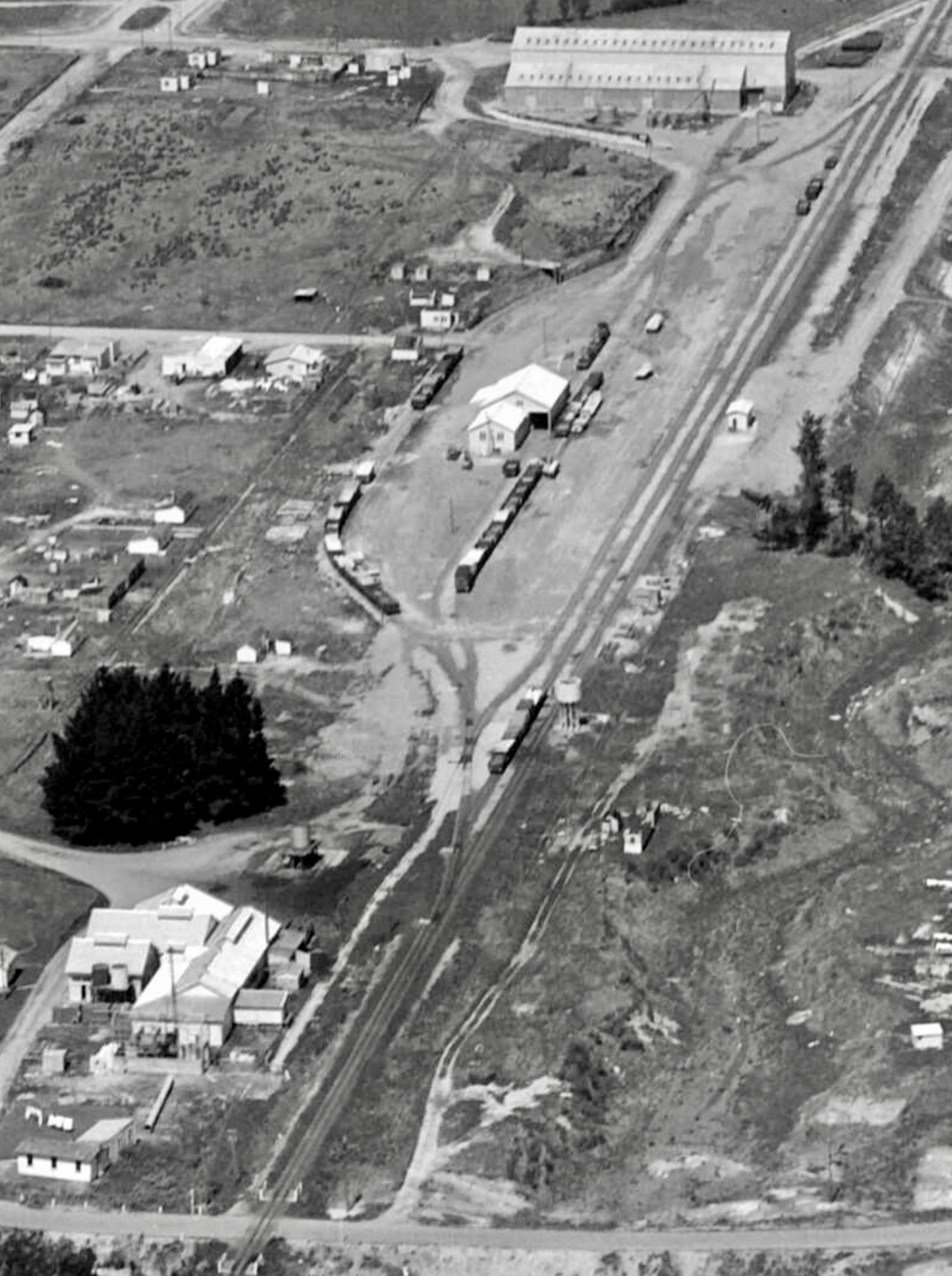
Tokoroa goods station in 1953

=== Railway ===
The Kinleith Branch line runs through Tokoroa on its route between Waharoa on the East Coast Main Trunk line, and its terminus at the Kinleith Mill to the south of the town. Most freight trains on the line travel between the Kinleith and the Port of Tauranga. The line was built in 1952, following closure of the TTT railway. Since then it has carried only freight traffic.

The main cargo, from Kinleith, used to include: raw and processed pulp; paper products; plywood, timber, and raw logs. With restructuring having taken its toll on processing at Kinleith, however, the predominant cargo is now raw and ring-barked logs; logs are destined for export to timber, pulp, and paper processing plants worldwide. 46 trains a week run on the branch.

A container terminal opened in 2015. The line has a 70 km/h (43 mph) speed limit, with a 25 km/h (16 mph) limit over the Wiltsdown Road crossing to the south.

==== Railway history, 1905 – 1946: TTT Railway ====
In the early 1900s the Taupo Totara Timber Company (TTT) acquired bush blocks north and north-west of Lake Taupō and erected a sawmill at Mokai. The company built a 51 miles (82 km) railway between its sawmilling centre at Mokai (near Taupō) and Putāruru, where it connected with the NZ Government Railway. The TTT line crossed the Tokoroa Plains, passing through the area that has become the town of Tokoroa.

The TTT railway opened in 1905 as a private carrier, carrying TTT staff and their families, guests, freight, and mail between Putāruru and Mokai. From January 29, 1908, the TTT Railway opened its freight and passenger services to the public.

==== Railway history after 1946: NZR Kinleith Branch ====
The NZ Government in October 1946 purchased a 19 miles (31 km) section of the TTT Railway, from Putāruru to the "19-Mile Peg", near the present-day location of the Kinleith Paper Mill. From Tuesday, 10 June 1947, the NZ Government took over the operation of this part of the TTT line.

The former TTT Railway ceased operations in 1949. As part of a Government scheme for the development of the Waikato River basin and surrounding areas, a line between Putāruru and Kinleith, built to NZR standards, was completed on 6 October 1952.

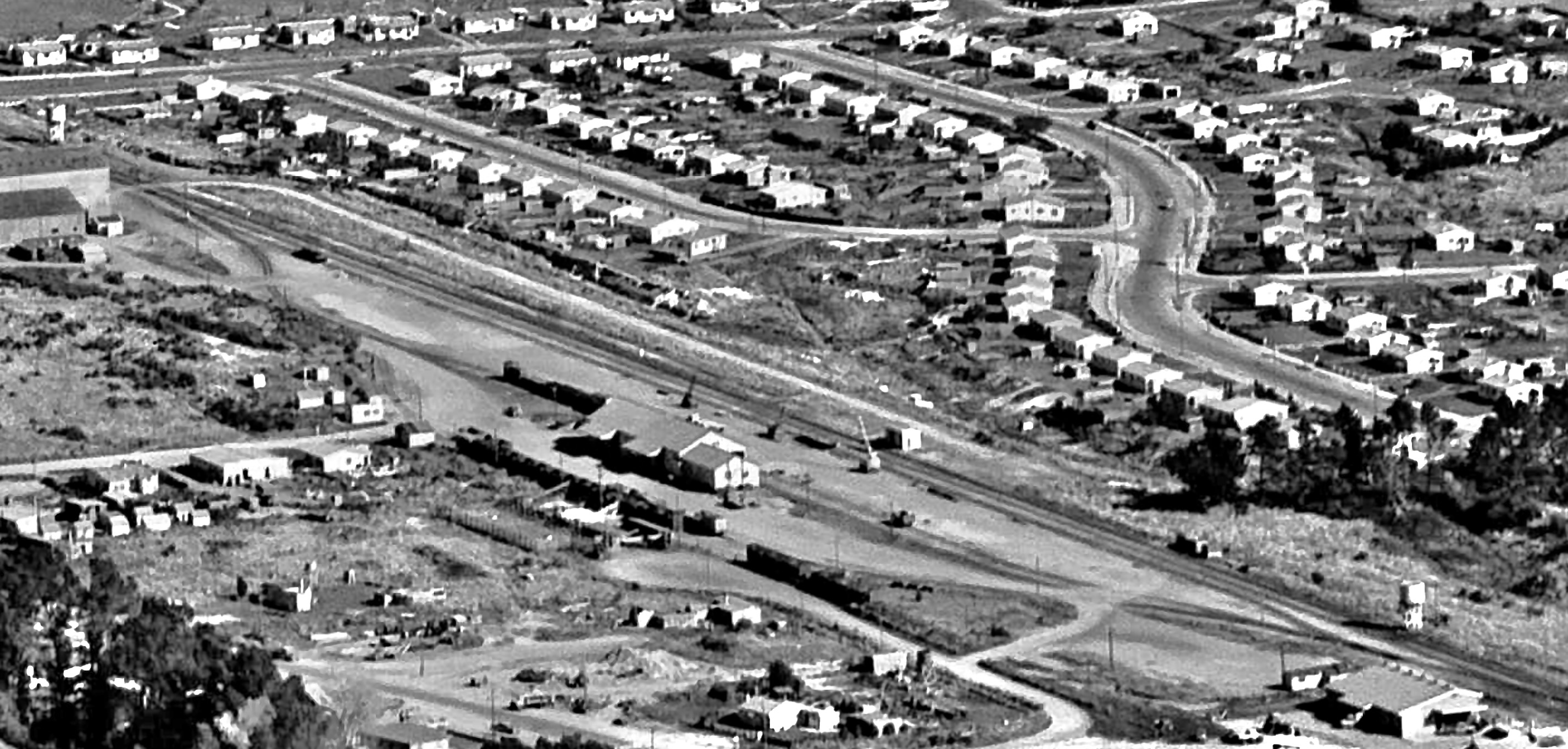
Tokoroa goods station in 1959

In 1946 the Tokoroa goods yard had a passing loop for 105 wagons and a siding to the Tokoroa Cheese Factory. By November 1947 formation work at Tokoroa was done. In 1950 ballast from Tamaki was laid, with sand from Ngāruawāhia ballast pit and in 1951, ballast from Drury. On Monday, 12 November 1951 the station yard was fully ballasted. The Lichfield-Tokoroa line had enough ballast for trains to start running at 15 mph (24 km/h), and sidings for 85, 69, 64, 45 wagons, 40 and 32 wagons.

A temporary 20 x 16 ft station office was moved from Lichfield. Approach roads were built and a goods shed, office and parcels room were being built. Water vats, with a capacity of 12,000 gallons a day, had concrete foundations, but totara for the staves was in short supply and hoop fasteners from Hillside and the outlet valves from Addington hadn't arrived. 4 railway houses were ready and 4 more almost complete. 6 more were added in 1955. The sidings were later filled with sand to facilitate shunting. The line to Kinleith was only able to take occasional loads of heavy plant using MoW locomotives. The Hydro-Electric Department had a store, with rail access, at the south end of the yard. The line to Kinleith was completed on 6 October 1952. An office and 60 x 40 ft through goods shed contract were completed on 3 March 1953 by F T Hawkins Ltd, Hamilton. It was extended in 1954 for about £6,600. Stockyards were added 1955 and extended in 1960. In 1968 a new 110 feet by 50 feet goods shed, with a 40 foot wide platform and office building were built.

In 1985 the station had a shelter shed, equipment building, low level platform and loading bank, goods shed and loading shelter. On 1 September 1990 it closed. On 6 February 1991 the goods shed and office were gutted by fire.

Only a passing loop remains.

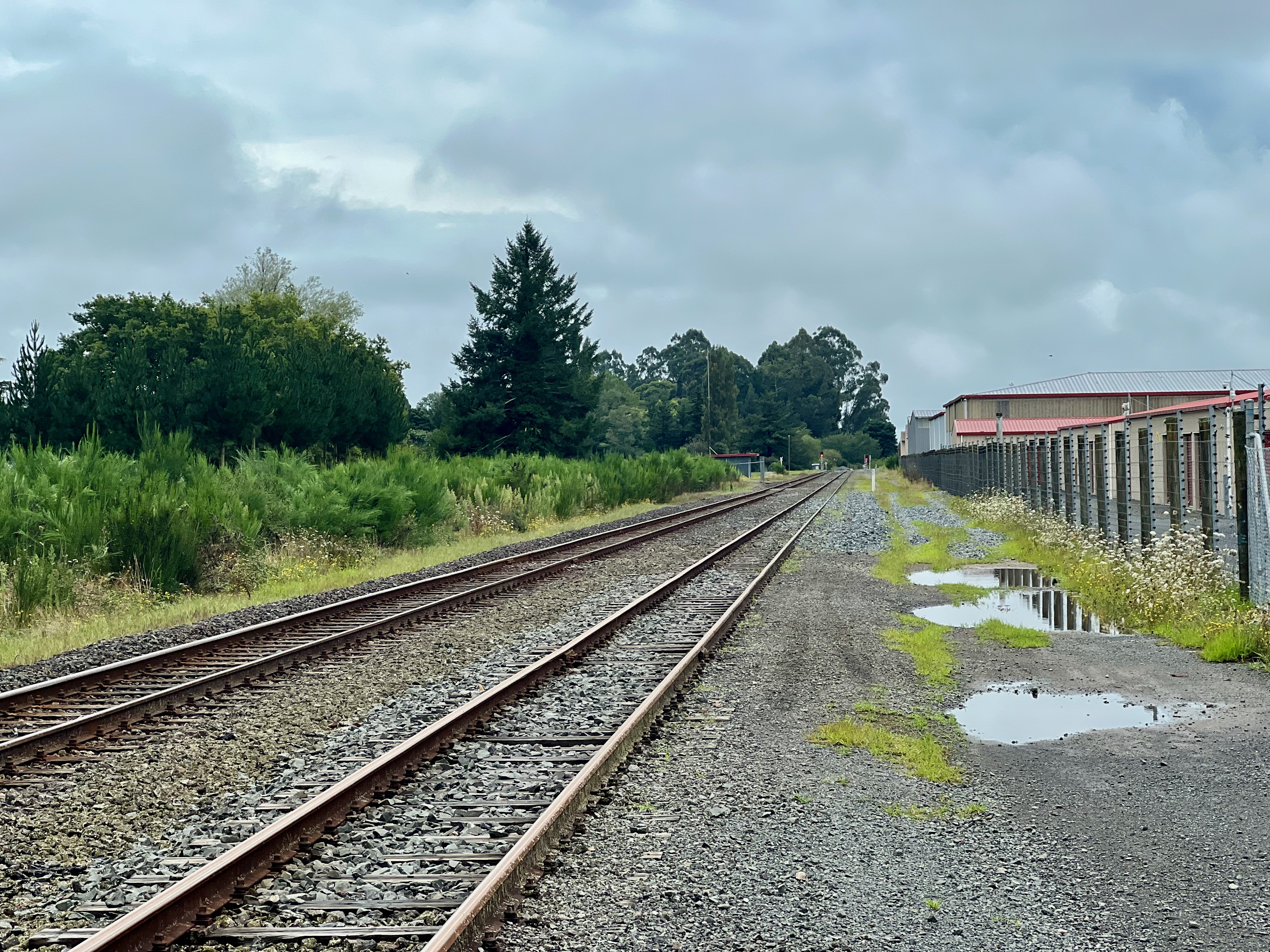
Tokoroa goods station site, looking north.

	Former adjoining stations	
Lichfield; Line open, station closed 12.89 km (8.01 mi)	Kinleith Branch	Kinleith; Line open, station closed 7.87 km (4.89 mi)

== Radio stations ==
There are several local radio stations in Tokoroa:

- Raukawa FM 90.9/95.7 MHz
- Cruise FM, locally owned community radio station broadcasting to Tokoroa 94.1FM, Mangakino-Whakamaru 104.4FM and Putaruru 107.7FM. Ph 07 88 66 939] 94.1 MHz
- Vision FM 88.5 MHz
- FRESH FM 88.3 MHz

As well as local repeaters of national radio stations – including the former site of Radio Forestland, 1ZO (1413 kHz, AM/MB):

- Radio New Zealand National 729 kHz/101.3 MHz
- Newstalk ZB 1413 kHz
- Radio Rhema 99.7 MHz
- The Hits 97.3 MHz

== Notable people ==
- Isaac Boss – honours: Hautapu RFC, Waikato RFC (NPC), Ireland rugby union International
- Pero Cameron – NZ Basketball rep' (Honours: Auckland and Waikato NBL Teams; Coach of Wellington Saints NBL Championship Team, 2010; NZ Tall Blacks)
- Adrian Cashmore – honours: Auckland RFC (NPC), Auckland Blues, NZ All Blacks [2 Tests]
- Quade Cooper – Australian rugby union player (honours: Queensland Reds, Wallabies)
- John Davies – teacher, public relations representative, Bronze medal-winning athlete (1964 Summer Olympics), and athletics coach
- Stella Duffy – Novelist
- Ian Foster – New Zealand All Blacks Rugby Coach
- Ben Hana – Wellington identity: better known as "Blanket Man" (deceased)
- Tommy Hayes – Cook Islands rugby union representative
- Isaac John – honours: New Zealand Warriors, Wakefield Trinity (UK), Penrith Panthers, Cook Islands Rugby League, New Zealand Kiwis
- Richard Kahui – honours: Waikato RFC (NPC), Highlanders, Waikato/BOP Chiefs, NZ All Blacks [17 Tests]
- Bob Kerr – author, artist and illustrator
- Paul Koteka (Tohoa Tauroa Paul ("Bam Bam") Koteka) – Honours: Tokoroa HSOB RFC, Pirates RFC, NZ Juniors, Waikato RFC (NPC), NZ Māori, NZ All Blacks [2 Tests], Western Australia RFC (93 caps; later Captain of WA State Team)
- Nicky Little – International honours: Fiji Rugby Union representative (nephew of Walter Little)
- Walter Little – honours: North Harbour RFC, Waikato/BOP Chiefs, Auckland Blues, NZ All Blacks [50 Tests]
- Kendrick Lynn – rugby union player
- Sean Maitland – honours: NZ U-20 Rugby Union Team (World Cup Champions), Canterbury Crusaders, Glasgow Warriors, Scotland
- Joseph Manu – honours: Junior Kiwis (2015) and NRL Sydney Roosters (2016–), Back to Back NRL Grand Final Winner 2018 / 2019
- Keven Mealamu – honours: Auckland RFC, Auckland Blues, Waikato/BOP Chiefs, NZ All Blacks [123 Tests]
- Jenny Morris – New Zealand/Australian singer/songwriter, The Crocodiles; Models and INXS
- Henry Paul – New Zealand (Kiwis) rugby league representative
- Robbie Paul – New Zealand (Kiwis) rugby league representative
- Jordan Rakei – neo-soul singer based in London
- The Politicians – rock/new wave/reggae band formed in 1981 by Tim Armstrong.
- Sir Paul Reeves – Anglican priest, Archbishop, diplomat, former Governor-General of New Zealand
- Dallas Seymour – All Black
- Bruce Simpson – blogger and jet-engine experimenter
- Brian Tamaki – founder of Destiny Church
- Zane Tetevano – honours: Newcastle Knights RL (2011), Cook Islands Rugby league Representative, Sydney Roosters, NRL Grand Final Winner 2018
- Maria Tutaia – New Zealand netball representative (honours: Waikato/BOP Magic, Northern Mystics, Silver Ferns)
- Monique Williams – New Zealand sprinter (honours: selection at NZ representative levels)
- Royce Willis – honours: BOP RFC, Waikato RFC, Auckland Blues, Waikato/BOP Chiefs, NZ All Blacks [12 Tests]
- Tamatha Paul – Green Party Member of Parliament for Wellington Central.

== Notes and references ==
- Reed, A. W. (2002). The Reed Dictionary of New Zealand Place Names. Auckland: Reed Books. ISBN 0-7900-0761-4.
