= Fun Ho! Toys =

New Zealand toy brand

Fun-Ho! Toys were a brand of diecast toy cars and trucks manufactured and distributed by Underwood Engineering Co. Ltd. of Inglewood, New Zealand. Production was started by Jack Underwood about 1935 and continued until 1982. Since this time reproductions have been made also in Inglewood (Taranaki) at the Fun Ho! Toys Museum. Currently toys are occasionally cast as museum memorabilia using original molding plates and boxes. The name was always portrayed with the exclamation following Fun Ho!

== Early years ==
The earliest Fun Ho! race cars made in the late 1930s were mostly generic midget, sprint, and salt flat cars of simple casting with two axles, and four rubber wheels (sometimes the rubber was white). The first cars were made out of lead. Most of the cars had a driver that was part of the casting. Only a couple, like the Cooper and Mercedes Streamliner were replicas of real cars.

Early diecast Fun Ho! cars were a Ford Model A, a 1949 Ford, a Packard Roadster, an Austin Healey 100, a Studebaker saloon, a Humber Hawk, an MG TD roadster, a Jaguar XK 120 convertible and coupe, the above-mentioned Mercedes Streamliner and an interesting early 1950s 'High Boy' hot rod that looks suspiciously like the design that Auburn Rubber toys used in their inventory. A caravan house trailer was also available. A Morestone-like motorcycle with sidecar and single motorcycle with rider were also offered.

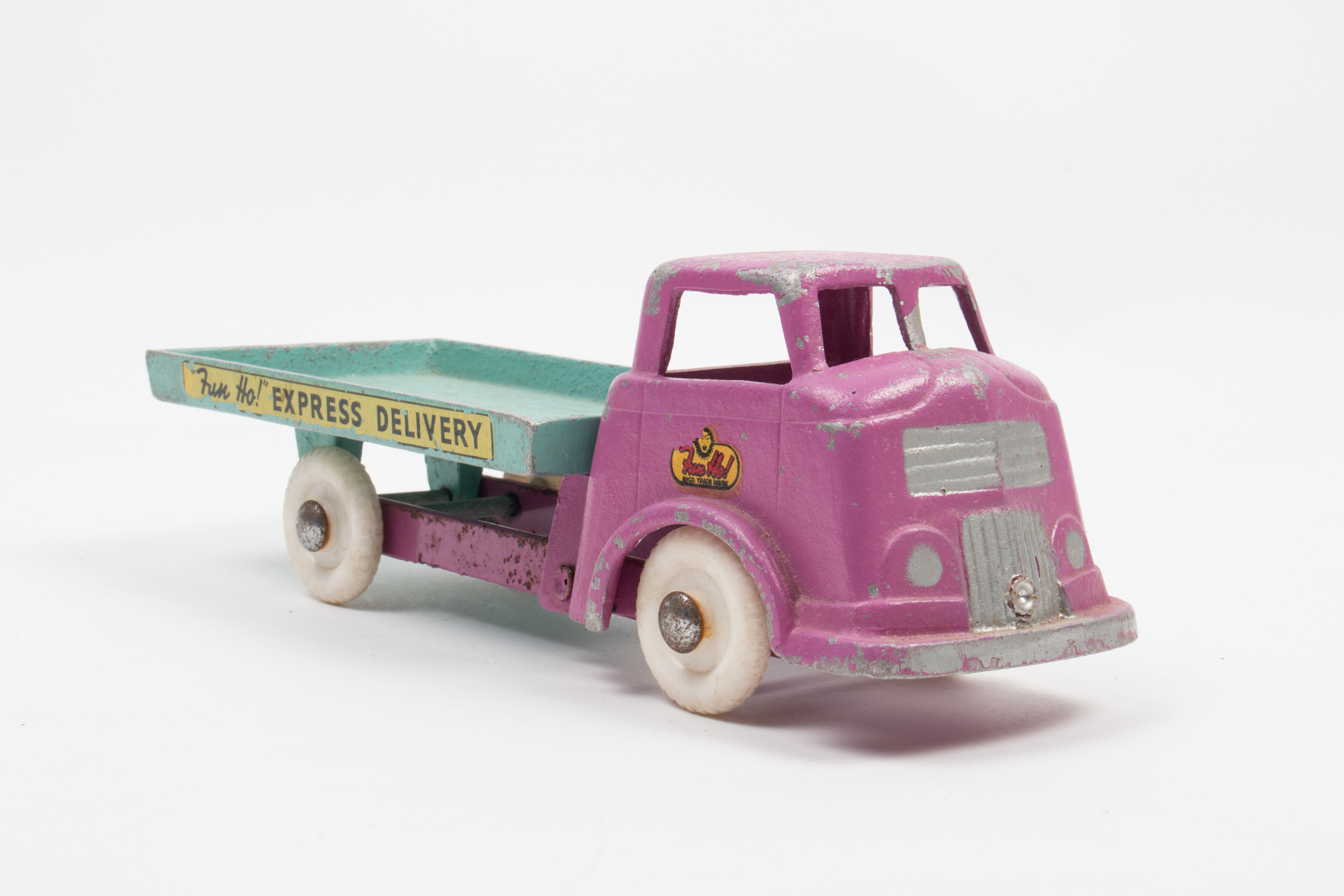
Flat deck truck toy manufactured by Fun Ho! Toys, 1955-1973

A couple of tractors were also offered and more were added into the 1950s. Again, some were generic while newer models were a Fordson, a Massey Harris, a couple of Fergusons, and a swept fender Oliver. A few farm implements, like a disc harrow, plow, and trailers were made. A number of fire engines were also offered, along with a number of trucks, buses and construction vehicles. There were also a couple of fighter aircraft and a train with several cars.

Most vehicles were of a small 'Matchbox' or 'Tootsietoy' size, but a few were larger 'Tonka' like dump trucks, tractors and other construction vehicles.

Typical of an early diecasting firm, also made were sundry diecast buildings, road signs, doll house furniture pieces and yard working shovels, pitchforks, rakes and other implements. Some of the larger toys and doll house accessories were apparently tooling from Tri-Ang of England as the Tri-Ang name appears with the clown and Fun Ho! logo on some toys.

One interesting aspect in the casting of Fun Ho! toys is that when a changeover from lead was made, the logical industry choice of zamac or similar zinc alloy was passed up and most Fun Ho! toys are made of aluminum.

== Matchbox and Budgie tooling ==
The Fun Ho! Midget Scale Model series was introduced in the mid 1960s with other models introduced later by Underwood into the 1970s. Though through the years, Fun Ho! made over 250 different models, there were at least 60 models in the Midget series. The new line was based on the acquisition of the tooling for nine existing models that were made in Melbourne, Australia, in the late 1950s by Streamlux. Streamlux sold the tooling to Fun Ho! in 1962. These models included a tractor, Holden FE sedan, VW bug, BOAC double deck bus, VW Transporter, Austin tipper truck and tanker, and a simply cast Mercedes Streamliner, These models formed the backbone of Fun Ho!'s Midget Scale Model Series.

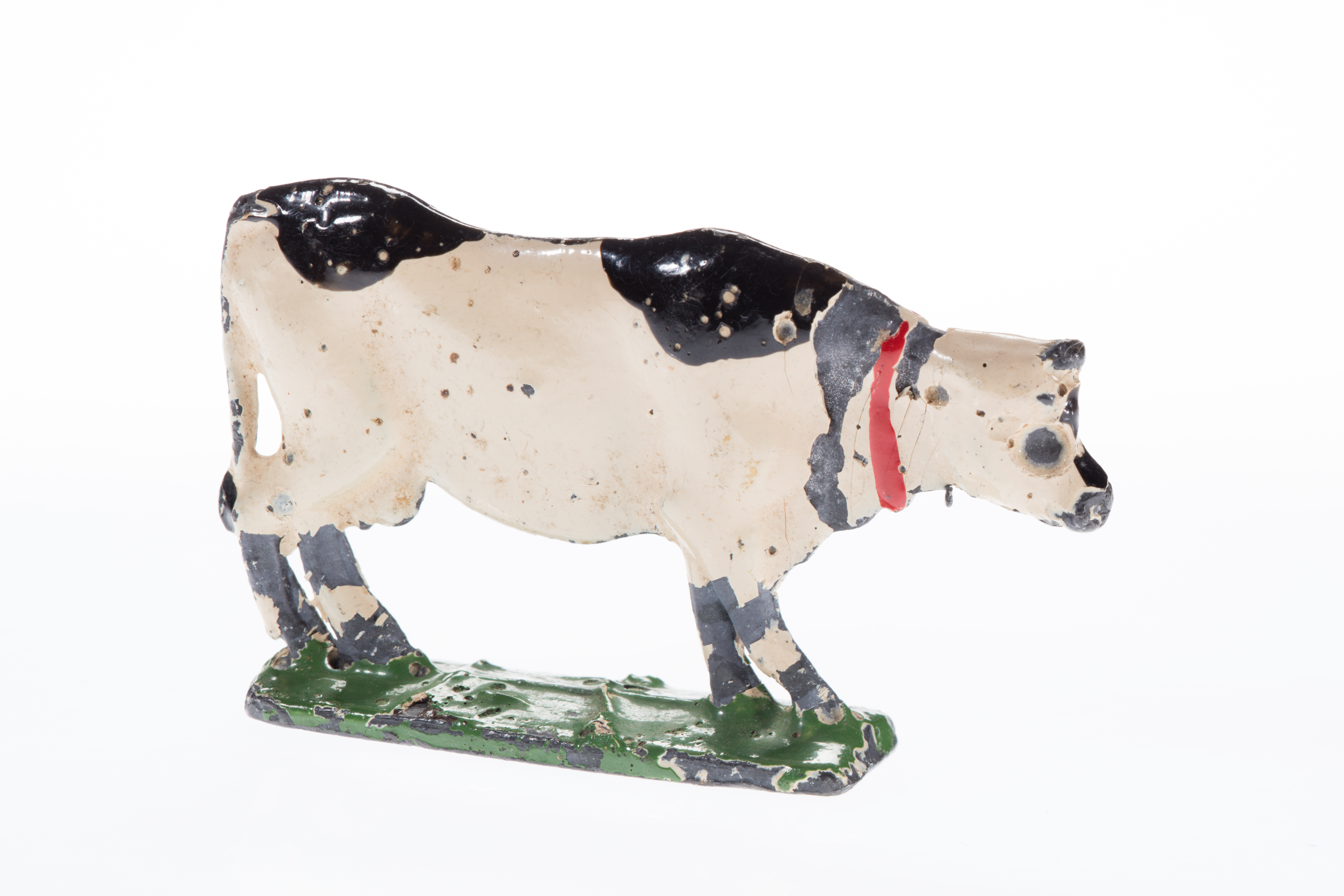
Toy animal manufactured by Fun Ho! Toys, 1935-1949

Later, Fun Ho! introduced several new models. At first glance these appear to be dies from both English Lesney and Budgie Toys, but not-so-close inspection shows the Midget Models to be much more crude and, in many cases, smaller, than the original models from those companies. At least 15 models seem similar enough to former Matchbox (brand) models to eliminate the possibility of coincidence. Some of these are: the 1964 Chevrolet Impala (née 'taxi' as a Matchbox), Dodge wreck truck, Jaguar XKE, Jaguar Mk. 10, Ford Zephyr, Morris pickup truck, Scammell dump truck (sans plow), Merryweather Marquis fire engine, and the bulldozer and excavator.

Cars were very simply cast, and rather austere. They had neither windows nor interiors, whether plastic or metal. The only exceptions were on a couple of models like the MGB where metal seats protruded into the interior, but only as part of the casting of the chassis.

Several other trucks and buses were also seen and may have been Budgies in spirit if not in actual tooling. A Hillman Imp and several articulated trucks are very similar to previous British Budgie offerings.

The origin of the tooling of a few Holden models and other Utes is uncertain, as was the inclusion of the MGB which is not seen elsewhere in 'Matchbox' size. Two different car trailers and a farm trailer were offered. Several of the Midget series including the Road Roller, two different Excavators, and Road Grader were offered in dark green military colors along with a Jeep, Half-track and trailer. Other models were sold in Fire Service gift sets and painted all in red.

For a time, some Midget models were used as promotional models for Mobil Gas, and recognizable by their red and white boxes. These were packaged similar to regular Midgets but called "Mobil Midget Models" and displaying a Mobil gas pump on boxes and instruction sheet.

Some dies later arrived in Australia and were produced under the name Message Models. These were apparently the Jaguar Mk 10, Ford Thames Ute, Holden HR Ute, Holden HR sedan, and Chevrolet Bel Air.

== Marketing and packaging ==
The logo for the company showed Fun Ho! in a script like form within an oval that included an odd portrait of a clown-like face that looks kind of like a laughing child with a beanie cap...or...a yelling oriental martial arts specialist. The riddle is solved when looking at a company catalog (leaflet) that zooms out showing a clown complete with ruffles and a tall pointed hat and carrying a Fun Ho! sign. The clown was most often printed in red, and was even used for company Christmas cards once upon a time. The logo was probably OK from the 1930s through the 1960s, but as an advertising gimmick, the design would probably would not work well with children today.

Some of the early cars and trucks were offered in plastic bags stapled to attached red cardboard pegboard-punched hangers marked with the Fun Ho! logo.

Midget Toy boxes were very similar to earlier British Budgie Toys with red and yellow alternate colors on sides – and also in that the Midget Toys logo was portrayed in 'portrait' style with box stood on end. The box ends were red and had a line drawing illustration of the vehicle inside with model number. Boxes said "New Zealand made" on the sides. Some later boxes had plastic windows. The Mobil Gas Midget Series boxes were decorated similar to the yellow and red ones – but these were colored red and white.

== Cessation and the Museum Factory ==
Into the early 1970s, Fun Ho! produced up to one million vehicles a year. By the late 1970s, however, import substitution practices supporting national production changed and more toys were imported from abroad. These American Hot Wheels, English Matchbox Toys, and Japanese Tomicas, among other brands had windows, plastic interiors, opening features and various figures or animals which accompanied the models. The writing was on the wall, the pressures of competition increased, and Fun Ho! toy production ceased in 1982. The factory officially closed in 1987.

Sometime after the closing of the factory, The Fun Ho! Toys Museum opened in Inglewood. The museum displays all models produced between the years 1935-1982, which is the toy-making period of Underwood Engineering Co. The toy making part of the museum goes by the name of the Fun Ho! National Toy Museum Foundry, where Richard Jordan makes toys on site using original Fun Ho! molding plates.
