= Isaac John =

Cook Islands and New Zealand international rugby league footballer

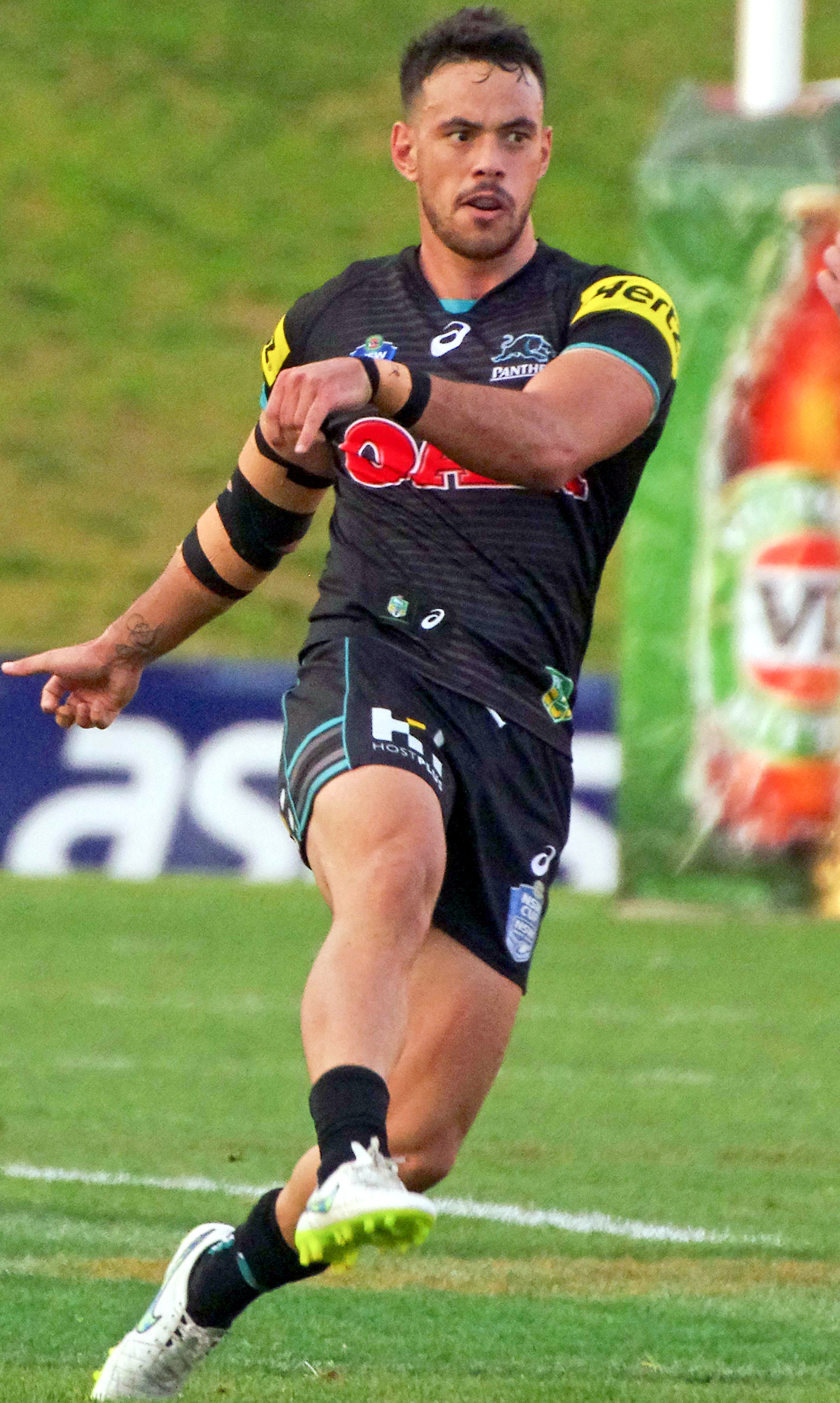

Personal information
- Born: 12 December 1988 (age 37) Tokoroa, New Zealand
- Height: 183 cm (6 ft 0 in)
- Weight: 90 kg (14 st 2 lb)

Playing information
- Position: Five-eighth, Halfback
Club
Years	Team	Pld	T	G	FG	P
2009–11	New Zealand Warriors	9	1	0	1	5
2012	Wakefield Trinity Wildcats	14	2	19	0	46
2013–15	Penrith Panthers	26	5	0	0	20
	Total	49	8	19	1	71
Representative
Years	Team	Pld	T	G	FG	P
2012–17	Cook Islands	5	2	3	0	14
2014	New Zealand	1	0	0	0	0
- Source: As of 4 November 2015

Isaac John (born 12 December 1988) is a former professional rugby league footballer who previously played for the Mount Pritchard Mounties in the Intrust Super Premiership. A Cook Islands and New Zealand international representative, he played as a five-eighth and halfback and previously played for the New Zealand Warriors and Penrith Panthers in the National Rugby League, and the Wakefield Trinity Wildcats in the Super League.

== Background ==
John was born in Tokoroa, New Zealand. He is of Cook Island descent.

== Early years ==
John was Educated at Forest View High School in Tokoroa. He first played league for local club the Pacific Sharks and the Turangawaewae team in the Ngāruawāhia Māori rugby league competition. He then played for the Waicoa Bay Stallions in the Bartercard Cup before being signed by the New Zealand Warriors. In 2004 John played for the New Zealand under-16 side and in 2006 John played for the Junior Kiwis. John signed with the New Zealand Warriors in 2007 as an eighteen-year-old. In 2007 he appeared in the NSWRL Premier League for the Auckland Lions as well as playing for the Stallions in the Bartercard Cup. In 2008 he played for the Junior Warriors in the inaugural Toyota Cup and Otahuhu Leopards in the Auckland Rugby League competition. John finished his Toyota Cup career with twenty five appearances, scoring eleven tries, one goal and four field goals.

== Business ==
John currently is the creative director and co-owner of the clothing brand YKTR (You Know The Rules) which was founded in 2016 with former Brisbane Broncos player James Segeyaro and St George Illawarra Dragons player Corey Norman, and the trio went on to form another business named YKTR Sports in 2019. He also started the podcast The Ice Project in 2019.

== Playing career ==
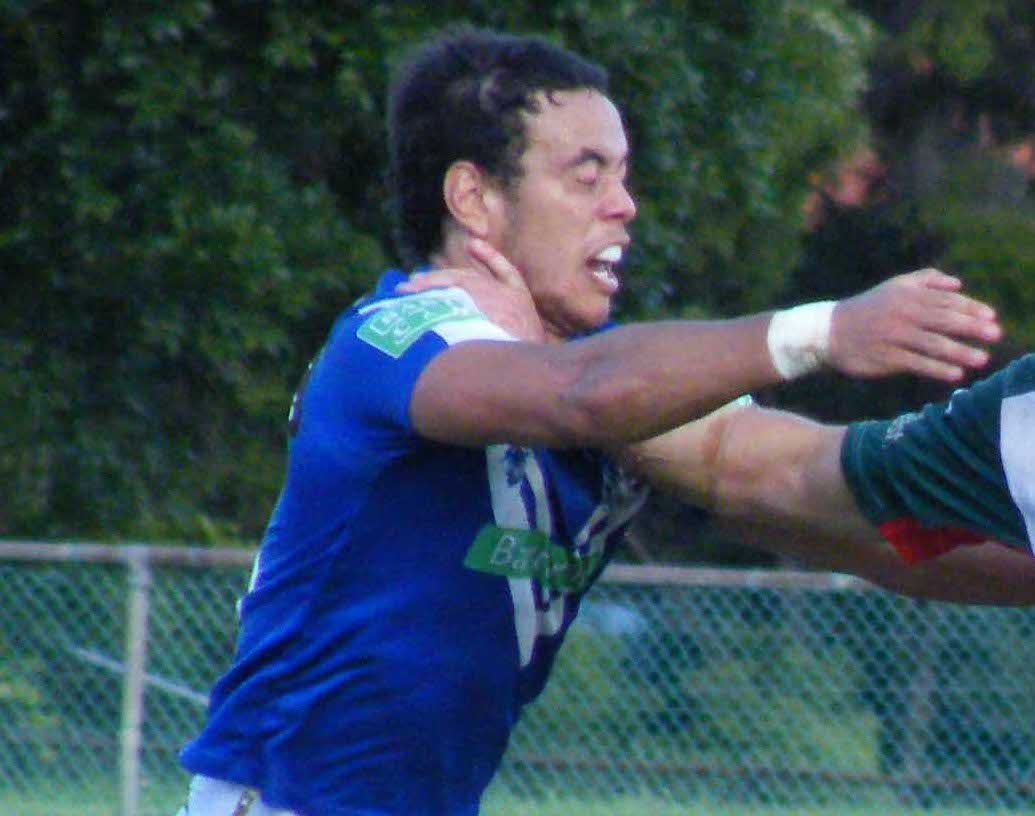
John playing for the Auckland Vulcans in 2009

=== 2009 ===
In 2009 John joined the senior New Zealand Warriors squad full-time and played for the Auckland Vulcans in the NSW Cup and Howick Hornets in the Auckland Rugby League competition. In mid-2009 the Warriors announced they had re-signed John until the end of the 2011 season with an option for 2012. In Round 19 of 2009 NRL season, John made his first grade début for the New Zealand Warriors against the Sydney Roosters at SFS at five-eighth in the Warriors 30–24 win. John played in three matches for the Warriors in his début year in the NRL in the 2009 NRL season.

=== 2010 ===
In Round 13 against the St. George Illawarra Dragons at Mt Smart Stadium, John scored his first NRL career try in the Warriors 22–20 loss. John played in five matches, scored one try and kicked 1 field goal for the Warriors in the 2010 NRL season.

=== 2011 ===
John played in one match for the New Zealand Warriors in the 2011 NRL season in Round 2 against the Wests Tigers in a 20–12 loss at Leichhardt Oval. On 29 October 2011 John signed a three-year contract with Wakefield Trinity. John mostly played in the NSW Cup, playing in the Auckland Vulcans 30–28 loss to Canterbury-Bankstown Bulldogs in the 2011 NSW Cup Grand Final. In 2011 John was named in the Cook Islands side but the Test was cancelled by the New Zealand Rugby League.

=== 2012 ===
John played in 14 matches, scored 1 try and kicked 19 goals for the Wildcats in the 2012 Super League season. John was released from the club at the start of the 2013 season. John played for the Cook Islands in the 28–24 victory over Lebanon.

=== 2013 ===
On 25 February 2013, John signed with the Penrith Panthers on a one-year contract. John spent the early parts of the season playing for the Penrith feeder side, Windsor Wolves, before making his Penrith club début in Round 9 against the Melbourne Storm in Penrith's 12–10 victory at Penrith Stadium. In his next match in Round 10 against his former club the New Zealand Warriors at Penrith Stadium, John scored a hat trick in the Penrith club's 62–6 rampaging win. On 14 June 2013, John re-signed with Penrith on a new two-year contract. John finished the 2013 NRL season with him playing in 16 matches and scoring 5 tries for the Penrith side. John represented the Cook Islands in the 2013 World Cup, playing in all 3 matches at halfback and scoring a try in the tournament.

=== 2014 ===
In February 2014, John was selected in the Panthers inaugural 2014 Auckland Nines squad. John played in only three of the first eight matches, being behind Jamie Soward and Peter Wallace in the halves selection. John was a shock selections for the New Zealand national rugby league team test team squad against the Australia Kangaroos in the 2014 Anzac Test after Kieran Foran, Thomas Leuluai and Josh Hoffman were ruled out with injuries. Originally selected at five eighth, John was shifted to the interchange bench to have Tohu Harris to start at five-eighth, having John to début off the bench in the Kiwis 30–18 loss at SFS. A week after making his international début for New Zealand, John has had his season cut short by suffering a season ending anterior cruciate ligament (ACL) knee injury while going down in a tackle in Penrith's NSW Cup win over the Newcastle Knights. John finished off the Panthers 2014 NRL season with him playing in three matches and scoring a try.

=== 2015 ===
On 24 January, John was named in Penrith's 2015 Auckland Nines squad, but failed to make any impact. In November, he signed a one-year contract with the Manly-Warringah Sea Eagles starting in 2016.

=== 2016 ===
In 2016, John signed with the Manly-Warringah Sea Eagles, but again failed to make any impact, again not being picked to play. He played in the Auckland Nines but didn't play an NRL Game that season

=== 2017 ===
In 2017, Mount Pritchard Mounties recruited John to play "park footy" expecting him to play in the NSW lower grades, Ron Massey Cup & even below. Instead John would turn out for their NSW Cup side for the season, failing to make any impact. This was John's last season of competitive rugby league.
