= Sina Greenwood =

New Zealand mathematician

Sina Ruth Greenwood is a New Zealand mathematician whose interests include continuum theory, discrete dynamical systems, inverse limits, set-valued analysis, and Volterra spaces. She is an associate professor of mathematics and Associate Dean Pacific in the faculty of science at the University of Auckland.

== Education and career ==
Greenwood's parents emigrated from Samoa to Whanganui in New Zealand, shortly before Greenwood was born; they moved from there to Auckland when she was a child. She earned a bachelor's degree at the University of Auckland, and after some time in Australia became a secondary school teacher in Auckland.

Returning to the University of Auckland for graduate study in mathematics, she earned a master's degree and then completed her PhD in 1999, under the joint supervision of David Gauld and David W. Mcintyre. Her dissertation was Nonmetrisable Manifolds. She and three other students who finished their doctorates at the same time became the first topologists to earn a doctorate at Auckland.

After postdoctoral research, funded by a New Zealand Science and Technology Post-Doctoral Fellowship, she obtained a permanent position at the University of Auckland as a lecturer in 2004, later becoming an associate professor. Beyond mathematics, her work at the university has also included advocating for the interests of Pasifika and Māori students.

== Recognition ==
Greenwood is a Fellow of the New Zealand Mathematical Society, elected in 2018.
