= Lauren Burgess =

New Zealand rugby union player

- Born: 24 November 1986 (age 39) New Plymouth, New Zealand
- Height: 1.76 m (5 ft 9 1/2 in)
- School: Inglewood High School
- Notable relative: Erika Burgess (sister)
- Occupation: Physical education teacher.

Rugby union career
- Position: Centre
Provincial / State sides
Years	Team	Apps	(Points)
2012	Manawatu		
2013–	Taranaki		
National sevens team
Years	Team		Comps
2012–	New Zealand 7s		

Lauren Burgess (born 24 November 1986 in New Plymouth, New Zealand) is a New Zealand rugby union player. She plays in the Centre position for the Manawatu Cyclones, and for New Zealand's national women's sevens team.

== Rugby union career ==
Her transition back to rugby was with the Stratford club, after they decided to field a team in the Manawatu club competition. It didn't take long for her talent to be recognised - she was selected in the Manawatu rep side as a midfielder before a back injury sidelined her for the season.

She came back strongly and set her sights on making the national women's sevens squad. After being identified as a long-term prospect, she attended several training camps before being named in the squad to travel to Dubai for the inaugural IRB women's world series tournament.

Burgess was then selected and named captain in the Taranaki women's sevens side to compete in a regional tournament in Palmerston North. She was also one of three Taranaki representatives who had been selected in the New Zealand Go4Gold programme set up to identify potential talent ahead of the Rio Olympics in 2016.

== Netball career ==
Lauren Burgess
Personal information

Netball career
- Playing positions: WD, WA, C
Years	Club team	Apps
?–2007	Western Flyers	
2008	Central Pulse	
2009	Southern Steel	
- Updated on 15 March 2010

Together with older sister Erica, Burgess excelled at netball from the outset, moving through the representative grades at high school before eventually being named captain of the New Zealand secondary schools squad in 2004, a side that contained such illustrious names as Maria Tutaia and Cathrine Latu.

From there the midcourter became a regular fixture in the now defunct Western Flyers in the National Bank Cup, before being signed with the Central Pulse for the inaugural season of the ANZ Championship. After the Pulse failed to win a game in 2008, the team roster was overhauled and she was not signed for the 2009 season. Burgess nevertheless received a call-up to the Southern Steel bench in Round 2 that year as a temporary replacement for the injured Megan Hutton.
