= Isaac Boss =

Ireland international rugby union player

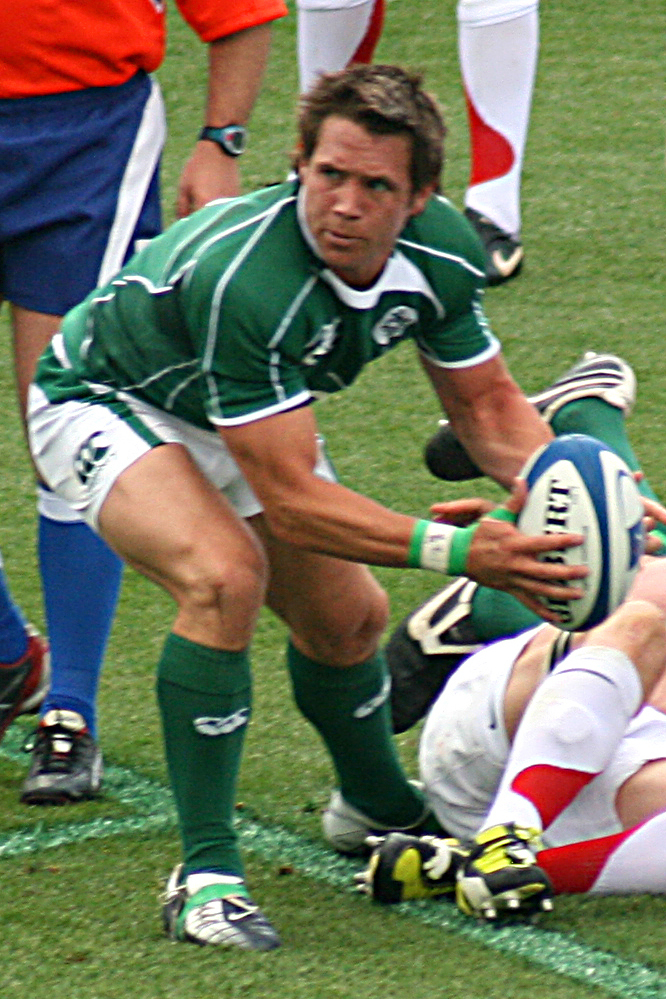
- Boss playing for Ireland's 'A' team in the 2009 Churchill Cup
- Born: Isaac Boss; 9 April 1980 (age 46) Tokoroa, New Zealand
- Height: 5 ft 10 in (1.78 m)
- Weight: 13 st 12 lb (88 kg)

Rugby union career
- Position(s): Scrum-half, fullback
Provincial / State sides
Years	Team	Apps	(Points)
1999–2005	Waikato	52	
2005–2010	Ulster	108	(60)
2010–2016	Leinster	133	(70)
2016	Waikato	4	(5)
- Correct as of 16 October 2016
Super Rugby
Years	Team	Apps	(Points)
2001–2004	Chiefs	21	(15)
2005	Hurricanes	11	(5)
International career
Years	Team	Apps	(Points)
1999	New Zealand U19		
2008–2015	Ireland Wolfhounds	16	(15)
2006–2015	Ireland	22	(15)
- Correct as of 31 January 2020
Coaching career
- Years: Team
- 2018: Southern United RFC
- 2020–: King Country Rams

Isaac Boss (born 9 April 1980, in Tokoroa, New Zealand) is a New Zealand–born Irish rugby union former player. His grandmother was born in Glenarm, County Antrim, thereby qualifying him to play for Ireland.

He played scrum-half or fullback and has played for Leinster, Ulster and the Ireland national team. He weighs 88 kg and is 1.78 m tall. He is the only player to play over 100 games for two different Irish provinces.

Boss retired from professional rugby after the 2016 Pro14 season with Leinster, returning home to New Zealand.

== Club career ==
Boss played in New Zealand for the Hautapu Rugby Club in Cambridge and for the Waikato in the National Provincial Championship. He also played for the Hurricanes and the Chiefs in the Super 12, where he was halfback for the Chiefs before the arrival of All Black Byron Kelleher.

=== Ulster Rugby ===
Boss arrived in Ireland joining Ulster at the beginning of the 2005-06 season. He was a key part of the 2005-06 Pro12 winners team. He played 16 matches for Ulster in the 2005-06 season, scoring 3 tries. The next season, he played 16 matches scoring 2 tries. He played 15 matches in 2007-08 scoring 3 tries. He scored 3 more tries for Ulster in the next two seasons. A popular player throughout his time at Ravenhill, he amassed over 100 Ulster caps.

=== Leinster Rugby ===
Boss transferred to Leinster ahead of the start of the 2010-11 season. He signed for Leinster Rugby on a four-year deal and had a good first season playing 20 matches scoring 3 tries. In 2011-12 he played 15 matches scoring 2 tries. He retired at the end of the 2015-16 season.

== Ireland Rugby ==
Boss was part of the Under-19 New Zealand Rugby World Cup team in 1999.

Boss's Irish ancestry meant that he was qualified to play rugby for Ireland through his maternal grandmother who was from Glenarm County Antrim. Boss's consistency with Ulster in his debut season, the 2005/06 campaign, saw him rewarded with a first Ireland call-up. He made his full international debut for Ireland on their summer tour to New Zealand in June 2006. He made three substitute appearances for Ireland on the 2006 Southern Hemisphere Tour and started against Australia in the Autumn internationals. Isaac was selected for the Irish senior squad for the 2006/07 Autumn Internationals against South Africa and Australia, based on his performances he was included in that seasons Six Nations squad. During one of his most memorable performances, Isaac scored an historic try against England in the famous Croke Park victory in February 2007.

He returned to his native New Zealand as part of the Ireland squad for the 2011 Rugby World Cup, scoring a try in Ireland's one-sided win over Russia. Ireland were eliminated in the quarter-finals by Wales. Boss made just one appearance in the tournament, with Conor Murray and Eoin Reddan as Ireland’s first-choice scrum-halves.

His earned 23 Ireland caps and 13 Ireland Wolfhounds caps, 3 of which he gained in the 2009 Churchill Cup. Isaac captained the Ireland 'A' side in their opening game against Canada, going on to play in all three games and ultimately win the Cup for the first time.

== Post-playing career ==
Boss worked with the Smart Waikato Trust as the Education and Employment Manager for the South Waikato and King Country, working towards reducing youth unemployment in the area by offering free specialist support to businesses keen to develop entry-level work opportunities for young people, as well as coordinating the trust's Secondary School Employer Partnerships programme.

As well as working as a Commentator for Sky Sport, Boss also took part in a study on contact sports and long-term brain health, examining aspects of brain health, from mental wellness to cognitive functioning at Trinity College in 2019.

Boss currently works in the corporate world for T-Pro as an international operations representative.

== Coaching career ==
After retiring from professional rugby in 2016, Boss returned to New Zealand and began his coaching career in Tokoroa at Southern United Rugby Football Club as a Head Coach in 2018, becoming President of the club in 2019.

On 31 January 2020, it was announced that Boss would be appointed Head Coach of the King Country Rams in the Mitre 10 Heartland Championship for a two-year term.
