= The Politicians =

1980s band

- Origin: Tokoroa, New Zealand
- Genres: Rock, new wave, reggae
- Years active: 1981–199?
- Past members: Tim Armstrong; Wa Kupa; Doug Pepperell; Paul van Wering; Campbell Hapi; Paul Alderton; Ian Jeffries; Adrian Ellis; Donna Armstrong; Jeff Downey; Sam Ware

The Politicians were a rock/new wave/reggae band formed in Tokoroa, New Zealand, in March 1981. Originally writing and performing their own songs with such titles as "Shift worker", "Teacher Teacher", "Can't write a love song", "Arabian girl", and "5 Years time".

== Career ==
Two of their singles were played on various NZ television shows, including Shazam! and Radio with Pictures. They toured New Zealand for 5 years playing the hotel circuit. When Tim Armstrong left the band in May 1986 he went on to form the Kiwi Bandits, and the Tim Armstrong band. Which played at Zaks nitepub in Hamilton, New Zealand. The Politicians continued for almost another 10 years playing resident at Shakes niteclub in Hamilton, now known as the Altitude.

After their resident gig finished they carried on as a working band and recorded the album Test Pattern.

The singles "Photograph" and "Christmas Day" were released in 1986. "Grantham Street/Elenore" (single) was released in 1993.

2015 saw the release of an '80s compilation album called Hamiltune, two Politicians songs were featured on this.

== Legacy ==
Wa Kupa lives in Wairoa and Doug Pepperell is now in Perth, Australia. Paul Alderton is still performing with the swampdogs. Campbell Hapi is performing in China. Paul van Wering is teaching music and Guitar in Hamilton. Ian Jefferies has moved to Perth Australia, while Jeff Downey owns his own company, Downey Construction. Adrian Ellis continues his Music career and is living in the Tauranga area. Paul Krippner has his own sound company. Warren Williams is still playing music in Sydney and has his own finance broking business.

Tim Armstrong recorded three albums in the nineties: Relationships (1992), Breaking hearts (1993), and Wondering why (1995). Also a cover version of the Beatles' song "Here comes the sun" came out as a single in 1994.

Tim Armstrong's band is still performing and has released several albums and singles. He has also released songs with Howie Casey, a well known saxophone player from England. Tim Armstrong's later albums include Listen to your Heart (2007), Old kid on the block (2009), and 2010 (2010).

== Band members ==
- Tim Armstrong (guitar/vocals) (1981–1986)
- Wa Kupa (bass) (1981–1984)
- Doug Pepperell (drums) (1981–1982)
- Paul van Wering (guitar/keyboards) (1983-1990s)
- Campbell Hapi (bass) (1984–1986)
- Geoff Downey (drums) (1985-1990s)
- Paul Alderton (drums) (1982–1985)
- Donna Armstrong (keyboards) (1984–1986)
- Adrian Ellis (Bass) (1986–1990)
- Lance Healey (Bass) (1990)
- Paul Krippner (sound) (1985-1990s)
- Simon Elton (Bass) (1990s)
- Laurence Arps (guitar) (1990s)
- Corilin Steel (vocals) (1990s)
- Kevin Smith (Drums) (1990s)
- Liam Ryan (keyboards) various times
- Ian Jeffries (guitar) (1986–1990)
- Sam Ware (vocals) (1988–1990's)
- Warren Williams (Bass) (1986–1988)
- Kevin Popperwell (Lighting) (1983–1985)
- Derek McGrath (sound) (1981–1982)
- Howard Bright (lighting) (1982–1983)
- Steve Parker (Lighting) (1981)

Tim Armstrong band (1997 – present)

- Tim Armstrong (Electric guitar/vocals)
- Don McClumpha (Backing vocals/bass guitar)
- Nigel Sanderson (joined 2008) (Backing vocals/drums)

== Singles ==
Year	Single	Album	NZ Singles Chart	Certification
1984	Down in Baghdad/Looking for you		-	-
1985	Energy/Polar bear		-	-

=== Album ===
- Test Pattern (1993)
