= Inglewood High School, New Zealand =

Inglewood High School Taranaki, New Zealand

Location
- 129 Rata Street; Inglewood; 39.15631°S 174.19016°E

Information
- School type: State, Co-Educational
- Motto: constantia vincit (constant effort ensures success)
- Opened: 1957
- Ministry of Education Institution no.: 0177
- Principal: Miss Rosey Mabin
- Enrolment: 537 (July 2026)
- Website: www.inglewoodhs.school.nz

Inglewood High School is a decile 7, co-educational state secondary school (Years 9–13) in Inglewood in the Taranaki region of New Zealand's North Island.

The school was officially opened on 6 June 1957 by The Hon. R.M. Algie, Minister of Education, and it celebrated its 60th jubilee in 2017.

On 10 April 1968, a 15-year-old student shot and killed the school principal, Alexander Stuart Black, on the school grounds.

Approximately 537 students are enrolled at the school from year to year.

== Crest ==
The school crest was designed in 1957 by Margaret Stevenson (née Cooke). It displays nearby Mt Taranaki, the book of learning, the messenger's feet and the motto, constantia vincit (constant effort ensures success).

== Principals ==
- Charles Caldwell (1957–1959)
- Garfield Johnson (1959–1965)
- Alexander Black (1966–1968)
- Jack Porter (1968–1972)
- John Smith (1973–1982)
- Bob Clague (1983–1990)
- Lyn Bublitz (1991–2001)
- Angela Gattung (2002–2008)
- Rosey Mabin (2009–present)

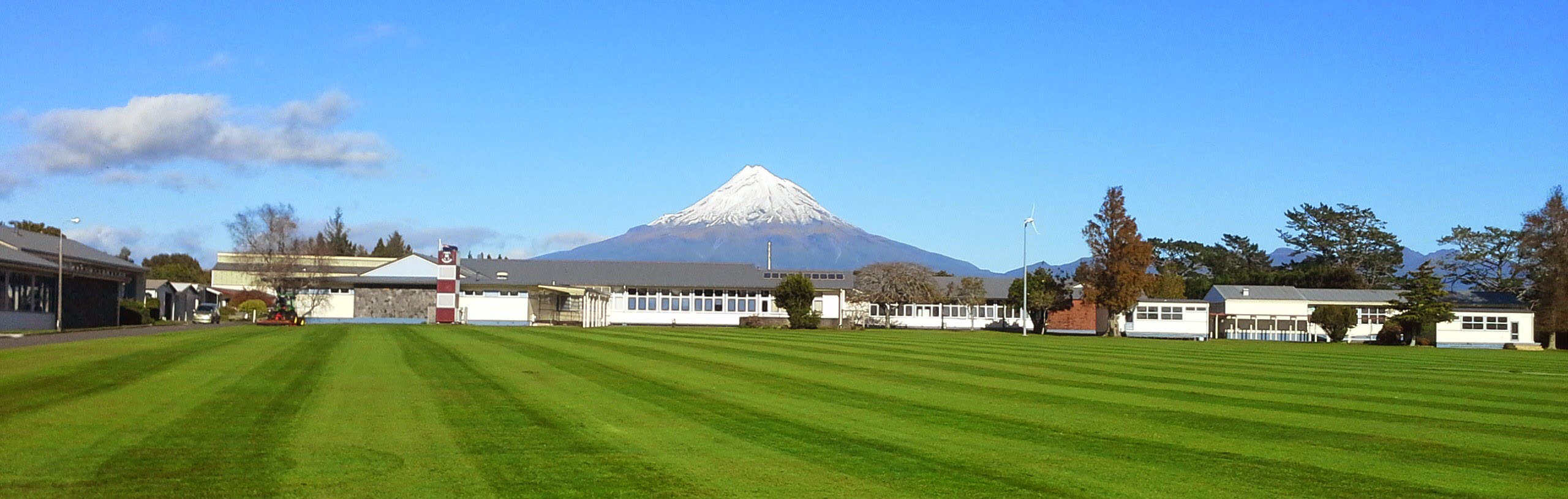
Inglewood High School with Mount Taranaki in the background

== Notable alumni ==
- Melissa Ruscoe - Football;Rugby Sevens;Rugby Fifteens player
- Erika Burgess – Netball player
- Lauren Burgess – Netball player
- Fleur Beale (née Corney; born 1945), fiction writer
- Fiona Clark - Photographer
- Bruce Gall – Rugby League footballer
- David Gauld – Mathematician
- Dave Loveridge – Rugby union player, All Black
- Bill Vincent – Judoka, Olympian
- Callum Gibbins - Rugby, Hurricanes (rugby union), Glasgow Warriors
