= Inglewood, New Zealand =

Settlement in Taranaki Region, New Zealand

Inglewood
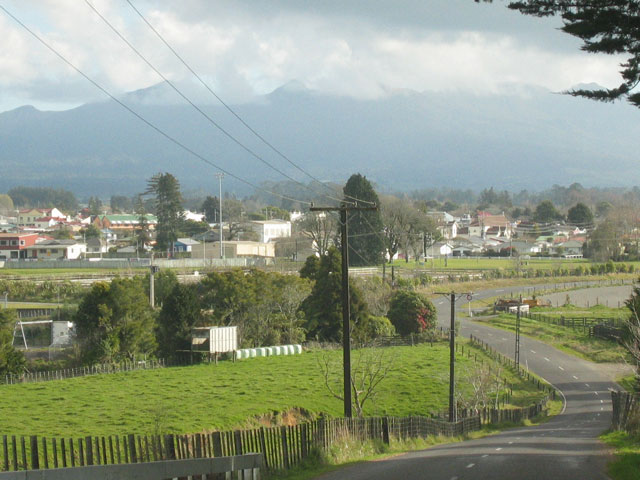
- A view of Inglewood from Lincoln Road, with Mount Taranaki in the background, hidden by cloud
- Interactive map of Inglewood
- Coordinates: 39°9′S 174°12′E
- Country: New Zealand
- Region: Taranaki Region
- Territorial authority: New Plymouth District
- Ward: Kōhanga Moa General Ward; Te Purutanga Mauri Pūmanawa Māori Ward
- Community: Inglewood Community
- Electorates: Taranaki-King Country; Te Tai Hauāuru (Māori)

Government
  - Territorial Authority: New Plymouth District Council
  - Regional council: Taranaki Regional Council
  - Mayor of New Plymouth: Max Brough
  - Taranaki-King Country MP: Barbara Kuriger
  - Te Tai Hauāuru MP: Debbie Ngarewa-Packer

Area
  - Total: 3.18 km^{2} (1.23 sq mi)

Population (June 2025)
  - Total: 3,970
  - Density: 1,250/km^{2} (3,230/sq mi)
- Postcode(s): 4330

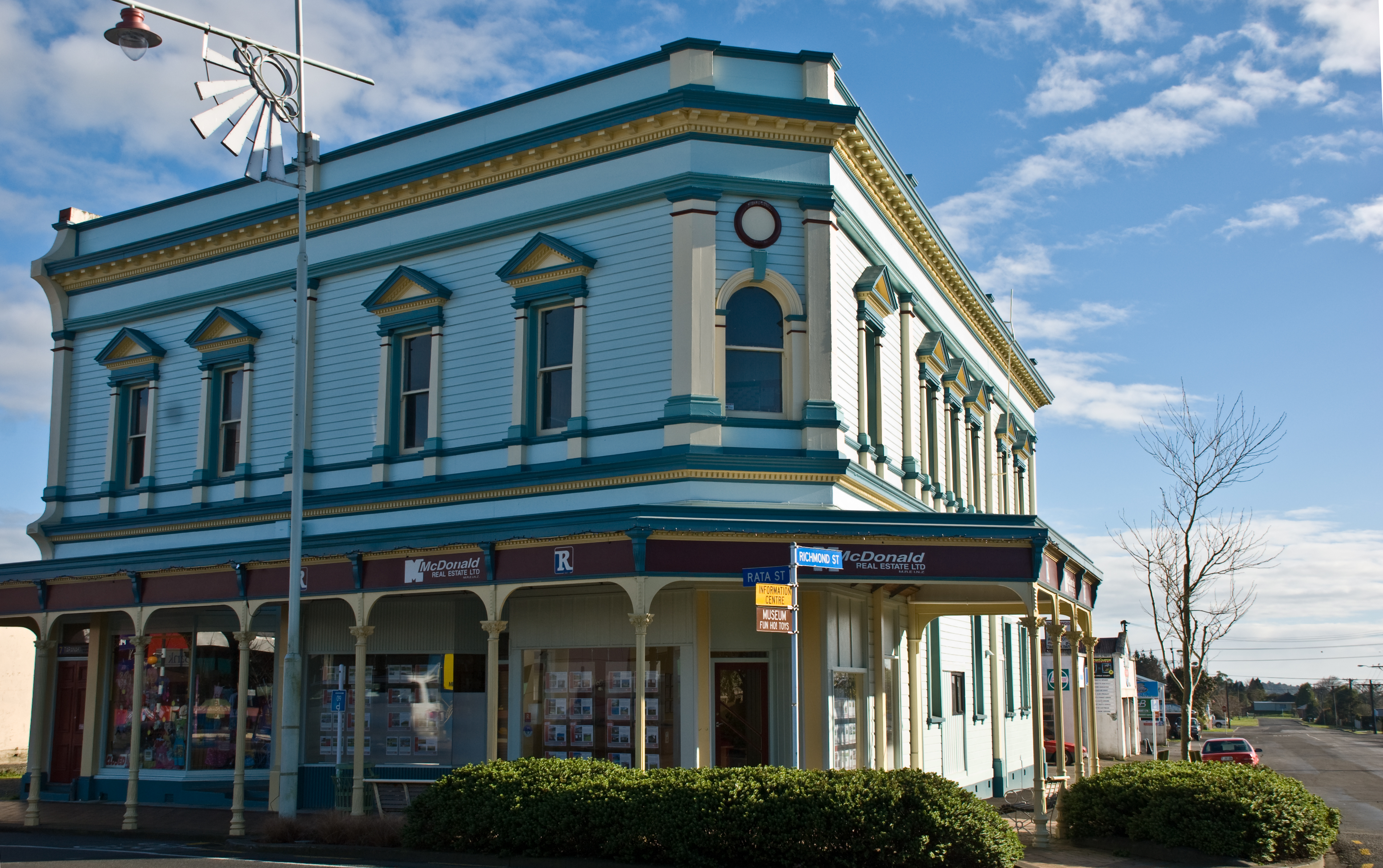
The Shoe Store Building, a Victorian commercial building in the centre of Inglewood with a Category II heritage listing

Inglewood is a town in the Taranaki Region of New Zealand's North Island. It is 16 kilometres (10 mi) southeast of New Plymouth on State Highway 3, close to Mount Taranaki, and sits 200 metres (660 ft) above sea level. The town services a mainly dairy farming region.

== History ==
The settlement was founded in 1873 and was originally called Moatown. The name was then changed to Milton, before ultimately being renamed to Inglewood in 1875 to avoid confusion with Milton in the South Island.

The railway reached Inglewood in 1877, connecting it with New Plymouth as part of the first extension of what is now the Marton–New Plymouth line.

Until 1991, Inglewood was home to the Moa-Nui Co-operative Dairies factory (which was the fourth largest dairy factory in New Zealand) before it was shut down in favour of centralised processing near Hāwera.

From 1949 until the late 1980s, Inglewood was home to Fun Ho! Toys, a manufacturer of collectible die cast metal toys and one of New Zealand's largest toy companies. The factory shut down in 1987 but a museum in the town still exists with over 3000 toys on display.

Despite its small population, the town has gained notoriety from a string of violent crimes which tend toward the gruesome, bizarre and barbaric. A 2015 book by the anthropologist Michael D. Jackson refers to "Inglewood's violent past" and "the popular claim that Inglewood is the 'murder capital' and 'psychopathic centre' of New Zealand".

Studies lend some support to this claim. While the national murder rate is about two per hundred thousand per annum, my hometown boasts a rate of twenty five per hundred thousand—not alarming by US standards (Inglewood, California has thirteen murders per thousand yet is safer than 25 percent of cities in the U.S.), but troubling for New Zealanders. It isn't just the discrepancy between the pastoral appearance of my hometown and its hidden history of violence that is so mystifying; it is the brutal and bizarre form that this violence takes.

— Michael D. Jackson, Harmattan: A Philosophical Fiction (Insurrections: Critical Studies in Religion, Politics, and Culture)

=== Historic buildings ===
A number of buildings are listed by Heritage New Zealand. Inglewood Railway Station and Yard is listed as Category I. The Shoe Store Building on the corner of Rata and Richmond Streets and the band rotunda on the corner of Rata and Moa Streets are listed as Category II.

=== Marae ===
Te Kōhanga Moa Marae is located in Inglewood. It features the Matamua meeting house, and is affiliated with the Te Āti Awa hapū of Pukerangiora.

In October 2020, the Government committed $817,845 from the Provincial Growth Fund to upgrade it and Muru Raupatu marae, creating 15 jobs.

== Demographics ==
Stats NZ describes Inglewood as a small urban area, which covers 3.18 km^{2} (1.23 sq mi). It had an estimated population of 3,970 as of June 2025, with a population density of 1,248 people per km^{2}.

Historical population
Year	Pop.	±% p.a.
2006	3,087	—
2013	3,255	+0.76%
2018	3,555	+1.78%
2023	3,801	+1.35%
The 2006 population is for a smaller area of 2.94 km^{2}. Source:

Inglewood had a population of 3,801 in the 2023 New Zealand census, an increase of 246 people (6.9%) since the 2018 census, and an increase of 546 people (16.8%) since the 2013 census. There were 1,845 males, 1,950 females, and 9 people of other genders in 1,497 dwellings. 2.4% of people identified as LGBTIQ+. The median age was 38.5 years (compared with 38.1 years nationally). There were 789 people (20.8%) aged under 15 years, 645 (17.0%) aged 15 to 29, 1,623 (42.7%) aged 30 to 64, and 741 (19.5%) aged 65 or older.

People could identify as more than one ethnicity. The results were 90.7% European (Pākehā); 16.8% Māori; 2.1% Pasifika; 3.2% Asian; 0.6% Middle Eastern, Latin American and African New Zealanders (MELAA); and 2.8% other, which includes people giving their ethnicity as "New Zealander". English was spoken by 97.2%, Māori by 2.5%, Samoan by 0.3%, and other languages by 4.0%. No language could be spoken by 2.4% (e.g. too young to talk). New Zealand Sign Language was known by 0.6%. The percentage of people born overseas was 12.8, compared with 28.8% nationally.

Religious affiliations were 28.9% Christian, 0.4% Hindu, 0.3% Māori religious beliefs, 0.2% Buddhist, 0.6% New Age, 0.1% Jewish, and 1.2% other religions. People who answered that they had no religion were 59.3%, and 9.2% of people did not answer the census question.

Of those at least 15 years old, 432 (14.3%) people had a bachelor's or higher degree, 1,794 (59.6%) had a post-high school certificate or diploma, and 780 (25.9%) people exclusively held high school qualifications. The median income was $38,100, compared with $41,500 nationally. 189 people (6.3%) earned over $100,000 compared to 12.1% nationally. The employment status of those at least 15 was 1,509 (50.1%) full-time, 420 (13.9%) part-time, and 57 (1.9%) unemployed.

== Education ==
Inglewood has a number of coeducational schools.

Inglewood High School is a secondary (years 9–13) school with a roll of 537. The school was established in 1957.

Inglewood Primary School and St Patrick's School are full primary (years 1–8) schools with rolls of 385 and 59, respectively. Inglewood Primary School was founded in 1875. St Patrick's is a state integrated Catholic school. St Patrick's was established in 1906 and moved to its current site in 1926.

Rolls are as of July 2026.

== Notable people ==
Inglewood has produced four All Blacks (John Major, Handley Brown, Dave "Trapper" Loveridge, Chris Masoe).

Other notable people include:

- Fleur Beale (née Corney; born 1945), fiction writer
- Henry Brown (1842–1921), sawmiller and Member of the House of Representatives (1896–1899)
- Fiona Clark (born 1954), photographer
- Callum Gibbins (rugby union)Hurricanes (rugby union)
- Ben Hana a.k.a. Blanket Man (1957–2012), Wellington identity, famous for wearing only a blanket
- Harry Kerr (1879–1951), athlete
- Margaret Sparrow (born 1935), medical doctor and reproductive rights activist
- Bill Sullivan (1891–1967), politician
