= Ben Hana =

Wellington, New Zealand vagrant (1957–2012)

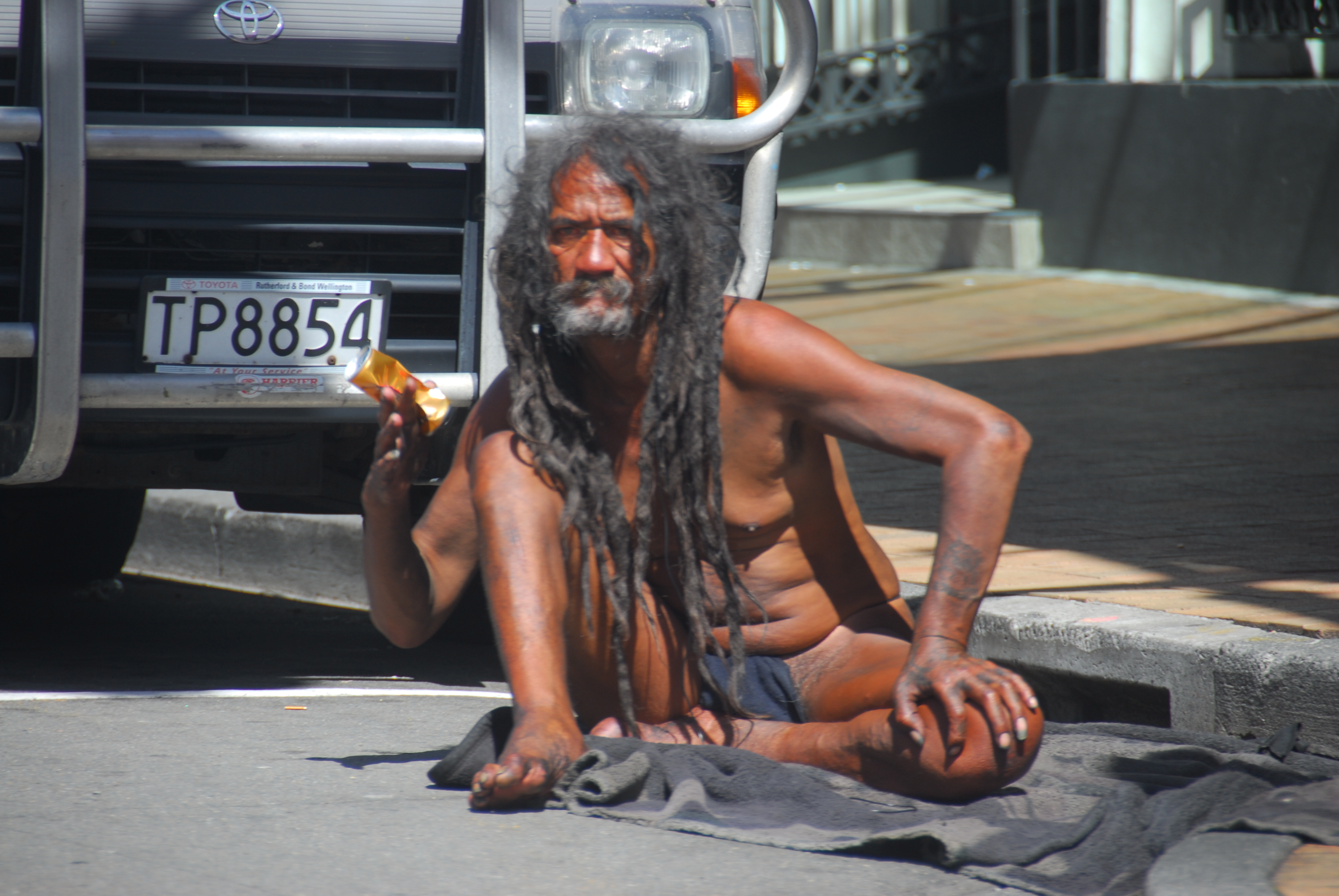
- Hana in 2008
- Born: 8 February 1957; Inglewood, New Zealand
- Died: 15 January 2012 (aged 54)

Bernard Hana, a.k.a. "Blanket Man" (1957 – 15 January 2012), was a homeless man who wandered the inner city streets of Wellington, New Zealand. He was a local fixture and something of a celebrity and was typically found on the footpath in the precincts of Cuba Street and Courtenay Place.

Hana was a self-proclaimed devotee of the Māori sun god Tama-nui-te-rā and claimed that he should wear as few items of clothing as possible, as an act of religious observance. As a result, he would sometimes remove all his clothing, which resulted in the attendance of police officers.

His nickname "Blanket Man" was a reference to his usual mode of dress, which was a single blanket, long dreadlocks, and either a loin cloth or briefs. His activities and presence provoked a degree of public debate within Wellington.

It is believed Hana chose to live on the streets after killing a friend in a drunk-driving incident, as a form of self-penance.

== Early life ==
Hana was born in Inglewood, New Zealand in 1957 to a Jehovah's Witness family.

In the late 1970s, he associated with the Black Power gang, living in Wellington, going by the name "Bugs" and fathering four children.

== Judicial hearings and convictions ==
Hana was arrested and imprisoned several times for offences, including public nudity and possession of cannabis. His criminal record reportedly ran 17 pages long. In 1979, he was convicted of drunk driving causing death.

Hana visited the South Island for the first time in 2010, was arrested, charged, and flown home after being provided with a shower and new overalls.

In 2010, a judge ordered that Hana be detained under the Mental Health Act 1992, and he was admitted to Wellington Hospital's psychiatric ward Te Whare O Matairangi, where "he will have clean clothes, regular meals, and no access to drink and drugs". In the same year, he was released back onto the streets without any notable change in character. In mid-2011, he was sectioned and detained again and subsequently diagnosed as living with schizophrenia. He was then discharged from hospital and given daily medication under a community treatment order, which allowed forced medical treatment as an outpatient. He mostly resided at his usual location on the central Wellington street of Courtenay Place until his death.

== Local celebrity ==
With his distinctive look and high visibility location, Hana became something of a local celebrity. In general, he was tolerated by some shopkeepers outside whose premises he sat, and by passers-by, although there were instances of opposition from other shopkeepers. Also, on occasions when he decided to push the boundaries of offensive behaviour, police officers were likely to be in attendance. As someone who departed from the patterns of normal behaviour, Hana had become a figure of amusement, sympathy, disgust, and even some academic interest. During the 2006 Rugby Sevens tournament, one costumed group appeared in dreads and blankets, mimicking his distinctive look.

=== In media ===
Hana featured in several works:

- Te Whanau o Aotearoa — Caretakers of the Land, a 2003 New Zealand documentary film by Errol Wright and Abi King-Jones
- In 2007, Victoria University of Wellington sociology lecturer Mike Lloyd and PhD student Bronwyn McGovern delivered a presentation titled "World Famous in Wellington: Blanket Man as contemporary celebrity" to the New Zealand Folklore Symposium.
- Tom Hunt – "The man behind the blanket", The Dominion Post (2010)
- The 2012 tribute song "Blanket Man", written by Leon Mitchell, sung by Michael Murphy, recorded and released by ZM radio

== Death ==
Hana, aged 54, died at Wellington Hospital at 3:35 p.m. on 15 January 2012 of suspected viral myocarditis. He was also known to have medical problems stemming from heavy alcohol use and malnutrition. A temporary shrine was created outside the ANZ Bank on Courtenay Place, a location where Hana could often be found. Messages were written on the building's facade, and flowers, candles, food, and other items were left in tribute.

Among those who paid tribute were Wellington mayor Celia Wade-Brown and sports athlete Sonny Bill Williams. His funeral was paid for by philanthropist Gareth Morgan.

== See also ==
- Vagrancy
