= Bruce Simpson (blogger) =

New Zealand blogger and activist

Bruce Simpson is an internet celebrity and activist from New Zealand best known for his long running blog, YouTube channels and his 2003 attempt to build a cruise missile with parts ordered from internet retailers. In 2019, he announced that he had been diagnosed with Parkinson's Disease.

== Youtube Channels ==
Bruce Simpson runs two main YouTube channels: RCModelReviews and xjet. On these channels Bruce reviews new products, talks about news and provides an educational (and somewhat technical) insight to the world of all things RC with a focus on quadcopters, RC aircraft and RC gear, electronics and camera equipment.

His latest feature videos are a detailed breakdown of long range UHF radios in the hobby.

Suppliers the world round send Bruce samples of their product which he pulls apart online for viewers; from propeller theory to electronic breakdowns at a circuit board level.

== Aardvark Daily ==
Simpson's personal website Aardvark has operated since 1996 as a blog and newslink site, focusing on science, technology and the internet. It is New Zealand's longest running blog.

== 7am.com ==
The news aggregation service 7am.com was developed by Bruce Simpson in 1997. 7am provided a simple Java applet that anyone could put on their website, which would display a stream of news items, and link to the website with that item. This service was a pioneer in providing syndicated content free of charge. Although successful, the concept was not profitable to operate from New Zealand because of expensive and limited internet connectivity at the time. Simpson sold down his interests in the company in 1999.

== DIY Cruise Missile ==
Simpson garnered significant media attention in 2003 when he announced his intention to build a DIY cruise missile for US$5000 using only "off-the-shelf" technology, mostly purchased from eBay and other online stores. The purpose of the project was to prove the point he made in an article published on 20 May 2002 that a cruise missile can be built with off the shelf technology and knowledge available to the general public. Simpson states on his FAQ page that he is not developing a new technology or creating a new threat, but creating awareness of an existing threat with the hope that it will stimulate research into an effective defence.

The project was put on hold when Simpson was adjudged bankrupt after a prosecution by the New Zealand Inland Revenue Department. Simpson claimed that the prosecution was politically motivated, as it was the only legal strategy available to the government of New Zealand to stop his work. A documentary which aired in April 2004 explored the events surrounding his prosecution. Simpson resumed and completed construction of the prototype cruise missile. His website claims that the missile is in "safe hands" somewhere in New Zealand, in a location unknown to him. Simpson says that not knowing the missile's whereabouts is a legal strategy intended to prevent his prosecution while it is tested. Simpson also claims to be halfway finished with completing a second cruise missile which he intends to donate to a museum or educational institution. He stated an intention to release a book about his experience with the development of the missile, the media interest in 2003, and the reaction of the United States and New Zealand Governments to his announcement.

== International Model Park ==
Simpson proposed an International Model Park to the full South Waikato District Council, including Mayor Sinclair and CEO Craig Hobbs, on 10 June 2014. A request for NZ$170,000 to build a hangar to host visitors and the delisting of the Tokoroa airfield so that it was not illegal for children to fly Radio control in 4 km of the area was presented.

== Other projects ==
Simpson has been heavily involved in the development of pulsejet technology. He has served as an expert build adviser on the television show Scrapheap Challenge when the episode revolved around building jet-powered drag cars.

Simpson also has significant experience in the world of radio control model aircraft design and construction. It was the combination of these areas of expertise which led to the cruise missile project.
