= Moturoa (disambiguation) =

Moturoa is a coastal suburb of New Plymouth, in the western North Island of New Zealand

Moturua may also refer to the following places:

- Moturoa Island (Bay of Islands), Northland Region
- Moturoa (island) off the coast of Taranaki
- Moturoa / Rabbit Island in the Tasman Bay
- Moturoa Island (Tower Rock) Cathedral Cove, Coromandel Peninsula
