= Skay =

Skay or SKAY may refer to:

- SKAY, a Ukrainian pop-rock band
- Skay Beilinson (born 1952), Argentine guitarist
- Brigitte Skay (1940–2012), German actress

== See also ==
- Skai (disambiguation)
- Sky (disambiguation)
- Skey
