= Moturoa =

Suburb of New Plymouth, New Zealand

- Suburb
- Interactive map of Moturoa
- Coordinates: 39°3′49″S 174°2′8″E
- Country: New Zealand
- City: New Plymouth
- Local authority: New Plymouth District Council
- Electoral ward: Kaitake-Ngāmotu General Ward; Te Purutanga Mauri Pūmanawa Māori Ward

Area
  - Land: 215 ha (530 acres)

Population (June 2025)
  - Total: 4,390
  - Density: 2,040/km^{2} (5,290/sq mi)

Sugarloaf Islands, Ngā-Motu, New Plymouth Power Station	Port Taranaki
Paritutu, Mahoe	Moturoa	New Plymouth Central
Port View, Mt. Moturoa, Onuku Taipari Domain, Omata	Spotswood	Blagdon, Lynmouth

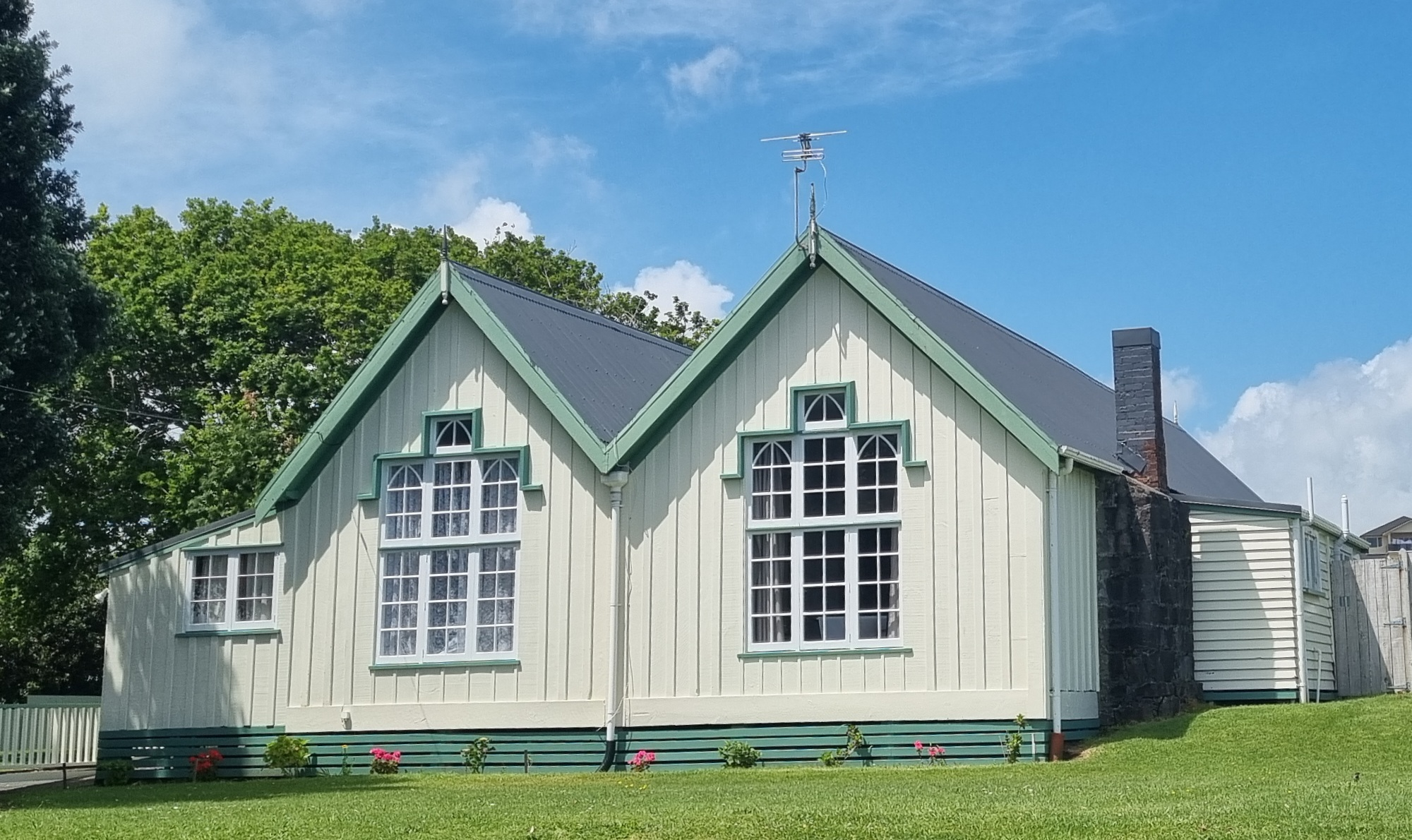
Whiteley Mission House

Moturoa is a coastal suburb of New Plymouth, in the western North Island of New Zealand. It is located to the west of the city centre, bordering Port Taranaki and the Sugar Loaf Islands. One of the islands, Moturoa, the largest, shares its name with the suburb.

The Ngamotu Domain lies to the south of Moturoa, and Mount Moturoa to the west. Ngamotu Beach is to the north.

Moturoa was commonly known as Tigertown last century. In 2007 a book was written about the early history of Moturoa.

== History ==
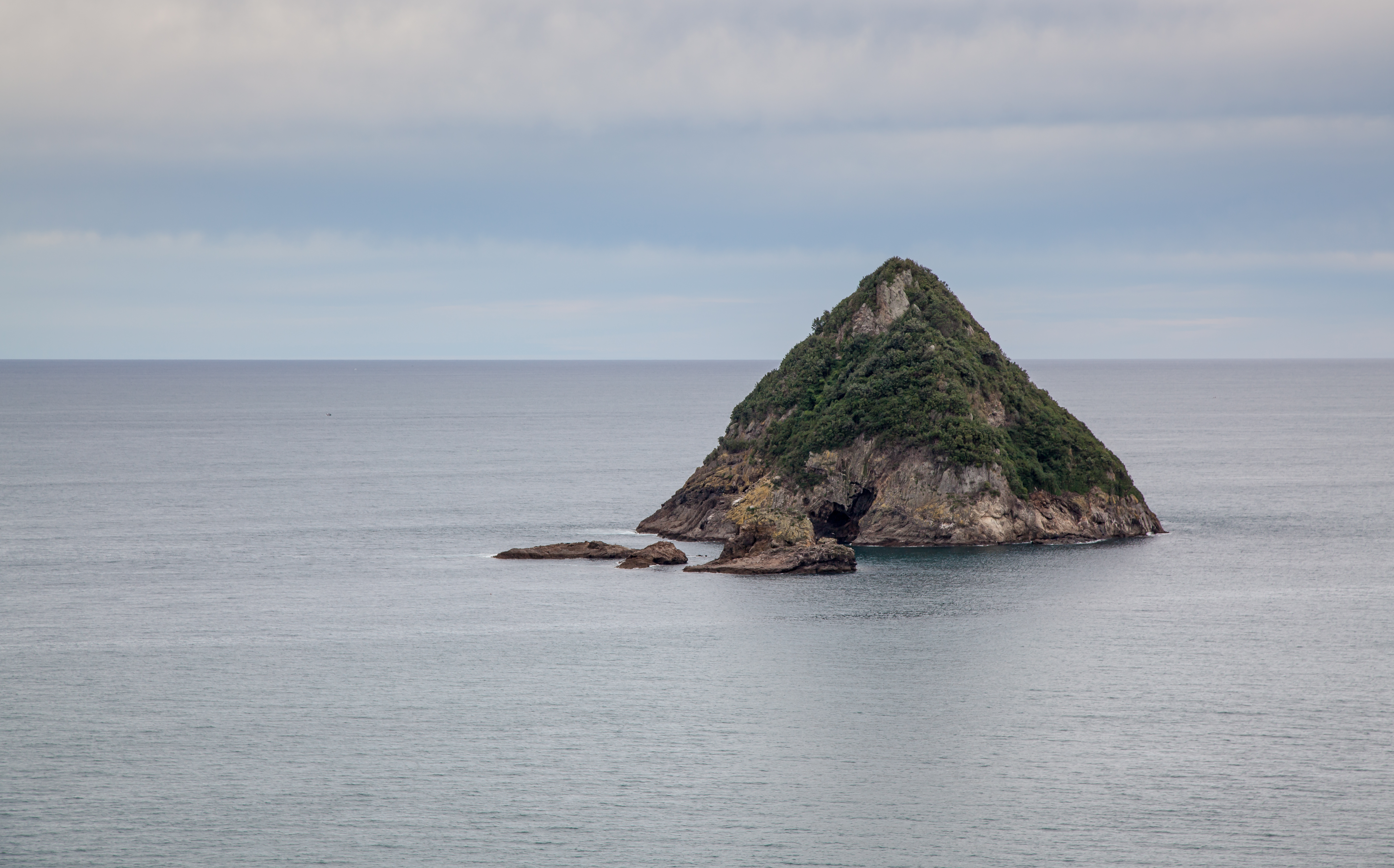
Moturoa Island, the namesake of the suburb

=== The siege of Otaka Pā and Dicky Barrett ===
In 1832 Richard (Dicky) Barrett and his former crewmates (recalled as Akerau, probably Akers, Tamiriri, probably Wright, Kopiri probably Phillips, and Oliver in 1873) joined local Maori in the Otaka pā at Ngamotu, (Where the freezing works are) to aid their defence in the face of an attack by heavily armed Waikato Māori, firing on the invaders with three cannon, using nails, iron scraps and stones for ammunition. The siege lasted more than three weeks before the Waikato withdrew, leaving a battle scene strewn with bodies, many of which had been cannibalised. In June Barrett, and John (Jacky) Love, migrated south with as many as 3000 Atiawa Māori.

Jacky Love, was Captain of the 60 ton schooner Adventure. The Adventure’s arrival in New Zealand came almost 60 years after Captain James Cook’s first voyage in 1769.

Barrett and Love both married into the local iwi.

As well as being a trader, Dicky went on to become an explorer, a whaler, interpreter and agent to the NZ Company, a publican and farmer. Barrett's whaling business suffered heavy losses and, after he was forced to sell his hotel in 1841, he led a party of Te Ātiawa back to Taranaki and went on to help establish settlers in New Plymouth.

Barrett died at Moturoa, on 23 February 1847, possibly from a heart attack or following injury after a whaling accident, and was buried in Wāitapu urupa (cemetery) at the seaside end of Bayly Road, adjacent to Ngāmotu Beach, New Plymouth, alongside his daughter Mary Ann, and later on by his wife Wakaiwa Rawinia, in 1849. Wāitapu was the first cemetery in New Plymouth and the first recorded burial was Mary Ann.

=== Port of Moturoa ===
The natural harbour at Port Taranaki before reclamation was once called the Port of Moturoa on early cadastral survey maps. Cargo was transported by small vessels to ships waiting out at sea until the port was opened in 1881.

=== Early Industry ===
In 1865 the Alpha well was drilled near Mikotahi at New Plymouth. This was the first oil well in what is now the Commonwealth and one of the first in the world. A petroleum industry developed at Moturoa, including producing wells and refineries, known as the Moturoa oilfield. The last refinery there was closed in 1972. The field continues to produce small quantities of oil. There was once an ironworks, oilworks, dairy and meat cool store.

=== Trams (public transport) ===
New Plymouth's electric tramway system (proposed as early as 1906) began operations on 10 March 1916 between Fitzroy and Weymouth Street (a short distance past the railway station). In the first week of operation, 18,213 passengers rode the trams. Weymouth Street through Moturoa to the Breakwater at the port opened on 21 April 1916. The closure of the system on 23 July 1954.

=== Moturoa Street ===
Moturoa Street was once known as Medley Lane and lined with houses but these have mostly disappeared. They have been replaced with commercial premises or are vacant sections. The street was nicknamed as "Melody Lane" by Tigertown residents.

=== Hongi-Hongi stream ===
The Hongi-hongi stream has its source to the east of Eton Place. The stream once made its way to a lagoon and then into the sea at Ngamotu Beach. The Honeyfield residence, built by Dicky Barrett, was close by on the eastern side, with sand dunes on the western side. The stream and lagoon, in Sir George Greys' Polynesian Mythology, were said to be named by "Turi" in relation to the strong smell of "sulphuretted hydrogen gas". The stream is culverted from the end of Harbour Street, going under Breakwater Road, through to the western end of what remains of Ngāmotu Beach.

=== Ngāmotu Beach ===
Ngāmotu Beach was labelled "The Playshore of the Pacific". The New Year's celebration and other carnivals at Ngāmotu became annual events, drawing crowds from all around Taranaki till they began to decline in popularity from the late 1950s. The final carnival was held at the beach in 1966, giving way to other, more fashionable, forms of family entertainment.

It is home to the 1st Mikotahi Sea Scouts.

== Demographics ==
Moturoa, including Kawaroa, covers 2.15 km^{2} (0.83 sq mi) and had an estimated population of 4,390 as of June 2025, with a population density of 2,042 people per km^{2}.

Historical population
Year	Pop.	±% p.a.
2006	4,071	—
2013	4,011	−0.21%
2018	4,137	+0.62%
2023	4,275	+0.66%

Moturoa had a population of 4,275 in the 2023 New Zealand census, an increase of 138 people (3.3%) since the 2018 census, and an increase of 264 people (6.6%) since the 2013 census. There were 1,974 males, 2,277 females, and 21 people of other genders in 1,905 dwellings. 3.8% of people identified as LGBTIQ+. There were 636 people (14.9%) aged under 15 years, 690 (16.1%) aged 15 to 29, 1,935 (45.3%) aged 30 to 64, and 1,017 (23.8%) aged 65 or older.

People could identify as more than one ethnicity. The results were 82.2% European (Pākehā); 17.5% Māori; 1.8% Pasifika; 9.1% Asian; 1.3% Middle Eastern, Latin American and African New Zealanders (MELAA); and 3.1% other, which includes people giving their ethnicity as "New Zealander". English was spoken by 97.4%, Māori by 3.6%, Samoan by 0.4%, and other languages by 9.7%. No language could be spoken by 1.8% (e.g. too young to talk). New Zealand Sign Language was known by 0.4%. The percentage of people born overseas was 21.6, compared with 28.8% nationally.

Religious affiliations were 33.8% Christian, 2.2% Hindu, 0.8% Islam, 0.6% Māori religious beliefs, 0.5% Buddhist, 0.8% New Age, 0.1% Jewish, and 1.1% other religions. People who answered that they had no religion were 52.6%, and 7.6% of people did not answer the census question.

Of those at least 15 years old, 888 (24.4%) people had a bachelor's or higher degree, 1,953 (53.7%) had a post-high school certificate or diploma, and 807 (22.2%) people exclusively held high school qualifications. 414 people (11.4%) earned over $100,000 compared to 12.1% nationally. The employment status of those at least 15 was 1,725 (47.4%) full-time, 546 (15.0%) part-time, and 108 (3.0%) unemployed.

Individual statistical areas
Name	Area (km^{2})	Population	Density (per km^{2})	Dwellings	Median age	Median income
Moturoa	1.02	1,908	1,871	828	45.3 years	$38,700
Kawaroa	1.13	2,367	2,095	1,077	43.8 years	$40,000
New Zealand					38.1 years	$41,500

== Education ==
Moturoa School is a coeducational contributing primary (years 1-6) school with a roll of 143 students as of July 2026. It opened in 1923. Since 2006 the school has been home to the two primary classes of the New Plymouth Montessori school, which was previously at the (now closed) Kaimiro School near Egmont Village. Moturoa School was the first Enviroschool in Taranaki and has achieved Silver award level.

== Sport ==
Association Football (soccer)

Moturoa is home to Moturoa AFC, with clubrooms at Onuku Taipari Domain on Ngāmotu Road.

Rugby League

Western Suburbs Tigers Rugby League Club is based at the Ngamotu Domain in Moturoa.

Rugby Union

Moturoa Football Club was a short lived rugby football club. Started by the Breakwater Sports Committee at the Malva Tea Kiosk on 28 February 1914. Affiliated to the Taranaki Rugby Union at the general meeting with C.W.Williams as club delegate, on 27 March 1914. The team was able to secure the prison reserve field opposite the freezing works for training. Owing to more Thursday teams playing Saturday competitions, the club amalgamated with Star Rugby Football Club on 7 May 1914, retaining a junior team to play in white, the colour of Moturoa, but wearing the Star emblem on the jersey.

Cricket

The Moturoa Beachcombers was a cricket team in mid to late 1910s. The team played against East End at East End beach, New Plymouth. And in January 1911 made a journey by motor launch to play Urenui at Urenui. Players, among others were, Stohr, Humphries, McCord and Brown.
