= Skei =

Skei may refer to:

== People ==
- Hans H. Skei, a Norwegian writer

== Places ==
- Skei, Møre og Romsdal, a village in Surnadal Municipality in Møre og Romsdal county, Norway
- Skei, Innlandet, a village in Gausdal Municipality in Innlandet county, Norway
- Skei, Vestland, a village in Sunnfjord Municipality in Vestland county, Norway
- Skei Municipality (later renamed Ogndal Municipality), a former municipality in the Nord-Trondelag county, Norway
- Skei Church, a church in Steinkjer Municipality in Trøndelag county, Norway

== Other uses ==
- Skei may also refer to a type of longship used by the Vikings

== See also ==
- Skai (disambiguation)
- Skey
