= Motuotamatea =

Island in New Zealand

Motuotamatea Island
Snapper Rock
- Interactive map of Motuotamatea Island

Geography
- Location: Back Beach Port Taranaki
- Coordinates: 39°03′40″S 174°01′2″E
- Type: Ancient Volcanic Islet
- Archipelago: Sugar Loaf Islands
- Area: 15,570 m^{2} (167,600 sq ft)
- Length: 184 m (604 ft)
- Width: 123 m (404 ft)
- Highest elevation: 17 m (56 ft)

Administration
- New Zealand

Demographics
- Population: 0 (2023)

Motuotamatea is a long sloped island, located off the coast of Taranaki, New Zealand, at New Plymouth. It is part of the group of inner islands and is one of the westernmost and the third largest of the Sugar Loaf Islands at Back Beach. Its native name in Māori means "snapper rock" because of its shape similar to that of a New Zealand snapper fish.

Motuotamatea is around 17 meters tall at its highest elevation, 107 metres long at its longest point, and around 100 metres wide. It is separated from the Taranaki coast of the New Plymouth mainland by a shallow sand bank that connects to the mainland at low tides as a tombolo, but only on very low spring tides and occasionally during summer.

A cluster of smaller islands known as the Seal Rocks, of which Waikaranga is the largest, lies some 350 metres northwest off the island. Nearby are Pararaki (Seagull Rock) and Mataora (Round Rock) to the east of the island near Shark Alley.

== History ==
Motuotamatea is mostly uninhabited besides the occasial visit from the public on the beach. But it and several of the other Sugar Loaf Islands were hunting, fishing and gathering grounds and places of refuge for local inhabitants, such as the Māori tribes of the Taranaki Iwi and the Te Āti Awa for hundreds of years.

== Geology ==
Motuotamatea along with the other Sugar Loaf Islands, represent the oldest volcanic activity on the Taranaki peninsula. Dating between 1.7 and 1.74 million years ago. The island is mostly made of andesite rock material.

== See also ==
- List of Islands of New Zealand
- List of Islands
