= Skai =

Skai or SKAI may refer to:

- SKAI (band), a Ukrainian pop rock band
- Skai Group, a Greek media group, contains:
  - Skai TV, a Greek television network
  - Skai 100.3, a Greek radio station
- Skai Isyourgod (born 1998), Chinese rapper
- Skai Moore (born 1995), American football linebacker (NFL, Indianapolis Colts)
- Skai Jackson (born 2002), American actress

== See also ==
- Skay (disambiguation)
- Sky (disambiguation)
- Skei (disambiguation)
