= Taranakite =

Iron-aluminium phosphate mineral

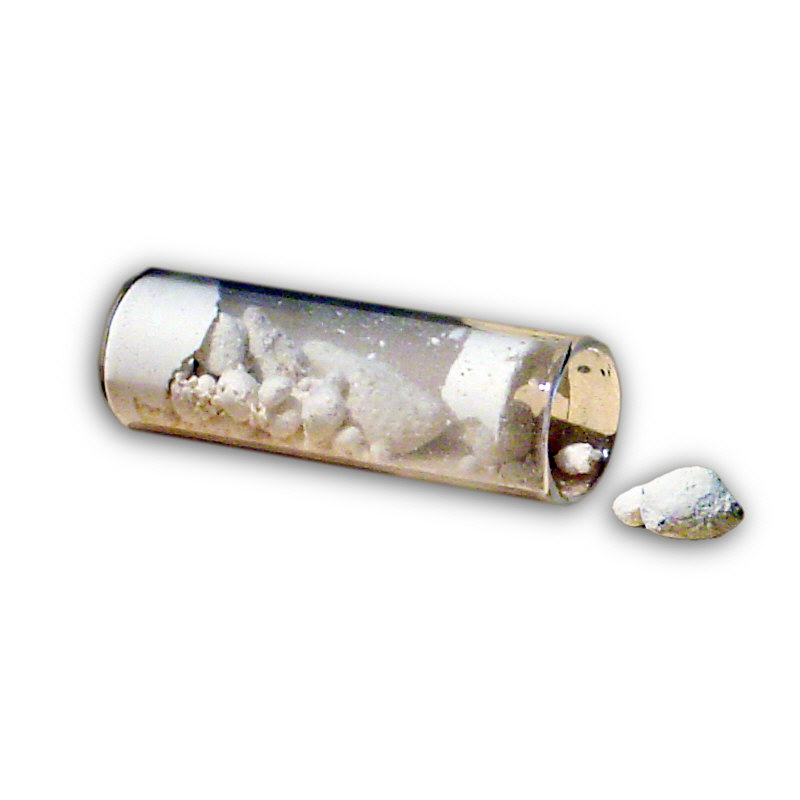

General
- Category: Phosphate minerals
- Formula: (K,Na)_{3}(Al,Fe^{3+})_{5}(PO_{4})_{2}(HPO_{4})_{6}·18H_{2}O
- IMA symbol: Tar
- Strunz classification: 8.CH.25
- Crystal system: Trigonal
- Crystal class: Hexagonal scalenohedral (3̅m); H-M symbol: (3̅ 2/m)
- Space group: R3̅c (no. 167)
- Unit cell: a = 8.7025, c = 95.05 [Å]; Z = 6

Identification
- Formula mass: 1,342.30 g/mol
- Color: White, pale yellow, or gray
- Crystal habit: Platy, massive, nodular
- Tenacity: Malleable, unctuous
- Mohs scale hardness: 1–2
- Streak: white
- Diaphaneity: Transparent
- Specific gravity: about 2.13
- Optical properties: Uniaxial (−)
- Refractive index: n_{ω} = 1.506–1.510 n_{ε} = 1.500–1.503
- Solubility: Insoluble in water Slightly soluble in acids

Taranakite is a hydrated alkali iron-aluminium phosphate mineral with the chemical formula (K,Na)_{3}(Al,Fe^{3+})_{5}(PO_{4})_{2}(HPO_{4})_{6}·18 H_{2}O. It forms from the reaction of clay minerals or aluminous rocks with solutions enriched in phosphate derived from bat or bird guano or, less commonly, from bones or other organic matter. Taranakite is most commonly found in humid, bat inhabited caves near the boundary of guano layers with the cave surface. It is also found in perennially wet coastal locations that have been occupied by bird colonies. The type location, and its namesake, the Sugar Loaf Islands off Taranaki, New Zealand, is an example of a coastal occurrence.

Taranakite forms small white, pale yellow, or gray crystals, which are typically found in pulverulent nodular aggregates, or crusts. Taranakite crystallizes in the hexagonal system, and is noted as having the longest crystallographic axis of any known mineral: the c-axis of the taranakite unit cell is 9.505 nanometers long.

== Occurrence ==
Taranakite was first described in 1866 by James Hector and William Skey. The material had been found by H. Richmond on the Sugar Loaf Islands of Taranaki, New Zealand (in the vicinity of 39.049086°S 174.027708°E), as thin yellowish-white amorphous seams in fissures within trachytic rocks. Within the taranakite, dark yellow-brown seams were observed and thought to be wavellite. Modern X-ray analysis later showed this inclusion to be vashegyite (Al_{11}(PO_{4})_{9}(OH)_{6})·38H_{2}O).

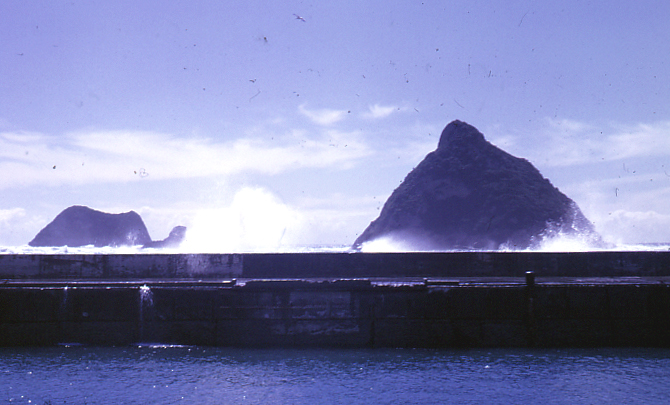
Two of the Sugar Loaf Islands.

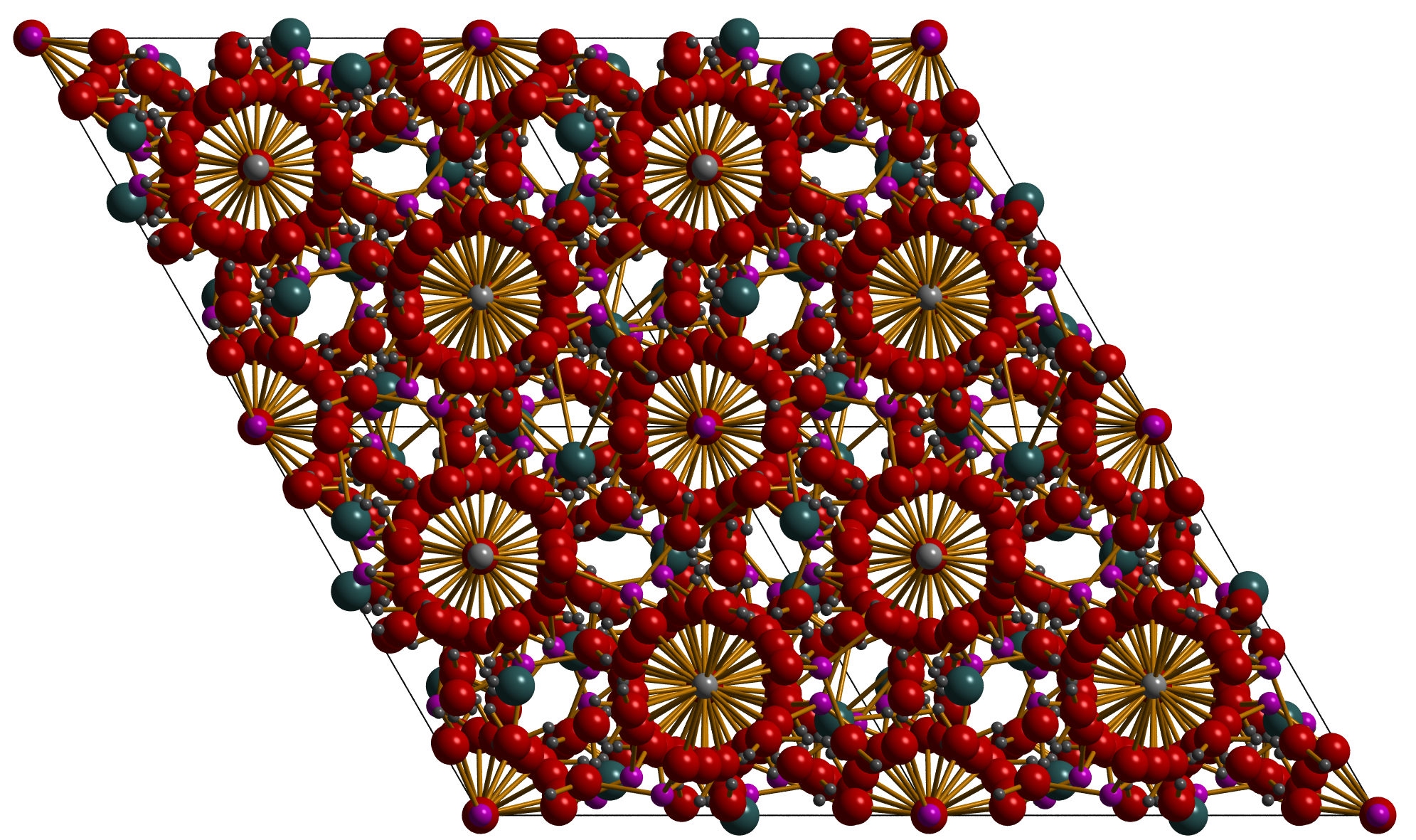
View down the c-axis of taranakite (four unit cells visible)

Taranakite itself was initially mistaken for wavellite. Physical differences—its relative softness and ease of fusibility—led Skey, the colonial New Zealand Government analyst, to undertake quantitative chemical analysis which identified the mineral as a double hydrous phosphate of aluminia and potash, with some replacement of aluminium with ferric iron. This identified it as a new mineral species – the first to be discovered in New Zealand.

Hector and Skey identified bird guano as the most likely source of the phosphate required to form taranakite, and speculated on possible advantages of its use in making superphosphate, owing to the absence of carbonate and relatively small amounts of aluminium. Such industrial use was never realized owing to the limited distribution of taranakite.

Taranakite was rediscovered in two cave locations, and given two new names. In 1894, Armand Gautier described a mineral which he called minervite from caves at Grotte de Minerve in Hérault, France and argued that it formed from decomposing guano and animal remains reacting with clays. He experimentally justified this by reacting ammonium phosphate with gelatinous aluminium oxide, iron carbonate, and limestone. These reactions yielded a minervite-like compound, and iron and calcium phosphates similar to what he observed in the caves. In 1904 Eugenio Casoria found a mineral under a guano layer at Monte Alburno, Italy which he called palmerite. These two minerals were later identified through X-ray powder diffraction as taranakite and discredited in favor of taranakite by historical priority.

Further occurrences of taranakite include:

- Misserghin, Algeria (as minervite) (1895)
- Jenolan Caves, Australia (as minervite) (1898)

No guano deposits are present in the caves; phosphatization is believed to occur from river water containing organic matter penetrating the cave.

- Réunion, Indian Ocean (as minervite) (1910)

Within a basalt cave in the Saint-Paul district

- Islas Leones, Patagonia (1933)

Associated with a penguin colony

- Pig Hole Cave, near Blacksburg, Virginia (1954)

A limestone cave. Taranakite occurs as a powder near the contact of bat guano and hair with clay, and within fractures in brecciated clay. This was the first discovery of taranakite in the United States.

- Onino-Iwaya cave, Hiroshima Prefecture, Japan (1975)

As a powder associated with gypsum within clay sediments, no more than three centimeters below the surface in areas of bat guano deposits.

- Mezesse Cave near Yaoundé, Cameroon

Coralloid speleothems of regularly alternating taranakite and opal microlayers in a granitic cave. The regular layering of taranakite was explained as the seasonal effect of leaching of guano and flow of clay from upper parts of the cave during the rainy season.

- Cook's Head Rock and Green Island, Otago, New Zealand (2003)

Occurring with leucophosphite as microcrystalline aggregates in jointed and brecciated basalt. Little blue penguins on Green Island and gulls on Cooks Head Rock are believed to be the main guano source.

The coastal occurrences, in New Zealand and Patagonia, occur at high latitudes supporting the necessity of humid conditions for the formation of taranakite. In the tropics, rather than taranakite, the minerals that form from guano-derived phosphatization of igneous rocks are variscite (AlPO_{4}·2H_{2}O), metavariscite (AlPO_{4}·H_{2}O), barrandite ((Al,Fe^{3+})PO_{4}·2H_{2}O), strengite and phosphosiderite (Fe^{3+}PO_{4}·2H_{2}O).

== Presence in soils ==
Taranakite is observed to form in the reaction zone of fertilizers. Potassium-taranakite (synonymous with taranakite) or ammonium-taranakite (where the alkali cations are replaced by ammonium) may form in acidic soils treated with potassium or ammonium-containing phosphate-fertilizers. The formation of taranakites, which are relatively insoluble, can act to reduce the bioavailability of phosphorus, potassium, and nitrogen if formed. This can both hinder plant growth in initial stages by reducing the available cations, and also aid in the long run by extending the presence of these nutrients.

== Structure ==
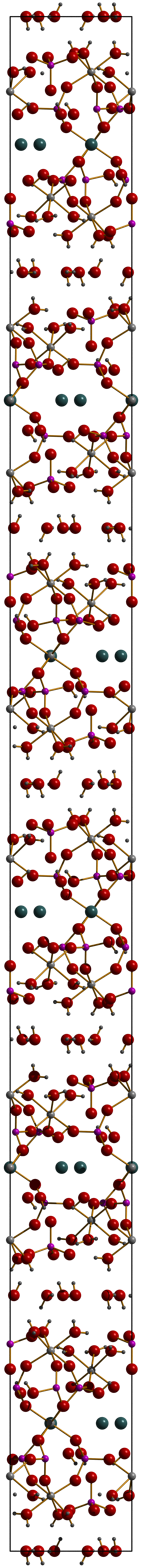
View of the taranakite unit cell perpendicular to the c-axis

Taranakite crystallizes in the hexagonal crystal system (hexagonal scalenohedral, 3̅2/m) with the space group R3̅c. The unit cell dimensions are a = 870.25 pm and c = 9505 pm, enclosing a volume of 6.234 nm^{3}. The c-axis is the longest of any known mineral.

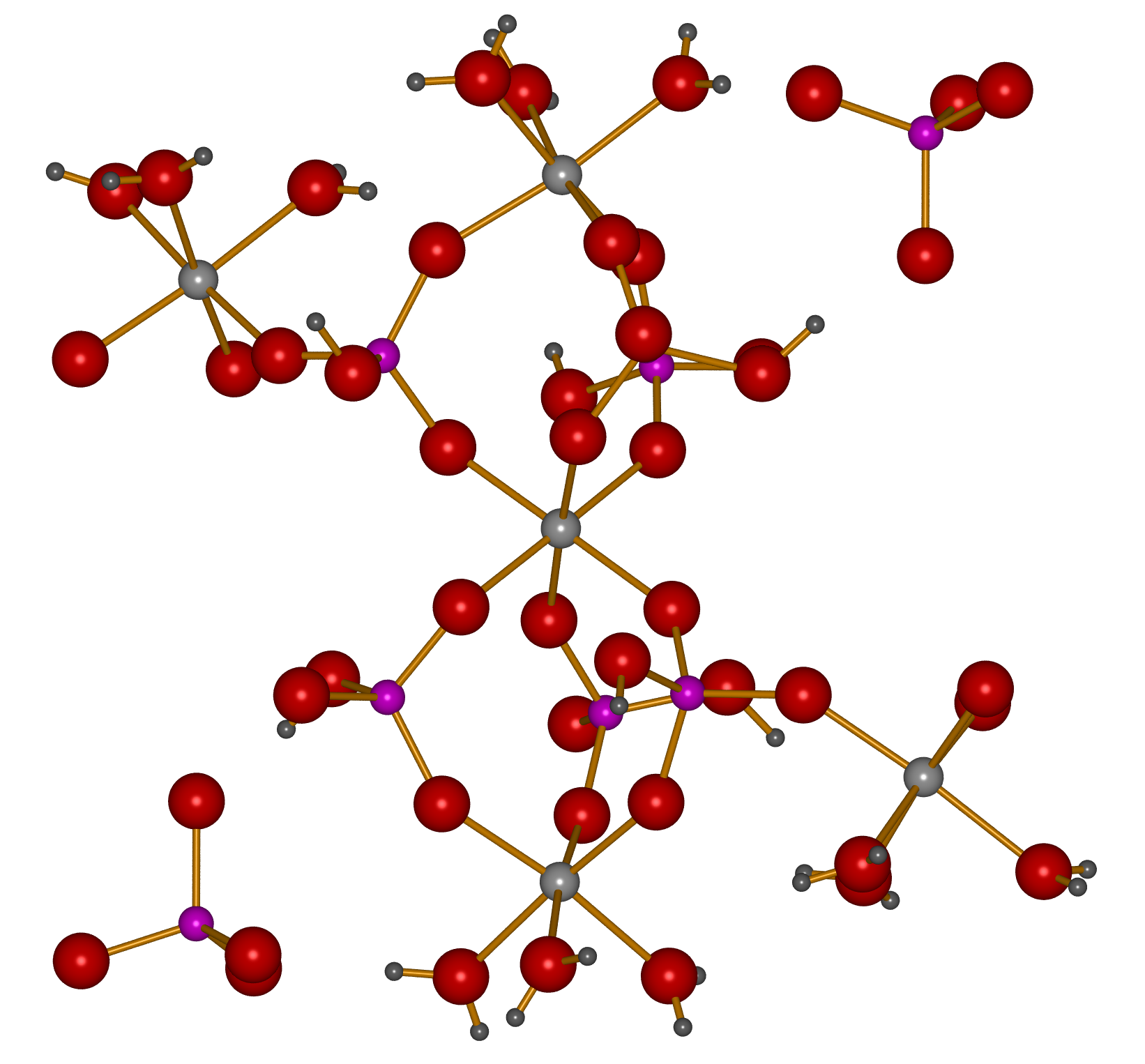
Atomic environment within a layer of the taranakite unit cell, showing three crystallographically distinct aluminium centres linked by HPO_{4}^{2−} units (potassium ions not shown).

The unit cell of taranakite contains six layers of composition K_{3}Al_{5}(HPO_{4})_{6}(PO_{4})_{2}(H_{2}O)_{12}, each 13.78 Å thick and separated by layers of water. The rigid structure of each layer is built around hydrogenphosphate (HPO^{2−}_{4}) groups coordinating three crystallographically distinct aluminium centres, each of which has coordination number six. Near the middle of each layer, an aluminium ion octahedrally coordinates six HPO^{2−}_{4}. Two other oxygens in each hydrogen phosphate group coordinate the other distinct aluminium centres, which in turn are coordinated octahedral to three hydrogen phosphate groups and three water molecules. This structure forms an Al'–P–Al''–P–Al' linkage nearly parallel to the c-axis, with the other distinct aluminium atom offset, and nearly vertically below a PO^{3−}_{4} ion.

Taranakite readily loses water when heated. Thermal gravimetric analysis shows two endothermic water loss events occurring in the ranges 80–140 °C and 140–300 °C corresponding to the sequential loss of five and thirteen water molecules to form francoanellite and a noncrystalline material. Heating to 500 °C results in complete dehydration to form K_{3}Al_{5}P_{8}O_{29}. In the range 562–595 °C crystalline AlPO_{4} and KAlP_{2}O_{7} form.
