= Motumahanga =

Island in New Zealand

Motumahanga Island
Saddleback Rock
- Interactive map of Motumahanga Island

Geography
- Location: Back Beach Port Taranaki
- Coordinates: 39°02′43″S 174°00′52″E
- Type: Ancient Volcanic Islet
- Archipelago: Sugar Loaf Islands
- Area: 17,910 m^{2} (192,800 sq ft)
- Length: 207 m (679 ft)
- Width: 130 m (430 ft)
- Highest elevation: 28 m (92 ft)

Administration
- New Zealand

Demographics
- Population: 0 (2023)

Motumahanga is an island, located off the coast of Taranaki, New Zealand, at New Plymouth. It is part of the group of outer islands and is the northernmost and the third largest of the Sugar Loaf Islands at Back Beach. Its native name in Māori means "saddleback rock" because of its shape similar to that of a saddle for a horse.

Motuotamatea is around 28 meters tall at its highest elevation, 207 metres long at its longest point, and around 130 metres wide. It is separated from the Taranaki coast of the New Plymouth mainland by Tokomapuna (Barrett Reef) and is available for the public for tours.

A group of smaller islands exist close to the island and are part of the Tokomapuna (Barrett Reef), and mostly are some 10 metres west off the island. To the east of the island are smaller rocks that often have many birds and seals living on them, including various other wildlife.

== History ==
Motumahanga cannot be accessed by the public directly as it and Moturoa island are protected marine reserves for wildlife. However the local touring boat Chaddy's Charters allows people to see the island up close without landing on it. Motumahanga and several of the other Sugar Loaf Islands were historically hunting, fishing and gathering grounds and places of refuge for local inhabitants, such as the Māori tribes of the Taranaki Iwi and the Te Āti Awa for hundreds of years.

== Geology ==
Motumahanga along with the other Sugar Loaf Islands, represent the oldest volcanic activity on the Taranaki peninsula. Dating between 1.7 and 1.74 million years ago. The island is mostly made of andesite rock material.

== See also ==
- List of Islands of New Zealand
- List of Islands
