= Moturoa (island) =

Island near New Plymouth, New Zealand

Moturoa Island
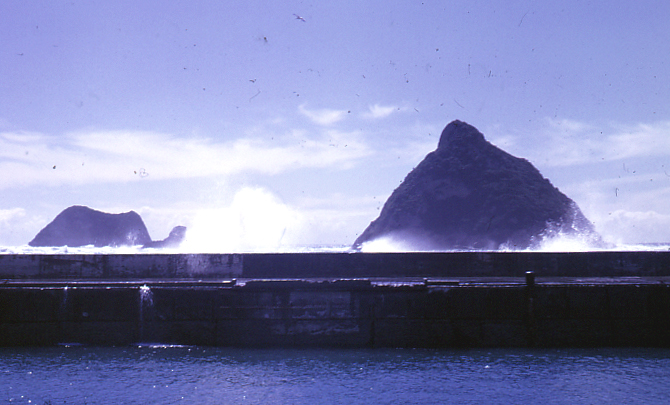
- Motumahanga and Moturoa
- Interactive map of Moturoa

Geography
- Location: near Port Taranaki
- Coordinates: 39°02′55″S 174°01′40″E
- Archipelago: Sugar Loaf Islands
- Length: 120 m (390 ft)
- Width: 100 m (300 ft)
- Highest elevation: 81 m (266 ft)

Administration
- New Zealand

Demographics
- Population: 0

Moturoa is a steeply sloped island off the coast of Taranaki, New Zealand. It is the easternmost and largest of the Sugar Loaf Islands, hence its name, which is Māori for "long island". Moturoa is 120 metres long at its longest point, and around 100 metres wide. It is separated from the Taranaki coast of the North Island mainland by an 800-metre (2,600 ft) wide channel. The entrance to Port Taranaki lies just to the east.

The island has lent its name to Moturoa, a suburb of New Plymouth, which lies on the mainland 1.5 kilometres to the southeast.

A cluster of smaller islands, of which Whareumu (Lion Rock) is the largest, lies some 60 metres off the island's southwest coast.

== Habitation ==
Moturoa is uninhabited, but it and several of the other Sugar Loaf Islands were hunting, fishing and gathering grounds and places of refuge for local inhabitants and the Taranaki and Te Āti Awa for hundreds of years.

== Blasting Moturoa and Whareumu ==
In the early 20th century Moturoa and Whareumu were blasted with explosives in the hope to connect the islands to Mikotahi and the growing port at Moturoa on the mainland. After this was abandoned focus turned to mining Paritutu, west of New Plymouth.

The appearance of the two islands was changed greatly as a result of this work.

== See also ==
- Desert island
- List of islands
