= Sugar Loaf Islands =

Island group in Taranaki, New Zealand

Ngā Motu ("The islands" in Māori)
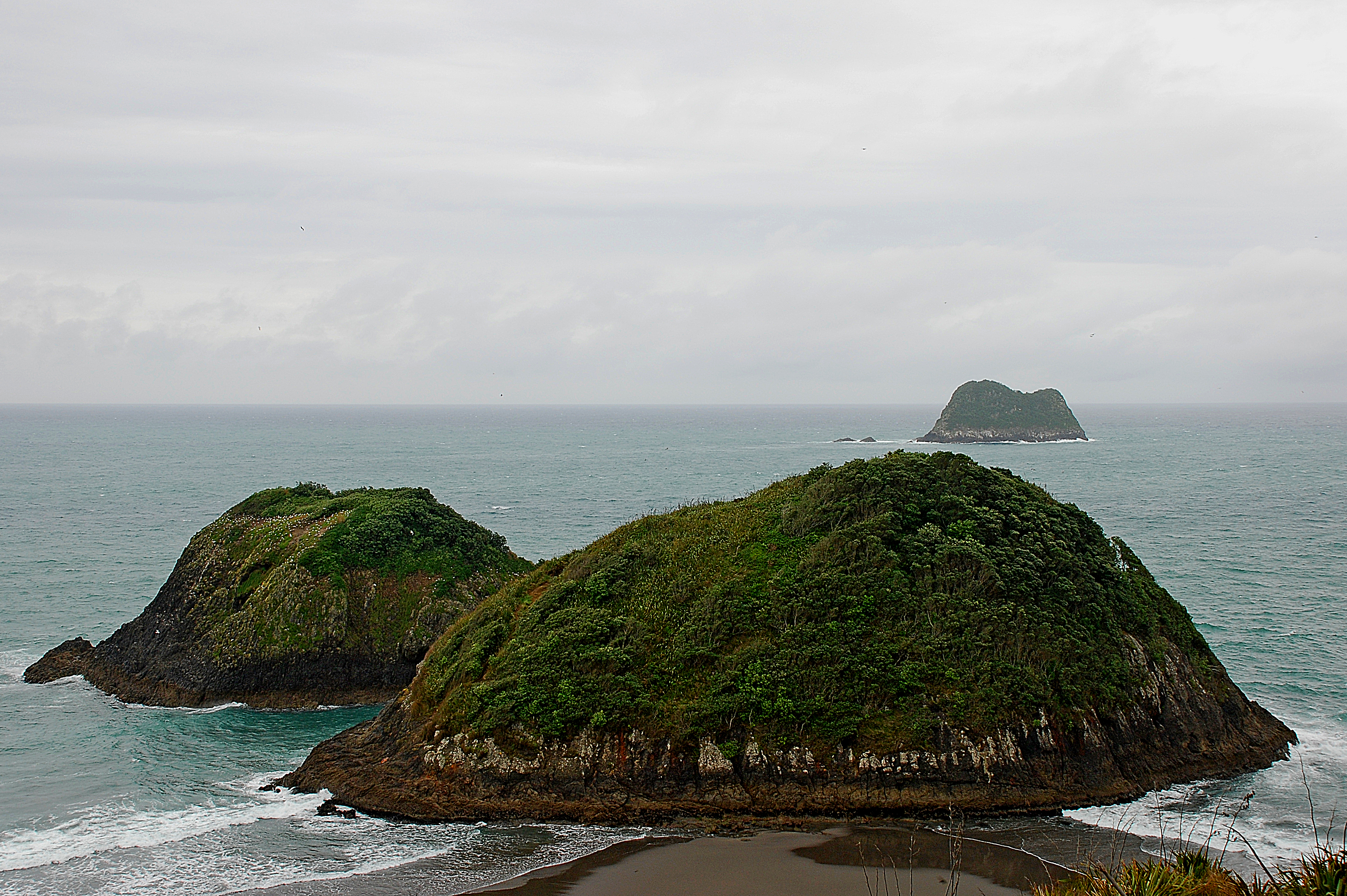
- Seagull Rock and Round Rock, with Saddleback in the background
- Interactive map of Sugar Loaf Islands

Geography
- Location: near Port Taranaki
- Coordinates: 39°2′58″S 174°1′40″E

Administration
- New Zealand

Demographics
- Population: 0

The Sugar Loaf Islands (often Sugarloaf; Māori: Ngā Motu, lit. 'the islands') are a collection of five small uninhabited islands and several sea stacks near Port Taranaki, in New Plymouth, New Zealand.

The largest, Moturoa Island, covers approximately 1.4 hectares (3.5 acres). Motumahanga is the island farthest from shore, at approximately 1.5 kilometres (0.93 miles).

Ngā Motu was one of the first areas inhabited by descendants of Te Whiti o Rongomai, and the islands and reefs were all named by the Ngāti Te Whiti iwi. The island group was given its English name in 1770 by James Cook because they reminded him of the way sugar was stored in heaps in Europe.

The Sugar Loaf Islands Marine Protected Area (SLIMPA) was established in 1991 to protect the area from oil exploration. This strengthened the protection that had been in place since the formation of a marine park in 1986.

In 2013 New Plymouth District Council unanimously agreed to gift the protected area back to the government for treaty settlement negotiations with Taranaki and Te Āti Awa iwi.

== Islands ==
The Sugar Loaf Islands can be divided into inner and outer island groups.

The inner islands comprise Mataora (Round Rock), Pararaki (Seagull Rock) and Motuotamatea (Snapper Rock). Mataora connects to the mainland at low tides as a tombolo, as does Motuotamatea on very low spring tides. Pararaki is separated from Mataora by a 20 meter wide channel.

The outer islands comprise Motumahanga (Saddleback Island) and Moturoa.

Several small rock outcrops are included in the island group. Waikaranga (Seal Rocks), and Tokatapu are several hundred meters offshore. Close to Moturoa lie Whareumu (Lion Rock), a vegetated stack and two barren rocks, and Tokomapuna (Barrett Reef).

	Name		Coordinates
	Māori	English	Coordinates
Inner islands	Mataora	Round Rock	39.059683°S 174.020326°E
	Motuotamatea	Snapper Rock	39.061316°S 174.017193°E
	Pararaki	Seagull Rock	39.059400°S 174.019425°E
Outer islands	Motumahanga	Saddleback Island	39.045403°S 174.014688°E
	Moturoa Island		39.049115°S 174.027461°E
Stacks	Tokomapuna	Barrett Reef	39.050115°S 174.021066°E
	Tokatapu		39.056801°S 174.000306°E
	Waikaranga	Seal Rocks	39.056367°S 174.003149°E
	Whareumu	Lion Rock	39.050785°S 174.026763°E

== Mikotahi ==
Mikotahi was formerly a tidal island, with a historic pā. In 1865 the Alpha well was drilled near Mikotahi. This was the first oil well in what is now the Commonwealth and one of the first in the world. The earth works to reclaim land for the New Plymouth Power Station reduced the island's size and permanently connected it to the mainland. There is a trig site on what remains to this day, Mikotahi point.

Mikotahi had a neighbouring stack that was connected to the mainland at the base of Paritutu. The people from Moturoa called it Fishing Rock. With caves, rockpools and surrounding beaches it was mostly destroyed from excavations for the cooling water inlet and land reclamation for the power station.

== Blasting and mining ==
In the early 20th century Moturoa and Whareumu (Lion Rock) were blasted with explosives in the hope to connect the islands to Mikotahi and the growing port at Moturoa. After this was abandoned focus turned to mining Paritutu.

The appearance of the two islands was changed greatly as a result of this work.

== Human habitation ==
Mataora, Motu-o-Tamatea, Moturoa Island, and Mikotahi were hunting, fishing and gathering grounds and places of refuge for local inhabitants and the Taranaki and Te Āti Awa for hundreds of years.

== Marine protected area ==
In 1986, an area encompassing the Sugar Loaf Islands was protected as a marine park. Concern over oil exploration led to strengthening of the protection, through the enacting of the 1991 Sugar Loaf Islands Marine Park Act. An area of 752.5 hectares (1,859 acres), including 5.3 hectares (13 acres) of land, encompassing the islands and surrounding seabed and ocean spanning from Port Taranaki in the north to Herekawe Stream in the south, was protected from commercial and recreational fishing and from mining. The act deemed Moturoa Island, Motumahanga, Waikaranga, and Whareumu as sanctuary areas requiring a permit for entry, with the remaining area a conservation park. Reef heron, little blue penguin, New Zealand fur seal, and orca are monitored species in the area. The islands are on migration routes for oceanic birds, whales, and dolphins.

In 2008, the 1,404-hectare (3,470-acre) Tapuae Marine Reserve was established adjacent to the Sugar Loaf Island Marine Protected Area (SLIMPA).

== Geology ==
The andesite (red shading) of the larger Sugar Loaf Islands and Paritutu Rock on the land is in centre of map. To their south-south-east off the default map are younger and presently larger andesitic direct deposits of the other volcanoes of the Taranaki Volcanic Lineament. Clicking on the map enlarges it, and enables panning and mouseover of volcanic feature name/wikilink and ages before present. The key to the other volcanics that are shown with panning is basalt - brown, monogenetic basalts - dark brown, undifferentiated basalts of the Tangihua Complex in Northland Allochthon - light brown, arc basalts - deep orange brown, arc ring basalts -orange brown, dacite - purple, andesite - red, basaltic andesite`- light red, rhyolite - violet, ignimbrite (lighter shades of violet), and plutonic - gray.

The Sugar Loaf Islands, along with onshore pinnacles such as Paritutu (153 m (502 ft)), represent the oldest volcanic activity on the Taranaki peninsula. Dating between 1.7 and 1.74 million years of age, the islands are believed to be the remains of a ring fracture or feeders to eroded volcanic vents, and are composed of a porphyritic hornblende andesite. Volcanic activity in Taranaki subsequently shifted to Kaitake (580,000 years ago), then migrated southeast to Pouakai (230,000 years ago) and the current centre of activity, Taranaki (last erupted in 1755).

The Sugar Loaf Islands are the type locality of taranakite, a phosphate mineral that forms from the reaction of bird guano with the aluminous rocks comprising the islands. This was the first new mineral species to be discovered in New Zealand.

== See also ==
- List of islands of New Zealand
- List of islands
- Desert island
