= Skey =

Skey is a surname. Notable people with this surname include:

- Frederic Carpenter Skey (1798–1872), English surgeon
- Henry Skey (1836–1914), English astronomer and meteorologist in New Zealand
- Larry Skey (1911–1977), Canadian businessman and politician
- Samantha Skey, digital engagement strategist
- William Skey (1835–1900), New Zealand chemist and poet
