= Tapuae Marine Reserve =

Marine reserve in New Zealand

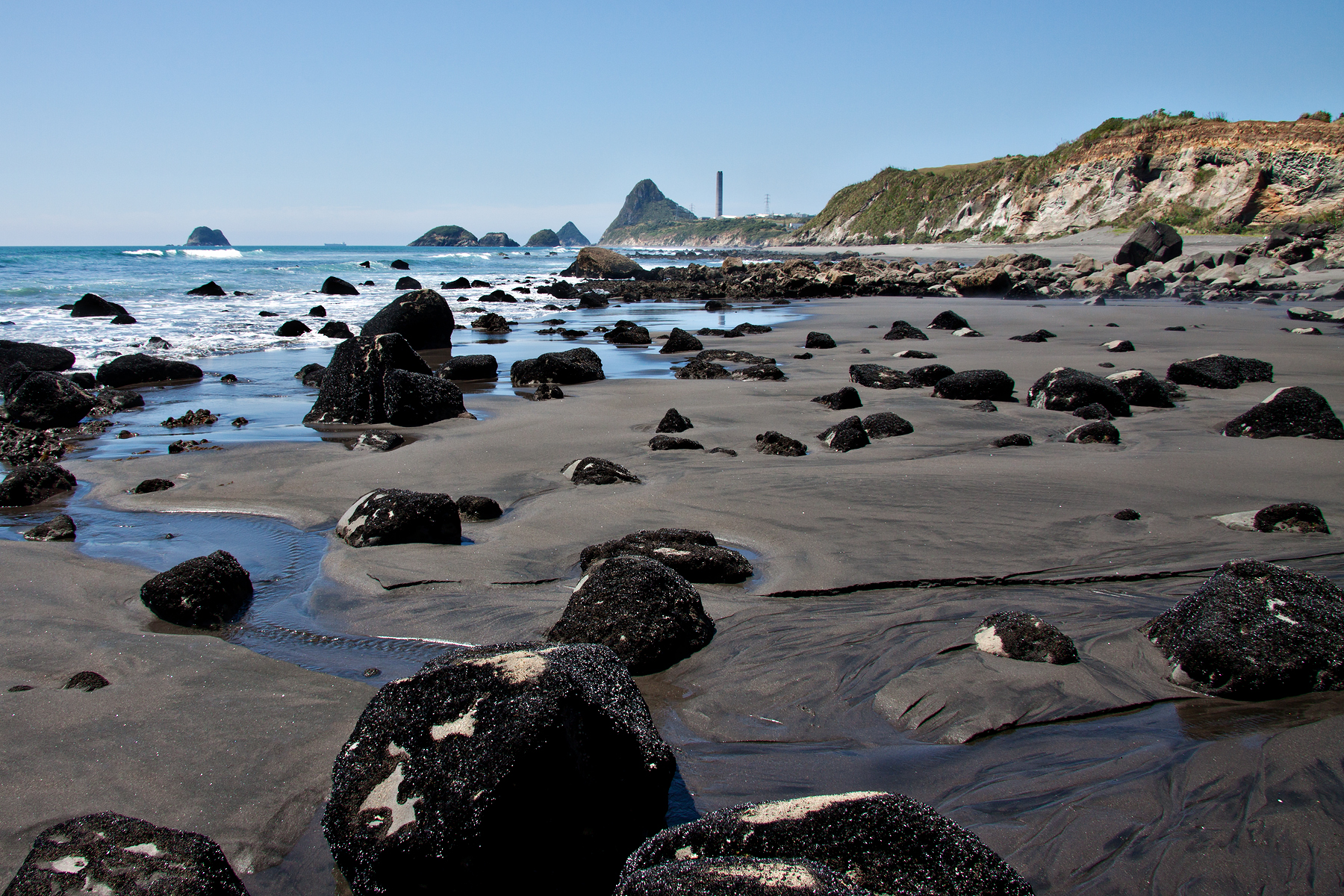
- Tapuae Beach, the southern border of the Tapuae Marine Reserve

- Location within New Zealand
- Location: New Zealand
- Coordinates: 39°3′30″S 174°0′28″E
- Area: 1,404 ha (3,470 acres)
- Established: 2008
- Governing body: Department of Conservation

Tapuae Marine Reserve is a marine reserve created in 2008 off the Taranaki coast of New Zealand.

It protects an area of 1404 ha and adjoins the Sugar Loaf Islands Marine Protected Area.
