= Henry Skey =

New Zealand astronomer and meteorologist

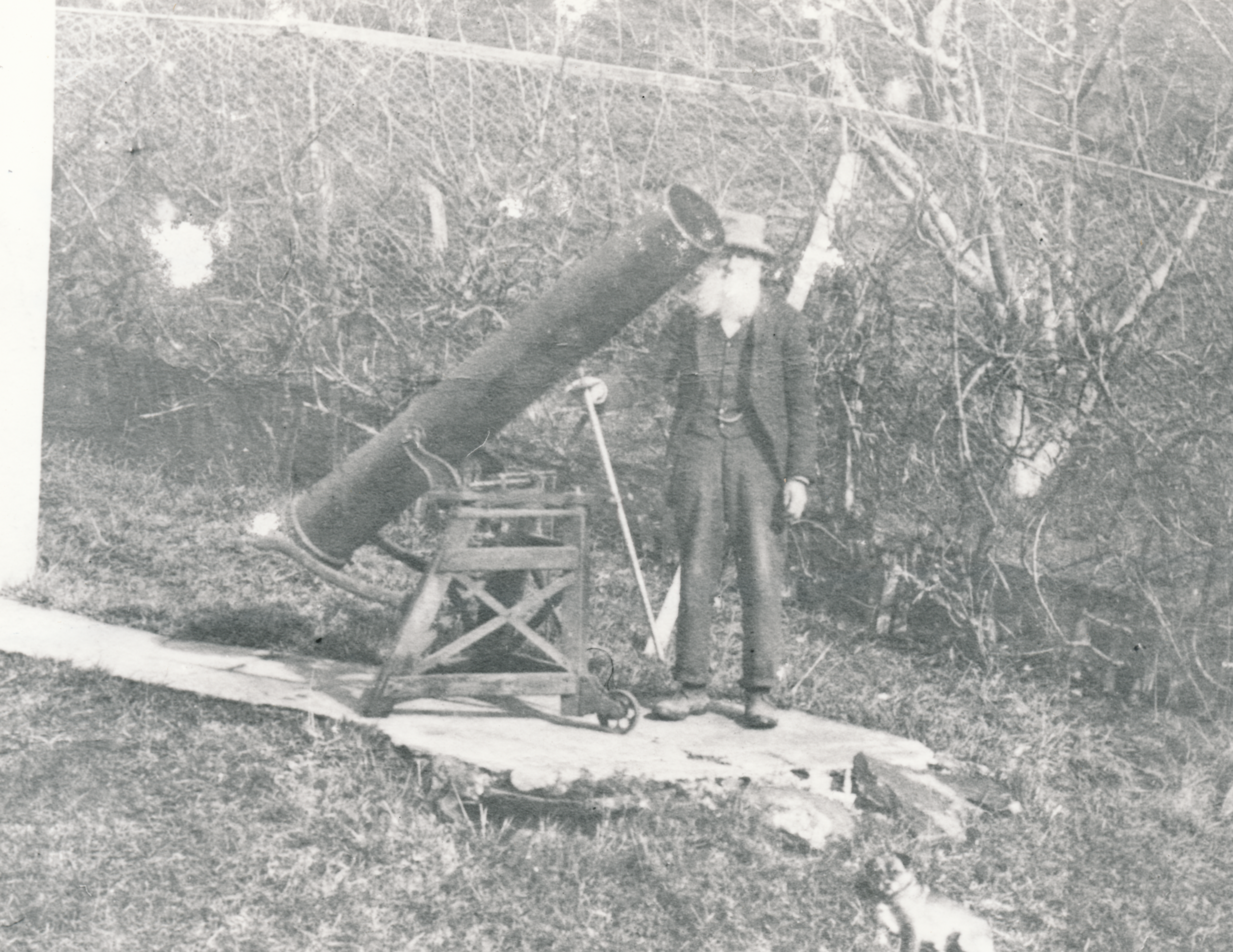
- Born: 25 April 1836; Butterwick, Lincolnshire, England, United Kingdom
- Died: 23 February 1914 (aged 77); Leith Valley, Dunedin, New Zealand
- Known for: Liquid Mirror Telescope
- Children: 1 (Henry Fawsit Skey)
- Scientific career
- Fields: Astronomer, Meteorologist
- Workplaces: Dunedin

Henry Skey (1836–1914) was an English surveyor, astronomer and meteorologist who emigrated from England to New Zealand in 1860 on the Evening Star with his elder brother, William Skey. He worked for the Government Survey Office before his retirement.

== Liquid Mirror Telescope ==
In 1872, he built the first prototype of a liquid-mirror telescope in Dunedin, New Zealand, announcing it in a letter to Nature in 1874. He was also father of the scientist Henry Fawsit Skey.

Skey constructed his first liquid mirror telescope in the 1850s, working independently. He constructed a 35-centimetre mirror from a bowl of mercury and showed that it could give clear images. Mercury was easily found in New Zealand, since it was used for gold extraction in the province of Otago, where Skey lived.

He showed his telescope model at a meeting of the Otago Institute in 1872, together with a written description and diagrams. His telescope incorporated a plane reflector, so that the view was not limited to the zenith, a typical issue for liquid telescopes.

== Publications ==
- Skey, Henry (1877). "Art. XVI.—Introduction of the Principle of the Gyroscope in Aerial Transit". Transactions and Proceedings of the Royal Society of New Zealand. 10: 176.
- Skey, Henry (1872). "Art. XI.—An Astronomical Telescope on a New Construction". Transactions and Proceedings of the Royal Society of New Zealand. 5: 119.
