= William Skey =

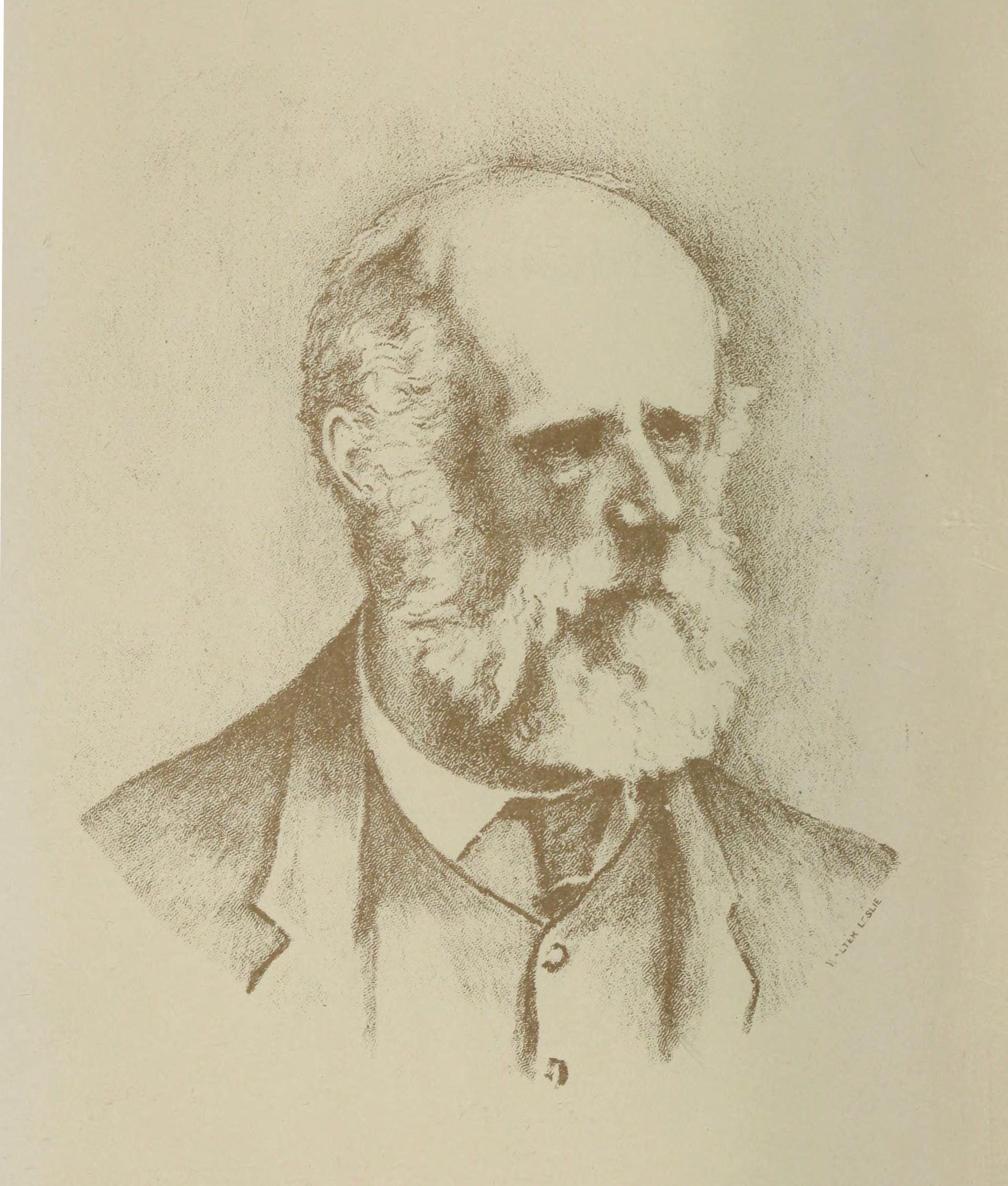
- Born: 8 April 1835
- Died: 4 October 1900 (aged 65)
- Occupation: Chemist
- Relatives: Henry Skey (brother)

William Skey (8 April 1835 – 4 October 1900) was a New Zealand chemist and poet. He was born in London, England, in 1835. He and his brother, the astronomer Henry Skey, emigrated to New Zealand in 1860.
