= New Plymouth Power Station =

Closed power station in New Zealand

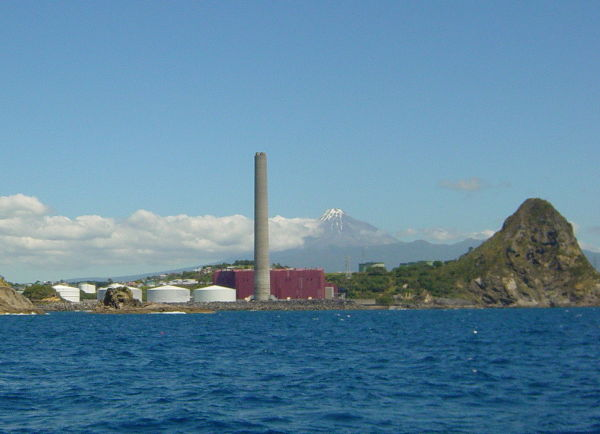
- The power station from the sea
- Country: New Zealand
- Location: Port Taranaki, New Plymouth, Taranaki
- Coordinates: 39°03′28″S 174°01′38″E
- Status: Decommissioned
- Commission date: 1974
- Decommission date: 2008
- Owner: Port Taranaki

Thermal power station
- Primary fuel: Natural gas
- Secondary fuel: Fuel oil

Power generation
- Units operational: 5
- Make and model: C A Parsons
- Nameplate capacity: 600 MW

External links
- Commons: Related media on Commons

The New Plymouth Power Station (NPPS) was a 600 MW thermal power station at New Plymouth, New Zealand, that operated from 1974 to 2008. Located at Port Taranaki, it was dual fuelled on natural gas and fuel oil. Constructed at a time of major hydro and HV transmission developments, it was New Zealand's first big thermal power station planned for continuous baseload operation.

The plant has been owned and operated (in turn) by NZED, NZE, ECNZ and Contact Energy. In 2013, the site was sold to Port Taranaki and Methanex.

== History ==
The power station project commenced in the 1960s, to meet rising electricity demand in New Zealand. Initially, fuel for this power station was to be coal, barged up from the West Coast, and the Port Taranaki site was chosen ahead of one at Wanganui. During early stages of the project, the Maui gas field was discovered off Taranaki. The plant design was changed to be dual fuel on either natural gas or heavy fuel oil.

The first unit was commissioned in February 1974, with the fifth unit coming on line in 1976. For the first few years, the plant ran on raw Kapuni gas. In 1979, the plant converted to Maui gas following the completion of the pipeline from Oaonui production station. The pipeline from Kapuni was re-purposed to supply Maui gas to Kapuni and onwards to the lower North Island.

The fuel oil capability was decommissioned in 1991, and reinstated in 2003.

Plant operation generally decreased from 1999, after the more efficient Otahuhu combined cycle power station was commissioned. However, the New Zealand power system derives over 60% of its electricity supply from hydro power stations and depends heavily on rainfall. NPPS has often played a vital role in dry years (such as 2001, 2003 and 2008), when hydro lake inflows were insufficient to meet demand.

Discovery of asbestos, not in an asbestos register, in thermal insulation during 2007 led to the decision by Contact Energy to close the power station.

In May 2008, one generating unit (unit 3) was temporarily recommissioned, with a capacity of 100 MW. This was in response to a nationwide electricity generation shortfall resulting from low hydro lake levels and is generally regarded as one of the most critical energy decisions ever made in New Zealand. This unit was shut down for decommissioning in December 2008.

In 2013, most of the site was sold to Port Taranaki, with Methanex purchasing a part of the site that held methanol tanks. In 2014 and 2015, the power station equipment was removed and the boiler house demolished, with all the plant, piping and structure being sold as scrap metal.

The national grid substation at the site remained in operation as part of the supply to the New Plymouth area until a network re-inforcement was completed to allow the substation to be de-commissioned. The transmission lines that previously connected the substation and power station to the national grid were eventually removed in 2023.

== Plant ==
The power station comprised five identical units, each rated at 120 MW. The boilers were provided by ICL of Derby UK, and the steam turbines were by C A Parsons of Newcastle, UK.

The boilers were balanced draught with tilting burners mounted in the corners of the furnace. Each boiler produced 376 tonnes/hour of steam at 120 bar and 538 °C, with one stage of reheat to 538 °C.

The steam turbines are 3000 rpm single-shaft, three-cylinder (HP, IP and LP) design, with six stages of feed heating. The condenser is a two-pass tubed design, using seawater as the coolant. The generators are two-poled, hydrogen cooled.

Condenser cooling is seawater, with a flow of 12,000 tonnes/hour for each unit.

The chimney is 198 m (650 ft) high, and contains five flues. It is the second tallest structure in New Zealand.

== See also ==
- List of power stations in New Zealand
- Electricity sector in New Zealand
- List of tallest structures in New Zealand
