= SKAI (band) =

Ukrainian pop rock band

SKAI СКАЙ
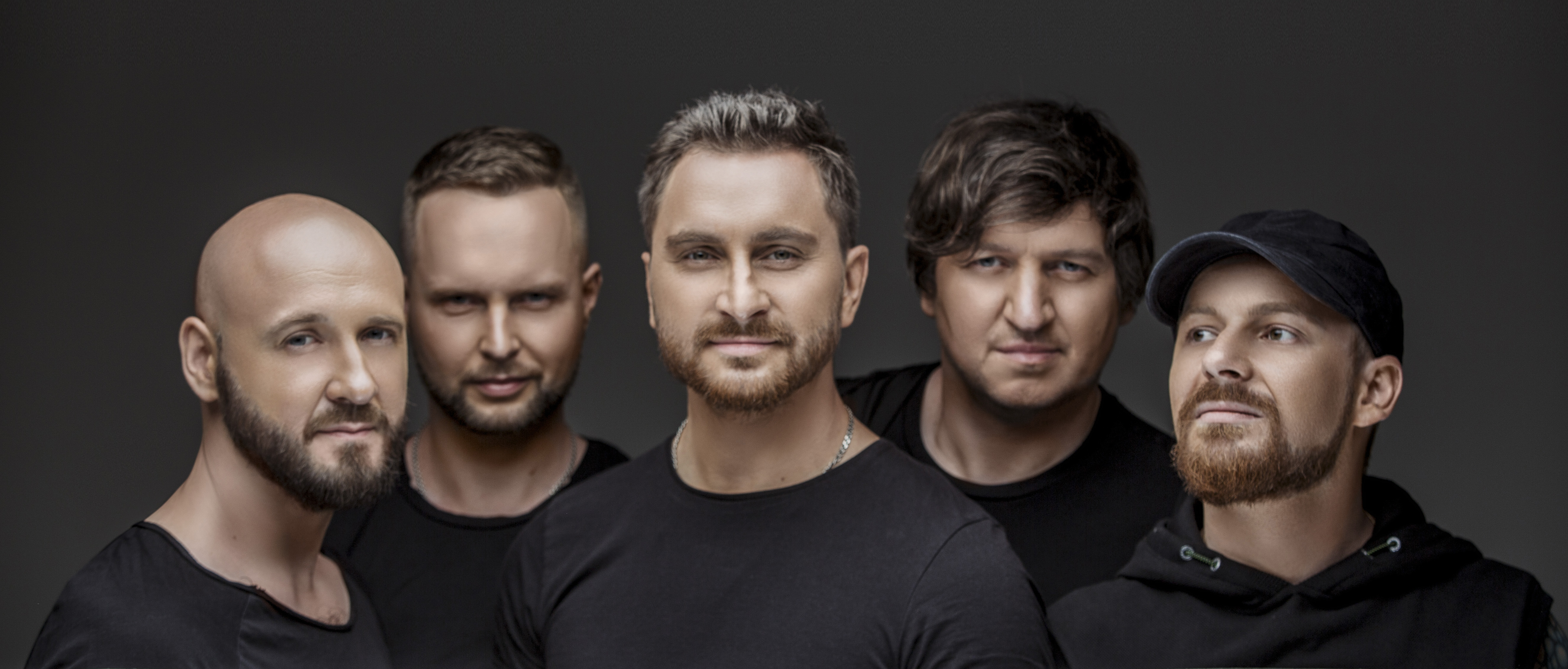
- SKAI band in 2016

Background information
- Origin: Ternopil, Ukraine
- Genres: Pop rock
- Years active: 2001 – present
- Label: Lavina
- Members: Oleh Sobchuk; Oleksandr Hryschuk; Yuriy Mozil; Oleksandr Druker; Artem Talanov; Serhiy Kameniev
- Website: skai.ua

SKAI (formerly named SKAY, Ukrainian: СКАЙ) is a Ukrainian pop rock band. It was formed in 2001 in Ternopil, Ukraine.

== History ==
=== Early years (2001–2005) ===
SKAI was formed in 2001 when Oleh Sobchuk and Oleksandr Hryshchuk were students in the Ternopil Galician College. Yuri Rudnytsky (bass guitar) and Serhiy Nedashkovsky (drums) became the other two members of the band. Yuriy Mozil (keyboards) became a participant in 2005.

After the band was formed, it started to give concerts and performed at several festivals, such as Perlyny Sezonu, Tavriyski Ihry, and Chervona Ruta. They became recognized by a broader audience after their appearance on the program Fresh Blood on the Ukrainian TV channel M1. The general director Eduard Klim from Lavina Music noticed them and signed them to his label.

=== Collaboration with Lavina Music (2005–2016) ===
In 2005, the name of the band was updated to be written with dots (S.K.A.I., Ukrainian: С. К. А. Й.). At the same time, the tracks that were later included in the album «It Can Kill You» («Тебе це може вбити») were released on 25 Ukrainian radio stations. Clips were shot for the song of the same name, as well as the songs «Remix» and «What is needed» («Те, що треба»). Sobchuk describes the track as a «romantic ballad.»

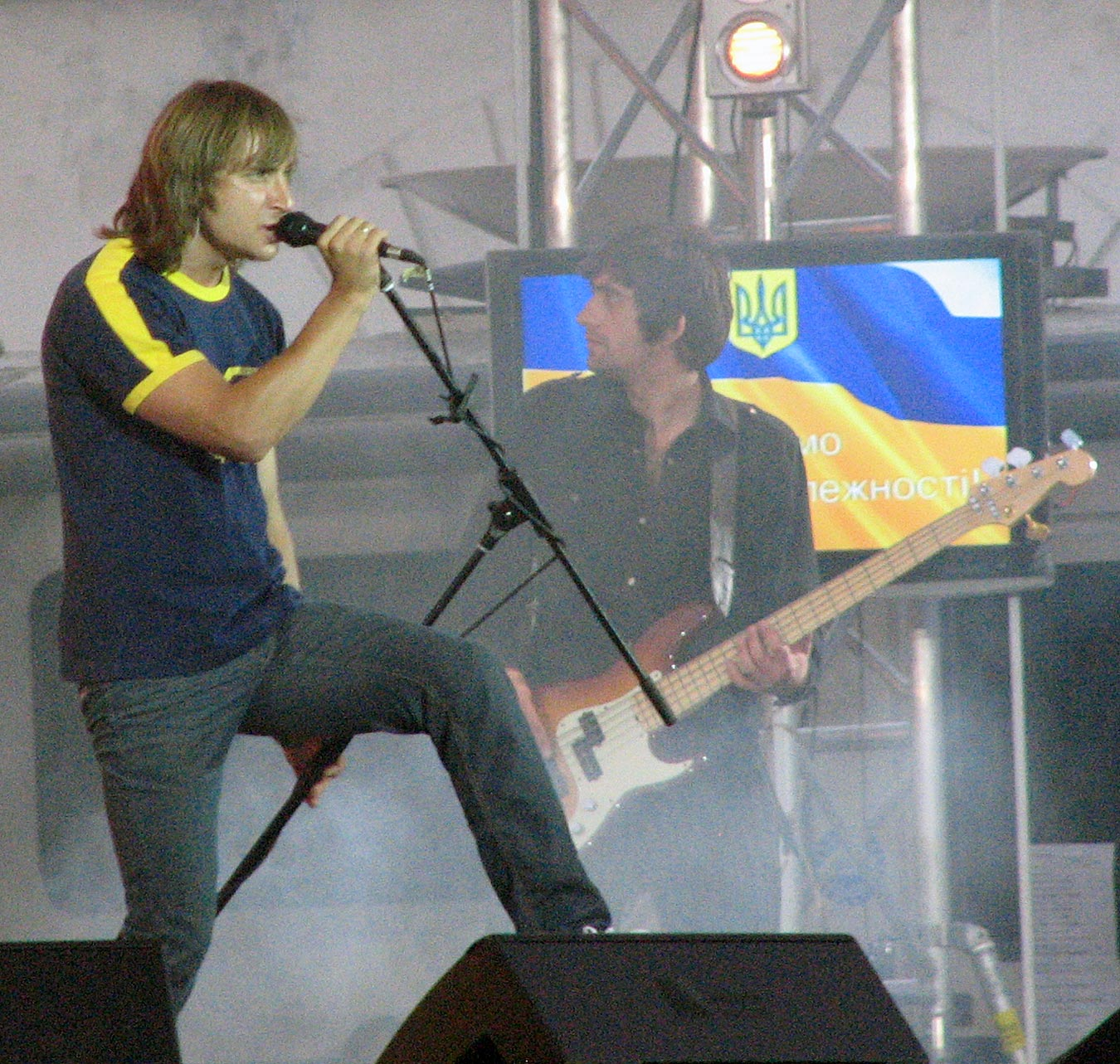
S.K.A.Y. at Maidan Nezalezhnosti, Kyiv on August 24, 2008.

In 2006, Lavina Music released a debut album «What You Need» («Те, що треба»). The tracks, that were later included in the album, were released on 25 Ukrainian radio stations. «It can kill you» («Тебе це може вбити») from this album became the visit card of the band and made it famous all over Ukraine. Soon the band released a music video for this song and other — «Remix» and «What you need» (Те, що треба) Oleh Sobchuk describes the last one as a romantic ballad.

The frontman Oleh Sobchuk in 2008 was awarded the medal of the Ukrainian Orthodox Church (Moscow Patriarchate) "1020 Years of Baptism of Rus" for his participation in the rock-tour with the same name.

In 2010 the third album called «!» («Exclamation mark») was released which includes tracks recorded by the duo with the Pikkardiyska Tertsiya and Green Gray. Найбільш популярні пісні — «Пам'ятай (Remember)», «Любов» (Love), «Світло» (Light) and title «!» (Exclamation mark). Arthur Danielyan became sound producer of the three first albums.

In 2011, the anniversary album «10» was released 2011. It was dedicated to the 10th anniversary of the band. The album includes the most famous tracks in group history. LP «Край Неба» («Edge of Heaven») was released in 2014. Most famous songs — «Струна» («String»), «I liked you» («Ти сподобалась мені»).

In October–November 2013 the group took part in agitational concerts "We are united", which were organized by pro-Russian politician Viktor Medvedchuk in Ukrainian cities.

Album «New Life» («Нове життя») released in 2016. Song «Melody of the Heart» («Мелодія серця») became the main soundtrack to the famous TV series in Ukraine Destiny Routes («Маршрути Долі»). Song «Wanted» became the soundtrack to the award-winning short film Wonderwall. The English version of the song is also called «Wonderwall».

==== Canadian Tour (2015) ====
In February 2015, the band conducted a charity tour of major Canadian cities: Winnipeg, Vancouver, Saskatoon, and Toronto. The musicians performed acoustic versions of their songs, and all the funds raised went to a charity fund for the victims of the Russian-Ukrainian war in eastern Ukraine.

==== European and American-Canadian Tour (2016) ====
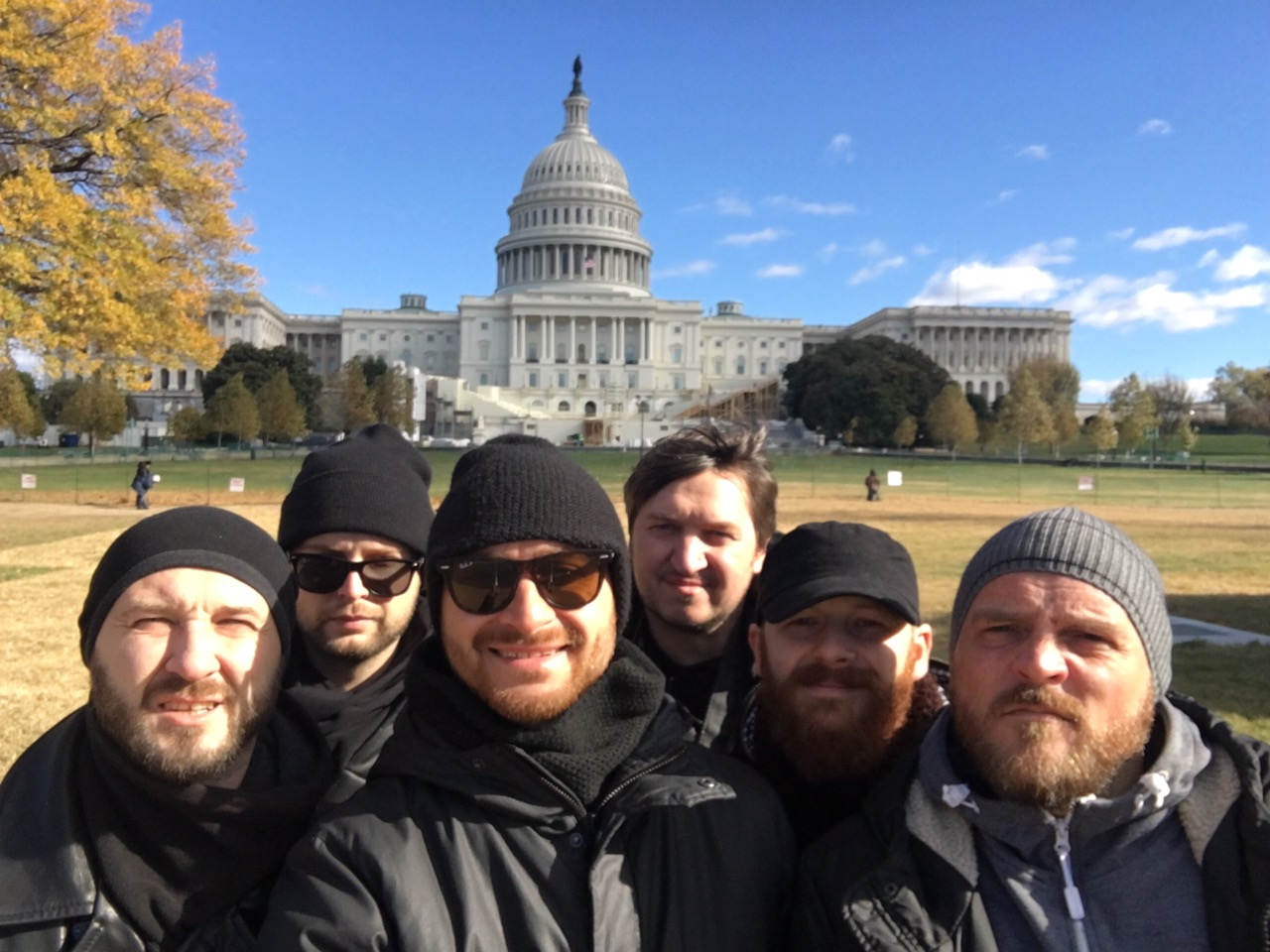
SKAI in Washington, 2016

November-December 2016 — as part of an international anniversary tour, the band visited 10 cities in the United States and Canada with a concert program «SKAI — New Life 15».

In addition to the main concert in Saskatoon on December 9, SKAI gave free acoustic mini-performances for 3 days and brought the Ukrainian song to a place where it had not been heard for a long time or had not been heard at all. The band members met with high school students from local Ukrainian schools. The meetings were organized with the assistance of the Saskatoon branch of the Ukrainian Canadian Congress.

February 2018 — concerts in Paris, London, and Dublin. November-December 2016 — as part of an international anniversary tour, the band visited 10 cities in the United States and Canada with a concert program «SKAI — New Life 15».

=== Own label (since 2017) ===
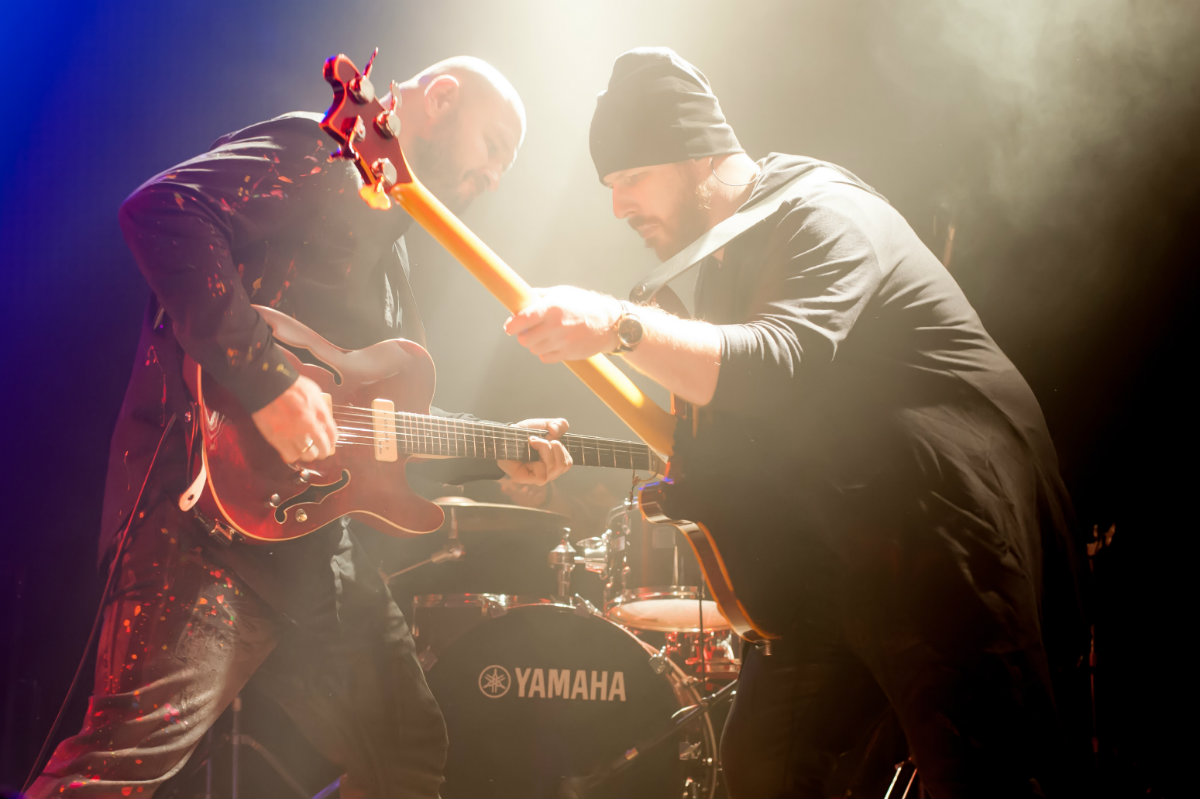
SKAI performing in Barcelona, January 21, 2017

In 2017 band created its own label, and officially changed its name from «S. K. A. I.» to «SKAI», removing the dots from the old name. In 2018, the album «Rare Birds» («Рідкісні птахи») was released. The music video for the song «Let's Run Away» was filmed in Los Angeles.

Also, In April 2018, was released the single «You Feel», which became part of the album «Rare Birds».

SKAI performed another US tour in 2018. In addition to the largest cities on the West Coast, SKAI has also given concerts in Portland, Los Angeles, and San Francisco.

==== Participation in Eurovision-2017 ====
The band was one of the contenders to represent Ukraine at the Eurovision Song Contest, which took place in Kyiv in May 2017. On January 27, 2017, the musicians presented the English-language song «All My Love For You», which took part in the voting, but did not make it to the semifinals. This is the English version of the single «I love you».

=== 2018–2020 ===
In April 2018, the single «You Feel» was released, which became part of the album «Rare Birds». In April-May 2018, the band conducted the second major tour of the United States and Canada. In April 2019, a video for the song «I would give everything» from the album «Rare Birds» was released.

In September 2019, Yevhen Kibelev left the band, and Artem Talanov took his place. In February 2020, the single «Take It» was released. On April 27, 2020, the band released the song «Do not retreat and do not give up», dedicated to Danylo Didyk, a public activist who was a victim of a terrorist attack at the age of 15 during the March of Unity in Kharkiv in February 2015.

=== 2021 ===
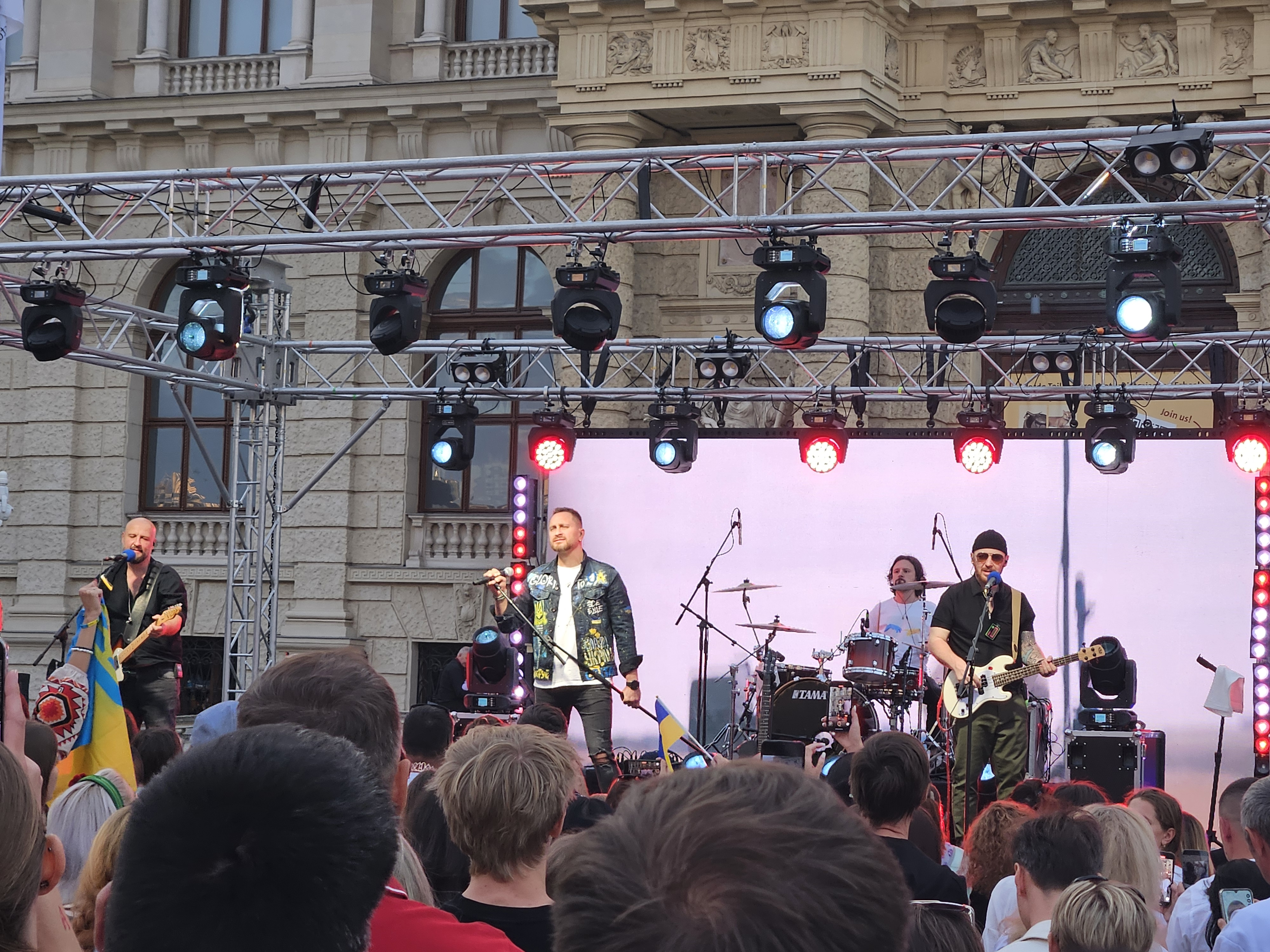
SKAI perform in Vienna, Austria for the Independence Day of Ukraine, Maria-Theresien-Platz, August 2025

«Skai 20», a compilation album was presented in early 2021. It includes the best songs for 20-year history of a band. The band took part in a concert in the largest Ukrainian stadium, the concert was dedicated to the 30th anniversary of Ukrainian independence held on August 24. SKAI performed «It can kill you» («Тебе це може вбити»)

The single "Wings" («Крила») released in autumn 2021 in collaboration with a symphonic orchestra. Also, a big SKAI concert took place in Kyiv dedicated to the 20th anniversary of the band in autumn 2021. The musicians performed 15 of their best known tracks accompanied by a symphonic orchestra and choir.

== Current members ==
- Oleh Sobchuk (since 2001) — lead vocal
- Oleksandr Hryschuk (since 2001) — guitar
- Yuriy Mozil (since 2005) — keyboards
- Oleksandr Druker (since 2014) — bass
- Artem Talanov (since 2019) — drums
- Sergiy Kameniev (since 2009) — FOH engineer

=== Former members ===
- Yuriy Rudnitskiy — bass guitar
- Sergiy Nedashkovskiy — drums
- Oleg Tarasenko — bass guitar
- Yuriy Bezverkhiy — drums
- Eugen Kibeliev — drums

== Discography ==
- 2006 — Te, shcho treba (Те, що треба)
- 2007 — Planeta S.K.A.I. (Планета С. К. А. Й.)
- 2010 — !
- 2014 — Kray neba (Край неба)
- 2016 — Нове життя (New Life)
- 2018 — Рідкісні птахи (Rare Birds)

== Awards ==
- 2008 — «NePopsa Awards» from Jam FM, best vocalist, best album
- 2008 — «Ukrainian Music Awards», best rock-band
- 2009 — «NePopsa Awards» from Jam FM, best music video, best concert tour
- 2010 — «Favorites of Success Awards» Best male band
- 2018 — «Best Music Awards», best album
- 2019 — «Myrtle Beach International Film Festival», best music video

== Charity ==
SKAI is known for its charitable events and initiatives. The income of many concerts was donated to sick children and war victims in eastern Ukraine. The band's frontman Oleh Sobchuk is also the founder of the «Подаруй Світло» («Give Light») Charitable Foundation, which helps raise funds for medical equipment for sick children.
