= Port Taranaki =

- Click on the map for a fullscreen view

Location
- Country: New Zealand
- Location: New Plymouth, New Zealand
- Coordinates: 39°03′S 174°02′E
- UN/LOCODE: NZTKI

Details
- Owned by: Taranaki Regional Council
- Type of harbour: Port
- No. of berths: 10
- Draft depth: 12.5 m.
- CEO: Simon Craddock

Statistics
- Website www.porttaranaki.co.nz

Port Taranaki is a port complex located in New Plymouth, New Zealand. It is the only deep water port on the west coast of New Zealand, and is owned by the Taranaki Regional Council. The port handles a wide range of coastal and international cargoes, mostly relating to the farming, engineering and petrochemical industries.

Adjacent features include the city of New Plymouth, the New Plymouth Power Station and the Sugar Loaf Islands Marine Protected Area (SLIMPA).

== History ==
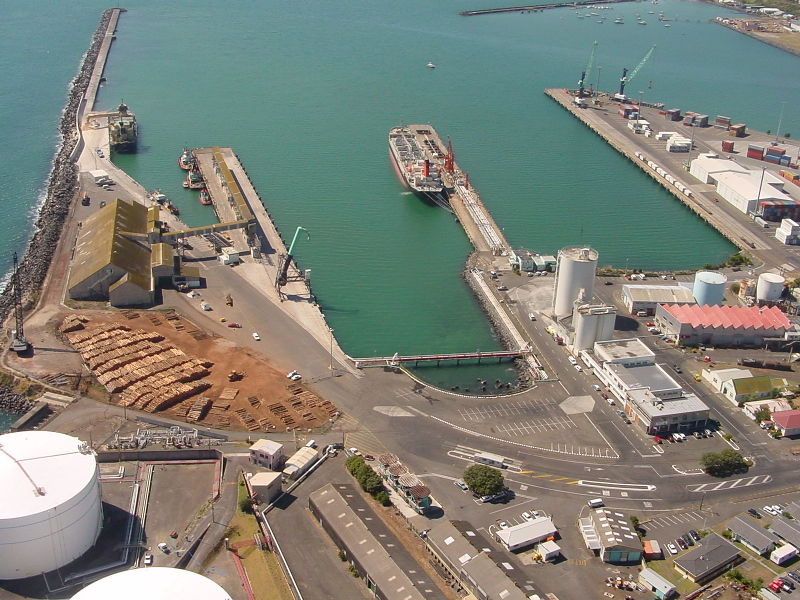
Port Taranaki in 2003

The port was established in 1875, and construction of the main breakwater began in 1881 with Frederic Carrington ceremoniously laying the first stone.

In 2007, Port Taranaki became the first port in New Zealand to receive official recognition for its harbour safety management systems.

In 2013, the port purchased most of the site of the decommissioned New Plymouth Power Station. This site is adjacent to the port and provided an additional 18 ha of land.

In 2016, the port became the first port in New Zealand to be smoke free.

In 2017, the port purchased a new tug boat Kinaki which replaced a 45-year-old vessel Kupe. It joined a fleet of two other tugs Tukana and Rupe. Tug Karoo replaced the Rupe in 2024.
