= East Cape to Cape Egmont Traverse =

Hiking trail in New Zealand

The East Cape to Cape Egmont Traverse is a pilgrimage in New Zealand that holds historical and cultural significance. Two authors have documented their experiences in books: Raymond Salisbury's "Cape to Cape – 80 Day Traverse of the North Island" and A.H. Reed's "From East Cape to Cape Egmont On Foot at Eighty-six" (1st Edition 1962).

The traverse involves a pilgrimage through the landscapes where early pioneers once tread. A.H. Reed, at the age of 86, undertook the traverse, opting for a route along the east coast beaches before heading west inland, avoiding the challenging Raukumara Range Forest Park route.

== Proposed Cape Egmont to East Cape walkway ==
In the late 1970s, the now disestablished Department of Survey and Land Information commenced a project to link Cape Egmont to East Cape by a walkway.

One section of the ‘Cape Egmont to East Cape’ walkway was completed and still remains in use:

- Matemateāonga Range Track – a traditional Māori trail, then a dray track in the early 20th century.

== Cycle tour ==
In the February of 2020, the North Island traverse was completed as the "Kopiko Aotearoa" cycle tour:

West – east route:

Cape Egmont – Te Rewa Rewa Bridge – Hobbit Hole – Mangamataha Bridge – Centre of the North Island – Waiotapu – Ruatāhuna – Lake Waikaremoana – Rere rock-slide – Motu Road – Bay of Plenty – East Cape Lighthouse

East – West route:

East Cape Lighthouse – Bay of Plenty – Motu Road – Rere rock-slide – Lake Waikaremoana – Ruatāhuna – Waiotapu – Centre of the North Island – Mangamataha Bridge – Hobbit Hole – Te Rewa Rewa Bridge – Cape Egmont
