= Waiwhakaiho River =

River in New Zealand

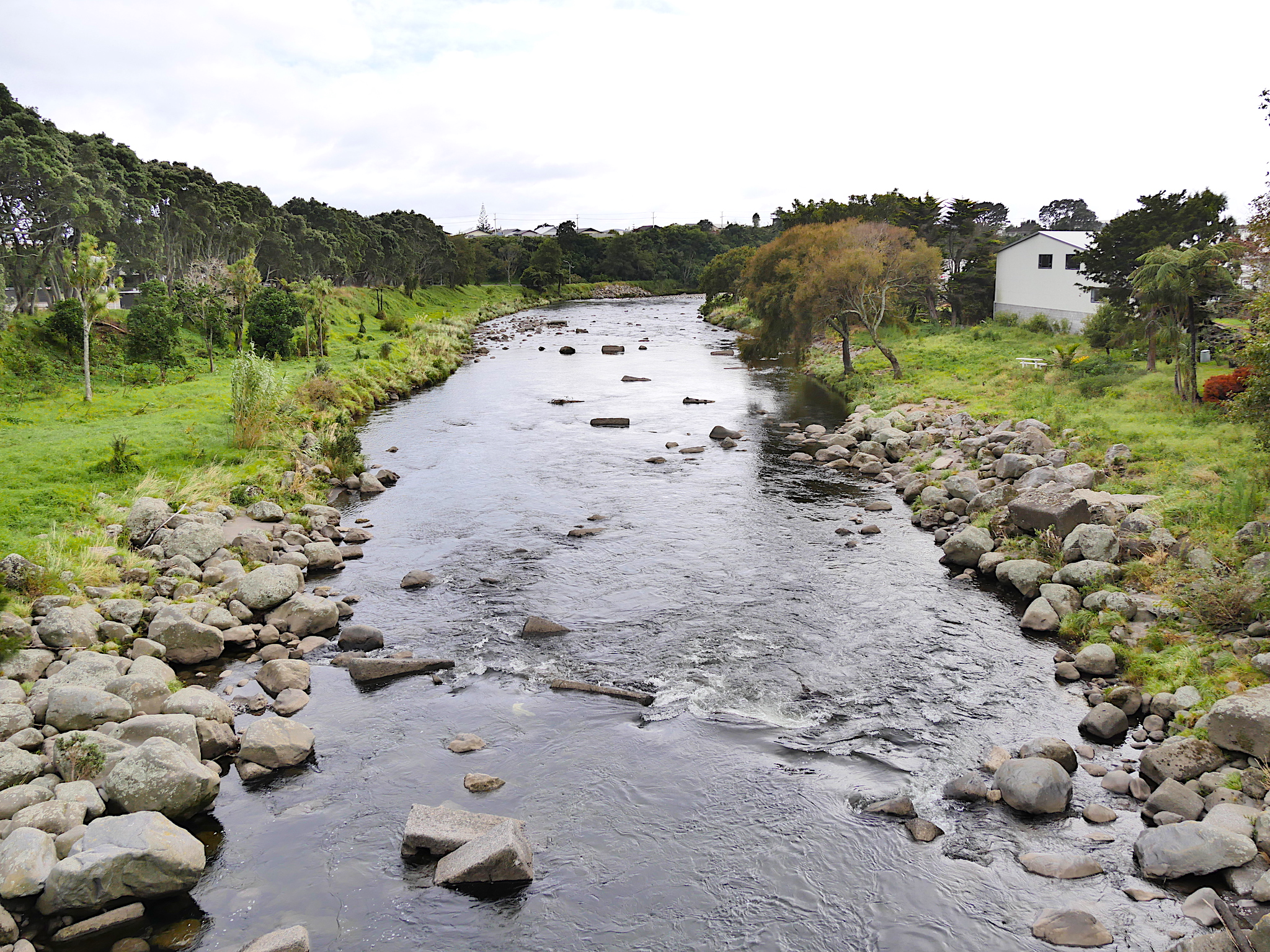
- Waiwhakaiho River near Fitzroy, New Plymouth
- Route of the Waiwhakaiho River
- Mouth of the Waiwhakaiho River Waiwhakaiho River (North Island)

Location
- Country: New Zealand

Physical characteristics
- Source
  - location: Mount Taranaki
  - coordinates: 39°17′17″S 174°04′15″E
  - elevation: 2,000 m (6,600 ft)
- Mouth
  - location: North Taranaki Bight
  - coordinates: 39°02′14″S 174°06′26″E
  - elevation: 0 m (0 ft)
- Length: 30 km (19 mi)
- Basin size: 136 km^{2} (53 sq mi)

Basin features
- Progression: Waiwhakaiho River → North Taranaki Bight → Tasman Sea
- Tributaries
  - left: Kokowai Stream, Karaka Tonga Stream, Kai Auahi Stream, Mangamahoe Stream, Mangorei Stream
  - right: Ram Stream, Camp Stream, Araheke Stream, Mangaone Stream
- Bridges: Te Rewa Rewa Bridge

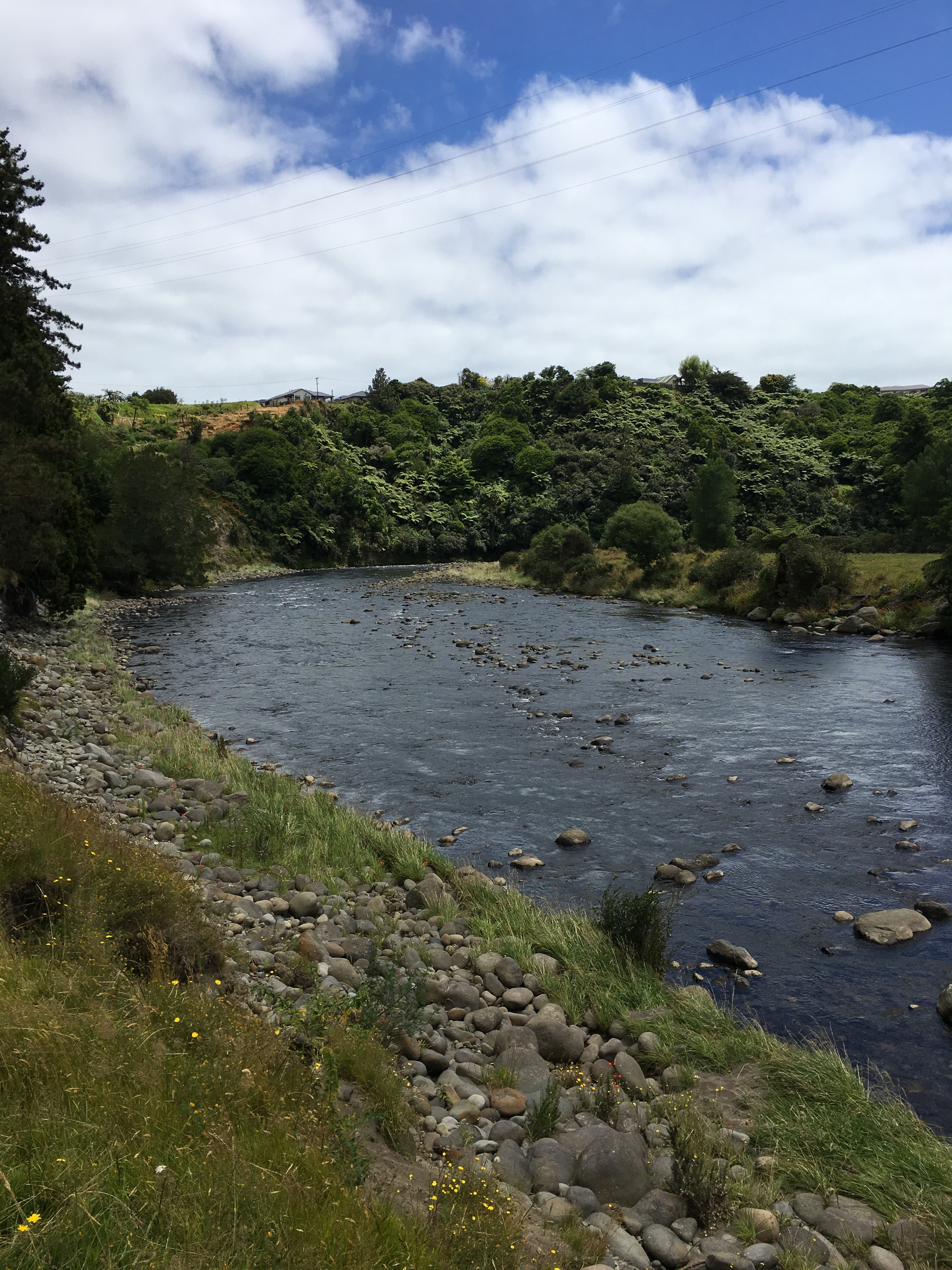
The Waiwhakaiho River from the river flat at Tupare Gardens (January 2017)

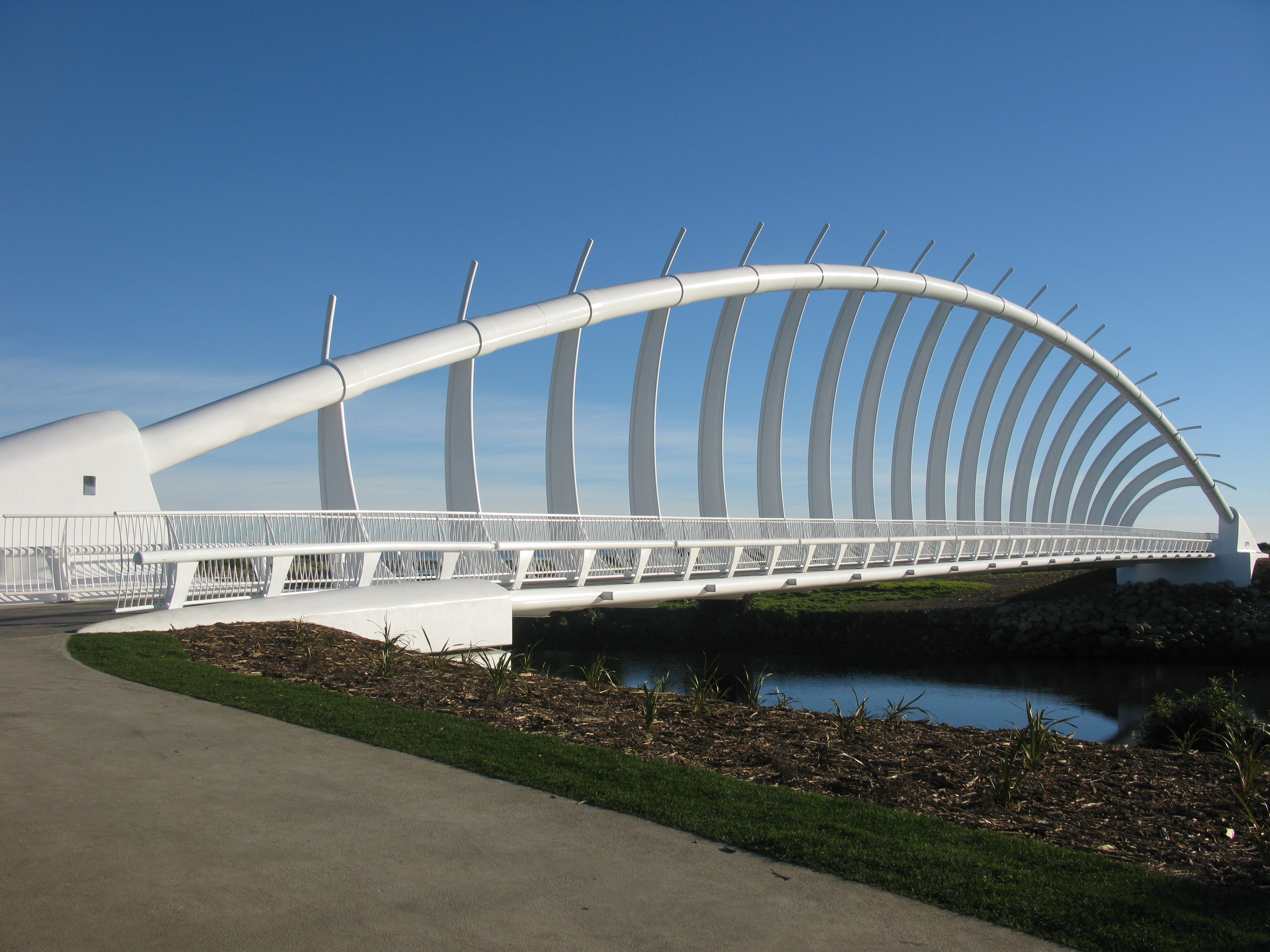
Te Rewa Rewa Bridge over the Waiwhakaiho River

The Waiwhakaiho River is a river of the Taranaki Region of New Zealand's North Island. One of many rivers and streams radiating from the slopes of Taranaki/Mount Egmont, it flows initially northeast before veering northwest to reach the Tasman Sea close to the New Plymouth suburb of Fitzroy. Near the sea, it is crossed by the coastal walkway, connecting New Plymouth with Bell Block via the Te Rewa Rewa Bridge.

The river is also bridged by SH3 and the Marton–New Plymouth railway line.

== See also ==
- List of rivers of New Zealand
