= Alfred Hamish Reed =

Alfred Hamish Reed CBE
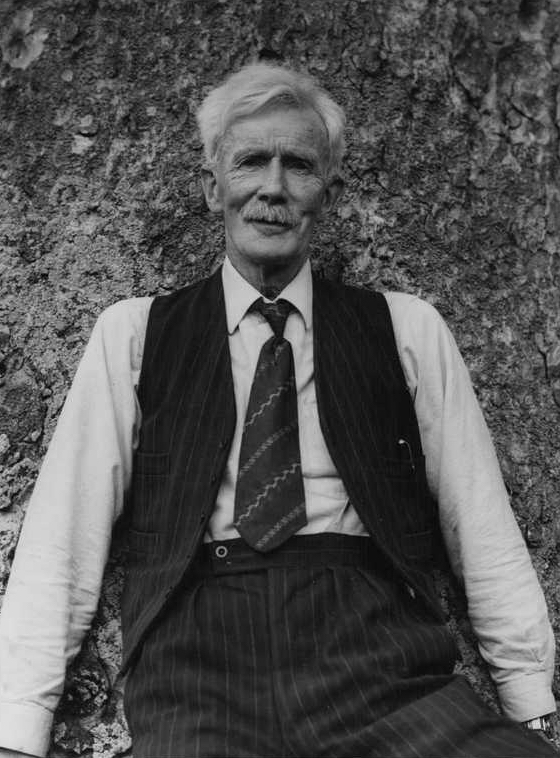
- Reed photographed by Tudor Washington Collins
- Born: Alfred Hamish Reed; 30 December 1875; Hayes, Middlesex, England
- Died: 15 January 1975 (aged 99); Dunedin, New Zealand
- Resting place: Dunedin Northern Cemetery
- Occupations: publisher; writer; entrepreneur
- Spouse: Harriet Isabel Fisher

Sir Alfred Hamish Reed CBE (30 December 1875 – 15 January 1975), generally known as A.H. Reed, was a New Zealand publisher, author and entrepreneur.

== Early life ==
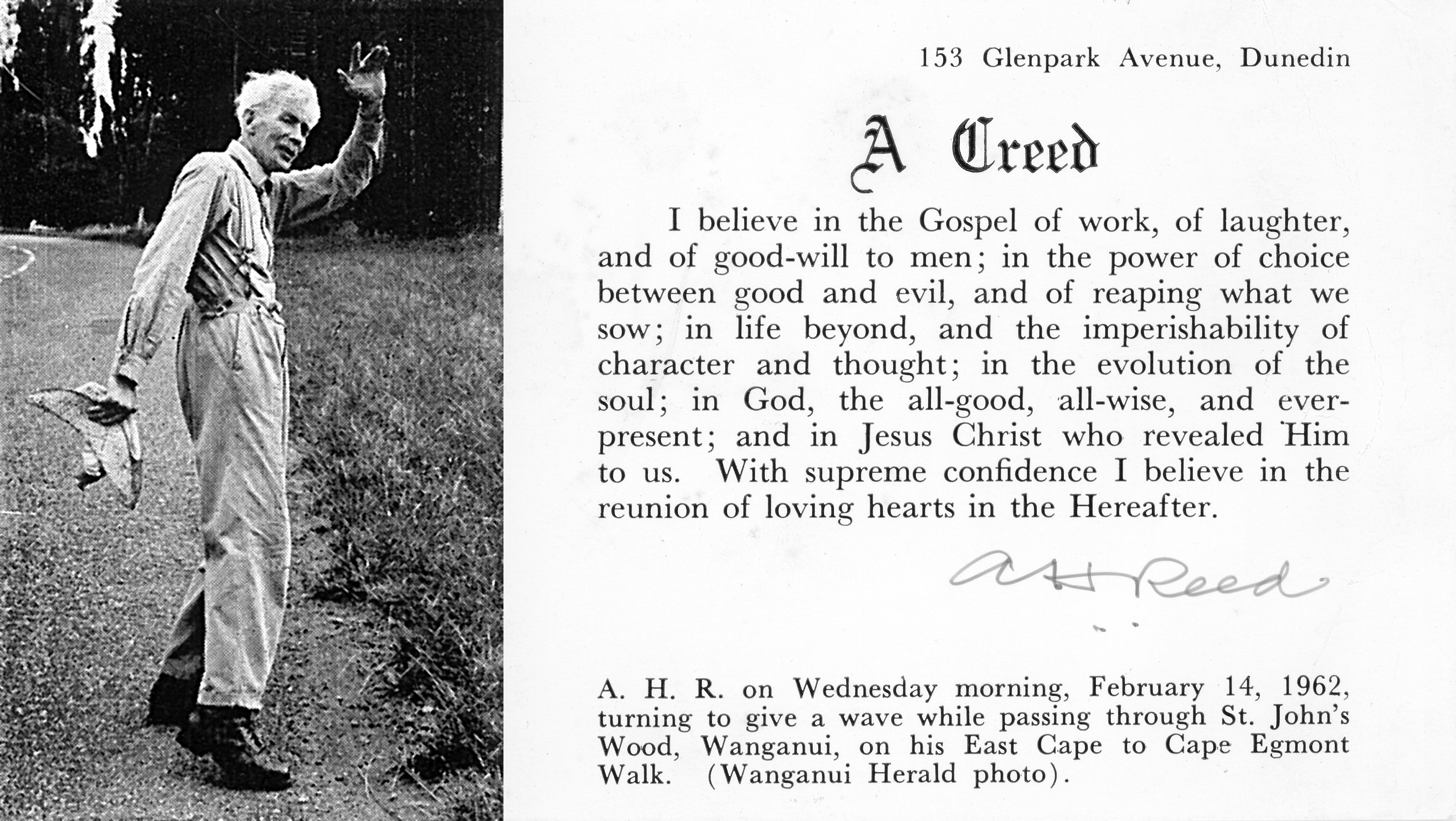
Card distributed by AH Reed to people he met, especially on his long-distance walks, early 1960s

Alfred Hamish Reed was born at Hayes, Middlesex, in England on 30 December 1875, the son of James William Reed and Elizabeth Reed. He was the second oldest of four children to parents who were devout Baptists and raised their children accordingly. His father James managed a brick field but in 1882 purchased his own brick business in Walthamstow and moved his family to the area. Alfred Reed was educated at a small private school and then, from 1883, Maynard Road School. The family were all avid readers, and for Reed, books would prove to be a lifelong passion.

By 1886, James Reed's brick business was failing and had to close. This prompted him to migrate with his family to New Zealand. His maternal uncle lived there, in Motueka, and reported favourably on New Zealand in his letters to his sister, Alfred's mother. After a six-week voyage aboard the Arawa, the family arrived in Wellington in April 1887. They promptly travelled north to settle in Auckland but James Reed struggled to find employment. He eventually found work as a kauri gum digger in Northland while his family remained in Auckland. Elizabeth Reed supplemented the family's income through needlework. After several months, there was enough money to buy a block of land at Parahaki, to the east of Whangārei and the family moved there in late December 1887.

Living conditions were crude and the family lived simply, the parents instilling a strong work ethic in their children. Unable to find a Baptist church to attend, the family went to a Wesleyan Methodist church. They rejected an Anglican church that was closer to their home on the grounds that it was too conformist. Alfred Reed attended Whangarei Primary School from early 1888 but was soon withdrawn from it in favour of another school, operated on a part-time basis. Later in the year, he severely injured his leg to the point of being bedridden, with local doctors unable to diagnose the problem for 12 months. He was later sent to hospital in Auckland where infection of the femur bone was diagnosed. He stayed in hospital for a year, away from his parents who were unable to afford to visit him, and underwent three operations. He was eventually discharged in July 1890.

Returning to live with his parents, Reed was conscious of the burden that the expense of his medical care had caused his parents and in light of this, he decided to start working on the kauri gum fields alongside his father rather than finish his schooling. The work was hard, involving the extraction of gum from the ground and packing it. He also worked on the family's farmlet and would take occasional jobs cutting scrub or working on road construction. Realising he needed a skill to further himself, he decided to learn Pitman's shorthand; he hoped that this would lead to a career as a reporter.

== Working in Auckland ==
By late 1895 Reed had become so proficient in shorthand he was sufficiently confident to go to Auckland to look for reporting work. Approaches made to the New Zealand Herald and the Auckland Star were turned down so he took the opportunity to take typewriter lessons. For accommodation, he boarded with a couple who lived on Karangahape Road and made the acquaintance of their daughter, Harriet Isabel Fisher. Like Reed, she and her parents were English immigrants who had settled in Auckland in 1885. Known to Reed as Belle, she was nine years older and a devout Wesleyan Methodist.

At the typewriting school, he made the acquaintance of T. G. DeRenzy, the co-owner and manager of the New Zealand Typewriter Company, who at the end of the year offered Reed a job as a shorthand writer and message boy. He soon parted ways with his employer to take up an Auckland agency for Remington Typewriter Company but this proved short-lived. In June 1896, he returned to the New Zealand Typewriter Company. He soon progressed from doing shorthand work to travelling around the North Island, selling and repairing typewriters. Impressed by Reed's work ethic, honesty and diligence, DeRenzy offered him the opportunity to set up an office for the company in Dunedin, a challenge that Reed accepted.

== Life in Dunedin ==
In October 1897, Reed moved to Dunedin to start in his new role. In doing so he left behind a fiancée, having proposed to Belle earlier that year. The couple had decided Belle would stay in Auckland since they could not afford to marry. Reed quickly found suitable premises for the company's office and began retailing and repairing typewriters. Despite some hiccups, he soon began building the business and took on staff. After a year in Dunedin, and having secured a payrise, Reed returned to Auckland and married Belle at Pitt Street Methodist Church on 28 January 1899. The couple immediately travelled to Dunedin where they rented a house and settled down to life together. They lived simply and quietly, doing most things together although Reed would indulge in long solitary walks.

Reed continued to work on developing the Dunedin branch, which would prove to be the only profitable office for the New Zealand Typewriter Company. The couple were also heavily involved in church life; Reed took charge of a Sunday School class at the Methodist Trinity Church and in 1898 qualified as a preacher. Two years later, he took over as superintendent of the Sunday School, which had a roll of 250 children, with Belle keeping the accounts. Short of teaching materials, Reed began importing books and literature from suppliers in the United States. Initially this was for his own school but soon other churches in Dunedin showed interest and Reed started supplying them with excess material from his own orders. He and Belle soon expanded this into a nationwide mail order business.

In the meantime, DeRenzy wound up the New Zealand Typewriter Company but before doing so allowed Reed to purchase the Dunedin office on favourable terms. He and Belle continued to work on his mail order business, working out of a room at his office, with the sale and maintenance of typewriters providing regular income in the interim. While the financial reward of his day job was appreciated, Reed's passion was religious education and he saw his mail order business as doing God's work. By 1911, turnover for the business, which they called Sunday School Supply Stores, had reached £1,000 a year. On reaching this milestone, Reed sold his typewriter business to focus solely on the mail order business.

Sunday School Supply Stores provided a range of goods, from cards, badges, clocks, hymn sheets, blackboards and the like to religious games, as well as Bibles, tracts and testaments. Reed also launched into the book trade, supplying religious works for presentation to children as prizes. These were sourced from local representatives of overseas publishing houses. He took up the New Zealand agency for teaching materials for Sunday school teachers produced by an English publisher, and also was the local agent for a company that purchased religious books as publishers' remainders.

== First World War ==
On the outbreak of the First World War, Reed joined the Territorial Force, New Zealand's part-time military reserve. While his business took up his working days, he trained in army techniques and weaponry. By 1916, with New Zealand soldiers now serving on the Western Front and in the Sinai and Palestine theatre of operations, Reed felt it his duty to volunteer for the New Zealand Expeditionary Force (NZEF) for service aboard. Assessed as sufficiently fit for overseas service, he and Belle sold the Sunday School Supply Stores business. This allowed him to clear the mortgage on the couple's residence, which they had purchased in 1901. Belle stayed on at the business, working for the new owner.

Reed reported for duty on 21 September 1916, and was sent to Trentham Military Camp near Wellington for training. His contingent, the 21st Reinforcements, was the last group where all the recruits were volunteers. The New Zealand Government was to shortly introduced conscription to help maintain the flow of manpower to the NZEF. After a short period of training at Trentham, a further, more intensive, programme of training commenced at Featherston Military Camp in the Wairarapa. With his strong Christian background, Reed found some aspects of military life difficult, particular the language and lurid storytelling that would occur in the camp's huts at night. He urged his fellow soldiers to avoid alcohol, blasphemy and to refrain from cursing. He even distributed a short tract to his hut mates suggesting that if they felt the need to curse, to substitute 'crimson' or 'purple' for swear words. Reed later recounted hearing a non-commissioned officer referring to a soldier as a 'crimson cow'.

The 21st Reinforcements were scheduled to depart overseas in early 1917 but in December 1916, Reed's shorthand skills were discovered and he was asked to volunteer for the headquarters staff at Featherston Camp. He declined, preferring to go on active duty aboard, but was overruled and ordered to report to the camp's headquarters. Reed was dissatisfied with his posting, seeing it as one that could be easily fulfilled by a medically unfit man while he should be doing his duty at the frontlines.

== Publishing ==
Reed entered the bookselling trade when he founded the firm of A. H. and A. W. Reed (later known as Reed Publishing (NZ) Ltd.), a leading publisher of New Zealand-related non-fiction and reference works, in association with his nephew Alexander Wyclif Reed. In 1932, he branched out as a publisher and in 1935 he became an author.

== Walking and climbing ==
Reed also undertook walking and mountain-climbing expeditions. He climbed Mount Taranaki/Egmont (aged 80), Mount Ruapehu (aged 83), Ngauruhoe (aged 85), walked from North Cape to Bluff, (a similar national walking trail is now possible in the form of Te Araroa) (aged 85) and from East Cape to Cape Egmont (aged 86), walked through Marlborough (aged 87) and through Otago, Canterbury, Westland, and the Haast (aged 88).

== Philanthropy ==
In 1938 Reed and his wife established the Alfred and Isabel and Marian Reed Trust for the promotion of Christianity, education, literature and philanthropy for the people of New Zealand. The trust has amassed a collection of rare books and manuscripts for the Dunedin Public Libraries, including one of the most comprehensive collections of manuscripts and early printed Bibles in the Southern Hemisphere.

== Honours ==
In the 1948 King's Birthday Honours Reed was appointed a Member of the Order of the British Empire (MBE) for services in connexion with publication of historical and other New Zealand works. He was promoted to Commander of the same Order (CBE) in the 1962 New Year Honours, in recognition of his contribution as a writer and publisher of New Zealand historical works. In the 1974 Queen's Birthday Honours, Reed was appointed a Knight Bachelor, for services to literature and culture.

== Death and legacy ==
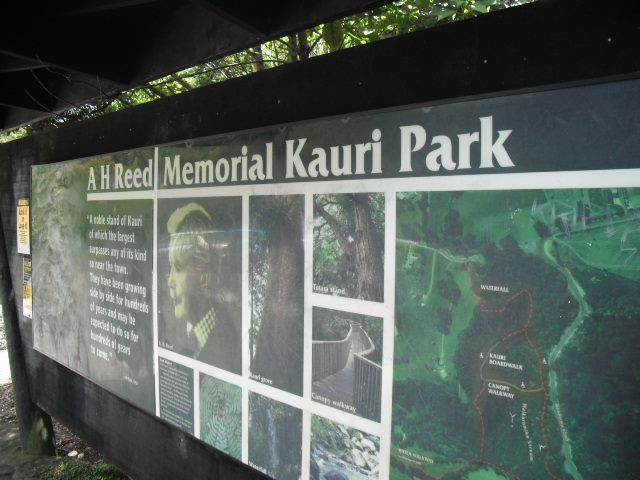
Signboard at the entrance to A.H. Reed Memorial Kauri Park, Whangārei

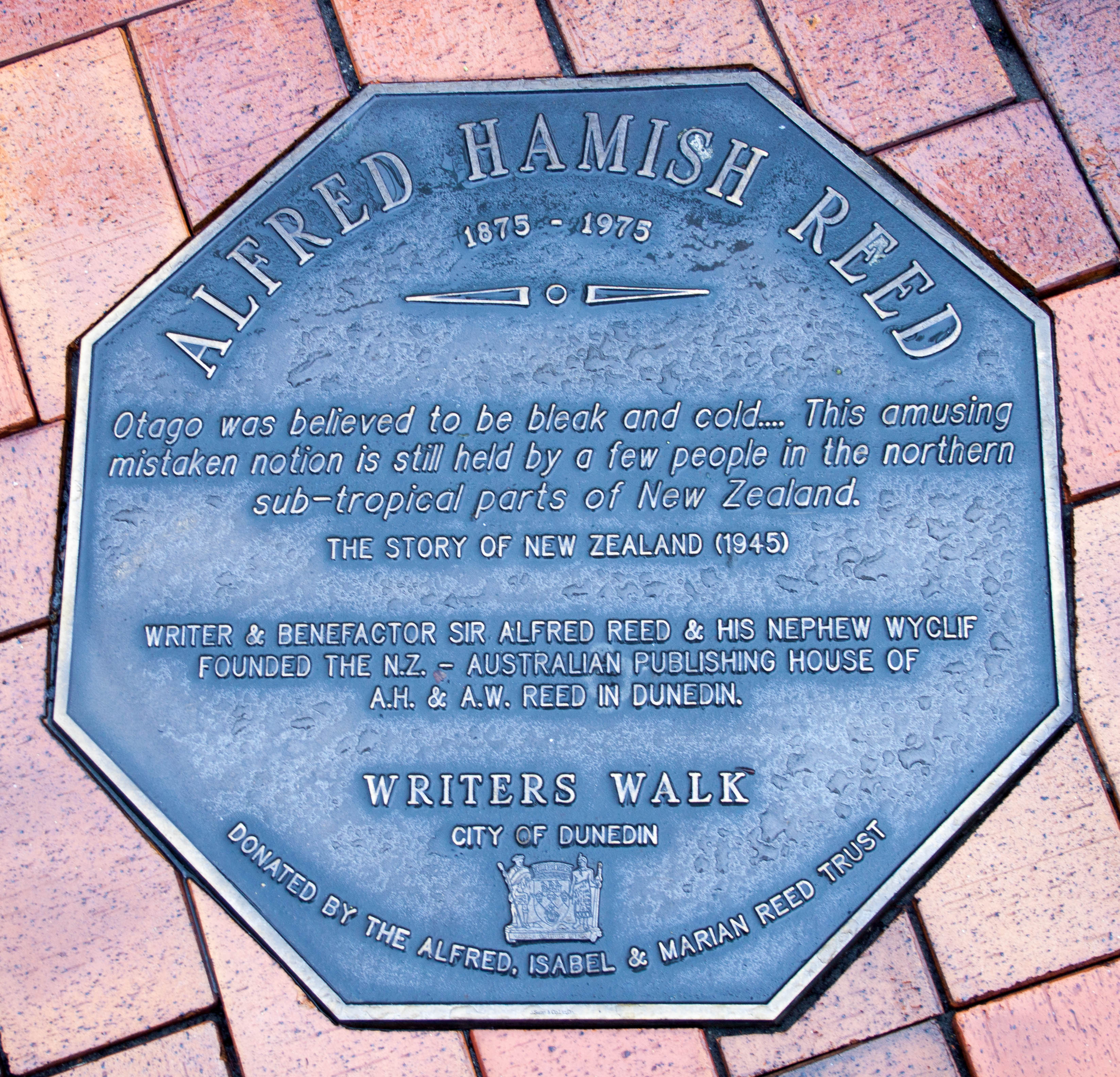
Memorial plaque dedicated to Alfred Hamish Reed in Dunedin, on the Writers' Walk on the Octagon

Reed died at Dunedin on 15 January 1975, and his ashes were buried at Dunedin Northern Cemetery. Soon after the death of his uncle, Clif Reed wrote a short book of his experiences working with him. This was published as Young Kauri later that year. The publishing institution that he set up was eventually sold in 1983 to the Australian company Associated Book Publishers.

There are several memorials in Reed's memory: The A. H. Reed Memorial Kauri Park Scenic Reserve, near Whangārei, commemorates his association with the district, while there is a memorial plaque dedicated to him in Dunedin's Octagon.

In 1997, Reed was inducted into the New Zealand Business Hall of Fame.

== Published works ==
Reed wrote a number of books, including:

- First New Zealand Christmases (1933) with Alexander Reed
- Marsden of Maoriland: Pioneer and Peacemaker (1938)
- Two Maoriland Adventurers: Marsden and Selwyn (1939) with Alexander Reed
- The Isabel Reed Bible Story Book (1939)
- All Time Tales (1943) with Alexander Reed
- Greatheart of Maoriland (1944)
- The Story of New Zealand (1945)
- Great Barrier: Isle of Enchantment (1946)
- Farthest East: Afoot in Maoriland Byways (1946)
- Farthest North: Afoot in Maoriland Byways (1946)
- The Story of Otago; Age of Adventure (1947)
- The Gumdigger: The Story of Kauri Gum (1948)
- The Story of Canterbury: Last Wakefield Settlement (1949)
- John Jones of Otago: Whaler, Coloniser, Shipowner, Merchant (1949) with Alfred Eccles
- Everybody's Story of New Zealand (1950)
- Coromandel Holiday (1952)
- The Story of the Kauri (1953)
- The Four Corners of New Zealand (1954)
- The Story of Northland (1956)
- The Story of Early Dunedin (1956)
- The Story of Northland (1956)
- The House of Reed: Fifty Years of New Zealand Publishing 1907-1957 (1957) with Alexander Reed
- Walks in Maoriland Byways (1958)
- The Story of Hawke's Bay (1958)
- Heroes of Peace and War in Early New Zealand (1959)
- The Story of Kauri Park (1959)
- Historic Bay of Islands (1960) with John Alexander
- From North Cape to Bluff: On Foot at Eighty-five (1961)
- Explorers of New Zealand (1961)
- From East Cape to Cape Egmont On Foot at Eighty-six (1962)
- Marlborough Journey (1963)
- The New Story of The Kauri (1964)
- The Friendly Road: On Foot through Otago, Canterbury, Westland and the Haast (1964)
- Nelson Pilgrimage (1965)
- The Milford Track (1965)
- Sydney-Melbourne Footslogger (1966)
- A. H. Reed: An Autobiography (1967)
- Historic Northland (1968)
- Family Life in New Zealand 1880–1890 (1969)
- The Gumdiggers: The Story of Kauri Gum (1972)
- Pakeha and Maori at War 1840 to 1870 (1972)
- Ben and Eleanor Ben Farjeon and Dunedin (1973)
- The Happy Wanderer: A Kiwi on Foot 1915-1961 (1974)

He also edited several books, including:

- Early Maoriland Adventures of J. W. Stack (1935)
- More Maoriland Adventures of J. W. Stack (1936)
- Further Maoriland Adventures of J. W. and E. Stack (1938)
- Captain Cook in New Zealand: Extracts from the Journals of Captain James Cook giving a full account in his own words of his adventures and discoveries in New Zealand (1951) with Alexander Reed
- With Anthony Trollope in New Zealand (1969)

== See also ==
- Reed Publishing
