= Dunedin Public Libraries =

Public library system in New Zealand

Dunedin Public Libraries Kā Kete Wānaka O Ōtepoti (Māori)
- Location: Dunedin, New Zealand
- Established: 1908
- Branches: 6 + 2 mobile

Collection
- Size: 700,000 items

Other information
- Website: www.dunedinlibraries.govt.nz

Dunedin Public Libraries is a network of six libraries and two bookbuses in Dunedin, New Zealand, owned and operated by the Dunedin City Council. The Libraries' collection includes over 700,000 items, and around 30,000 books and audiovisual items plus 15,000 magazines are added each year. Members can borrow or return items from any library or bookbus in the network.

== Branch history ==
Dunedin Public Libraries operates six libraries and two bookbus services.

=== City Library ===
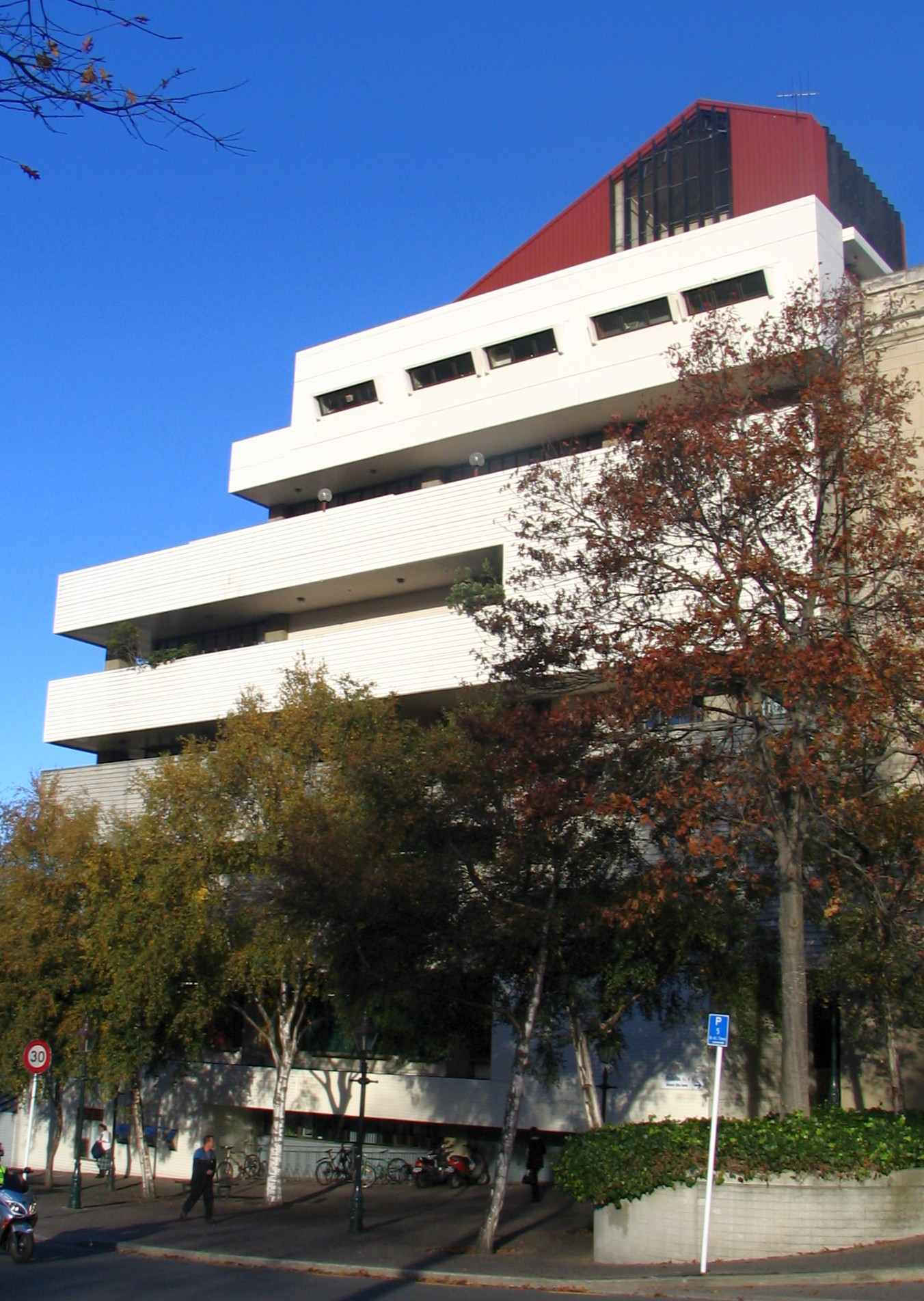
City Library looking southeast

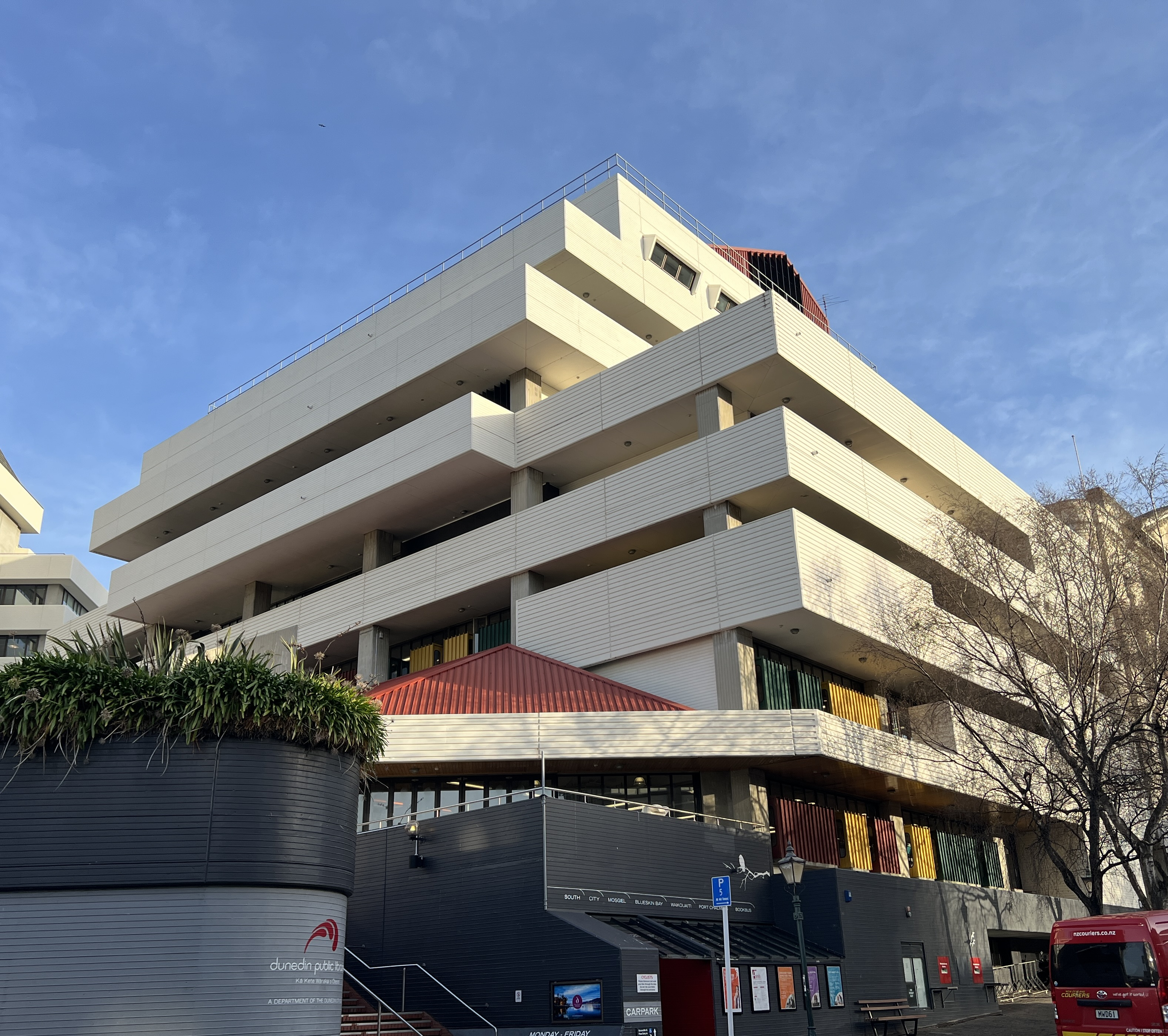
City Library looking southwest

Dunedin's first free public library opened on 2 December 1908, funded by a £10,000 grant from American philanthropist Andrew Carnegie. Situated at 110 Moray Place, the library originally offered a reference service only, but a children's reading room and lending library were opened in 1910, followed by lending services for adults in 1911. Services were expanded through the 1930s; in the 1950s, the book bus service was launched and the library's audio visual collection was established.

The library received its first major donation in 1913 when Dr Robert McNab presented some 4,200 volumes of New Zealand history and early voyages. Later donations would include the Walt Whitman Collection (from Mrs J. W. Stewart in 1927) and the Alfred and Isabel Reed Collection, which included medieval manuscripts, incunabula, Bibles, early printing and later manuscripts, works by Dickens and Johnson, and a vast quantity of manuscript letters. (Before the donation of his entire collection, Reed had been anonymously displaying some of his autograph letters in the library's entrance hall since at least 1926; he also openly donated a number of letters, magazines, and novels starting from 1926.) The vast size of the Reed Collection, in addition to the library's continual expansion, necessitated the library's removal to a new location.

Plans for the new library site were sketched in 1973, with construction commencing in 1978. The new building, at 230 Moray Pl, opened in 1981 and remains open to this day. Although the city library was originally independent from other nearby libraries, the 1989 merger of local councils and borough councils led to the creation of the Dunedin Public Libraries network, which incorporated the libraries in Mosgiel, Port Chalmers, Waikouaiti, Blueskin Bay, and Dunedin city into one entity.

=== Mosgiel Library ===
The first functioning library in Mosgiel was established in 1881 by the Athanaeum Committee. A new library administered by the Mosgiel Borough Council was opened in 1959, relocating twice before arriving at its present site on Hartstonge Ave. In 1989 the library joined the Dunedin Public Libraries network as a result of local council amalgamation. In addition to usual library resources, the Mosgiel Library operates the Mosgiel branch of the Dunedin City Council Customer Services Centre.

=== Port Chalmers Library ===
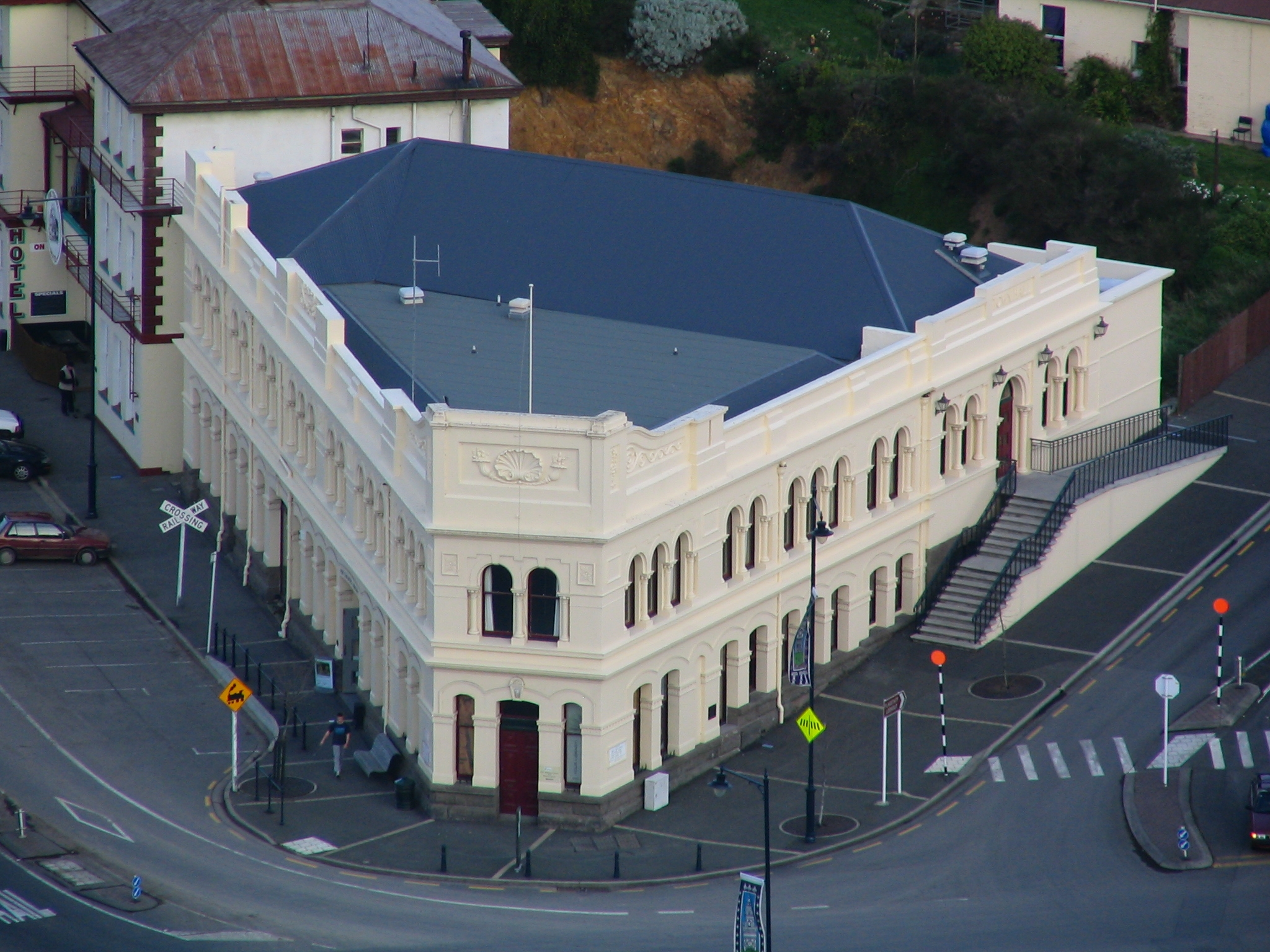
The Port Chalmers Municipal Building

Port Chalmers Mechanics Institute started in 1864, and became the Port Chalmers Public Library under the direct control of the borough council in 1943. The library was eventually housed in the Municipal Building. In 1989 the library joined the Dunedin Public Libraries network as a result of local council amalgamation.

In 2004 the Port Chalmers Library and Service Centre was completely refurbished by the Dunedin City Council. Extensive consultation with the Historic Places Trust meant the historic facade and many interesting internal features were retained. A number of art works have been added to the library collection, including some by Ralph Hotere, David Elliot, Robyn Belton, and Pamela Brown.

=== Waikouaiti Library ===
The Waikouaiti Library was founded in 1862 by the Rev A Fenton and Miss Emily Orbell and began with 100 books, half of them given by Mr Fenton. They were housed in the school room in Beach Street. Fenton's successor the Rev A Dasent took charge in 1863 and was chairman of the library committee for 11 years. The Library moved to Mechanics' Hall in 1875 and from that time a committee of seven was elected annually by the subscribers and the subscription was lowered from one pound to ten shillings.

In 1905 a new book room measuring 24 feet by 9 feet was built as a connection between the librarian's cottage and the hall on the north side. By 1913 there were 107 subscribers and over 3000 books. In the late 1960s the county council took over responsibility for the Hall and the Library. The committee continued to meet until 1974 as a county council committee, and then the library was quite on its own. It was visibly separated from the Hall also, because in that year the books were moved across the street to the RSA Community Centre, while the former library buildings were replaced by a chemist's shop, doctors rooms, and meeting rooms.

From around 2000 issues a year in 1970 numbers were up to 22,000 by May 1988. Unfortunately the building soon began to need frequent maintenance and it was obvious it was not a suitable place for a library which was expanding dramatically now that Waikouaiti was part of Dunedin City. With amalgamation the library became part of the Dunedin Public Libraries network in 1989. The Community Centre was demolished and a new Waikouaiti Library was built in the last weeks of 1995.

=== Blueskin Bay Library ===
Blueskin Bay Library opened in the school house in 1871. It moved to a separate building in 1903 and to the public hall in 1972. Both Waitati and Waikouaiti Libraries were administered by Silverpeaks County prior to local government amalgamation in 1989. Blueskin Bay Library was constructed in 1992 as an extension to the Waitati Hall. A new library complex was opened in May 2013.

=== South Dunedin Community Library ===
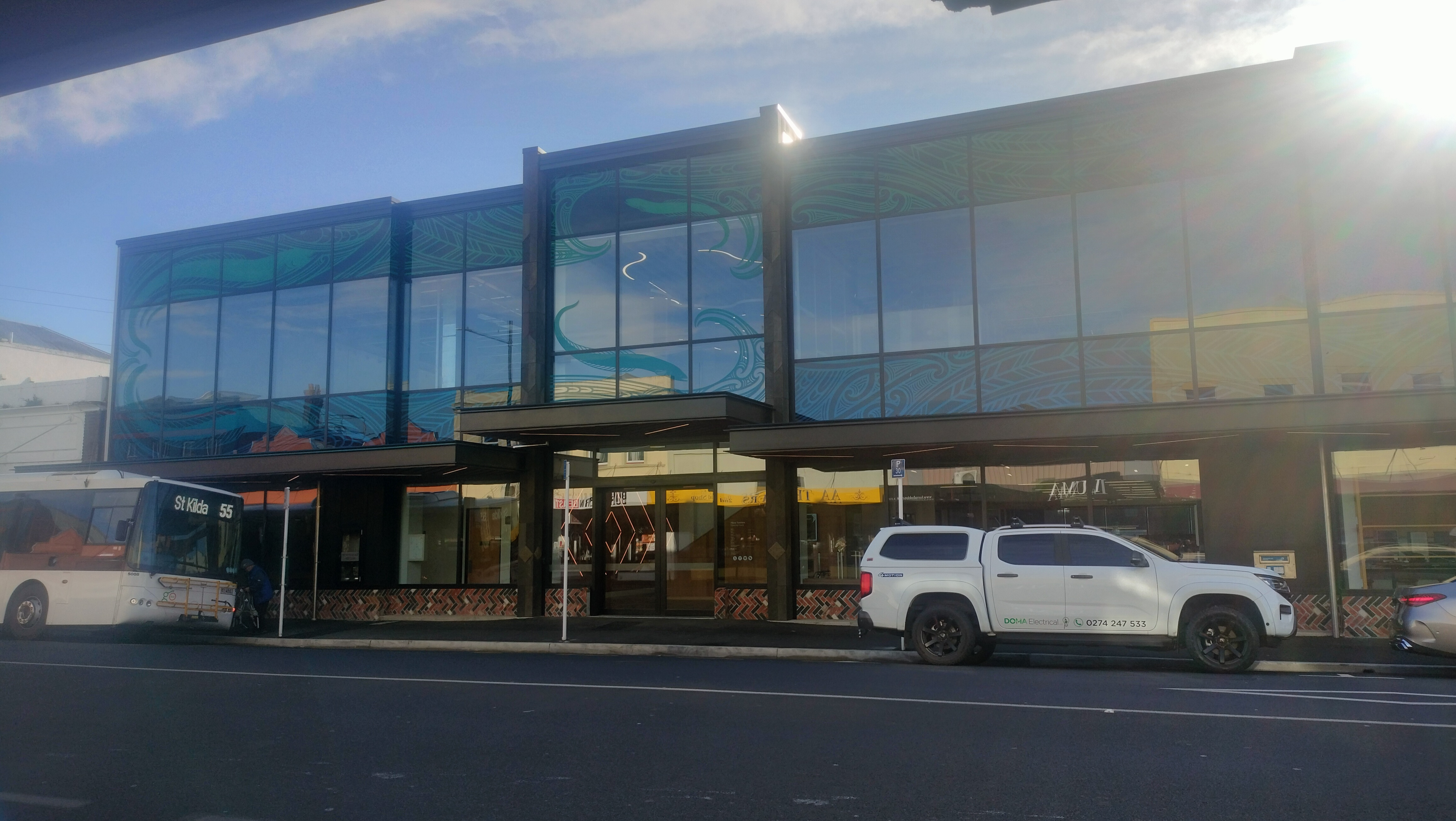
The South Dunedin Community Library on King Edward Street

The South Dunedin Community Library formally opened on 4 October 2025. It is located at the Te Whata o Kaituna building complex on King Edward Street in South Dunedin. The NZ$22 million facility was developed by the Dunedin City Council in collaboration with Positive Property Ltd, Aukaha, Baker Garden Architects and Naylor Love. The building incorporates Māori, Samoan, Rarotongan and Tahitian-inspired internal and exterior art. The South Dunedin library also has a municipal service centre, recording studio, maker space and meeting rooms.

This library replaced a temporary facility known as the South Dunedin Community Pop-Up, which opened in Hillside Road in 2017.

=== Bookbuses ===
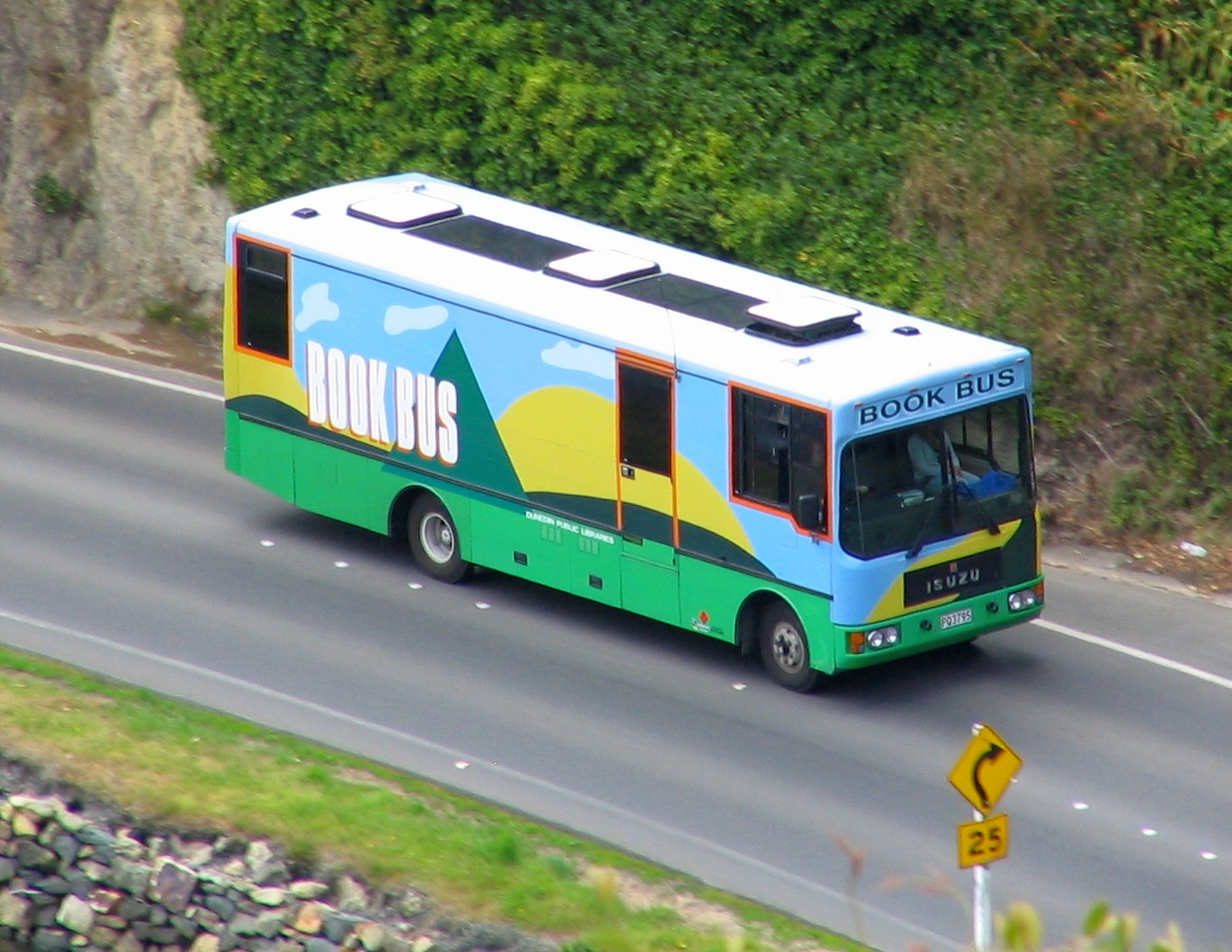
The PQ bookbus on Portobello Road in 2010

The Library Committee bought a passenger bus in 1949 and equipped it for use as a travelling library. The first distribution of books was made on 17 April 1950. In 1991 two new Isuzu F-Series trucks were commissioned as bookbuses. They are painted with colourful scenes, one featuring penguins and the countryside, the other a cityscape. The two bookbuses currently visit customers in 51 locations throughout the city offering fiction, non-fiction and reference books for children and adults, large print, talking books, audio-visual material (on request) and magazines. The buses are connected to online services.

== Special collections ==
The Dunedin Public Libraries network holds a number of special collections, including two heritage collections. The heritage collections are open to the public, but items can only be used on the third floor of the City Library.

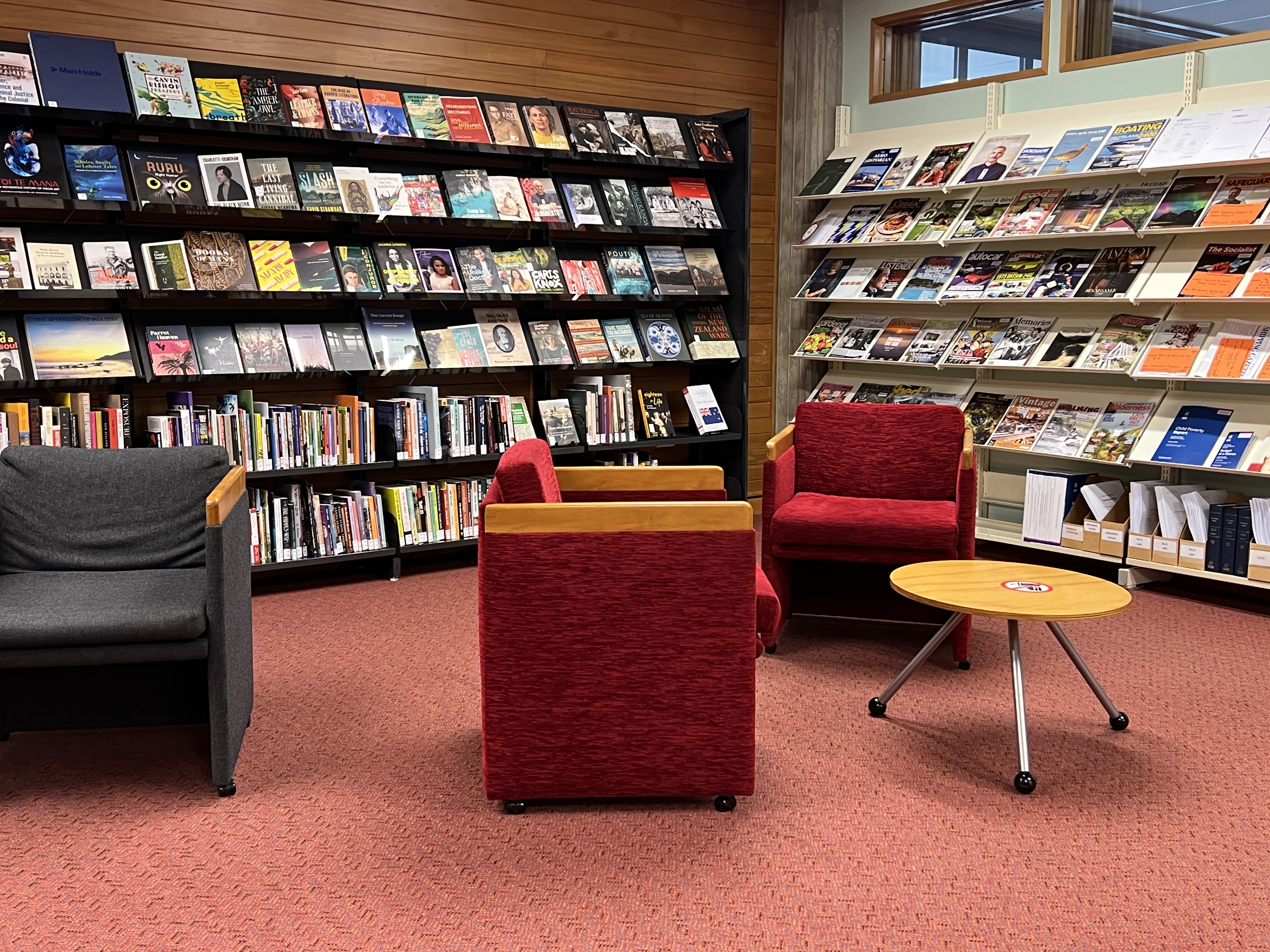
McNab New Zealand Collection

The McNab New Zealand Collection contains over 100,000 items concerning the history of the New Zealand and Pacific regions. This collection began with the donation of Robert McNab's personal library in 1913 and includes considerable newspaper and genealogical resources.

The Alfred and Isabel Reed Collection was donated in 1948; donor Alfred Reed would continue to add to the collection until his death in 1975. This collection contains around 10,000 items dating from the tenth century to the present, covering literature, religion, and the history of the book, and includes nearly 1,300 bibles. The Reed Collection's illuminated medieval manuscripts are considered one of the most outstanding assemblies of European visual art from the Middle Ages in Australasia. Reed had a personal fancy for autograph letters, many of which were bought in miscellaneous lots from London-based booksellers including Edward Friehold. The collection now boasts 5,200 autograph letters dating predominantly to the eighteenth and nineteenth centuries by literary, aristocratic, political and religious figures, and has been the subject of international scholarly attention. Of particular note, 41 previously unpublished letters in the Reed Collection form the core of In Her Hand, a 2013 collection that includes transcriptions, annotations, and discussions of letters by noted Romantic-era writers including Anna Barbauld, Felicia Hemans, Hannah More, Amelia Opie, and Maria Jane Jewsbury.
