= Te Rewa Rewa Bridge =

Bridge across the Waiwhakaiho River in New Plymouth, New Zealand

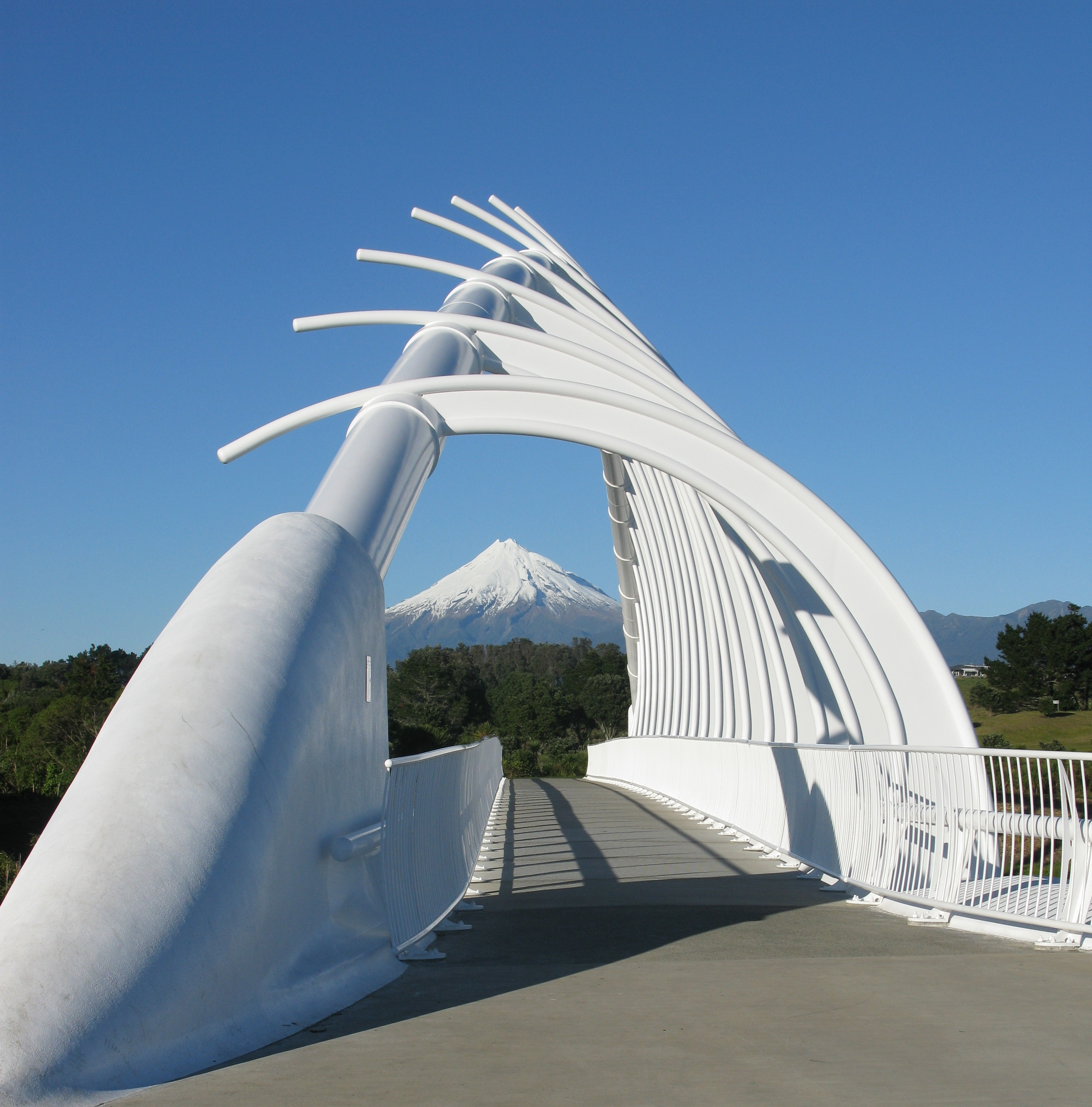
- Te Rewa Rewa Bridge with Mount Taranaki in the background
- Coordinates: 39.03777°S 174.11229°E
- Carries: pedestrians, cyclists
- Crosses: Waiwhakaiho River
- Locale: New Plymouth, Taranaki, New Zealand
- Official name: Te Rewa Rewa Bridge

Characteristics
- Design: steel arch
- Material: Steel, concrete deck
- Total length: 70 m
- Width: 2.5 m
- Height: 10 m at highest point
- Longest span: 68.8 m
- No. of spans: 1
- Piers in water: nil
- Clearance below: 4.5 m

History
- Designer: Novare Design Ltd
- Constructed by: Whitaker Civil Engineering
- Construction start: 2008
- Construction end: 2010
- Opened: 5 June 2010

Location
- Interactive map of Te Rewa Rewa Bridge

Te Rewa Rewa Bridge is a pedestrian and cycleway bridge across the Waiwhakaiho River at New Plymouth in New Zealand. Its spectacular shape and setting make it a popular landmark.

== Location and history ==
The bridge is part of the northern extension to the Coastal Walkway, connecting New Plymouth with Bell Block. The extension was made possible by a special agreement between Ngāti Tawhirikura hapū and the New Plymouth District Council. A historic pā is located on the north river bank and this was the site of a battle during the Musket Wars; the site is a burial ground (Rewa Rewa). The bridge is located in a semi-rural area.

== Design and construction ==
The bridge was commissioned by New Plymouth District Council and designed and constructed by a consortium of Whitaker Civil Engineering, Novare Design Ltd, Apex Consultants Ltd (now Spiire) and Fitzroy Engineering (now DIALOG Fitzroy). The bridge was funded by New Plymouth District Council and the Whitaker family.

=== Bridge design ===
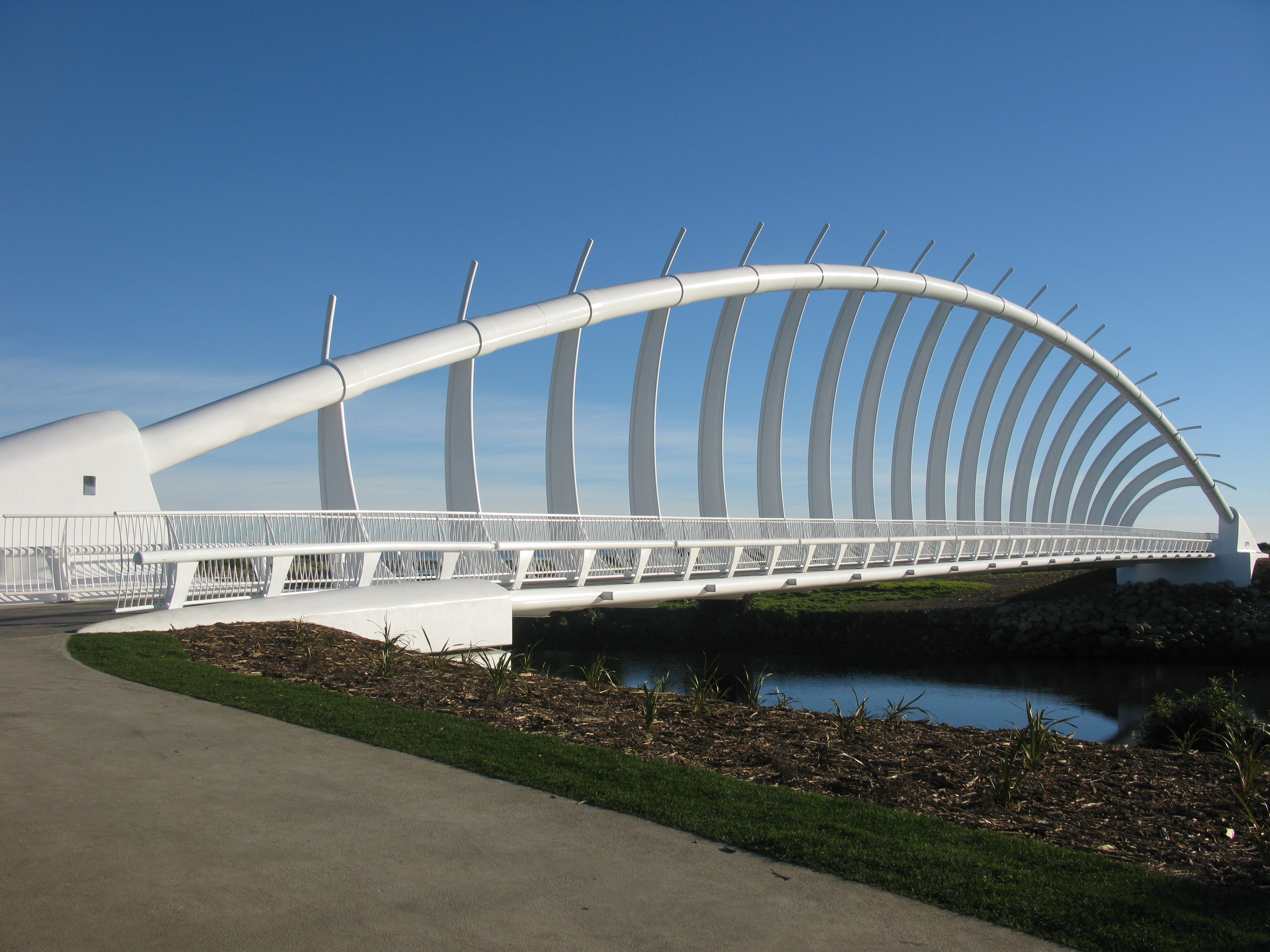
The bridge is designed to evoke a sense of wind as a metaphor for the enduring spirit of the dead buried around the Rewa Rewa Pa site

The designer, Peter Mulqueen, is quoted as saying he understood that the bridge should "touch lightly" on the Rewa Rewa side of the river, in order to honour the deceased. This ruled out heavier designs like cable stays and angular truss structures. Mulqueen wanted to achieve a bridge with a "harmonious and dignified character".

With the ribs yielding to the prevailing wind, the bridge is aligned to Mount Taranaki. The sacred mountain is framed within the skewed arch, when viewed while leaving the sacred ground – promising what is eternal.

=== Engineering design ===
The 68.8 metres (226 ft) bridge is designed to accommodate an ambulance and other service vehicles. It is made of three steel tubes; two beneath the deck and the remaining one, together with 19 ribs, forming a distinctive arch. 85 t of fabrication steel, 62 t of reinforcing steel and 550 m^{3} (19,000 cu ft) of concrete have been used for its construction. The bridge deck has been placed at 4.5 metres (15 ft) above normal flow level to withstand both floods and lahars from volcanic eruptions.

A major challenge was to transport the 85 metres (279 ft) long and 85 t superstructure onto the site, including across a private golf course. River contamination and disturbance was to be avoided, so no temporary piers were used.

== Opening ==
The bridge was officially opened on 5 June 2010. In July 2010, its first full month of operation, the bridge was used by 55,756 cyclists and pedestrians.

== Awards ==
- 2011 Arthur G. Hayden Medal for a single recent outstanding achievement in bridge engineering demonstrating innovation in special use bridges.
- 2011 Ingenium Excellence Awards.
- 2011 International Footbridge Award in the aesthetics category (medium span).
- 2011 Supreme Award from industry group Roading New Zealand.
- 2011 Taranaki Master Builders supreme award for a commercial facility.
