= List of marae in Taranaki =

This is a list of marae (Māori meeting grounds) in the Taranaki region of New Zealand.

In October 2020, the Government committed $7,407,008 from the Provincial Growth Fund to upgrade 23 marae in the region, with the intention of creating 305.5 jobs.

== New Plymouth District ==
Marae name	Wharenui name	Iwi and hapū	Location
Kairau	Te Hungaririki	Te Āti Awa (Pukerangiora)	Waitara
Katere Ki-Te-Moana Marae	Katere Ki-Te-Moana	Te Āti Awa (Ngāti Tāwhirikura)	Waiwhakaiho
Te Kohanga Moa	Matamua	Te Āti Awa (Pukerangiora)	Inglewood
Mangaemiemi / Otaraua	Te Ahi Kaa Roa	Te Āti Awa (Otaraua)	Tikorangi
Muru Raupatu	Muru Raupatu	Te Āti Awa (Puketapu)	Bell Block
Ōākura / Okorotua	Moana Kaurai	Taranaki (Ngāti Tairi)	Ōakura
Ōwae / Manukorihi	Te Ikaroa a Māui	Te Āti Awa (Manukorihi, Ngāti Rāhiri, Ngāti Te Whiti)	Waitara
Pukearuhe	Tama Ariki	Ngāti Tama	Mimi
Te Upoko o te Whenua	Ngārongo	Ngāti Maru	Ratapiko
Urenui Marae	Te Aroha, Mahi Tamariki	Ngāti Mutunga	Urenui

== Stratford District ==
Marae name	Wharenui name	Iwi and hapū	Location
Whakaahurangi Marae	Te Whetū o Marama	Ngāti Ruanui (Ahitahi)	Stratford

== South Taranaki District ==
Marae name	Wharenui name	Iwi and hapū	Location
Aotearoa Marae	Ngākaunui	Ngāruahine (Ōkahu-Inuāwai)	Matapu
Ararātā	No wharenui	Ngāti Ruanui (Ngāti Hawe)	Rawhitiroa
Te Aroha o Tītokowaru	Te Aroha	Ngāruahine (Ngāti Manuhiakai)	Matapu
Te Ihupuku / Parehungahunga	Te Kawerau	Ngā Rauru Kītahi (Ngāti Hinewaiata)	Waitōtara
Kaipō / Wharetapapa	Tokanuhea III	Ngā Rauru Kītahi (Ngāti Hou Tipua)	Waitōtara
Kanihi / Māwhitiwhiti	Kanihi	Ngāruahine (Kanihi-Umutahi)	Matapu
Ketemarae Pā/ Ngārongo	Kumea Mai te Waka, Te Manawanui	Ngāti Ruanui (Araukūku)	Normanby
Manutahi Marae / Te Takere	Taumaha	Ngāti Ruanui (Ngāti Tākou)	Manutahi
Meremere Marae	Tataurangi	Ngāti Ruanui (Ngā Ariki, Ngāti Hine, Tūwhakaehu)	Ohangai
Mokoia Marae	Mokoia	Ngāti Ruanui (Ngā Ariki)	Mokoia
Ngātiki Pā	Maramaranui	Tangahoe (Hāmua, Ngāti Hawe, Hapotiki, Tupaea, Tanewai)	Hāwera
Ōeo	Tipua Horonuku, Tipua Hororangi	Ngāruahine (Ngāti Tamaahuroa me Tītahi)	Ōpunake
Ōrimupiko	Ōhinetuhirau	Taranaki (Ngāti Haumia, Ngāti Tamarongo, Ngāti Kahumate)	Ōpunake
Okare ki Uta	No wharenui	Ngāruahine (Ngāti Haua)	Manaia
Parāhuka Marae	Parāhuka	Taranaki (Te Niho o Te Atiawa)	Pungarehu
Parihaka Marae	Rangikapuia, Te Niho, Toroanui, Mahikuare	Taranaki (Ngāti Haupoto, Ngāti Moeahu)	Parihaka
Pariroa	Taiporohēnui	Ngāti Ruanui (Ngāti Hine, Ngāti Kōtuku, Ngāti Ringi, Ngāti Tūpito, Tuatahi)	Kakaramea
Te Rangatapu	Aorangi	Ngāruahine (Kanihi-Umutahi, Ōkahu-Inuāwai)	Hāwera
Te Pōtaka Marae	Te Pōtaka	Taranaki (Ngāti Haupoto, Ngāti Tara, Ngāti Tuhekerangi)	Oaonui
Pūniho / Tarawainuku	Kaimirumiru, Ko Pauna te Tipuna	Taranaki (Ngā Māhanga)	Warea
Taiporohēnui	Whareroa	Ngāti Ruanui (Hāmua, Hāpōtiki)	Hāwera
Takirau	Ko Te Marunga Nui o Pourua	Ngā Rauru Kītahi (Ngāti Pourua)	Waitōtara
Takitūtū Marae	Te Paepae o Te Raukura	Taranaki	Pungarehu
Tauranga Ika	Te Aputa ki Wairau	Ngā Rauru Kītahi (Ngāti Ruaiti)	Waitōtara
Tawhitinui Marae	Okare Tuatoru	Ngāruahine (Ngāti Haua)	Manaia
Waiokura	Paraukau Tukau	Ngāruahine (Ngāti Tū)	Manaia
Wai o Turi	Rangiharuru	Ngāti Ruanui (Rangitāwhi)	Pātea
Waipapa / Moumahaki	Ngā Paiaka	Ngā Rauru Kītahi (Ngā Ariki)	Waitōtara
Te Wairoa-iti	Maruata	Ngā Rauru Kītahi (Ngāti Tai)	Waverley
Wharepuni	Tūpaia	Ngāti Ruanui (Ngāti Tānewai, Ngāti Tūpaea)	Hāwera
Whenuakura Pā	Matangirei	Ngāti Ruanui (Hine Waiata, Ngāti Hine)	Whenuakura

== See also ==
- Lists of marae in New Zealand
- List of marae in Manawatū-Whanganui
- List of schools in Taranaki
