= List of schools in Taranaki =

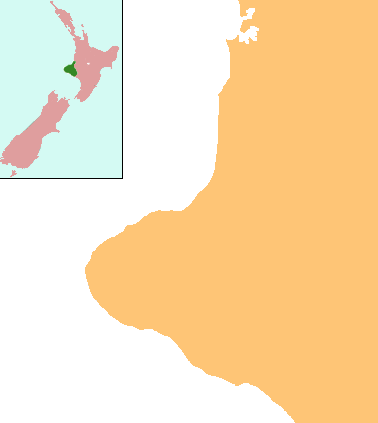
Localities offering secondary education in Taranaki

Taranaki is a region in the North Island of New Zealand. It contains numerous rural primary schools, some small town primary and secondary schools, and city schools in the New Plymouth area. Area schools in isolated areas provide complete education from primary to secondary level. Intermediate schools exist in New Plymouth, Waitara, and Hāwera.

All schools are coeducational except for the boys' schools of Francis Douglas Memorial College and New Plymouth Boys' High School and the girls' schools of New Plymouth Girls' High School, Sacred Heart Girls' College, and Taranaki Diocesan School for Girls.

There are two Kura Kaupapa Māori schools in the South Taranaki District, and one in New Plymouth. These schools teach solely or principally in the Māori language. The name "Te Kura Kaupapa Maori o (placename)" can be translated as "The Kaupapa Maori School of (placename)".

In New Zealand schools, students begin formal education in Year 1 at the age of five. Year 13 is the final year of secondary education. Years 14 and 15 refer to adult education facilities.

State schools are those fully funded by the government and at which no fees can be charged to domestic student (i.e. New Zealand citizens and permanent residents, and Australian citizens), although a donation is commonly requested. A state integrated school is a state school with a special character based on a religious or philosophical belief. A private school charges fees to its students.

The Socio-Economic Decile is a widely used measure in education in New Zealand used to allocate funding and support. A rating of 1 indicates a poor area; a rating of 10 a well-off one. The decile ratings used here come from the Ministry of Education Te Kete Ipurangi website and from the decile change spreadsheet listed in the references. The deciles were last revised using information from the 2006 Census. The roll of each school changes frequently as students start school for the first time, move between schools, and graduate. The rolls given here are those provided by the Ministry of Education, based on figures from July 2026. The Ministry of Education institution number, given in the last column, links to the Education Counts page for each school.

== New Plymouth District ==
The New Plymouth District covers the northern area of Taranaki, including the city of New Plymouth and the towns of Ōkato, Waitara and Inglewood.

Name	Years	Area	Authority	Decile	Roll	Website	MOE
Ahititi School	1–8	Ahititi	State	5	14	—	2150
Bell Block School	1–8	Bell Block	State	5	446		2157
Central School	1–6	Welbourn	State	8	217	—	2160
Coastal Taranaki School	1–15	Ōkato	State	7	240	—	551
Devon Intermediate	7–8	Lynmouth	State	4	345		2161
Egmont Village School	1–8	Egmont Village	State	9	198	—	2164
Fitzroy School	1–6	Fitzroy	State	8	434	—	2167
Francis Douglas Memorial College	7–15	Westown	State integrated	8	791		175
Frankley School	1–6	Hurdon	State	10	243		2168
Highlands Intermediate	7–8	Brooklands	State	7	712		2172
Huirangi School	1–6	Huirangi	State	2	110	—	2175
Inglewood High School	9–15	Inglewood	State	7	537		177
Inglewood School	1–8	Inglewood	State	5	385	—	2177
Kaimata School	1–8	Kaimata	State	6	105	—	2178
Lepperton School	1–6	Lepperton	State	9	123		2182
Mangorei School	1–8	Mangorei	State	10	283		2189
Manukorihi Intermediate	7–8	Waitara	State	2	208	—	2190
Marfell School	1–6	Marfell	State	1	131	—	2192
Merrilands School	1–6	Merrilands	State	6	139		2197
Mimi School	1–6	Mimi	State	4	27		2199
Moturoa School	1–6	Moturoa	State	3	143	—	2203
New Plymouth Boys' High School	9–15	Welbourn	State	7	1,484		171
New Plymouth Girls' High School	9–15	Strandon	State	7	1,301		172
New Plymouth Seventh Day Adventist School	1–8	Vogeltown	State integrated	6	59	—	4123
Norfolk School	1–8	Norfolk	State	8	154		2206
Oakura School	1–8	Oakura	State	10	379		2208
Omata School	1–8	Omata	State	8	120	—	2214
Puketapu School	1–8	Bell Block	State	4	318		2223
Ratapiko School	1–8	Ratapiko	State	9	24	—	2227
Sacred Heart Girls' College	7–15	Strandon	State integrated	8	737		174
Spotswood College	9–15	Spotswood	State	5	936		173
Spotswood Primary School	1–6	Spotswood	State	4	203		2232
St John Bosco School	1–6	Fitzroy	State integrated	8	259		2233
St Joseph's School (New Plymouth)	1–6	Lynmouth	State integrated	7	281		2236
St Joseph's School (Waitara)	1–8	Waitara	State integrated	2	91	—	2239
St Patrick's School	1–8	Inglewood	State integrated	5	59	—	2241
St Pius X School	1–6	Brooklands	State integrated	8	188		2242
Te Piipiinga Kakano Mai Rangiatea	1–8	Spotswood	State	2	131	—	4145
Tikorangi School	1–6	Tikorangi	State	4	164	—	2251
Urenui School	1–6	Urenui	State	5	96	—	2256
Uruti School	1–8	Uruti	State	3	9	—	2257
Vogeltown School	1–6	Vogeltown	State	8	329		2258
Waitara Central School	1–6	Waitara	State	2	175	—	2260
Waitara East School	1–6	Waitara	State	2	196	—	2261
Waitara High School	9–15	Waitara	State	2	440		170
Waitoriki School	1–8	Waitoriki	State	4	32		2262
Welbourn School	1–6	Welbourn	State	8	341		2264
West End School	1–6	Lynmouth	State	6	223	—	2265
Westown School	1–6	Westown	State	3	171		2266
Woodleigh School	1–6	Frankleigh Park	State	7	429		2268

== Stratford District ==
Stratford District covers the area to the east of Mount Taranaki. Part of the district is in the Manawatū-Whanganui Region. The only substantial town is Stratford.

Name	Years	Area	Authority	Decile	Roll	Website	MOE
Avon School	1–8	Stratford	State	1	56	—	2153
Huiakama School	1–8	Huiakama	State	6	11	—	2173
Makahu School	1–8	Makahu	State	6	18	—	2185
Marco School	1–8	Marco	State	8	17	—	2191
Midhirst School	1–8	Midhirst	State	6	134		2198
Ngaere School	1–8	Ngaere	State	8	154		2205
Pembroke School	1–8	Pembroke	State	6	81		2220
St Joseph's School	1–8	Stratford	State integrated	6	153	—	2238
Stratford High School	9–15	Stratford	State	4	701		179
Stratford High School Teen Parent Unit	–	Stratford	State	1	n/a		2754
Stratford Primary School	1–8	Stratford	State	4	430		2244
Taranaki Diocesan School for Girls	9–15	Stratford	State integrated	6	101		180
Toko School	1–8	Toko	State	8	105		2254

== South Taranaki District ==
The South Taranaki District covers the area to the south of Mount Taranaki. The principal towns are Hāwera, Ōpunake, and Pātea.

Name	Years	Area	Authority	Decile	Roll	Website	MOE
Auroa School	1–8	Auroa	State	8	162	—	2152
Eltham School	1–8	Eltham	State	3	136		2165
Hawera Christian School	1–8	Hāwera	State integrated	6	50		1184
Hawera Primary School	1–6	Hāwera	State	4	162		2171
Kakaramea School	1–6	Kakaramea	State	5	62	—	2374
Kaponga School	1–8	Kaponga	State	4	47	—	2095
Manaia School	1–8	Manaia	State	4	54		2097
Matapu School	1–8	Matapu	State	7	148		2098
Mokoia School	1–6	Mokoia	State	7	22		2201
Ngamatapouri School	1–8	Ngamatapouri	State	9	3		2407
Normanby School	1–6	Normanby	State	4	139		2207
Opunake High School	9–15	Ōpunake	State	4	318		181
Opunake School	1–8	Ōpunake	State	4	153		2216
Pātea Area School	1–15	Pātea	State	1	179	—	185
Rahotu School	1–8	Rahotu	State	6	124		1679
Ramanui School	1–6	Hāwera	State	2	62	—	2226
Rawhitiroa School	1–8	Rawhitiroa	State	6	43		2228
St Joseph's School (Hāwera)	1–8	Hāwera	State integrated	6	204	—	2235
St Joseph's School (Ōpunake)	1–8	Ōpunake	State integrated	6	123		2237
St Joseph's School (Pātea)	1–6	Pātea	State integrated	1	5		2452
St Patrick's School	1–8	Kaponga	State integrated	5	28		2240
Tawhiti School	1–6	Hāwera	State	4	278		2248
Te Kura o Nga Ruahine Rangi	1–15	Mangatoki	State	3	64	—	589
Te Kura Kaupapa Maori o Ngati Ruanui	1–8	Hāwera	State	1	139	—	2383
Te Kura Kaupapa Maori o Tamarongo	1–8	Opunake	State	4	25	—	4223
Te Paepae o Aotea	7–13	Hāwera	State	—	867		961
Turuturu School	1–6	Hāwera	State	6	273	—	2255
Waitotara School	1–8	Waitotara	State	2	41		2474
Waverley Primary School	1–6	Waverley	State	3	157	—	2478
Whenuakura School	1–6	Whenuakura	State	4	30	—	2483

== Closed schools ==
Hawera High School and Hawera Intermediate closed and were replaced by Te Paepae o Aotea at the beginning of 2023.

Hurleyville School closed in 2016.
