= Rahotu =

Settlement in Taranaki Region, New Zealand

- Rural settlement
- Etymology: rā: sun; hotu: to long for
- Interactive map of Rahotu
- Coordinates: 39°19′39″S 173°48′15″E
- Country: New Zealand
- Region: Taranaki
- Territorial authority: South Taranaki District
- Wards: Taranaki Coastal General Ward; Te Kūrae Māori Ward
- Community: Taranaki Coastal Community
- Iwi: Taranaki
- Settled: c. 1886
- Electorates: New Plymouth; Te Tai Hauāuru (Māori)

Government
  - Territorial Authority: South Taranaki District Council
  - Regional council: Taranaki Regional Council
  - Mayor of South Taranaki: Phil Nixon
  - New Plymouth MP: David MacLeod
  - Te Tai Hauāuru MP: Debbie Ngarewa-Packer

Area
  - Total: 75.15 km^{2} (29.02 sq mi)

Population (2018)
  - Total: 483
  - Density: 6.43/km^{2} (16.6/sq mi)
- Postcodes: 4684, 4685
- Area code: 06

Rahotu (Māori: [ɾaːˈhɔtʉ]) is a rural settlement in the North Island of New Zealand, located within the Taranaki region and governed by the South Taranaki District Council. Positioned along State Highway 45, it lies between Ōpunake to the south and New Plymouth to the north. According to the New Zealand Ministry for Culture and Heritage, the Māori meaning of Rahotu is "long for the sun".

== History ==
The first recorded interaction between Māori and Europeans in the area occurred on 29 April 1834, when the ship Harriet was wrecked off the coast. Among those on board was Captain Guard, a whaler traveling from Sydney to his whaling station at Port Underwood, along with his wife and two young children. All passengers safely reached shore and set up camp near the mouth of the Okahu River. Initially, their encounter with local Māori appeared friendly, but tensions soon escalated into conflict. Captain Guard and some of his companions managed to escape, while his wife and children were captured and held as prisoners before eventually being released unharmed.

Before 1880, the land between Ōpunake and Ōkato was closed to overseas visitors, as it was controlled by Chief Tohu Kākahi and Prophet Te Whiti o Rongomai. However, the government later decided to open the area for settlement. In May 1880, six hundred armed constabulary advanced from both ends of the territory, constructing and surveying what is now State Highway 45. The two contingents met near present-day Pungarehu and took possession of Rahotu in 1881 by seizing both Māori pā on either side of the newly established road. The northern pā, situated at the southwest corner of the domain, gave Rahotu its name. Once occupied, the domain was established as a site for sports activities.

The confiscated land near present-day Rahotu was retained by the government and used as a military base to house armed constabulary during and after the 1881 invasion of Parihaka. With Parihaka reduced to a smaller village and its leaders imprisoned, the government no longer needed the base and sought funding through land sales. The property boundaries extended along and down two tracks now known as Coast Road and Tipoka Road. On 18 October 1883, William Ralston Wright purchased the land. As late as 1886, cottages were still being built in the area, which had previously served as a tent encampment leading to Parihaka. It was officially recognised as a new district around this time.

== Demographics ==
Rahotu locality covers 75.15 km^{2} (29.02 sq mi). The locality is part of the larger Parihaka statistical area.

Historical population for Rahotu locality
Year	Pop.	±% p.a.
2006	474	—
2013	489	+0.45%
2018	453	−1.52%
2023	483	+1.29%

Rahotu had a population of 483 in the 2023 New Zealand census, an increase of 30 people (6.6%) since the 2018 census, and a decrease of 6 people (−1.2%) since the 2013 census. There were 264 males, 222 females, and 3 people of other genders in 186 dwellings. 2.5% of people identified as LGBTIQ+. There were 99 people (20.5%) aged under 15 years, 102 (21.1%) aged 15 to 29, 222 (46.0%) aged 30 to 64, and 63 (13.0%) aged 65 or older.

People could identify as more than one ethnicity. The results were 76.4% European (Pākehā), 36.0% Māori, 2.5% Pasifika, 6.8% Asian, and 3.7% other, which includes people giving their ethnicity as "New Zealander". English was spoken by 98.8%, Māori by 4.3%, and other languages by 3.7%. No language could be spoken by 1.9% (e.g. too young to talk). New Zealand Sign Language was known by 0.6%. The percentage of people born overseas was 9.9, compared with 28.8% nationally.

Religious affiliations were 28.0% Christian, 1.9% Māori religious beliefs, 0.6% Jewish, and 1.2% other religions. People who answered that they had no religion were 55.9%, and 12.4% of people did not answer the census question.

Of those at least 15 years old, 27 (7.0%) people had a bachelor's or higher degree, 216 (56.2%) had a post-high school certificate or diploma, and 135 (35.2%) people exclusively held high school qualifications. 21 people (5.5%) earned over $100,000 compared to 12.1% nationally. The employment status of those at least 15 was 189 (49.2%) full-time, 63 (16.4%) part-time, and 15 (3.9%) unemployed.

=== Parihaka statistical area ===
Parihaka statistical area, which was called Cape Egmont statistical area before 2023, also includes Warea, Pungarehu, Parihaka, and Oaonui. It covers 434.16 km^{2} (167.63 sq mi) and had an estimated population of 2,340 as of June 2025, with a population density of 5.4 people per km^{2}.

Historical population for Parihaka/Cape Egmont
Year	Pop.	±% p.a.
2006	2,100	—
2013	2,106	+0.04%
2018	2,067	−0.37%
2023	2,262	+1.82%

Parihaka had a population of 2,262 in the 2023 New Zealand census, an increase of 195 people (9.4%) since the 2018 census, and an increase of 156 people (7.4%) since the 2013 census. There were 1,179 males, 1,071 females, and 12 people of other genders in 828 dwellings. 2.1% of people identified as LGBTIQ+. The median age was 35.6 years (compared with 38.1 years nationally). There were 549 people (24.3%) aged under 15 years, 423 (18.7%) aged 15 to 29, 1,053 (46.6%) aged 30 to 64, and 240 (10.6%) aged 65 or older.

People could identify as more than one ethnicity. The results were 81.7% European (Pākehā); 30.2% Māori; 1.9% Pasifika; 3.4% Asian; 0.4% Middle Eastern, Latin American and African New Zealanders (MELAA); and 2.9% other, which includes people giving their ethnicity as "New Zealander". English was spoken by 97.5%, Māori by 6.9%, Samoan by 0.1%, and other languages by 3.6%. No language could be spoken by 2.1% (e.g. too young to talk). New Zealand Sign Language was known by 0.4%. The percentage of people born overseas was 8.8, compared with 28.8% nationally.

Religious affiliations were 27.9% Christian, 0.4% Hindu, 1.7% Māori religious beliefs, 0.1% Buddhist, 0.3% New Age, 0.1% Jewish, and 0.8% other religions. People who answered that they had no religion were 59.7%, and 9.0% of people did not answer the census question.

Of those at least 15 years old, 195 (11.4%) people had a bachelor's or higher degree, 1,005 (58.7%) had a post-high school certificate or diploma, and 513 (29.9%) people exclusively held high school qualifications. The median income was $39,200, compared with $41,500 nationally. 168 people (9.8%) earned over $100,000 compared to 12.1% nationally. The employment status of those at least 15 was 924 (53.9%) full-time, 273 (15.9%) part-time, and 42 (2.5%) unemployed.

== Education ==
Rahotu School is a co-educational primary school for students in Years 1 to 8, with an enrolment of 124 as of July 2026. Established in 1884, the school originally consisted of a single classroom during the town's early settlement period. In 1953, a new block of classrooms was constructed, and the original building was repurposed as the school hall.

== Notable people ==
- Percy Hickey (1899–1943), rugby union player
