= Oaonui =

- Interactive map of Oaonui
- Coordinates: 39°23′6″S 173°48′42″E
- Country: New Zealand
- Region: Taranaki
- District: South Taranaki District
- Wards: Taranaki Coastal General Ward; Te Kūrae Māori Ward
- Community: Taranaki Coastal Community
- Electorates: New Plymouth; Te Tai Hauāuru (Māori)

Government
  - Territorial Authority: South Taranaki District Council
  - Regional council: Taranaki Regional Council
  - Mayor of South Taranaki: Phil Nixon
  - New Plymouth MP: David MacLeod
  - Te Tai Hauāuru MP: Debbie Ngarewa-Packer

Area
  - Total: 84.00 km^{2} (32.43 sq mi)

Population (2023)
  - Total: 462
  - Density: 5.50/km^{2} (14.2/sq mi)

Oaonui is a community in the west of Taranaki, in the North Island of New Zealand. It is located on State Highway 45, 8 kilometres (5.0 mi) north of Ōpunake.

The New Zealand Ministry for Culture and Heritage gives a translation of "place of many clouds" for Ōaonui.

== Demographics ==
Oaonui locality covers 84.00 km^{2} (32.43 sq mi). The locality is part of the larger Parihaka statistical area.

Historical population
Year	Pop.	±% p.a.
2006	486	—
2013	438	−1.47%
2018	447	+0.41%
2023	462	+0.66%

Oaonui had a population of 462 in the 2023 New Zealand census, an increase of 15 people (3.4%) since the 2018 census, and an increase of 24 people (5.5%) since the 2013 census. There were 246 males, 213 females, and 3 people of other genders in 174 dwellings. 1.9% of people identified as LGBTIQ+. There were 108 people (23.4%) aged under 15 years, 96 (20.8%) aged 15 to 29, 213 (46.1%) aged 30 to 64, and 45 (9.7%) aged 65 or older.

People could identify as more than one ethnicity. The results were 83.1% European (Pākehā), 31.2% Māori, 1.3% Pasifika, 3.9% Asian, and 1.3% other, which includes people giving their ethnicity as "New Zealander". English was spoken by 98.1%, Māori by 6.5%, and other languages by 1.9%. No language could be spoken by 1.9% (e.g. too young to talk). New Zealand Sign Language was known by 0.6%. The percentage of people born overseas was 7.1, compared with 28.8% nationally.

Religious affiliations were 29.2% Christian, 0.6% Hindu, 1.3% Māori religious beliefs, and 0.6% other religions. People who answered that they had no religion were 55.2%, and 12.3% of people did not answer the census question.

Of those at least 15 years old, 33 (9.3%) people had a bachelor's or higher degree, 198 (55.9%) had a post-high school certificate or diploma, and 114 (32.2%) people exclusively held high school qualifications. 42 people (11.9%) earned over $100,000 compared to 12.1% nationally. The employment status of those at least 15 was 189 (53.4%) full-time, 54 (15.3%) part-time, and 12 (3.4%) unemployed.

== Marae ==
Te Pōtaka Marae and Te Pōtaka meeting house are located in the Oaonui area. The marae is a meeting ground for the Taranaki hapū of Ngāti Haupoto, Ngāti Tara and Ngāti Tuhekerangi.

In October 2020, the Government committed $105,342 from the Provincial Growth Fund to upgrade the marae, creating 8 jobs.
