= Pungarehu =

- Interactive map of Pungarehu
- Coordinates: 39°16′42″S 173°48′26″E
- Country: New Zealand
- Region: Taranaki
- District: South Taranaki District
- Wards: Taranaki Coastal General Ward; Te Kūrae Māori Ward
- Community: Taranaki Coastal Community
- Electorates: New Plymouth; Te Tai Hauāuru (Māori)

Government
  - Territorial Authority: South Taranaki District Council
  - Regional council: Taranaki Regional Council
  - Mayor of South Taranaki: Phil Nixon
  - New Plymouth MP: David MacLeod
  - Te Tai Hauāuru MP: Debbie Ngarewa-Packer

Area
  - Total: 52.99 km^{2} (20.46 sq mi)

Population (2023)
  - Total: 396
  - Density: 7.47/km^{2} (19.4/sq mi)

Pungarehu is a small town located on Surf Highway 45 in Taranaki, New Zealand. Pungarehu is the home of the Cape Egmont Lighthouse, situated at Taranaki's westernmost point.

The town centre is located almost 5 km from the coast line.

== Demographics ==
Pungarehu locality covers 52.99 km^{2} (20.46 sq mi). The locality is part of the larger Parihaka statistical area.

Historical population
Year	Pop.	±% p.a.
2006	336	—
2013	345	+0.38%
2018	348	+0.17%
2023	396	+2.62%

Pungarehu had a population of 396 in the 2023 New Zealand census, an increase of 48 people (13.8%) since the 2018 census, and an increase of 51 people (14.8%) since the 2013 census. There were 192 males, 201 females, and 3 people of other genders in 144 dwellings. 1.5% of people identified as LGBTIQ+. There were 99 people (25.0%) aged under 15 years, 60 (15.2%) aged 15 to 29, 183 (46.2%) aged 30 to 64, and 57 (14.4%) aged 65 or older.

People could identify as more than one ethnicity. The results were 74.2% European (Pākehā); 36.4% Māori; 3.0% Pasifika; 3.0% Asian; 0.8% Middle Eastern, Latin American and African New Zealanders (MELAA); and 3.0% other, which includes people giving their ethnicity as "New Zealander". English was spoken by 97.0%, Māori by 12.9%, Samoan by 0.8%, and other languages by 4.5%. No language could be spoken by 2.3% (e.g. too young to talk). New Zealand Sign Language was known by 1.5%. The percentage of people born overseas was 7.6, compared with 28.8% nationally.

Religious affiliations were 27.3% Christian, 0.8% Hindu, and 2.3% Māori religious beliefs. People who answered that they had no religion were 58.3%, and 9.8% of people did not answer the census question.

Of those at least 15 years old, 36 (12.1%) people had a bachelor's or higher degree, 168 (56.6%) had a post-high school certificate or diploma, and 90 (30.3%) people exclusively held high school qualifications. 21 people (7.1%) earned over $100,000 compared to 12.1% nationally. The employment status of those at least 15 was 150 (50.5%) full-time, 45 (15.2%) part-time, and 3 (1.0%) unemployed.

== Marae ==
The Parihaka Pa is located in Pungarehu, hosting the regular Parihaka Peace Festival. The town also hosts some small stores for the local dairy farmers.

Parāhuka Marae is a meeting place of the Taranaki hapū of Te Niho o Te Atiawa. In October 2020, the Government committed $478,243 from the Provincial Growth Fund to upgrade the marae, creating 6 jobs.

Takitūtū Marae and Te Paepae o Te Raukura meeting place is a meeting place of the Taranaki Iwi. In October 2020, the Government committed $359,146 towards refurbishing the marae, creating 6 jobs.

== Pungarehu School ==
Pungarehu School was a primary school in Pungarehu. It held a consistent roll of around 50 students, and catered for years 1–8.

The school was forced to close in 2003, due to a review of the New Zealand school system by the Ministry of Education. The school buildings are still located on the corner of Cape Road and are yet to be used. Currently, the Pungarehu area is accessed by the bus routes of Coastal Taranaki School, Opunake Middle School and Rahotu Primary School.
