= Mangatoki =

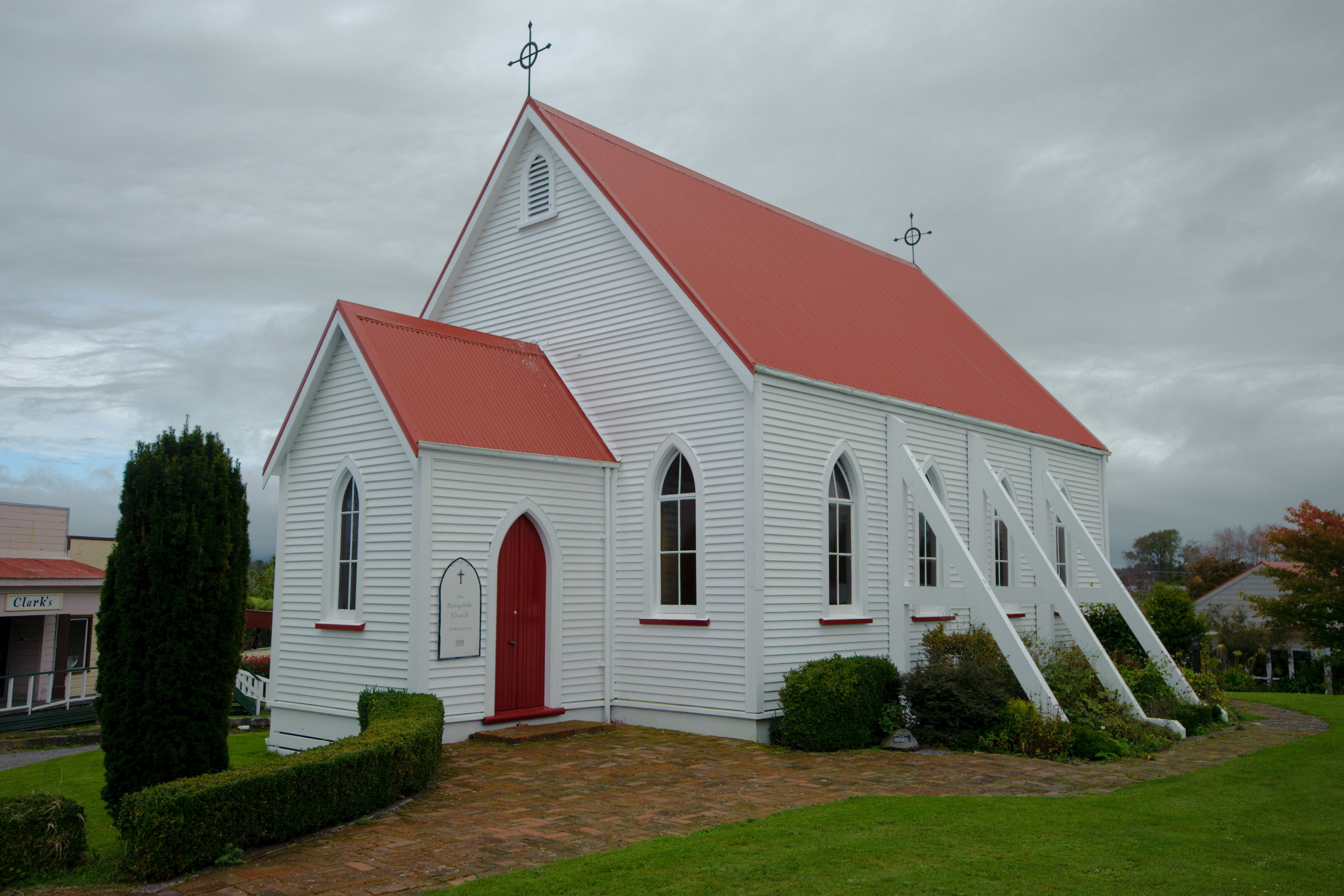
- The Mangatoki Church
- Interactive map of Mangatoki
- Coordinates: 39°25′29″S 174°13′6″E
- Country: New Zealand
- Region: Taranaki
- District: South Taranaki District
- Ward: Eltham-Kaponga
- Electorates: Whanganui; Te Tai Hauāuru (Māori)

Government
  - Territorial Authority: South Taranaki District Council
  - Regional council: Taranaki Regional Council
  - Mayor of South Taranaki: Phil Nixon
  - Whanganui MP: Carl Bates
  - Te Tai Hauāuru MP: Debbie Ngarewa-Packer

Area
  - Total: 43.33 km^{2} (16.73 sq mi)

Population (2023 Census)
  - Total: 252
  - Density: 5.82/km^{2} (15.1/sq mi)

Mangatoki is a locality in southern Taranaki, in New Zealand's North Island. Eltham is to the east, Kaponga to the west and Matapu to the south. The Mangatoki Stream runs from Mount Taranaki through the area and into the Waingongoro River.

== Demographics ==
Mangatoki locality covers 43.33 km^{2} (16.73 sq mi). It is part of the Kaponga-Mangatoki statistical area.

Historical population
Year	Pop.	±% p.a.
2006	297	—
2013	279	−0.89%
2018	279	+0.00%
2023	252	−2.02%

Mangatoki had a population of 252 in the 2023 New Zealand census, a decrease of 27 people (−9.7%) since the 2018 census, and a decrease of 27 people (−9.7%) since the 2013 census. There were 141 males and 114 females in 96 dwellings. 2.4% of people identified as LGBTIQ+. There were 66 people (26.2%) aged under 15 years, 36 (14.3%) aged 15 to 29, 123 (48.8%) aged 30 to 64, and 27 (10.7%) aged 65 or older.

People could identify as more than one ethnicity. The results were 94.0% European (Pākehā); 13.1% Māori; 1.2% Pasifika; 3.6% Asian; 1.2% Middle Eastern, Latin American and African New Zealanders (MELAA); and 2.4% other, which includes people giving their ethnicity as "New Zealander". English was spoken by 100.0%, Māori by 1.2%, and other languages by 3.6%. No language could be spoken by 2.4% (e.g. too young to talk). The percentage of people born overseas was 7.1, compared with 28.8% nationally.

The only religious affiliation given was 32.1% Christian. People who answered that they had no religion were 59.5%, and 8.3% of people did not answer the census question.

Of those at least 15 years old, 18 (9.7%) people had a bachelor's or higher degree, 114 (61.3%) had a post-high school certificate or diploma, and 57 (30.6%) people exclusively held high school qualifications. 18 people (9.7%) earned over $100,000 compared to 12.1% nationally. The employment status of those at least 15 was 111 (59.7%) full-time, 27 (14.5%) part-time, and 3 (1.6%) unemployed.

== Education ==
Te Kura o Nga Ruahine Rangi is a coeducational composite (years 1–15) school with a roll of 64 students as of July 2026. It started as a private school in Awatuna about 1996. At the beginning of 2008 it moved to the grounds of the former Mangatoki School and became a fully funded state school with "special character" status.

Mangatoki School was a primary school which opened in 1891 and closed in 2005.
