= Rawhitiroa =

Rural community in South Taranaki, New Zealand

- Interactive map of Rawhitiroa
- Coordinates: 39°25′26″S 174°21′57″E
- Country: New Zealand
- Region: Taranaki
- Territorial authority: South Taranaki District
- Ward: Eltham-Kaponga General Ward; Te Kūrae Māori Ward
- Community: Eltham-Kaponga Community
- Electorates: Whanganui; Te Tai Hauāuru (Māori)

Government
  - Territorial Authority: South Taranaki District Council
  - Regional council: Taranaki Regional Council
  - Mayor of South Taranaki: Phil Nixon
  - Whanganui MP: Carl Bates
  - Te Tai Hauāuru MP: Debbie Ngarewa-Packer

Area
  - Total: 35.26 km^{2} (13.61 sq mi)

Population (2023 Census)
  - Total: 321
  - Density: 9.10/km^{2} (23.6/sq mi)

Rawhitiroa is a locality situated in South Taranaki, New Zealand. It is positioned approximately 6.5 km east of Eltham.

According to the New Zealand Ministry for Culture and Heritage, Rāwhitiroa translates to "long-shining sun".

== Demographics ==
Rawhitiroa locality covers 35.26 km^{2} (13.61 sq mi). It is part of the larger Te Roti-Moeroa statistical area.

Historical population for Rawhitiroa locality
Year	Pop.	±% p.a.
2006	276	—
2013	288	+0.61%
2018	309	+1.42%
2023	321	+0.76%

Rawhitiroa had a population of 321 in the 2023 New Zealand census, an increase of 12 people (3.9%) since the 2018 census, and an increase of 33 people (11.5%) since the 2013 census. There were 153 males and 171 females in 120 dwellings. 3.7% of people identified as LGBTIQ+. There were 81 people (25.2%) aged under 15 years, 54 (16.8%) aged 15 to 29, 147 (45.8%) aged 30 to 64, and 42 (13.1%) aged 65 or older.

People could identify as more than one ethnicity. The results were 93.5% European (Pākehā), 10.3% Māori, 0.9% Pasifika, 0.9% Asian, and 3.7% other, which includes people giving their ethnicity as "New Zealander". English was spoken by 97.2%, Māori by 1.9%, and other languages by 1.9%. No language could be spoken by 2.8% (e.g. too young to talk). The percentage of people born overseas was 6.5, compared with 28.8% nationally.

Religious affiliations were 28.0% Christian, 1.9% New Age, and 1.9% other religions. People who answered that they had no religion were 57.0%, and 10.3% of people did not answer the census question.

Of those at least 15 years old, 21 (8.8%) people had a bachelor's or higher degree, 159 (66.2%) had a post-high school certificate or diploma, and 63 (26.2%) people exclusively held high school qualifications. 24 people (10.0%) earned over $100,000 compared to 12.1% nationally. The employment status of those at least 15 was 132 (55.0%) full-time, 39 (16.2%) part-time, and 3 (1.2%) unemployed.

=== Te Roti-Moeroa statistical area ===
Te Roti-Moeroa statistical area covers 361.93 km^{2} (139.74 sq mi) and had an estimated population of 880 as of June 2025, with a population density of 2.4 people per km^{2}.

Historical population for Te Roti-Moeroa
Year	Pop.	±% p.a.
2006	798	—
2013	789	−0.16%
2018	774	−0.38%
2023	858	+2.08%
The 2006 population is for a larger area of 361.94 km^{2}. Source:

Te Roti-Moeroa had a population of 858 in the 2023 New Zealand census, an increase of 84 people (10.9%) since the 2018 census, and an increase of 69 people (8.7%) since the 2013 census. There were 429 males and 429 females in 303 dwellings. 2.1% of people identified as LGBTIQ+. The median age was 37.6 years (compared with 38.1 years nationally). There were 204 people (23.8%) aged under 15 years, 135 (15.7%) aged 15 to 29, 402 (46.9%) aged 30 to 64, and 114 (13.3%) aged 65 or older.

People could identify as more than one ethnicity. The results were 89.2% European (Pākehā), 13.3% Māori, 0.3% Pasifika, 4.5% Asian, and 3.5% other, which includes people giving their ethnicity as "New Zealander". English was spoken by 97.2%, Māori by 2.1%, and other languages by 4.5%. No language could be spoken by 2.4% (e.g. too young to talk). New Zealand Sign Language was known by 0.3%. The percentage of people born overseas was 10.1, compared with 28.8% nationally.

Religious affiliations were 29.4% Christian, 0.3% Hindu, 0.7% Islam, 0.3% New Age, and 1.0% other religions. People who answered that they had no religion were 59.1%, and 8.7% of people did not answer the census question.

Of those at least 15 years old, 78 (11.9%) people had a bachelor's or higher degree, 387 (59.2%) had a post-high school certificate or diploma, and 186 (28.4%) people exclusively held high school qualifications. The median income was $43,100, compared with $41,500 nationally. 69 people (10.6%) earned over $100,000 compared to 12.1% nationally. The employment status of those at least 15 was 363 (55.5%) full-time, 90 (13.8%) part-time, and 9 (1.4%) unemployed.

== Marae ==
The local Ararātā Marae is a tribal meeting ground for the Ngāti Ruanui hapū of Ngāti Hawe.

== Education ==
Rawhitiroa School is a coeducational full primary (years 1-8) school with a roll of 46 students as of July 2025. The school opened on 11 December 1897, and was initially called Andersen Road School. The school was completely destroyed by fire twice, in 1944 and 1976, and rebuilt each time. Mangamingi School, which opened in 1903, was closed and merged with Rawhitiroa School at the end of 1988.
