= Ohangai =

Rural locality in Taranaki Region, New Zealand

- Interactive map of Ohangai
- Coordinates: 39°35′6″S 174°23′19″E
- Country: New Zealand
- Region: Taranaki
- Territorial authority: South Taranaki District
- Ward: Te Hāwera General Ward; Te Tai Tonga Māori Ward
- Community: Te Hāwera Community
- Electorates: Whanganui; Te Tai Hauāuru (Māori)

Government
  - Territorial Authority: South Taranaki District Council
  - Regional council: Taranaki Regional Council
  - Mayor of South Taranaki: Phil Nixon
  - Whanganui MP: Carl Bates
  - Te Tai Hauāuru MP: Debbie Ngarewa-Packer

Ohangai is a locality in South Taranaki, New Zealand. It is approximately 10 km east of Hāwera and 6 km north of Mokoia.

The New Zealand Ministry for Culture and Heritage gives a translation of "opposite place" for Ōhāngai.

== Demographics ==
Ohangai statistical area covers 331.78 km^{2} (128.10 sq mi) and had an estimated population of 650 as of June 2025, with a population density of 2.0 people per km^{2}.

Historical population
Year	Pop.	±% p.a.
2006	588	—
2013	570	−0.44%
2018	537	−1.19%
2023	612	+2.65%

The statistical area had a population of 612 in the 2023 New Zealand census, an increase of 75 people (14.0%) since the 2018 census, and an increase of 42 people (7.4%) since the 2013 census. There were 321 males, 285 females, and 6 people of other genders in 207 dwellings. 2.9% of people identified as LGBTIQ+. The median age was 35.2 years (compared with 38.1 years nationally). There were 156 people (25.5%) aged under 15 years, 93 (15.2%) aged 15 to 29, 303 (49.5%) aged 30 to 64, and 60 (9.8%) aged 65 or older.

People could identify as more than one ethnicity. The results were 84.3% European (Pākehā); 20.1% Māori; 2.0% Pasifika; 2.9% Asian; 1.5% Middle Eastern, Latin American and African New Zealanders (MELAA); and 2.9% other, which includes people giving their ethnicity as "New Zealander". English was spoken by 98.0%, Māori by 4.4%, and other languages by 4.4%. No language could be spoken by 2.0% (e.g. too young to talk). New Zealand Sign Language was known by 0.5%. The percentage of people born overseas was 11.3, compared with 28.8% nationally.

Religious affiliations were 28.4% Christian, 1.0% Māori religious beliefs, 1.0% Buddhist, 0.5% New Age, and 0.5% other religions. People who answered that they had no religion were 58.3%, and 9.8% of people did not answer the census question.

Of those at least 15 years old, 66 (14.5%) people had a bachelor's or higher degree, 279 (61.2%) had a post-high school certificate or diploma, and 114 (25.0%) people exclusively held high school qualifications. The median income was $45,700, compared with $41,500 nationally. 57 people (12.5%) earned over $100,000 compared to 12.1% nationally. The employment status of those at least 15 was 270 (59.2%) full-time, 72 (15.8%) part-time, and 12 (2.6%) unemployed.

== Marae ==
The local Meremere Marae and Tataurangi meeting house are affiliated with the Ngāti Ruanui hapū of Ngā Ariki, Ngāti Hine and Tūwhakaehu.

In October 2020, the Government committed $1,479,479 from the Provincial Growth Fund to renovate Meremere Marae, Ketemarae Pā, Pariroa Marae and Taiporohēnui Marae, creating 35 jobs.

== Education ==
Ohangai School was a coeducational contributing primary (years 1-6) school, which celebrated its centennial in 2006. It opened on 13 February 1906, and was closed in 2012.
