= Kakaramea =

- Interactive map of Kakaramea
- Coordinates: 39°42′34″S 174°26′56″E
- Country: New Zealand
- Region: Taranaki
- District: South Taranaki District
- Ward: Pātea General Ward; Te Tai Tonga Māori Ward
- Community: Pātea Community
- Electorates: Whanganui; Te Tai Hauāuru (Māori)

Government
  - Territorial Authority: South Taranaki District Council
  - Regional council: Taranaki Regional Council
  - Mayor of South Taranaki: Phil Nixon
  - Whanganui MP: Carl Bates
  - Te Tai Hauāuru MP: Debbie Ngarewa-Packer

Area
  - Total: 29.97 km^{2} (11.57 sq mi)

Population (2023 census)
  - Total: 219
  - Density: 7.31/km^{2} (18.9/sq mi)

Kakaramea is a town in South Taranaki, New Zealand. State Highway 3 passes through it. Pātea is about 6 km to the south-east, and Hāwera is about 20 km to the north-west.

== Demographics ==
Kakaramea locality covers 29.97 km^{2} (11.57 sq mi). The locality is part of the larger Manutahi-Waitōtora statistical area.

Historical population
Year	Pop.	±% p.a.
2006	237	—
2013	252	+0.88%
2018	225	−2.24%
2023	219	−0.54%

Kakaramea had a population of 219 in the 2023 New Zealand census, a decrease of 6 people (−2.7%) since the 2018 census, and a decrease of 33 people (−13.1%) since the 2013 census. There were 117 males and 102 females in 87 dwellings. 1.4% of people identified as LGBTIQ+. There were 45 people (20.5%) aged under 15 years, 48 (21.9%) aged 15 to 29, 99 (45.2%) aged 30 to 64, and 24 (11.0%) aged 65 or older.

People could identify as more than one ethnicity. The results were 79.5% European (Pākehā), 31.5% Māori, 1.4% Pasifika, and 2.7% Asian. English was spoken by 95.9%, Māori by 9.6%, and other languages by 2.7%. No language could be spoken by 4.1% (e.g. too young to talk). The percentage of people born overseas was 6.8, compared with 28.8% nationally.

Religious affiliations were 26.0% Christian, 2.7% Māori religious beliefs, 1.4% Buddhist, 2.7% New Age, and 1.4% other religions. People who answered that they had no religion were 58.9%, and 8.2% of people did not answer the census question.

Of those at least 15 years old, 12 (6.9%) people had a bachelor's or higher degree, 108 (62.1%) had a post-high school certificate or diploma, and 54 (31.0%) people exclusively held high school qualifications. 15 people (8.6%) earned over $100,000 compared to 12.1% nationally. The employment status of those at least 15 was 84 (48.3%) full-time, 27 (15.5%) part-time, and 12 (6.9%) unemployed.

== Marae ==
The local Pariroa Marae is a traditional meeting ground for the Ngāti Ruanui hapū of Ngāti Hine, Ngāti Kōtuku, Ngāti Ringi, Ngāti Tūpito and Tuatahi. It features the Taiporohēnui meeting house.

In October 2020, the Government committed $1,479,479 from the Provincial Growth Fund to renovate Meremere Marae, Ketemarae Pā, Pariroa Marae and Taiporohēnui Marae, creating 35 jobs.

== Education ==
Kakaramea School is a coeducational contributing primary (years 1–6) school with a decile rating of 5 and a roll of 62 (July 2026). The school and district celebrated their 125th anniversary in 2001.

== Transport ==
South Road, part of State Highway 3, passes through Kakaramea, running west towards Hāwera and Mokoia and east towards Pātea. Southlink buses connect Kakaramea to those towns twice a week.

Kakaramea railway station was located on the Marton-New Plymouth line along Kakaramea Road. It opened on 28 August 1883 and closed 20 July 1980.
