= Whenuakura =

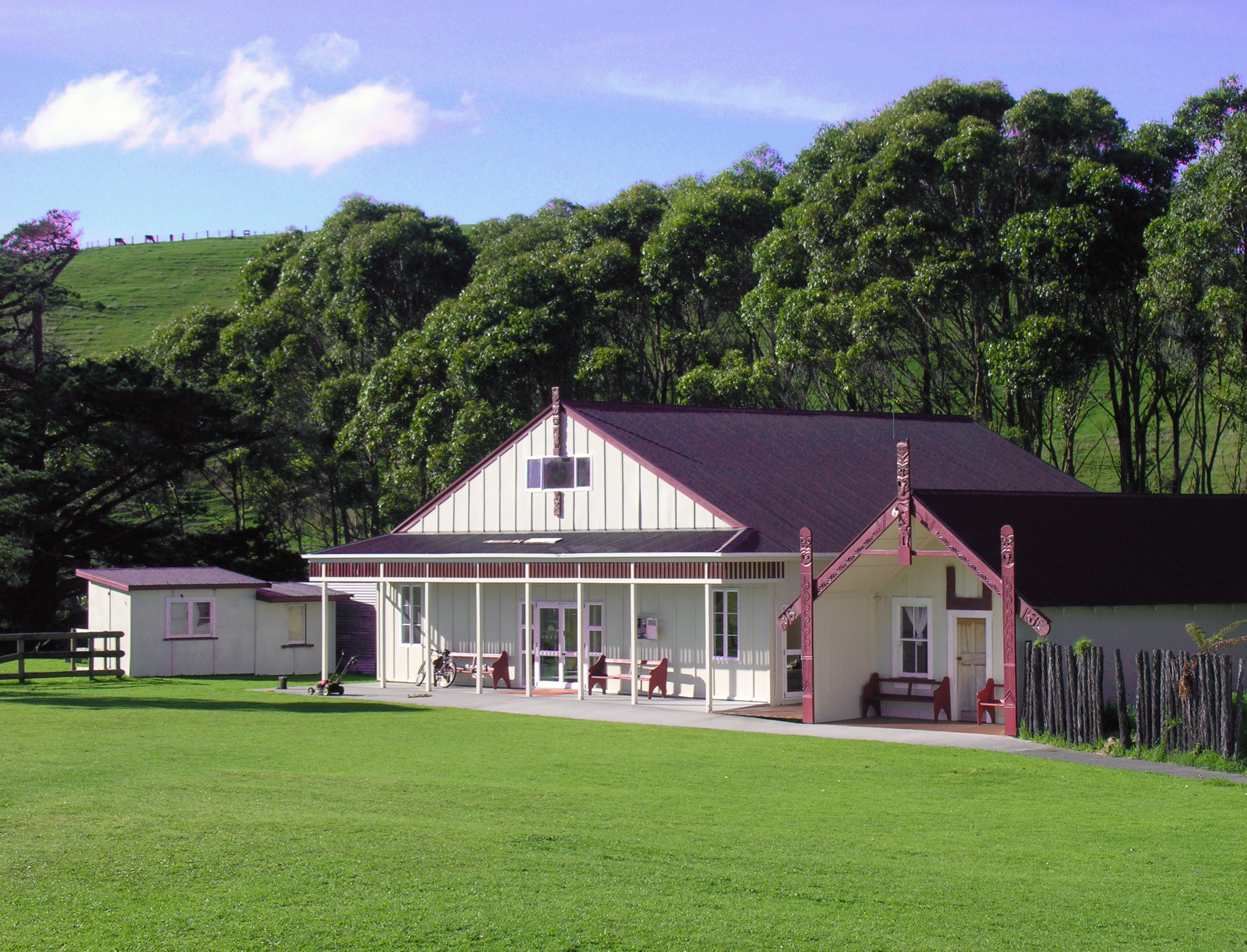
- Whenuakura Marae
- Interactive map of Whenuakura
- Coordinates: 39°44′8″S 174°31′23″E
- Country: New Zealand
- Region: Taranaki
- District: South Taranaki District
- Ward: Pātea General Ward; Te Tai Tonga Māori Ward
- Community: Pātea Community
- Electorates: Whanganui; Te Tai Hauāuru (Māori)

Government
  - Territorial Authority: South Taranaki District Council
  - Regional council: Taranaki Regional Council
  - Mayor of South Taranaki: Phil Nixon
  - Whanganui MP: Carl Bates
  - Te Tai Hauāuru MP: Debbie Ngarewa-Packer

Area
  - Total: 49.98 km^{2} (19.30 sq mi)

Population (2023 census)
  - Total: 192
  - Density: 3.84/km^{2} (9.95/sq mi)

Whenuakura is a farming community on State Highway 3 east of Pātea, at the southern end of Taranaki on the North Island of New Zealand. The boundary between the Taranaki and Wellington provinces runs through Whenuakura. There is the Whenuakura Primary School and Whenuakura Hall. Whenuakura is also bounded by the Pātea and Whenuakura rivers.

The New Zealand golfer Michael Campbell, winner of the 2005 US Open, descends from these iwi. He spent his early childhood at Whenuakura and learned to play golf at the Patea Golf Club about 8 km to the west.

== Demographics ==
Whenuakura locality covers 49.98 km^{2} (19.30 sq mi). The locality is part of the larger Manutahi-Waitōtora statistical area.

Historical population
Year	Pop.	±% p.a.
2006	231	—
2013	192	−2.61%
2018	210	+1.81%
2023	192	−1.78%
The 2006 population is for a smaller area of 44.31 km^{2}. Source:

Whenuakura had a population of 192 in the 2023 New Zealand census, a decrease of 18 people (−8.6%) since the 2018 census, and unchanged since the 2013 census. There were 108 males and 78 females in 81 dwellings. 1.6% of people identified as LGBTIQ+. There were 54 people (28.1%) aged under 15 years, 24 (12.5%) aged 15 to 29, 84 (43.8%) aged 30 to 64, and 27 (14.1%) aged 65 or older.

People could identify as more than one ethnicity. The results were 78.1% European (Pākehā), 23.4% Māori, 1.6% Pasifika, 6.2% Asian, and 3.1% other, which includes people giving their ethnicity as "New Zealander". English was spoken by 98.4%, Māori by 6.2%, and other languages by 6.2%. No language could be spoken by 1.6% (e.g. too young to talk). The percentage of people born overseas was 10.9, compared with 28.8% nationally.

Religious affiliations were 39.1% Christian, 4.7% Māori religious beliefs, and 1.6% other religions. People who answered that they had no religion were 46.9%, and 7.8% of people did not answer the census question.

Of those at least 15 years old, 18 (13.0%) people had a bachelor's or higher degree, 84 (60.9%) had a post-high school certificate or diploma, and 36 (26.1%) people exclusively held high school qualifications. 12 people (8.7%) earned over $100,000 compared to 12.1% nationally. The employment status of those at least 15 was 78 (56.5%) full-time and 24 (17.4%) part-time.

== Marae ==
Whenuakura Pā near the Whenuakura River bridge is the pā marae of the Kairakau and Pamatangi hapū. Families at this pā descend from Nga Rauru, Ngati Ruanui or Ngāti Hine. All descend from Rangitawhi and Aotea waka. The pā includes the Matangirei meeting house.

In October 2020, the Government committed $229,345 from the Provincial Growth Fund to upgrade the marae, creating 8 jobs.

== Education ==
Whenuakura School is a coeducational contributing primary (years 1–6) school with a roll of 30 as of July 2026. The school was founded in 1878 and celebrated 125 years of education in the district in 2002.
