= Mokoia =

- Interactive map of Mokoia
- Coordinates: 39°37′34″S 174°22′7″E
- Country: New Zealand
- Region: Taranaki
- District: South Taranaki District
- Ward: Te Hāwera General Ward; Te Tai Tonga Māori Ward
- Community: Te Hāwera Community
- Electorates: Whanganui; Te Tai Hauāuru (Māori)

Government
  - Territorial Authority: South Taranaki District Council
  - Regional council: Taranaki Regional Council
  - Mayor of South Taranaki: Phil Nixon
  - Whanganui MP: Carl Bates
  - Te Tai Hauāuru MP: Debbie Ngarewa-Packer

Area
  - Total: 56.74 km^{2} (21.91 sq mi)

Population (2023)
  - Total: 204
  - Density: 3.60/km^{2} (9.31/sq mi)

Mokoia is a small settlement in south Taranaki, in the western North Island of New Zealand. It is located on State Highway 3, 10 kilometres (6.2 mi) to the east of Hāwera and about 17 km northwest of Pātea.

== History and culture ==
Mokoia is close to the site of Taiporohenui, a wharenui constructed in the 1850s between the Tangahoe and Manawapou rivers. The structure was 27.6 metres long and 9.2 metres wide, which at the time was one of the largest wharenui ever built in New Zealand.

The settlement of Mokoia was founded in 1867. Early settlers farmed sheep, cattle and horses. A flour mill was run by local Māori. A creamery was built in 1904 and expanded into a dairy factory in 1908. It expanded to include cheese-making in 1913, and again to produce casein in 1923, and closed in 1970.

A meteorite exploded above Mokoia on 26 November 1908, showering the area with fragments. It made international headlines. Two large fragments were recovered from the farm of Cecil Hawken by the Curator of the Wanganui Public Museum, George Marriner, and pieces taken from these are now held in collections all over the world.

Mokoia was one of the areas where soldiers were given rehab farms after World War II.

The Rimu A1 well struck oil on the coast near Mokoia in December 1999, and eight more wells for oil and natural gas were subsequently developed by Swift Petroleum. The Rimu Production Station opened in 2002.

=== Marae ===
The Mokoia Marae and meeting house is a meeting place for the Ngāti Ruanui hapū of Ngā Ariki.

== Demographics ==
Mokoia locality covers 56.74 km^{2} (21.91 sq mi). The locality is part of the larger Ohangai statistical area.

Historical population
Year	Pop.	±% p.a.
2006	213	—
2013	198	−1.04%
2018	186	−1.24%
2023	204	+1.86%

Mokoia had a population of 204 in the 2023 New Zealand census, an increase of 18 people (9.7%) since the 2018 census, and an increase of 6 people (3.0%) since the 2013 census. There were 105 males, 93 females, and 6 people of other genders in 69 dwellings. 2.9% of people identified as LGBTIQ+. The median age was 34.5 years (compared with 38.1 years nationally). There were 51 people (25.0%) aged under 15 years, 27 (13.2%) aged 15 to 29, 108 (52.9%) aged 30 to 64, and 15 (7.4%) aged 65 or older.

People could identify as more than one ethnicity. The results were 91.2% European (Pākehā), 16.2% Māori, 2.9% Pasifika, and 2.9% other, which includes people giving their ethnicity as "New Zealander". English was spoken by 98.5%, and other languages by 4.4%. No language could be spoken by 1.5% (e.g. too young to talk). The percentage of people born overseas was 8.8, compared with 28.8% nationally.

Religious affiliations were 26.5% Christian, and 2.9% Māori religious beliefs. People who answered that they had no religion were 55.9%, and 13.2% of people did not answer the census question.

Of those at least 15 years old, 21 (13.7%) people had a bachelor's or higher degree, 99 (64.7%) had a post-high school certificate or diploma, and 33 (21.6%) people exclusively held high school qualifications. The median income was $52,500, compared with $41,500 nationally. 18 people (11.8%) earned over $100,000 compared to 12.1% nationally. The employment status of those at least 15 was 93 (60.8%) full-time, 24 (15.7%) part-time, and 6 (3.9%) unemployed.

== Education ==
Mokoia School is a coeducational contributing primary (years 1–6) school with a decile rating of 7 and a roll of 22. The first school in the area was built in 1904, but was replaced by the current school in 1944.

== Transport ==
South Road, part of State Highway 3, passes through Manutahi, running west towards Hāwera and east towards Kakaramea and Pātea. Southlink buses connect Manutahi to those towns twice a week.

Mokoia railway station was located on the Marton-New Plymouth line close to the former dairy factory. It closed on 11 December 1976.
