= Normanby, Taranaki =

Settlement in Taranaki Region, New Zealand

Normanby
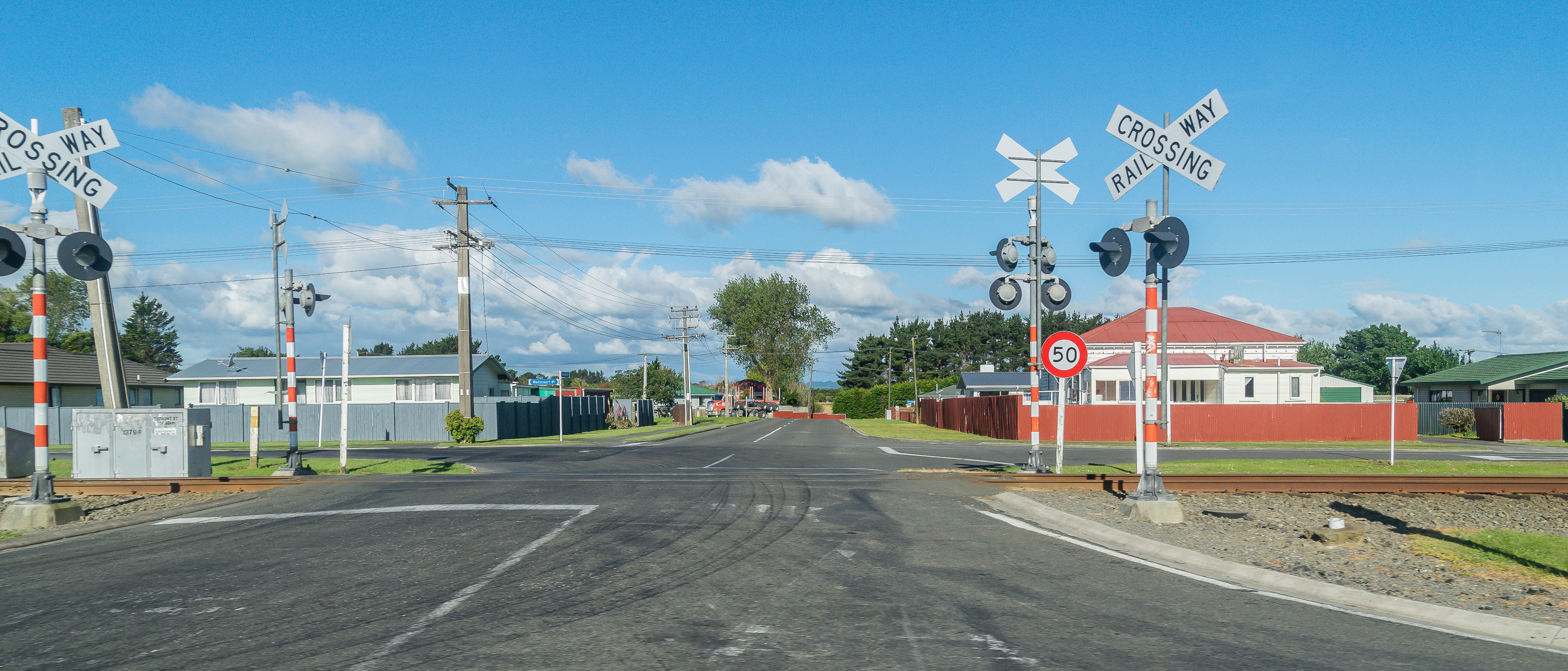
- Egmont Street
- Interactive map of Normanby
- Coordinates: 39°32′28″S 174°16′26″E
- Country: New Zealand
- Region: Taranaki
- Territorial authority: South Taranaki District
- Ward: Te Hāwera General Ward; Te Kūrae Māori Ward; Te Tai Tonga Māori Ward
- Community: Te Hāwera Community
- Electorates: Whanganui; Te Tai Hauāuru (Māori)

Government
  - Territorial Authority: South Taranaki District Council
  - Regional council: Taranaki Regional Council
  - Mayor of South Taranaki: Phil Nixon
  - Whanganui MP: Carl Bates
  - Te Tai Hauāuru MP: Debbie Ngarewa-Packer

Area
  - Total: 1.06 km^{2} (0.41 sq mi)

Population (June 2025)
  - Total: 1,080
  - Density: 1,020/km^{2} (2,640/sq mi)

Normanby is a small village in South Taranaki, New Zealand. It is approximately 6 km inland from Hāwera along State Highway 3. Eltham is 13 km further north.

The village is also situated on the Marton–New Plymouth line railway, which has been freight-only through Normanby since the cessation of passenger railcar services between Wellington and New Plymouth on 30 July 1977.

The town was founded at the site of the Waihi redoubt, which was established as a field headquarters in September 1866 by colonial military forces fighting Hauhau Māori in the Second Taranaki War

== Demographics ==
Normanby is described by Statistics New Zealand as a small urban area and covers 1.06 km^{2} (0.41 sq mi). It had an estimated population of 1,080 as of June 2025, with a population density of 788 people per km^{2}.

Historical population for Normanby
Year	Pop.	±% p.a.
2006	846	—
2013	891	+0.74%
2018	1,029	+2.92%
2023	1,044	+0.29%

Normanby had a population of 1,044 in the 2023 New Zealand census, an increase of 15 people (1.5%) since the 2018 census, and an increase of 153 people (17.2%) since the 2013 census. There were 567 males and 477 females in 354 dwellings. 3.2% of people identified as LGBTIQ+. The median age was 34.9 years (compared with 38.1 years nationally). There were 252 people (24.1%) aged under 15 years, 195 (18.7%) aged 15 to 29, 462 (44.3%) aged 30 to 64, and 132 (12.6%) aged 65 or older.

People could identify as more than one ethnicity. The results were 73.0% European (Pākehā); 42.2% Māori; 5.7% Pasifika; 1.7% Asian; 0.3% Middle Eastern, Latin American and African New Zealanders (MELAA); and 2.9% other, which includes people giving their ethnicity as "New Zealander". English was spoken by 95.4%, Māori by 12.1%, Samoan by 2.6%, and other languages by 2.6%. No language could be spoken by 2.9% (e.g. too young to talk). New Zealand Sign Language was known by 1.4%. The percentage of people born overseas was 8.0, compared with 28.8% nationally.

Religious affiliations were 27.0% Christian, 0.3% Hindu, 1.1% Māori religious beliefs, 0.6% New Age, and 0.9% other religions. People who answered that they had no religion were 63.5%, and 6.9% of people did not answer the census question.

Of those at least 15 years old, 45 (5.7%) people had a bachelor's or higher degree, 453 (57.2%) had a post-high school certificate or diploma, and 297 (37.5%) people exclusively held high school qualifications. The median income was $36,200, compared with $41,500 nationally. 51 people (6.4%) earned over $100,000 compared to 12.1% nationally. The employment status of those at least 15 was 420 (53.0%) full-time, 84 (10.6%) part-time, and 39 (4.9%) unemployed.

=== Tawhiti statistical area ===
Tawhiti statistical area includes an area to the east and southeast of Normanby, extending to the coast. It covers 48.41 km^{2} (18.69 sq mi) and had an estimated population of 800 as of June 2025, with a population density of 17 people per km^{2}.

Historical population for Tawhiti
Year	Pop.	±% p.a.
2006	1,380	—
2013	603	−11.15%
2018	726	+3.78%
2023	759	+0.89%
The 2006 population is for a larger area of 49.50 km^{2} which includes Normanby. Source:

Tawhiti had a population of 759 in the 2023 New Zealand census, an increase of 33 people (4.5%) since the 2018 census, and an increase of 156 people (25.9%) since the 2013 census. There were 390 males and 369 females in 273 dwellings. 1.2% of people identified as LGBTIQ+. The median age was 41.0 years (compared with 38.1 years nationally). There were 159 people (20.9%) aged under 15 years, 126 (16.6%) aged 15 to 29, 363 (47.8%) aged 30 to 64, and 111 (14.6%) aged 65 or older.

People could identify as more than one ethnicity. The results were 88.1% European (Pākehā); 19.8% Māori; 1.6% Pasifika; 2.0% Asian; 0.8% Middle Eastern, Latin American and African New Zealanders (MELAA); and 0.8% other, which includes people giving their ethnicity as "New Zealander". English was spoken by 98.4%, Māori by 6.7%, Samoan by 0.4%, and other languages by 3.6%. No language could be spoken by 0.8% (e.g. too young to talk). New Zealand Sign Language was known by 0.4%. The percentage of people born overseas was 7.9, compared with 28.8% nationally.

Religious affiliations were 34.4% Christian, 0.4% Hindu, 0.8% Islam, 1.2% Māori religious beliefs, 0.4% New Age, and 0.8% other religions. People who answered that they had no religion were 55.7%, and 6.7% of people did not answer the census question.

Of those at least 15 years old, 75 (12.5%) people had a bachelor's or higher degree, 369 (61.5%) had a post-high school certificate or diploma, and 159 (26.5%) people exclusively held high school qualifications. The median income was $49,400, compared with $41,500 nationally. 96 people (16.0%) earned over $100,000 compared to 12.1% nationally. The employment status of those at least 15 was 357 (59.5%) full-time, 78 (13.0%) part-time, and 12 (2.0%) unemployed.

== Ketemarae Pa ==
Located near Normanby is Ketemarae Pa, a local historic centre for Maori settlement. It is an entry point for the Whakaahurangi track to Kairoa Pa, near Lepperton. This track linked northern and southern Taranaki before British settlement.

The site includes the meeting houses of Kumea Mai te Waka and Te Manawanui, and is a meeting place for the Ngāti Ruanui hapū of Araukūku.

In October 2020, the Government committed $1,479,479 from the Provincial Growth Fund to renovate Meremere Marae, Ketemarae Pā, Pariroa Marae and Taiporohēnui Marae, creating 35 jobs.

== Education ==
Normanby School is a coeducational contributing primary (years 1–6) school with a roll of 139 students as of July 2026. The school was established in 1876.

== Climate ==
Climate data for Normanby (1991–2020)
Month	Jan	Feb	Mar	Apr	May	Jun	Jul	Aug	Sep	Oct	Nov	Dec	Year
Mean daily maximum °C (°F)	21.2 (70.2)	21.7 (71.1)	20.1 (68.2)	17.5 (63.5)	15.3 (59.5)	13.2 (55.8)	12.4 (54.3)	13.0 (55.4)	14.4 (57.9)	15.7 (60.3)	17.2 (63.0)	19.4 (66.9)	16.8 (62.2)
Daily mean °C (°F)	16.8 (62.2)	17.2 (63.0)	15.6 (60.1)	13.5 (56.3)	11.6 (52.9)	9.7 (49.5)	8.7 (47.7)	9.4 (48.9)	10.7 (51.3)	11.9 (53.4)	13.3 (55.9)	15.5 (59.9)	12.8 (55.1)
Mean daily minimum °C (°F)	12.4 (54.3)	12.6 (54.7)	11.2 (52.2)	9.5 (49.1)	8.0 (46.4)	6.3 (43.3)	5.1 (41.2)	5.9 (42.6)	6.9 (44.4)	8.2 (46.8)	9.3 (48.7)	11.6 (52.9)	8.9 (48.1)
Average rainfall mm (inches)	62.7 (2.47)	77.2 (3.04)	82.2 (3.24)	102.4 (4.03)	92.5 (3.64)	116.2 (4.57)	128.1 (5.04)	107.5 (4.23)	104.4 (4.11)	127.7 (5.03)	120.0 (4.72)	73.9 (2.91)	1,194.8 (47.03)
Source: NIWA (rain 1981–2010)
