= Normanby, New Zealand =

There are two places in New Zealand called Normanby:

- Normanby, Otago is a suburb of Dunedin
- Normanby, Taranaki is a town in the western North Island
