= Percy Hickey =

New Zealand international rugby union player

- Born: Percival Hubert Hickey; 28 April 1899 Rahotu, New Zealand
- Died: 21 December 1943 (aged 44) Double Bay, Australia
- Weight: 83 kg (183 lb)
- Occupation: Barman

Rugby union career
- Position: Wing Three-quarter
Amateur team(s)
Years	Team	Apps	(Points)
1919–20	Waimate		
1921–22	Clifton		
1925	Poneke		
Provincial / State sides
Years	Team	Apps	(Points)
1919–22	Taranaki	4	
1925	Wellington	1	
International career
Years	Team	Apps	(Points)
1922	New Zealand	2	(0)

Percival "Percy" Hubert Hickey (28 April 1899 – 21 December 1943) was a New Zealand rugby union player who represented the All Blacks in 1922. His position of choice was wing three-quarter.

== Career ==
Hickey was born in Rahotu in 1899. He made the Taranaki provincial side in 1919.

He was selected for the North against South Island match in 1922. He scored a try. He was then selected for the national side on their tour of New South Wales.

Hickey played in two of the possible five matches. He played both of these games out of his regular position. In his second match against New South Wales, Hickey was judged to have committed an obstruction offence and conceded a penalty try. This was considered a part of the 14-8 defeat.

Hickey did not again play for Taranaki nor be chosen for the All Blacks.

However, in 1925 Hickey moved down to Wellington and joined the Poneke club. He made the Wellington provincial team that same year.

He later moved further south to Dunedin and then Double Bay, Sydney, Australia.

== Personal ==
Hickey's wife's name was Winnifred. She worked as a barman in Wellington.
