= Eltham, New Zealand =

Settlement in Taranaki Region, New Zealand

Eltham
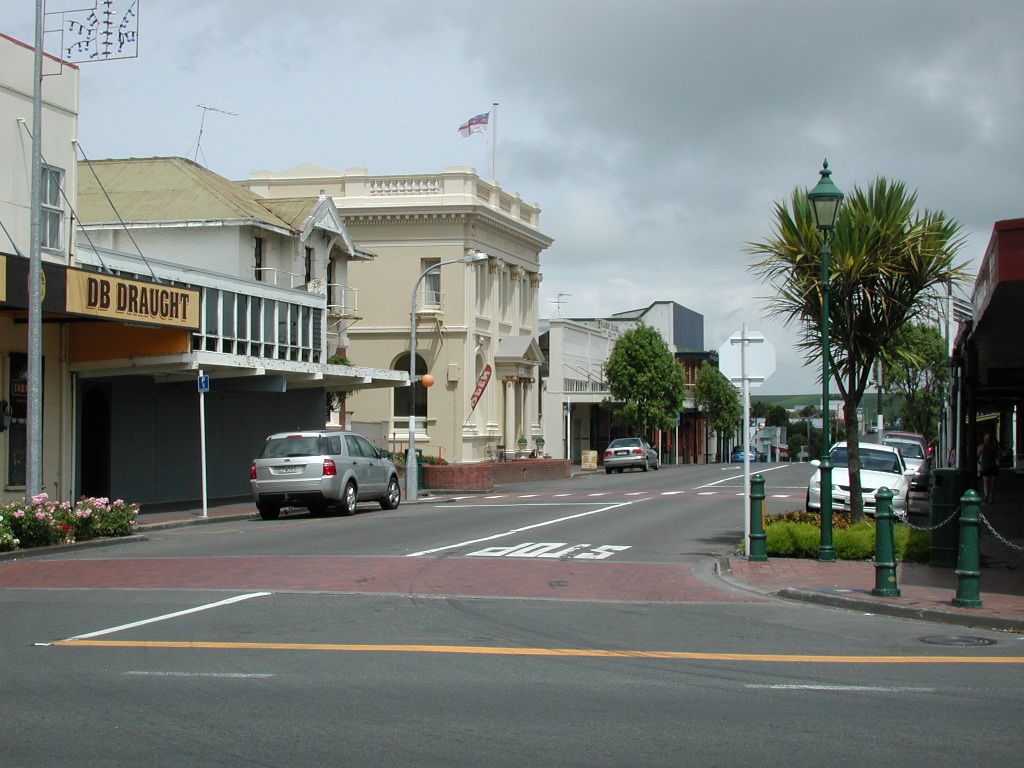
- The town centre of Eltham
- Interactive map of Eltham
- Coordinates: 39°25′47″S 174°17′57″E
- Country: New Zealand
- Region: Taranaki Region
- Territorial authority: South Taranaki District
- Ward: Eltham-Kaponga General Ward; Te Kūrae Māori Ward; Te Tai Tonga Māori Ward
- Community: Eltham-Kaponga Community
- Electorates: Whanganui; Te Tai Hauāuru (Māori)

Government
  - Territorial Authority: South Taranaki District Council
  - Regional council: Taranaki Regional Council
  - Mayor of South Taranaki: Phil Nixon
  - Whanganui MP: Carl Bates
  - Te Tai Hauāuru MP: Debbie Ngarewa-Packer

Area
  - Total: 3.43 km^{2} (1.32 sq mi)

Population (June 2025)
  - Total: 2,120
  - Density: 618/km^{2} (1,600/sq mi)
- Postcode: 4322

Eltham is a small inland town in South Taranaki, New Zealand, located 50 kilometres (31 mi) south of the city of New Plymouth and southeast of the volcanic cone of Mount Taranaki. Stratford is 11 kilometres (6.8 mi) north, Kaponga 13 km (8 mi) west, and Hāwera is 19 km (12 mi) south. State Highway 3 runs through the town.

Eltham is South Taranaki's second largest town.

Eltham is known as the cradle of the Taranaki dairy industry (the co-operative system in particular), and for being the one place in New Zealand that manufactured rennet which is important in cheesemaking. It was also the first place to export butter to England.

== History ==
European settlement began in Eltham in the 1870s, with blocks of densely forested land being taken up mainly to the north of Mountain Road. A profusion of sawmilling companies cleared the district which, when grassed, proved ideal for dairy farming. In 1881 the railway first opened at Eltham, and in 1884, the year Eltham was declared a town district, settlers, mainly from England, arrived there and the town had a population of 25. Eltham was declared a borough in 1901, and became part of South Taranaki District with the local body amalgamations of 1989.

High Street (which runs through the centre of town - as part of State Highway 3 connecting Stratford, Ngaere, Normanby and Hāwera) and Bridge Street (which heads westward towards Kaponga and joins State Highway 45 near Ōpunake), were the first tar-sealed roads in New Zealand.

== Geography ==
=== Rivers and lakes ===
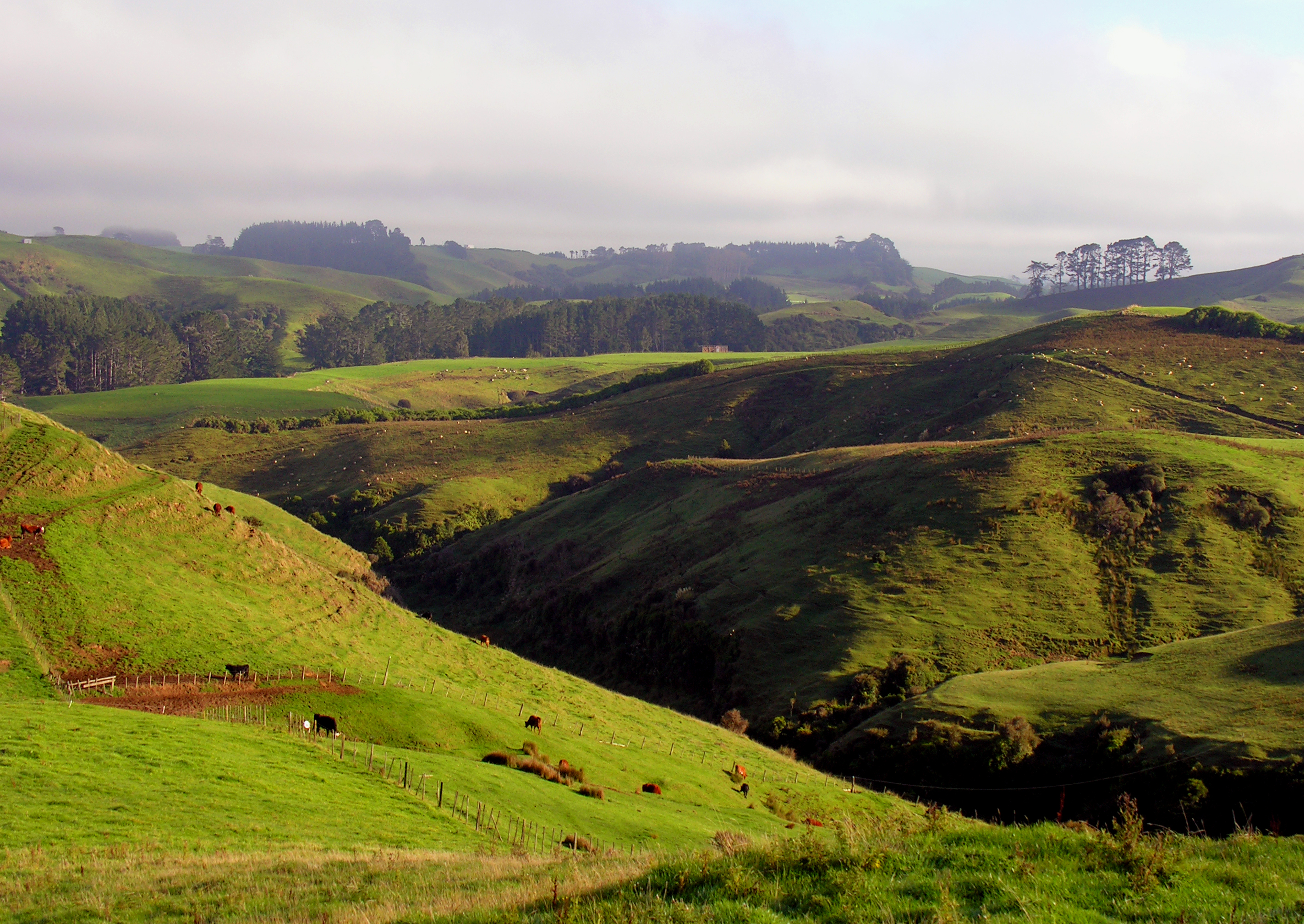
Countryside near Eltham

The two main watercourses which run through Eltham itself are the Mangawharawhara Stream, and the Waingongoro River.

The Mangawharawhara Stream runs to the east of the Main Trunk railway line, flows under the central business district via a culvert, and on past Eltham School and the Eltham Golf Club to the south of the town.

The Waingongoro River forms a western boundary to the town itself, flowing through the Presbyterian Church campsite (in the town's northwest) and Taumata Park (the town's main camping area and sports ground - in the western part of the town) and winding itself southwestward to meet the Tasman Sea at Ohawe Beach, near Hāwera.

Eltham is also the gateway to Lake Rotokare, a scenic, natural lake surrounded by native bush (to the east of the town), and to the man-made Lake Rotorangi.

== Demographics ==
Eltham covers 3.43 km^{2} (1.32 sq mi) and had an estimated population of 2,120 as of June 2025, with a population density of 618 people per km^{2} (1,620 per sq mi).

Historical population
Year	Pop.	±% p.a.
2006	1,899	—
2013	1,875	−0.18%
2018	1,947	+0.76%
2023	2,097	+1.50%
The 2006 population is for a smaller area of 3.41 km^{2}. Source:

Eltham had a population of 2,097 in the 2023 New Zealand census, an increase of 150 people (7.7%) since the 2018 census, and an increase of 222 people (11.8%) since the 2013 census. There were 1,047 males, 1,041 females, and 6 people of other genders in 822 dwellings. 3.3% of people identified as LGBTIQ+. The median age was 40.8 years (compared with 38.1 years nationally). There were 411 people (19.6%) aged under 15 years, 357 (17.0%) aged 15 to 29, 954 (45.5%) aged 30 to 64, and 372 (17.7%) aged 65 or older.

People could identify as more than one ethnicity. The results were 81.7% European (Pākehā); 30.8% Māori; 3.6% Pasifika; 3.1% Asian; 0.3% Middle Eastern, Latin American and African New Zealanders (MELAA); and 2.9% other, which includes people giving their ethnicity as "New Zealander". English was spoken by 97.1%, Māori by 6.9%, Samoan by 0.3%, and other languages by 3.7%. No language could be spoken by 2.0% (e.g. too young to talk). New Zealand Sign Language was known by 0.7%. The percentage of people born overseas was 9.9, compared with 28.8% nationally.

Religious affiliations were 26.9% Christian, 0.1% Hindu, 0.9% Islam, 2.1% Māori religious beliefs, 0.3% Buddhist, 1.1% New Age, and 1.3% other religions. People who answered that they had no religion were 57.9%, and 10.0% of people did not answer the census question.

Of those at least 15 years old, 126 (7.5%) people had a bachelor's or higher degree, 954 (56.6%) had a post-high school certificate or diploma, and 597 (35.4%) people exclusively held high school qualifications. The median income was $32,700, compared with $41,500 nationally. 63 people (3.7%) earned over $100,000 compared to 12.1% nationally. The employment status of those at least 15 was 783 (46.4%) full-time, 198 (11.7%) part-time, and 39 (2.3%) unemployed.

== Local administration ==
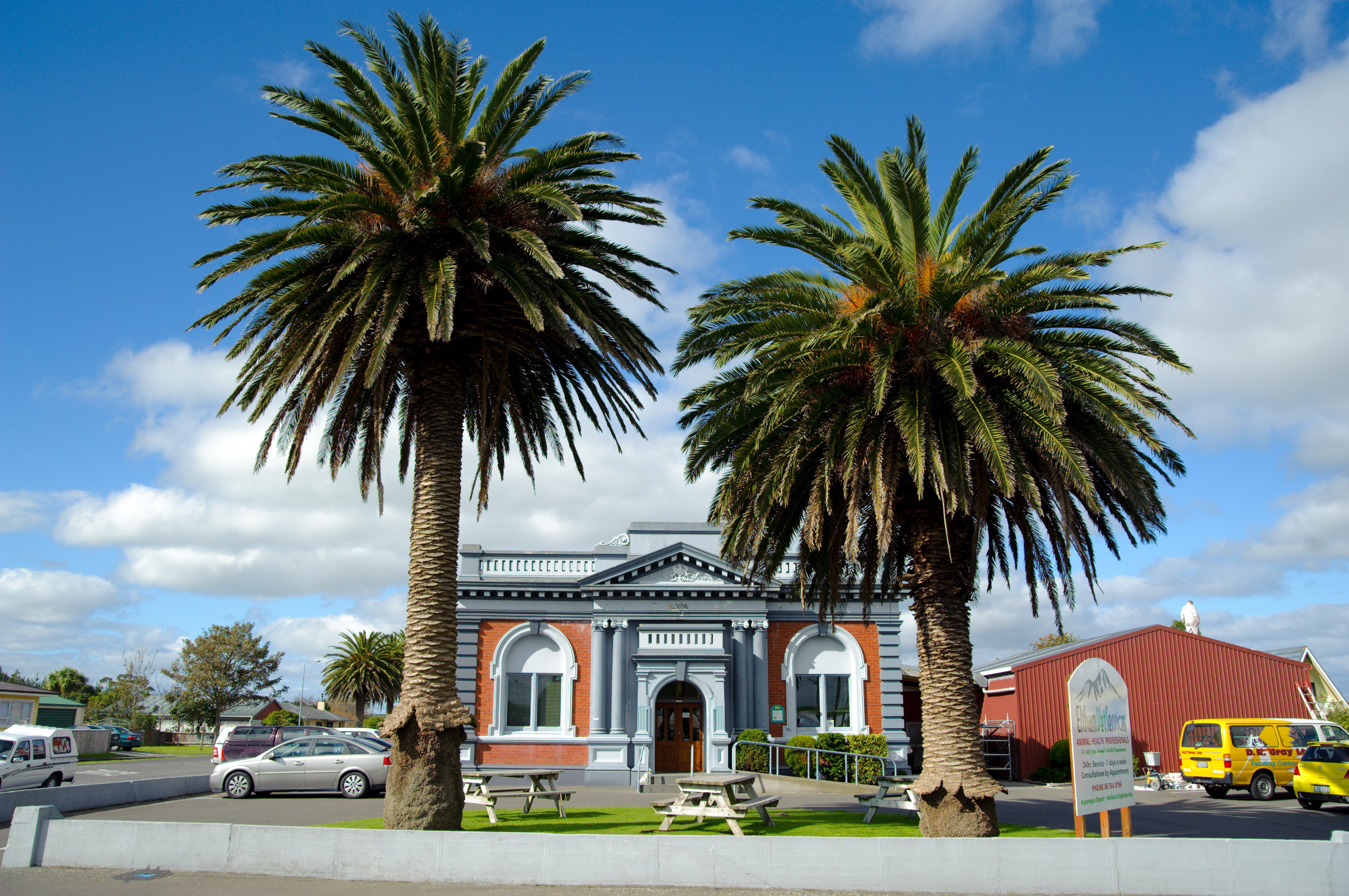
Eltham's old courthouse, now a veterinary clinic

Eltham and the surrounding community enjoys a full library and council service (coming under the aegis of the South Taranaki District Council, based in Hāwera). Services provided include being able to register your dog, pay your rates or inquire about obtaining a building permit. The LibraryPlus is also a NZ Post agency. Other services include a Tot Time for the under 5s and regular ‘coffee and blog’ meetings for locals to learn about new technologies in a friendly environment. The LibraryPlus also has three APN computers, offering free internet and Skype to the public.

== Industry ==
The town's main industry is cheese production, with much of Mainland Cheese's speciality range such as feta and camembert being produced in the Bridge Street factory.

Other cheese products such as the processed cheese used in many burgers are produced at the company's Collingwood Street site, formerly occupied by the Taranaki Co-operative Dairy Company's milk powder plant, but now extensively remodelled.

Cheese has been used as a central symbol of the town, and to reinforce this view, the town's water supply tank was painted to represent a large block of cheese in 2002.

Eltham's other significant industry is the ANZCO (formerly Riverlands) freezing works, which has a satellite plant in Bulls, in Manawatū. Both plants can process up to 1250 head of cattle daily.

== Education ==
Eltham School is a coeducational full primary school (years 1-8), with a roll of 136 as of July 2026. The school was founded in 1886.

== Notable people ==
- Amyas Connell (1901–1980), architect
- Martin Donnelly (1917–1999), cricketer and rugby union player
- Gavin Hill (born 1965), rugby union and rugby league player
- Charles Knight aka Tankboy (born 1967), television producer
- Brian Muller (1942–2019), rugby union player
- Geoff Old (born 1956), rugby union player
- Bryce Robins (born 1980), rugby union player
- Ronald Syme (1903–1989), historian and classicist
- Walter Symes (1852–1914), politician
- Chau Tseung (or Chew Chong) (1828–1920), founder of the factory system of butter manufacture in the late 1880s
- Roger Urbahn (1934–1984), rugby union player
- Stephen Cox (born 1956), New Zealand Olympic Cyclist
