= Chew Chong =

- Traditional Chinese: 周祥
- Simplified Chinese: 周祥
Transcriptions
Standard Mandarin
- Hanyu Pinyin: Zhōu Xiáng
Yue: Cantonese
- Yale Romanization: Jāu Chèuhng
- Jyutping: Zau^{1} Coeng^{4}

Chew Chong (circa 1827 – 7 October 1920) was a Chinese-New Zealand merchant, fungus exporter and butter manufacturer. He was born in Canton, China c. 1827. Chong arrived in New Zealand in 1867 among 1,185 other Chinese immigrants who were drawn to the Otago region amidst a gold rush.

== Life in Taranaki ==
One of Chong's earliest ventures included buying wood-ear fungus, dubbed "Taranaki wool" by the locals, which he would sell for 6 shillings a sack. He traversed the region on horse and cart, often visiting isolated farm houses, to sell sugar, farm tools, tea, flour and children's toys. He is credited with the discovery that this edible fungus was a "marketable product for New Zealand." In 1873 Chong established his first shop in New Plymouth, where he also resided. In 1875, at a time in New Zealand when interracial marriage was almost completely unheard of, he married Elizabeth Whatton, with whom he would have 11 children. By 1882, Chong had expanded his business and opened stores in the Taranaki towns of Ōkato, Inglewood, Hāwera and Eltham.

His Eltham outlet was to become the most successful, eventually expanding to become a stable, blacksmith, bakery and butchery. At all his stores, Chong bought milk from local farmers which he would process at his butter factory, located just outside of Eltham, from 1887. The factory was judged by the Government's dairy inspector as the best he had seen. In 1888, Chong was credited with installing the first refrigeration unit at a New Zealand butter factory. He has thus been described as a "pioneer" and “the originator of the dairy factory system”. Chong won an award for the best 500 kg of export butter at the New Zealand and South Seas Exhibition in Dunedin. The butter was manufactured at Chong's Jubilee dairy factory on the banks of the Waingongoro River at Eltham. The trophy is now part of the Puke Ariki collection in New Plymouth.

== Later life and legacy ==
After his retirement, Chong returned to China for six months in 1905. When he returned to New Zealand, he took up various hobbies including entertaining children. Chong had a cat named Fungus.

In 1996, Chong was inducted into the New Zealand Business Hall of Fame. He is the grandfather of Taranaki cartoonist Brian Chong and great-grandfather to New Plymouth District Councillor and 2017 New Zealand First candidate Murray Chong.
