= Ngāti Tara =

Ngāti Tara may refer to:

- Ngāti Tara (Paeroa), a tribe of Paeroa, New Zealand
- Ngāti Tara, a subtribe of Taranaki, a tribe of Taranaki, New Zealand
