= Taranaki (iwi) =

Māori iwi (tribe) in Aotearoa New Zealand

Taranaki (Tuturu)
- Iwi (tribe) in Māoridom
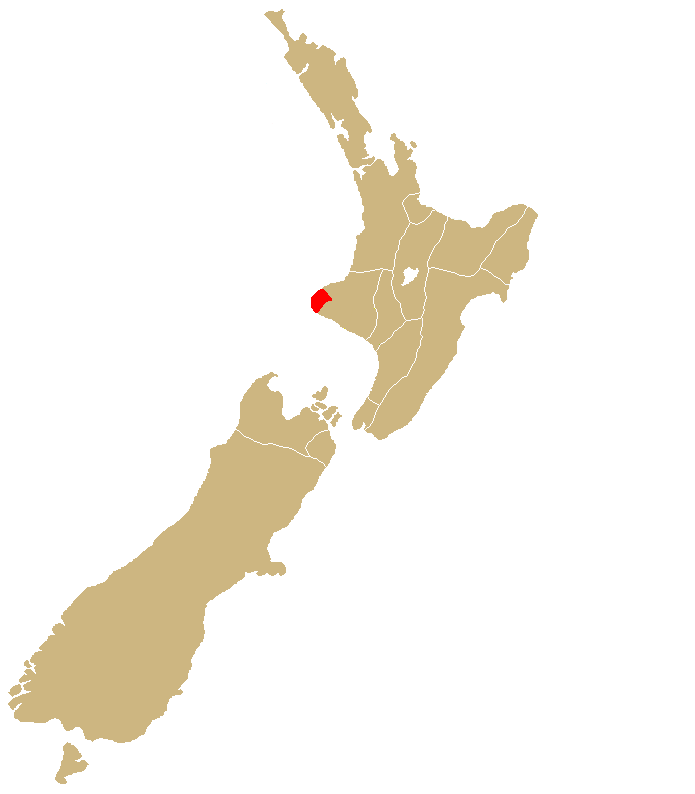
- Website: www.taranaki.iwi.nz

Taranaki (Tuturu) is a Māori iwi of New Zealand.

Taranaki iwi were an important part of the First and Second Taranaki Wars. At least 13 members of Taranaki died during the First Taranaki War, mostly defending Waireka on 28 March 1860, including Paora Kūkūtai (chief of the Patukai hapū) and Paratene te Kopara (chief of Ngā Māhanga a Tairi).

Wellington pan-tribal Māori radio station Te Upoko O Te Ika has been affiliated to Taranaki since 2014. It began part-time broadcasting in 1983 and full-time broadcasting in 1987, and it is New Zealand's longest-running Māori radio station.

Radio station Te Korimako O Taranaki is affiliated with Taranaki and other local iwi, including Ngāti Tama, Te Ātiawa, Ngāi Maru, Ngāruahine, Ngāti Mutunga, Ngāti Ruanui, and Ngā Rauru Kiitahi. It started at the Bell Block campus of Taranaki Polytechnic in 1992, and moved to the Spotswood campus in 1993. It is available on 94.8 FM across Taranaki.

== See also ==
- List of Māori iwi
