= Te Tai Hauāuru =

Coordinates: 39.9333°S 175.0500°E

- Single-member Māori constituency for the New Zealand House of Representatives
- Formation: 1996
- Region: Waikato; Taranaki; Manawatū-Whanganui; Wellington; Hawke's Bay (Ngamahanga)
- Character: Urban and rural
- Term: 3 years

Member for Te Tai Hauāuru
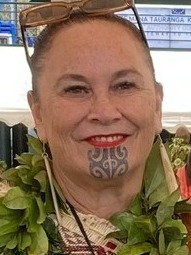
- Debbie Ngarewa-Packer since 14 October 2023
- Party: Te Pāti Māori
- Previous MP: Adrian Rurawhe (Labour)
Party vote distribution

Te Tai Hauāuru (lit. 'The West Coast') is a New Zealand parliamentary Māori electorate, returning one Member of Parliament to the New Zealand House of Representatives, that was first formed for the 1996 election. The electorate was represented by Tariana Turia from 2002 to 2014, first for the Labour Party and then for the Māori Party. Turia retired and was succeeded in 2014 by Labour's Adrian Rurawhe who retained the seat in 2017 and again in 2020. The current seat holder is Debbie Ngarewa-Packer who won the seat in 2023.

== Population centres ==
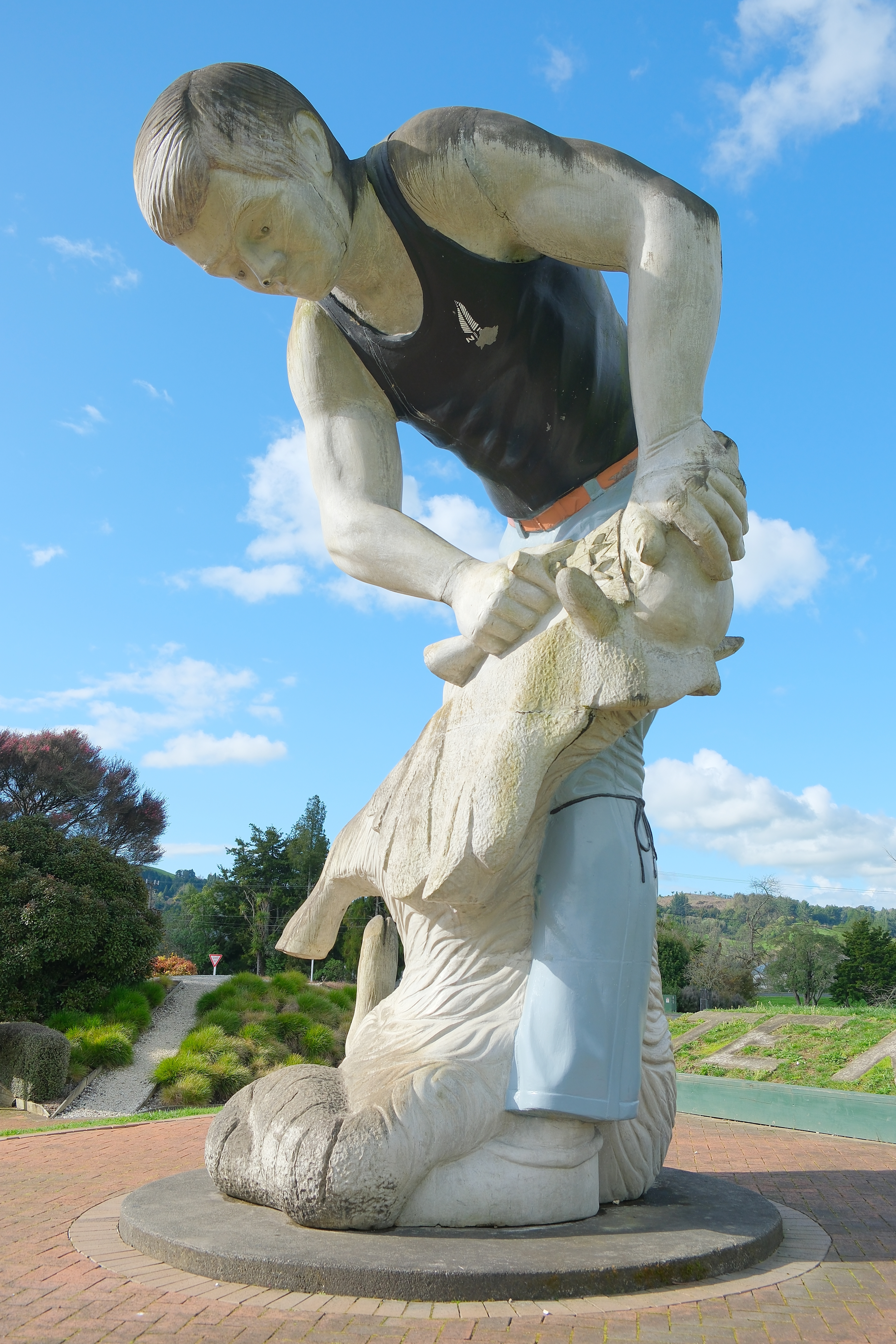
Te Kūiti statue

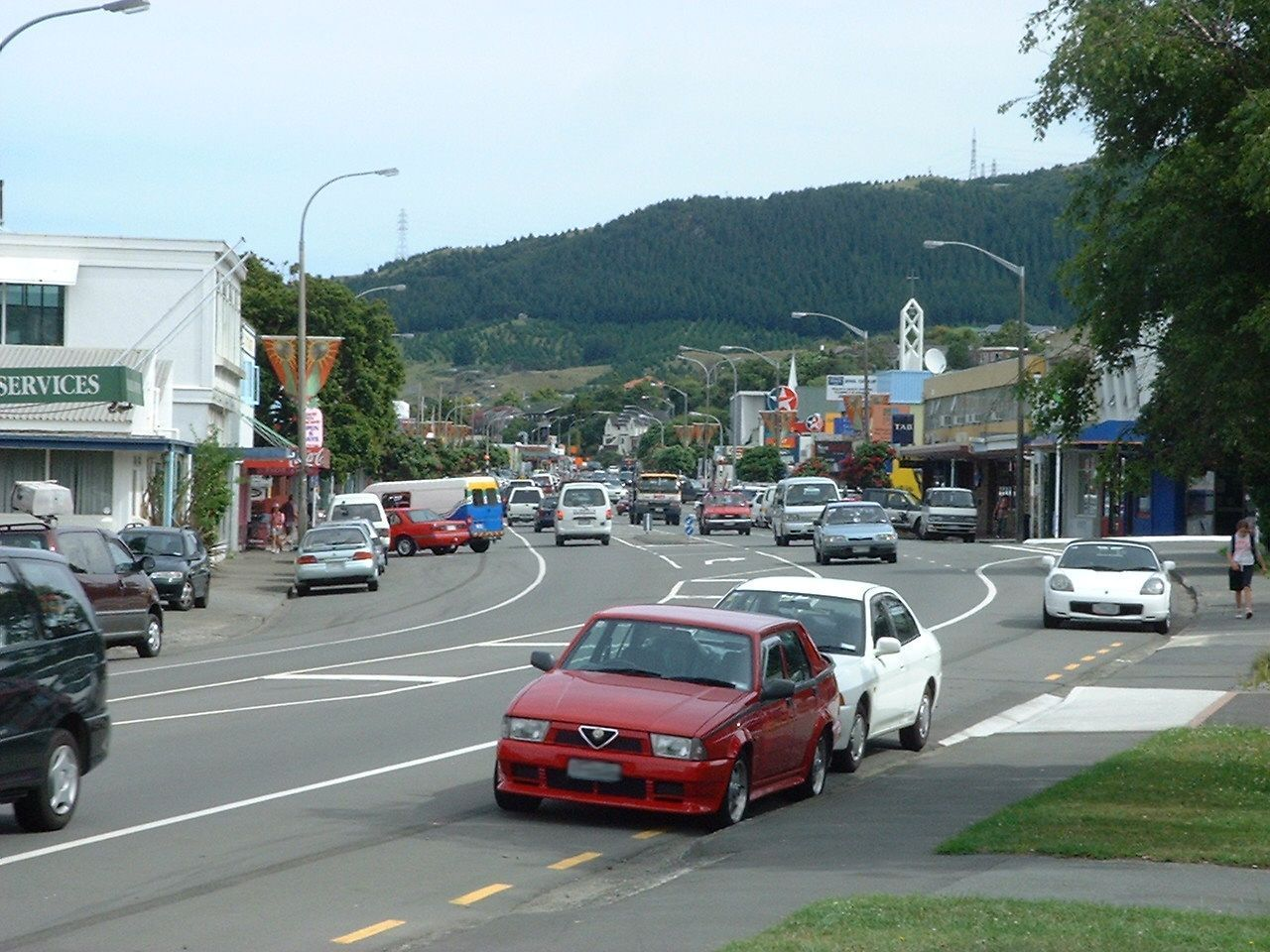
Tawa Main street

Te Tai Hauāuru was created ahead of the first MMP election in 1996. Te Tai Hauāuru covers the western North Island, starting in the South Waikato before heading south through the King Country towns of Te Kūiti and Taumarunui to include all of the Taranaki region and all towns in the Manawatū-Whanganui region west of the Manawatū Gorge. Its southern terminus is in Wellington at Tawa. The main population centres are Tokoroa, New Plymouth, Whanganui, Palmerston North and Porirua. It has a very small Hawke's Bay settlement Ngamahanga which is in this catchment. It is also home of the politically influential Rātana movement.

In the 2007 boundary redistribution, the area covered by the Ngāti Maniapoto tribe was transferred from the Tainui electorate to Te Tai Hauāuru. The boundaries were not further altered in the 2013/14 redistribution.

== History ==
The seat includes the Ngāti Tama, Ngāti Mutunga, Ngāti Maru (Taranaki), Te Āti Awa, Taranaki, Ngā Ruahine, Ngāti Ruanui, Ngā Rauru, Te Āti Haunui-a-Pāpārangi, Ngāti Apa, Ngāti Hauiti, Ngāti Raukawa ki te Tonga, Ngāti Kauwhata, Rangitāne, Muaūpoko, Ngāti Toa, Ngāti Maniapoto and Ngāti Huia tribal areas (rohe).

Te Tai Hauāuru was first used at the 1996 election and contained all area from South Auckland to just south of Te Kūiti. It was the growth of the Māori population leading to the creation first of Tāmaki Makaurau in 1999 and Tainui in 2002 that has pulled Ta Tai Hauāuru so far south that the only remaining part of the 1996 seat is its name.

Te Tai Hauāuru was won by New Zealand First candidate Tuku Morgan in its first contest, in what would be a clean sweep by New Zealand First of the five Māori seats that year. Discontent with New Zealand First's behaviour in government led to a reconciliation between Māori voters and the Labour Party, albeit briefly; the introduction of the Seabed and Foreshore bill to Parliament by the ruling Labour Party lead to a schism between the party and a significant section of its Māori voter base, including the MP for Te Tai Hauāuru, Tariana Turia. Turia resigned her seat to re-contest the seat in a 2004 by-election as the leader of the new Māori Party. She won 92.7 percent of the vote in a contest that Labour refused to participate in. In 2005, Turia was re-elected with nearly double the votes of her Labour rival, Errol Mason. In common with most of the Māori seats, Labour took a majority of the party vote. The results in 2008 were similar. Turia confirmed in November 2013 that she would retire at the 2014 election. She was succeeded by Adrian Rurawhe of the Labour Party, who defeated Chris McKenzie of the Māori Party.

The electorate became important for the Māori party again in 2020, as it was broadly considered the party's best chance at winning an electorate and returning to parliament. However, a poll released a few weeks before the election suggested that Labour's incumbent had a substantial lead over the Māori Party candidate, Debbie Ngarewa-Packer.

=== Members of Parliament ===
Key

NZ First Mauri Pacific Labour Te Pāti Māori

Election	Winner
1996 election	Tuku Morgan
1999 election	Nanaia Mahuta
2002 election	Tariana Turia
2004 by-election	Tariana Turia
2005 election	Tariana Turia
2008 election	Tariana Turia
2011 election	Tariana Turia
2014 election	Adrian Rurawhe
2017 election	Adrian Rurawhe
2020 election	Adrian Rurawhe
2023 election	Debbie Ngarewa-Packer

=== List MPs ===
Members of Parliament elected from party lists in elections where that person also unsuccessfully contested the Te Tai Hauāuru electorate. Unless otherwise stated, all MPs terms began and ended at general elections.

Election	Winner
1996 election	Nanaia Mahuta
2020 election	Debbie Ngarewa-Packer

== Election results ==
=== 2026 election ===
The next election will be held on 7 November 2026. Candidates for Te Tai Hauāuru are listed at Candidates in the 2026 New Zealand general election by electorate § Te Tai Hauāuru. Official results will be available after 27 November 2026.

=== 2023 election ===
2023 general election: Te Tai Hauāuru
Notes:	Blue background denotes the winner of the electorate vote. Pink background denotes a candidate elected from their party list. Yellow background denotes an electorate win by a list member, or other incumbent. A ✓ or ✗ denotes status of any incumbent, win or lose respectively.						
Party	Candidate	Votes	%	±%	Party votes	%	±%
Te Pāti Māori	Debbie Ngarewa-Packer	16,288	62.31	+19.02	9,529	35.05	+19.60
Labour	Soraya Peke-Mason	7,126	27.26	–20.14	11,123	40.91	–20.12
National	Harete Hipango	1,416	5.41	–	1,248	4.59	+1.60
Vision NZ	Paris Winiata	704	2.69	–			
Green					2,091	7.69	+0.98
NZ First					1,140	4.19	+0.68
NZ Loyal					351	1.29	–
Legalise Cannabis					299	1.09	–1.01
ACT					284	1.04	–0.16
Freedoms NZ					219	0.80	–
Opportunities					178	0.65	–0.34
NewZeal					137	0.50	–0.29
Animal Justice					32	0.11	–
DemocracyNZ					31	0.11	–
Women's Rights					20	0.07	–
Leighton Baker Party					18	0.06	–
New Conservatives					17	0.06	–0.26
New Nation					6	0.02	–
Informal votes		603			461		
Total valid votes		26,137			27,184		
Te Pāti Māori gain from Labour	Majority	9,162	35.05	+30.94			

=== 2020 election ===
2020 general election: Te Tai Hauāuru
Notes:	Blue background denotes the winner of the electorate vote. Pink background denotes a candidate elected from their party list. Yellow background denotes an electorate win by a list member, or other incumbent. A ✓ or ✗ denotes status of any incumbent, win or lose respectively.						
Party	Candidate	Votes	%	±%	Party votes	%	±%
Labour	✓ Adrian Rurawhe	12,160	47.40	+3.54	16,022	61.03	+2.56
Māori Party	Debbie Ngarewa-Packer	11,107	43.29	+4.08	4,055	15.45	+0.47
Advance NZ	Noeline Apiata	787	3.07	−	700	2.67	−
ONE	Korrallie Bailey-Taurua	333	1.30	−	208	0.79	−
Outdoors	Kiri McKee	317	1.24	−	44	0.17	+0.14
New Conservative	Joshua Morgan	248	0.97	−	85	0.32	+0.25
Green					1,762	6.71	+0.18
NZ First					922	3.51	−3.75
National					786	2.99	−3.55
Legalise Cannabis					550	2.10	+0.63
ACT					316	1.20	+1.12
Opportunities					260	0.99	−1.86
Vision NZ					119	0.45	–
Social Credit					9	0.03	+0.01
Sustainable NZ					4	0.02	—
TEA					4	0.02	–
Heartland					2	0.01	—
Informal votes		704			404		
Total valid votes		25,656			26,252		
Labour hold	Majority	1,053	4.11	−0.55			

=== 2017 election ===
2017 general election: Te Tai Hauāuru
Notes:	Blue background denotes the winner of the electorate vote. Pink background denotes a candidate elected from their party list. Yellow background denotes an electorate win by a list member, or other incumbent. A ✓ or ✗ denotes status of any incumbent, win or lose respectively.						
Party	Candidate	Votes	%	±%	Party votes	%	±%
Labour	✓ Adrian Rurawhe	9,791	43.86	+2.52	13,475	58.47	+16.24
Māori Party	Howie Tamati	8,752	39.21	+5.81	3,448	14.96	−2.68
Green	Jack McDonald	2,798	12.53	−2.82	1,507	6.53	−5.40
Independent	Wikitoria Waitai-Rapana	410	1.83	—			
NZ First					1,675	7.26	−4.53
National					1,509	6.54	−0.57
Opportunities					658	2.85	—
Legalise Cannabis					221	0.95	−0.42
Mana					160	0.69	−6.13
Ban 1080					52	0.22	+0.01
ACT					20	0.08	−0.05
People's Party					20	0.08	—
Conservative					17	0.07	−0.50
Outdoors					8	0.03	—
Internet					6	0.02	−6.80
United Future					6	0.02	−0.05
Democrats					2	0.008	−0.002
Informal votes		568			260		
Total valid votes		22,319			23,044		
Labour hold	Majority	1,039	4.66	−3.28			

=== 2014 election ===
2014 general election: Te Tai Hauāuru
Notes:	Blue background denotes the winner of the electorate vote. Pink background denotes a candidate elected from their party list. Yellow background denotes an electorate win by a list member, or other incumbent. A ✓ or ✗ denotes status of any incumbent, win or lose respectively.						
Party	Candidate	Votes	%	±%	Party votes	%	±%
Labour	Adrian Rurawhe	8,089	41.34	+11.49	8,642	42.23	+0.20
Māori Party	Chris McKenzie	6,535	33.40	−14.90	3,611	17.64	−3.41
Green	Jack McDonald	3,004	15.35	+3.86	2,442	11.93	+0.76
Mana	Jordan Winiata	1,940	9.91	+1.24			
NZ First					2,412	11.79	+3.85
National					1,456	7.11	−0.70
Internet Mana					1,395	6.82	−1.42 (Note: 2014 Internet Mana swing is relative to the votes for Mana in 2011; it shared a party list with Internet in the 2014 election.)
Legalise Cannabis					281	1.37	+0.30
Conservative					116	0.57	+0.20
Ban 1080					43	0.21	+0.21
ACT					27	0.13	0.00
United Future					15	0.07	−0.07
Independent Coalition					15	0.07	+0.07
Civilian					6	0.03	+0.03
Democrats					3	0.01	−0.01
Focus					1	0.001	+0.001
Informal votes		542			234		
Total valid votes		20,110			20,699		
Labour gain from Māori Party	Majority	1,554	7.94				

=== 2011 election ===
2011 general election: Te Tai Hauāuru
Notes:	Blue background denotes the winner of the electorate vote. Pink background denotes a candidate elected from their party list. Yellow background denotes an electorate win by a list member, or other incumbent. A ✓ or ✗ denotes status of any incumbent, win or lose respectively.						
Party	Candidate	Votes	%	±%	Party votes	%	±%
Māori Party	✓ Tariana Turia	8,433	48.30	−22.28	3,829	21.05	−9.71
Labour	Soraya Peke-Mason	5,212	29.85	+0.43	7,645	42.03	−8.62
Green	Jack McDonald	2,007	11.49	+11.49	2,031	11.17	+7.64
Mana	Frederick Timutimu	1,513	8.67	+8.67	1,499	8.24	+8.24
Nga Iwi	Jennifer Waitai-Rapana	178	1.02	+1.02			
Sovereignty Party	Robert Piriniha Wilson	118	0.68	+0.68			
NZ First					1,445	7.94	+2.73
National					1,421	7.81	+2.73
Legalise Cannabis					195	1.07	−0.15
Conservative					67	0.37	+0.37
United Future					25	0.14	+0.02
ACT					23	0.13	−0.27
Democrats					4	0.02	-0.003
Libertarianz					3	0.02	+0.01
Alliance					1	0.01	−0.01
Informal votes		754			452		
Total valid votes		17,461			18,188		
Māori Party hold	Majority	3,221	18.45	−22.71			

Electorate (as at 26 November 2011): 32,617

=== 2008 election ===
2008 general election: Te Tai Hauāuru
Notes:	Blue background denotes the winner of the electorate vote. Pink background denotes a candidate elected from their party list. Yellow background denotes an electorate win by a list member, or other incumbent. A ✓ or ✗ denotes status of any incumbent, win or lose respectively.						
Party	Candidate	Votes	%	±%	Party votes	%	±%
Māori Party	✓ Tariana Turia	13,406	70.58		6,076	30.76	
Labour	Errol Mason	5,589	29.42		10,005	50.66	
National					1,298	6.57	
NZ First					1,029	5.21	
Green					697	3.53	
Legalise Cannabis					242	1.23	
Bill and Ben					120	0.61	
Family Party					95	0.48	
ACT					79	0.40	
Progressive					36	0.18	
United Future					24	0.12	
Kiwi					22	0.11	
Pacific					9	0.05	
Workers Party					6	0.03	
Democrats					5	0.03	
RONZ					4	0.02	
Alliance					3	0.02	
Libertarianz					1	0.01	
RAM					0	0.00	
Informal votes		676			359		
Total valid votes		18,995			19,751		
Māori Party hold	Majority	7,817	41.15				

=== 2005 election ===
2005 general election: Te Tai Hauāuru
Notes:	Blue background denotes the winner of the electorate vote. Pink background denotes a candidate elected from their party list. Yellow background denotes an electorate win by a list member, or other incumbent. A ✓ or ✗ denotes status of any incumbent, win or lose respectively.						
Party	Candidate	Votes	%	±%	Party votes	%	±%
Māori Party	✓ Tariana Turia	10,922	62.98		5,739	31.68	
Labour	Errol Mason	5,809	33.49		9,619	53.10	
Destiny	Hemi Te Wano	612	3.53		322	1.78	
NZ First					872	4.81	
National					648	3.58	
Green					572	3.16	
Legalise Cannabis					134	0.74	
United Future					100	0.55	
Progressive					38	0.21	
ACT					27	0.15	
Family Rights					12	0.07	
Christian Heritage					8	0.04	
99 MP					7	0.04	
Direct Democracy					7	0.04	
Alliance					6	0.03	
Libertarianz					3	0.02	
One NZ					1	0.01	
Democrats					0	0.00	
RONZ					0	0.00	
Informal votes		586			232		
Total valid votes		17,343			18,115		
Māori Party hold	Majority	5,113	29.48				

=== 2004 by-election ===
The following table shows the final results of the by-election:

2004 Te Tai Hauauru by-election
Notes: Blue background denotes the winner of the by-election. Pink background denotes a candidate elected from their party list prior to the by-election. Yellow background denotes the winner of the by-election, who was a list MP prior to the by-election. A ✓ or ✗ denotes status of any incumbent, win or lose respectively.
Party	Candidate	Votes	%	±%
Māori Party	✓ Tariana Turia	7,256	92.74	
Legalise Cannabis	Dun Mihaka	197	2.52	
Independent	Tahu Nepia	183	2.24	
Independent	Peter Wakeman	80	1.02	
Independent	David Bolton	70	0.89	
Independent	Rusty Kane	38	0.49	
Majority		7,059	24.9	
Turnout		7,861^{a}	27.85	
Māori Party gain from Labour		Swing		

^{a} Includes 37 informal votes but does not include any disallowed special votes.

=== 2002 election ===
2002 general election: Te Tai Hauauru
Notes:	Blue background denotes the winner of the electorate vote. Pink background denotes a candidate elected from their party list. Yellow background denotes an electorate win by a list member, or other incumbent. A ✓ or ✗ denotes status of any incumbent, win or lose respectively.						
Party	Candidate	Votes	%	±%	Party votes	%	±%
Labour	Tariana Turia	10,002	71.36		8,113	56.08	
Mana Māori	Ken Mair	1,345	9.60		590	4.08	
National	Greg White	991	7.07		596	4.12	
United Future	James Hippolite	705	5.03		377	2.61	
Alliance	Manuel Kamaka	594	4.24		290	2.00	
Christian Heritage	Jeannette Shramka	380	2.71		245	1.69	
NZ First					1,832	12.66	
Green					1,602	11.07	
Legalise Cannabis					454	3.14	
Progressive					165	1.14	
ACT					94	0.65	
ORNZ					92	0.64	
One NZ					13	0.09	
NMP					4	0.03	
Informal votes		421			136		
Total valid votes		14,017			14,467		
Labour hold	Majority	8,657	61.76				

=== 1999 election ===
1999 general election: Te Tai Hauāuru
Notes:	Blue background denotes the winner of the electorate vote. Pink background denotes a candidate elected from their party list. Yellow background denotes an electorate win by a list member, or other incumbent. A ✓ or ✗ denotes status of any incumbent, win or lose respectively.						
Party	Candidate	Votes	%	±%	Party votes	%	±%
Labour	Nanaia Mahuta	8,162	52.15		8,755	55.45	
NZ First	Lorraine Anderson	1,929	12.33		1,976	12.51	
Mauri Pacific	✗ Tuku Morgan	1,635	10.45		766	4.85	
Mana Māori	Ken Mair	1,407	8.99		966	6.12	
Alliance	Joe Puketapu	1,068	6.82		983	6.23	
National	Dennis Patuwairua	555	3.55		698	4.42	
Piri Wiri Tua	Dalvanius Prime	224	1.43				
Christian Democrats	Lee Edmonds	177	1.13		127	0.80	
Christian Heritage	Jeannette Shramka	165	1.05		138	0.87	
Freedom Movement	Lei Graham	138	0.88		52	0.33	
Mana Wahine	Antoine Brown	117	0.75				
People's Choice	Doug Wilson	74	0.47		11	0.07	
Green					654	4.14	
Legalise Cannabis					495	3.14	
ACT					106	0.67	
Animals First					16	0.10	
United NZ					9	0.06	
McGillicuddy Serious					7	0.04	
Natural Law					7	0.04	
One NZ					7	0.04	
NMP					5	0.03	
Republican					2	0.01	
South Island					1	0.01	
Informal votes		561			423		
Total valid votes		15,651			15,789		
Labour gain from NZ First	Majority	6,233	39.82				
