= Mayor of South Taranaki =

Head of a municipal government in New Zealand

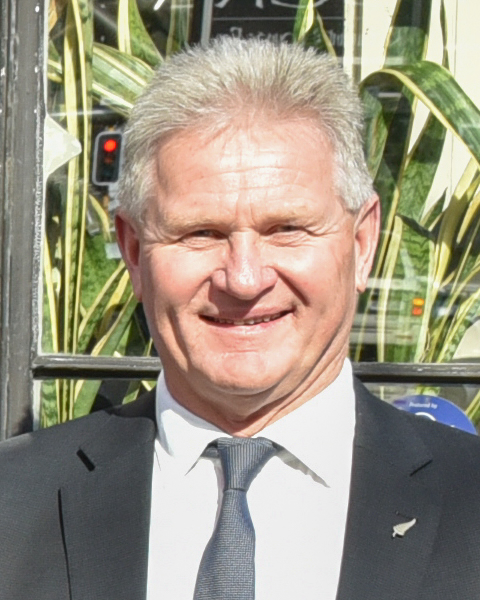
- Incumbent; Phil Nixon since 2019
- Style: His/Her Worship
- Term length: Three years, renewable
- Inaugural holder: Pierce Joyce
- Formation: 1989
- Deputy: Robert Northcott
- Salary: $139,953
- Website: Official website

The mayor of South Taranaki officiates over the South Taranaki District Council.

== History ==
The South Taranaki District was formed in the 1989 local government reforms. Pierce Joyce was the first mayor until he was beaten in the 1992 local elections by Mary Bourke. Bourke retired at the 2007 local elections and was replaced by Ross Dunlop. Phil Nixon is the current mayor of South Taranaki. He won the mayoral election by a large margin in October 2019 after Dunlop did not seek re-election.

== List of mayors of South Taranaki ==
South Taranaki has had four mayors:

	Name	Portrait	Term
1	Pierce Joyce		1989–1992
2	Mary Bourke		1992–2007
3	Ross Dunlop		2007–2019
4	Phil Nixon		2019–present

== List of deputy mayors ==
Name	Term	Mayor
Debbie Ngarewa-Packer	2007–2010	Dunlop
Alex Ballantyne	2010–2014	Dunlop
Ian Armstrong	2014–2016	Dunlop
Phil Nixon	2016–2019	Dunlop
Robert Northcott	2019–present	Nixon
