= Debbie Ngarewa-Packer =

New Zealand politician and Māori leader

Debbie Ngarewa-Packer MP
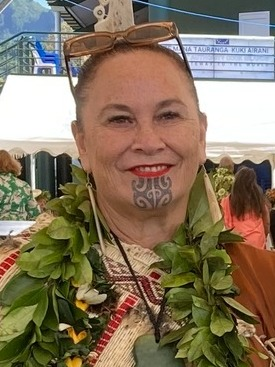
- Ngarewa-Packer in 2025

5th Co-leader of Te Pāti Māori
- Incumbent
- Assumed office 15 April 2020 Co-leader with John Tamihere (April–October 2020); Co-leader with Rawiri Waititi (October 2020 – present)
- Preceded by: Marama Fox

Member of Parliament for Te Tai Hauāuru
- Incumbent
- Assumed office 14 October 2023
- Preceded by: Adrian Rurawhe
- Majority: 9,162

Member of the New Zealand Parliament for Te Pāti Māori Party list
- In office 17 October 2020 – 14 October 2023

Personal details
- Born: 1966 or 1967 (age 58–59) South Taranaki, New Zealand
- Party: Te Pāti Māori (2020–present)
- Relations: Married
- Children: 3
- Occupation: Business consultant, business director

Debbie Anne Ngarewa-Packer is a New Zealand politician, iwi leader and activist. She is a Member of Parliament and co-leader of Te Pāti Māori alongside Rawiri Waititi, and is the chief executive of the Ngāti Ruanui iwi.

Ngarewa-Packer stood for Te Pāti Māori during the 2020 election in the seat of Te Tai Hauāuru. Ngarewa-Packer lost to Labour's Adrian Rurawhe however entered Parliament as a List MP. In 2023, she won the seat of Te Tai Hauāuru against Labour's Soraya Peke-Mason.

== Early life and education ==
Ngarewa-Packer grew up in Pātea and attended New Plymouth Girls' High School.

== Local government ==
Ngarewa-Packer is a former deputy mayor of South Taranaki. She was elected to the South Taranaki District Council in the 2007 local elections, representing the Pātea ward. She also contested the mayoral position, which was won by Ross Dunlop; after the elections Dunlop selected her as deputy mayor. She had that role until 2010, when she did not seek re-election.

== Ngāti Ruanui and local activism ==
Ngarewa-Packer is chief executive of the Ngāti Ruanui iwi. She has also been the kaiarataki of Te Rūnanga o Ngāti Ruanui, an organisation that runs healthcare centres in Hāwera and Pātea. She has advocated for Māori health and the environment at a grassroots level for many years. In 2004, she rallied more than 250 Taranaki people to join with the foreshore and seabed hīkoi on its way to Wellington.

Ngarewa-Packer campaigned against seabed mining off the Taranaki coast. The Environmental Protection Authority granted a marine discharge consent to mining company Trans-Tasman Resources (TTR) in 2017, but a later High Court decision cancelled these consents. In April 2020, the Court of Appeal found that EPA's 2017 decision was not consistent with the law to protect the environment from harmful substances. TTR appealed to the Supreme Court, to which Ngarewa-Packer said "We’re annoyed that we may have to go to court for a fourth time as right now our efforts are focused on protecting our community from COVID-19. But we are undeterred in our resolve and we will oppose TTR’s application for yet another appeal." The Supreme Court's final decision supported the earlier courts in cancelling the consents.

In 2011, she joined a 10-member independent panel set up by the Government to identify ways to raise the rate of return on Māori-owned assets, and grow Māori contribution to New Zealand's economy.

Regarding the COVID-19 response, The Spinoff described Ngarewa-Packer in 2020 as "a key voice in the COVID-19 iwi response, not only in analysing and mitigating risks in her own rohe, but in keeping applied pressure on local and central government to include Māori in their risk assessment."

== Parliamentary career ==
New Zealand Parliament
| Years | Term | Electorate | List | Party |
|---|---|---|---|---|
| 2020–2023 | 53rd | List | 1 | Te Pāti Māori |
| 2023–2026 | 54th | Te Tai Hauāuru | 1 | Te Pāti Māori |
| 2026–present | 55th | Te Tai Hauāuru | | Te Pāti Māori |

=== 2017 attempt ===
Debbie Ngarewa-Packer "put her hand up" to be the Māori Party's candidate for the Te Tai Hauāuru electorate for the 2017 election, saying she had been approached by party co-leader Tariana Turia and that she had "supported the Maori Party from day one". However, the party's candidate for this electorate was ultimately Howie Tamati.

=== 2020 election ===
Ngarewa-Packer was selected in October 2019 to be the Māori Party's candidate for the Te Tai Hauāuru electorate for the 2020 election – the first electoral candidate announced by the party for that election – and in April 2020 was elected unopposed to be co-leader of the Māori Party, along with John Tamihere. Ngarewa-Packer and Tamihere were the first party leaders elected since the Māori Party lost its parliament seats in the 2017 election, after which its previous leaders stepped down. Ngarewa-Packer had the party's number one list position for the election.

Ngarewa-Packer was generally considered to be the Māori Party's best chance at returning to Parliament; polls showed the party below the 5 per cent party vote threshold, so it would need to win at least one electorate seat to enter. A poll released in late September 2020 showed Labour's candidate for Te Tai Hauāuru, Adrian Rurawhe, as having greater support than Ngarewa-Packer, though there were a large number of undecided voters in the poll. In response to the poll, Ngarewa-Packer said she was buoyed by the number of undecided voters and called the electorate “winnable”. During the campaign, she stated a need for Māori-led approaches to problems faced by Māori such as worse health and housing, and that the Māori Party would hold the government to account.

At the 2020 election, Ngarewa-Packer was elected as a Member of Parliament. She came second in the Te Tai Hauāuru electorate, receiving 11,107 electorate votes to Rurawhe's 12,160, but fellow Te Pāti Māori co-leader Rawiri Waititi unseated Labour MP Tāmati Coffey in the Waiariki electorate. Waititi's electorate win meant that the Māori Party was entitled to enter Parliament and to bring additional MPs if its party vote was high enough. The initial count suggested the party had won 1.0% of the party vote – only enough for one seat – but the final count showed the party had received 1.2% and was entitled to a second seat. Since the Māori party constitution states that co-leaders must be first drawn from its parliamentary caucus, Waititi replaced Tamihere as Ngarewa-Packer's co-leader.

=== First term, 2020–2023 ===
==== Actions in Parliament ====
After the 2020 election, Ngarewa-Packer became the Māori Party's parliamentary whip, or Mataura. On 26 November 2020, Ngarewa-Packer and Waititi walked out of Parliament after the Speaker of the House Trevor Mallard declined Waititi's motion that the Māori Party be allowed to speak for 15 minutes because MPs from smaller parties were not scheduled to deliver their maiden speeches until the following week. Ngarewa-Packer criticised Mallard's decision as "another example of the Māori voice being silenced and ignored." Writing in December 2020, journalist Marc Daalder said, "Waititi and Ngarewa-Packer have already garnered a reputation for – depending on who you ask – rabble-rousing, troublemaking or standing up for their rights."

In a 2021 interview, Ngarewa-Packer said her goals included helping whānau access safe housing, along with achieving better incomes and health outcomes.

On 10 May 2023, Speaker Adrian Rurawhe ordered Ngarewara-Packer and Waititi to leave proceedings at the House of Representatives after welcoming former Labour MP Meka Whaitiri with a haka (dance) without seeking the permission of the Speaker or other parliamentary parties.

==== Seabed mining ====
Ngarewa-Packer submitted a member's bill in early 2021 which would ban seabed mining in New Zealand waters. This followed her eight-year work with her iwi campaigning against seabed mining near Pātea. The Green Party has supported the Bill. To be introduced to parliament, the bill would need the support of 61 non-Minister MPs or be drawn from a random ballot.

On 10 May 2023, Ngarewa-Packer's Prohibition on Seabed Mining Legislation Amendment Bill was defeated at its first reading by margin of 106 to 13 votes. While the Labour, National and ACT parties voted against the Bill, her bill was supported by the Māori and Green parties, and independent MPs Elizabeth Kerekere and Meka Whaitiri. During the debate, Ngarewa-Packer claimed that public opinion favoured a complete ban on seabed mining in New Zealand waters, citing 13,000 favourable submissions, a 40,000-strong petition, and opposition from Māori iwi (tribes) and hapū (sub-tribes), and Greenpeace Aotearoa New Zealand. She also criticised the Labour Government's lack of support for a complete ban on seabed mining in New Zealand.

==== Te ao Māori ====
Ngarewa-Packer has called for place names in Taranaki to be reverted to their original te reo Māori names, and the Māori Party presented a petition to parliament calling for New Zealand's official name to be Aotearoa. She said that "Our reo is the gateway to stopping racism."

==== COVID-19 ====
Ngarewa-Packer has called upon the Government to "get out of the way" and instead let Māori fix lagging COVID-19 vaccination rates. She and a team of volunteers spearheaded a mobile programme to lift COVID-19 vaccination rates in South Taranaki for "yaks and vax" sessions. These included door-to-door services, and were overseen by a registered nurse provided by Taranaki District Health Board. Ngarewa-Packer became trained in delivering vaccinations. The initiative followed low vaccination rates for Taranaki Māori; vaccination rates later rose for this population which Ngarewa-Packer attributed to Māori-led work, saying "We’ve borrowed the Māori Party campervan, and we’ve been hitting the streets doing it our way... There’s a lot of fear. They’re not anti-vax, just scared. And we have to respect that." At one event Niel Packer, Debbie Ngarewa-Packer's husband, was punched in the face by a man angry at the vaccination program.

In August 2021, she called for "serious consequences" for those breaking lockdown, saying that New Zealand "[does] not have the health capacity to deal with Delta".

Ngarewa-Packer condemned a plan to gradually ease lockdown restrictions in Auckland that was announced in October 2021. She noted at the time that only 56 percent of eligible Māori had received any COVID-19 vaccination compared to 79 percent of all eligible people in New Zealand, and said the plan showed “Māori were always expendable” and that "this was never a [vaccination] strategy designed to include tangata whenua".

==== Anti-racism ====
In 2021, Ngarewa-Packer criticised the National Party's "Demand The Debate" campaign, saying it fuelled racism. "They knew exactly what they were doing when they started this latest campaign,” she said, "I can tell you the day, the hour, the minute it went from being 18 threats a week to 30 to 40 a night. It was after National started criticising the Māori health authority, and then the He Puapua report.” She noted cases of harassment and death threats from far-right activists to Māori women, which had been escalating, and has called for a joint task force to investigate anti-Māori hate speech.

=== Second term, 2023–2026 ===
In the 2023 general election, Ngarewa-Packer again stood in Te Tai Hauāuru. She received 16,358 electorate votes, defeating the Labour candidate Soraya Peke-Mason by a margin of 9,162 votes. Overall, Te Pāti Māori captured six of the seven Māori electorates during the 2023 election.

In mid-December 2023, Ngarewa-Packer retained her position as Te Pāti Māori co-leader and joined Parliament's health select committee. She also assumed the party's health, climate change, environment, energy & resources, Takatāpui, digital economy, Accident Compensation Corporation, immigration, Pacific Peoples, human rights, and technology spokesperson portfolios.

==== Israel-Palestine ====
During the Gaza war, Ngarewa Packer defended Green Party MP Chlöe Swarbrick's controversial "From the river to the sea" statement and urged the care-taker Labour Government to call for an "end to war crimes." Te Pāti Māori also advocated the expulsion of the Israeli Ambassador Ran Yaakoby if Israel did not implement a ceasefire or open a humanitarian corridor in Gaza.

==== Tobacco policy ====
In opposition, Ngarewa-Packer disagreed with the National-led coalition government's repeal of the Smokefree Environments and Regulated Products (Smoked Tobacco) Amendment Act 2022. After Chief Ombudsman Judge Peter Boshier rebuked the Associate Health Minister Casey Costello withholding official Information Act requests for documents relating to the Government's tobacco policies, she called for a full inquiry into the Government's tobacco reform actions, alleging that Costello withheld information when pushing through the Smokefree repeal legislation under urgency.

==== Treaty Principles Bill ====
In mid November 2024, Ngarewa-Packer and her Te Pāti Māori colleagues opposed David Seymour's controversial Treaty Principles Bill, which proposed a constitutional overhaul of the principles of the Treaty of Waitangi. She along with Hana-Rawhiti Maipi-Clarke, Rawiri Waititi and Labour MP Peeni Henare performed an impromptu haka (Ka Mate) which disrupted the bill's first reading. On 10 December 2024, House Speaker Gerry Brownlee referred Ngarewa-Packer and her three colleagues to the Privileges Committee for disrupting parliamentary proceedings and for behaviour which could have the effect of "intimidation". Ngarewa-Packer was specifically named for moving towards the ACT party's seats and making a gesture that they described as firing a "finger gun". Te Pāti Māori defended their actions, accusing Parliament of a broader demonization of Māori.

On 1 April 2025, Ngarewa-Packer, Waititi and Maipi-Clarke declined to appear before the Privileges Committee, claiming they had been denied key legal rights such as a joint hearing, restrictions on their legal representation Christopher Finlayson, expert testimony from tikanga (Māori culture) expert Tā Pou Temara denied, hearing scheduling conflicts being ignored and concerns about disciplinary action against Maipi-Clarke. On 2 April, the Privileges Committee's chairperson Judith Collins confirmed that the privileges hearing would proceed regardless of whether the three TPM MPs turned up. In response, Ngarewa-Packer and Waititi announced that they would boycott the hearing and hold their own "alternative independent hearing," denouncing the Privileges Committee as a "kangaroo court."

On 14 May 2025, the Privileges Committee censured Ngarewa-Packer and her two colleagues for "acting in a manner that could have the effect of intimidating a member of the House in the discharge of their duty" during the haka protest. She and Waititi were suspended from Parliament for 21 days while Maipi-Clarke was suspended for a week. Te Pāti Māori issued a statement denouncing the verdict as "the worst punishment handed down ever in our history." On 20 May 2025, Parliament adopted Leader of the House Chris Bishop's motion that the parliamentary debate on the three MPs' suspension be delayed until 5 June, allowing them to participate in the budget debate on 22 May. On 5 June, parliament voted to suspend Maipi-Clarke for seven days, and Ngarewa-Packer and Waititi for 21 days.

A RNZ-Reid Research poll found that, a majority supported the punishment or thought it should be stronger. 37.0% said it was "about right"; 17.2% said it was "too lenient", and 36.2% said it was "too harsh".

==== Taxation ====
In early December 2024, Ngarewa-Packer advocated capital gains taxation, claiming that the Government could raise NZ$200 billion from such a tax over six years. She based her figures on remarks made by journalist Bernard Hickey during a debate with ACT leader David Seymour. Ngarewa-Packer's assertion was disputed by Finance Minister Nicola Willis, who likened them to Soviet economic policies, and Infometrics chief executive Brad Olsen, who described Ngarewa-Packer's figure as "absolutely daft."

==== Foreshore and seabed ====
Following the passage of the National Government's Marine and Coastal Area (Takutai Moana) (Customary Marine Title) Amendment Act 2025 (MACA) into law on 21 October 2025, Ngarewa-Packer and fellow Te Pāti Māori MP Tākuta Ferris posted a social media video of themselves burning a copy of the legislation on the grounds of Parliament. The MACA legislation raises the threshold for Māori making claims to ancestral titles on foreshore and seabed. In response, Speaker of the House Gerry Brownlee rebuked the two MPs and said he was "currently taking advice". Ngarewa-Packer defended her actions by accusing the Speaker of holding Te Pāti Māori to a higher standard than he did other parties including ACT leader David Seymour, who had driven a Land Rover up the steps of Parliament in February 2025.

==== 2026 general election ====
During the 2026 New Zealand general election, Ngarewa-Packer contested the Te Tai Hauāuru electorate as a Te Pāti Māori candidate. In mid-September 2026, one of her election hoardings was vandalised with a racial slur. Ngarewa-Packer condemned the vandalism and urged supporters to enroll and vote out the National-led coalition government. In late September 2026, Ngarewa-Packer temporarily withdrew from her election campaign due to her mother's ill health. On 21 October, she confirmed the death of her mother. Her campaign team subsequently confirmed that she would withdraw from upcoming debates to spend time with her whanau.

On 7 November, Ngarewa-Packer was re-elected to the Te Tai Hauāra electorate for a third consecutive time. Based on preliminary results, she defeated Labour candidate Te Pūoho Kātene by a margin of 3,841 votes.

== Personal life ==
Ngarewa-Packer affiliates with the Ngāti Ruahine, Ngāruahine, and Ngā Rauru iwi. She is a descendant of Tutange Waionui of Ngāti Ruanui, who fought alongside Tītokowaru during the New Zealand Wars and claimed credit for killing the mercenary, Gustavus von Tempsky. She also has Irish ancestry through her mother Colleen Ngarewa. Her mother died on 21 October 2026.

Ngarewa-Packer was a nominee for the Taranaki Daily News person of the year in 2018.

In mid-December 2024, Ngarewa-Packer was allegedly verbally abused and intimidated by a middle-aged European (Pākehā) man while visiting a Whanganui petrol station. In response, Te Pāti Māori denounced the incident as a "hate crime," filed a Police complaint and sought extra security and protection for its MPs from the Speaker of the New Zealand House of Representatives and Parliamentary Services.

Ngarewa-Packer is married to Neil Packer. In mid February 2025, Ngarewa-Packer visited the Cook Islands for her 30th wedding anniversary. On 17 February, she attended a protest against Cook Islands Prime Minister Mark Brown's recent strategic partnership with China and abortive Cook Islands passport proposal, which were seen as damaging Cook Islands–New Zealand relations. Ngarewa-Packer expressed agreement with New Zealand Prime Minister Christopher Luxon and Foreign Minister Winston Peters about the Cook Islands government's lack of consultation on the controversial partnership agreement.

On 20 October 2025, The New Zealand Herald reported that Ngarewa-Packer had failed to declare two properties under the New Zealand Parliament's transparency rules. In response, she stated that she would update Parliament's register of financial interests about her assets but also alleged that she was being targeted by the media because of her Māori ethnicity.

New Zealand Parliament
| Preceded by Adrian Rurawhe | Member of Parliament for Te Tai Hauāuru; 2023–present | Incumbent |
Party political offices
| Vacant Title last held by Marama Fox | Co-leader of the Māori Party; 2020–present Served alongside: John Tamihere, Rawiri Waititi | Incumbent |
