= South Taranaki District =

- Territorial authority district
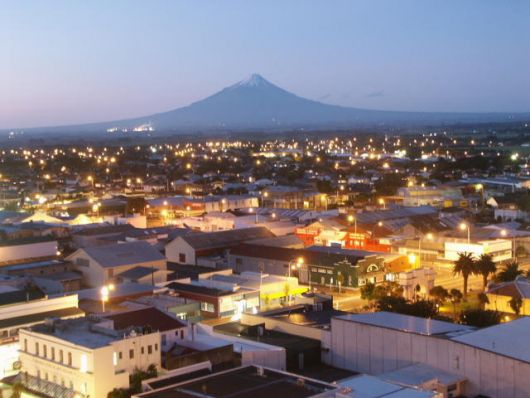
- Hāwera

- South Taranaki district within the North Island
- Coordinates: 39°29′35″S 174°26′49″E
- Country: New Zealand
- Region: Taranaki
- Wards: Taranaki Coastal; Eltham-Kaponga; Te Hāwera; Pātea; Te Kūrae (Māori); Te Tai Tonga (Māori)

Government
  - Mayor: Phil Nixon
  - Territorial authority: South Taranaki District Council

Area
  - Land: 3,575.08 km^{2} (1,380.35 sq mi)

Population (June 2025)
  - Total: 29,800
  - Density: 8.34/km^{2} (21.6/sq mi)
- Time zone: UTC+12 (NZST)
  - Summer (DST): UTC+13 (NZDT)
- Postcode(s): Map of postcodes

South Taranaki is a territorial authority on the west coast of New Zealand's North Island that contains the towns of Hāwera (the seat of the district), Manaia, Ōpunake, Pātea, Eltham, and Waverley. The District has a land area of 3,575.46 km^{2} (1,380.49 sq mi) and a population of 29,800 (June 2025). It is part of the greater Taranaki Region.

The district straddles the boundary separating the Wellington and Taranaki provinces, resulting in the town of Waverley celebrating Wellington Anniversary Day in January, and the town of Pātea 15 kilometres away celebrating Taranaki Anniversary Day in March.

Council facilities include the South Taranaki LibraryPlus which includes libraries in Manaia, Kaponga, Pātea, Eltham, Opunake, Hāwera and Waverley.

== History ==
The South Taranaki District was established as part of the 1989 local government reforms, merging Egmont, Eltham, Hawera, Pātea and Waimate West counties.

== Demographics ==
South Taranaki District covers 3,575.08 km^{2} (1,380.35 sq mi) and had an estimated population of 29,800 as of June 2025, with a population density of 8.3 people per km^{2}.

Historical population
Year	Pop.	±% p.a.
2006	26,487	—
2013	26,580	+0.05%
2018	27,534	+0.71%
2023	29,025	+1.06%

South Taranaki District had a population of 29,025 in the 2023 New Zealand census, an increase of 1,491 people (5.4%) since the 2018 census, and an increase of 2,445 people (9.2%) since the 2013 census. There were 14,655 males, 14,262 females and 105 people of other genders in 11,202 dwellings. 2.4% of people identified as LGBTIQ+. The median age was 39.6 years (compared with 38.1 years nationally). There were 6,171 people (21.3%) aged under 15 years, 4,830 (16.6%) aged 15 to 29, 12,906 (44.5%) aged 30 to 64, and 5,115 (17.6%) aged 65 or older.

People could identify as more than one ethnicity. The results were 80.2% European (Pākehā); 29.3% Māori; 3.0% Pasifika; 4.0% Asian; 0.4% Middle Eastern, Latin American and African New Zealanders (MELAA); and 2.6% other, which includes people giving their ethnicity as "New Zealander". English was spoken by 97.5%, Māori language by 6.6%, Samoan by 0.5% and other languages by 4.2%. No language could be spoken by 1.9% (e.g. too young to talk). New Zealand Sign Language was known by 0.6%. The percentage of people born overseas was 10.1, compared with 28.8% nationally.

Religious affiliations were 30.7% Christian, 0.6% Hindu, 0.4% Islam, 1.8% Māori religious beliefs, 0.3% Buddhist, 0.5% New Age, and 0.9% other religions. People who answered that they had no religion were 56.1%, and 9.1% of people did not answer the census question.

Of those at least 15 years old, 1,830 (8.0%) people had a bachelor's or higher degree, 13,113 (57.4%) had a post-high school certificate or diploma, and 7,359 (32.2%) people exclusively held high school qualifications. The median income was $36,700, compared with $41,500 nationally. 1,746 people (7.6%) earned over $100,000 compared to 12.1% nationally. The employment status of those at least 15 was that 11,160 (48.8%) people were employed full-time, 2,958 (12.9%) were part-time, and 717 (3.1%) were unemployed.

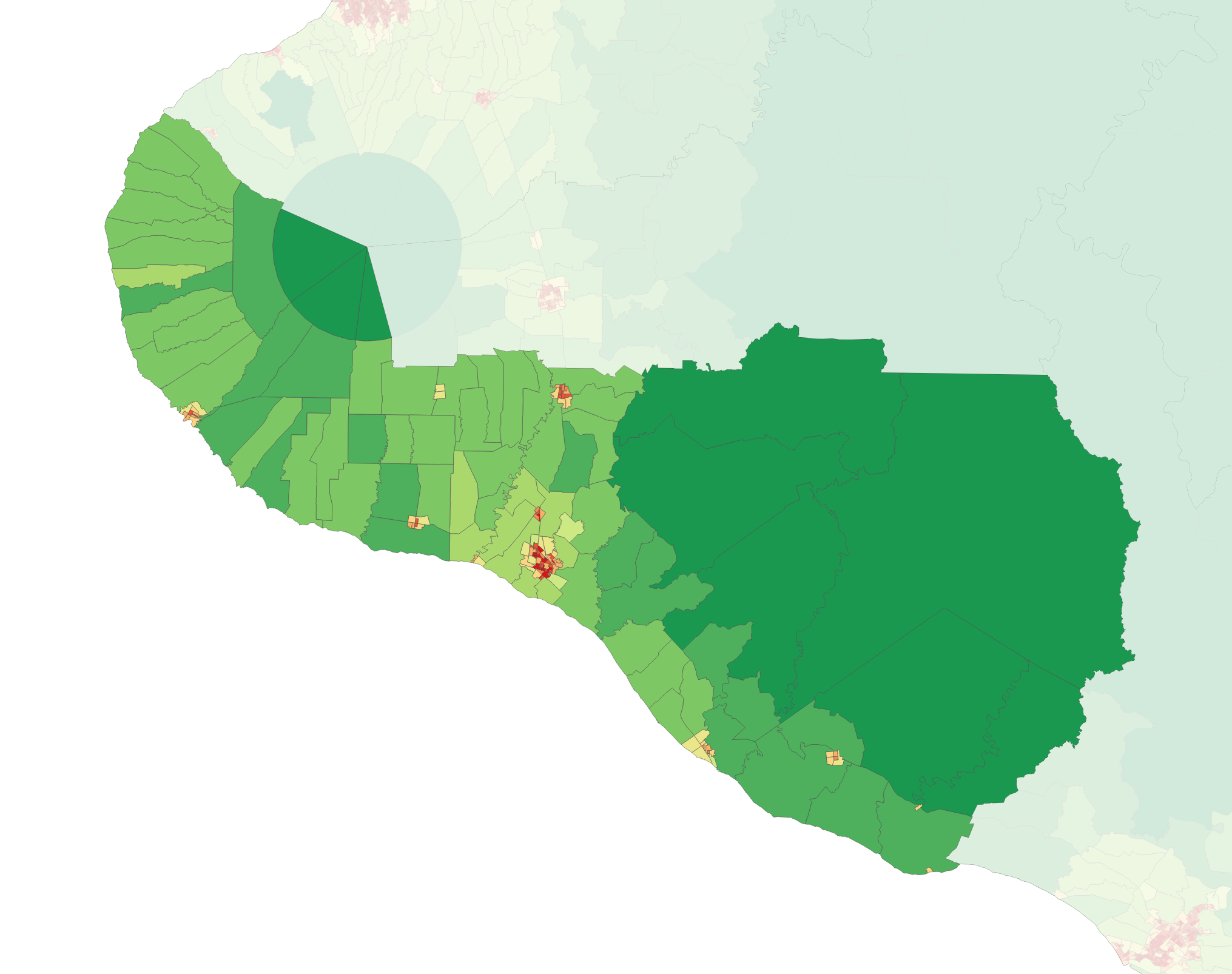
Population density in the 2023 census

Individual wards
Name	Area (km^{2})	Population	Density (per km^{2})	Dwellings	Median age	Median income
Taranaki Coastal General Ward	805.54	6,387	7.9	2,421	38.2 years	$37,100
Eltham-Kaponga General Ward	620.48	4,782	7.7	1,806	38.3 years	$38,600
Te Hāwera General Ward	481.06	13,821	28.7	5,247	39.8 years	$37,600
Pātea General Ward	1,668.00	4,035	2.4	1,728	43.9 years	$31,800
New Zealand					38.1 years	$41,500

== Government ==
The current mayor is Phil Nixon. Since 1989, South Taranaki has had four mayors:

	Name	Term of office
1	Pierce Joyce	1989–1992
2	Mary Bourke	1992–2007
3	Ross Dunlop	2007–2019
4	Phil Nixon	2019–present

== Economy ==
The South Taranaki District has a modelled gross domestic product (GDP) of $2,861 million in the year to March 2024, 0.6% of New Zealand's national GDP. The GDP per capita is $96,867, the second-highest of all territorial authorities (only behind Wellington City). Major industries in the district include dairy farming, meat and meat product manufacturing, dairy product manufacturing, and oil and gas extraction.
