= Huria =

Huria may refer to:

- Huria Redoubt, a fort in New Zealand
- Ramani Huria, a community based mapping project in Dar Es Salaam, Tanzania

Notable people with the first name or surname Huria or Hūria include:

- Huria Mashhour (born 1954), Yemeni human rights and women's rights activist
- Hūria Mātenga (c. 1842–1909), New Zealand tribal leader
- Gabrielle Huria, New Zealand Māori leader
- Jane Huria, New Zealand company director
