= Ruahine (disambiguation) =

The Ruahine is a mountain range in the North Island of New Zealand.

Ruahine may also refer to:

- Ruahine (New Zealand electorate), a former New Zealand parliamentary electorate
- Ruahine Albert, a New Zealand anti-domestic violence activist
- MS Ruahine, a passenger ship built in 1950
- SS Ruahine (1891), a steamship built in 1891
- SS Ruahine, a passenger ship built in 1909
- Ruahine Fault, a geological fault in the North Island Fault System, New Zealand

== See also ==
- Ngāruahine, a Māori iwi located in South Taranaki, North Island, New Zealand
