= Shane Cotton =

New Zealand artist

Shane Cotton ONZM
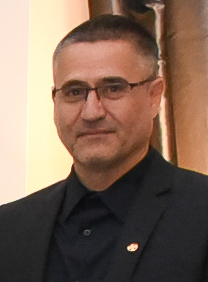
- Cotton in 2019
- Born: Shane William Cotton; 3 October 1965 (age 61); Upper Hutt, New Zealand
- Education: Ilam School of Fine Arts
- Occupation: Artist

Shane William Cotton ONZM (born 3 October 1964) is a New Zealand painter whose work explores biculturalism, colonialism, cultural identity, Māori spirituality, and life and death. He is a registered Toi Iho artist.

== Life ==
Cotton was born in Upper Hutt with Ngāpuhi, Ngāti Rangi, Ngāti Hine and Te Uri Taniwha iwi affiliations (his father a member of the Ngāpuhi iwi and his mother European). His home marae is at Ngāwhā, near Kaikohe. Cotton studied at the Ilam School of Fine Arts in Christchurch, graduating in 1988. He met his wife, Luanne, who is an architect, at art school. Cotton went on to gain a Diploma of Education from Christchurch College of Education and worked as a teacher. He lectured at Massey University, Palmerston North, in the Māori visual arts programme from 1993 until 2005 when he left to concentrate on his art practice full-time.

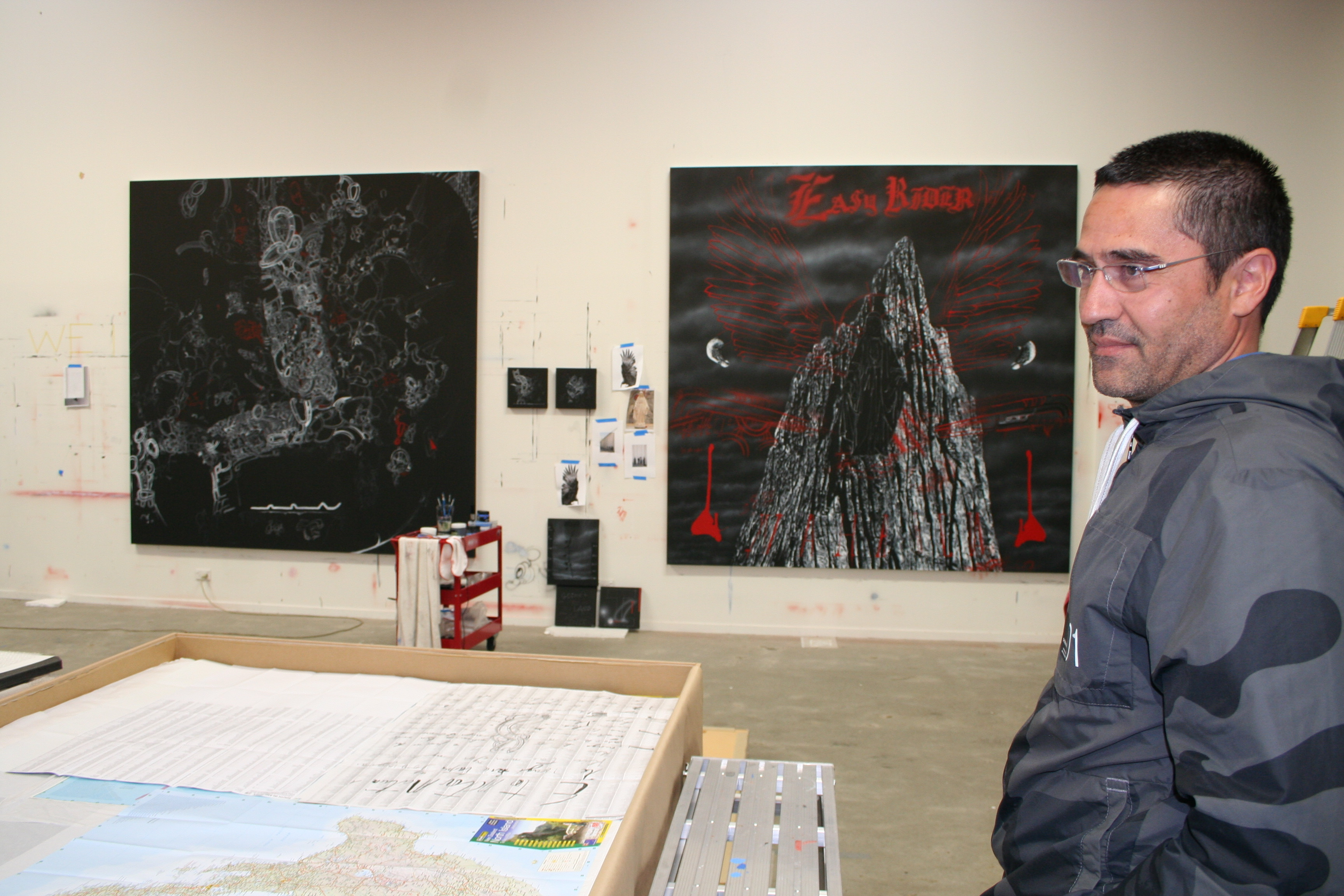
Shane Cotton in his Palmerston North studio, 2011

Cotton's early works, in the late 1980s and early 1990s, were abstract paintings depicting biomorphic forms. While doing research for his job at Massey University, he learned of Māori folk art, such as the painted decorations that combined Māori and Pākehā (European) motifs in meeting houses associated with Te Kooti, the 19th-century religious leader. In 1993 he started painting sepia-toned works that took inspiration from those in the late 19th-century buildings, such as the Rongopai meeting house at Waituhi, near Gisborne. In these he explored "colonial and post-colonial" "Māori and Pākehā cultural histories". Works from this period include a 17-metre-tall painting that was commissioned for SkyCity Auckland, which opened in 1996; the painting is now in SkyCity's International Convention Centre, which opened in 2026.

Cotton received both the Frances Hodgkins Fellowship and the Seppelt Contemporary Art Award from the Sydney Museum of Contemporary Art in 1998. His work was translated into a stained glass installation in St Joseph's Church, in Mt Victoria, Wellington, which opened in 2004. He was the New Zealand representative in the 2005 Prague Biennale. By 2007 he had been exhibited at many leading galleries in Australia and New Zealand, as well as in Spain. His work was included in the 17th Biennale of Sydney 2010. In 2015 Cotton was commissioned by the Australian War Memorial to make a print to commemorate the ANZAC Centenary.

Needlework by Shane Cotton, 1993

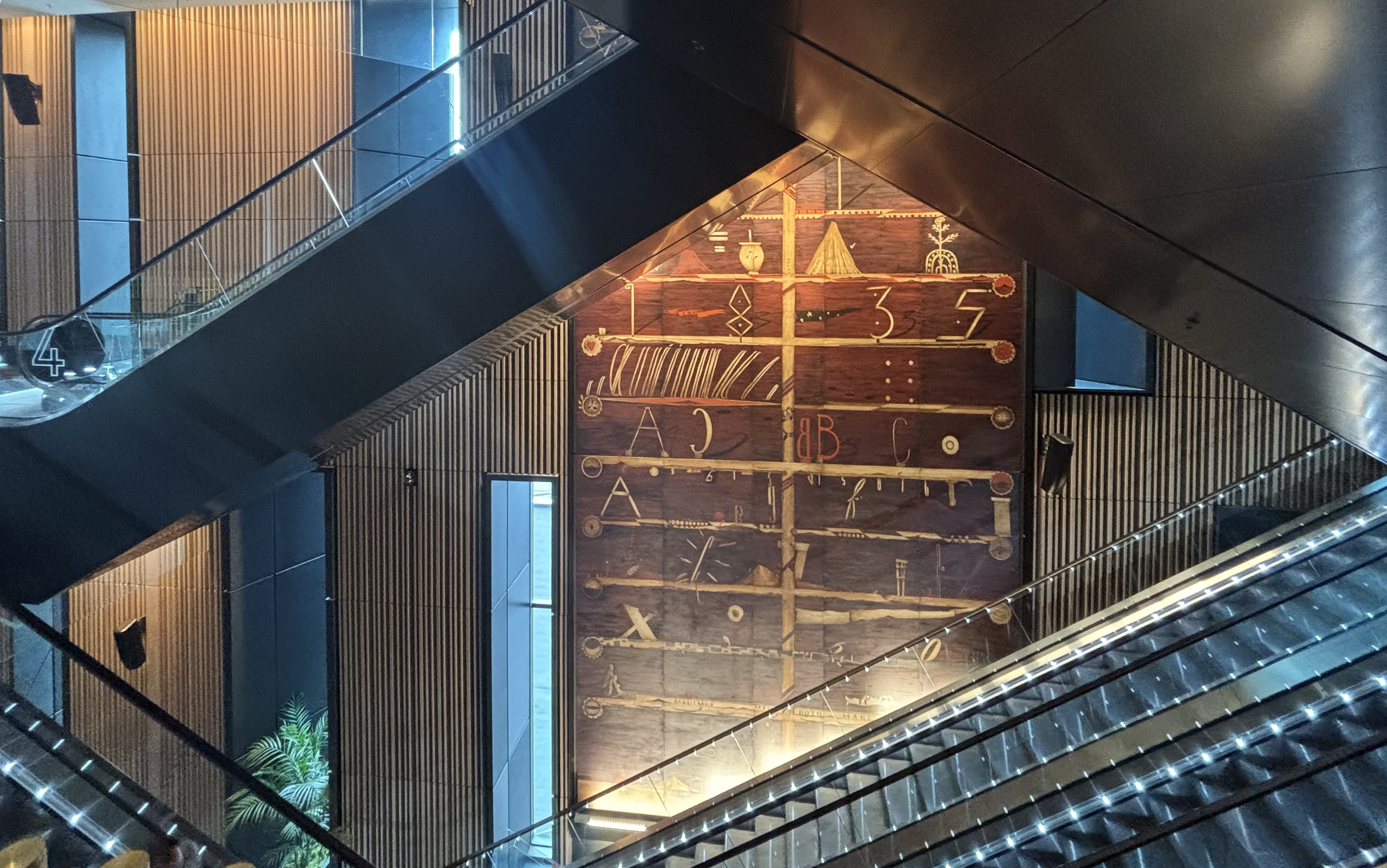
Cotton's 17-metre-tall painting in the New Zealand International Convention Centre

Cotton's work includes Māori iconography and culture, such as shrunken heads, mokomokai, and native birds such as tūī, and European symbols and items. His paintings have explored questions of colonialism, cultural identity, Māori spirituality, and life and death. Describing his practice, Cotton said in 2012, "Biculturalism, how our histories have been interwoven over time, things that have come out of that connection – culture, politics, societal living – have been the driving factors in my work."

In 2008, he received a Laureate Award from the New Zealand Arts Foundation. He was appointed an Officer of the New Zealand Order of Merit, for services to the visual arts, in the 2012 Queen's Birthday and Diamond Jubilee Honours.

== Awards ==
- 1986 Bickerton-Widdowson Memorial Scholarship
- 1989 Wilkins and Davies Young Artist of the Year
- 1991 Te Waka Toi Projects Grant
- 1998 Ethel Rose Overton Scholarship; Sawtell-Turner Prize in Painting; Irwin Allen Hunt Scholarship; Frances Hodgkins Fellowship University of Otago, Dunedin; Seppelt Contemporary Art Award for visual arts, Museum of contemporary Art, Sydney.
- 1999 Te Tohu Mahi Hou a Te Waka Toi/Te Waka Toi Award for New Work
- 2008 Arts Foundation of New Zealand Laureate Award
- 2012 Officer of the New Zealand Order of Merit, for services to the visual arts, in the 2012 Queen's Birthday and Diamond Jubilee Honours

== Selected solo exhibitions ==
1990

- Nature Forms Myth, Last Decade Gallery, Wellington

1992

- Strata, Brooke Gifford Gallery, Christchurch

1993

- Collections: New Work by Shane Cotton, Hamish McKay Gallery, Wellington

1994

- New Works, Claybrook Gallery, Auckland
- New Painting, Hamish McKay Gallery, Wellington

1995

- Shane Cotton: Recent Paintings, Govett-Brewster Art Gallery, New Plymouth
- Te Ta Pahara, Brooke Gifford Gallery, Christchurch.
- Shane Cotton: Recent Paintings, Darren Knight Gallery, Melbourne
- Ta Te Whenua, Manawatu Art Gallery Palmerston North

1996

- New Painting, Anna Bibby Gallery, Auckland
- New Painting, Hamish McKay Gallery, Wellington

1997

- New Painting, Brooke Gifford Gallery, Christchurch
- Square Style, Mori Gallery, Sydney

1998

- Local, Hamish McKay Gallery, Wellington
- Shane Cotton, Gow Langsford Gallery, Auckland

1999

- New Painting, Brooke Gifford Gallery, Christchurch
- Shane Cotton, Hocken Library Gallery, University of Otago, Dunedin
- New Paintings, Hamish McKay Gallery, Wellington. Also shown at the Mori Gallery, Sydney and Gow Langsford Gallery, Auckland

2000

- Te Timatanga: From Eden to Ohaeawai, Dunedin Public Art Gallery Curated by Justin Paton.

2001

- Blackout Movement, Gow Langsford Gallery, Auckland
- New Paintings, Brooke Gifford Gallery, Christchurch

2002

- Powder Garden, Hamish McKay Gallery, Wellington
- Birds Eyes Views, Mori Gallery, Sydney

2003

- Shane Cotton Survey 1993–2003, City Gallery Wellington
- Shane Cotton: Recent Painting, Gow Langsford Gallery, Auckland
- Shane Cotton: Paintings, SOFA Gallery, School of Fine Arts, University of Canterbury, Christchurch
- Shane Cotton: New Paintings, Brooke-Gifford Gallery, Christchurch

2004

- Shane Cotton Auckland Art Gallery Toi o Tamaki. Curated by Robert Leonard the exhibition was based on the City Gallery Wellington survey exhibition Shane Cotton Survey 1993–2003

2005

- Pararaiha, Sherman Galleries, Sydney
- New Zealand representative in the Prague Biennale

2006

- Shane Cotton, Hamish McKay Gallery, Wellington
- Shane Cotton, Gow Langsford Gallery, Auckland

2007

- Shane Cotton, Sherman Galleries, Sydney
- Red-Shift, Sherman Galleries, Sydney
- Helgoland, Brooke Gifford Gallery, Christchurch

2008

- Coloured Dirt, Hamish McKay Gallery, Wellington

2010

- Smashed Myth, Anna Schwartz Gallery, Sydney
- New Work, Michael Lett Gallery, Auckland
- To and Fro Rossi & Rossi Gallery, London

2011

- Supersymmetry, Michael Lett Gallery, Auckland

2012

- Shane Cotton: the Hanging Sky, IMA Brisbane. Curated by Justin Paton the exhibition was developed by the Christchurch Art Gallery Te Puna o Waiwhetū in association with the Institute of Modern Art, Brisbane. The exhibition was shown at the IMA, Brisbane, the Campbelltown Arts Centre, NSW and City Gallery Wellington.
- Smoking Gun, Anna Schwartz Gallery, Melbourne

2014

- Baseland Christchurch City Gallery & Ilam Campus Gallery, Christchurch
- The Voyage Out, Rossi & Rossi Gallery, Hong Kong
