= 2012 Birthday Honours (New Zealand) =

Awards list for New Zealand

2012 Queen's Birthday and Diamond Jubilee Honours
- Previous: 2012 New Year Honours; Next: 2013 New Year Honours
- Type: New Zealand royal honours: Order of New Zealand; New Zealand Order of Merit; Queen's Service Order; Queen's Service Medal; Distinguished Service Decoration
- Date: 4 June 2012
- Country: New Zealand

Highlights
- Total recipients: 185

The 2012 Queen's Birthday and Diamond Jubilee Honours in New Zealand, celebrating the official birthday and diamond jubilee of Queen Elizabeth II, were appointments made by the Queen in her right as Queen of New Zealand, on the advice of the New Zealand government, to various orders and honours to reward and highlight good works by New Zealanders. They were announced on 4 June 2012.

The honours recipients are listed here as they were styled before their new honour.

== Order of New Zealand ==
Additional member

- His Royal Highness The Prince Philip Duke of Edinburgh KG KT OM GBE AC QSO PC – of London, United Kingdom. For services to New Zealand.
- Dame Margaret Clara Bazley DNZM – of Wellington. For services to New Zealand.
- Sir Peter Robert Jackson KNZM – of Wellington. For services to New Zealand.
- Dame Malvina Lorraine Major GNZM DBE – of Hamilton. For services to New Zealand.
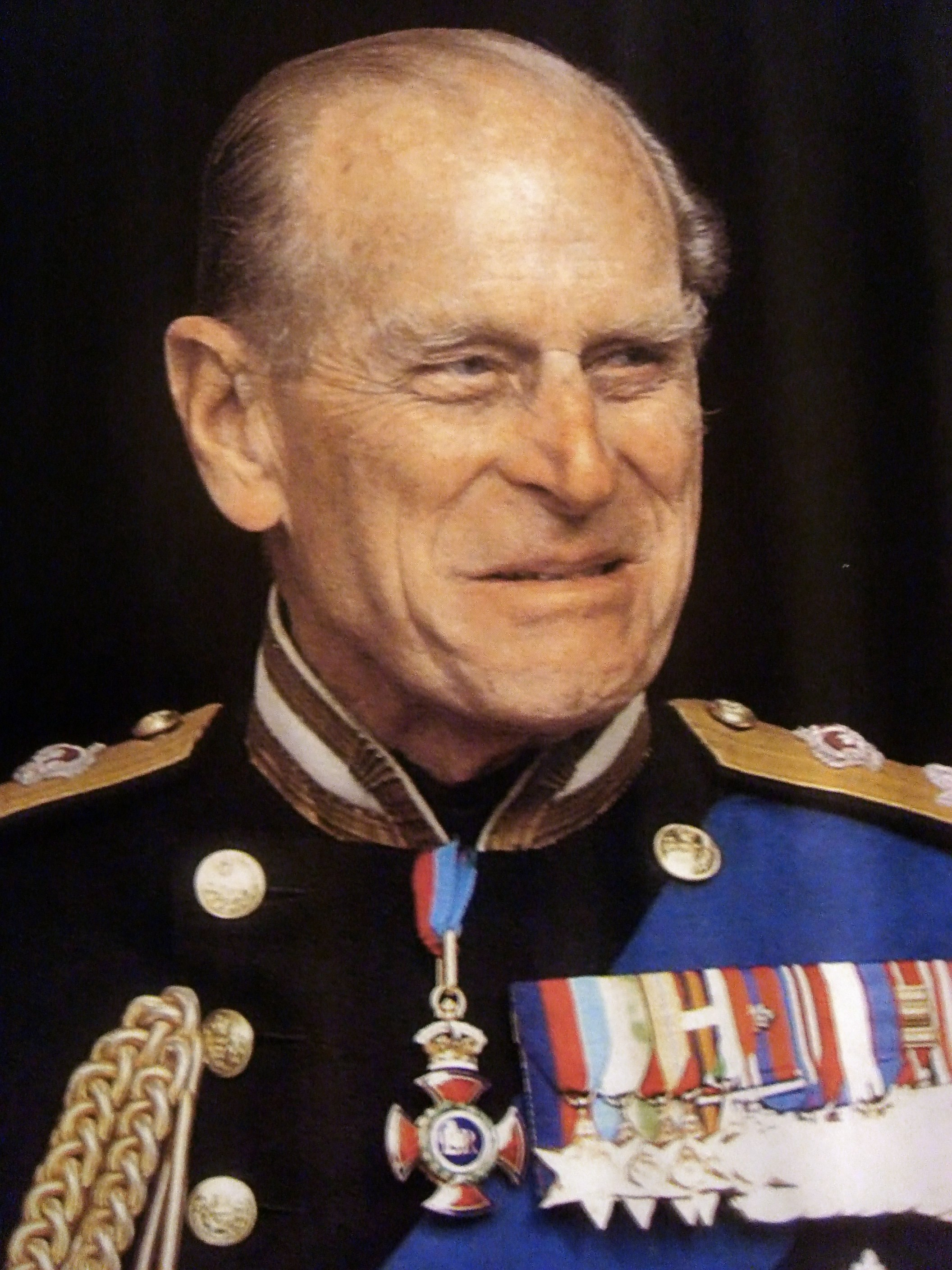
Prince Philip

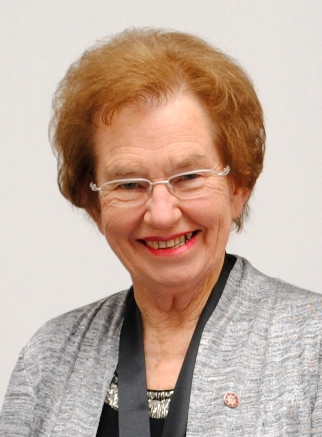
Dame Margaret Bazley

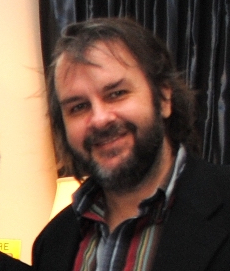
Sir Peter Jackson

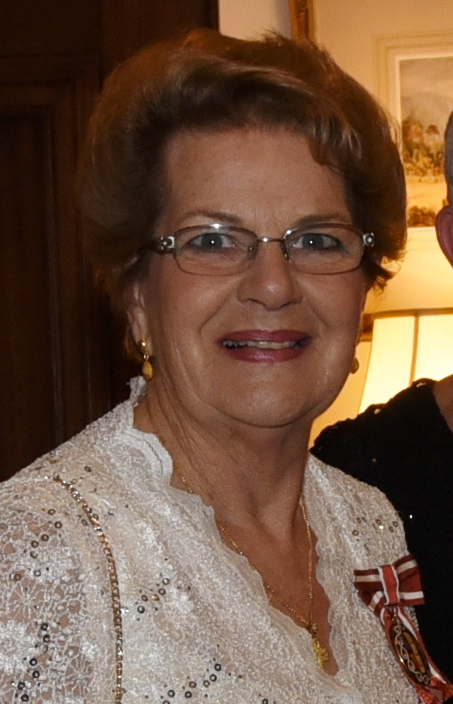
Dame Malvina Major

== New Zealand Order of Merit ==
=== Dame Companion (DNZM) ===
- Mabel June Hinekahukura Mariu CNZM QSM JP – of Waitakere City. For services to Māori and the community.
- Pieter Ane Stewart – of Darfield. For services to fashion and the community.
- Beverley Anne Wakem CBE – of Porirua. For services to the State.
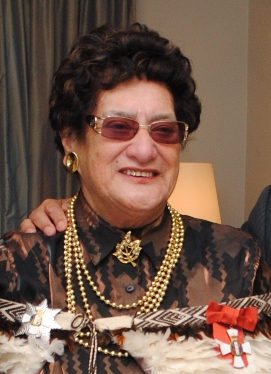
Dame June Mariu

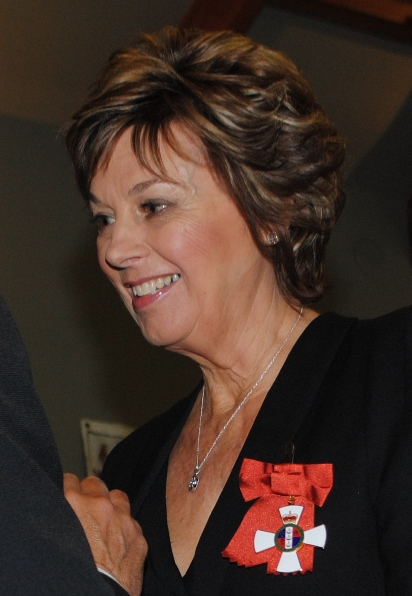
Dame Pieter Stewart

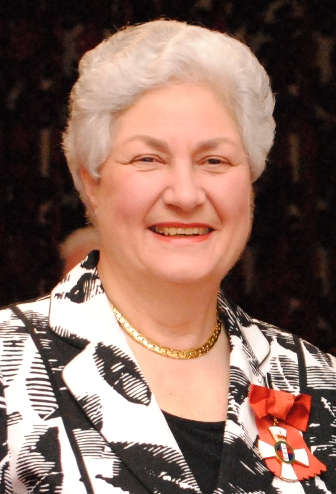
Dame Beverley Wakem

=== Knight Companion (KNZM) ===
- The Honourable Dr Michael John Cullen – of Whakatāne. For services to the State.
- Dr Roderick Sheldon Deane – of Wellington. For services to business and the community.
- John James Patrick Kirwan ONZM MBE – of Treviso, Italy. For services to mental health and rugby.
- Maarten Laurens Wevers CNZM – of Wellington. For services to the State.
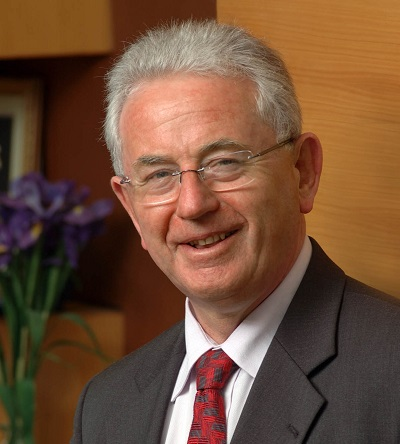
Sir Michael Cullen

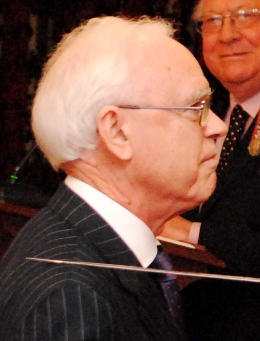
Sir Roderick Deane

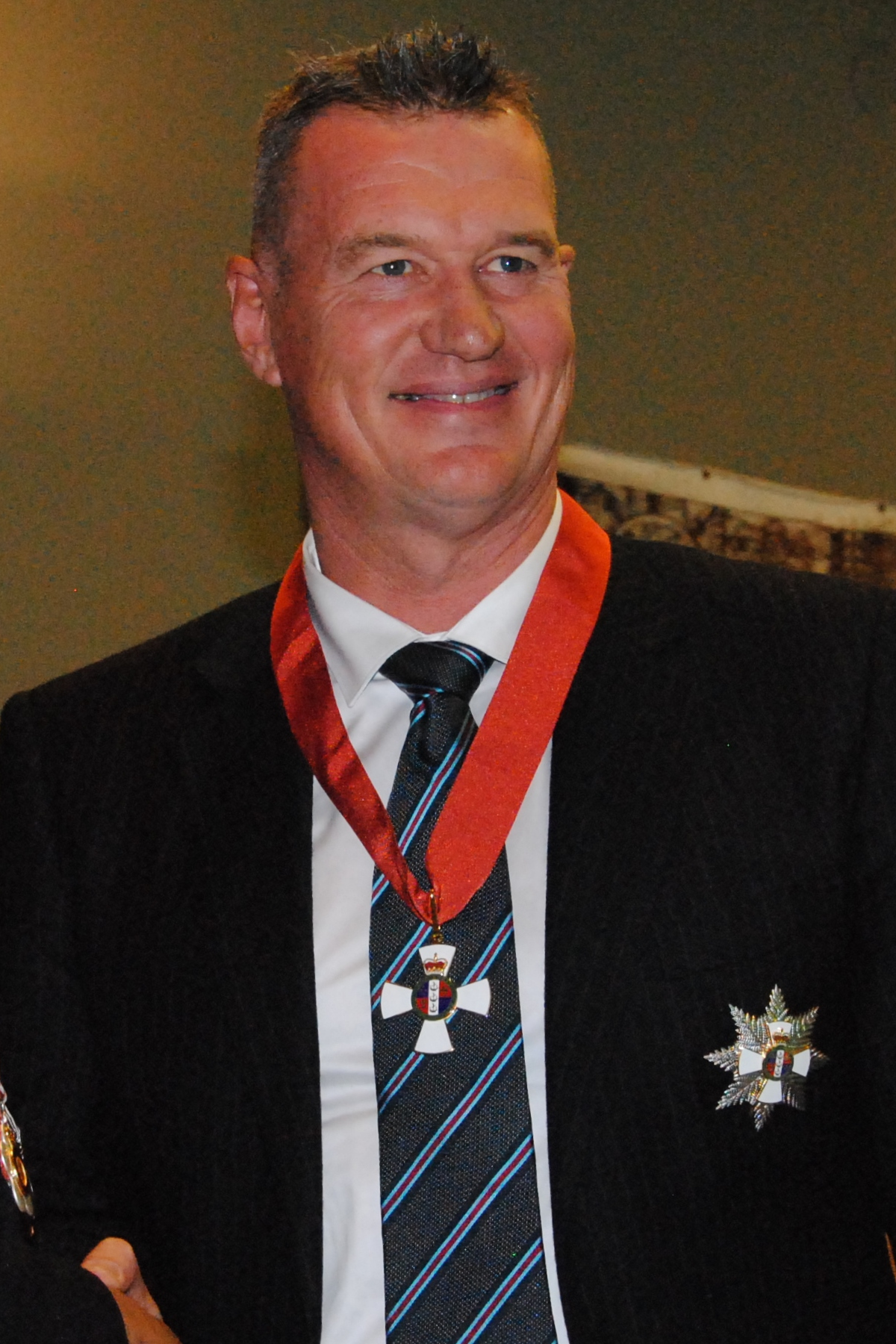
Sir John Kirwan

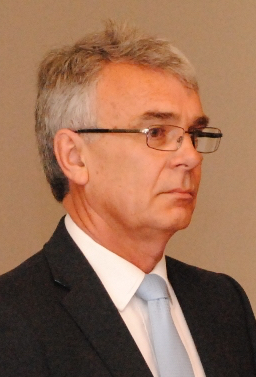
Sir Maarten Wevers

=== Companion (CNZM) ===
- Neville Alexander Crichton – of Auckland. For services to yachting and business.
- The Honourable Justice John Warwick Gendall – of Wellington. For services to the State and sport.
- Stephen William Hansen – of Christchurch. For services to rugby.
- Michael James Houstoun – of Feilding. For services as a pianist.
- Jane Christine Huria – of Christchurch. For services to corporate governance.
- Owen Marshall Jones ONZM – of Timaru. For services to literature.
- Anne Norman – of Auckland. For services to business.
- David Norman – of Auckland. For services to business.
- His Excellency Paul Thomas O'Sullivan AO – of Canberra, Australia. For services to Australia–New Zealand relations.
- Christopher William Saines – of Auckland. For services to the arts.
- John Shewan – of Wellington. For services to business.
- Professor Peter Donald Graham Skegg – of Dunedin. For services to medical law.
- Wayne Ross Smith – of Cambridge. For services to rugby.
- John Lewis Spencer – of Wellington. For services to business.
- Professor Christine Winterbourn – of Christchurch. For services to science.
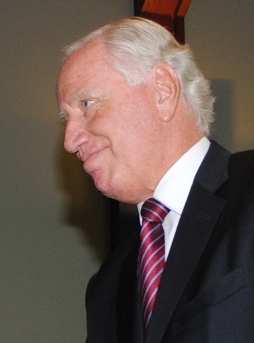
Neville Crichton

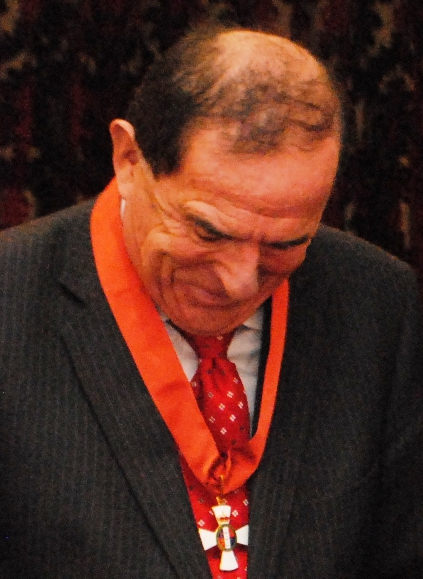
Warwick Gendall

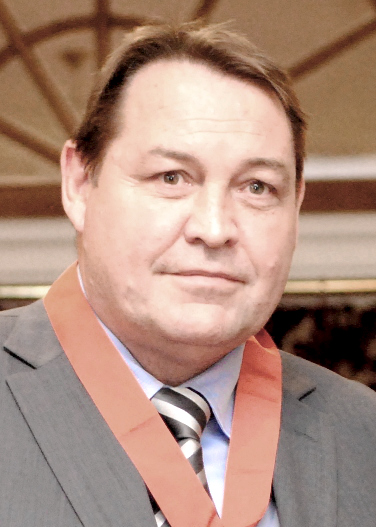
Steve Hansen

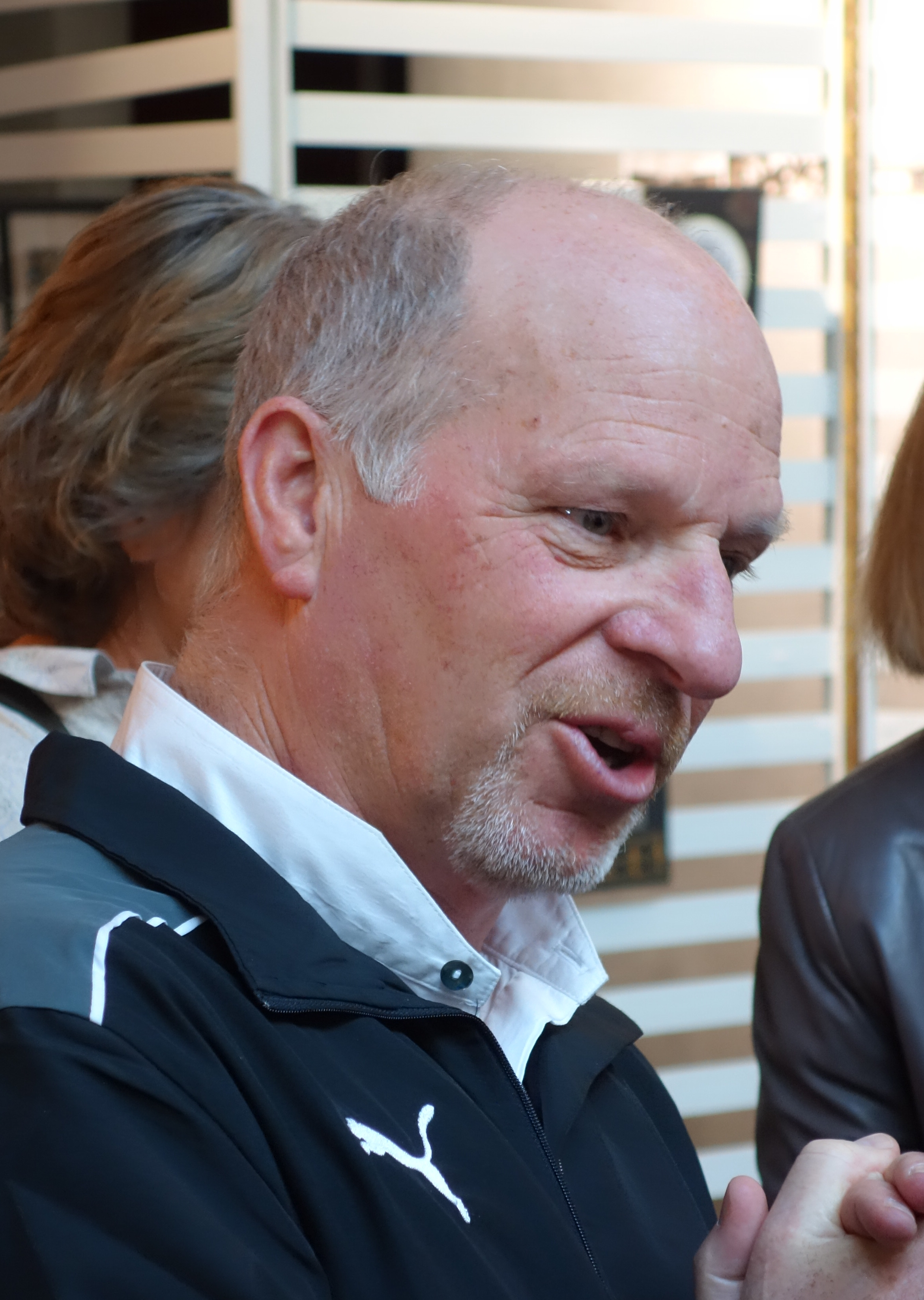
Michael Houstoun

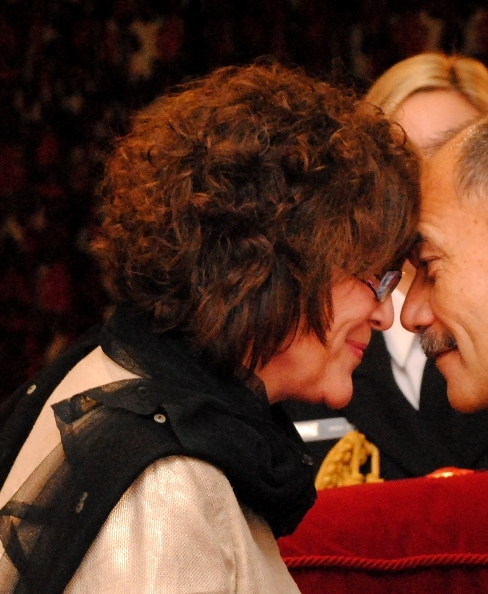
Jane Huria

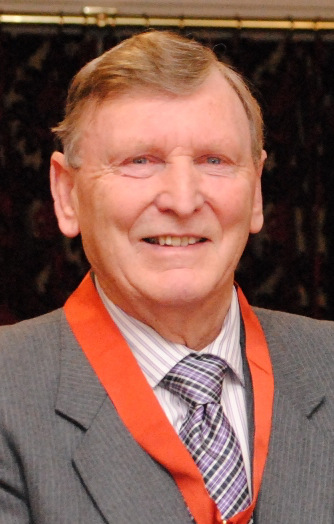
Owen Marshall

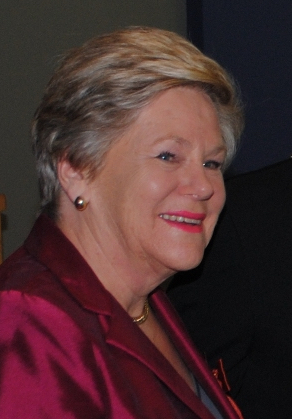
Anne Norman

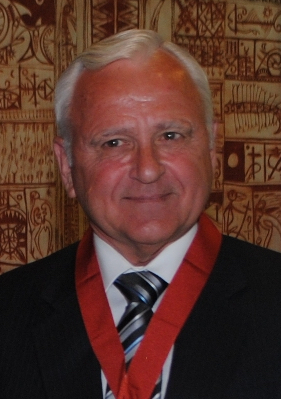
David Norman

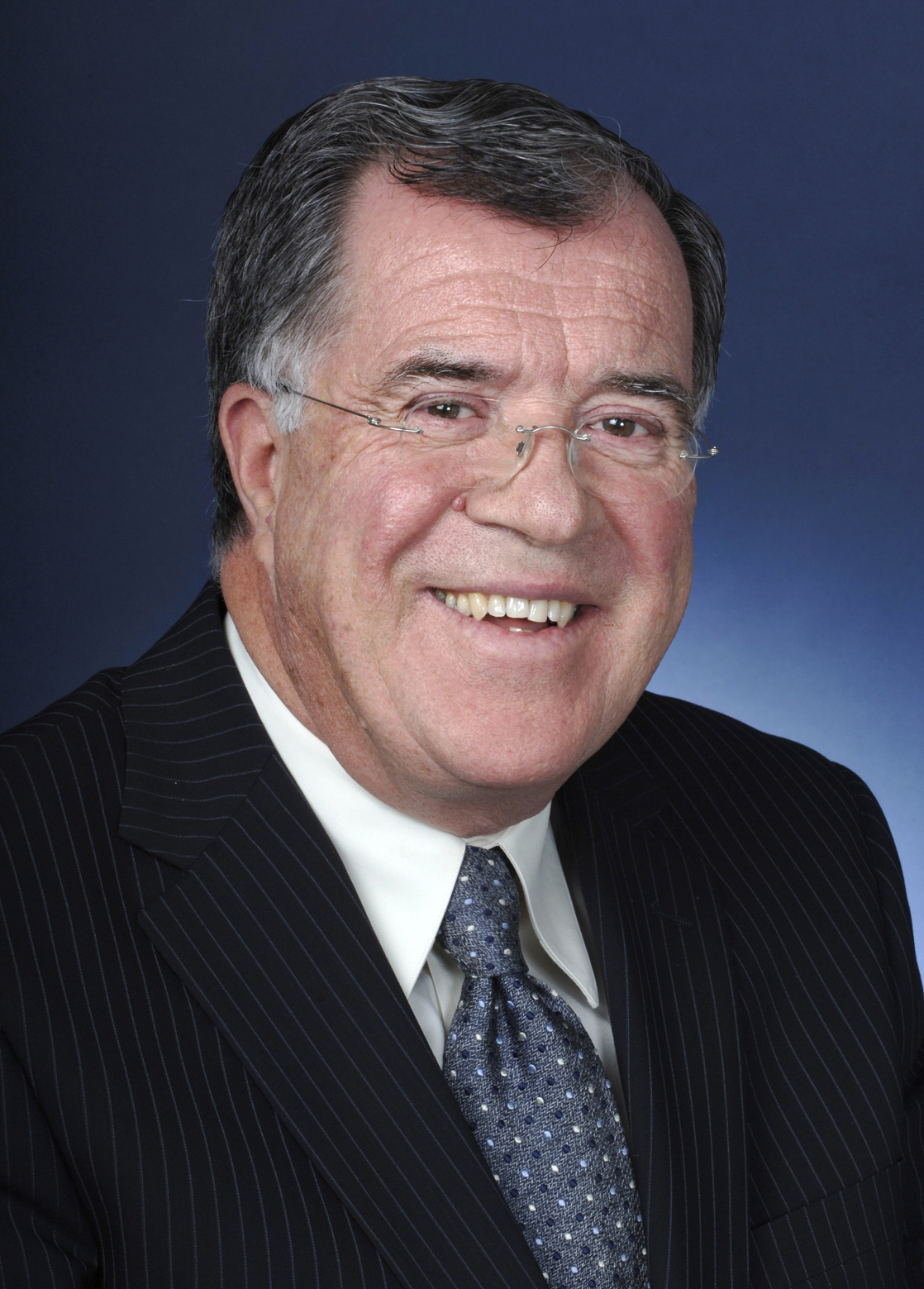
Paul O'Sullivan

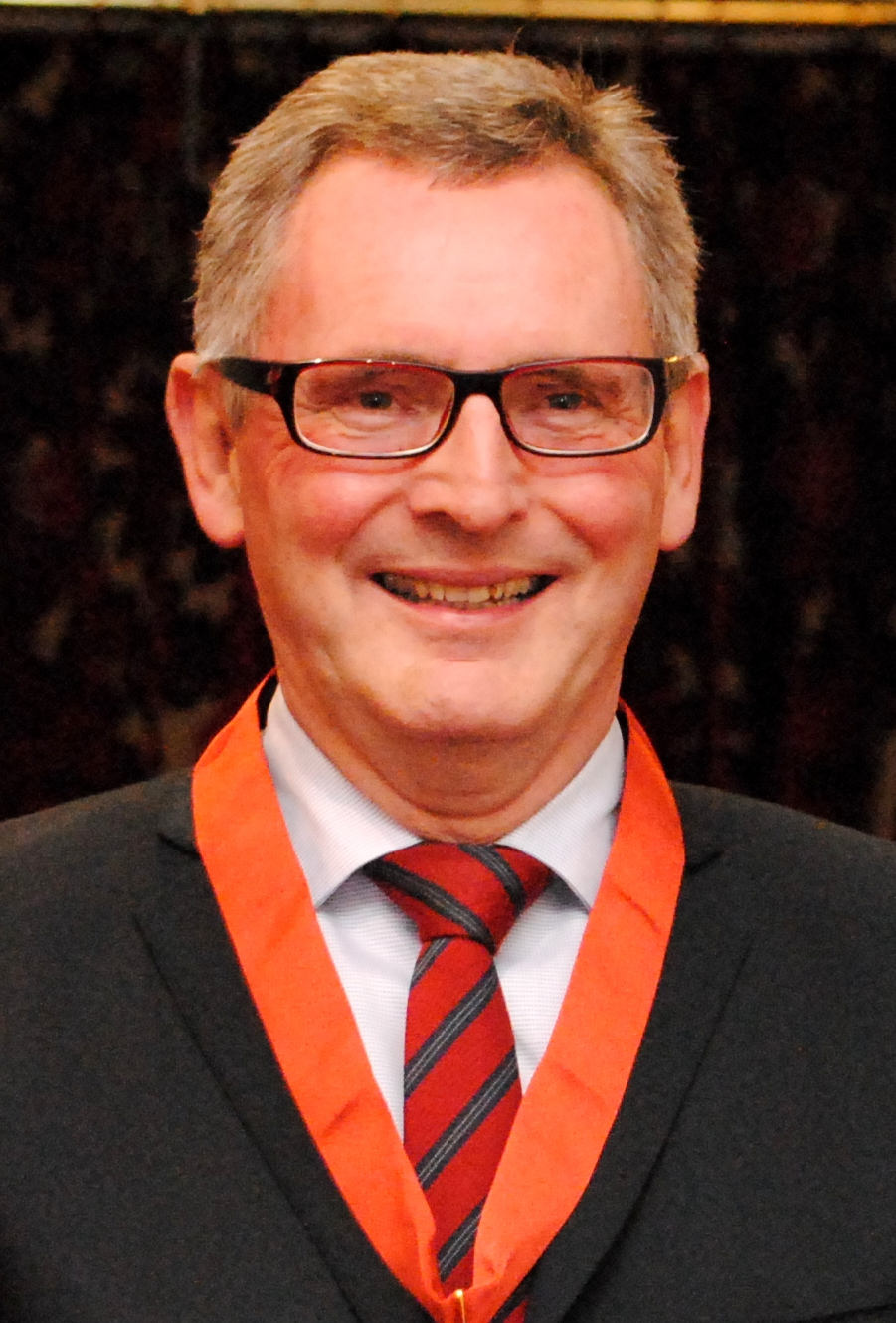
Chris Saines

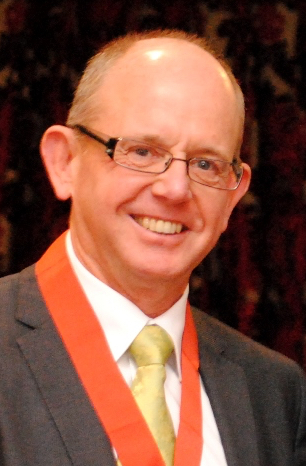
John Shewan

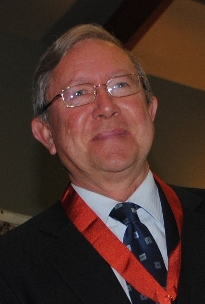
Peter Skegg

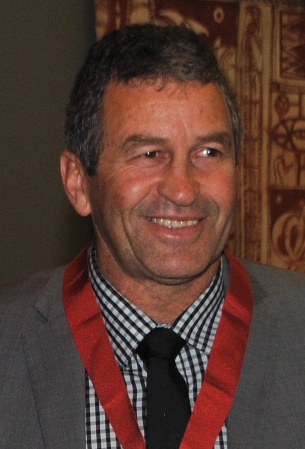
Wayne Smith

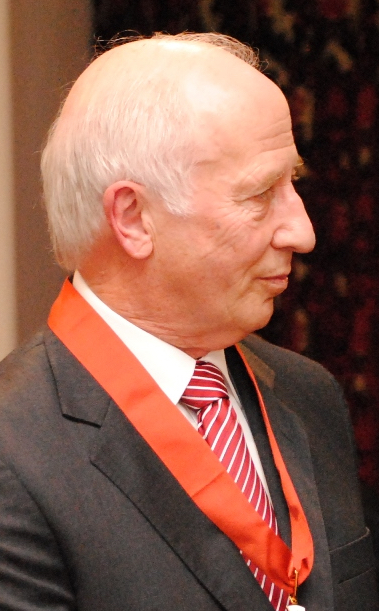
John Spencer

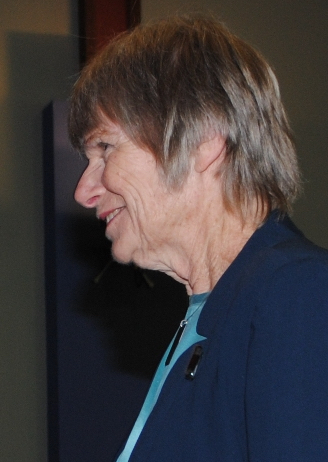
Christine Winterbourn

=== Officer (ONZM) ===
- Philip Brendan Aldridge – of Christchurch. For services to theatre.
- Emeritus Professor Peter Leonard Bergquist – of Auckland. For services to science.
- Leon Martyn Theodore Blanchet – of Leeston. For services to athletics.
- Robyn Denise Broughton MNZM – of Invercargill. For services to netball.
- Geoffrey John Chapple – of Auckland. For services to tramping, tourism and literature.
- Assistant Commissioner David Mark Cliff – of Rangiora. For services to the New Zealand Police and the community.
- Shane William Cotton – of Palmerston North. For services to the visual arts.
- Michael Thomas Eagle – of Christchurch. For services to rugby.
- Fiona Farrell – of Akaroa. For services to literature.
- Gregory William Gent – of Ruawai. For services to the dairy industry and corporate governance.
- Thomas James Gerrard JP – of Auckland. For services to education.
- Dr Ronald George Gibson – of Morrinsville. For services to veterinary science.
- David Timothy Gibson – of Wellington. For services to the film and television industry.
- Richard Alan Guy – of Waipu. For services to rugby.
- Brian Martin Hight – of Auckland. For services to agricultural publishing.
- Nigel Raymond Latta – of Auckland. For services as a psychologist.
- Graham Leonard Malaghan – of Auckland. For services to medical research and philanthropy.
- Bret Peter Tarrant McKenzie – of Wellington. For services to music and film.
- Peter Joseph McLeavey – of Wellington. For services to the arts.
- Margaret Medlyn – of Wellington. For services to opera.
- Nicholas Mark Mills – of Wellington. For services to basketball.
- Clive Paton – of Martinborough. For services to viticulture and conservation.
- John Puhiatau Pule – of Auckland. For services as an author, poet and painter.
- Professor John Patrick Shaw – of Auckland. For services to the health sector.
- Robert William Stanic QSM JP – of Auckland. For services to the community.
- John Andrew Sturgeon MBE – of Runanga. For services to rugby.
- Margaret Clair Tapper – of Auckland. For services to education and the community.
- Bridget Rosamund Williams MBE – of Wellington. For services to publishing.

Honorary

- Kap-Chong Chi OBE – of Seoul, Republic of South Korea. For services to New Zealand–Korean relations.
- Robert de Leur – of Auckland. For services to the building industry.
- Joseph Bruce Letteri – of Wellington. For services to film.
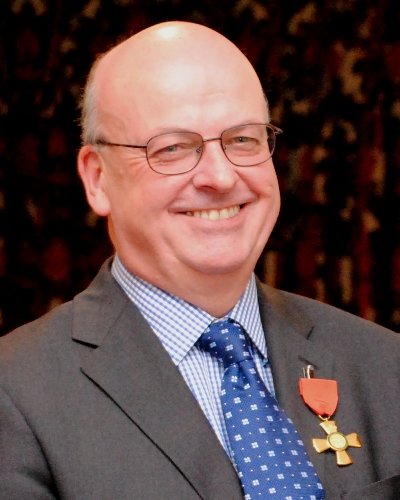
Philip Aldridge

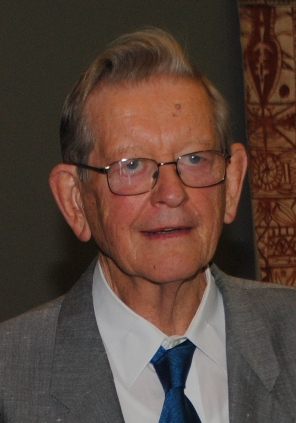
Peter Bergquist

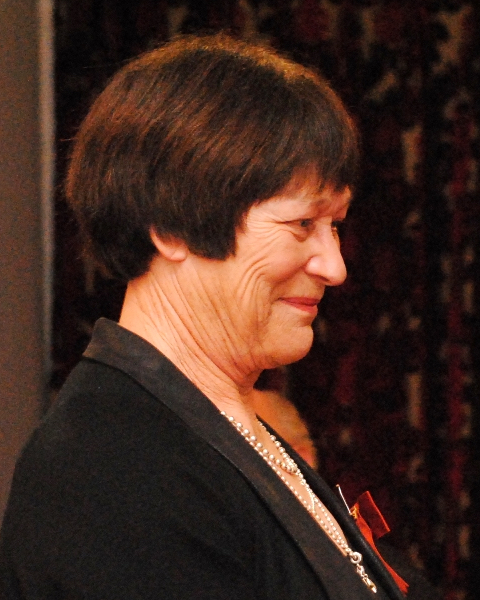
Robyn Broughton

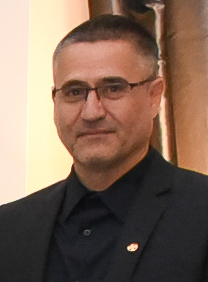
Shane Cotton

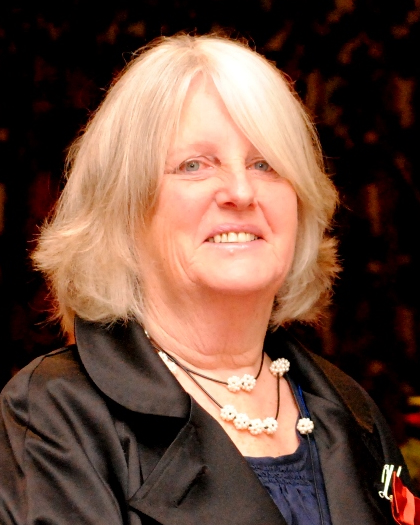
Fiona Farrell

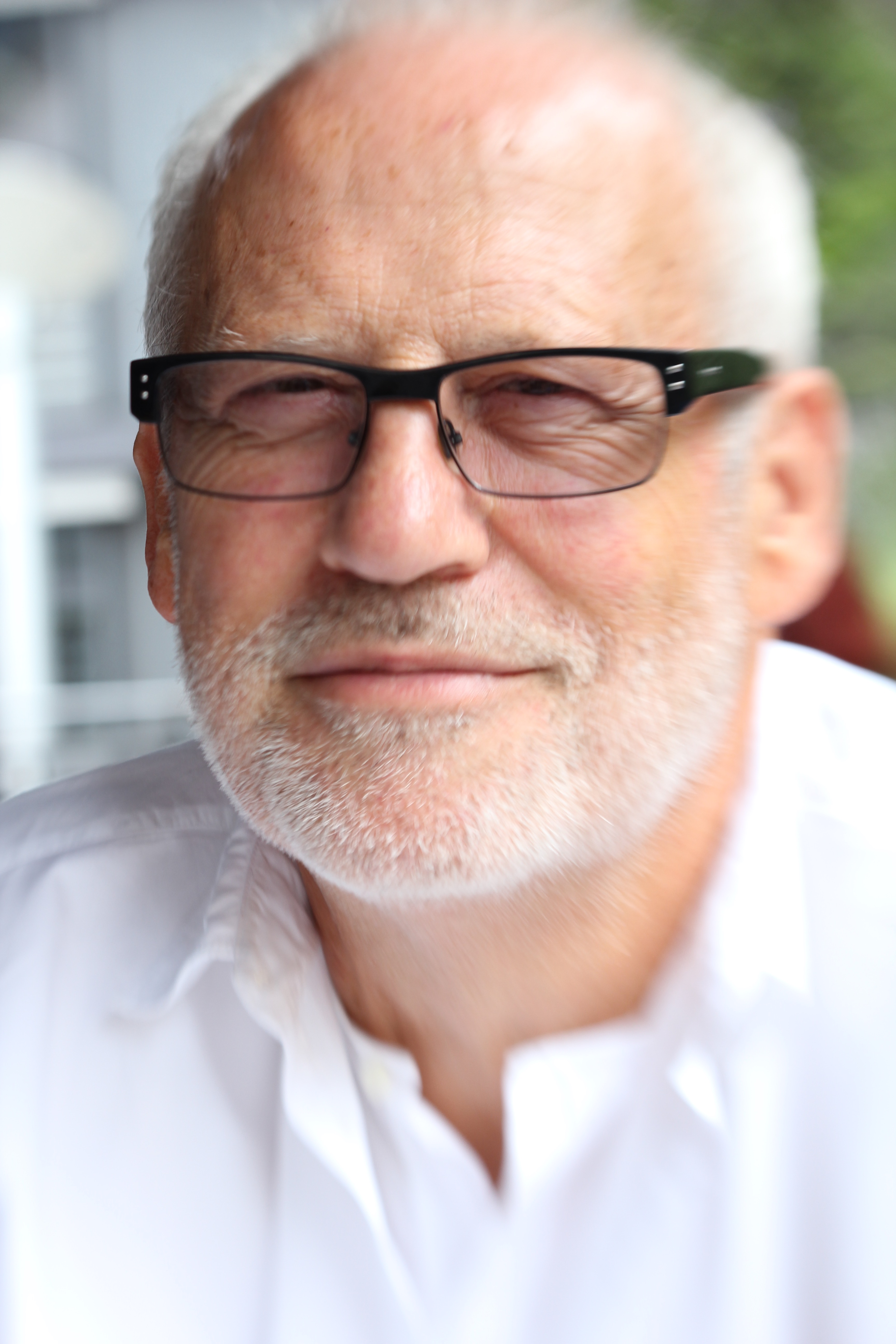
Dave Gibson

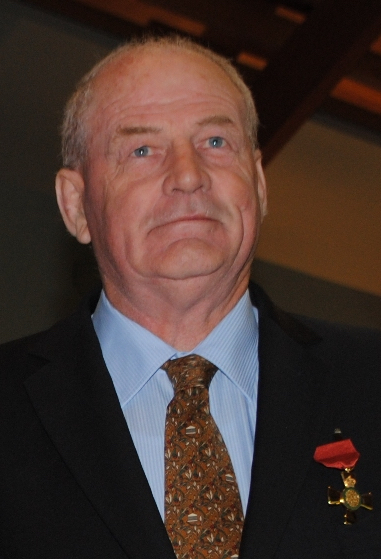
Richie Guy

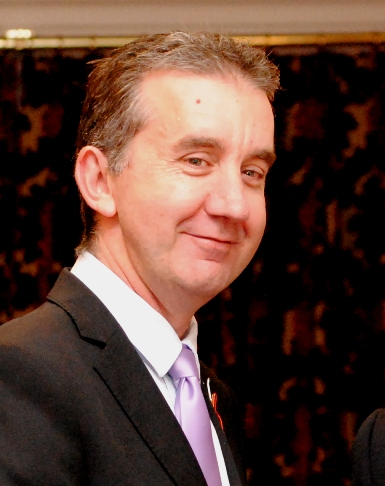
Nigel Latta

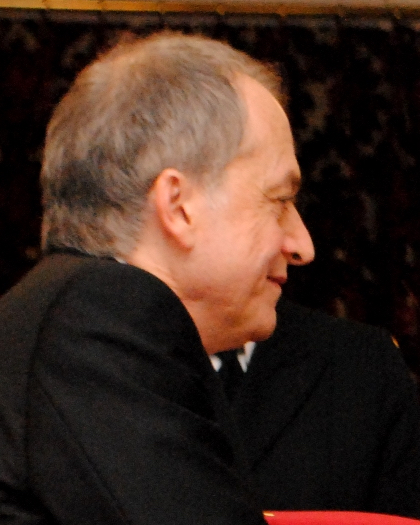
Joe Letteri

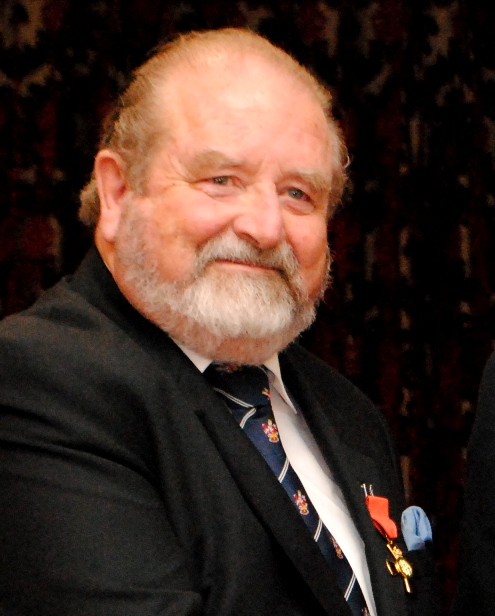
Graham Malaghan

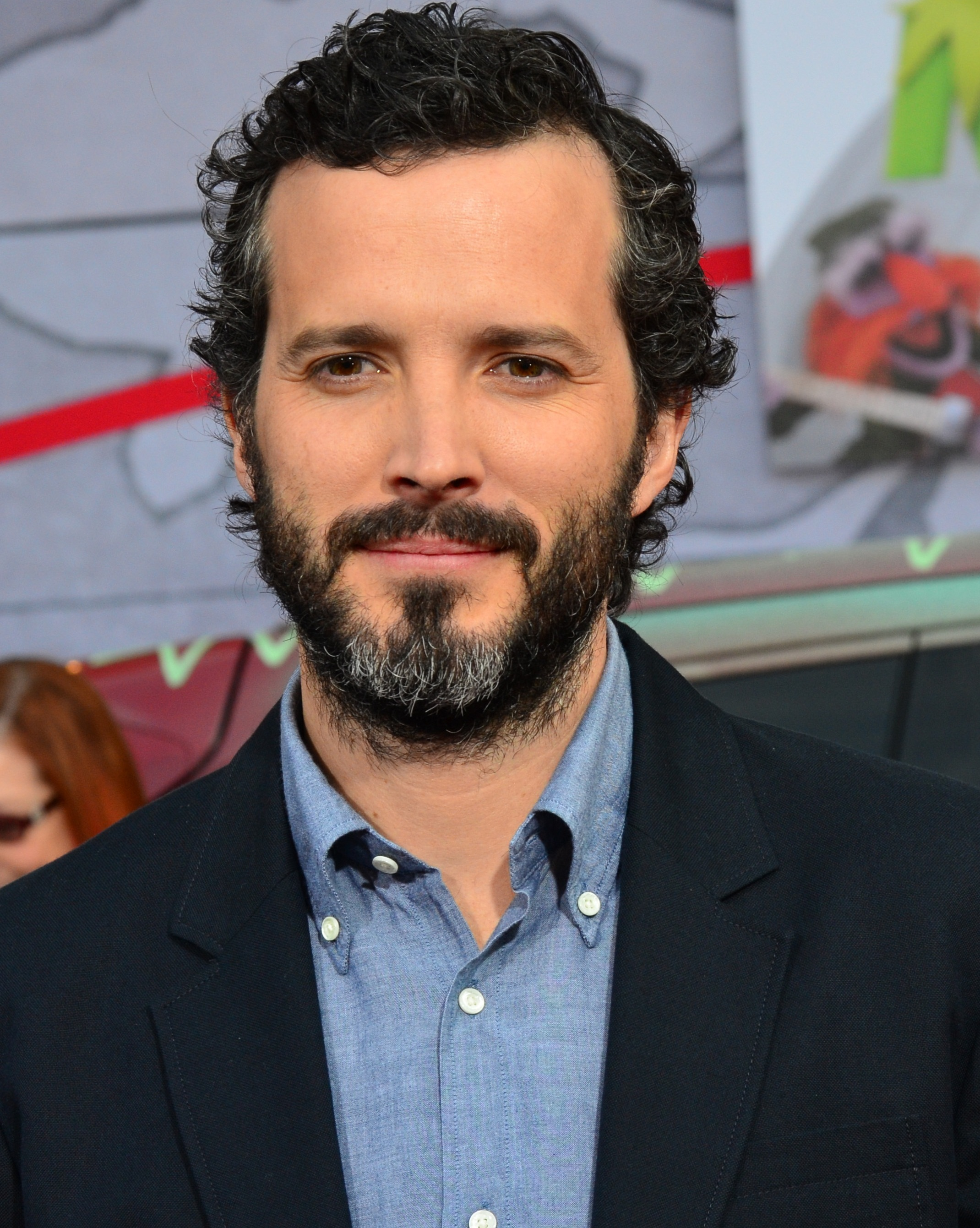
Bret McKenzie

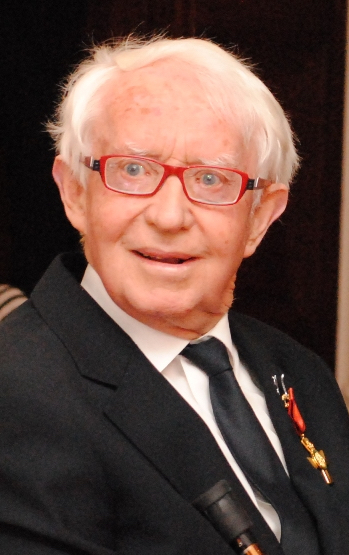
Peter McLeavey

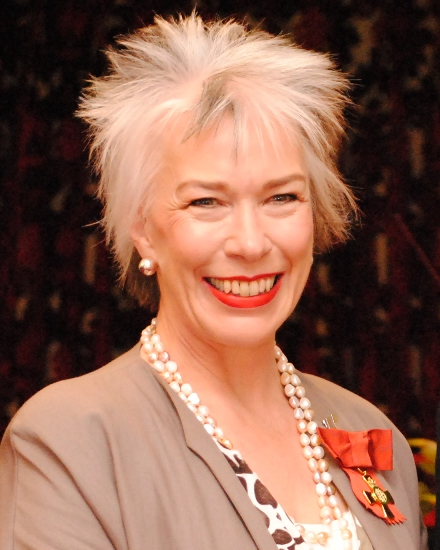
Margaret Medlyn

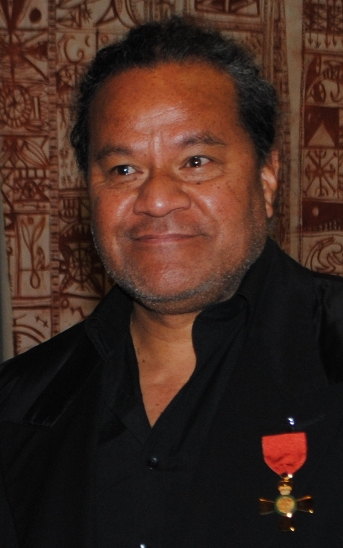
John Pule

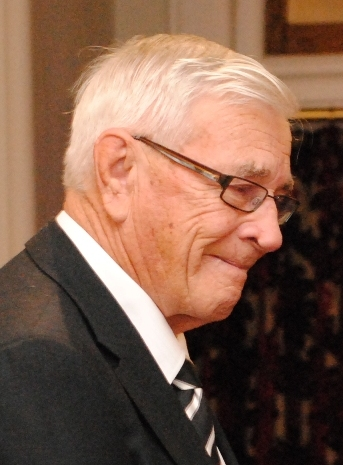
John Sturgeon

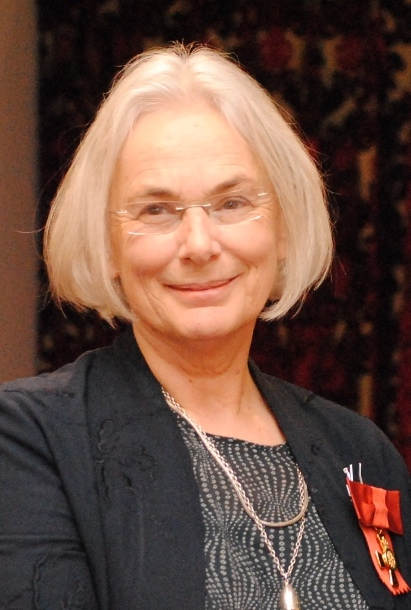
Bridget Williams

=== Member (MNZM) ===
- Edward George Allen – of Martinborough. For services to music.
- Sergeant Noel Francis Bigwood – of Waikanae. For services to Land Search and Rescue.
- James Alexander Blair – of Upper Hutt. For services to athletics.
- Susan Jane Bree – of Opua. For services to midwifery.
- Alister Douglas Malcolm Brown – of Wellington. For services as a chef.
- Fiona Louise Campbell – of Wānaka. For services to art philanthropy.
- Gary William Chapman – of Dubai, United Arab Emirates. For services to New Zealand–United Arab Emirates relations.
- Dale Devereux Copeland – of Ōkato. For services to the arts.
- Ross Alexander Corrigan JP – of Hāwera. For services to farming and the community.
- Patricia Anne Cunniffe – of Wanganui. For services to the community.
- Dr Peter James Foley – of Napier. For services to health.
- Lindsay Galloway – of Christchurch. For services to Chatham Islands agriculture.
- Temepara Anne George – of Auckland. For services to netball.
- John Anthony Gibson – of Auckland. For services to engineering and the community.
- Robert Gordon Henderson – of Auckland. For services to sporting aviation.
- William Beau Holland – of Tauranga. For services to the community.
- Tracey Tania Houpapa JP – of Hamilton. For services to business and Māori.
- David Douglas Charles Ivory – of Christchurch. For services to education and the community.
- Janet Muriel Jensen – of Morrinsville. For services to the community.
- Dr James Arthur Judson – of Auckland. For services to intensive-care medicine.
- Phelim Thaddeus Keinzley – of Greytown. For services to football.
- Irene Livingston, of Lower Hutt. For services to the community.
- Dean Robert Lonergan – of Auckland. For services to sport and philanthropy.
- Jordan William Hunter Luck – of Auckland. For services to music.
- Peta Christine Mathias – of Auckland. For services as an author and television presenter.
- Robyn Mathieson – of Wellington. For services to fashion.
- James Millton – of Gisborne. For services to the wine industry. (Note: Appointment cancelled and annulled, 28 May 2025.)
- Dr Robert Bruce Morrison DSM – of Cambridge. For services to medicine and the community.
- Dennis Anthony O'Rourke – of Palmerston North. For services to the Police and the community.
- Brenda Perry – of Auckland. For services to women's tennis.
- Robert Hedley Renwick – of Hamilton. For services to the motor vehicle industry.
- Trevor Shailer – of Wellington. For services to sport and the community.
- John David Thomas – of Auckland. For services to surf life saving.
- Colonel Hugh Gourlay Trengrove – of Auckland. For services to forensic science.
- Alfred James Wakefield – of Rangiora. For services to harness racing.
- Gary Michael Williams – of Christchurch. For services to disability support.
- Vera Whakaaronui Wilson – of Ohakune. For services to Māori, music and the community.
- Richard Harvey Wood – of Tauranga. For services to the State.

Honorary

- Stephen Ronald McKean – of New Plymouth. For services to sport.
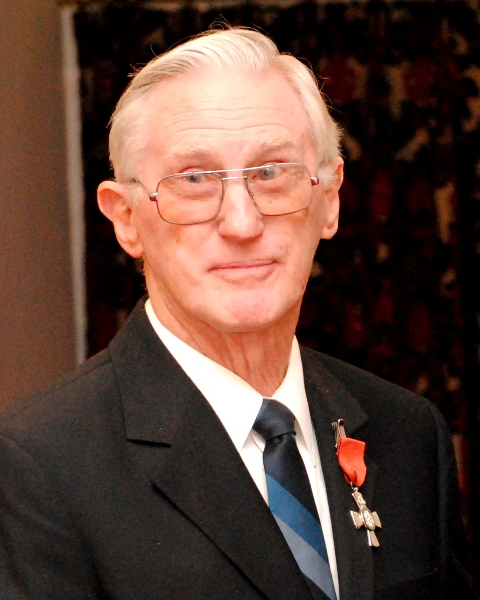
Jim Blair

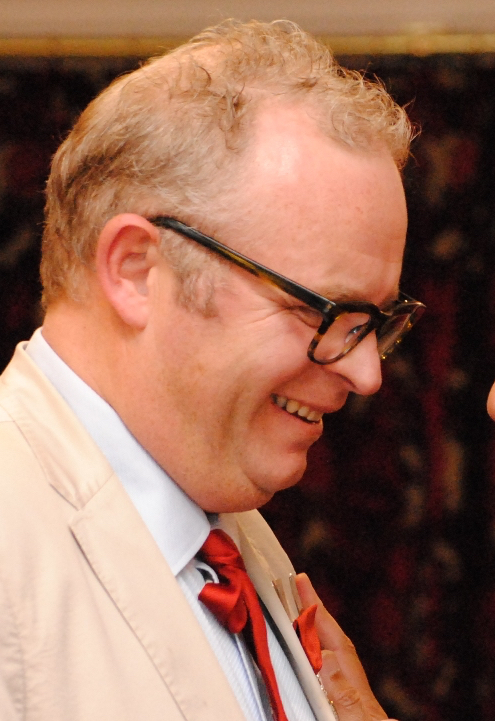
Al Brown

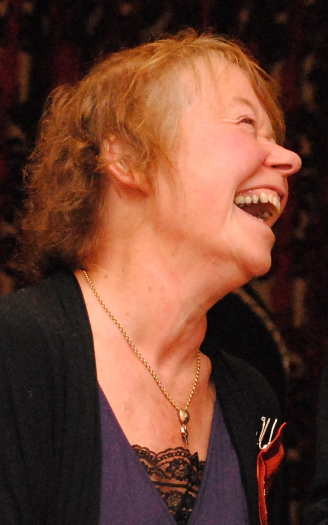
Dale Copeland

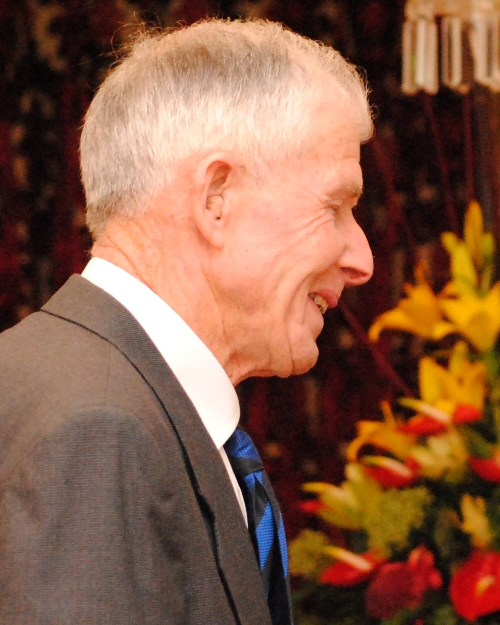
Ross Corrigan

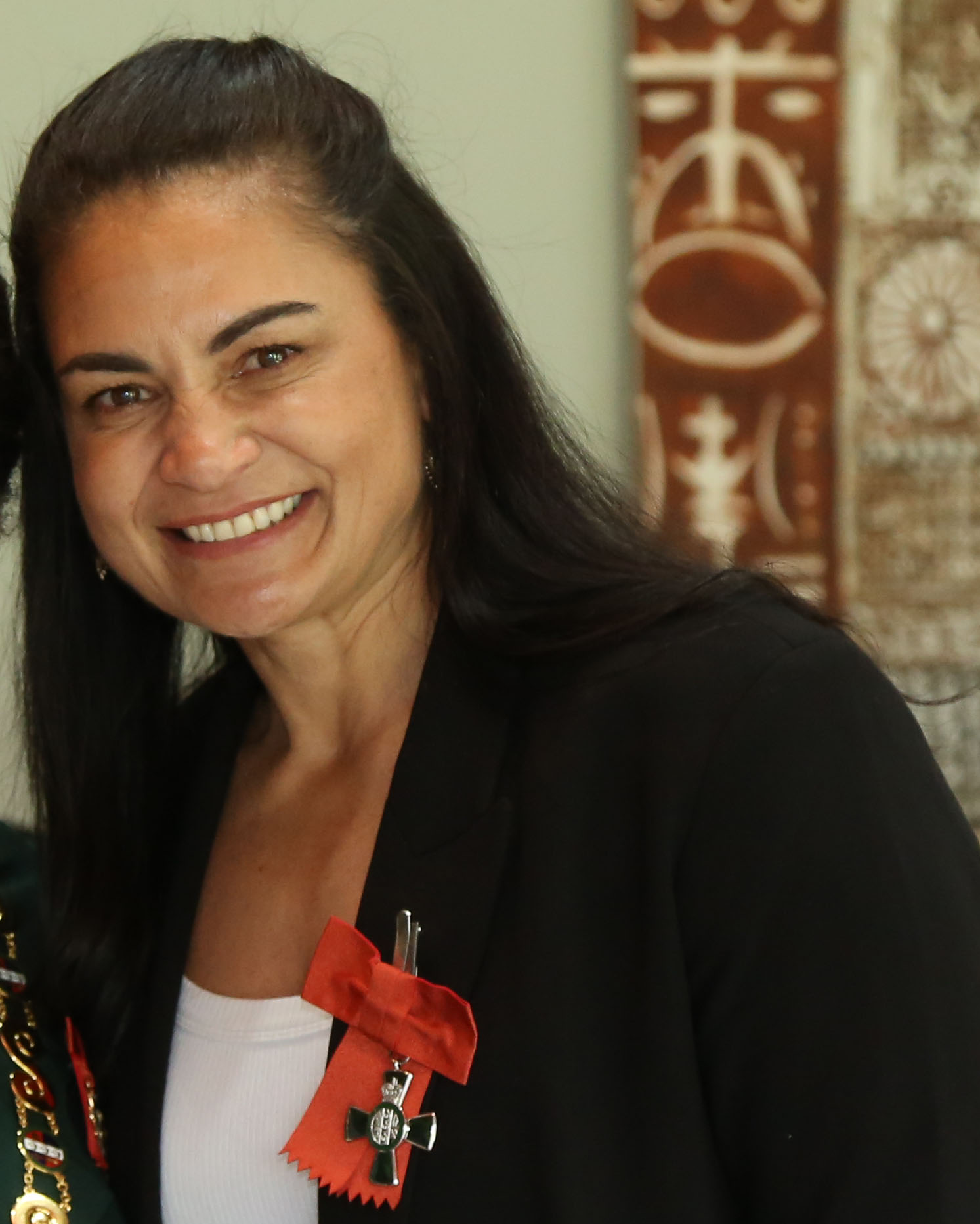
Temepara George

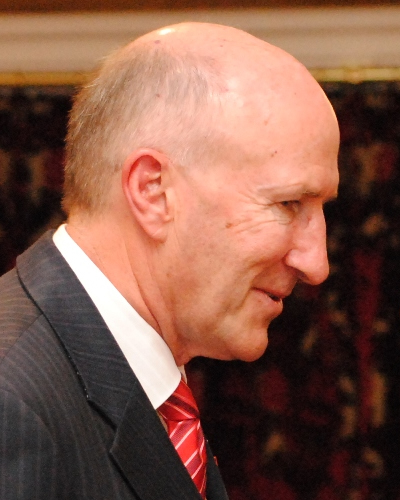
Bill Holland

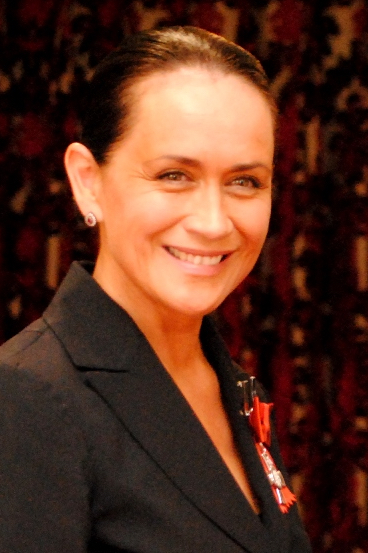
Traci Houpapa

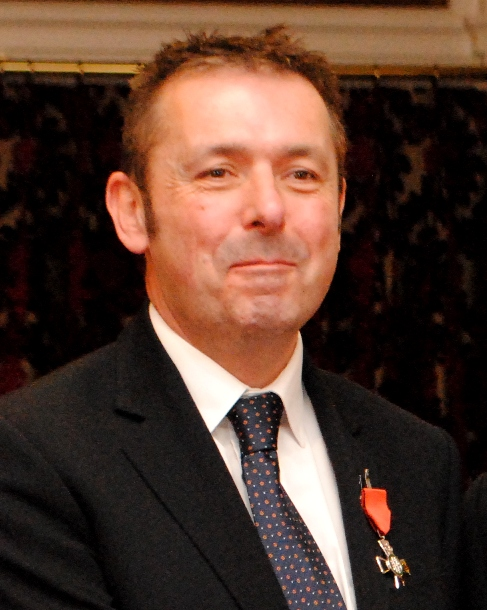
David Ivory

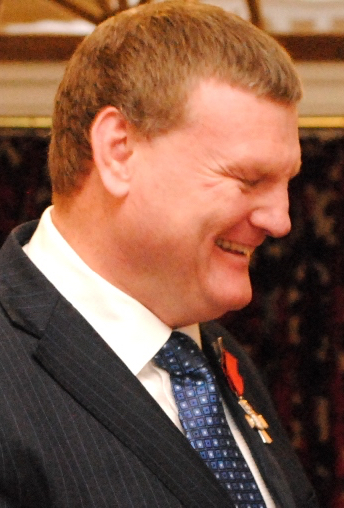
Dean Lonergan

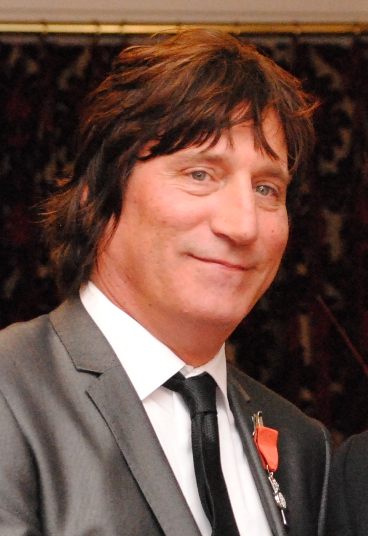
Jordan Luck

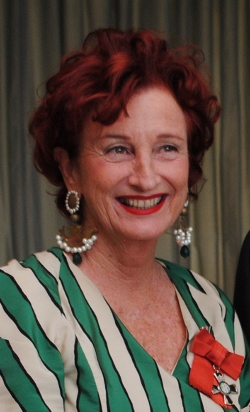
Peta Mathias

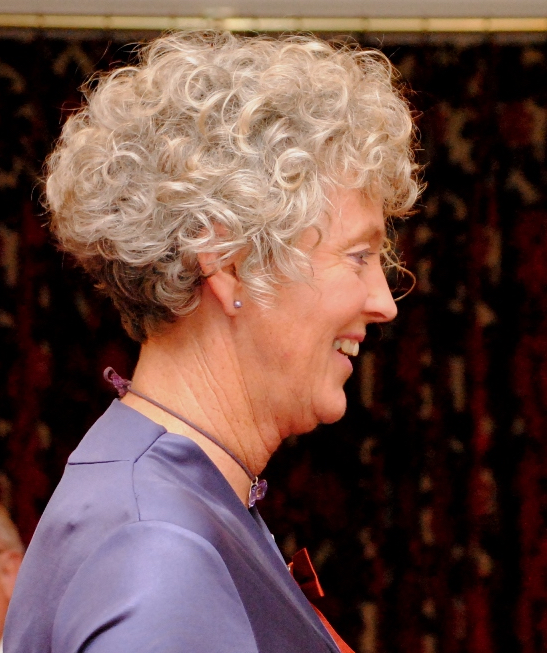
Brenda Perry

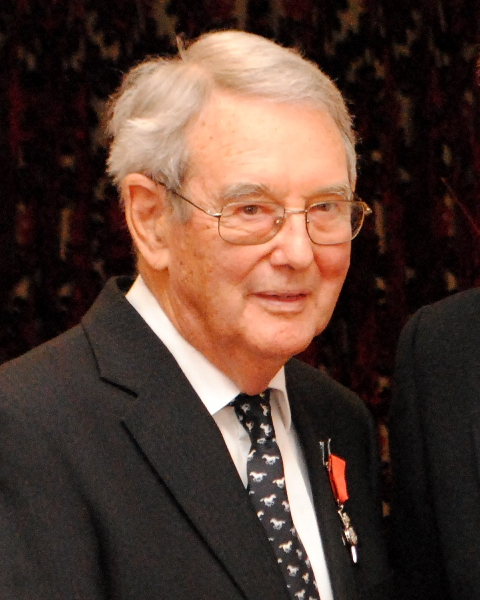
Jim Wakefield

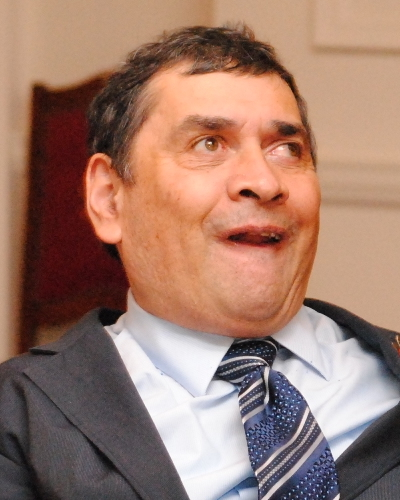
Gary Williams

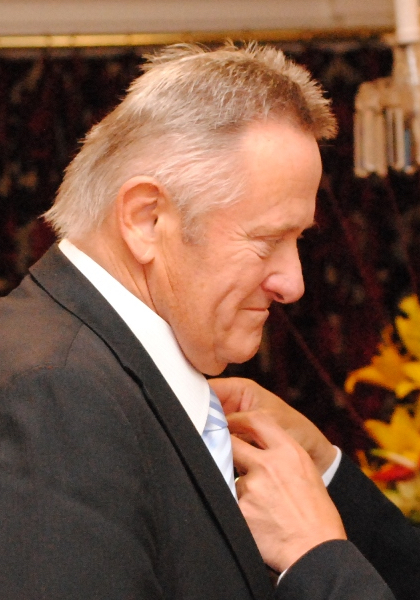
Steve McKean

== Companion of the Queen's Service Order (QSO) ==
- Dr Thomas Stephen Clarkson – of Lower Hutt. For services to Land Search and Rescue.
- Hiria Hape JP – of Tāneatua. For services to the State.
- Lewis Ruihi Moeau ED JP – of Wellington. For services to the State.
- The Honourable Simon James Power – of Auckland. For services as a Member of Parliament.
- Mark Rhys Weldon – of Queenstown. For services to the community and business.
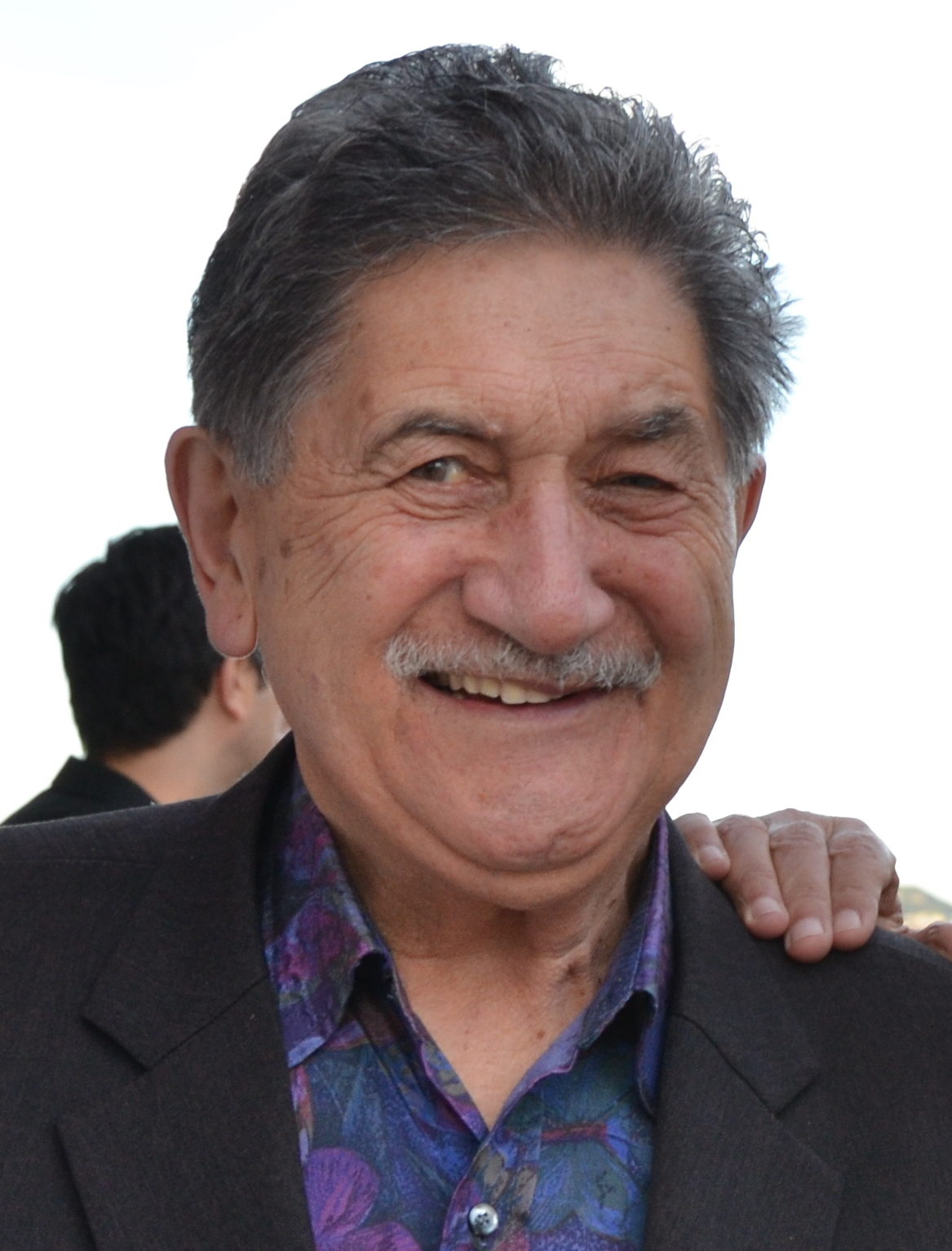
Lewis Moeau

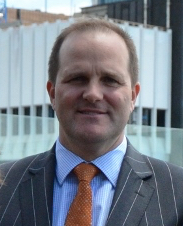
Simon Power

== Queen's Service Medal (QSM) ==
- Dorothy Rosemary Acland – of Peel Forest. For services to the community.
- Ruahine Albert JP – of Hamilton. For services to Māori and the community.
- Janet Bryce Anderson – of Queenstown. For services to education.
- Rainus James Baker – of Whakatāne. For services to people with an intellectual disability.
- Antony David Baker – of Picton. For services to maritime safety and marine conservation.
- Claire Lynette Ballantyne – of Christchurch. For services to ophthalmology and the community.
- Shona Joyce Beck – of Kaitangata. For services to the community.
- Paul Francis Berry – of Greymouth. For services to the community.
- Yvonne Moana Bidois – of Rotorua. For services to Māori.
- Eric Alexander Bonny – of Woodville. For services to the community.
- Megan Christine Bowden – of Auckland. For services to primary education.
- Chief Fire Officer James Nigel Bowmar – of Wellsford. For services to the New Zealand Fire Service.
- Roderick de Bolton Bryant – of Hamilton. For services to the community.
- Lindsay Robert Burnell – of Levin. For services to the community.
- Takawhiti Te Oraiti Calcott – of Ōtaki. For services to Māori and education.
- Lenh Phong Chin – of Auckland. For services to the Chinese community.
- Brian Mansel Diver – of Tauranga. For services to youth sport.
- Wade Thomas Doak – of Whangārei. For services to marine conservation.
- Garrick Albert Dumble JP – of Timaru. For services to the community.
- Kathleen Ellen Egan – of Napier. For services to the community.
- Judith Eirene Finn – of Te Aroha. For services to the community.
- Sister Marie Annie Fitzpatrick – of Dunedin. For services to the community.
- Carol Ann Fowler – of Motueka. For services to the community.
- Detective Inspector Andrew James Gallagher – of Auckland. For services to the New Zealand Police and the community.
- Inspector Brendon James Gibson – of Wellington. For services to the New Zealand Police and the community.
- Dr Adriana Gunder JP – of Auckland. For services to the community.
- Renzie Jon Hanham – of Kaiapoi. For services to karate.
- Hohepa Joseph Harawira – of Whakatāne. For services to sawmillers' health.
- Professor Glyn John Harper – of Palmerston North. For services to historical research.
- Hemi Hema – of Hamilton. For services to the deaf.
- Colin Edward Heslop – of Culverden. For services to the community.
- Antonia Maria Jenkins – of Christchurch. For services to conservation.
- David Murray Land – of Taupō. For services to the community.
- Graeme Alister Leggat – of Auckland. For services to the community.
- Alison Macaulay Linscott – of Timaru. For services to the community.
- John Shaw Lockyer – of Feilding. For services as a rugby referee.
- Edward Matchitt – of Ōpōtiki. For services to Māori.
- Yeverley Kristine McCarthy – of Wānaka. For services to the community.
- Richard John Russell McDonnell – of Auckland. For services to brass bands.
- Shirley Ann McGlinchey – of Hāwera. For services to the community.
- Ross John McKenzie – of Kaiapoi. For services to Scouting New Zealand.
- Ian Murray McKinnon JP – of Auckland. or services to athletics.
- Erin Rose McMenamin – of Lower Hutt. For services to the community.
- Senior Sergeant Richard Oliver McPhail – of Gore. For services to the New Zealand Police and the community.
- Alan Albert McQuarters – of Ashburton. For services to the community.
- Athol Euan McQueen – of Wellington. For services to rail transport and education.
- Nancy Merriman JP – of Mount Maunganui. For services to the community.
- James Harding Crosby Morris – of Omarama. For services to the community.
- Patricia Mary Morrison – of Wellington. For services to the prison library service.
- Dr David Henry Mossman – of Havelock North. For services to veterinary science.
- Nirmala Devi Nand JP – of Palmerston North. For services to the community.
- Freda Narev – of Auckland. For services to the community.
- Jillian Clare Nerheny – of North Shore City. For services to the community.
- Valda Mae Peacock – of Waipukurau. For services to theatre.
- Frances Karen Pointon – of Lower Hutt. For services to Māori and the deaf community.
- Carol Linda Quirk – of Ōpōtiki. For services to surf life saving.
- Davinder Singh Rahal JP – of Auckland. For services to the Indian community.
- John Wiremu Ransfield – of Rotorua. For services to the New Zealand Police and the community.
- Gerald Stanley Rea – of Auckland. For services to the community.
- Brian Edward Roberts – of Christchurch. For services to aviation.
- Robyn Mary Gaye Simmons – of Blenheim. For services to Highland dancing.
- Ariana Simpson – of Hamilton. For services to Māori and the community.
- Noel Terrence Steele – of Totara Flat. For services to hockey.
- Verna Elizabeth Stevens – of Gore. For services to the RSA and the community.
- Susan Marie Stevens – of Queenstown. For services to the community.
- John Dougal Stevenson – of Dunedin. For services to broadcasting.
- James Michael Strang – of Christchurch. For services to New Zealand–Nepal relations.
- Mujeeb Syed – of Auckland. For services to the Muslim community.
- David Tamatea – of Ōpunake. For services to disability support and Māori.
- Tavale Tanuvasa – of Auckland. For services to education.
- Colin Charles Thomas – of Northland. For services to the New Zealand Fire Service.
- Robyn Frances Towersey – of Whakatāne. For services to health and the community.
- Hugh Davidson Treadwell JP – of Taupō. For services to the community.
- John Mark von Dadelszen – of Hastings. For services to the community.
- Patrick David Waite JP – of Porirua. For services to the community.
- Chief Fire Officer John Allan Walker – of Coromandel. For services to the community.
- Vicki Louise Wall – of Lower Hutt. For services to people with disabilities.
- Brenda Woolley – of Christchurch. For services to Urban Search and Rescue.
- Kuan Cheong Yap JP – of Auckland. For services to the community.
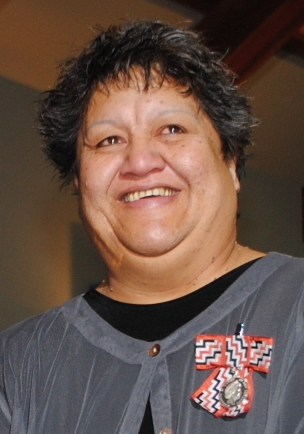
Ruahine Albert

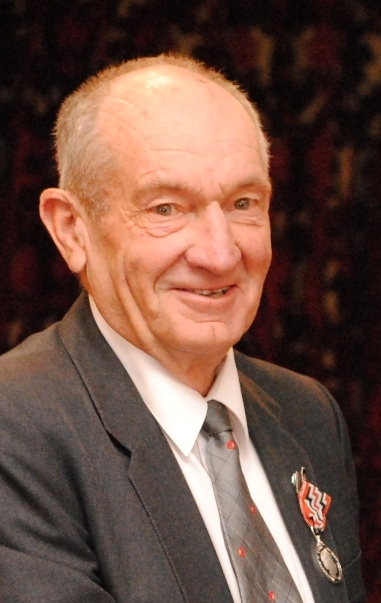
Paul Berry

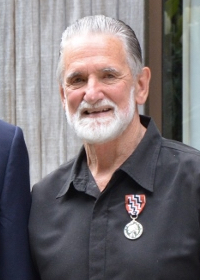
Wade Doak

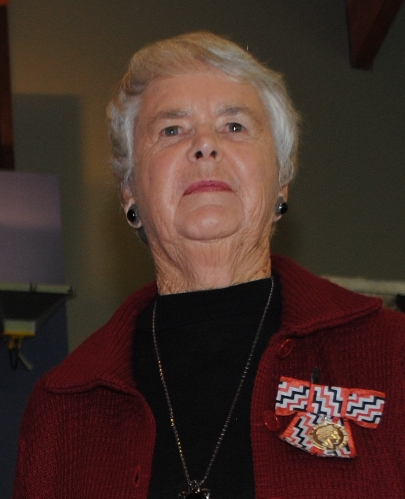
Judith Finn

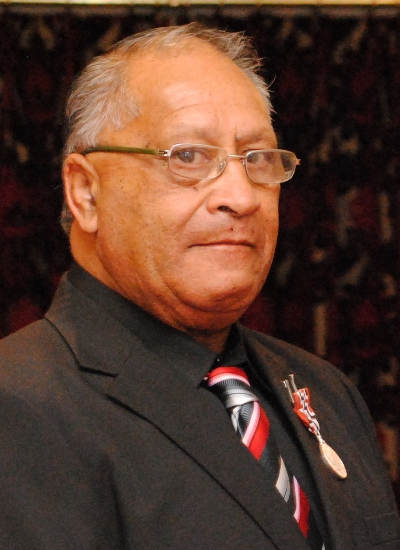
Joe Harawira

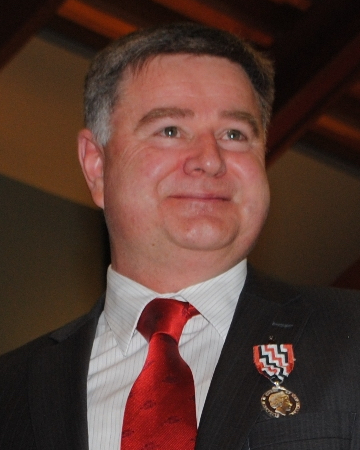
Glyn Harper

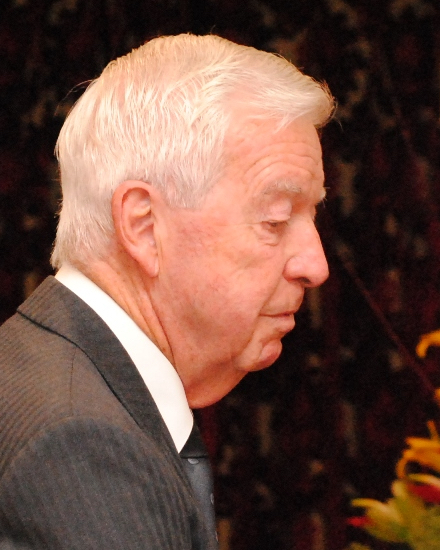
Graeme Leggat

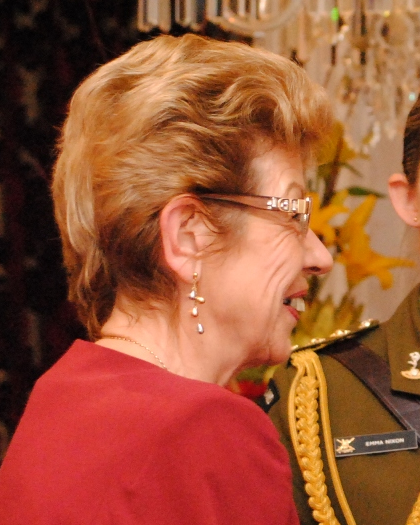
Valda Peacock

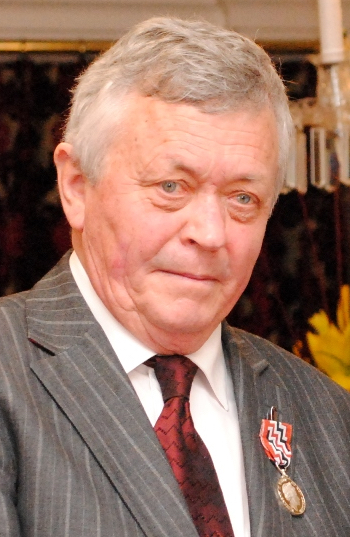
Dougal Stevenson

== New Zealand Distinguished Service Decoration (DSD) ==
- Major David Bruce Ackroyd – of Upper Hutt. For services to the New Zealand Defence Force.
- Lieutenant Layamon John Bakewell – of North Shore City. For services to the New Zealand Defence Force.
- Squadron Leader Aaron Douglas Benton – of Auckland. For services to the New Zealand Defence Force.
- Lieutenant Colonel Hugh Richard McAslan – of Burnham. For services to the New Zealand Defence Force.
- Warrant Officer Class 1 Christopher James Wilson – of Upper Hutt. For services to the New Zealand Defence Force.
