= Ōkato =

Town in Taranaki, New Zealand

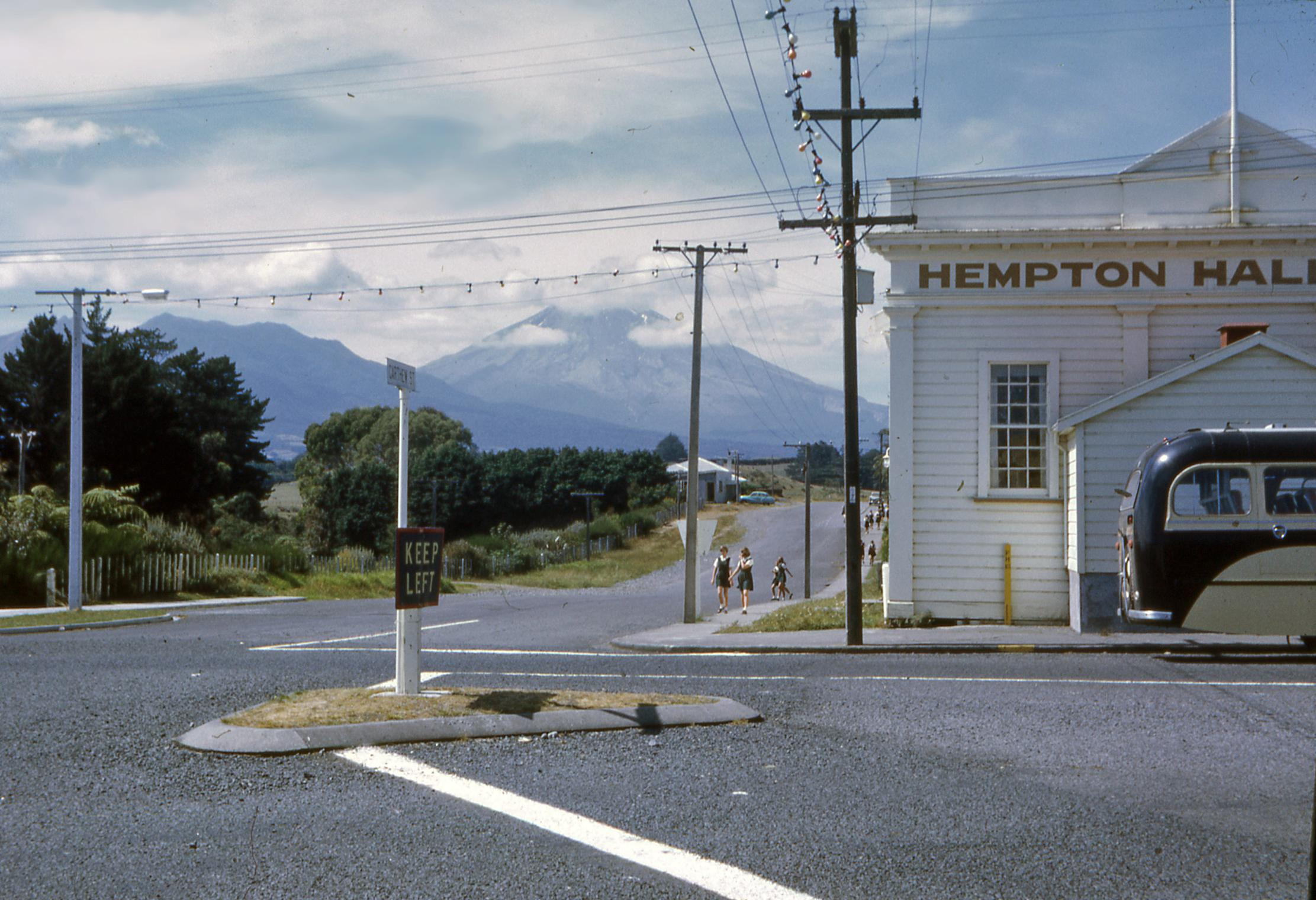
- Hempton Hall in Ōkato in 1968
- Interactive map of Ōkato
- Coordinates: 39°12′S 173°53′E
- Country: New Zealand
- Region: Taranaki Region
- Territorial authority: New Plymouth District
- Ward: Kaitake-Ngāmotu General Ward; Te Purutanga Mauri Pūmanawa Māori Ward
- Community: Kaitake Community
- Electorates: New Plymouth; Te Tai Hauāuru (Māori)

Government
  - Territorial Authority: New Plymouth District Council
  - Regional council: Taranaki Regional Council
  - Mayor of New Plymouth: Max Brough
  - New Plymouth MP: David MacLeod
  - Te Tai Hauāuru MP: Debbie Ngarewa-Packer

Area
  - Total: 1.02 km^{2} (0.39 sq mi)

Population (June 2025)
  - Total: 720
  - Density: 710/km^{2} (1,800/sq mi)

Ōkato is a small town in rural Taranaki, New Zealand. It is situated about 25 minutes drive around the coast from New Plymouth on State Highway 45. Ōakura is 12 km to the north-east, and Warea is 9 km to the south-west. The place offers popular rocky surfing spots around coastal beaches. The town was established as a military settlement in the 1860s.

The New Zealand Ministry for Culture and Heritage gives a translation of "place of Kato" for Ōkato. While "Kato" was probably a personal name, an alternative translation is "place of full tide/tsunami". In July 2020, the name of the locality was officially gazetted as Ōkato by the New Zealand Geographic Board.

Ōkato has all the elements of a New Zealand rural community with sporting facilities (rugby grounds, bowling club, squash courts, tennis courts and swimming pool), Coastal Taranaki School, a police station, and a volunteer fire brigade.

Ōkato was also notable as the home of Okato Cheese which was manufactured by the Okato Co-operative Dairy Company. This manufacturing site closed some years after merging with Egmont Co-operative Dairy. Activities in the Ōkato area include the Stony River walkway, which has a number of locations for photographing Mt Taranaki.

The rural community of Puniho is located just south of Ōkato.

== Demographics ==
Ōkato is described by Stats NZ as a rural settlement which covers 1.02 km^{2} (0.39 sq mi). It had an estimated population of 720 as of June 2025, with a population density of 706 people per km^{2}. Ōkato is part of the larger Kaitake statistical area.

Historical population for Ōkato
Year	Pop.	±% p.a.
2006	531	—
2013	561	+0.79%
2018	606	+1.56%
2023	711	+3.25%

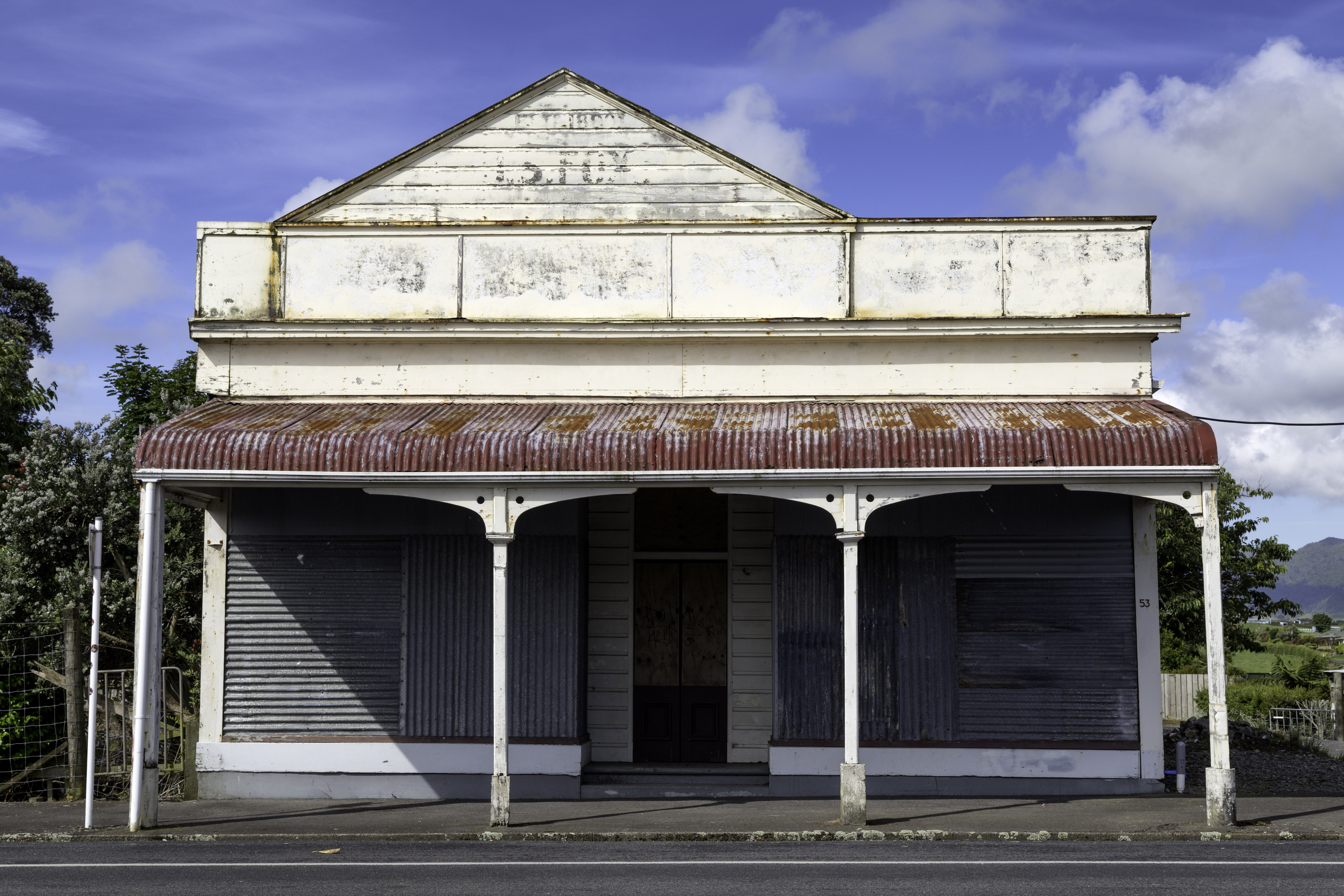
Boarded up store in Ōkato

Ōkato had a population of 711 in the 2023 New Zealand census, an increase of 105 people (17.3%) since the 2018 census, and an increase of 150 people (26.7%) since the 2013 census. There were 342 males, 366 females, and 3 people of other genders in 258 dwellings. 3.0% of people identified as LGBTIQ+. The median age was 35.2 years (compared with 38.1 years nationally). There were 192 people (27.0%) aged under 15 years, 99 (13.9%) aged 15 to 29, 333 (46.8%) aged 30 to 64, and 87 (12.2%) aged 65 or older.

People could identify as more than one ethnicity. The results were 87.8% European (Pākehā); 24.1% Māori; 1.3% Pasifika; 1.3% Asian; 0.4% Middle Eastern, Latin American and African New Zealanders (MELAA); and 3.4% other, which includes people giving their ethnicity as "New Zealander". English was spoken by 96.2%, Māori by 5.9%, and other languages by 4.2%. No language could be spoken by 3.0% (e.g. too young to talk). New Zealand Sign Language was known by 0.4%. The percentage of people born overseas was 17.7, compared with 28.8% nationally.

Religious affiliations were 19.0% Christian, 1.3% Māori religious beliefs, 0.4% New Age, and 0.4% other religions. People who answered that they had no religion were 67.5%, and 11.0% of people did not answer the census question.

Of those at least 15 years old, 123 (23.7%) people had a bachelor's or higher degree, 282 (54.3%) had a post-high school certificate or diploma, and 117 (22.5%) people exclusively held high school qualifications. The median income was $37,100, compared with $41,500 nationally. 30 people (5.8%) earned over $100,000 compared to 12.1% nationally. The employment status of those at least 15 was 246 (47.4%) full-time, 87 (16.8%) part-time, and 21 (4.0%) unemployed.

=== Kaitake statistical area ===
Kaitake statistical area covers 170.29 km^{2} (65.75 sq mi) and had an estimated population of 2,300 as of June 2025, with a population density of 14 people per km^{2}.

Historical population for Kaitake
Year	Pop.	±% p.a.
2006	1,554	—
2013	1,632	+0.70%
2018	1,932	+3.43%
2023	2,232	+2.93%

Kaitake had a population of 2,232 in the 2023 New Zealand census, an increase of 300 people (15.5%) since the 2018 census, and an increase of 600 people (36.8%) since the 2013 census. There were 1,086 males, 1,143 females, and 3 people of other genders in 780 dwellings. 2.3% of people identified as LGBTIQ+. The median age was 39.1 years (compared with 38.1 years nationally). There were 540 people (24.2%) aged under 15 years, 285 (12.8%) aged 15 to 29, 1,086 (48.7%) aged 30 to 64, and 318 (14.2%) aged 65 or older.

People could identify as more than one ethnicity. The results were 93.1% European (Pākehā); 15.3% Māori; 1.1% Pasifika; 1.5% Asian; 1.1% Middle Eastern, Latin American and African New Zealanders (MELAA); and 3.5% other, which includes people giving their ethnicity as "New Zealander". English was spoken by 97.3%, Māori by 4.2%, Samoan by 0.1%, and other languages by 5.6%. No language could be spoken by 2.4% (e.g. too young to talk). New Zealand Sign Language was known by 0.4%. The percentage of people born overseas was 16.5, compared with 28.8% nationally.

Religious affiliations were 24.3% Christian, 0.3% Hindu, 0.7% Māori religious beliefs, 0.1% Buddhist, 0.7% New Age, 0.1% Jewish, and 1.1% other religions. People who answered that they had no religion were 63.7%, and 9.3% of people did not answer the census question.

Of those at least 15 years old, 435 (25.7%) people had a bachelor's or higher degree, 948 (56.0%) had a post-high school certificate or diploma, and 309 (18.3%) people exclusively held high school qualifications. The median income was $40,000, compared with $41,500 nationally. 198 people (11.7%) earned over $100,000 compared to 12.1% nationally. The employment status of those at least 15 was 831 (49.1%) full-time, 351 (20.7%) part-time, and 39 (2.3%) unemployed.

== Education ==
Coastal Taranaki School is a coeducational composite (years 1-13) school with a roll of 240 as of July 2026. The school was formed in 2005 from the merger of Newall School, Okato Primary School, Okato College and Warea School. It was initially called Okato Area School but changed its name.

== Notable people ==
- Kendra Cocksedge – rugby union player
- Dale Copeland – artist
- Gavin Hill – rugby union and rugby league player
- Tiny Hill – rugby union player
- Terry O'Sullivan – rugby union player
