= Steve McKean =

New Zealand basketball coach (died 2021)

Steve McKean MNZM
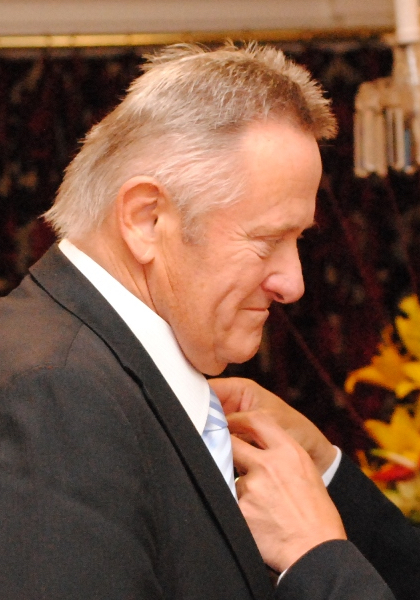
- McKean in 2012

Personal information
- Born: 1943 or 1944 United States
- Died: 3 May 2021 (aged 77) New Plymouth, New Zealand
- Listed height: 6 ft 0 in (1.83 m)

Career information
- College: San Jose State (1967–1970)
- NBA draft: 1970: undrafted
- Playing career: 1971–1978
- Position: Guard
- Coaching career: 1971–1995

Career history

Playing
- 1971–1978: Panmure

Coaching
- 1971–1978: Panmure (player-coach)
- 1972–1981: New Zealand national team
- 1990–1995: New Plymouth Bears

Career highlights
- New Zealand NBL Coach of the Year (1992)

Stephen Ronald McKean MNZM (1943 or 1944 – 3 May 2021) was an American-born New Zealand basketball coach. He was coach of the New Zealand men's national basketball team, and also coached in the New Zealand NBL. He moved from Auckland to Taranaki in 1990 and became the first regional director of the Taranaki Secondary Schools' Sports Association. He became an influential figure in the Taranaki sporting scene, encouraging and inspiring young people across the region.

== Early life ==
McKean grew up in Mantorville, Minnesota and graduated from Kasson-Mantorville high school in 1961. After spending some time in the air force he played Division 1 College Basketball at San Jose State College.

== New Zealand ==
McKean was convinced to come to play basketball in New Zealand by his old teammate and friend Bob South. He moved to Auckland and played for the Panmure team and began to coach the Auckland side. He coached the Men's national side from 1972–1981. His run at the helm included a breakthrough win against Australia in 1978. He moved to New Plymouth in 1990 working as a PE teacher as well as taking on the head coach role with the Taranaki men's side. He coached in the National Basketball League for nine years and became the first coach to chalk up 100 wins in the competition.

== Sporting mentor ==
McKean was the first Regional Director of the Taranaki Secondary Schools' Sports Association (TSSSA) and was an influential figure at Sport Taranaki, the regional sports trust. Speaking in 2021 Sport Taranaki CEO Michael Carr said McKean was at the heart of Taranaki sport for decades, encouraging and inspiring young people across the region as a mentor, secondary school sports co-ordinator and regional sports director.

== Awards ==
He won the New Zealand NBL Coach of the Year Award in 1992 and received the Basketball New Zealand Coach of the Year Award in 1978 and 2002. In the 2012 Queen's Birthday and Diamond Jubilee Honours, he was appointed an honorary Member of the New Zealand Order of Merit, for services to sport.

McKean died on 3 May 2021, aged 77, from cancer. Hundreds of people from across New Zealand attended his funeral held at the TSB Stadium in New Plymouth on 10 May 2021.
