= Joe Harawira =

New Zealand Māori elder and environmental campaigner (1946–2017)

Joseph Harawira QSM
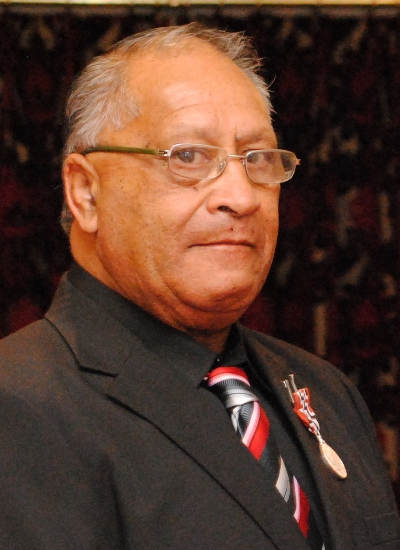
- Harawira in 2012
- Born: 13 March 1946; Paroa, New Zealand
- Died: 9 January 2017 (aged 70)
- Occupation(s): Sawmill worker, activist

Joseph 'Hohepa' Harawira QSM (13 March 1946 – 9 January 2017) was a Māori kaumātua (elder) and environmental campaigner in New Zealand, prominent for raising issues of dioxin poisoning around Whakatāne in the Eastern Bay of Plenty.

== Early life and career ==
Harawira was a member of the Ngāti Awa and Ngāi Te Rangi tribes, which are prominent in Whakatāne. He spent most of his early life in that town. His parents and grandparents were involved in the Ringatū and Rātana churches.

Harawira worked at Tasman pulp and paper mill (Kawerau), Kinleith mill (Tokoroa) and then at Whakatane sawmill for 29 years, where like many other workers, he was exposed to pentachlorophenol (PCP), used in timber processing in New Zealand at that time.

Harawira retired from the mill when his health declined in 1982, and suffered near-total paralysis by the 1990s, which he said was due to toxic chemical poisoning from his years at the mill. Many other workers at the mill suffered similar health effects, suffering similar symptoms of fatigue, depression, respiratory problems, heart and liver disease, and high levels of cancer.

== Political activity ==
Harawira spent the last 30 years of his life seeking recognition for workers at the Whakatane Sawmill harmed by workplace chemical poisoning. He was spokesperson for Sawmill Workers Against Poisons (SWAP), producing a survey of (former) sawmill workers and families that led directly to action, including specialised health services and a clinic.

SWAP campaigned to have all remaining contaminated sites cleaned up, including 25 dumps in the Whakatane area. For many decades, the mill had dumped contaminated sawdust, bark, scrap timber, and chemicals in and around Whakatane and the Rangitaiki Plains, including the Kopeopeo Canal, which was sometimes called New Zealand's most polluted waterway. Kopeopeo Canal and other constructed waterways were designed to drain low-lying farmlands across the Rangitaiki Plains. Between 1950 and 1989, these canals received point-source discharge containing waste from the timber treatment mill, where PCP had been used as a wood preservative. The PCP was contaminated with dioxins and furans (PCDD/PCDFs), resulting in dioxin-contaminated sediment. Remediation efforts on the canal received international recognition in 2019.

In the 2012 Queen's Birthday and Diamond Jubilee Honours, Harawira was awarded the Queen's Service Medal, for services to sawmillers' health.

MP Te Ururoa Flavell, co-leader of the Māori Party, said Harawira's "ground-breaking campaign resulted in significant transformative outcomes for the people and land of Ngāti Awa. The research was pivotal in creating a remedial project to clean the whenua and waterways."

== Death ==
Harawira died on 9 January 2017. His tangi was held at Pūpūāruhe Marae in Whakatāne.
