= Tiny Hill (rugby union) =

New Zealand rugby union player (1927–2019)

Tiny Hill MBE
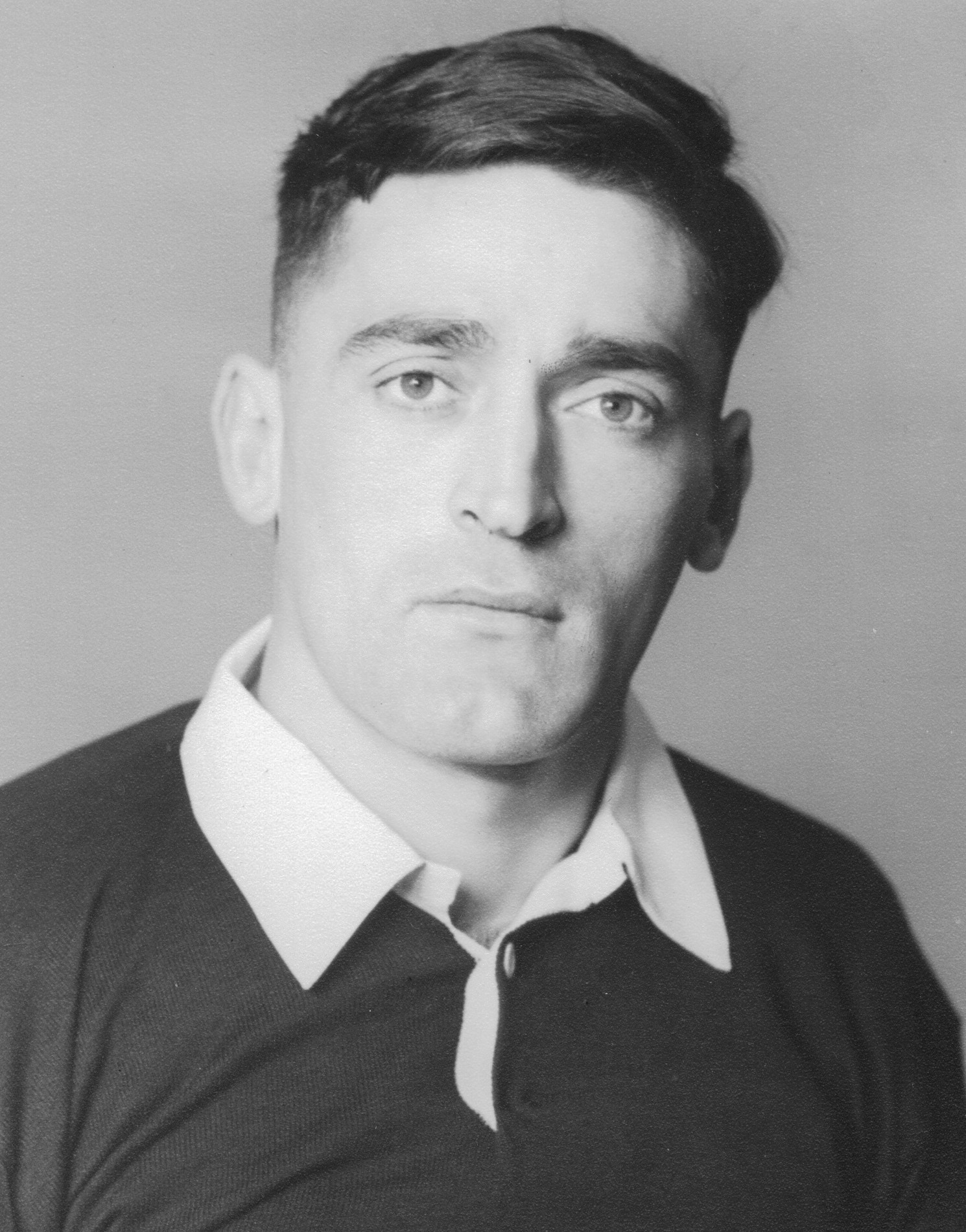
- Born: Stanley Frank Hill; 9 April 1927 New Plymouth, New Zealand
- Died: 2 October 2019 (aged 92) Rolleston, New Zealand
- Height: 1.88 m (6 ft 2 in)
- Weight: 94 kg (207 lb)
- School: Okato Primary School
- Notable relative(s): Stan Hill (son); John Hill (son)

Rugby union career
- Position(s): Lock; Flanker
Provincial / State sides
Years	Team	Apps	(Points)
- Canterbury
-	Counties		
International career
Years	Team	Apps	(Points)
1955–59	New Zealand	11	(0)

Stanley Frank "Tiny" Hill MBE (9 April 1927 – 2 October 2019) was a New Zealand international rugby union player and selector. A lock and flanker, Hill represented Canterbury and Counties at a provincial level, and was a member of the New Zealand national side, the All Blacks, from 1955 to 1959. He played 19 matches for the All Blacks, two of which were as captain, including 11 internationals. After retiring as a player, Hill served as New Zealand Army and Canterbury selector, and as an All Black selector from 1981 to 1986.

In the 1996 New Year Honours, Hill was appointed a Member of the Order of the British Empire, for services to rugby. His sons Stan and John were both New Zealand basketball representatives.

Hill died in Rolleston on 2 October 2019.
