= Traci Houpapa =

New Zealand businesswoman

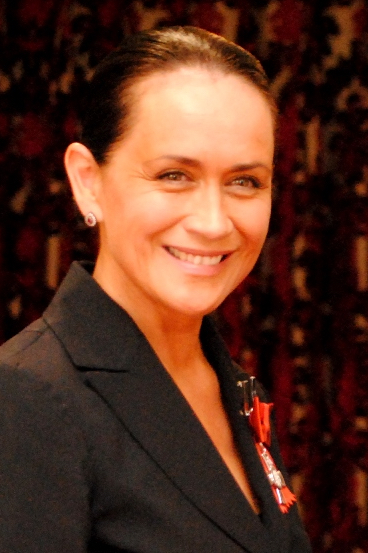
Houpapa in 2012

Tracey Tania Houpapa MNZM JP (born 1965 or 1966), commonly known as Traci Houpapa, is a company director and business advisor. She is a New Zealand Māori.

== Early life ==
Houpapa grew up as one of four children on a sheep and beef farm in the King Country, in New Zealand's North Island. Her mother was a German Yugoslav and her father was Maori, of Waikato, Ngāti Maniapoto, Taranaki and Ngāti Tūwharetoa. Her father was active in campaigns to return Lands and Survey-operated properties back into Maori management in the 1980s.

On finishing high school, she was advised to gain experience in a wide range of occupations, She subsequently worked as a tour guide on the Whanganui River, a rousey in a shearing gang, a lab technician and a social worker. She also worked on a project setting up kohanga reo centres around the North Island. Houpapa then returned to the King Country and worked for her community Maori Trust Board as operations manager and then as chief executive.

Houpapa completed a master's in business administration at Massey University.

== Career ==
Houpapa has served on the board of Landcorp since May 2010, and was appointed Chair in May 2015. Houpapa also holds governance roles on the Waikato River Authority, Victoria University of Wellington, Ngā Pae O Te Māramatanga Centre for Research Excellence, Diverse NZ Inc, the Rural Broadband Initiative (RBI) National Advisory Committee and Strada Corporation, the Ontario Teachers’ Pension Plan, NZ Forestry Investments Limited, Pengxin NZ Farm Management Limited, Ururangi Limited and the Asia NZ Foundation.

=== Honours and awards ===
In the 2012 Queen's Birthday Honours, Houpapa was appointed a Member of the New Zealand Order of Merit, for services to business and Māori. In 2015, she won the Board and Management award at the New Zealand Women of Influence Awards. She has also been named on Westpac's New Zealand Women Powerbrokers list.

In 2016, Houpapa was awarded the Massey University Distinguished Alumni Service Award for services to New Zealand agribusiness and Māori, and also named as one of the BBC's 100 Most Influential Women in the World.
