= Dale Copeland =

New Zealand collage and assemblage artist (born 1943)

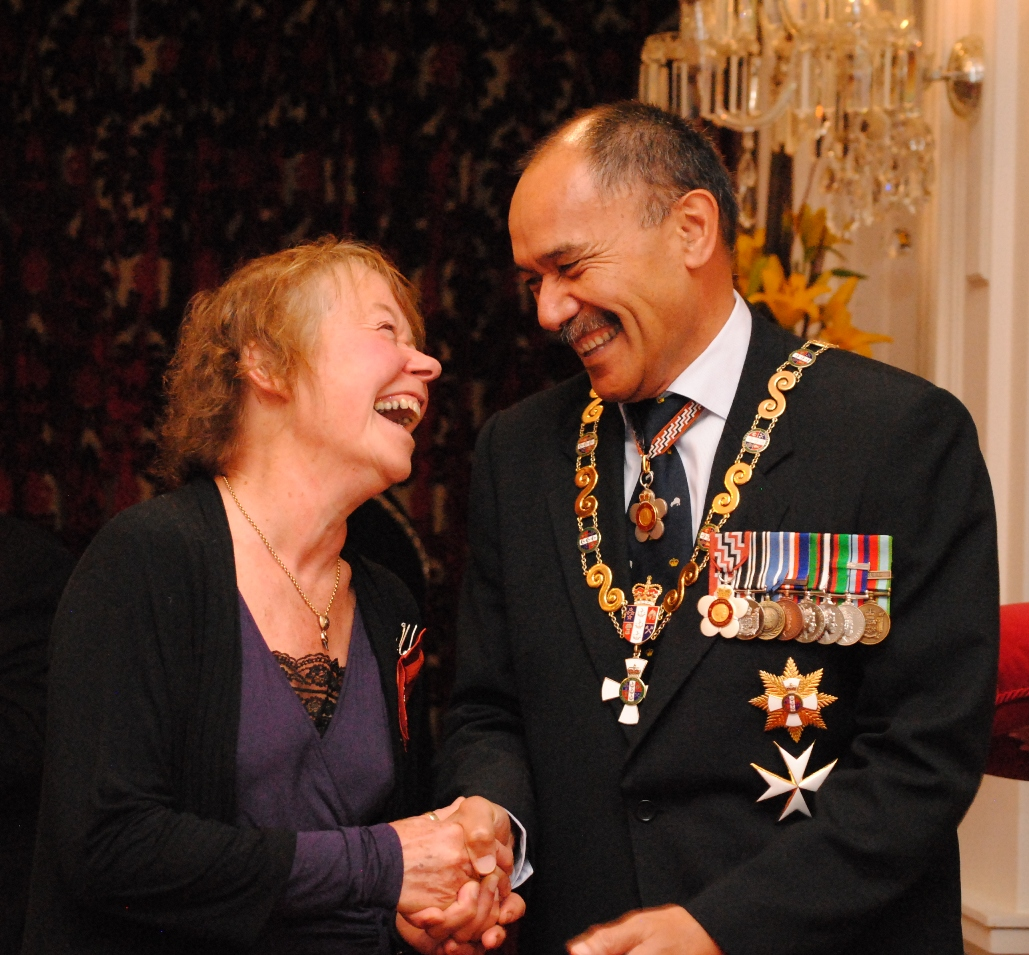
Copeland in 2012, after her investiture as a Member of the New Zealand Order of Merit by the governor-general, Sir Jerry Mateparae

Dale Devereux Copeland MNZM (born 1943) is a New Zealand collage and assemblage artist. Copeland's work is about "society's detritus" and reworking "discarded things" into art. Copeland, who is also a community art organiser, is called "the backbone of the Taranaki art scene" by the Taranaki Daily News.

== Career ==
Copeland lives and works in Taranaki. She has a studio filled with found objects connected to her house near Ōkato. Copeland is part of an artist collective in rural Taranaki called Virtual TART, and which shows their work online through the Virtual TART site.

In the late 1990s, Copeland created the International Collage Exhibition and Exchange art show. In 2009, Copeland earned three Special Recognition Merit Awards for her art in the 8th Annual Summer All Media Juried Online International Art Exhibition.

In 2011, Copeland and other Taranaki artists exhibited their work at the Lincoln Center in New York. The next year, Copeland was appointed a Member of the New Zealand Order of Merit in the 2012 Queen's Birthday and Diamond Jubilee Honours, for services to the arts.

In 2013, Copeland released a book, Complex Numbers in Graphs, which is about her exploration of chaos theory in a visual medium. She and eleven artists showed their work in Paris in November 2014. In 2015, she was involved with the restoration of a naval mine which was installed as a public sculpture in Port Taranaki.

Copeland, and several other Taranaki artists, showed their work in Paris in May 2017. The exhibition was called Art Taranaki – de retour à Paris and shown at Gallery 59, Rue de Rivoli. In 2019 she and 3 others took an exhibition of Taranaki Art to Terre Verte Gallery in Cornwall, UK. At her grading in November 2023, at the age of 80, she became a Taekwon-Do Master.
