= Philip Aldridge =

New Zealand actor and chief executive

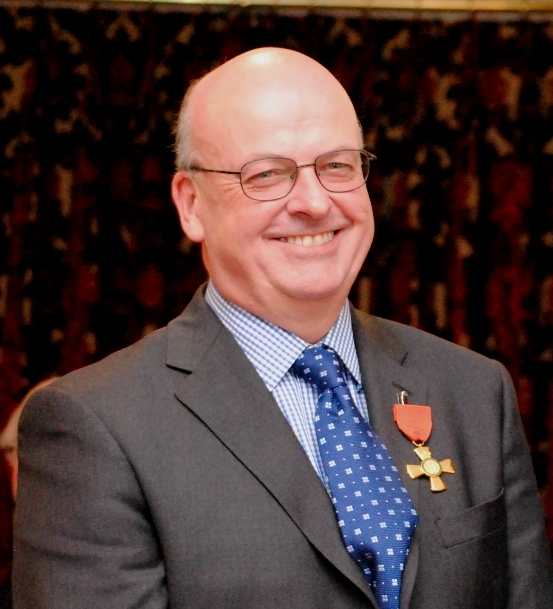
Aldridge in 2012, after his investiture as an Officer of the New Zealand Order of Merit

Philip Brendan Aldridge ONZM (born 28 February 1960) is a British-born actor and arts leader who has been the chief executive of New Zealand's Arts Centre te Matatiki Toi Ora in Christchurch since mid-2018. Prior to this he was the chief executive of New Zealand's largest theatre company, the Court Theatre in Christchurch, and chairman of the Bank of New Zealand in Canterbury. In the 2012 Queen's Birthday and Diamond Jubilee Honours, Aldridge was appointed an Officer of the New Zealand Order of Merit, for services to theatre, particularly after the 2011 Christchurch earthquake. He was born in St Andrews, Scotland and raised in Yorkshire and Nottinghamshire in England.
