= Ruahine Albert =

New Zealand anti-domestic violence activist

Ruahine Albert QSM JP
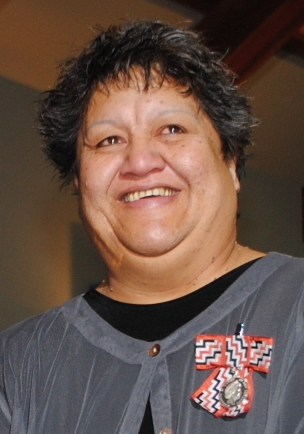
- Albert in 2012
- Other name: Roni Albert
- Known for: Anti-Domestic violence activism

Ruahine "Roni" Albert is a New Zealand anti-domestic violence activist of Ngāti Maniapoto, Ngāti Tūwharetoa and Tainui descent.

Albert was co-founder (with Ariana Simpson) of Te Whakaruruhau in Hamilton, the first Māori Women's Refuge, in 1987. Still active with Te Whakaruruhau, Albert also has had roles with Child, Youth and Family, Work and Income and Housing New Zealand.

Now a multi-site refuge, Te Whakaruruhau operates a whānau facility which works closely with the Te Ao Marama Unit at Waikeria Prison and focuses on reintegration of offenders and reduction of reoffending.

The whānau facility was opened by MP Tariana Turia.

In 2000, Albert and national Women's Refuge head, Merepeka Raukawa-Tait clashed with Māori Affairs Minister Parekura Horomia over the perceived down-playing of domestic violence in the Māori community.

Albert was awarded the Queen's Service Medal for services to Māori and the community in the 2012 Queen's Birthday and Diamond Jubilee Honours.
