= Gabrielle Huria =

New Zealand Māori leader

Gabrielle Huria MNZM
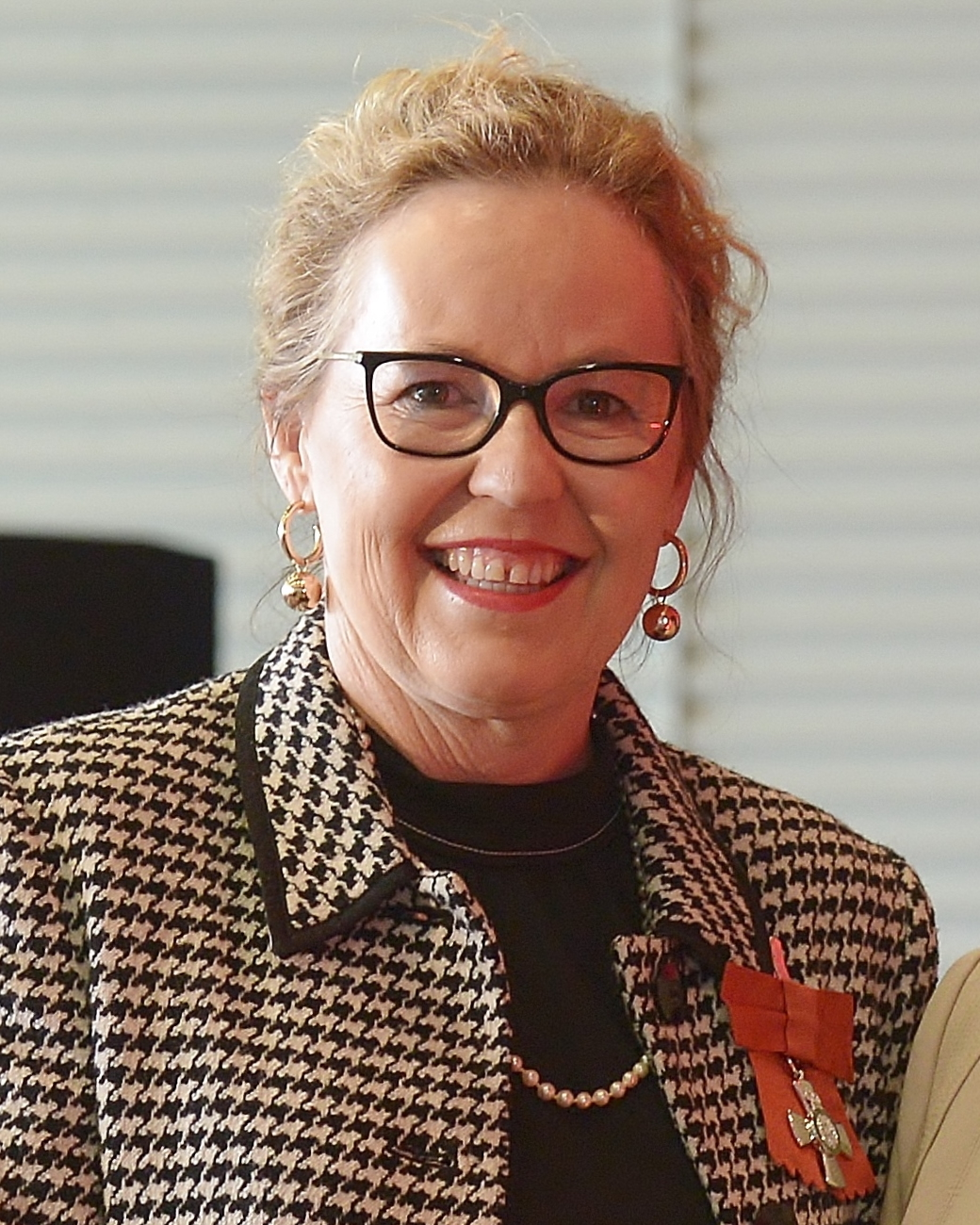
- Huria in 2018
- Born: 1962 (age 63–64); Christchurch, New Zealand

Gabrielle Ann Huria MNZM (born 1962) is a New Zealand Māori leader working in freshwater management and mental health. In 2018 Huria was appointed a Member of the New Zealand Order of Merit for services to Māori and governance.

== Early life and education ==
Huria was born in Christchurch in 1962. She is Māori and affiliates to Ngāi Tahu. Huria attended Our Lady of the Assumption school in Hoon Hay in Christchurch, and the St Vincent de Paul School (known as the Rigi) and Erskine College in Wellington. She has qualifications in journalism and television production from Waiariki Polytechnic and Christchurch Polytechnic. Huria completed a Bachelor of Arts in sociology at the University of Canterbury.

== Career ==
Huria worked in television as a journalist, researcher and scriptwriter, and then as a producer for television and radio. Huria spent five years as the Auckland-based producer for the children's radio show Ears, where she developed a group of Māori writers to contribute new stories to the programme. She has also published several children's books. Huria worked in public relations, and was public affairs manager for Te Runanga o Ngāi Tahu, before becoming chief executive and chair of Ngāi Tahu Communications. Huria was responsible for the communications strategy for Ngāi Tahu during their treaty negotiations and during the post-settlement period, and created and edited a magazine Te Karaka. Following the 2011 Christchurch earthquakes, Huria established a trust, to rebuild and insulate homes, and to develop infrastructure to allow tribal members to occupy tribal land in Tuahiwi.

Huria has also been a member of the Ngāi Tahu Research Centre Advisory Board, and is the Ngāi Tahu Mission Leader for Sisters of Mercy New Zealand.

Huria was Deputy Chair of the Canterbury District Health Board, and chief executive of Te Kura Taka Pini, a Ngāi Tahu company working in South Island freshwater management. She was a trustee of the Māia Health Foundation, which works in mental health. In 2014 Huria was appointed as the inaugural chair of Emerge Aotearoa, a provider of mental health services for Māori and Pacific people.

In 2021, Huria was appointed a member of the Three Waters Working Group on Representation, Governance and Accountability, to provide a "Treaty partner perspective". Huria was responsible for commissioning an exhibition by photographer Anne Noble, Unutai e! Unutai e!, and also appeared in the exhibition. The exhibition was commissioned as evidence in Ngai Tahu's High Court Freshwater Statement of Claim, a case filed in 2020. The exhibition opened in Dunedin Public Art Gallery from May to October 2025 and then moved to Christchurch Art Gallery, where it is scheduled to run until April 2026.

Canterbury University Press published a collection of Huria's poetry, Pakiaka, in 2025. It has been described as "part family chronicle and part a settling of accounts – a depiction of being Ngāi Tahu in a modern world", and "slim but powerful". In September 2025 Huria appeared at the WORD Christchurch literary festival with ecologist Mike Joy, where she read one of her poems and talked about the practice of mahinga kai (traditional food gathering), her memories of childhood eeling, swimming and floundering, and how her work is motivated by the desire that her children and grandchildren should have the same opportunities.

== Honours and awards ==
In the 2018 Queen's Birthday Honours, Huria was appointed a Member of the New Zealand Order of Merit for services to Māori and governance. In 2019 she was a finalist in the Board and management section of the Women of Influence Awards.

== Personal life ==
Huria's sister is company director Jane Huria.
