= Coastal Taranaki School =

Location
- Carthew Street; PO Box 8 Ōkato; Taranaki; 39.1930°S 173.8813°E

Information
- Type: State coed, years 0–13
- Motto: Māori: Ma te whanau, te tamaiti e puawai By the whole community, the child will blossom.
- Established: 2005
- Ministry of Education Institution no.: 551
- Principal: Scott Walden
- Enrolment: 240 (July 2026)
- Socio-economic decile: 7
- Website: www.coastaltaranaki.school.nz

Coastal Taranaki School is a rural area school located in Ōkato, Taranaki, New Zealand. Established in 2005, the school formed through the merger of a number of small primary schools and Okato College. As an area school, Coastal Taranaki School caters for the educational needs of students year 0 to 13.
