= Jane Huria =

New Zealand company director

Jane Huria CNZM
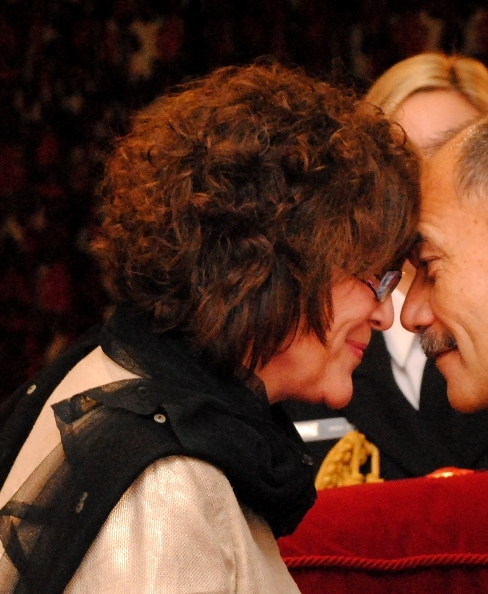
- Awards: Companion of the New Zealand Order of Merit, Distinguished Fellow of the Institute of Directors

Jane Christine Huria CNZM is a New Zealand company director. She is Professor of Practice – Business and Governance at the University of Canterbury. In 2012 she was appointed a Companion of the New Zealand Order of Merit for services to corporate governance, and in 2024 she was elected as a Distinguished Fellow of the Institute of Directors.

== Career ==
Huria is Māori, and affiliates to Ngāi Tahu, and Ngāi Tūāhuriri. She studied law at Victoria University of Wellington, and worked as insurance broker and in financial markets, before establishing a market research business. Huria is Professor of Practice – Business and Governance in the School of Business at the University of Canterbury, and runs a governance consultancy.

Huria has held governance roles on a large number of boards across the public and private sector, including the Accident Compensation Corporation, Winter Games New Zealand, the Court Theatre, the New Zealand Red Cross Earthquake Commission, Ngāi Tahu Holdings Corporation Limited, Naylor Love, Pegasus Health, Te Kaha Project Delivery Ltd, Nurse Maude, ScreenSouth, Paenga Kupenga, Canterbury Cricket Trust, and Heritage Farms New Zealand Limited. Huria was chair of the Advisory Board of the Canterbury Earthquake Appeal Trust, chair of He Oranga Pounamu, and deputy chair of the Electoral Commission.

Huria teaches governance for the Institute of Directors, and has also been a faculty member of the World Bank’s Global Corporate Governance Forum.

== Honours and awards ==
In the 2012 Queen's Birthday and Diamond Jubilee Honours she was appointed a Companion of the New Zealand Order of Merit for services to corporate governance. In 2024 Huria was elected a Distinguished Fellow of the Institute of Directors.

== Personal life ==
Huria's sister is Ngāi Tahu leader Gabrielle Huria.
