= Angiostoma =

Scientific classification
- Domain: Eukaryota
- Kingdom: Animalia
- Phylum: Nematoda
- Class: Chromadorea
- Family: Angiostomatidae
- Genus: Angiostoma; Dujardin, 1845

Genus of roundworms

Angiostoma is a genus of parasitic nematodes in the family Angiostomatidae.

== Species ==
Species in the genus Angiostoma include:

Parasitic species of turtles:

- Angiostoma carettae (Bursey & Manire, 2006) - from lungs of Caretta caretta, Florida.

Parasitic species of amphibians:

- Angiostoma aspersae (Yildirimhan, 2011) - Found in the stomach of Luschan's salamander carcasses
- Angiostoma lamotheargumedoi (Falcón-Ordaz, Mendoza-Garfias, Windfield-Pérez, Parra-Olea & de León, 2008) - from salamander Pseudoeurycea mixteca, Mexico.
- Angiostoma onychodactyla (Bursey& Goldberg, 2000) - from the Japanese Clawed Salamander Onychodactylus japonicus
- Angiostoma plethodontis (Chitwood, 1923) - from Plethodon cinereus and from Plethodon richmondi, Virginia, USA.

Parasitic species of gastropods (slugs and snails):

- Angiostoma asamati (Spiridonov, 1985) - from Turbomilax ferganus.
- Angiostoma aspersae (Morand, 1986) - from Cornu aspersum.
- Angiostoma coloaense (Van Luc, Spiridonov & Wilson, 2005 )- from Cyclophorus sp.
- Angiostoma dentifera (Mengert, 1953) - from Limax cinereoniger.
- Angiostoma kimmeriensis (Korol & Spiridonov, 1991) - from Oxychilus deilus.
- Angiostoma coloaense (P. V. Luc, S. E. Spiridonov & M. J. Wilson, 2005) - from Vietnam.
- Angiostoma limacis (Dujardin, 1845) - type species, from Arion ater.
- Angiostoma margaretae (Dujardin, 1845) - from Milax gagates, Britain and South Africa.
- Angiostoma milacis (Ivanova & Wilson, 2009) - from Milacidae and from Agriolimacidae, British Isles.
- Angiostoma schizoglossae (Morand & Barker, 1995) - from Schizoglossa novoseelandica, New Zealand.
- Angiostoma spiridonovi (Morand, 1992) - from Limax flavus.
- Angiostoma stammeri (Mengert, 1953) - from Limax cinereoniger and from Limax maximus.
- Angiostoma zonitidis (Ivanova & Wilson, 2009) - from Zonitidae, British Isles.
