= Parco regionale del Delta del Po =

Parco regionale del Delta del Po may refer to:

- Parco regionale del Delta del Po, Emilia-Romagna: the park along the Po Delta in Emilia-Romagna;
- Parco regionale del Delta del Po, Veneto (Italiano): the park along the Po Delta in Veneto.

Not to be confused with Po Delta Interregional Park, which is the sum of the two, still to be established.
