= Three Sisters and Elephant Rock =

Geological formation of New Zealand'

Coordinates: 38°49′07″S 174°34′52″E

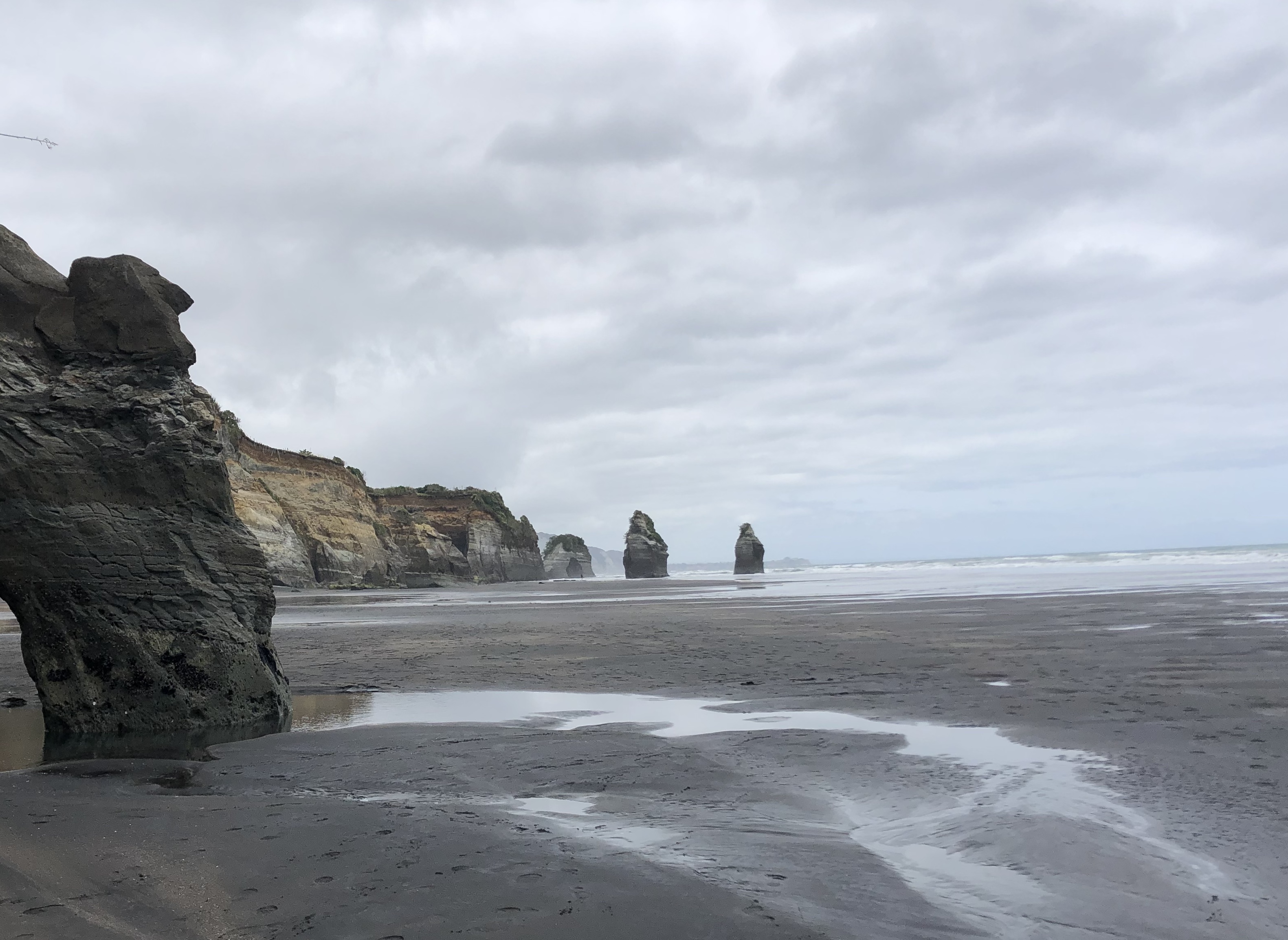
An image of the Three Sisters

The Three Sisters and Elephant Rock are seastacks at the mouth of the Tongapōrutu River in Tongapōrutu, North Taranaki, New Zealand. They are accessible by foot from a carpark at low tide.

Erosion is slowly claiming the 25-metre (82 ft) formations. At the beginning of the 21st century there were four "sisters", but only two remain as of 2024. In 2016, Elephant Rock also lost the "trunk" which gave it its resemblance to the animal of the same name, leaving a single natural arch. Losses to the main landmass in the area have occasionally produced extra "sisters", such as one that appeared in 2013.
