= Angiostoma schizoglossae =

Scientific classification
- Kingdom: Animalia
- Phylum: Nematoda
- Class: Chromadorea
- Order: Rhabditida
- Family: Angiostomatidae
- Genus: Angiostoma
- Species: A. schizoglossae

Binomial name
- Angiostoma schizoglossae Morand & Barker, 1995

Species of roundworm

Angiostoma schizoglossae is a species of parasitic nematodes.

This species was described from the gastropod Schizoglossa novoseelandica from New Zealand in 1995.
