= Angiostoma carettae =

Scientific classification
- Domain: Eukaryota
- Kingdom: Animalia
- Phylum: Nematoda
- Class: Chromadorea
- Family: Angiostomatidae
- Genus: Angiostoma
- Species: A. carettae

Binomial name
- Angiostoma carettae Bursey & Manire, 2006

Species of roundworm

Angiostoma carettae is the first species of nematodes known to inhabit turtles. Its specific name comes from its presence in loggerhead sea turtles (Caretta caretta).

Each of the loggerheads found to contain Angiostoma carettae had other debilitating disorders. For this reason, it is hard to pinpoint the exact effect of the nematodes. Even so, the nematodes caused histologic lesions in the respiratory tract.

Ingestion of pelagic mollusks has been hypothesized as the mode of A. carettae ingestion, but has not been proven.
