= Angiostoma limacis =

Scientific classification
- Domain: Eukaryota
- Kingdom: Animalia
- Phylum: Nematoda
- Class: Chromadorea
- Family: Angiostomatidae
- Genus: Angiostoma
- Species: A. limacis

Binomial name
- Angiostoma limacis (Dujardin, 1845)

Species of roundworm

Angiostoma limacis is a species of parasitic nematode.

== Hosts ==
- Limax maximus
