= Uruti =

Settlement in Taranaki, New Zealand

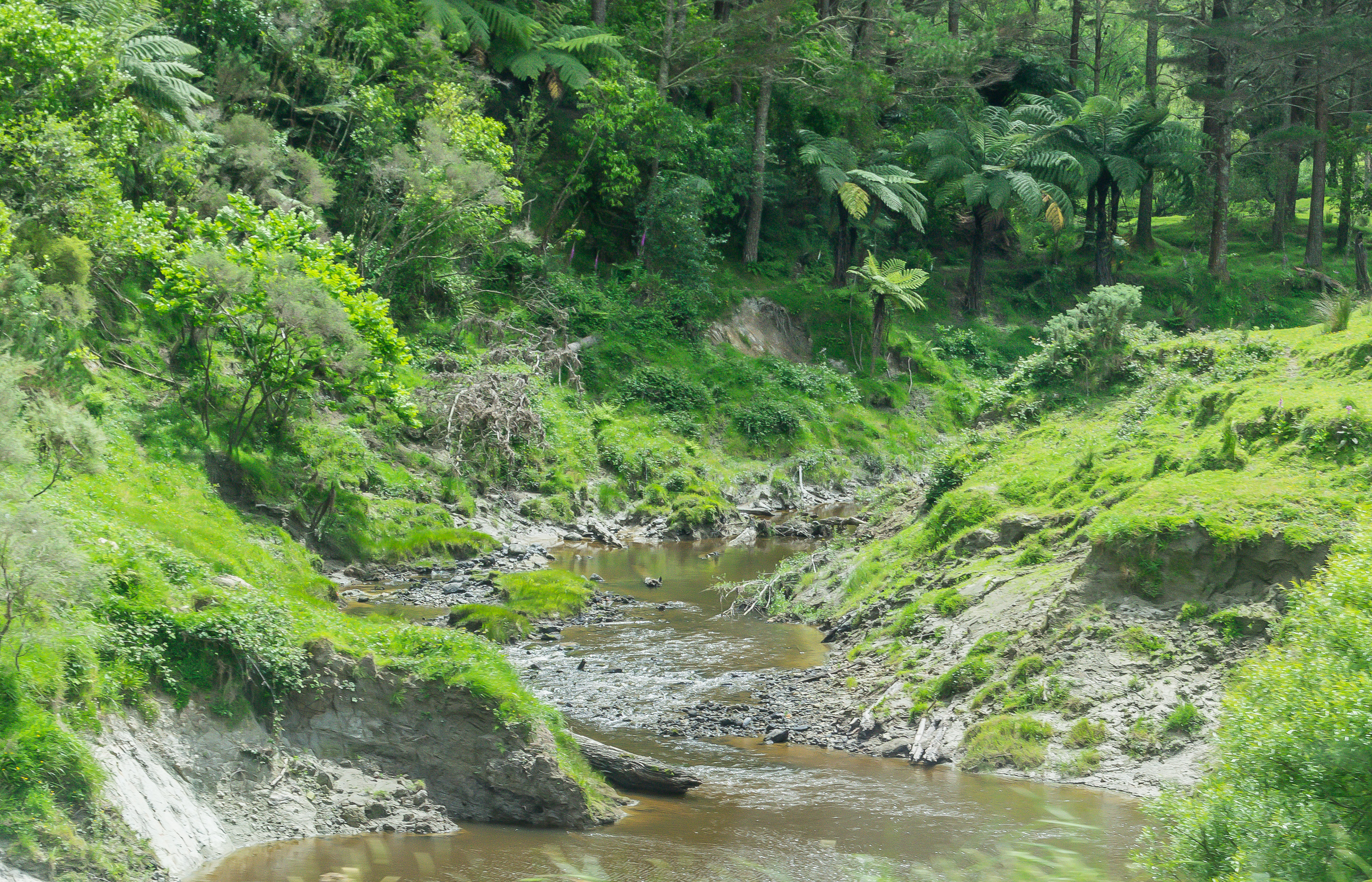
- The Uturi Stream, which runs next to the township
- Interactive map of Uruti
- Coordinates: 38°56′40″S 174°31′42″E
- Country: New Zealand
- Region: Taranaki Region
- Territorial authority: New Plymouth District
- Ward: North General Ward; Te Purutanga Mauri Pūmanawa Māori Ward
- Community: Clifton Community
- Electorates: Taranaki-King Country; Te Tai Hauāuru (Māori)

Government
  - Territorial Authority: New Plymouth District Council
  - Regional council: Taranaki Regional Council
  - Mayor of New Plymouth: Max Brough
  - Taranaki-King Country MP: Barbara Kuriger
  - Te Tai Hauāuru MP: Debbie Ngarewa-Packer

Area
  - Total: 271.07 km^{2} (104.66 sq mi)

Population (2023 Census)
  - Total: 135
  - Density: 0.498/km^{2} (1.29/sq mi)

Uruti is a locality in northern Taranaki, in the North Island of New Zealand. It is located on State Highway 3, north-east of Mimi and south-west of Ahititi. The Uruti Stream meets the Mimi River at this point. The river flows past the settlement into the North Taranaki Bight.

A district nurse was appointed to serve the backblocks of the Uruti Valley in 1909. This was the first district nursing service in New Zealand.

The Uruti tunnel links the Uruti Valley with the main highway. It was completed in 1923 and is the longest and most unstable tunnel in Taranaki.

The 1984 film Vigil was filmed at Uruti. Much of the 2003 film The Last Samurai was filmed in the Uruti Valley, with Mount Taranaki/Egmont standing in for Mount Fuji.

== Demographics ==
Uruti locality covers 271.07 km^{2} (104.66 sq mi). The locality is part of the Mount Messenger statistical area.

Historical population for Uruti locality
Year	Pop.	±% p.a.
2006	126	—
2013	132	+0.67%
2018	120	−1.89%
2023	135	+2.38%

Uruti had a population of 135 in the 2023 New Zealand census, an increase of 15 people (12.5%) since the 2018 census, and an increase of 3 people (2.3%) since the 2013 census. There were 75 males and 60 females in 51 dwellings. The median age was 37.4 years (compared with 38.1 years nationally). There were 33 people (24.4%) aged under 15 years, 24 (17.8%) aged 15 to 29, 63 (46.7%) aged 30 to 64, and 15 (11.1%) aged 65 or older.

People could identify as more than one ethnicity. The results were 88.9% European (Pākehā); 22.2% Māori; 2.2% Asian; 2.2% Middle Eastern, Latin American and African New Zealanders (MELAA); and 13.3% other, which includes people giving their ethnicity as "New Zealander". English was spoken by 100.0%, Māori by 4.4%, and other languages by 4.4%. The percentage of people born overseas was 6.7, compared with 28.8% nationally.

The only religious affiliation given was 15.6% Christian. People who answered that they had no religion were 66.7%, and 17.8% of people did not answer the census question.

Of those at least 15 years old, 18 (17.6%) people had a bachelor's or higher degree, 57 (55.9%) had a post-high school certificate or diploma, and 27 (26.5%) people exclusively held high school qualifications. The median income was $40,700, compared with $41,500 nationally. 9 people (8.8%) earned over $100,000 compared to 12.1% nationally. The employment status of those at least 15 was 63 (61.8%) full-time, 15 (14.7%) part-time, and 3 (2.9%) unemployed.

=== Mount Messenger statistical area ===
Mount Messenger statistical area, which includes the localities of Mimi, Uruti, Ahititi and Tongapōrutu, covers 934.28 km^{2} (360.73 sq mi) and had an estimated population of 1,000 as of June 2025, with a population density of 1.1 people per km^{2}.

Historical population for Mount Messenger
Year	Pop.	±% p.a.
2006	756	—
2013	822	+1.20%
2018	864	+1.00%
2023	972	+2.38%

Mount Messenger had a population of 972 in the 2023 New Zealand census, an increase of 108 people (12.5%) since the 2018 census, and an increase of 150 people (18.2%) since the 2013 census. There were 504 males, 462 females, and 3 people of other genders in 384 dwellings. 2.2% of people identified as LGBTIQ+. The median age was 43.2 years (compared with 38.1 years nationally). There were 216 people (22.2%) aged under 15 years, 135 (13.9%) aged 15 to 29, 450 (46.3%) aged 30 to 64, and 174 (17.9%) aged 65 or older.

People could identify as more than one ethnicity. The results were 88.9% European (Pākehā), 23.1% Māori, 0.6% Pasifika, 1.2% Asian, and 4.9% other, which includes people giving their ethnicity as "New Zealander". English was spoken by 98.5%, Māori by 3.1%, and other languages by 3.1%. No language could be spoken by 1.2% (e.g. too young to talk). New Zealand Sign Language was known by 0.3%. The percentage of people born overseas was 9.9, compared with 28.8% nationally.

Religious affiliations were 24.1% Christian, 0.3% Hindu, 0.6% Māori religious beliefs, and 0.3% New Age. People who answered that they had no religion were 64.8%, and 9.6% of people did not answer the census question.

Of those at least 15 years old, 120 (15.9%) people had a bachelor's or higher degree, 441 (58.3%) had a post-high school certificate or diploma, and 192 (25.4%) people exclusively held high school qualifications. The median income was $36,100, compared with $41,500 nationally. 57 people (7.5%) earned over $100,000 compared to 12.1% nationally. The employment status of those at least 15 was 372 (49.2%) full-time, 135 (17.9%) part-time, and 18 (2.4%) unemployed.

== Education ==
Uruti School is a coeducational full primary (years 1–8) school with a roll of 9 students as of July 2026. The school celebrated its centennial in 1998.
