= Ahititi =

- Interactive map of Ahititi
- Coordinates: 38°51′41″S 174°36′18″E
- Country: New Zealand
- Region: Taranaki
- District: New Plymouth District
- Ward: North General Ward; Te Purutanga Mauri Pūmanawa Māori Ward
- Community: Clifton Community
- Electorates: Taranaki-King Country; Te Tai Hauāuru (Māori)

Government
  - Territorial Authority: New Plymouth District Council
  - Regional council: Taranaki Regional Council
  - Mayor of New Plymouth: Max Brough
  - Taranaki-King Country MP: Barbara Kuriger
  - Te Tai Hauāuru MP: Debbie Ngarewa-Packer

Area
  - Total: 434.43 km^{2} (167.73 sq mi)

Population (2023 Census)
  - Total: 210
  - Density: 0.48/km^{2} (1.3/sq mi)

Ahititi is a locality in Taranaki, New Zealand. State Highway 3 runs through it. Mokau is 23 km to the north, Mimi is 26 km to the south-west, and Kotare is 16 km to the east. The Tongaporutu River flows through the area and into the North Taranaki Bight at Tongaporutu to the northwest. The name means "fire for cooking" (ahi) "muttonbirds" (titi).

== Demographics ==
Ahititi locality covers 434.43 km^{2} (167.73 sq mi). The locality is part of the Mount Messenger statistical area.

Historical population
Year	Pop.	±% p.a.
2006	204	—
2013	180	−1.77%
2018	159	−2.45%
2023	210	+5.72%

Ahititi locality had a population of 210 in the 2023 New Zealand census, an increase of 51 people (32.1%) since the 2018 census, and an increase of 30 people (16.7%) since the 2013 census. There were 111 males and 99 females in 99 dwellings. The median age was 50.7 years (compared with 38.1 years nationally). There were 36 people (17.1%) aged under 15 years, 30 (14.3%) aged 15 to 29, 102 (48.6%) aged 30 to 64, and 42 (20.0%) aged 65 or older.

People could identify as more than one ethnicity. The results were 91.4% European (Pākehā); 24.3% Māori; 1.4% Pasifika; 1.4% Middle Eastern, Latin American and African New Zealanders (MELAA); and 2.9% other, which includes people giving their ethnicity as "New Zealander". English was spoken by 98.6%, Māori by 2.9%, and other languages by 1.4%. No language could be spoken by 1.4% (e.g. too young to talk). The percentage of people born overseas was 7.1, compared with 28.8% nationally.

Religious affiliations were 37.1% Christian, and 1.4% Māori religious beliefs. People who answered that they had no religion were 54.3%, and 7.1% of people did not answer the census question.

Of those at least 15 years old, 24 (13.8%) people had a bachelor's or higher degree, 105 (60.3%) had a post-high school certificate or diploma, and 54 (31.0%) people exclusively held high school qualifications. The median income was $27,400, compared with $41,500 nationally. 12 people (6.9%) earned over $100,000 compared to 12.1% nationally. The employment status of those at least 15 was 72 (41.4%) full-time, 33 (19.0%) part-time, and 3 (1.7%) unemployed.

== Education ==
Ahititi School is a coeducational full primary (years 1–8) school with a roll of 14 as of July 2025. The school celebrated its 100th jubilee in 1997.
