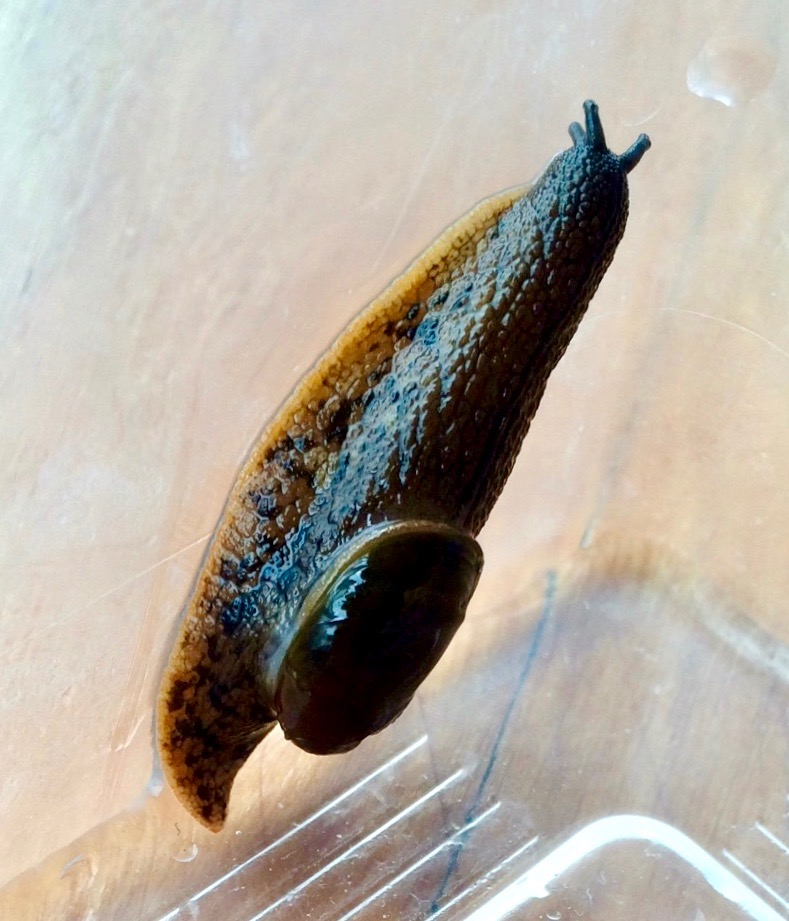

Scientific classification
- Kingdom: Animalia
- Phylum: Mollusca
- Class: Gastropoda
- Order: Stylommatophora
- Family: Rhytididae
- Genus: Schizoglossa
- Species: S. novoseelandica

Binomial name
- Schizoglossa novoseelandica (Pfeiffer, 1862)

Synonyms
- Daudebardia novoseelandica Pfeiffer, 1862

= Schizoglossa novoseelandica =

Species of gastropod

Schizoglossa novoseelandica is a predatory species of air-breathing land slug or semi-slug, a terrestrial gastropod mollusc in the family Rhytididae. It is the type species of the genus Schizoglossa and is found only in New Zealand. The survival of this species is not threatened; it is not listed in the 2009 IUCN Red List nor is it in the 2005 New Zealand Threat Classification System lists.

== Subspecies ==
- Schizoglossa novoseelandica novoseelandica - on the New Zealand mainland.
- Schizoglossa novoseelandica barrierensis - found only on Great Barrier Island.

== Distribution ==
Schizoglossa novoseelandica novoseelandica is found on the North Island, New Zealand. Localities include Kakepuku mountain in the Waikato, Wainuiomata in the Wellington Region, Toko near Stratford, Cape Egmont, and Mount Messenger Conservation Area in Taranaki, Bushy Park and Hunterville in the Manawatū-Whanganui Region, Whangarei Heads in Northland, Ohingaiti, the Kaimai Ranges between Waikato and the Bay of Plenty, and the Mount Tongariro/Lake Taupō area.

Subfossil and very large shells (that were believed to belong to this species in 1913) were found in cave near Tahora and in Mangaone Cave near Nūhaka in Hawke's Bay Region.

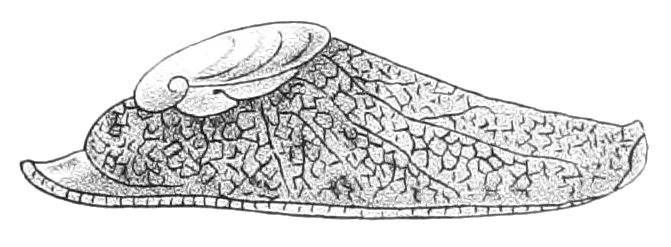
Lateral view with retracted tentacles.

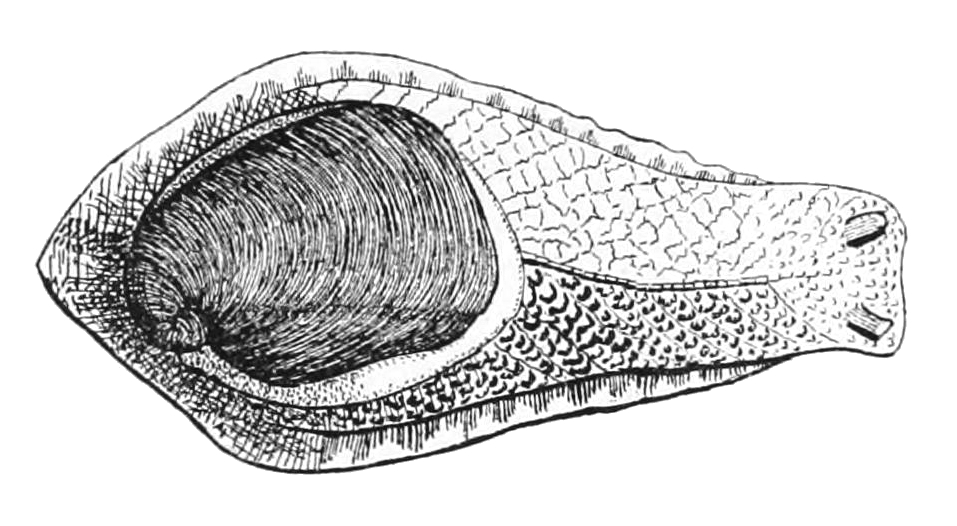
Dorsal view of an alcohol preserved specimen (tentacles are larger in living specimens.)

== Shell description ==
Schizoglossa novoseelandica was originally described under the name Daudebardia novoseelandica by the German malacologist Ludwig Karl Georg Pfeiffer in 1862. He described the species based only the shell, which the German geologist Ferdinand von Hochstetter had brought back from New Zealand. The specific name novoseelandica is combination of the Latin word novus which means "new" and part of the German word Neuseeland which means New Zealand. The shell of the type specimen is stored in the Imperial Natural History Museum in Vienna.

Pfeiffers's original text (the type description) is very short: first is shell characteristics in Latin and then incorrect statement in German that it is the largest Daudebardia. A mistake happened because he was not able to examine different anatomical characteristics. It reads as follows:

T. imperforata, depressissima, ambitu ovalis, solidula, striis incrementi distinctis et lineis impressis radiantibus sculpta, fulva; spira minima, ⅛ longitudinis occupans; anfr. 2½, ultimus latere subcompressus; columella superne crasse callosa; apertura oblonga, intus submargaritacea. — Long. 10, diam. 7, alt. 2½ mm. Obwohl über den Bewohner dieser in den Urwäldern der mittleren Waikatogegend gesammelten Gehäuse mir keine Notiz vorliegt, so ist es doch nach dem ganzen Habitus und allen Charakteren nicht zu bezweifeln, dass die Schnecke der Gattung Daudebardia angehört, deren grösste bis jetzt bekannte Art sie ist.

The shell is rudimentary, auriform, thin, opaque, oval, increasing irregularly. The protoconch is first smooth, then spirally grooved. The sculpture of the adult volution is somewhat irregularly and rather distantly spirally grooved, the grooves crossed by coarse irregular and arcuate growth wrinkles. The shell is colorless, glossy chestnut shaded to greenish yellow at the margin. The spire is tinged with reddish brown. The color of the ventral side of the shell is nacreous, gleaming white and purple. The columellar lip is white. The periostracum is thin and polished. The color of periostracum is greenish-olive. The spire is quite flat. The protoconch is of 1 1/2 rapidly increasing whorls. The protoconch is flatly convex, one-seventh of the total length, regular, well defined. The shell has two whorls. The adult half whorl is the most rapidly increasing, fingernail-shaped, descending at the suture. The suture is deep. The peristome is thin and sharp, the upper lip very little curved. The outer lip is regularly rounded. The basal lip is nearly straight. The columella is very short, subvertical. Inner lip is thickly callous, terminating below in 1 or several minute tubercles, and spreading broadly above over the parietal wall. The inside of the aperture is strongly callous in the centre and towards the columella, where there is a well-impressed muscular scar of the columellar muscle. A second elongated muscle-scar is situated on the inner side of the basal lip.

The width of the shell of the type specimen is 10 mm, the height of the shell is 2.5 mm, the diameter is 7 mm. The width of the shell in a very large specimen is 32.5 mm, the height of the shell is 6 mm, the diameter is 19.5 mm.

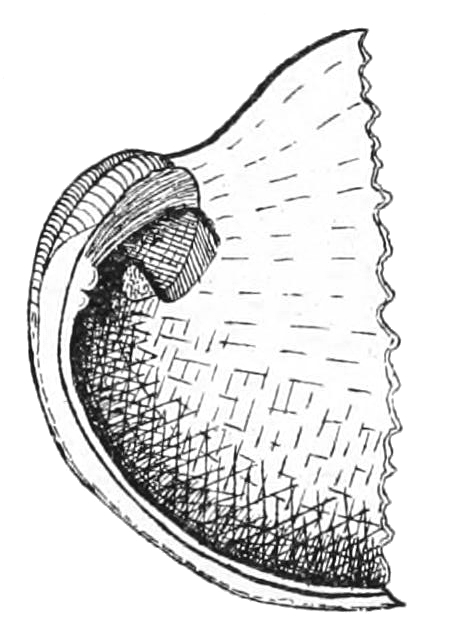
A ventral view of the posterior part of the shell of Schizoglossa novoseelandica.

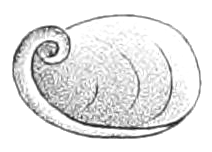
Ventral view of the shell.

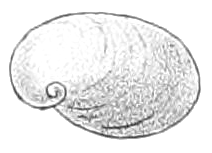
Dorsal view of the shell.

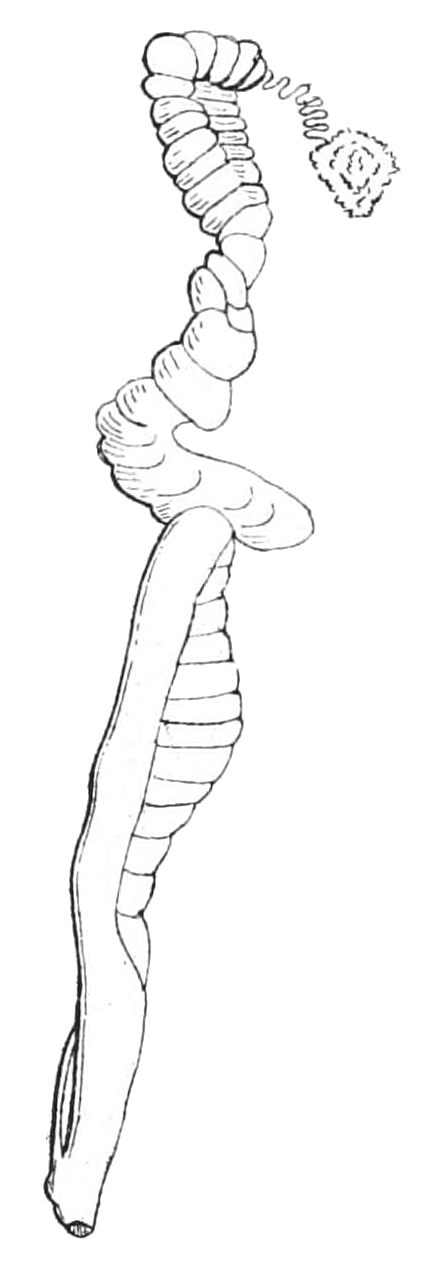
Drawing of the reproductive system of Schizoglossa novoseelandica. It consists of: the hermaphrodite gland (= ovotestis), hermaphroditic duct, albumen gland, spermoviduct, oviduct, vagina, vas deferens (= sperm-duct), penis, genital pore. (See notes on the image.)

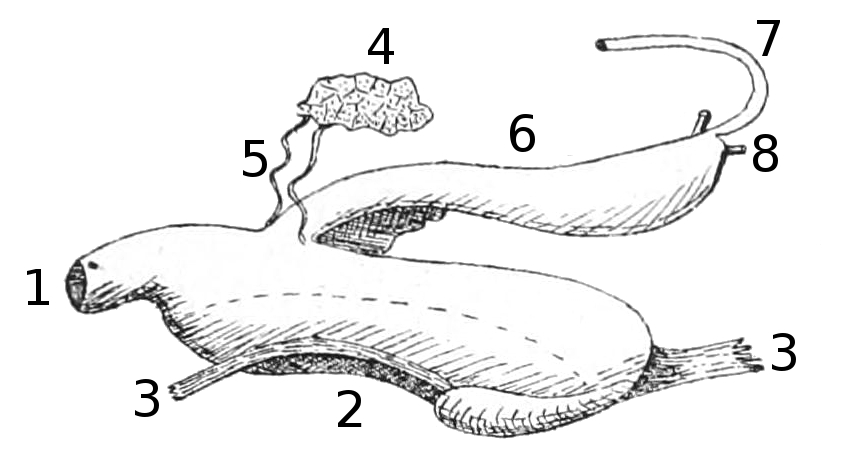
Drawing of the digestive system of Schizoglossa novoseelandica. 1-2 - buccal mass, 1 - mouth, 2 - pharynx, 3 - retractor muscles of the pharynx, 4 - salivary glands, 5 - salivary ducts, 6 - oesophagus and stomach, 7 - intestine, 8 - hepatic ducts.

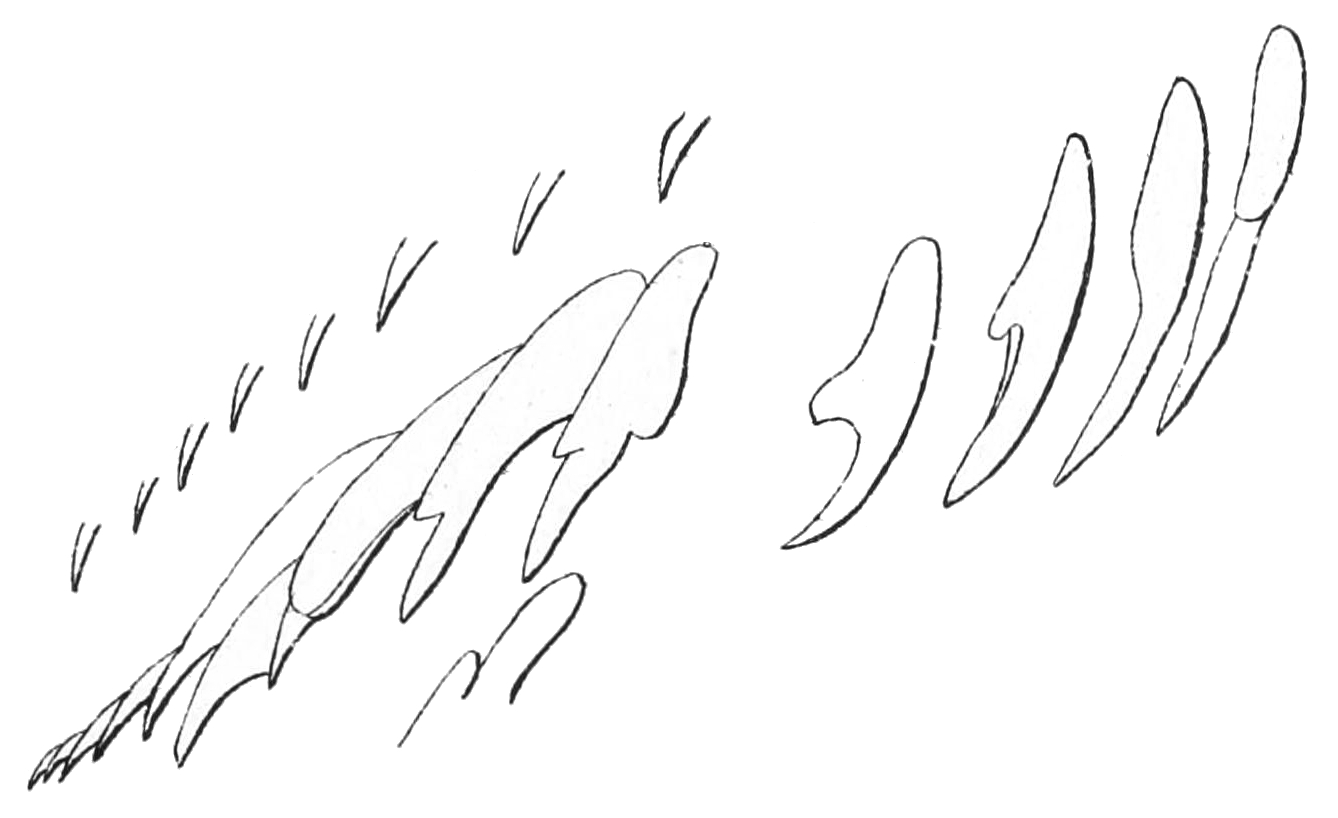
Drawing of inner half row from the radula of Schizoglossa novoseelandica.

== Anatomy ==
The length of specimen contracted in alcohol is 20 mm, the height and breadth are 9 mm. Behind the shell, which is situated upon the hinder half of the body, the tail projects slightly. The end of the tail is flat, has no caudal mucous pit, and is bluntly pointed. The margin of the foot is produced into a slight flange. A pair of grooves running along the median line from the mantle to the muzzle define a row of small tubercles. Right and left, between this median line and the foot-edge, 2 indistinct grooves can be traced from the mantle to the lips. Posterior to these, the surface is divided into tubercles by small irregular grooves meandering outwards and downwards. The mantle has an even margin, with 2 small lappets on the under-side; the right proceeds forward from a little behind the respiratory pore (pneumostome), extends to almost one-third of the length of the mantle-margin, and forms a narrow fold; the left is minute, simply a rudiment, and in some specimens it is difficult to detect. The sole of the foot is without a defined median area. Two small labial tentacles are present. The color is reddish-brown, splashed with black, and darkest above. The mantle and sole are ashy-yellow.

The radula is 12 mm long and 3 mm in width. It has 61 rows of denticles (tiny teeth). There is sometimes a rudimentary tooth in the centre of some rows. The number of lateral teeth varying from 24 to 28. Charles Hedley described radula formula with 26 teeth: 24 + 0 + 24 × 61 while Robert C. Murdoch described radula formula with usual 26 teeth: 26 + 0 + 26 × 61. The innermost four teeth are small and slender, then they increase rapidly in size. The 25th tooth is rather smaller than the 24th, and the 26th is minute and occasionally absent.

The digestive system contains enormous buccal mass in size and muscular development. The pharynx (the largest part of buccal mass) is so large, occupying almost the whole length of the visceral cavity. The esophagus enters to the buccal cavity dorsally in the anterior fourth. The stomach forms a simple elongated sac.

The reproductive system is remarkable for extreme reduction of male organs and the absence of receptaculum seminis (spermatheca). The male organ (penis) is a short tube, and exhibits little difference from the vas deferens, except that it is slightly wider; the latter is a short tube not sharply marked off from the verge. The albumen gland is large.

== Ecology ==
=== Habitat ===
Schizoglossa novoseelandica usually lives in rainforest under logs, but it can hunt its prey a few metres above the ground in the trees.

=== Feeding habits ===
Schizoglossa novoseelandica is carnivorous and predatory, preferring snails Otoconcha dimidiata from the subfamily Otoconchinae, family Charopidae and also feeding on earthworms and on its own species (cannibalism).

=== Life cycle ===
The egg is white, hard-shelled, oval and coarsely granular. The size of the eggs of Schizoglossa novoseelandica ranges from 4 × 3 mm to 4.5 × 3.75 mm. Eggs are laid in August, and they are found principally under a good thickness of decaying fern-leaves, in little heaps of from 6 to as many as 14.

=== Parasites ===
A parasitic nematode Angiostoma schizoglossae Morand & Barker, 1995 was described from Schizoglossa novoseelandica in 1995.
