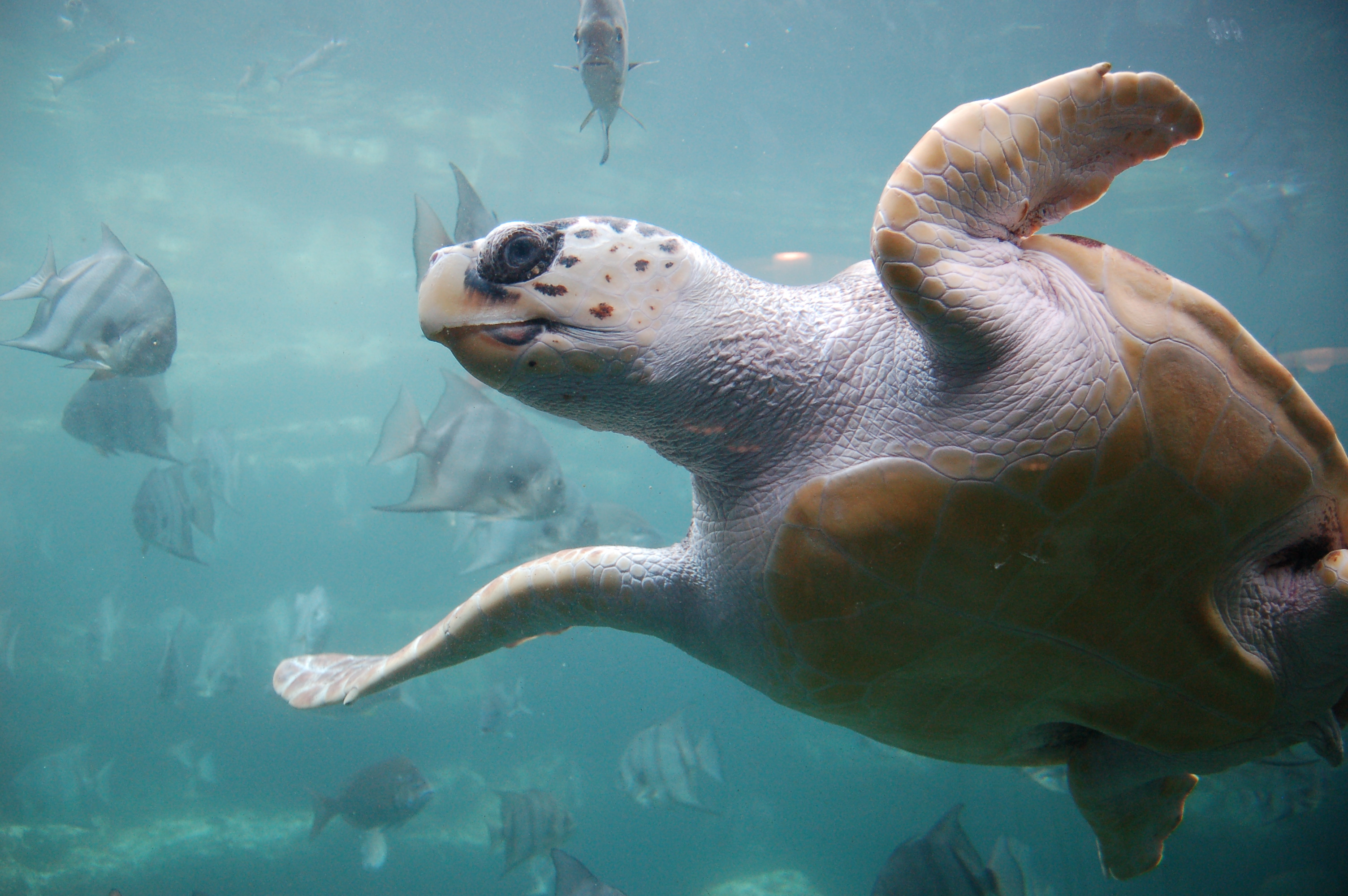

Conservation status
- Vulnerable (IUCN 3.1)
- CITES Appendix I

Scientific classification
- Kingdom: Animalia
- Phylum: Chordata
- Class: Reptilia
- Order: Testudines
- Suborder: Cryptodira
- Family: Cheloniidae
- Subfamily: Carettinae
- Genus: Caretta; Rafinesque, 1814
- Species: C. caretta

Binomial name
- Caretta caretta (Linnaeus, 1758)
- Loggerhead sea turtle range according to the Food and Agriculture Organization Species synonymy: Testudo caretta Linnaeus, 1758; Testudo cephalo Schneider, 1783; Testudo nasicornis Lacépède, 1788; Testudo caouana Lacépède, 1788; Chelone caretta — Brongniart, 1805; Chelonia caouanna Schweigger, 1812; Caretta nasuta Rafinesque, 1814; Chelonia cavanna Oken, 1816; Caretta atra Merrem, 1820; Caretta cephalo — Merrem, 1820; Caretta nasicornis — Merrem, 1820; Chelonia caretta — Bory de Saint-Vincent, 1828; Testudo corianna Gray, 1831; Chelonia pelasgorum Valenciennes in Bory de Saint-Vincent, 1833; Chelonia cephalo — Gray, 1829; Chelonia (Caretta) cephalo — Lesson in Bélanger, 1834; Chelonia caouanna — A.M.C. Duméril & Bibron, 1835; Chelonia (Thalassochelys) caouana — Fitzinger, 1836; Chelonia (Thalassochelys) atra — Fitzinger, 1836; Thalassochelys caretta — Bonaparte, 1838; Chelonia (Caouanna) cephalo — Cocteau in Cocteau & Bibron in de la Sagra, 1838; Halichelys atra — Fitzinger, 1843; Caounana caretta — Gray, 1844; Caouana elongata Gray, 1844; Thalassochelys caouana — Agassiz, 1857; Thalassochelys corticata Girard, 1858; Chelonia corticata — Strauch, 1862; Thalassochelys elongata Strauch, 1862; Thalassochelys caouana Nardo, 1864; Eremonia elongata — Gray, 1873; Caretta caretta — Stejneger, 1873; Thalassochelys cephalo — Barbour & Cole, 1906; Caretta caretta caretta — Mertens & L. Müller, 1928; Caretta gigas Deraniyagala, 1933; Caretta caretta gigas — Deraniyagala, 1939; Caretta caretta tarapacana Caldwell, 1962; Chelonia cahuano — Tamayo, 1962; Caretta careta [sic] Tamayo, 1962 (ex errore); Genus synonymy: Caretta Rafinesque, 1814; Caretta (Thalassochelys) Fitzinger, 1835; Thalassochelys Bonaparte, 1838; Caouana Cocteau in de la Sagra, 1838; Halichelys Fitzinger, 1843; Eremonia Gray, 1873; ?Pliochelys Portis, 1890; ?Proganosaurus Portis, 1890

= Loggerhead sea turtle =

Loggerhead sea turtle Temporal range: 40–0 Ma Eocene - Recent

Species of marine reptile distributed throughout the world

The loggerhead sea turtle (Caretta caretta), loggerhead turtle or loggerhead, is a species of sea turtle distributed throughout the world. It is a marine reptile, belonging to the family Cheloniidae. The average loggerhead measures around 90 cm (35 in) in carapace length when fully grown. The adult loggerhead sea turtle weighs approximately 135 kg (298 lb), with the largest specimens weighing about 200 kg (440 lb). The skin ranges from yellow to brown in color, and the shell is typically reddish brown. No external differences in sex are seen until the turtle becomes an adult, the most obvious difference being that the adult males have thicker tails and shorter plastrons (lower shells) than the females.

The loggerhead sea turtle is found in the Atlantic, Pacific, and Indian Oceans, as well as the Mediterranean Sea. It spends most of its life in saltwater and estuarine habitats, with females briefly coming ashore to lay eggs. The loggerhead sea turtle has a low reproductive rate; females lay an average of four egg clutches and then become quiescent, producing no eggs for two to three years. The loggerhead reaches sexual maturity within 17–33 years and has a lifespan of 47–67 years.

The loggerhead sea turtle is omnivorous, feeding mainly on bottom-dwelling invertebrates. Its large and powerful jaws serve as an effective tool for dismantling its prey. Young loggerheads are exploited by numerous predators; the eggs are especially vulnerable to terrestrial organisms. Once the turtles reach adulthood, their formidable size limits predation to large marine animals, such as large sharks.

The loggerhead sea turtle is considered a vulnerable species by the International Union for Conservation of Nature. In total, nine distinct population segments are under the protection of the Endangered Species Act of 1973, with four population segments classified as "threatened" and five classified as "endangered". Commercial international trade of loggerheads or derived products is prohibited by CITES Appendix I. Untended fishing gear is responsible for many loggerhead deaths. The greatest threat is loss of nesting habitat due to coastal development, predation of nests, and human disturbances (such as coastal lighting and housing developments) that cause disorientations during the emergence of hatchlings. Turtles may also suffocate if they are trapped in fishing trawls. Turtle excluder devices have been implemented in efforts to reduce mortality by providing an escape route for the turtles. Loss of suitable nesting beaches and the introduction of exotic predators have also taken a toll on loggerhead populations. Efforts to restore their numbers will require international cooperation, since the turtles roam vast areas of ocean and critical nesting beaches are scattered across several countries.

== Taxonomy ==
Carl Linnaeus gave the loggerhead its first binomial name, Testudo caretta, in 1758. Thirty-five other names emerged over the following two centuries, with the combination Caretta caretta first introduced in 1873 by Leonhard Stejneger. The English common name "loggerhead" refers to the animal's large head. The loggerhead sea turtle belongs to the family Cheloniidae, which includes all extant sea turtles except the leatherback sea turtle. The subspecific classification of the loggerhead sea turtle is debated, but most authors consider it a single polymorphic species. Molecular genetics has confirmed hybridization of the loggerhead sea turtle with the Kemp's ridley sea turtle, hawksbill sea turtle, and green sea turtles. The extent of natural hybridization is not yet determined; however, second-generation hybrids have been reported, suggesting some hybrids are fertile.

=== Evolution ===
Although evidence is lacking, modern sea turtles probably descended from a single common ancestor during the Cretaceous period. Like all other sea turtles except the leatherback, loggerheads are members of the ancient family Cheloniidae, and appeared about 40 million years ago. Of the six species of living Cheloniidae, loggerheads are more closely related to the Kemp's ridley sea turtle, olive ridley sea turtle, and the hawksbill turtle than they are to the flatback turtle and the green turtle.

Around three million years ago, during the Pliocene epoch, Central America emerged from the sea, effectively cutting off currents between the Atlantic and Indo-Pacific Oceans. The rerouting of ocean currents led to climatic changes as the Earth entered a glacial cycle. Cold water upwelling around the Cape of Good Hope and reduction in water temperature at Cape Horn formed coldwater barriers to migrating turtles. The result was a complete isolation of the Atlantic and Pacific populations of loggerheads. During the most recent ice age, the beaches of southeastern North America were too cold for sea turtle eggs. As the Earth began to warm, loggerheads moved farther north, colonizing the northern beaches. Because of this, turtles nesting between North Carolina and northern Florida represent a different genetic population from those in southern Florida.

The distinct populations of loggerheads have unique characteristics and genetic differences. For example, Mediterranean loggerheads are smaller, on average, than Atlantic Ocean loggerheads. North Atlantic and Mediterranean loggerhead sea turtles are descendants of colonizing loggerheads from Tongaland, South Africa. South African loggerhead genes are still present in these populations today.

== Description ==
3d models of the skull (left) and skeleton (right)

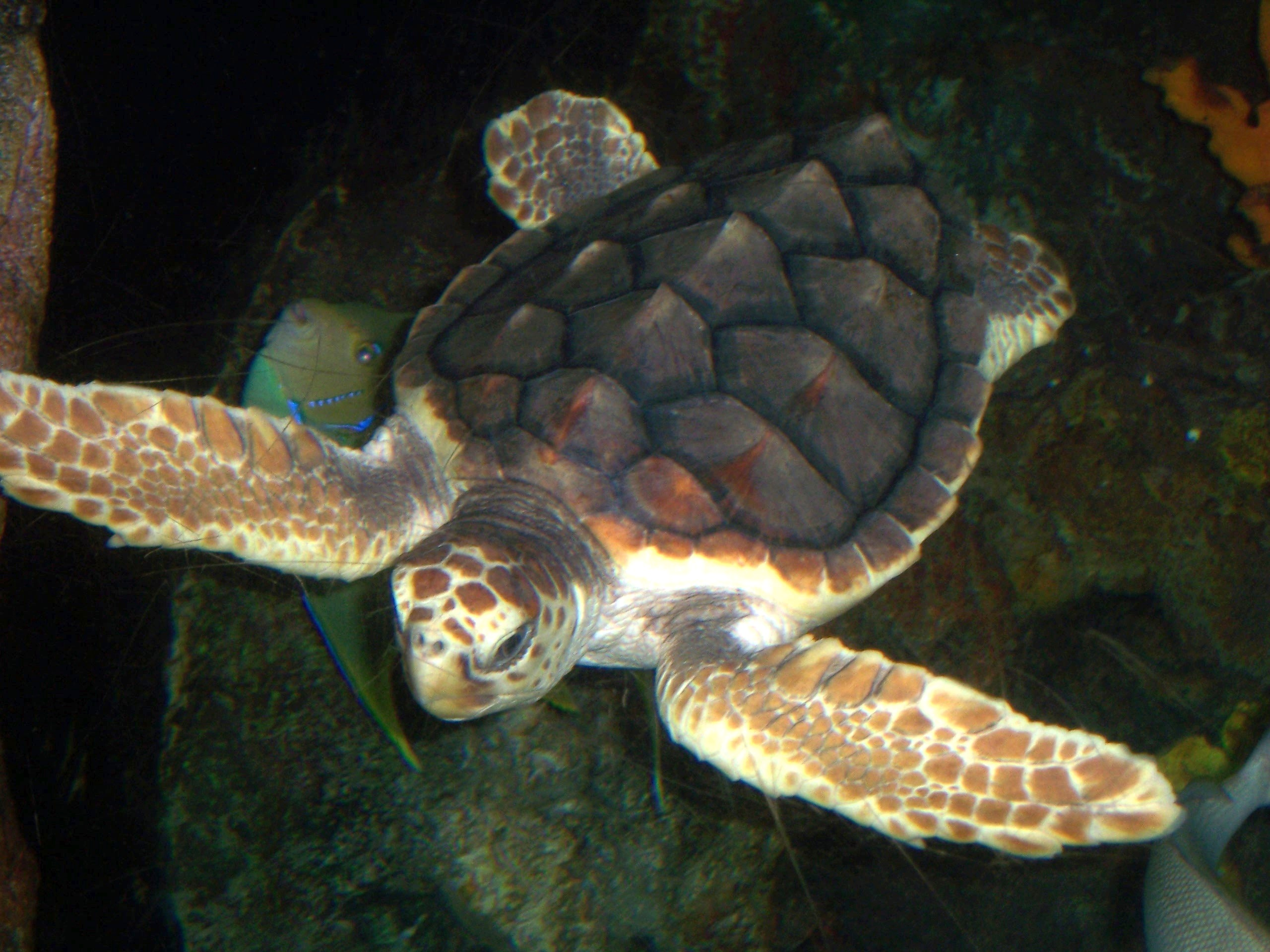
The carapace is reddish brown; five vertebral scutes run down the midline, bordered by five pairs of costal scutes

The loggerhead sea turtle is the world's largest hard-shelled turtle, slightly larger at average and maximum mature weights than the green sea turtle and the Galapagos tortoise. It is also the world's second largest extant turtle after the leatherback sea turtle. Adults have an approximate weight range of 80 to 200 kg (180 to 440 lb), averaging around 135 kg (298 lb), and a straight-line carapace length range of 70 to 95 cm (28 to 37 in). The maximum reported weight is 545 kg (1,202 lb) and the maximum (presumed total) length is 213 cm (84 in). The head and carapace (upper shell) range from a yellow-orange to a reddish brown, while the plastron (underside) is typically pale yellow. The turtle's neck and sides are brown on the tops and yellow on the sides and bottom.

The turtle's shell is divided into two sections: carapace and plastron. The carapace is further divided into large plates, or scutes. Typically, 11 or 12 pairs of marginal scutes rim the carapace. Five vertebral scutes run down the carapace's midline, while five pairs of costal scutes border them. The nuchal scute is located at the base of the head. The carapace connects to the plastron by three pairs of inframarginal scutes forming the bridge of the shell. The plastron features paired gular, humeral, pectoral, abdominal, femoral, and anal scutes. The shell serves as external armor, although loggerhead sea turtles cannot retract their heads or flippers into their shells.

Adult males have much longer tails

Sexual dimorphism of the loggerhead sea turtle is only apparent in adults. Adult males have longer tails and claws than females. The males' plastrons are shorter than the females', presumably to accommodate the males' larger tails. The carapaces of males are wider and less domed than the females', and males typically have wider heads than females. The sex of juveniles and subadults cannot be determined through external anatomy, but can be observed through dissection, laparoscopy (an operation performed on the abdomen), histological examination (cell anatomy), and radioimmunological assays (immune study dealing with radiolabeling).

Closeup, at the Georgia Aquarium

Lachrymal glands located behind each eye allow the loggerhead to maintain osmotic balance by eliminating the excess salt obtained from ingesting ocean water. On land, the excretion of excess salt gives the false impression that the turtle is crying. The urea content is high in Caretta caretta tears.

The skull is most easily distinguished from other sea turtles by having maxillae that meet in the mid-line of the palate. The portion of skull behind the eyes is also relatively large and bulbous due to the extensive jaw muscles.

== Distribution ==
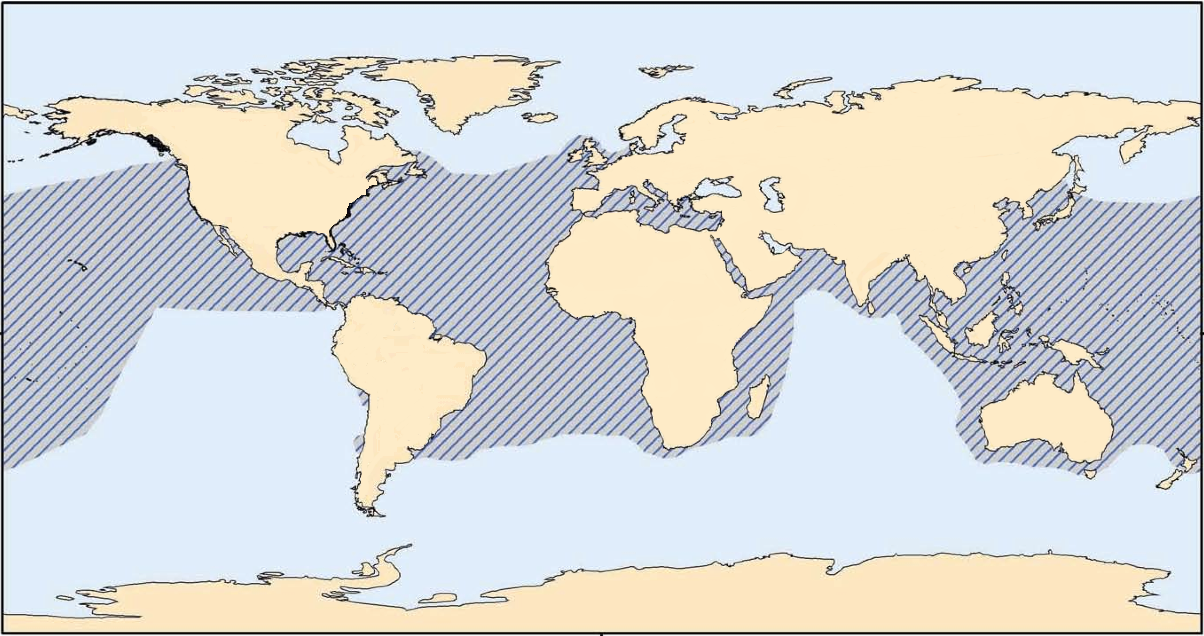
Range of the loggerhead sea turtle according to the National Oceanic and Atmospheric Administration

The loggerhead sea turtle has a cosmopolitan distribution, nesting over the broadest geographical range of any sea turtle. It inhabits the Atlantic, Indian, and Pacific Oceans and the Mediterranean Sea.

In the Atlantic Ocean, the greatest concentration of loggerheads is along the southeastern coast of North America and in the Gulf of Mexico. Very few loggerheads are found along the European and African coastlines. Florida is the most popular nesting site, with more than 67,000 nests built per year. Nesting extends as far north as Virginia, as far south as Brazil, and as far east as the Cape Verde Islands. The Cape Verde Islands are the only significant nesting site on the eastern side of the Atlantic. Loggerheads found in the Atlantic Ocean feed from Canada to Brazil.

In the Indian Ocean, loggerheads feed along the coastlines of Africa, the Arabian Peninsula, and in the Arabian Sea. Along the African coastline, loggerheads nest from Mozambique's Bazaruto Archipelago to South Africa's St Lucia estuary. The largest Indian Ocean nesting site is Oman, on the Arabian Peninsula, which hosts around 15,000 nests, giving it the second largest nesting population of loggerheads in the world. Western Australia is another notable nesting area, with 1,000–2,000 nests per year.

Pacific loggerheads live in temperate to tropical regions. They forage in the East China Sea, the southwestern Pacific, and along the Baja California Peninsula. Eastern Australia and Japan are the major nesting areas, with the Great Barrier Reef deemed an important nesting area. Pacific loggerheads occasionally nest in Vanuatu and Tokelau. Yakushima Island is the most important site, with three nesting grounds visited by 40% of all nearby loggerheads. After nesting, females often find homes in the East China Sea, while the Kuroshio Current Extension's Bifurcation region provides important juvenile foraging areas. Eastern Pacific populations are concentrated off the coast of Baja California, where upwelling provides rich feeding grounds for juvenile turtles and subadults. Nesting sites along the eastern Pacific Basin are rare. mtDNA sequence polymorphism analysis and tracking studies suggest 95% of the population along the coast of the Americas hatch on the Japanese Islands in the western Pacific. The turtles are transported by the prevailing currents across the full length of the northern Pacific, one of the longest migration routes of any marine animal. The return journey to the natal beaches in Japan has been long suspected, although the trip would cross unproductive clear water with few feeding opportunities. Evidence of a return journey came from an adult female loggerhead named Adelita, which in 1996, equipped with a satellite tracking device, made the 14,500 km (9,000 mi) trip from Mexico across the Pacific. Adelita was the first animal of any kind ever tracked across an ocean basin.

The Mediterranean Sea is a nursery for juveniles, as well as a common place for adults in the spring and summer months. Almost 45% of the Mediterranean juvenile population has migrated from the Atlantic. Loggerheads feed in the Alboran Sea and the Adriatic Sea, with tens of thousands of specimens (mainly sub-adult) seasonally present in the North-Eastern portion of the latter, above all in the area of the Po Delta. Greece is the most popular nesting site along the Mediterranean, with more than 3,000 nests per year. Zakynthos hosts the largest Mediterranean nesting with the second one being in Kyparissia Bay. Because of this, Greek authorities do not allow planes to take off or land at night in Zakynthos due to the nesting turtles. In addition to the Greek coast, the coastlines of Cyprus and Turkey are also common nesting sites.

One record of this turtle was made in Ireland when a specimen washed ashore on Ballyhealy Beach in County Wexford in 2013. Another records one specimen being washed up on a beach in County Donegal, Ireland, in 2019. They are not native to UK waters, but have been increasingly seen, most recently in 2026.

== Habitat ==
Loggerhead sea turtles spend most of their lives in the open ocean and in shallow coastal waters. They rarely come ashore besides the females' brief visits to construct nests and deposit eggs. Hatchling loggerhead turtles live in floating mats of Sargassum algae. Adults and juveniles live along the continental shelf as well as in shallow coastal estuaries. In the northwestern Atlantic Ocean, age plays a factor in habitat preference. Juveniles are more frequently found in shallow estuarine habitats with limited ocean access compared to non-nesting adults. Loggerheads occupy waters with surface temperatures ranging from 13.3–28 °C (56–82 °F) during non-nesting season. Temperatures from 27–28 °C (81–82 °F) are most suitable for nesting females.

Juvenile loggerheads share the Sargassum habitat with a variety of other organisms. The mats of Sargassum contain as many as 100 different species of animals on which the juveniles feed. Prey found in Sargassum mats may include barnacles, crab larvae, fish eggs, and hydrozoan colonies. Some prey, such as ants, flies, aphids, leafhoppers, and beetles, are carried by the wind to the mats. Marine mammals and commercial fishes, including tuna and mahi-mahi, also inhabit the Sargassum mats.

== Behavior ==
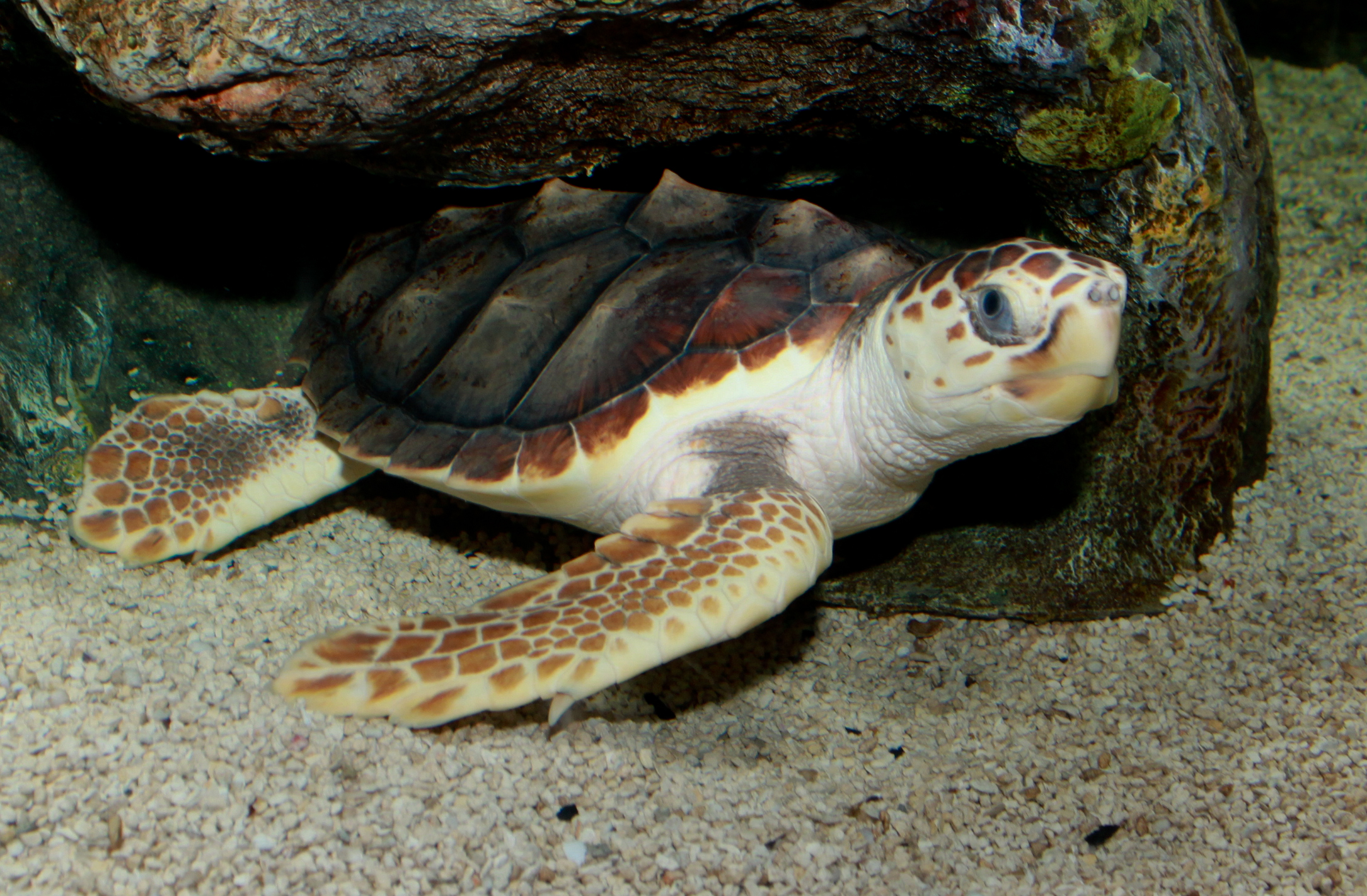
A resting loggerhead sea turtle

Loggerhead sea turtles observed in captivity and in the wild are most active during the day. In captivity, the loggerheads' daily activities are divided between swimming and resting on the bottom. While resting, they spread their forelimbs to about midstroke swimming position. They remain motionless with eyes open or half-shut and are easily alerted during this state. At night, captives sleep in the same position with their eyes tightly shut, and are slow to react. Loggerheads spend up to 85% of their day submerged, with males being the more active divers than females. The average duration of dives is 15–30 min, but they can stay submerged for more than ten hours, longer than any other air-breathing marine vertebrate. Juvenile loggerheads and adults differ in their swimming methods. A juvenile keeps its forelimbs pressed to the side of its carapace, and propels itself by kicking with its hind limbs. As the juvenile matures, its swimming method is progressively replaced with the adult's alternating-limb method. They depend entirely on this method of swimming by one year old.

Water temperature affects the sea turtle's metabolic rate. Lethargy is induced at temperatures between 13 and 15 °C (55 and 59 °F). The loggerhead takes on a floating, cold-stunned posture when temperatures drop to around 10 °C (50 °F). However, younger loggerheads are more resistant to cold and do not become stunned until temperatures drop below 9 °C (48 °F). The loggerheads' migration helps to prevent instances of cold-stunning. Higher water temperatures cause an increase in metabolism and heart rate. A loggerhead's body temperature increases in warmer waters more quickly than it decreases in colder water; their critical thermal maximum is currently unknown. In February 2015, a live loggerhead turtle was found floating in British Columbian waters of 10.5 °C (50.9 °F) with extensive algal growth on its carapace.

Female-female aggression, which is fairly rare in other marine vertebrates, is common among loggerheads. Ritualized aggression escalates from passive threat displays to combat. This conflict primarily occurs over access to feeding grounds. Escalation typically follows four steps. First, initial contact is stimulated by visual or tactile cues. Second, confrontation occurs, beginning with passive confrontations characterized by wide head-tail circling. They begin aggressive confrontation when one turtle ceases to circle and directly faces the other. Third, sparring occurs with turtles snapping at each other's jaws. The final stage, separation, is either mutual, with both turtles swimming away in opposite directions, or involves chasing one out of the immediate vicinity. Escalation is determined by several factors, including hormone levels, energy expenditure, expected outcome, and importance of location. At all stages, an upright tail shows willingness to escalate, while a curled tail shows willingness to submit. Because higher aggression is metabolically costly and potentially debilitating, contact is much more likely to escalate when the conflict is over access to good foraging grounds. Further aggression has also been reported in captive loggerheads. The turtles are seemingly territorial, and will fight with other loggerheads and sea turtles of different species.

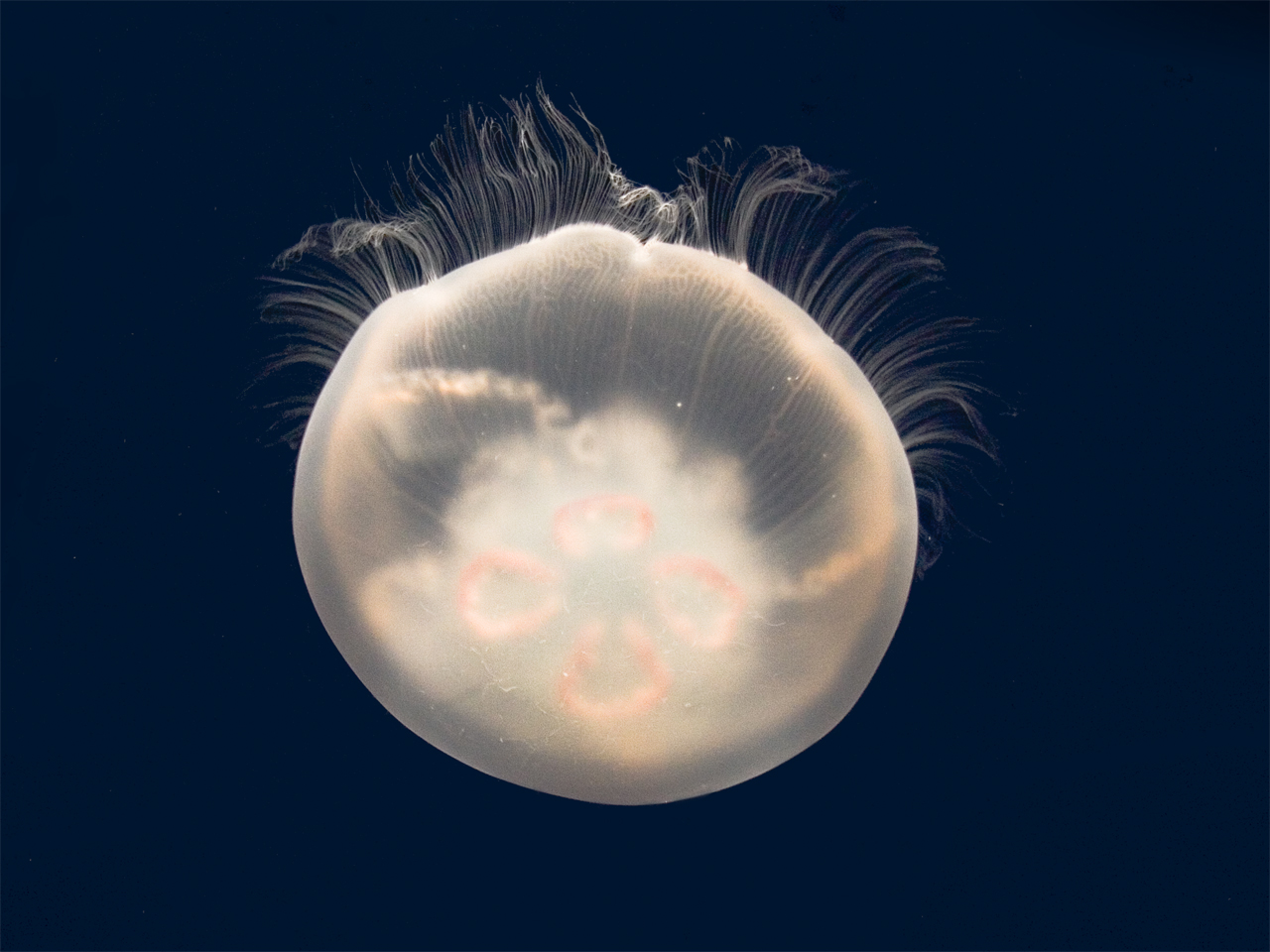
An adult Aurelia jellyfish which loggerheads eat during migration through the open sea

=== Feeding ===
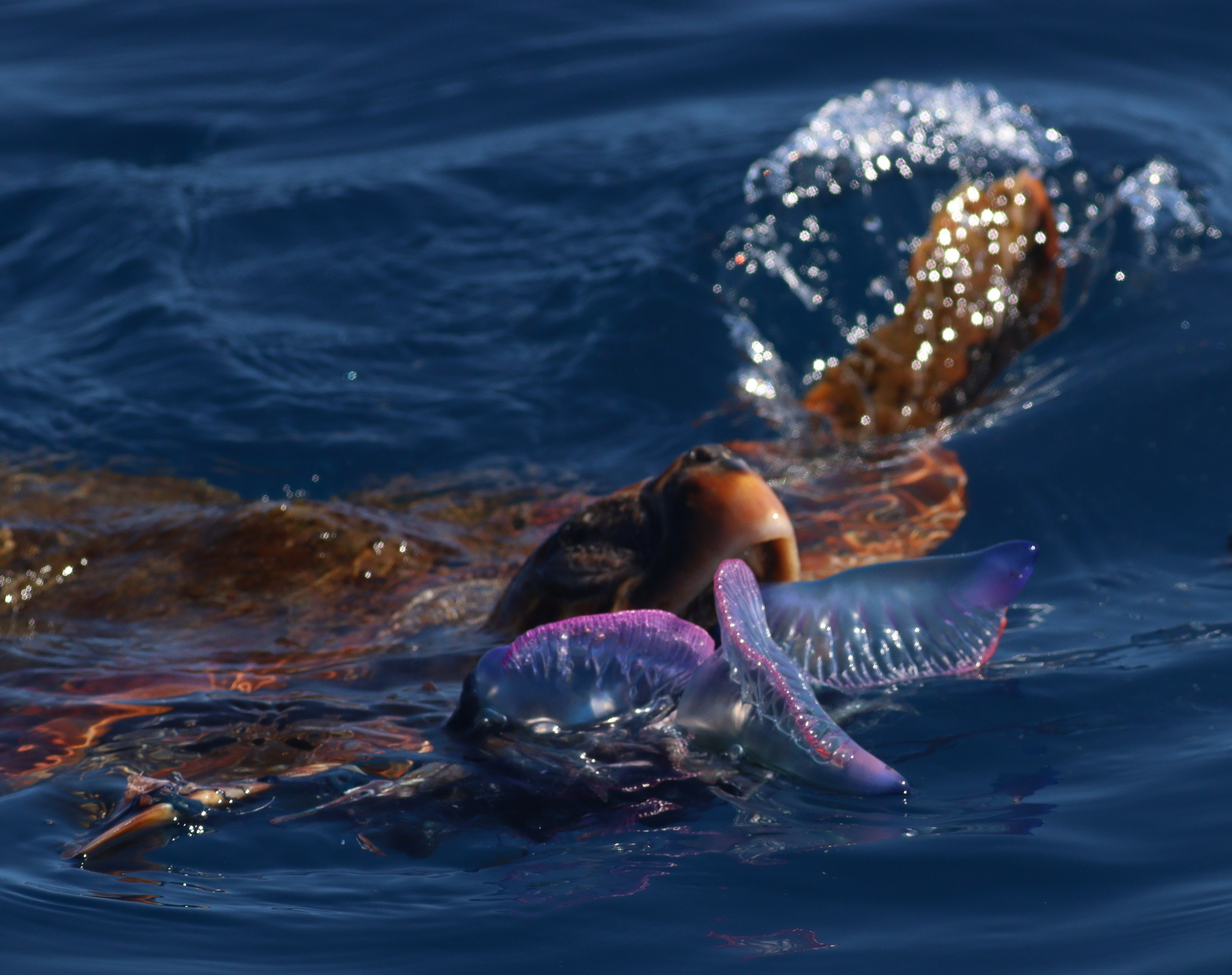
Feeding on Portuguese men o'war

The loggerhead sea turtle is omnivorous, feeding mainly on bottom-dwelling invertebrates, such as whelks, conchs, bivalves, and horseshoe crabs. It has a greater list of known prey than any other sea turtle. Other food items include sponges, corals, sea pens, polychaete worms, tube worms, sea anemones, cephalopods, barnacles, brachiopods, amphipods, isopods, Portuguese men o' war, insects, bryozoans, hydrozoans, sea urchins, sand dollars, sea cucumbers, starfish, tunicates, fish (eggs, juveniles, and adults), hatchling turtles (including members of its own species), algae, and vascular plants. During migration through the open sea, loggerheads eat jellyfish, floating molluscs, floating egg clusters, squid, and flying fish.

Loggerheads crush prey with their large and powerful jaws. Projecting scale points on the anterior margin of the forelimbs allow manipulation of the food. These points can be used as "pseudo-claws" to tear large pieces of food in the loggerhead's mouth. The loggerhead will turn its neck sideways to consume the torn food on the scale points. Inward-pointing, mucus-covered papillae found in the fore region of the loggerhead's esophagus filter out foreign bodies, such as fish hooks. The next region of the esophagus is not papillated, with numerous mucosal folds. The digestion rate in loggerheads is temperature-dependent; it increases as temperature increases.

=== Predators ===
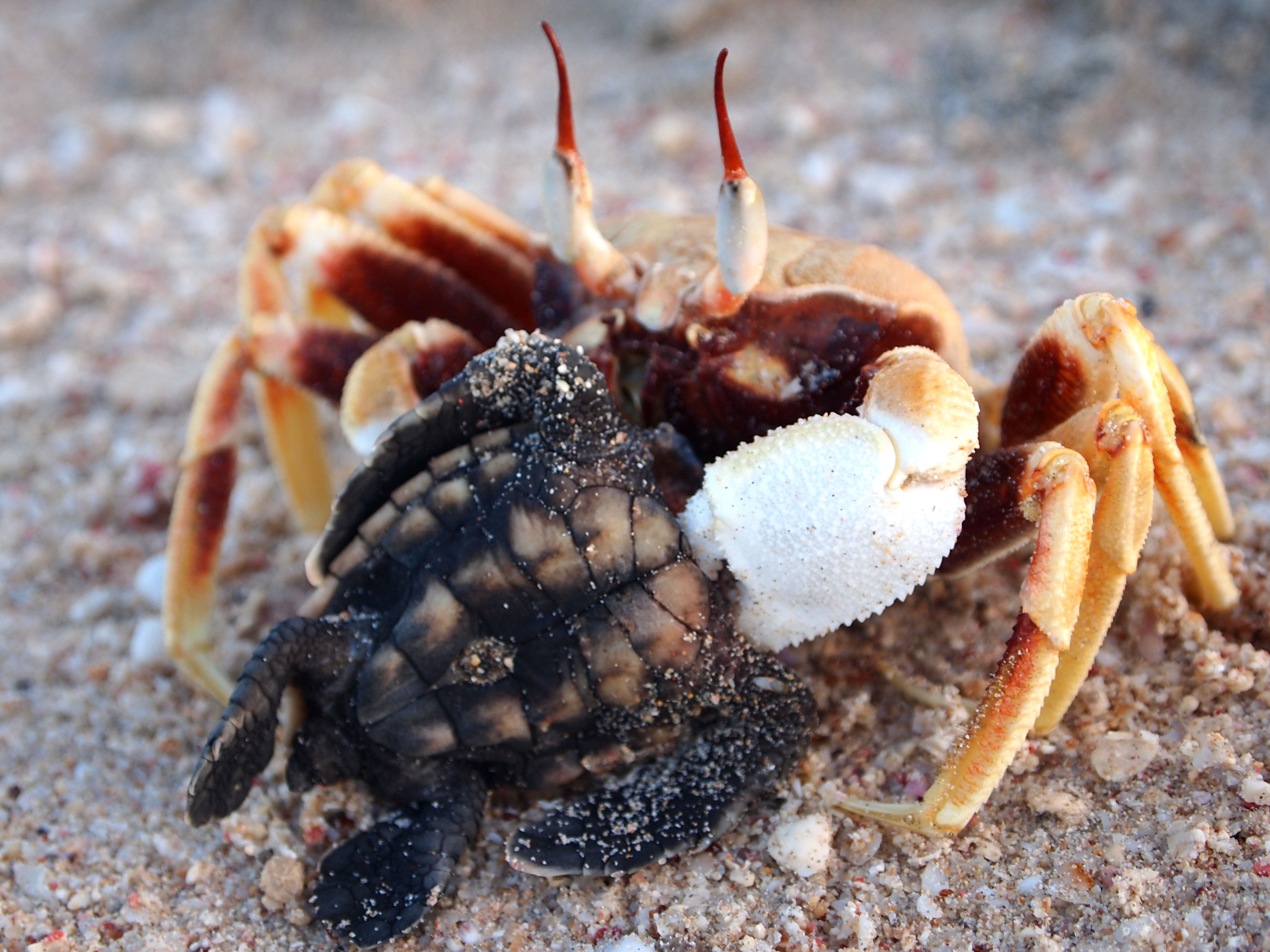
A horned ghost crab (Ocypode ceratophthalma) preying on a loggerhead hatchling in Gnaraloo, Western Australia. Ghost crabs are one of the chief causes of egg and hatchling mortality in sea turtles.

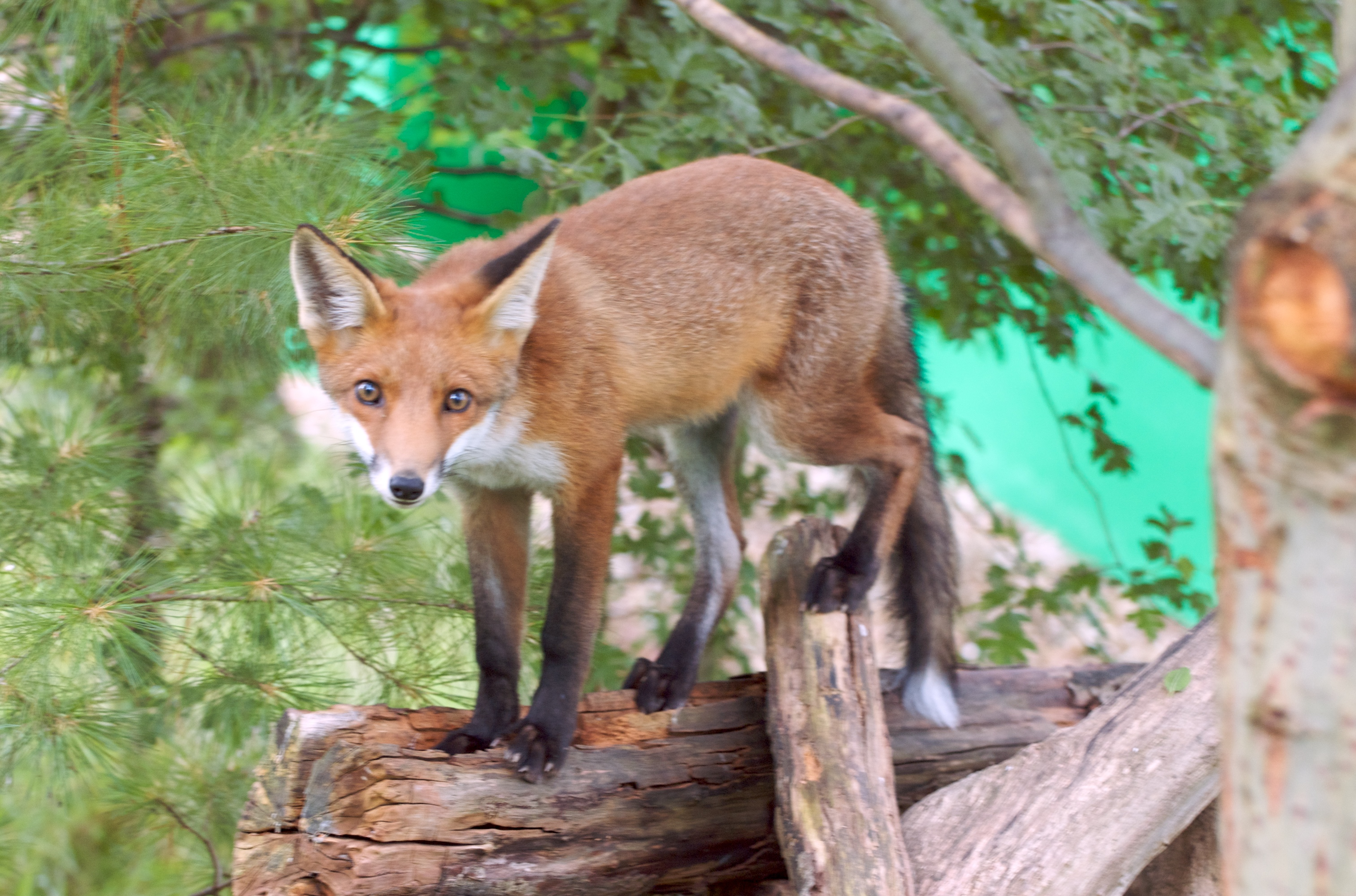
The red fox is a predator of loggerhead nests in Australia.

Loggerheads have numerous predators, especially early in their lives. Egg and nestling predators include ghost crabs, oligochaete worms, some beetles, flesh fly larvae, some ants, flesh flies, snakes, gulls, corvids, opossums, bears, rats, armadillos, mustelids, skunks, canids like coyotes, dingos, the Red foxes in Australia, Jackals and feral dogs, procyonids, Feral cats, Feral pigs, and humans. During their migration from their nests to the sea, hatchlings are preyed on by dipteran larvae, crabs, toads, lizards, snakes, seabirds such as frigatebirds, and other assorted birds and mammals. In the ocean, predators of the loggerhead juveniles include portunid crabs and various fishes, such as parrotfishes and moray eels. Adults are more rarely attacked due to their large size, but may be preyed on by large sharks (such as bull sharks, oceanic whitetip sharks, tiger sharks, and great white sharks), monk seals, and killer whales. Nesting females are attacked by flesh flies, feral dogs, and humans. Salt marsh mosquitos can also pester nesting females.

In Australia, the introduction of the red fox (Vulpes vulpes) by British settlers in the 19th century led to significant reductions in loggerhead sea turtle populations. In one coastal section in eastern Australia during the 1970s, predation of turtle eggs destroyed up to 95% of all clutches laid. Aggressive efforts to destroy foxes in the 1980s and 1990s has reduced this impact; however, it is estimated that it will be the year 2020 before populations will experience complete recovery from such dramatic losses.

Along the southeastern coast of the United States, the raccoon (Procyon lotor) is the most destructive predator of nesting sites. Mortality rates of nearly 100% of all clutches laid in a season have been recorded on some Florida beaches. This is attributed to an increase in raccoon populations, which have flourished in urban environments. Aggressive efforts to protect nesting sites by covering them with wire mesh has significantly reduced the impact of raccoon predation on loggerhead sea turtle eggs.

Up to 40% of nesting females around the world have wounds believed to come from shark attacks.

=== Disease and parasites ===
Infectious bacteria such as Pseudomonas and Salmonella attack loggerhead hatchlings and eggs. Fungi such as Penicillium infect loggerhead sea turtle nests and cloacae.

Fibropapillomatosis disease caused by a form of the herpes-type virus threatens loggerheads with internal and external tumors. These tumors disrupt essential behaviors and, if on the eyes, cause permanent blindness. Trematodes of the family Spirorchiidae inhabit tissues throughout the body of the loggerhead, including vital organs, such as the heart and the brain. Trematode infection can be highly debilitating. For example, inflammatory trematode lesions can cause endocarditis and neurological disease. A nematode, Angiostoma carettae, also infects loggerheads, causing histologic lesions in the respiratory tract.

More than 100 species of animals from 13 phyla, as well as 37 kinds of algae, live on loggerheads' backs. These parasitic organisms, which increase drag, offer no known benefit to the turtle, although the dulling effect of organisms on shell color may improve camouflage.

In 2018, researchers from Florida State University examined 24 individual turtle carapaces and found an average of 33,000 meiofauna with one turtle having 150,000 organisms living on the shell. A collection of 7,000 nematodes from 111 genera were found on the turtles studied.

== Life history ==
=== Early life ===
Hatchling running to sea

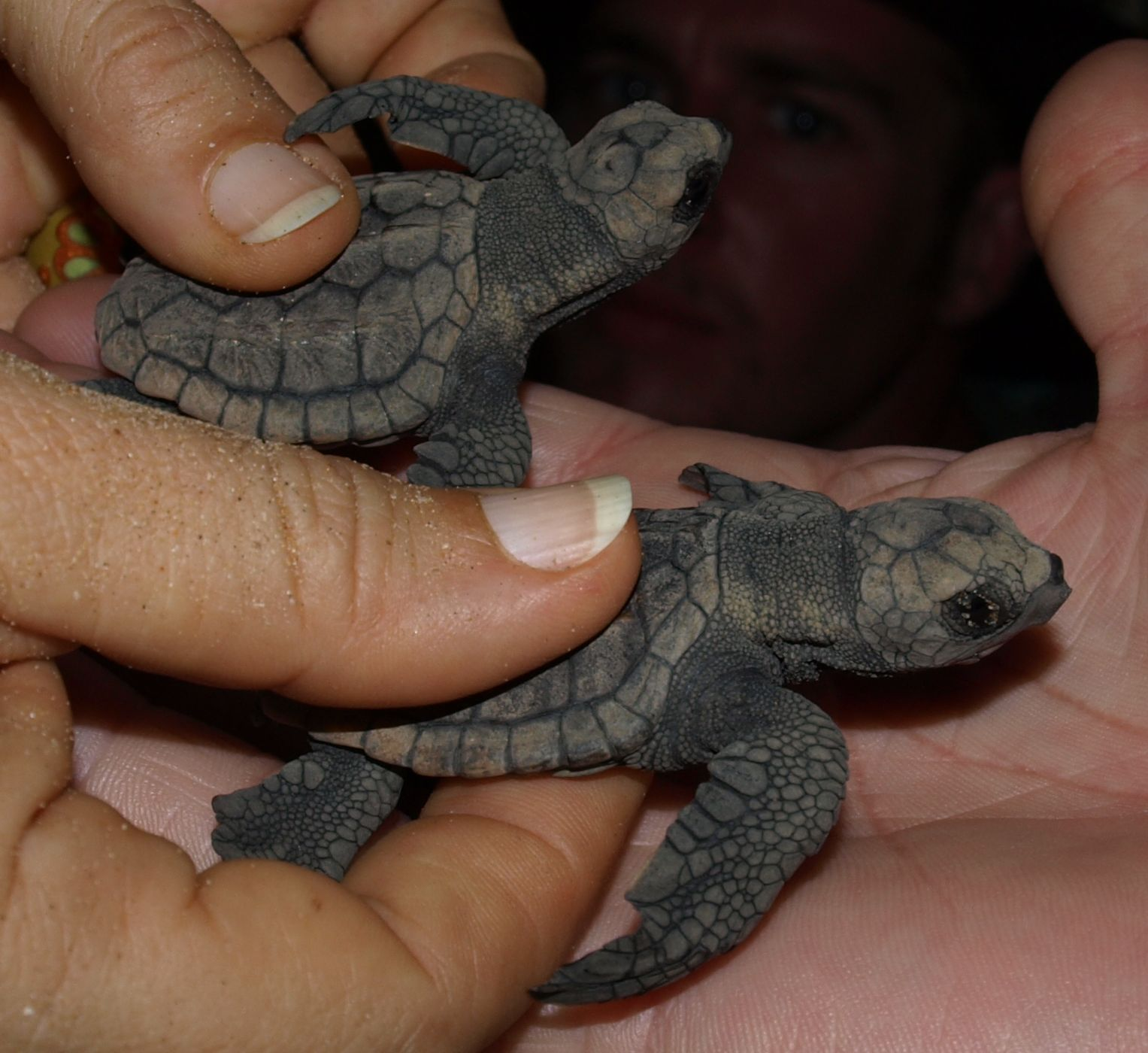
A pair of hatchlings to scale with a human hand

Hatchlings range in color from light brown to almost black, lacking the adult's distinct yellows and reds. Upon hatching, they measure about 4.6 cm (1.8 in) and weigh about 20 g (0.7 oz). The eggs are typically laid on the beach in an area above the high-tide line. The eggs are laid near the water so the hatchlings can return to the sea. The loggerhead's sex is dictated by the temperature of the underground nest. Incubation temperatures generally range from 26–32 °C (79–90 °F). Sea turtle eggs kept at a constant incubating temperature of 32 °C become females. Eggs incubating at 28 °C become males. An incubation temperature of 30 °C results in an equal ratio of male to female hatchlings. Hatchlings from eggs in the middle of the clutch tend to be the largest, grow the fastest, and be the most active during the first few days of sea life.

After incubating for around 80 days, hatchlings dig through the sand to the surface, usually at night, when darkness increases the chance of escaping predation and damage from extreme sand surface temperatures is reduced. Hatchlings enter the ocean by navigating toward the brighter horizon created by the reflection of the moon and starlight off the water's surface.

Hatchlings can lose up to 20% of their body mass due to evaporation of water as they journey from nest to ocean. They initially use the undertow to push them five to 10 m away from the shore. Once in the ocean, they swim for about 20 hours, taking them far offshore. An iron compound, magnetite, in their brains allows the turtles to perceive the Earth's magnetic field, for navigation. Many hatchlings use Sargassum in the open ocean as protection until they reach 45 cm (18 in). Hatchling loggerheads live in this pelagic environment until they reach juvenile age, and then they migrate to nearshore waters.

=== Maturation ===
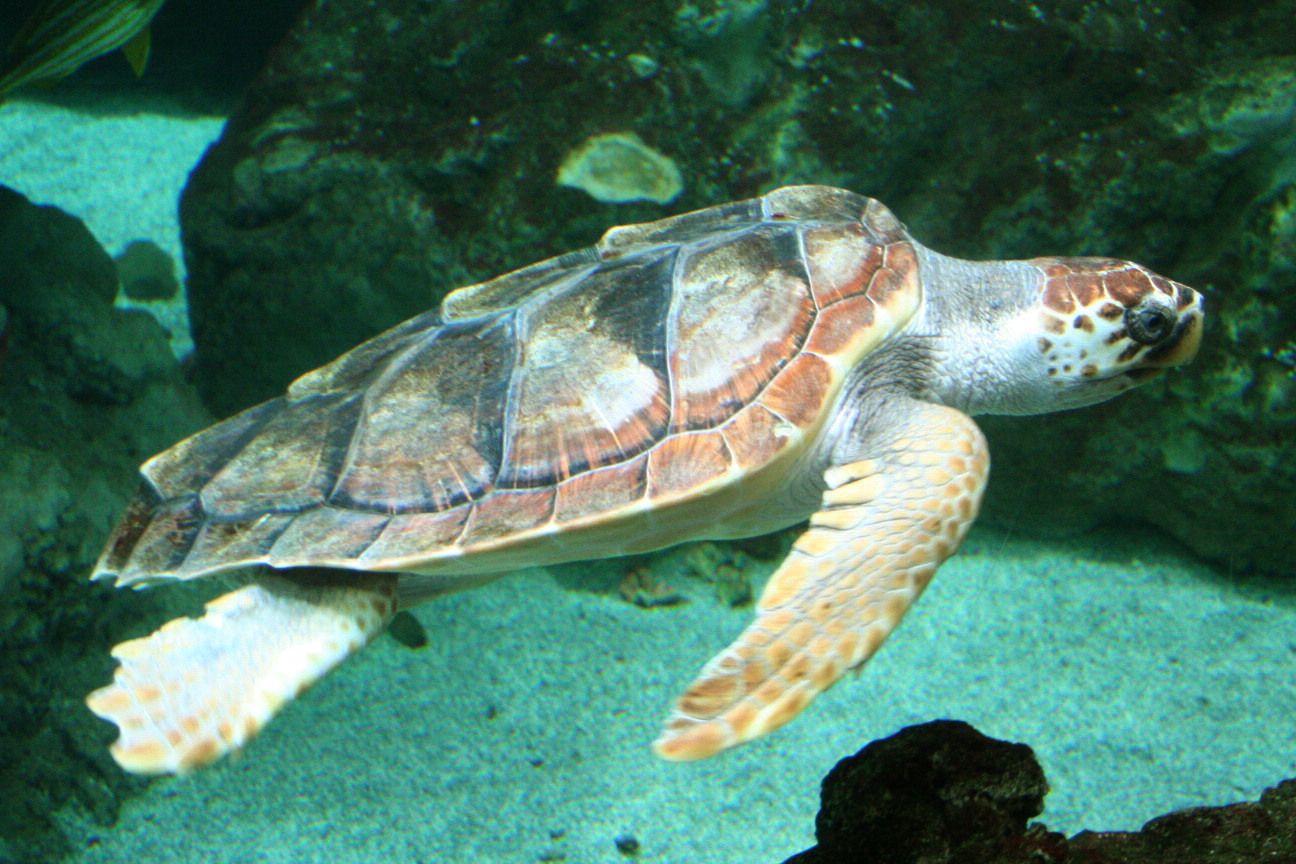
A mature loggerhead sea turtle

When ocean waters cool, loggerheads must migrate to warmer areas or hibernate to some degree. In the coldest months, they submerge for up to seven hours at a time, emerging for only seven minutes to breathe. Although outdone by freshwater turtles, these are among the longest recorded dives for any air-breathing marine vertebrate. During their seasonal migration, juvenile loggerheads have the ability to use both magnetic and visual cues. When both aids are available, they are used in conjunction; if one aid is not available, the other suffices. The turtles swim at about 1.6 km/h (0.9 kn; 0.4 m/s) during migration.

Like all marine turtles, the loggerhead prepares for reproduction in its foraging area. This takes place several years before the loggerhead migrates to a mating area. Female loggerheads first reproduce at ages 28–33 in Southeastern United States and Australia, and at ages 17–30 in South Africa. Age at first reproduction in the Mediterranean, Oman, Japan, and Brazil are unknown. Nesting loggerheads have a straight carapace length of 70–109 cm (28–43 in). Because of the large range, carapace length is not a reliable indicator of sexual maturity. Their estimated maximum lifespan is 47–67 years in the wild.

=== Reproduction ===
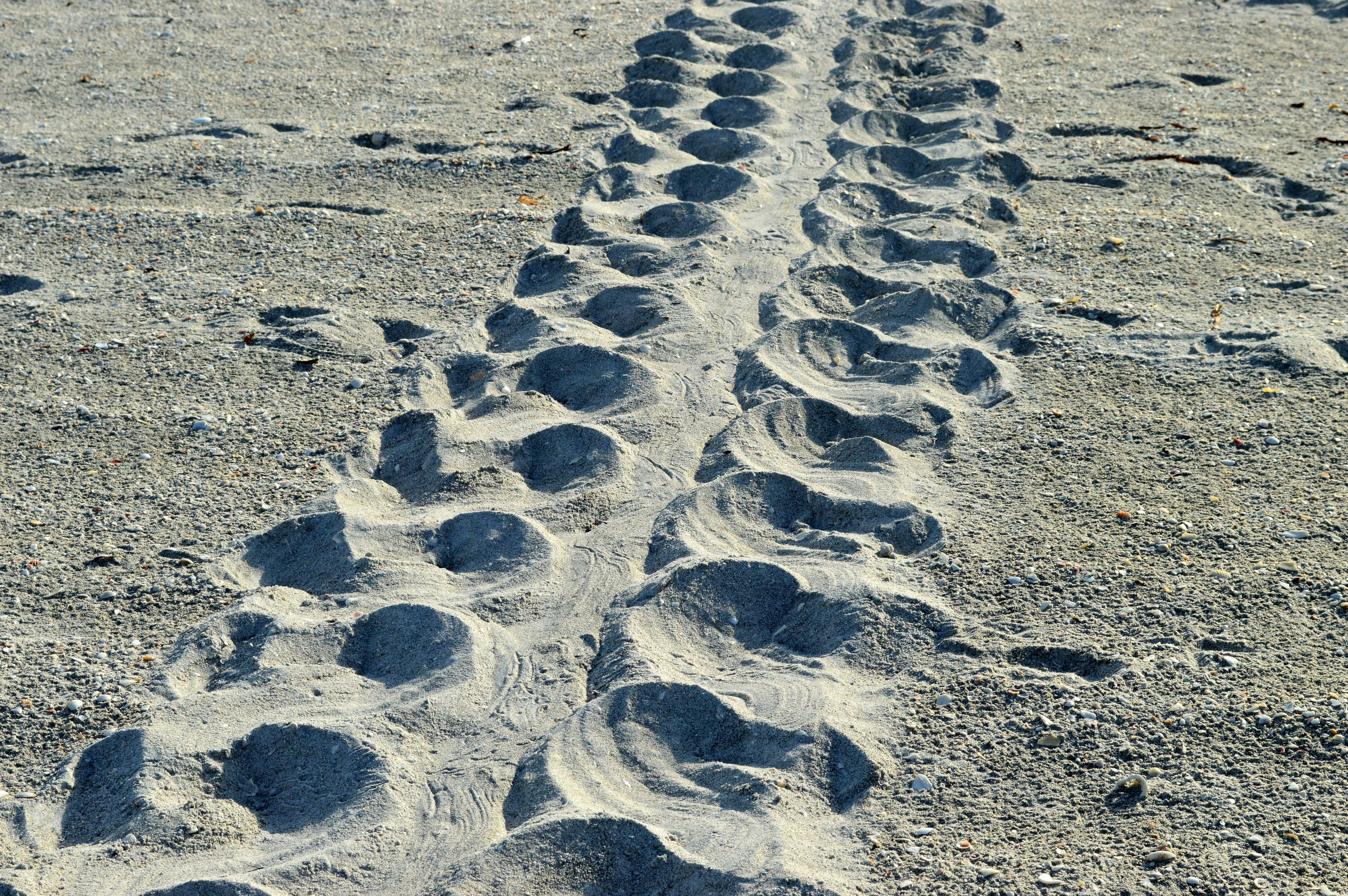
Loggerhead turtle track on a beach

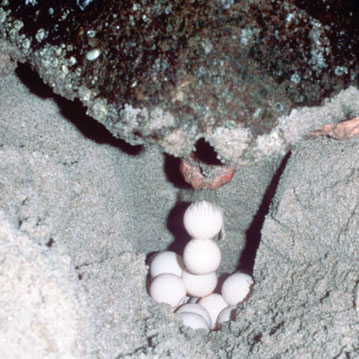
A loggerhead sea turtle laying eggs

Female loggerheads first reproduce between the ages of 17 and 33, and their mating period may last more than six weeks. They court their mates, but these behaviors have not been thoroughly examined. Male forms of courtship behavior include nuzzling, biting, and head and flipper movements. Studies suggest females produce cloacal pheromones to indicate reproductive ability. Before mating, the male approaches a female and attempts to mount her, while she resists. Next, the male and female begin to circle each other. If the male has competitors, the female may let the males struggle with each other. The winner then mounts the female; the male's curved claws usually damage the shoulders of the female's shell during this process. Other courting males bite the male while he is attempting to copulate, damaging his flippers and tail, possibly exposing bones. Such damage can cause the male to dismount and may require weeks to heal. While nesting, females produce an average of 3.9 egg clutches, and then become quiescent, producing no eggs for two to three years. Unlike other sea turtles, courtship and mating usually do not take place near the nesting beach, but rather along migration routes between feeding and breeding grounds. Recent evidence indicates ovulation in loggerheads is mating-induced. Through the act of mating, the female ovulates eggs which are fertilized by the male. This is unique, as mating-induced ovulation is rare outside of mammals. In the Northern Hemisphere, loggerheads mate from late March to early June. The nesting season is short, between May and August in the Northern Hemisphere and between October and March in the Southern Hemisphere.

Loggerheads may display multiple paternity. Multiple paternity is possible due to sperm storage. The female can store sperm from multiple males in her oviducts until ovulation. A single clutch may have as many as seven fathers, each contributing sperm to a portion of the clutch. Multiple paternity and female size are positively correlated. Two hypotheses explain this correlation. One posits that males favor large females because of their perceived higher fecundity (ability to reproduce). The other states, because larger females are able to swim more quickly to mating grounds, they have longer mating periods.

All sea turtles have similar basic nesting behaviors. Females return to lay eggs at intervals of 12–17 days during the nesting season, on or near the beach where they hatched. They exit the water, climb the beach, and scrape away the surface sand to form a body pit. With their hind limbs, they excavate an egg chamber in which the eggs are deposited. The females then cover the egg chamber and body pit with sand, and finally return to the sea. This process takes one to two hours, and occurs in open sand areas or on top of sand dunes, preferably near dune grasses that the females can use to camouflage the nest. The nesting area must be selected carefully because it affects characteristics such as fitness, emergence ratio, and vulnerability to nest predators. Loggerheads have an average clutch size of 112.4 eggs.

== Conservation ==
Many human activities have negative effects on loggerhead sea turtle populations. The prolonged time required for loggerheads to reach sexual maturity and the high mortality rates of eggs and young turtles from natural phenomena compound the problems of population reduction as a consequence of human activities.

=== Threats ===
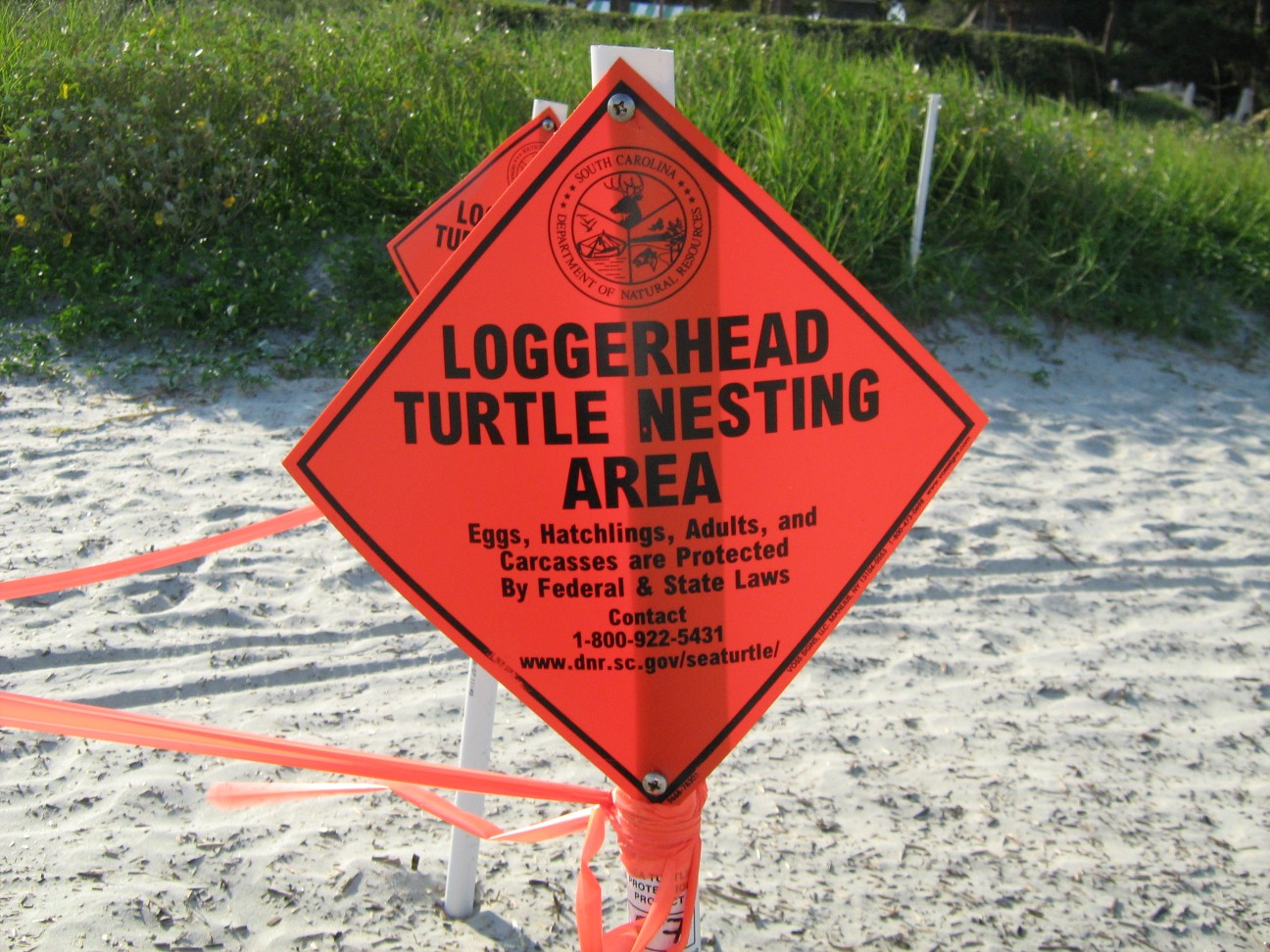
Loggerhead sea turtle nest roped off as part of the Sea Turtle Protection Project on Hilton Head Island

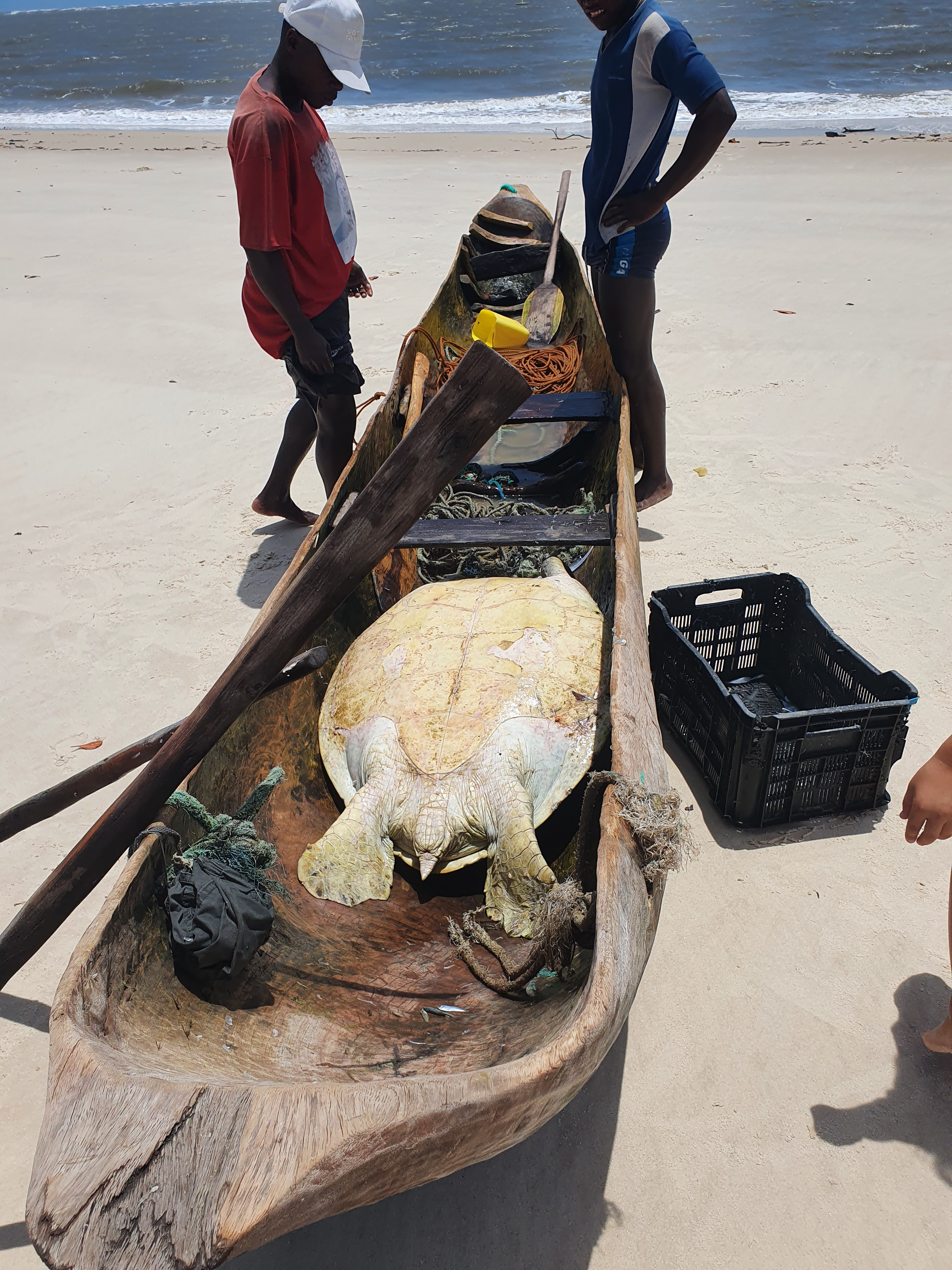
Artisanal fishers attempted to poach this loggerhead turtle in Mozambique. It was rescued and released by the Ilha do Fogo conservation team.

Loggerhead sea turtles were once intensively hunted for their meat and eggs; consumption has decreased, however, due to worldwide legislation. Despite this, turtle meat and eggs are still consumed in countries where regulations are not strictly enforced. In Mexico, turtle eggs are a common meal; locals claim the egg is an aphrodisiac. Eating turtle eggs or meat can cause serious illness due to harmful bacteria, such as Pseudomonas aeruginosa and Serratia marcescens, and high levels of toxic metals that build up through bioaccumulation.

The US West Coast is a critical migratory corridor for the Pacific loggerheads, in which these turtles swim across the Pacific to California's coast from breeding grounds in Japan. Important foraging habitats for juveniles in the central North Pacific have been revealed through telemetry studies. Along with these foraging habitats, high levels of bycatch from industrial-scale fisheries have been found to overlap; with drift gillnets in the past and longline fisheries presently. Many juvenile loggerheads aggregate off the coast of Baja California Sur, Mexico, where small coastal fisheries increase these turtles' mortality risk; fishers have reported catching dozens of loggerheads with bottom-set gear per day per boat. The most common commercial fishery that accidentally takes loggerheads are bottom trawls used for shrimp vessels in the Gulf of California. In 2000, between 2,600 and 6,000 loggerheads were estimated to have been killed by pelagic longlining in the Pacific.

Fishing gear is the biggest threat to loggerheads in the open ocean. They often become entangled in longlines or gillnets. According to the 2009 status review of loggerheads by the Fisheries Service, drowning from entanglement in longline and gillnet fishing gear is the turtles' primary threat in the North Pacific. They also become stuck in traps, pots, trawls, and dredges. Caught in this unattended equipment, loggerheads risk serious injury or drowning. Turtle excluder devices for nets and other traps reduce the number being accidentally caught.

Nearly 11 million metric tons of plastic are released into the ocean annually. A number that is projected to increase to 29 million metric tons by 2040. Turtles ingest a wide array of this floating debris, including bags, sheets, pellets, balloons and abandoned fishing line. Loggerheads may mistake the floating plastic for jellyfish, a common food item. The ingested plastic causes numerous health concerns, including intestinal blockage, reduced nutrient absorption and malnutrition, suffocation, ulcerations, or starvation. Ingested plastics release toxic compounds, including polychlorinated biphenyls, which may accumulate in internal tissues. Such toxins may lead to a thinning of eggshells, tissue damage, or deviation from natural behaviors.

Artificial lighting discourages nesting and interferes with the hatchlings' ability to navigate to the water's edge. Females prefer nesting on beaches free of artificial lighting. On developed beaches, nests are often clustered around tall buildings, perhaps because they block out the man-made light sources. Loggerhead hatchlings are drawn toward the brighter area over the water which is the consequence of the reflection of moon and star light. Confused by the brighter artificial light, they navigate inland, away from the protective waters, which exposes them to dehydration and predation as the sun rises. Artificial lighting causes tens of thousands of hatchling deaths per year.

Destruction and encroachment of habitat by humans is another threat to loggerhead sea turtles. Optimum nesting beaches are open-sand beaches above the high-tide line. However, beach development deprives them of suitable nesting areas, forcing them to nest closer to the surf. Urbanization often leads to the siltation of sandy beaches, decreasing their viability. Construction of docks and marinas can destroy near-shore habitats. Boat traffic and dredging degrades habitat and can also injure or kill turtles when boats collide with turtles at or near the surface.

Annual variations in climatic temperatures can affect sex ratios, since loggerheads have temperature-dependent sex determination. High sand temperatures may skew gender ratios in favor of females. Nesting sites exposed to unseasonably warm temperatures over a three-year period produced 87–99% females. This raises concern over the connection between rapid global temperature changes and the possibility of population extinction. A more localized effect on gender skewing comes from the construction of tall buildings, which reduce sun exposure, lowering the average sand temperature, which results in a shift in gender ratios to favor the emergence of male turtles. Construction of new thermal power stations can raise local water temperature, which is also said to be a threat.

The increase of temperature and food availability will increase reproduction output of loggerhead turtles. Many researchers agree that temperature increases due to climate change has a complicated impact on turtles. At breeding sites when a loggerhead turtle lays multiple clutches in a season, a higher temperature will cause the duration of time between laying two different nests to become shorter. The amount of food availability makes a difference in reproductive output because when there is a greater amount of food available, the turtles will grow to a larger size. The larger a turtle is, the more likely they will have a greater reproductive output. The amount of food also has a relationship to temperature. Researchers have found that an increase of temperature causes feeding grounds to produce more food.

Tropical Cyclones have a significant impact on hatchling loss. The associated storm surges push water higher up the beach, flooding nest and drowning the embryos. Strong wave action may eroded away sand, exposing the eggs to drying and predation. The current trend of rising sea surface temperatures and the increase in both numbers and intensities of tropical cyclones as a result of climate change pose a growing threat to turtle populations.

=== Conservation efforts ===
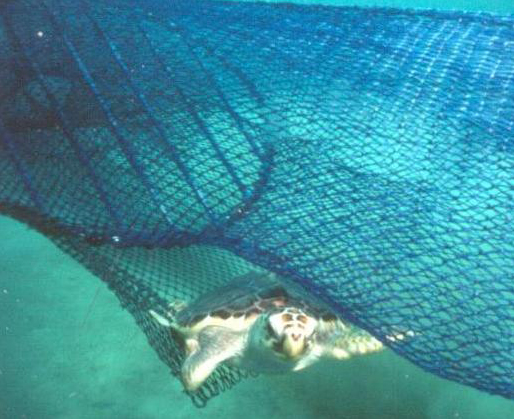
Loggerhead sea turtle escapes from fishing net through a turtle excluder device

Since the loggerhead occupies such a broad range, successful conservation requires efforts from multiple countries.

Loggerhead sea turtles are classified as vulnerable by the International Union for Conservation of Nature and are listed under Appendix I of the Convention on International Trade in Endangered Species, making commercial international trade prohibited. In the United States, the Fish and Wildlife Service and National Marine Fisheries Service classify them as a threatened species under the Endangered Species Act. Loggerheads are listed as endangered under both Australia's Environment Protection and Biodiversity Conservation Act 1999 and Queensland's Nature Conservation Act 1992. The Convention on Migratory Species works for the conservation of loggerhead sea turtles on the Atlantic coast of Africa, as well as in the Indian Ocean and southeast Asia. Throughout Japan, the Sea Turtle Association of Japan aids in the conservation of loggerhead sea turtles. Greece's ARCHELON works for their conservation. The Marine Research Foundation works for loggerhead conservation in Oman. Annex 2 of the Specially Protected Areas and Wildlife Protocol of the Cartagena Convention, which deals with pollution that could harm marine ecosystems, also protects them. Conservation organizations worldwide have worked with the shrimp trawling industry to develop turtle exclusion devices (TEDs) to exclude even the largest turtles. TEDs are mandatory for all shrimp trawlers.

In many places during the nesting season, workers and volunteers search the coastline for nests, and researchers may also go out during the evening to look for nesting females for tagging studies and gather barnacles and tissues samples. Volunteers may, if necessary, relocate the nests for protection from threats, such as high spring tides and predators, and monitor the nests daily for disturbances. After the eggs hatch, volunteers uncover and tally hatched eggs, undeveloped eggs, and dead hatchlings. Any remaining live hatchlings are released or taken to research facilities. Typically, those that lack the vitality to hatch and climb to the surface die.

To provide information on the demographic history, effects of climate change, and for informing the conservation of the species the chromosome scale genome and methylomes were assembled from turtles from the globally important Cape Verde rookery. Using ONT nanopore direct-DNA sequencing the blood methylome profile was also derived. The researchers finding the microchromosomes are particularly useful for monitoring functional genetic and epigenetic diversity.

==== United States ====
The National Marine Fisheries Service (NMFS), National Oceanic and Atmospheric Administration (NOAA), the U.S. Fish and Wildlife Services (USFWS), and the Department of the Interior ruled four distinct population segments as threatened (Northwestern Atlantic Ocean, South Atlantic Ocean, Southeast Indo-Pacific Ocean, and Southwest Indian Ocean) and five as endangered (Mediterranean Sea, North Indian Ocean, North Pacific Ocean, Northeast Atlantic Ocean, and South Pacific Ocean) effective on October 24, 2011.

Off the coast of southern California NMFS, NOAA, and Department of Commerce prohibited fishing with large drift gillnet (DGN) gear in the loggerhead conservation area during the presence of El Niño conditions in order to protect the endangered North Pacific Ocean loggerhead DPS. This ruling effective July 23, 2014 was intended to prevent bycatch of loggerhead sea turtles. A team including sea turtle biologists and oceanographers determined the presence of El Niño conditions based on the El Niño watch issued by the Climate Prediction Center (CPC), anomalies found in sea surface temperature (SST) charts published by NOAA's Coast Watch Program, the presence of loggerhead sea turtles in the Pacific loggerhead conservation area, and reports of loggerhead strandings. The SST data showed higher than average temperatures during summer months off the coast of southern California. This same fisheries closure ruling due to El Niño conditions was again implemented May 29, 2015, and then again June 1, 2016.

Critical habitat designation for the Northwest Atlantic Ocean DPS of loggerhead sea turtles specified 38 marine areas that include nearshore reproductive habitat, breeding areas, winter area, constricted migratory corridors, and Sargassum habitat. This ruling was made the NMFS, NOAA, and Department of Commerce effective August 11, 2014. Nesting beaches were identified as critical terrestrial habitat by Fish and Wildlife Services and the Department of the Interior within the Atlantic Ocean and Gulf of Mexico, effective August 11, 2014. The 2012 BiOp is an integral component to managing the shallow-set fishery, because the one-year incidental take statement (ITS, including reasonable and prudent management measures, and terms and conditions) forms the basis for regulations that specify the annual limits on leatherback and North Pacific loggerhead sea turtle interactions with the fishery that are necessary to manage the impacts of the fishery on sea turtles.

Effective January 11, 2010 the NMFS, NOAA, and Department of Commerce removed the limit on the number of fishing gear deployments for the Hawaii-based pelagic shallow-set longline fisheries and simultaneously increased the number of incidental interactions allowed with loggerhead sea turtles. This ruling stated that longline fisheries may not interact with over 46 loggerhead sea turtles a year, a number thought to not interfere with survival and recovery of loggerhead sea turtles. This ruling was revised March 10, 2011 to reduce the number of allowed interactions from 46 a year to 17, a revision aimed to protect the loggerheads and maintain fishery yield. November 18, 2011 the pelagic shallow-set longline fisheries in Hawaii reached the annual limit on physical interactions with turtles and was closed by NMFS. Incidental interaction limit for loggerhead turtles was increased from 17 to 34 interactions a year starting November 5, 2012.

== Symbols ==
The loggerhead sea turtle appears on the $1000 Colombian peso coin. In the United States, the loggerhead sea turtle is the official state reptile of South Carolina and also the state saltwater reptile of Florida.

== See also ==
- Adelita, the first sea turtle tracked across an ocean basin.
- İztuzu Beach, one of the prime nesting habitats of the loggerhead turtle in the Mediterranean
- Sea turtle threats
