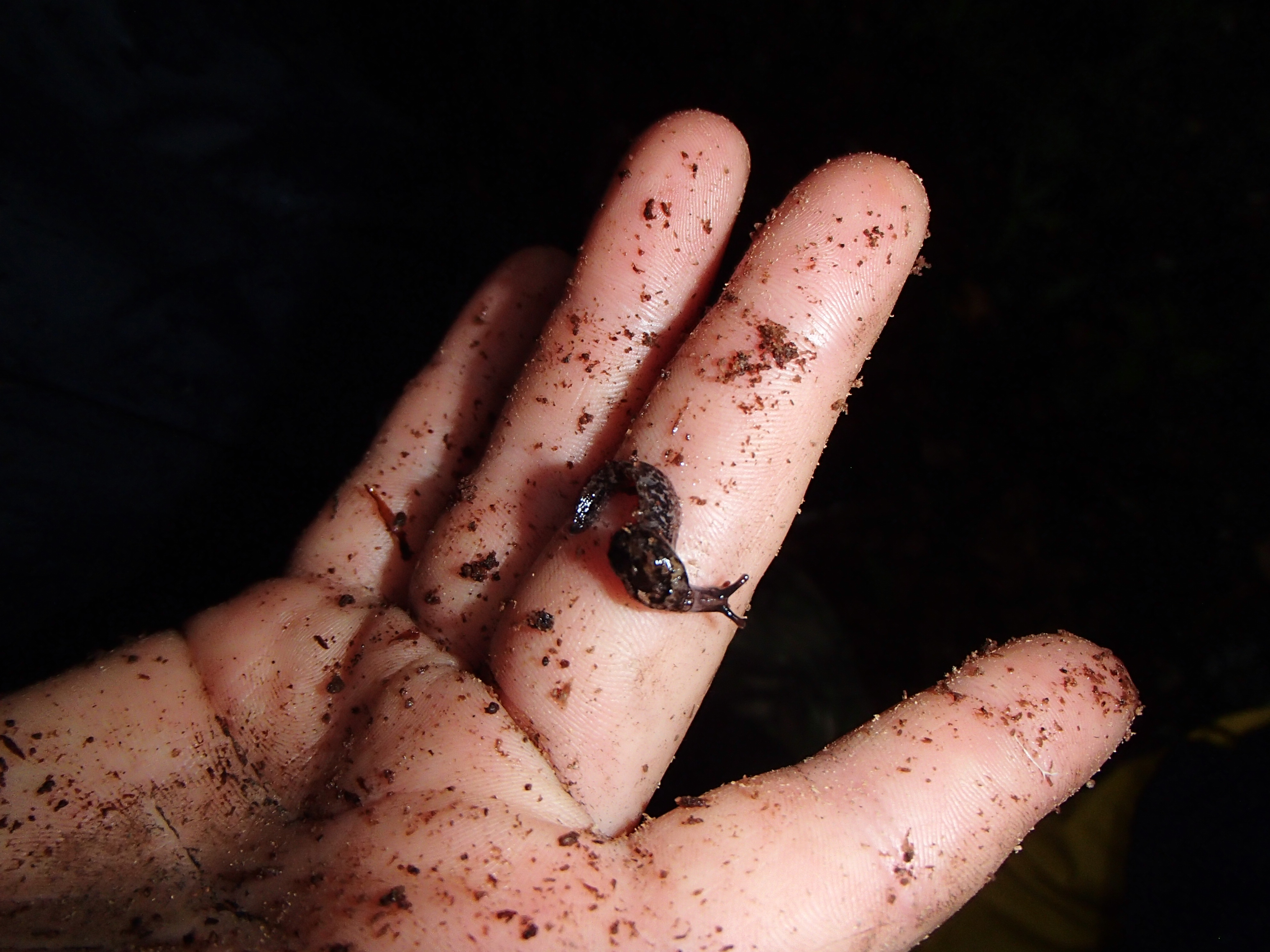
- Otoconcha dimidiata

Scientific classification
- Kingdom: Animalia
- Phylum: Mollusca
- Class: Gastropoda
- Order: Stylommatophora
- Family: Charopidae
- Genus: Otoconcha; Hutton, 1884

Synonyms
- Otoconcha (Maoriconcha) Dell, 1952 · accepted, alternate representation; Otoconcha (Otoconcha) Hutton, 1883 · accepted, alternate representation

= Otoconcha =

Genus of gastropods

Otoconcha is a genus of small air-breathing semi-slugs, terrestrial pulmonate gastropod molluscs in the family Charopidae.

Otoconcha is the type genus of the subfamily Otoconchinae.

== Description ==
Frederick Wollaston Hutton firstly defined this genus in 1884. Hutton's diagnosis reads as follows:

Shell external, of very few rapidly increasing whorls, all of which are open underneath. Animal limaciform, much too large to withdraw into the shell; mantle rather anterior, covering the shell; no locomotive disc, nor mucous caudal gland. Jaw with distant ribs.

== Species ==
Species within the genus Otoconcha include:

- Otoconcha dimidiata (Pfeiffer, 1853) - type species
- Otoconcha fiordlandica (Dell, 1952)
- Otoconcha oconnori (Powell, 1941)
- Otoconcha roscoei Climo, 1971
