= Tongapōrutu River =

Coordinates: 38°49′S 174°35′E

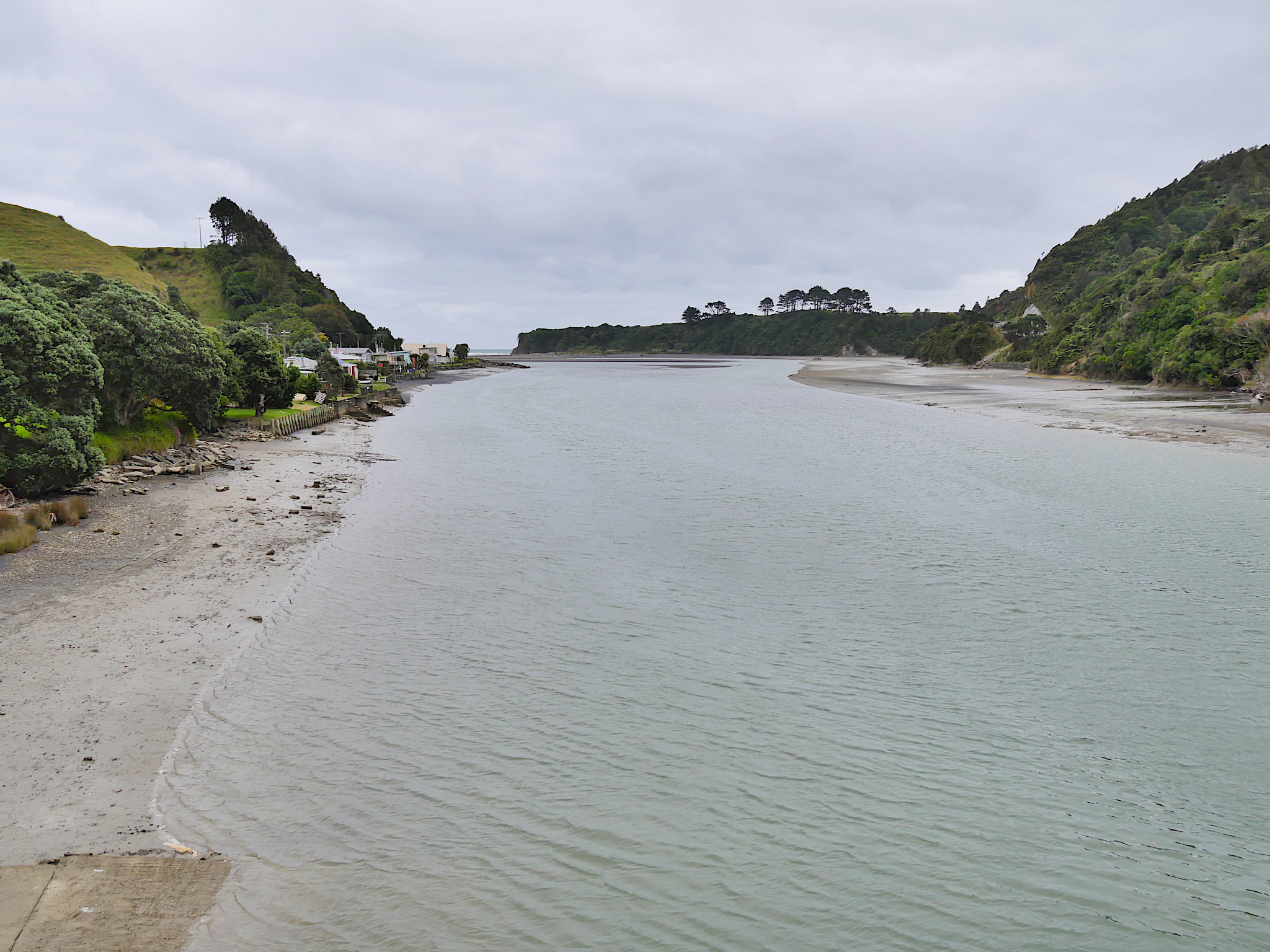

Location
- Country: New Zealand

Physical characteristics
- Mouth
  - location: North Taranaki Bight
- Length: 36 km (22 mi)

The Tongapōrutu River is a river of the Taranaki region of New Zealand's North Island. It initially flows north from its origins near Tahora, turning west to reach the Tasman Sea coast close to the settlement of Tongapōrutu, 15 kilometres (9.3 mi) south of Mokau.

One of the largest North Island water falls, Mount Damper Falls, is located on a tributary of the river, Mount Damper Stream near Tahora.

At the river mouth, there are Māori petroglyphs in some caves in the cliffs, including one which shoes a six-toed foot. This location is also very near the Three Sisters and Elephant Rock seastacks.

== See also ==
- List of rivers of New Zealand
