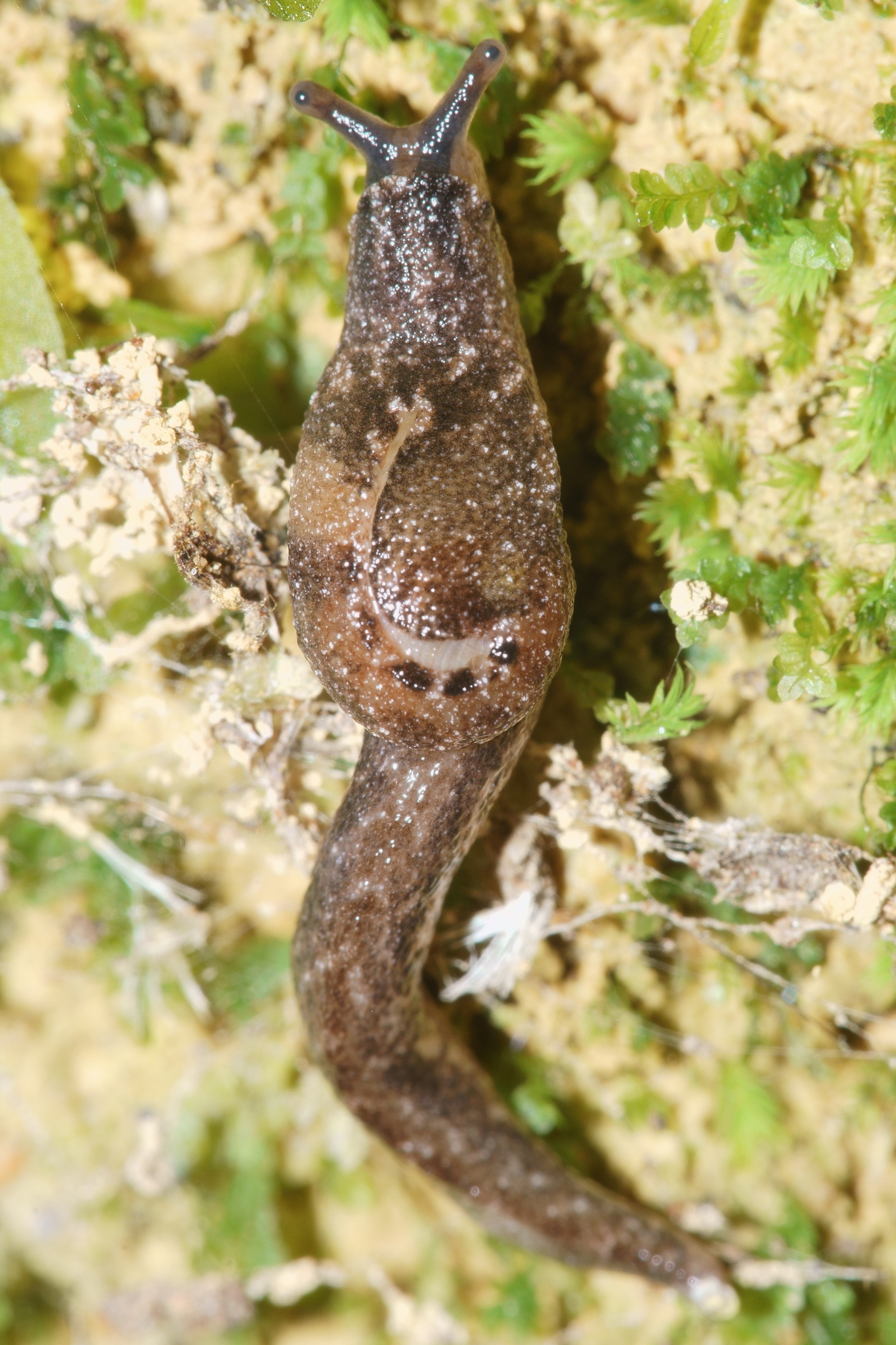
- Otoconcha dimidiata from Wainuiomata Regional Park

Scientific classification
- Kingdom: Animalia
- Phylum: Mollusca
- Class: Gastropoda
- Order: Stylommatophora
- Family: Charopidae
- Genus: Otoconcha
- Species: O. dimidiata

Binomial name
- Otoconcha dimidiata (Pfeiffer, 1853)

Synonyms
- Vitrina dimidiata Pfeiffer, 1853

= Otoconcha dimidiata =

Species of gastropod

Otoconcha dimidiata is a species of small air-breathing semi-slug, a terrestrial pulmonate gastropod mollusc in the family Charopidae. It has a very thin and cap like shell hidden under its skin in the rounded swelling behind the head.

Otoconcha dimidiata is the type species of the genus Otoconcha.

== Distribution ==
This species occurs in both North and South islands of New Zealand.

== Habitat ==
This semi slug lives in rotting logs where it is rarely seen because of its secretive habits, but it is not rare. It can be found by careful searching by torch light in damp areas of native forest.

== Ecology ==
Otoconcha dimidiata is the preferred prey of the carnivorous land gastropod Schizoglossa novoseelandica.
