= Mimi, New Zealand =

Mimi
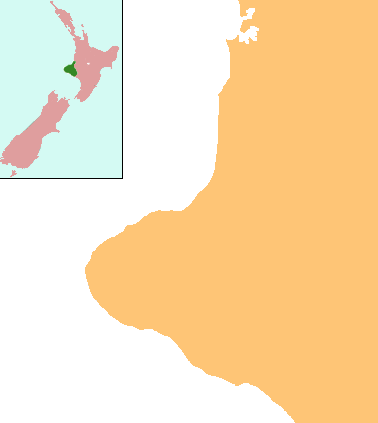
- Coordinates: 38°58′22″S 174°27′6″E
- Country: New Zealand
- Region: Taranaki
- District: New Plymouth District

Mimi is a locality in northern Taranaki, in the North Island of New Zealand. It is located on State Highway 3 close to the shore of the North Taranaki Bight, 6 kilometres north-east of Urenui and 26 km south-west of Ahititi. The Mimi River flows past the settlement into the North Taranaki Bight.

== Marae ==
Pukearuhe Marae is located on the Mimi coast. It features the Tama Ariki meeting house, and is affiliated with the tribe of Ngāti Tama.

In October 2020, the Government committed $103,310 from the Provincial Growth Fund to upgrade the marae, creating an estimated 25 jobs.

== Education ==
Mimi School is a coeducational contributing primary (years 1–6) school with a decile rating of 4 and a roll of 27.
