= Po Delta Interregional Park =

The Po Delta Interregional Park (Italian: Parco interregionale Delta del Po) is a proposed agency in Italy for a joint administration of the two Po Delta Regional Parks now separately administered by Veneto and Emilia-Romagna regions. The new agency will operate in concert with the Italian Ministry of the Environment in order to better protect the river Po and its basin in the provinces of Rovigo and of Ferrara.

== History ==
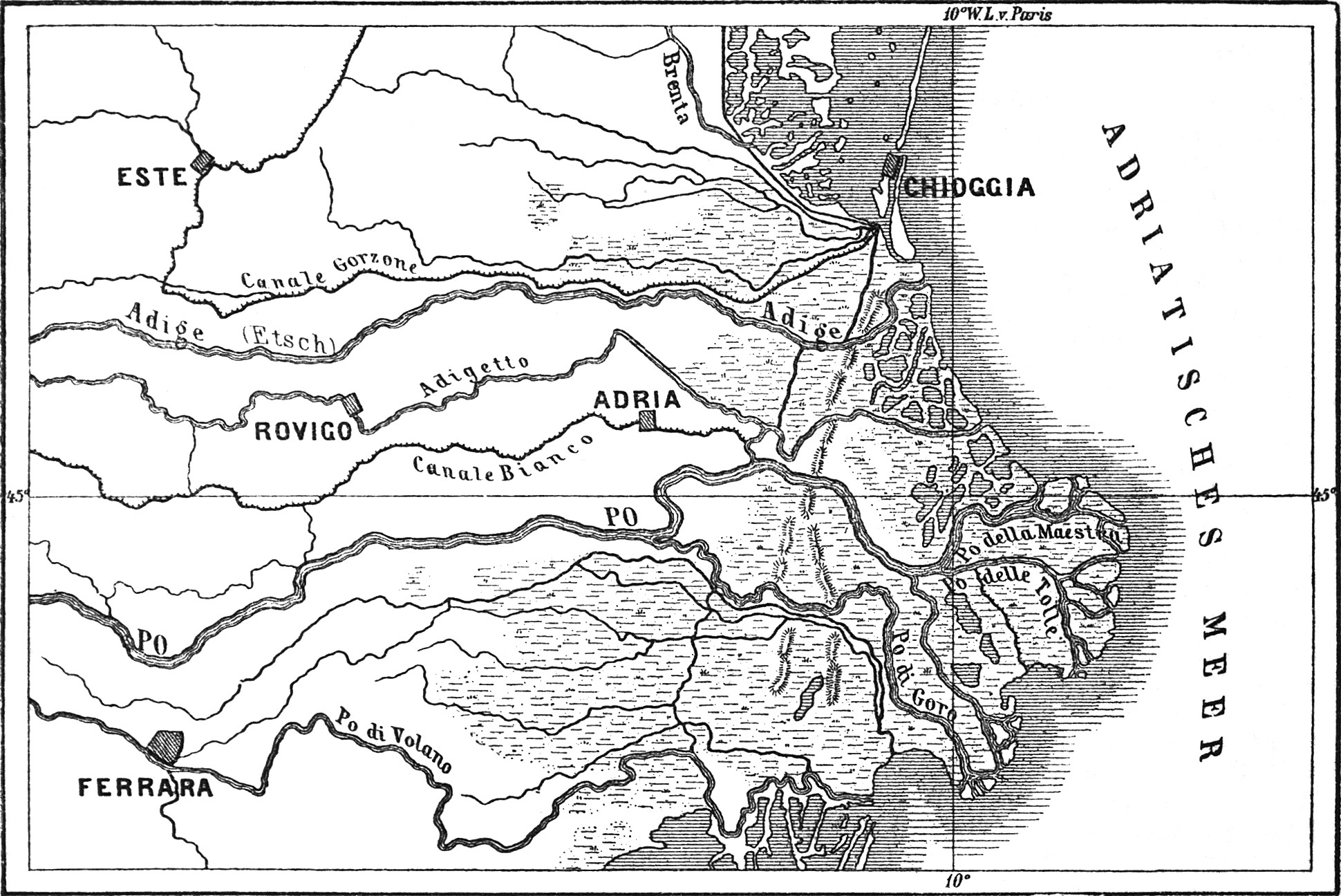
The delta of the Po in the 19th Century

Years of controversies and diatribe initially prevented to the two regional administrations and the provincial and communal administrations finally led to a combined management agreement for the protected area of the delta of the Po, defined as being of irreplaceable natural, landscape and historical interest. The Po Delta, a World Heritage Site, is also a centre of strong economic interests. For instance there are immense areas of peach breeding and cultivation, energy production centered at the thermoelectric plant at Porto Tolle and tourist interests.
