= Tongapōrutu =

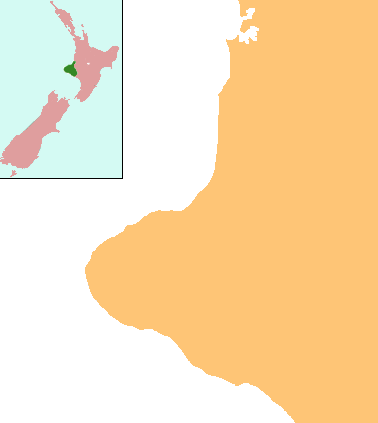
- Coordinates: 38°49′12″S 174°35′53″E
- Country: New Zealand
- Region: Taranaki
- District: New Plymouth District

Tongapōrutu is a settlement in northern Taranaki, in the North Island of New Zealand. It is located on State Highway 3 at the mouth of the Tongapōrutu River, 15 kilometres south of Mōkau. Tongapōrutu is well known in New Zealand for its 'Three Sisters' rock formations and its Māori petroglyphs carved into cave rock walls. However, both the Māori rock carvings and the Three Sisters formations are constantly being eroded by the Tasman Sea.
