= Angiostomatidae =

Scientific classification
- Domain: Eukaryota
- Kingdom: Animalia
- Phylum: Nematoda
- Class: Chromadorea
- Subclass: Rhabditia
- Family: Angiostomatidae

Family of roundworms

Angiostomatidae is a family of parasitic nematodes.

== Genera ==
Genera in the family Angiostomatidae include:

- Angiostoma Dujardin, 1845
- Aulacnema P. V. Luc, S. E. Spiridonov & M. J. Wilson, 2005 - genus Aulacnema contains only one species:
  - Aulacnema monodelphis P. V. Luc, S. E. Spiridonov & M. J. Wilson, 2005 - a parasite of terrestrial molluscs in Vietnam
