= Hāwera =

Town in Taranaki Region, New Zealand

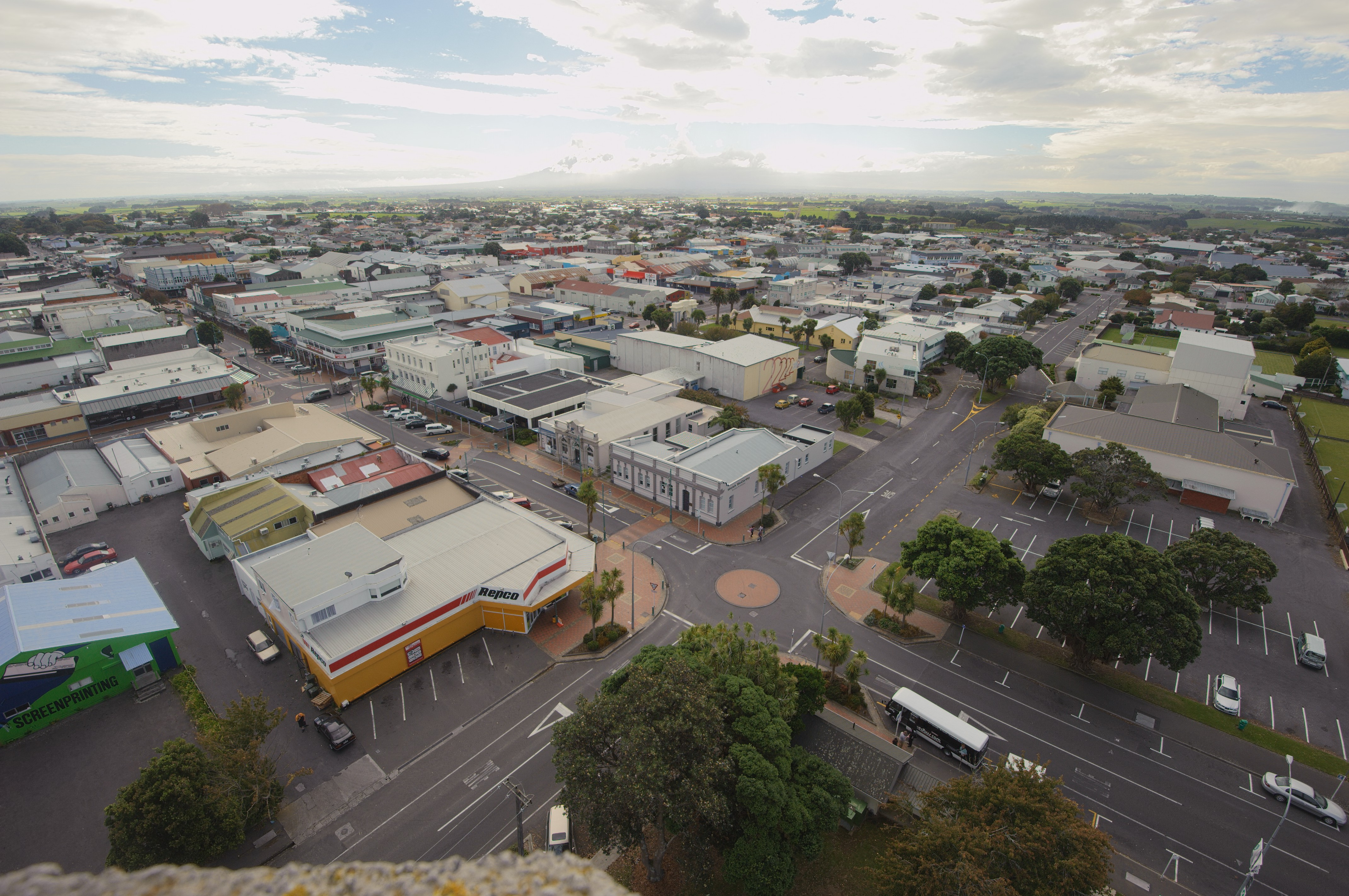
- Hāwera from the Water Tower
- Interactive map of Hāwera
- Coordinates: 39°35′36″S 174°16′42″E
- Country: New Zealand
- Region: Taranaki
- Territorial authority: South Taranaki District
- Ward: Te Hāwera General Ward; Te Kūrae Māori Ward; Te Tai Tonga Māori Ward
- Community: Te Hāwera Community
- Established: 1870
- Electorates: Whanganui; Te Tai Hauāuru (Māori)

Government
  - Territorial Authority: South Taranaki District Council
  - Regional council: Taranaki Regional Council
  - Mayor of South Taranaki: Phil Nixon
  - Whanganui MP: Carl Bates
  - Te Tai Hauāuru MP: Debbie Ngarewa-Packer

Area
  - Total: 25.18 km^{2} (9.72 sq mi)

Population (June 2025)
  - Total: 10,700
  - Density: 425/km^{2} (1,100/sq mi)
- Postcode: 4610

Hāwera is the second-largest centre in the Taranaki region of New Zealand's North Island, with a population of 10,700. It is near the coast of the South Taranaki Bight. The origins of the town lie in a government military base that was established in 1866, and the town of Hāwera grew up around a blockhouse in the early 1870s.

Hāwera is 75 km (47 mi) south of New Plymouth on State Highway 3 and 30 minutes' drive from Mount Taranaki. It is located on State Highway 45, known as Surf Highway 45 for its numerous surf beaches. State Highway 45 passes through Manaia, Ōpunake and Oakura en route to New Plymouth. Kaponga is a 20-minute drive to the north-west. The Marton–New Plymouth Line railway passes through Hāwera and has served the town since 1 August 1881, though it has been freight-only since the cancellation of the last railcar passenger service between Wellington and New Plymouth on 30 July 1977.

== Etymology ==
Te Hāwera, the namesake of the town, was a kāinga located at Whareroa. The name ("burnt place") refers to the kāinga burning to the ground after an attack. The name was first adopted by European settlers for the name of the Hawera Redoubt, a defensive fort constructed in 1866 during the New Zealand Wars. Spelt "Hawera" for most of its European history, a macron was added to the official name by the New Zealand Geographic Board in June 2019. Te Rūnanga o Ngāti Ruanui, who represent Ngāti Ruanui, the mana whenua of the area, occasionally use the Taranaki dialect spelling ‘Āwera.

The modern location of central Hāwera was traditionally known as Te Ūpoko, which was used as a site for gardens and cultivations. Taupatatea or Tau-patatē, a pā site located in eastern Hāwera, is named after the patatē, or seven-finger tree Schefflera digitata.

== Geography ==
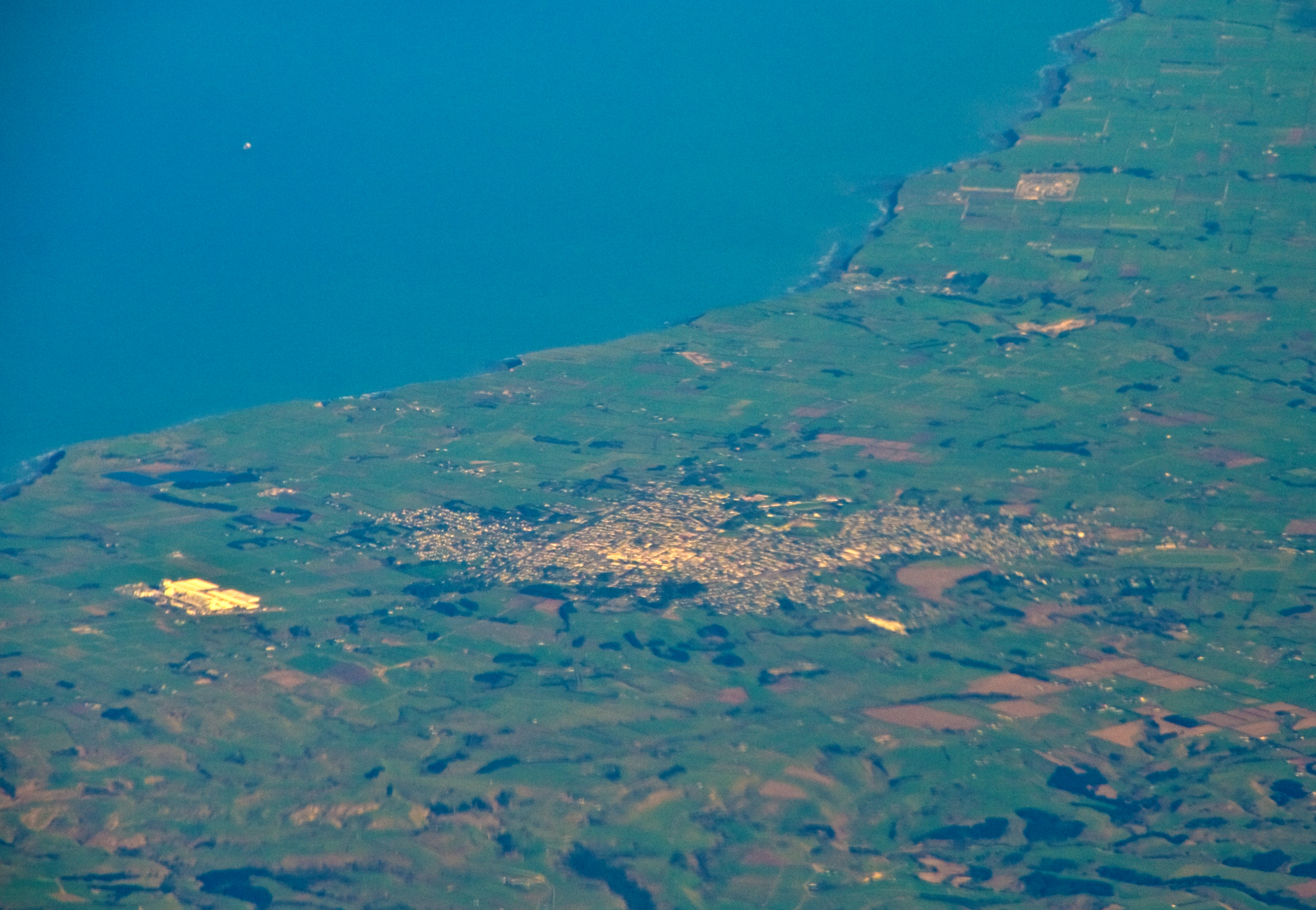
Aerial view of Hāwera, including the surrounding agricultural landscape and the Whareroa Dairy Factory.

Hāwera is located on the eastern Waimate Plains, approximately 3 km (1.9 mi) inland from the South Taranaki Bight. The town is built primarily on level or gently sloping land, with Mount Taranaki found to the north-northwest, and the hilly Tarere Range to the northeast. Hāwera is located between the Waingongoro River to the west, and the Tawhiti Stream, a tributary of the Tangahoe River, to the east. Much of the coastline near Hāwera is formed by steep cliffs, such as those found at Ōhawe Beach and Waihi Beach.

The Tangahoe Formation, a geological formation primarily formed by muddy sandstones, is exposed in the cliffs near Hāwera. The formation dates to the Waipipian stage of the mid-Pliocene (between 3.4-3.0 million years ago). Numerous Pliocene fossil species have been found near Hāwera in the formation, including Coluzea spectabilis, Emarginula haweraensis, Penion haweraensis and Saccella waihiana.

Prior to Māori settlement, the Hāwera area was likely covered in dense forest. Until the late 19th century, the Hāwera area was primarily scrubland vegetated with ferns and flax, bordering on a dense forest dominated by rātā and miro trees. In more recent times, farmland surrounds Hāwera, primarily dairy farms and sheep stations.

Towns that are close to Hāwera include Eltham, 21 km (13 mi) to the north) and, Pātea, 27 km (17 mi) to the southeast. The largest city close to Hāwera is New Plymouth, located approximately 74 km (46 mi) to the north, followed by Whanganui, found 90 km (56 mi) to the southeast. Hāwera is located on State Highway 3, State Highway 45, and is located on the Marton–New Plymouth Railway Line. Passenger services last operated on the line in 1977.

=== Climate ===
Climate data for Hawera (1991–2020 normals, extremes 2004–present)
Month	Jan	Feb	Mar	Apr	May	Jun	Jul	Aug	Sep	Oct	Nov	Dec	Year
Record high °C (°F)	30.7 (87.3)	28.3 (82.9)	26.2 (79.2)	24.2 (75.6)	21.4 (70.5)	18.7 (65.7)	19.0 (66.2)	19.3 (66.7)	20.0 (68.0)	22.9 (73.2)	23.4 (74.1)	25.8 (78.4)	30.7 (87.3)
Mean maximum °C (°F)	25.8 (78.4)	25.7 (78.3)	24.8 (76.6)	21.8 (71.2)	19.4 (66.9)	16.9 (62.4)	16.1 (61.0)	16.3 (61.3)	18.3 (64.9)	19.9 (67.8)	21.7 (71.1)	23.7 (74.7)	26.7 (80.1)
Mean daily maximum °C (°F)	20.7 (69.3)	21.3 (70.3)	19.9 (67.8)	17.6 (63.7)	15.4 (59.7)	13.2 (55.8)	12.3 (54.1)	13.0 (55.4)	14.1 (57.4)	15.5 (59.9)	16.9 (62.4)	19.2 (66.6)	16.6 (61.9)
Daily mean °C (°F)	16.7 (62.1)	17.1 (62.8)	15.7 (60.3)	13.6 (56.5)	11.6 (52.9)	9.7 (49.5)	8.7 (47.7)	9.3 (48.7)	10.6 (51.1)	12.0 (53.6)	13.2 (55.8)	15.4 (59.7)	12.8 (55.1)
Mean daily minimum °C (°F)	12.7 (54.9)	12.8 (55.0)	11.4 (52.5)	9.6 (49.3)	7.9 (46.2)	6.2 (43.2)	5.1 (41.2)	5.6 (42.1)	7.1 (44.8)	8.5 (47.3)	9.5 (49.1)	11.7 (53.1)	9.0 (48.2)
Mean minimum °C (°F)	6.8 (44.2)	6.6 (43.9)	4.6 (40.3)	2.4 (36.3)	0.8 (33.4)	−0.4 (31.3)	−1.2 (29.8)	−0.6 (30.9)	0.6 (33.1)	1.8 (35.2)	2.9 (37.2)	5.7 (42.3)	−1.9 (28.6)
Record low °C (°F)	4.1 (39.4)	3.7 (38.7)	0.3 (32.5)	0.4 (32.7)	−1.2 (29.8)	−3.3 (26.1)	−4.4 (24.1)	−2.4 (27.7)	−2.7 (27.1)	−1.1 (30.0)	−0.2 (31.6)	3.5 (38.3)	−4.4 (24.1)
Average rainfall mm (inches)	70.7 (2.78)	60.7 (2.39)	71.1 (2.80)	104.7 (4.12)	104.1 (4.10)	116.6 (4.59)	117.3 (4.62)	105.2 (4.14)	102.4 (4.03)	105.9 (4.17)	91.7 (3.61)	98.9 (3.89)	1,149.3 (45.24)
Source: NIWA

== History ==
=== Early Māori history ===
Major Māori sites near Hāwera
1 Rangatapu and Ōhawe Pā
2 Okahutiti
3 Pukeoha
4 Te Ramanui
5 Ketemarae
6 Turuturu Mōkai
7 Taupatatea Pa
8 Te Hāwera
9 Matangārara
10 Taiporohēnui
11 Waokena
12 Keteonetea
13 Te Ruaki
14 Ōhangai
15 Manawapou
16 Otāpawa

The Hāwera area has been settled by Māori since the Archaic period of Māori history. The mouth of the Waingongoro River is the location of an early archaeological site dating to the Archaic period, c. 1300, where bones of animals including moa and the North Island takahē have been found in an earthen oven. Māori gradually cleared the forest near the coast for cultivations and gardens, leading to an entirely clear stretch of scrub-land around the coast likely around the 16th century.

The earliest migration canoes attested in oral histories include the Ariki-mai-tai which landed near Waimate, Tahiti near Ōeo, Te Rangi-ua-mutu (also known as Tairea) whuch landed at the mouth of the Waingongoro River, Te Wakaringaringa at Kaupokonui, Panga-toru and Motumotu-ahi. The mana whenua of the Hāwera area is Ngāti Ruanui, whose rohe extends from the Waingongoro River in the west to the Whenuakura River in the south. While related to earlier waka including Te Rangi-ua-mutu, Ngāti Ruanui and the closely related iwi Ngāruahine and Ngā Rauru, primarily trace descent from the ancestors Turi and Rongorongo, voyagers who travelled aboard the Aotea migatory canoe to New Zealand from Mahaʻena at Tahiti and Raʻiātea in the Society Islands. Ngāti Ruanui take their name from Ruanui, a son of Turi and Rongorongo's daughter Tāneroroa, who wed Uenuku-Puanake, of the Tākitimu waka. Several place names in the area refer to Turi, including the Waingongoro River, which refers to the place where Turi snored.

Major resources for early Māori settlement include shellfish collected from the coast, fishing grounds near the mouths of rivers, eel fishing in streams, and forest resources including birds. Hapū of the area would preserve meats in the fat of the animals, which was used as a trading resource with other hapū. The modern location of central Hāwera was traditionally known as Te Ūpoko, which was used as a site for gardens and cultivations. Inter-tribal skirmishes and warfare occurred between hapū caused by issues such as fishing rights. Te Hāwera, the namesake of the town, was a kāinga located at Whareroa that was burnt to the ground in a skirmish, leading to the name "burnt place".

A well preserved pā site, Turuturu-mōkai, is located near Hāwera. Built in the 17th century by Ngāti Rakei, a hapū who later merged with Ngāti Tūpaea. Known as a strongly defended place, a traditional story tells of a feud with Ngāti Taka Ruahine tells of a ploy where members of Ngāti Taka Ruahine encourage the warriors of Turuturu-mōkai to receive tā moko (traditional tattoos) from a visiting tattoo master, then ambushing the pā site while the warriors were weakened due to receiving tattoos. Other historical pā sites include Te Ramanui, a 16th century kāinga and centre of learning centred on the current grounds of Hāwera Hospital, and Taupatatea, a pā site at Gladstone Reserve to the east of the town.

=== Early European interactions ===
In 1821 during Te Āmiowhenua, an expedition of the Musket Wars undertaken by Ngāti Whātua and Waikato Tainui, warriors led by Pōtatau Te Wherowhero besieged Te Ruaki pā for three months. Many members of Ngāti Ruanui were forcibly taken elsewhere across the country, with people returning from 1837 after peace was negotiated. Christianity was first introduced to Ngāti Ruanui by Ngātai in 1837, who returned to the area from Hokianga after becoming a Christian. Wesleyan missionaries began to arrive in the area from 1839. The largest settlement in the 1840s near Hāwera was Manawapou, on the coast to the southeast of Hāwera at the mouth of the Tangahoe River.

European settlement of Taranaki began in 1841, with the establishment of New Plymouth. In March 1843, the road from Pātea to Whanganui was completed. Early important industries in the area included flax harvesting, pig rearing, and wheat growing. By the late 1840s, 50 acres (20 ha) of wheat had been planted at Ōhangai, and many Māori-operated flour mills were established in the area, with the first being constructed at Waitoto near Okaiawa in September 1847. Flax weaving became an important industry at Manawapou in the 1850s, and larger houses had been constructed at Ōhangai by 1852. From 1853, the area became a part of the Taranaki Province.

=== Land wars ===
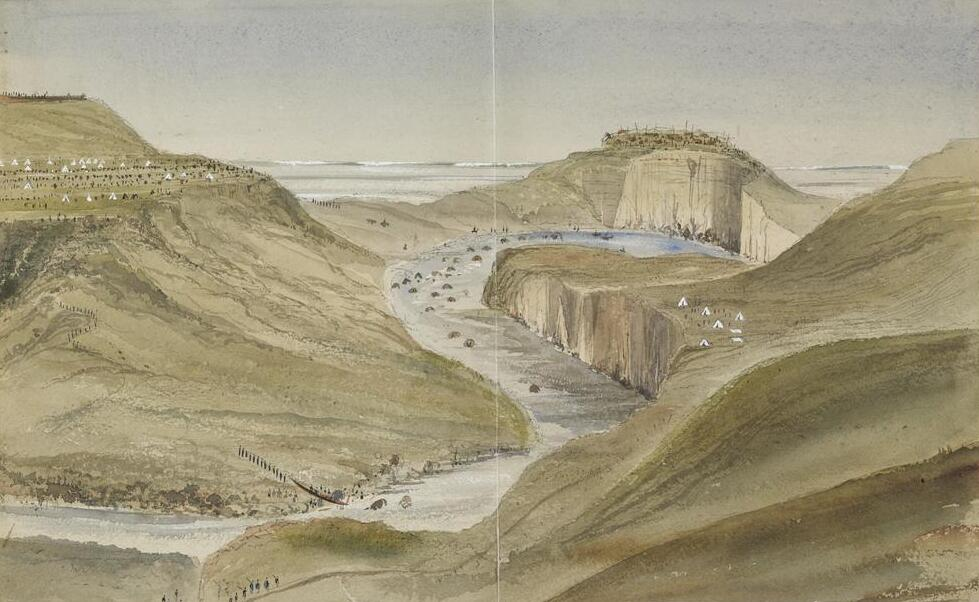
Sketch of Ohawe and the Waingongoro River mouth in 1865, showing Cameron's military redoubt next to Ohawe Pā

Since 1849, Ngāti Ruanui had opposed land sales in the Hāwera to European settlers, a position solidified during a major hui at Manawapou in April 1854. The first military clash between South Taranaki Māori and the Crown was the Battle of Waireka in March 1860. Ngāti Ruanui sought to unite with norther Taranaki iwi in this conflict, knowing that the Crown's tactics to secure land would later be used against them, and by 1862, had abandoned coastal kāinga abandoned for those at forest margins.

Governor George Grey wanted to humiliate Ngāti Ruanui for their stance opposing land sales. Land confiscations began in Northern Taranaki in 1863, and resistance to invasion was used as a justification for further land confiscations. On 2 September 1865, Grey announced that Ngāti Ruanui lands would be confiscated under the New Zealand Settlements Act 1863, except for members of the iwi who were loyal to the crown. By the mid-1860s, units of European and kūpapa soldiers under Gustavus von Tempsky began ambushing Ngāti Ruanui using "bush-scouring" tactics, destroying the economy of Ngāti Ruanui.

In 1864, Governor Grey called for the establishments of military settlements between New Plymouth and Whanganui, to open up land for settlement and to create a passable road between the two settlements. At this time, South Taranaki Māori increasingly began adopting the Pai Mārire faith. Adoption of Pai Mārire and the Māori King movement were both seen as ways for Māori to resist European aggression. Adherents of Pai Mārire, commonly referred to as Hauhaus, were seen by European settlers as fanatics, and by 1865 Governor Grey proclaimed that he would attempt to suppress Pai Mārire using any means possible.

From January to April 1865, lieutenant general Duncan Cameron reluctantly led a military campaign against South Taranaki Māori. Cameron established a military redoubt at Ohawe in 1865, and on 2 September 1865, Grey proclaimed that lands held by rebels between Whanganui and New Plymouth would be confiscated. In January 1866, Trevor Chute led a second campaign, adopting a scorched earth tactic, destroying the kāinga of Manawapou, Ōtāpawa, Keteonetea and Puketi, and established a number of military redoubts in the area, including the Waihi Redoubt, the main military base, in September, and a redoubt at Turuturu-mōkai.

=== Establishment of Hāwera and Tītokowaru's War ===
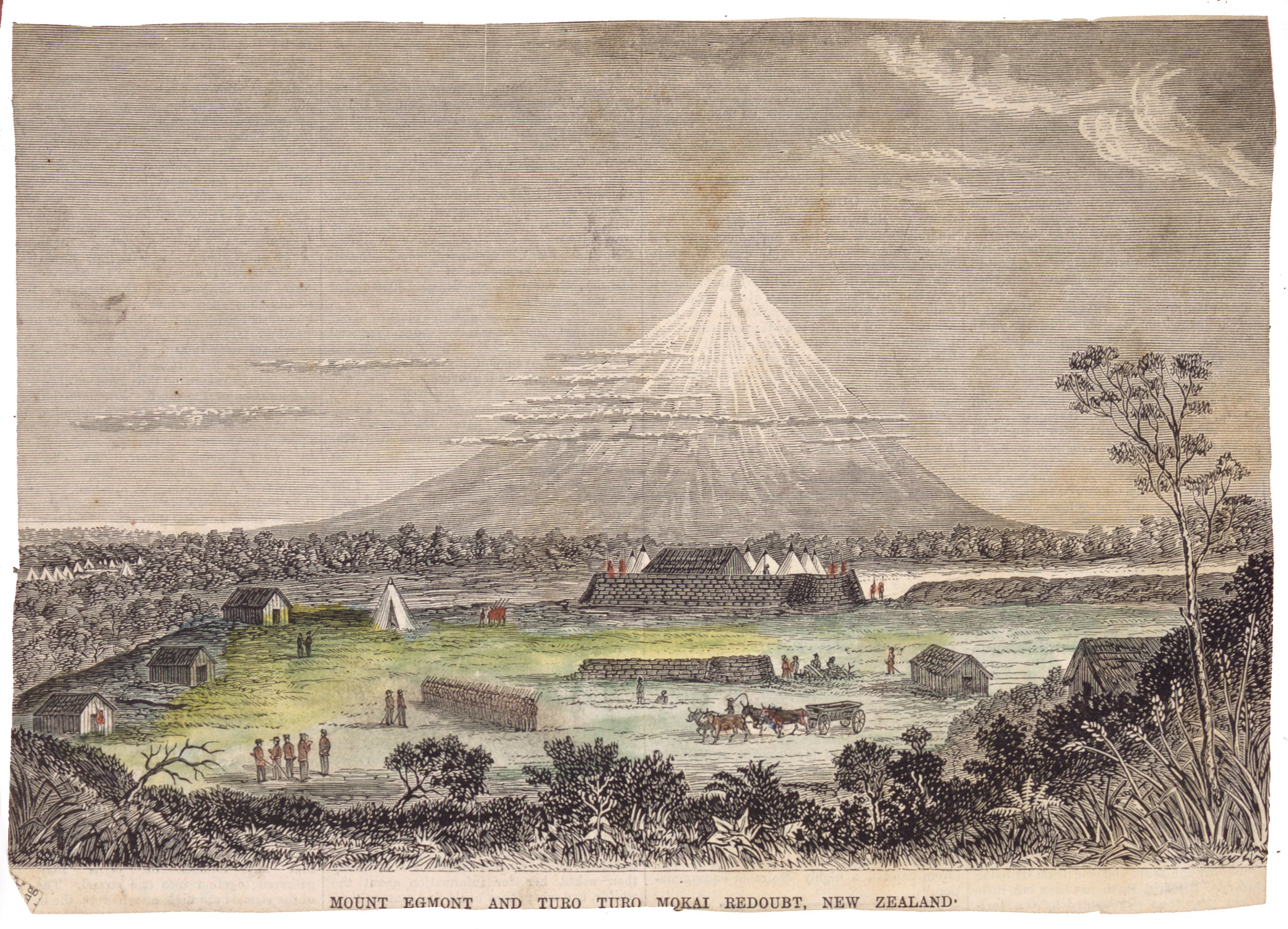
Wood engraving of the Turuturu-mōkai Redoubt, c. 1860s

On 30 April 1866, Percy Smith began surveying military settlements in the South Taranaki area. Originally Ohawe was intended to be developed as the main town for the area instead of Hāwera. The first references to Hāwera date to 1866, referring to Camp Hawera redoubt. Hāwera is marked as a redoubt located near Whareroa in James Orme Barnard's 1868 map of the coast between the Waingongoro and Whanganui rivers.

Settlers began arriving in the area in 1886, with townships being established at Ohawe, Mokoia, and Kakaramea. Guerilla warfare ambushes by South Taranaki Māori hindered settlement, with an estimation of only 10% of settlers remaining by later 1867. Ngāti Ruahia attempted to seek peace with the Government in 1866, during which Government troops attacked settlements at Pōkaikai in August and Ketemarae in September. In 1867, Taranaki rangatira Tītokowaru began training followers at Te-Ngutu-o-te-Manu, a fortified village close by to Waihi Redoubt, where many South Taranaki Māori regrouped after land confiscations.

The earliest European settlers came to in Hāwera in 1867, arriving from Pātea, then the major gateway to the area. These included Robert Middlemass and his wife, immigrants from Canada, who constructed a sod fort they called Canada Redoubt near the eastern end of Iredale Road. Other early immigrants included William Douglas, Middlemass' son-in-law, James Livingston, and his cousin James McMichael, who both arrived in 1868. Tītokowaru's followers undertook a passive resistance campaign against the settlers in 1867 and 1868. By mid-1868, military conflict between Tītokowaru's followers and Government troops began. Known as Tītokowaru's War, major conflicts included the 12 July 1868 attack on Turuturu-mōkai Redoubt, and the attacks on Te Ngutu o Te Manu on between August and September. Tītokowaru's military triumphs, which included the death of commander Gustavus von Tempsky, led to Government soldiers to retreat from the area, and caused intense panic among European settlers. Settlers returned to the Hāwera area in March 1869 after the hostilities had ended.

A blockhouse to protect settlers was constructed on 16 February 1870, and with the town developing around the blockhouse. Ngāti Ruanui gradually returned to cultivations near Hāwera in 1871, while farms were being developed near the town, east of the Waingongoro River. Cobbs coach first began operating stage coaches to Hāwera in January 1871.

=== Early colonial era ===
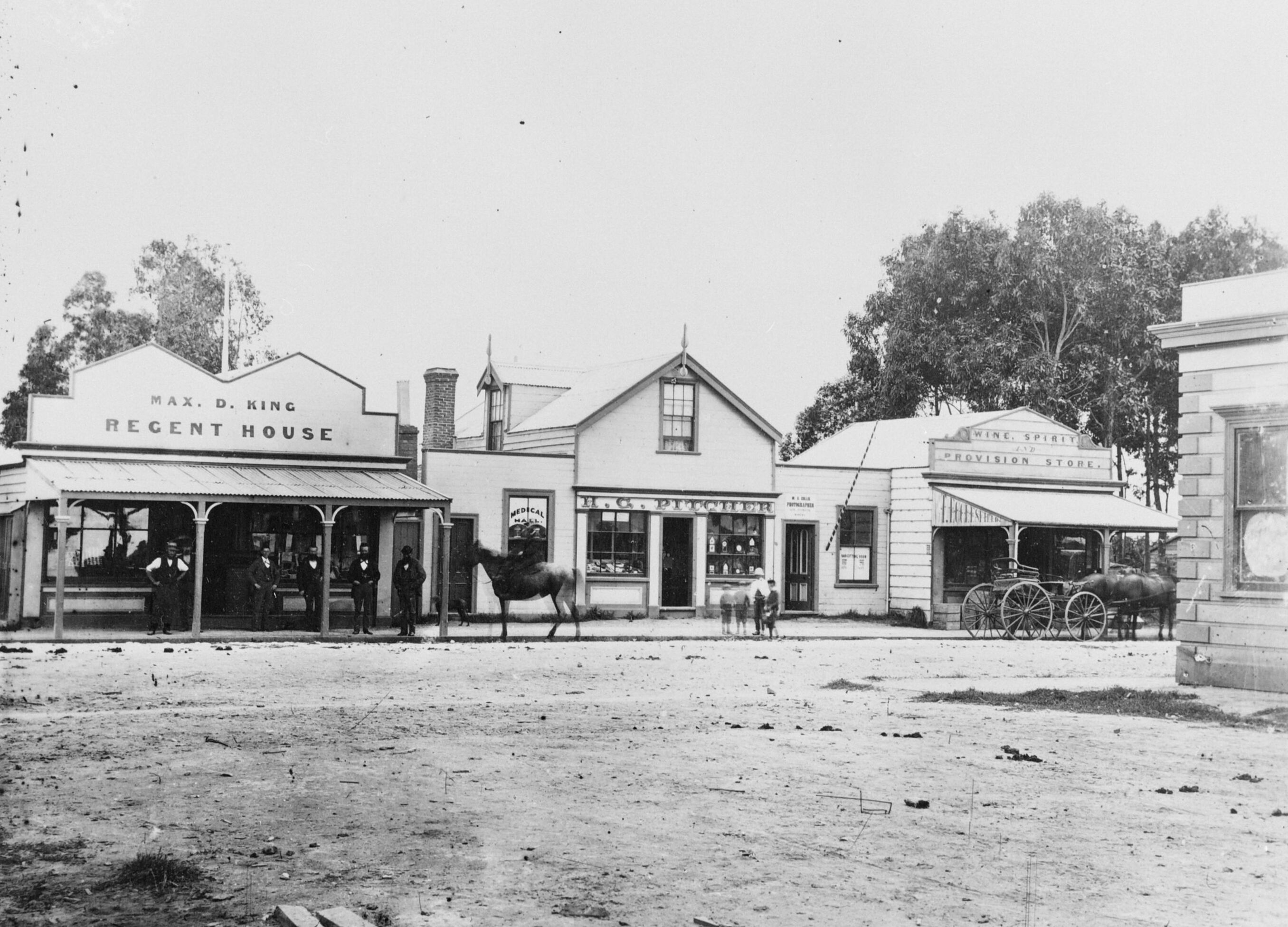
Hāwera in the early 1880s

In October 1875, a meeting was held at the Hāwera Blockhouse, which defined the town boundaries of Hāwera, and led to an application to the Government to establish the Hawera Town Board. The first school in Hāwera was established in May 1875. Early settlers tilled the Waimate Plains to create farmland, quickly realising that the land was best suited for dairy farming and cattle raising.

In 1879, Hāwera settlers became worried about potential attacks by Taranaki Māori. In June 1879, spiritual leader Te Whiti o Rongomai of Parihaka led a non-violent campaign against settlers in South Taranaki, involving protests where ploughmen arrived on settlers' lands, creating long furrows in the land as a protest against the Government's silence on land confiscations. In response, Hāwera settlers formed a volunteer militia as a temporary measure, while waiting for aid from the government. This militia operated until July 1879, and was jokingly named the "Republic of Hawera" by the Wanganui Herald. Many Ngāti Ruanui dispossessed from lands lived at Parihaka, the centre of Te Whiti's non-violent resistance campaign. The village was attacked by government forces on 5 November 1881, crushing the movement. Small parcels of land were returned to Ngāti Ruanui by the West Coast Commissions in the mid-1880s, often under the control of trusts, and held in perpetually renewable leases to farmers.

=== Rise of agriculture and fires ===
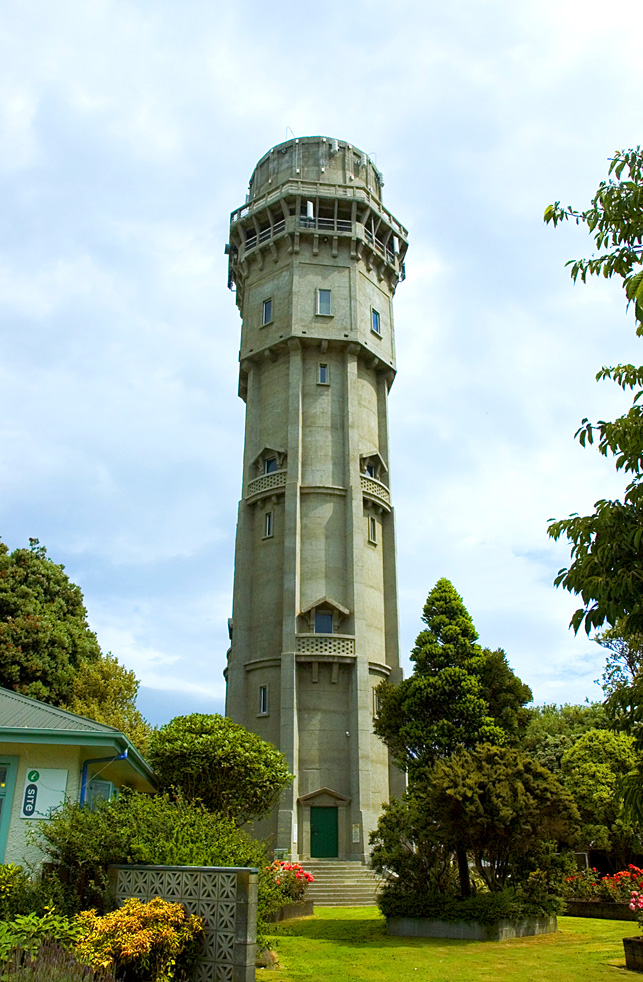
The Hāwera Water Tower

Hāwera developed into a major commercial centre for South Taranaki in the 1880s, due to the construction of Patea Freezing Works and the development of refrigerated shipping meaning that South Taranaki produce could be easily exported overseas. The town was connected by rail to New Plymouth on 20 October 1881, with the line to the south to Foxton opening on 23 March 1885. The Hawera Star was first published in 1880, and in 1882, the town became a borough. Many settlers came to South Taranaki from dairying areas of Britain, and dairy factories were established across South Taranaki by the mid-1890s. The first Hawera A&P Show was held in 1888. By the 1880s, Hāwera had outpaced Pātea in becoming the largest settlement and main centre of South Taranaki.

The developing town was primarily made of wooden buildings. Major fires occurred in Hāwera included the Empire Hotel fire of 5 July 1884 and the Robbins and Pierards grocery store fire of 7 July 1888. The Great Fire of Hāwera happened on 30 August 1895, leading to two deaths and 17 buildings on High Street being destroyed. By 1896, the town centre was reconstructed and revitalised with new two-storey buildings.

The first Hāwera public baths were opened in 1902, as well as King Edward Park, a large recreational ground in town. Electric lights were first used in the town in 1904, and the first motorcars were use in Hāwera in 1905.

After the Central Hotel fire on 28 April 1912, the town decided to construct the Hāwera Water Tower to combat future fires, as there was no central water feature in the town. Completed in 1914, the tower was never needed to be used for fire fighting. The town was significantly financially impacted during World War I, the 1918 influenza epidemic and the Great Depression of the 1930s, having mostly recovered by 1936.

The Hawera Aerodrome opened on 29 April 1938 by Bob Semple, Minister of Works.

=== Modern day ===
Hāwera underwent a population boom after World War II, when new suburbs were added to the town. By the 1950s, the Māori population of Hāwera increased, as many people were drawn to find manufacturing work. By 1951, the population of the town was 5,342, increasing to 7,537 by 1961. By the 1960s, the town had developed numerous manufacturing and processing businesses, including milk factories and equipment suppliers.

In 1963, the Joll Co-operative Dairy Company, Kaupokonui Dairy Company, eight factories and 268 suppliers merged to form Kiwi Cooperative Dairies, becoming the second largest dairy company in New Zealand. On 30 August 1973, the Whareroa Kiwi Co-Op Dairy Factory was opened near Hāwera. Now the Fonterra Whareroa dairy factory, the complex is the largest single-site dairy factory in New Zealand and the Southern Hemisphere. During the 1960s, the Kapuni Natural Gas Complex was developed near Hāwera. In 1969, the Maui gas field was discovered off-shore from Hāwera.

In 1988, Tawhiti Museum was opened on the outskirts of the town. A large scale sports, events and function centre, the TSB Hub, was opened in Hāwera in 2010.

== Demography ==
Stats NZ describes Hāwera as a small urban area, which covers 25.18 km^{2} (9.72 sq mi). It had an estimated population of 10,700 as of June 2025, with a population density of 425 people per km^{2}.

Historical population
Year	Pop.	±% p.a.
2006	8,817	—
2013	9,129	+0.50%
2018	9,792	+1.41%
2023	10,365	+1.14%

Hāwera had a population of 10,365 in the 2023 New Zealand census, an increase of 573 people (5.9%) since the 2018 census, and an increase of 1,236 people (13.5%) since the 2013 census. There were 5,049 males, 5,271 females, and 39 people of other genders in 4,014 dwellings. 2.5% of people identified as LGBTIQ+. The median age was 40.4 years (compared with 38.1 years nationally). There were 2,076 people (20.0%) aged under 15 years, 1,737 (16.8%) aged 15 to 29, 4,341 (41.9%) aged 30 to 64, and 2,208 (21.3%) aged 65 or older.

People could identify as more than one ethnicity. The results were 77.5% European (Pākehā); 29.0% Māori; 3.4% Pasifika; 5.8% Asian; 0.6% Middle Eastern, Latin American and African New Zealanders (MELAA); and 2.7% other, which includes people giving their ethnicity as "New Zealander". English was spoken by 97.2%, Māori by 6.4%, Samoan by 0.8%, and other languages by 5.4%. No language could be spoken by 1.8% (e.g. too young to talk). New Zealand Sign Language was known by 0.5%. The percentage of people born overseas was 11.9, compared with 28.8% nationally.

Religious affiliations were 32.9% Christian, 1.3% Hindu, 0.6% Islam, 1.6% Māori religious beliefs, 0.3% Buddhist, 0.3% New Age, and 1.0% other religions. People who answered that they had no religion were 53.4%, and 8.7% of people did not answer the census question.

Of those at least 15 years old, 861 (10.4%) people had a bachelor's or higher degree, 4,719 (56.9%) had a post-high school certificate or diploma, and 2,706 (32.6%) people exclusively held high school qualifications. The median income was $35,800, compared with $41,500 nationally. 639 people (7.7%) earned over $100,000 compared to 12.1% nationally. The employment status of those at least 15 was 3,891 (46.9%) full-time, 948 (11.4%) part-time, and 270 (3.3%) unemployed.

Individual statistical areas
Name	Area (km^{2})	Population	Density (per km^{2})	Dwellings	Median age	Median income
Hāwera West	4.38	1,911	436	729	40.9 years	$42,400
Turuturu	4.33	1,983	458	759	37.4 years	$39,800
King Edward Park	1.08	1,635	1,514	600	40.0 years	$33,700
Ramanui	13.61	2,178	160	786	40.9 years	$34,000
Hāwera Central	1.78	2,655	1,492	1,146	42.5 years	$31,400
New Zealand					38.1 years	$41,500

== Economy ==
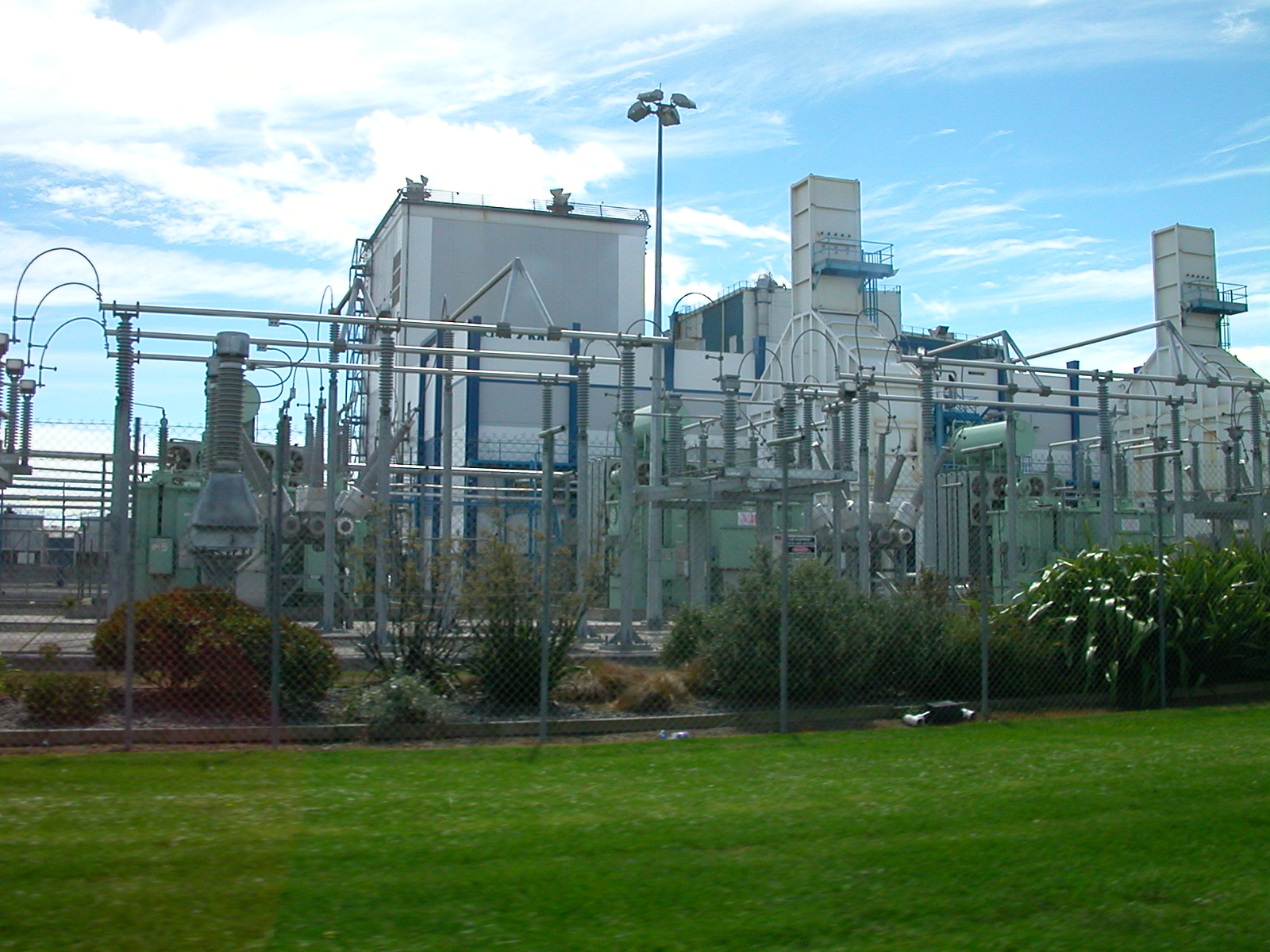
Fonterra Whareroa dairy factory

=== Dairy industry ===
The cornerstone of Hāwera's economy is the dairy industry. The Whareroa Dairy Factory, located approximately 4 km southeast of the township, was once the largest dairy-production site in the world. The complex is currently owned by Fonterra, having been built by the Kiwi Co-operative Dairies, whose original plant opened on the site in 1975.

During peak season, the complex employs around 1,000 staff members and processes up to 14 million litres of milk. The site also features a gas-fired power plant that supplies electricity and heat for dairy. Excess electricity from the plant is fed into the national power grid.

=== Cultural attractions ===
Hāwera is home to the Tawhiti Museum. The museum is known for its handcrafted life-sized figures and scale models. Exhibits in the museum portray the cultural history and heritage of the region. The museum's displays include detailed recreations of local Māori pā sites. Exhibit provide educational insight into the historical lifestyles and structures of the indigenous community. The historical significance of such sites is exemplified by the Turuturu-Mokai complex.

== Marae ==
There are four marae in the Hāwera area:

- Ngātiki Pa, is affiliated with Taanga’oe Hapū of Hāmua and Hawe.
- Te Rangatapu Marae and its Aorangi meeting house are affiliated with the Ngāruahine hapū of Kanihi-Umutahi and Ōkahu-Inuāwai.
- Taiporohēnui Marae and its Whareroa meeting house are affiliated with the Ngāti Ruanui hapū of Hāmua and Hāpōtiki.
- Wharepuni Marae and its Tūpaia meeting house are affiliated with the Ngāti Ruanui hapū of Ngāti Tānewai and Ngāti Tūpaea.

In October 2020, the Government committed $1,479,479 from the Provincial Growth Fund to renovate Meremere Marae, Ketemarae Pā, Pariroa Marae and Taiporohēnui Marae, creating 35 jobs.

== Education ==
Hāwera Primary School was established in 1875. It developed into a District High School in 1901. Hāwera High School opened as Hāwera Technical High School in 1919, and moved to a new site in 1921. The intermediate school opened in 1961. In October 2021, it was announced that Hāwera High School and Hāwera Intermediate would be closing at the end of 2022. A new, years 7–13 school, Te Paepae o Aotea, was created on the former Hāwera High School campus at the beginning of 2023. Te Paepae o Aotea is a secondary school for years 7 to 13 with a roll of 867.

The Western Institute of Technology at Taranaki has a campus in Hāwera, established in 1990.

Hāwera Primary School, Ramanui School, Tawhiti School and Turuturu School are contributing primary (years 1–6) schools with rolls of 162, 62, 278 and 273 respectively. Hāwera Primary celebrated its 150th jubilee in 2025. Ramanui School celebrated its 50th jubilee in 2003. Tawhiti School was established in 1920. Turuturu School opened in 1927.

Hāwera Christian School and St Joseph's School are state integrated full primary (years 1–8) schools with rolls of 50 and 204 respectively. Hāwera Christian School, originally Belmont Christian Academy, was acquired by the NZ Christian Proprietors Trust in 2013, and moved to a leased site in Hāwera, and again to a new site in 2024–2025. St Joseph's opened in 1875.

Te Kura Kaupapa Māori o Ngati Ruanui is a full primary (years 1–8) school with a roll of 139. It is a Kura Kaupapa Māori school which teaches in the Māori language. It opened in 1998.

All these schools are coeducational. Rolls are as of July 2026.

== Local government ==
The County of Hawera was established on 28 July 1881, followed by the establishment of the Hawera Borough, which administered the town itself, on 5 January 1882. In addition, the Hawera Road Board operated between 1872 and 1888, collected taxes to construct roads in South Taranaki, until it was merged with Hawera County in 1888. The County of Hawera was gradually reduced in size with the establishment of neighbouring counties, including Stratford County in 1898, Egmont County in 1892 and Eltham County formed in 1906. After discussions that had been held since 1968, Hawera County and Hawera Borough were merged in 1978 to form Hawera District. In 1989, the Hawera District was merged with the surrounding local government bodies to form the South Taranaki District.

After serving four terms as mayor of South Taranaki, Ross Dunlop did not stand in the 2019 election, and was replaced as mayor by District Councillor Phil Nixon.

Between 1882 and 1989, Hāwera had 20 mayors. The following is a complete list:

	Name	Portrait	Term of office
Hawera Borough Council
1	Felix McGuire		1882–1883
2	George Victor Bate		1883–1884
3	William Joseph Furlong		1885–1886
4	Charles Edwin Major		1886–1888
5	James Davidson		1886–1888
(4)	Charles Edwin Major		1892–1896
6	Henry William Sutton		1896–1897
(4)	Charles Edwin Major		1897–1901
7	Benjamin Conrad Robbins		1902–1905
8	James William Hirst		1906
(7)	Benjamin Conrad Robbins		1907
(6)	Henry William Sutton		1908–1909
9	Elliot L'Estrange Barton		1910–1911
10	Hugh Knight Whittington		1911
11	Arthur William Gillies		1912–1913
(10)	Hugh Knight Whittington		1914
12	Edwin Dixon		1915–1923
13	Leonard Alfred Bone		1923–1925
14	Ernest Arthur Pacey		1925–1933
15	James Ernest Campbell		1925–1933
16	Laurence Hugh Clapham		1939–1953
17	Frederick William Finer		1953–1971
18	George Alexander Taylor		1971–1977
19	Bruce Edward Murray		1977–1978
Hawera District Council
(19)	Bruce Edward Murray		1978–1983
20	Henry Noel Johnston		1983–1989

== Notable people ==
- Aroha Awarau, journalist
- Michael Bent, rugby player
- Pat Booth, investigative journalist
- Chester Borrows, National Party Member of Parliament
- Cameron Brewer, Auckland councillor
- Alan Brough, actor and comedian
- Gayle Broughton, rugby union player
- Michael Campbell, professional golfer
- Tim Chadwick, artist and author
- Geoffrey Duncan Chisholm, surgeon
- Fanny Good (1860–1950), painter and botanical illustrator
- John Gildroy Grant, World War I Victoria Cross recipient
- Wayne Gould, populariser of sudoku
- Doug Harris, runner
- Ben Hurley, comedian and cricket commentator
- Peter Ingram, cricket player
- Nicola Kawana, actress
- Fiona Kidman, writer
- Issac Luke, rugby league player
- John Mitchell, rugby union player and coach
- Ronald Hugh Morrieson, author
- Debbie Ngarewa-Packer, Māori Party member of parliament
- Alan Stuart Paterson, cartoonist
- John Plumtree, rugby union player and coach
- Conrad Smith, All Black rugby union player
- Elijah Taylor, rugby league player
- Adine Wilson, Silver Ferns netballer

== Bibliography ==
- Bromley, A. P. C. (1981). Hawera District Centenary. Centennial Committee of the Hawera District Council.
- Churchman, Geoffrey B; Hurst, Tony (2001) [1990, 1991]. The Railways of New Zealand: A Journey through History (Second ed.). Transpress New Zealand. ISBN 0-908876-20-3.
- Fryer, Arthur (1995). Hawera's On Fire. Hawera Historical Society. ISBN 0-473-03339-9.
- Hawera Star (1983). A Pictorial History of Hawera, 1882–1982. Hawera Star Publishing.
- Sole, Tony (2005). Ngāti Ruanui: a History. Wellington: Huia Publishers. ISBN 1-86969-180-6.

== See also ==
- Hāwera Observatory
