= Otakeho =

Settlement in Taranaki Region, New Zealand

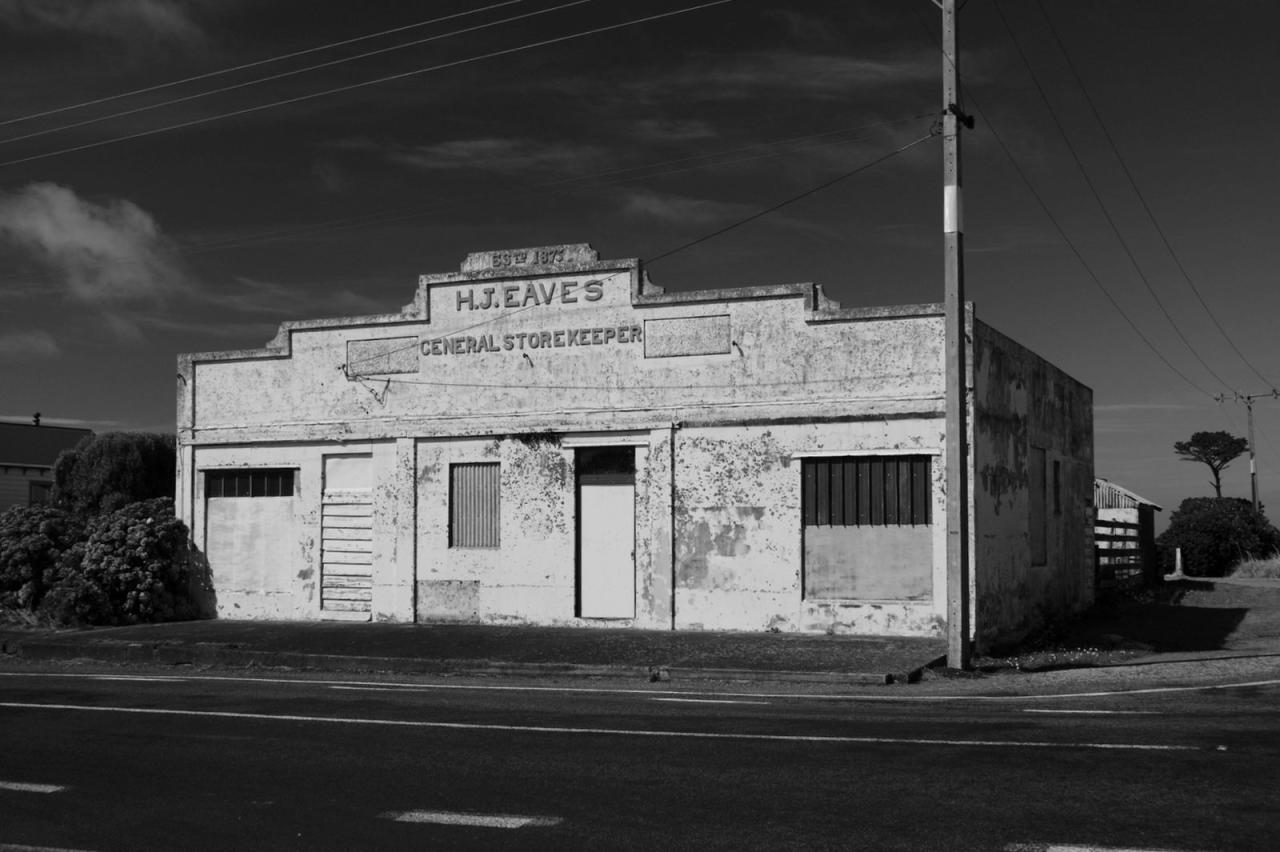
- 1928 store of Hubert James Eaves
- Interactive map of Otakeho
- Coordinates: 39.549°S 174.040°E
- Country: New Zealand
- Region: Taranaki
- Territorial authority: South Taranaki District
- Ward: Taranaki Coastal General Ward; Eltham-Kaponga General Ward; Te Kūrae Māori Ward
- Community: Taranaki Coastal Community; Eltham-Kaponga Community
- Electorates: Whanganui; Te Tai Hauāuru (Māori)

Government
  - Territorial Authority: South Taranaki District Council
  - Regional council: Taranaki Regional Council
  - Mayor of South Taranaki: Phil Nixon
  - Whanganui MP: Carl Bates
  - Te Tai Hauāuru MP: Debbie Ngarewa-Packer

Area
  - Total: 31.46 km^{2} (12.15 sq mi)

Population (2023 Census)
  - Total: 177
  - Density: 5.63/km^{2} (14.6/sq mi)

Otakeho, meaning place of Takeho, is a locality in southern Taranaki, New Zealand, west of the Otakeho Stream (rising on Mount Taranaki and reaching the Tasman Sea at Otakeho. It is on SH45.

It has a hall (built in 1897 to celebrate Queen Victoria's Diamond Jubilee), a boarded up store (taken over by H J Eaves in 1904, when it sold a wide variety of groceries, ironmongery, drapery, boots, farm, garden, sporting and household goods. It burnt down in July 1927 and was rebuilt about April 1928) a war memorial and a few houses.

3.8 km (2.4 mi) west of Otakeho is Ngāruahine's Tawhitinui Marae. A kohanga reo has been run at the marae since the 1980s.

Otakeho has a small sandy beach, beyond Dingle Road, at the foot of 40 m (130 ft) high cliffs. It is used for fishing and has a poorly protected, nationally threatened, variety of Craspedia, Craspedia Otakeho.

The Ōpunake to New Plymouth bus runs through Otakeho daily in each direction, except at weekends. A bus has run since 1915 and was preceded by Royal Mail coaches, which changed horses there from 1881.

== History ==
Otakeho was, like Parihaka, a part of the Waimate Plains confiscated from Ngāti Ruanui under the Settlements Act 1863, so that precautions were taken during the survey of the main road in 1878. In 1880 there was a camp of No.1 Company of the Armed Constabulary at Otakeho, when the road was being built. Later in the year the confiscated land was being sold, for £16 to £24 per acre. Otakeho may have been an area where ploughing protests occurred, though it stopped on request. A phone line to Manaia was built about 1883. Otakeho Bridge was swept away by a flood in 1893. Gravel was put on the mud roads around the period 1893 to 1913.

=== Growth ===
Otakeho grew from the 1880s to the early decades of the twentieth century, becoming a much larger village than the current one, its first store, bakery and post and telegraph office being opened by Mr Blennerhasset in 1882 (his murder in a neighbours' dispute in 1901 briefly put Otakeho in the headlines). In 1883 a butcher and smithy opened, a school in 1884, a tinsmith's and in 1896 a public hall. A debating society was formed in 1891. The 1894 school closed in 2003, though the buildings remain. An 1893 Category 2 listed church was designed by Frederick de Jersey Clere, was extended with a vestry in 1954, closed in 2015, deconsecrated in 2017, sold in 2018 and moved to Pihama in 2021. The churchyard wasn't used as a burial ground. The village also had carriers, a dairy factory, which occupied several buildings and three butchers.

=== Hotel ===
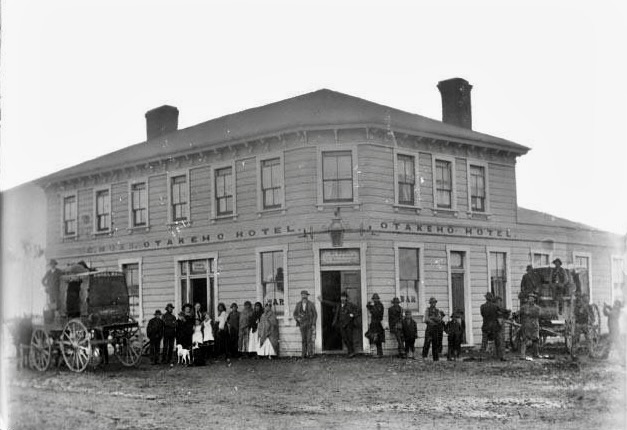
Otakeho Hotel about 1890

Tenders for the hotel were invited in 1881, building started in September 1881, and the 20-room Otakeho Hotel opened in January 1882. It was rebuilt after a 1907 fire and burnt down again in January 1980.

=== Dairy ===
In 1888 Newton King together with R. Cook and J.C. George founded the Crown Dairy Company which started by taking over three unsuccessful co-operatives at Manaia, Otakeho and Opunake.

== Demographics ==
Otakeho locality covers 31.46 km^{2} (12.15 sq mi). The locality is part of the larger Taungatara statistical area.

The population was once almost double the current total, being 75 in 1906, 314 in 1921 and 305 in 1951.

Historical population
Year	Pop.	±% p.a.
2006	219	—
2013	189	−2.08%
2018	198	+0.93%
2023	177	−2.22%

Otakeho had a population of 177 in the 2023 New Zealand census, a decrease of 21 people (−10.6%) since the 2018 census, and a decrease of 12 people (−6.3%) since the 2013 census. There were 93 males and 84 females in 66 dwellings. 3.4% of people identified as LGBTIQ+. The median age was 34.6 years (compared with 38.1 years nationally). There were 39 people (22.0%) aged under 15 years, 36 (20.3%) aged 15 to 29, 84 (47.5%) aged 30 to 64, and 18 (10.2%) aged 65 or older.

People could identify as more than one ethnicity. The results were 88.1% European (Pākehā), 23.7% Māori, 1.7% Pasifika, 1.7% Asian, and 3.4% other, which includes people giving their ethnicity as "New Zealander". English was spoken by 100.0%, Māori by 5.1%, and other languages by 3.4%. No language could be spoken by 1.7% (e.g. too young to talk). New Zealand Sign Language was known by 1.7%. The percentage of people born overseas was 10.2, compared with 28.8% nationally.

Religious affiliations were 28.8% Christian. People who answered that they had no religion were 57.6%, and 11.9% of people did not answer the census question.

Of those at least 15 years old, 12 (8.7%) people had a bachelor's or higher degree, 84 (60.9%) had a post-high school certificate or diploma, and 45 (32.6%) people exclusively held high school qualifications. The median income was $46,800, compared with $41,500 nationally. 18 people (13.0%) earned over $100,000 compared to 12.1% nationally. The employment status of those at least 15 was 78 (56.5%) full-time, 30 (21.7%) part-time, and 6 (4.3%) unemployed.

== Notable people ==
- Margaret Jane Briggs (17 April 1892 – 5 November 1961) a show‑ring rider born in Otakeho
- Sir William Hudleston le Fleming, 9th Baronet (1861–1945) member of Waimate Road Board, then Waimate West County Council (1886-1923), dairy company director, hall committee chairman for 15 years and school committee for 12 years, a director of Kaupokonui Co-operative Dairy Co for 14 years, and a member of Otakeho Farmers' Union
- Frederick Arthur Lye (1881 – 3 October 1949) a Liberal and United MP (1922-35), who farmed at Otakeho from 1906 to 1918
- William Sheridan (12 March 1858 – 16 November 1931) a Tasmanian Labour MP (1909-28), who ran a store at Otakeho, from 1900 until sold to his brother in law, H J Eaves in 1904
