= Hāwera Water Tower =

Historic water tower in Hāwera, New Zealand

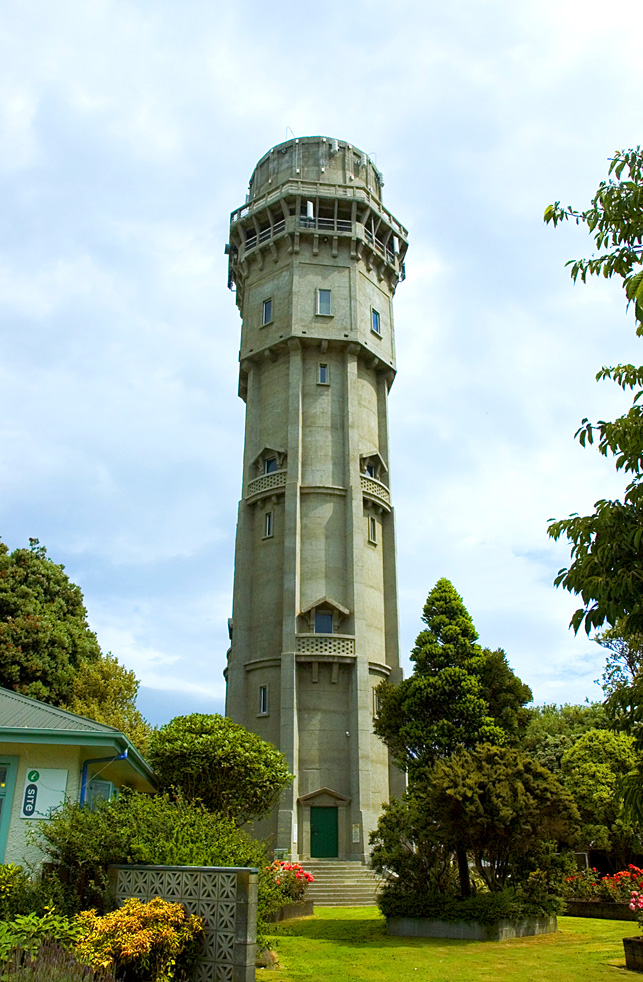
- The Hāwera Water Tower in 2005
- Interactive map of the Hāwera Water Tower area

General information
- Status: Completed
- Type: Water tower, tourism
- Location: Hāwera, South Taranaki District, New Zealand, Corner of Albion Street and High Street
- Coordinates: 39°35′24″S 174°17′06″E
- Construction started: 11 December 1912
- Completed: March 1914
- Opening: 25 March 1914; 112 years ago
- Cost: NZ£4,510
- Owner: South Taranaki District Council

Height
- Roof: 54.21 m (177.9 ft)
- Observatory: 45.72 m (150.0 ft)

Design and construction
- Architect: J.C. Cameron
- Structural engineer: S. T. Silver

Website
- www.southtaranaki.com/our-community/hawera-water-tower

Heritage New Zealand – Category 1
- Designated: 21 September 1989
- Reference no.: 0143

The Hāwera Water Tower is a concrete tower located in Hāwera in the South Taranaki District of New Zealand. Constructed in response to the 1912 Hāwera fire, the building became the tallest reinforced concrete tower in New Zealand upon its completion in 1914. The tower was used to provide residential water to the town until 1958. After being closed in the 1990s due to safety risks, the tower was renovated in 2004. The Hāwera Water Tower has become a symbol of Hāwera and the wider Taranaki Region.

== Description ==
The Hāwera Water Tower is a 54.21 m (177.9 ft)-tall reinforced concrete tower, The 7 m (23 ft) diameter tower has a cylindrical form which changes to an octagonal form at the higher reaches of the tower, and is supported for eight external buttresses. The tower originally held two water tanks holding 681,913 L (150,000 imp gal; 180,142 US gal) of water. The upper tank held twice as much water as the lower, with the upper intended for use for firefighting, and the lower tank used for household water usage. Viewing platforms are found in the upper sections of the tower.

== History ==
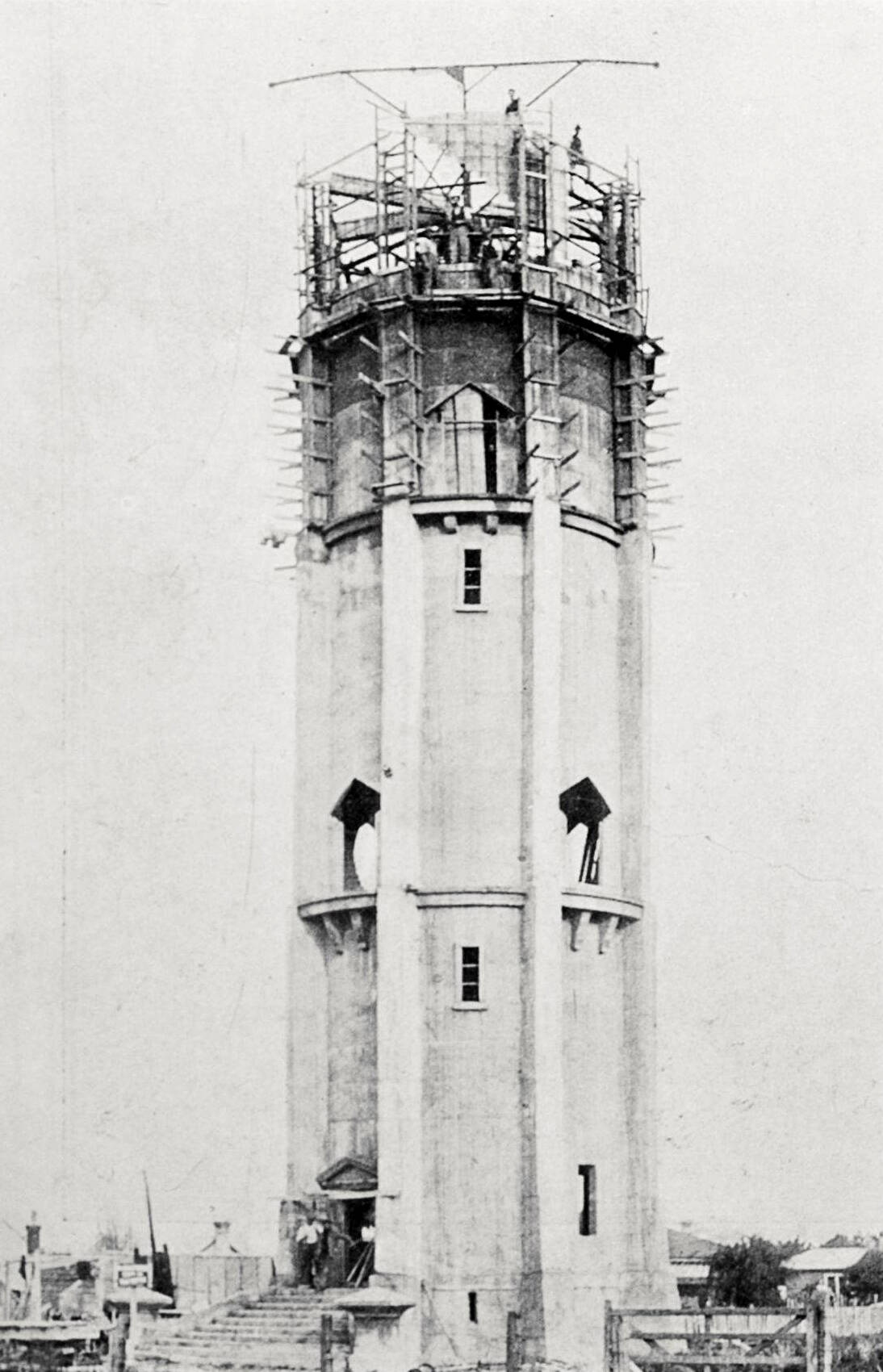
The tower under construction in 1913

The town of Hāwera experienced numerous fires in the later 19th and early 20th centuries. Major water sources such as the Tawhiti Stream and Waingongoro River were too far away from the main street of town, meaning that there was no source of high pressure water needed for firefighting. In the late 19th century, a number of wells were dug near High Street, but fires continued to impact the town. By the early 1910s, the town relied on a gravitation water supply from the Kapuni Stream for firefighting, with no reservoir found in the town.

Pressure from insurance companies led local government in Hāwera to consider options to address the problem after the fire of 28 April 1912. A reinforced concrete tower was chosen as the most cost effective solution to provide higher pressure water for firefighting. Mayor Arthur William Gillies in 1912 negotiated the purchase of three town sections at the corner of Albion Street and High Street. Owned by the Post and Telegraph Department who did not want to sell the land, Gillies negotiated an exchange where the department received a borough reserve on Waihi Road. Plans for the tower were drawn up by J. C. Cameron, engineer for the Borough of Hawera, who was assisted by structural engineer S. T. Silver. Due to the insistence by insurance companies, the tower's planned height was increased to 54 m (177 ft). Plans for construction of the tower were announced on 2 October 1912, and construction began on 11 December 1912.

In February 1912, it was discovered that the tower had an 80 centimetres (31 in) lean to the south, potentially caused by a recent earthquake felt in Hāwera. Cameron was rumoured to have dug under the tower's lean, and secretly poured a second concrete base late at night. According to Cameron's engineering reports, the lean was fixed by anchoring the lower side of the tower and gradually filling the water tanks, using the weight of the water to address the lean. A week after the lean had been discovered, the lean had been lessened from 80 centimetres (31 in) to 8 centimetres (3.1 in).

Construction on the tower was completed in February 1914, and final testing of the structure was completed on 25 March 1914. At the time of opening, it was the largest reinforced concrete tower in New Zealand, and thought to be the tallest reinforced concrete tower in the world, outside of Britain.

In December 1932 to celebrate the 50th jubilee of the establishment of Hāwera, red neon lights were added to the top of the tower. Used for household water until 1958, the tower was never needed to be used for firefighting. In 1964, the water was drained from the tower's tanks, to improve the earthquake safety of the structure.

In 1988, the tower was closed to visitors after an incident where concrete fell from the structure. The building was registered in the New Zealand Historic Places Trust (now Heritage New Zealand), on 21 September 1989. After maintenance, the structure was reopened in 1991, and began being used as a cellphone transmitter from the early 1990s. Due to the significant restoration work needed for the tower, the South Taranaki District Council voted to demolish the structure in 1995. On 27 March 2000, large chunks of concrete fell from the tower, leading it to be declared unsafe and closed to visitors. After lobbying efforts by town historian Ross Dunlop and several Hāwera-based councillors, the tower was saved from demolition, and renovations work was undertaken. Reports conducted in 1989 and 2000 indicated that the steel structure was corroding, and much of the outer layers of concrete had significant chloride concentrations. The tower was restored using hydrodemolition on the outer concrete layers, replacing concrete, strengthening the structure with carbon fiber and the application of cementious coating and Migrating Corrosion Inhibitor.

== Impact ==
The viewing platform of the Hāwera Water Tower has become a visitor attraction for the town, and the tower is seen as a Taranaki landmark and symbol of the town of Hawera.

== Gallery ==
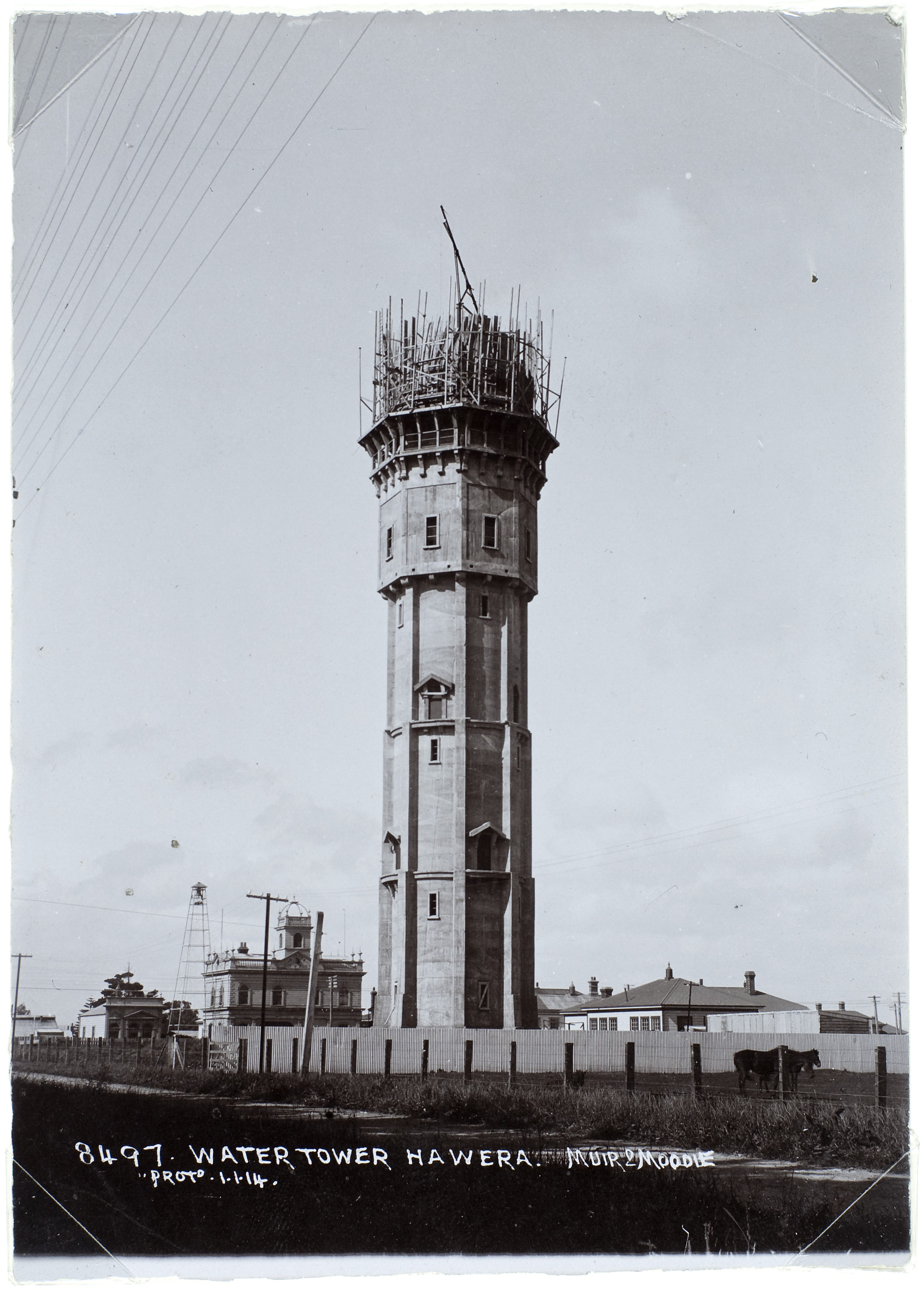
Final stages of construction in January 1914

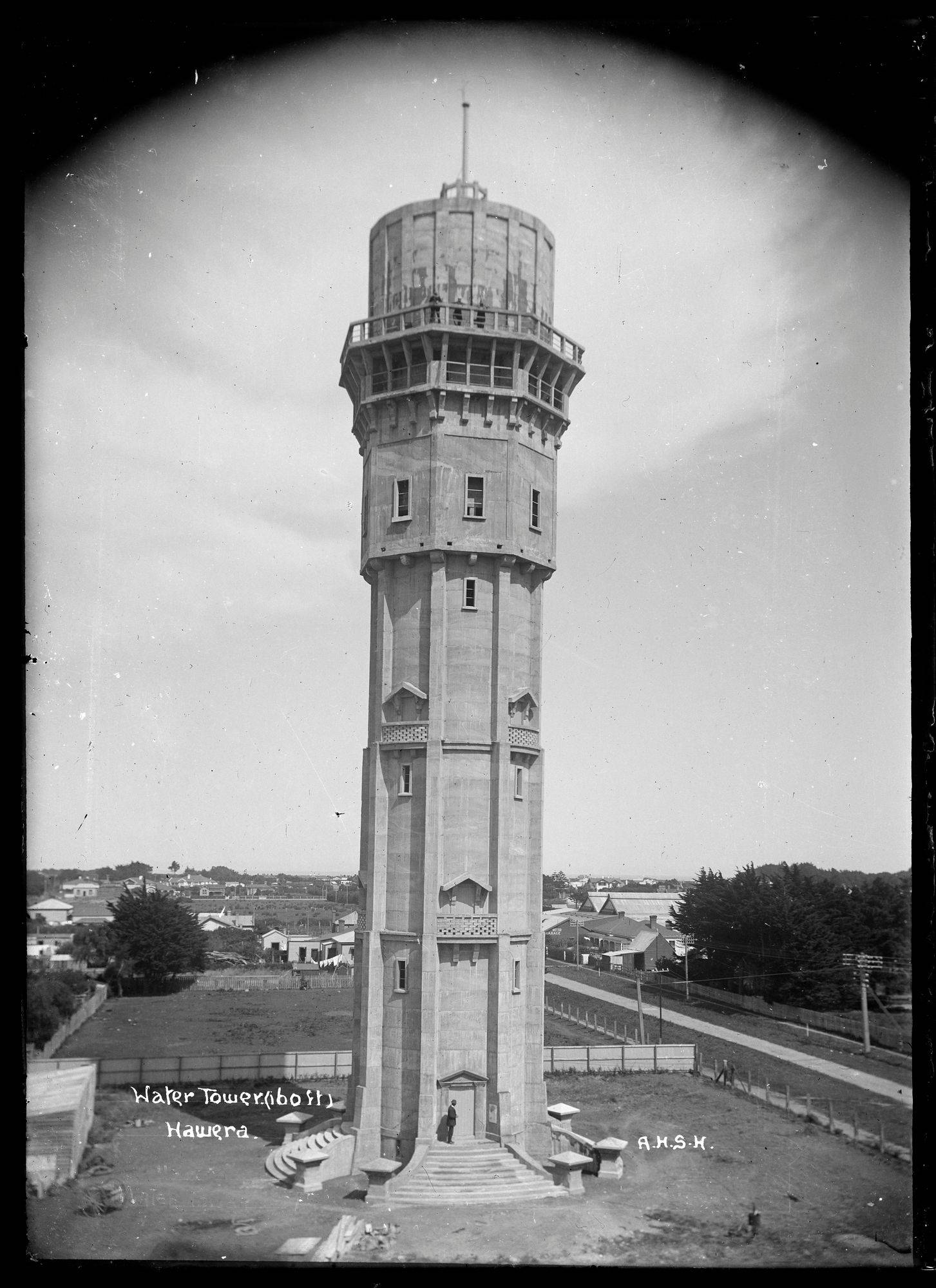
The water tower after construction in 1914

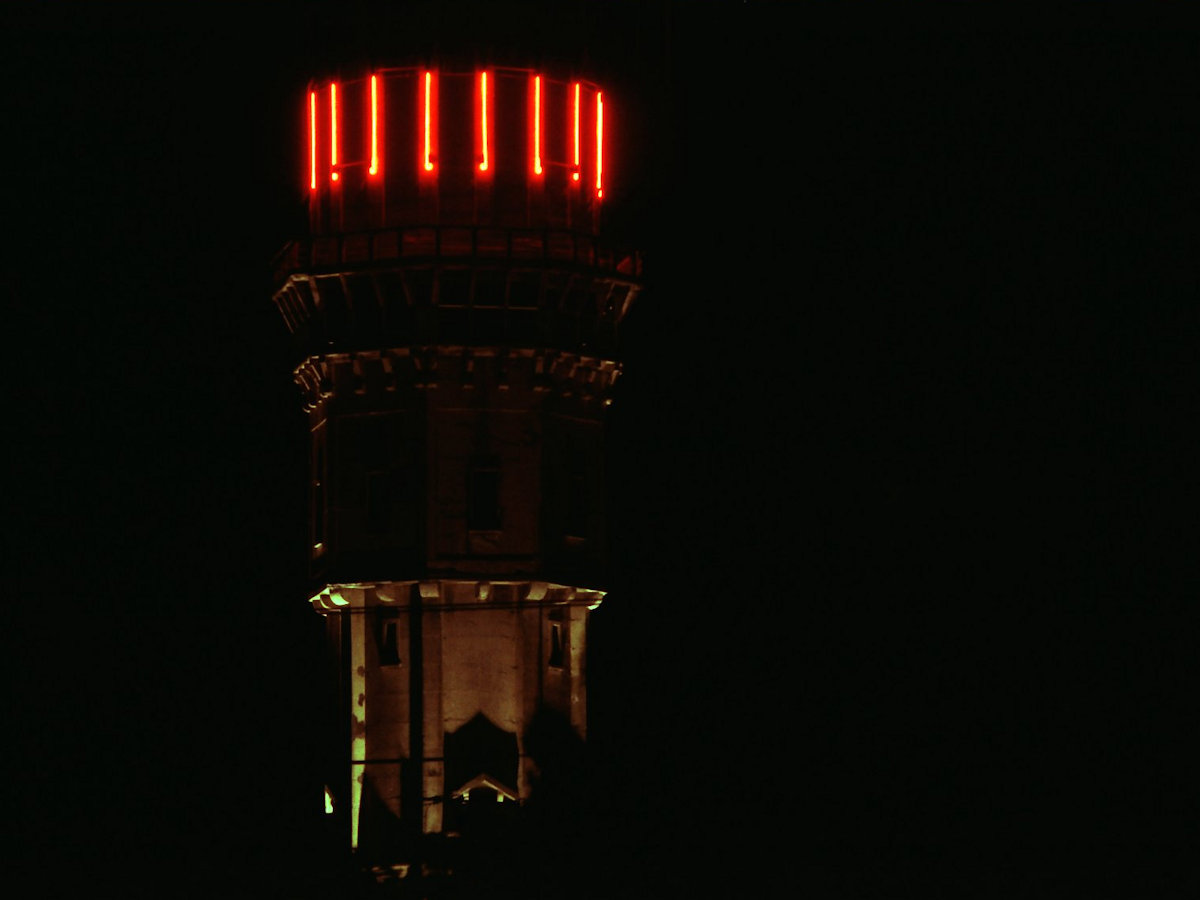
The neon lights of the water tower, photographed in 1988

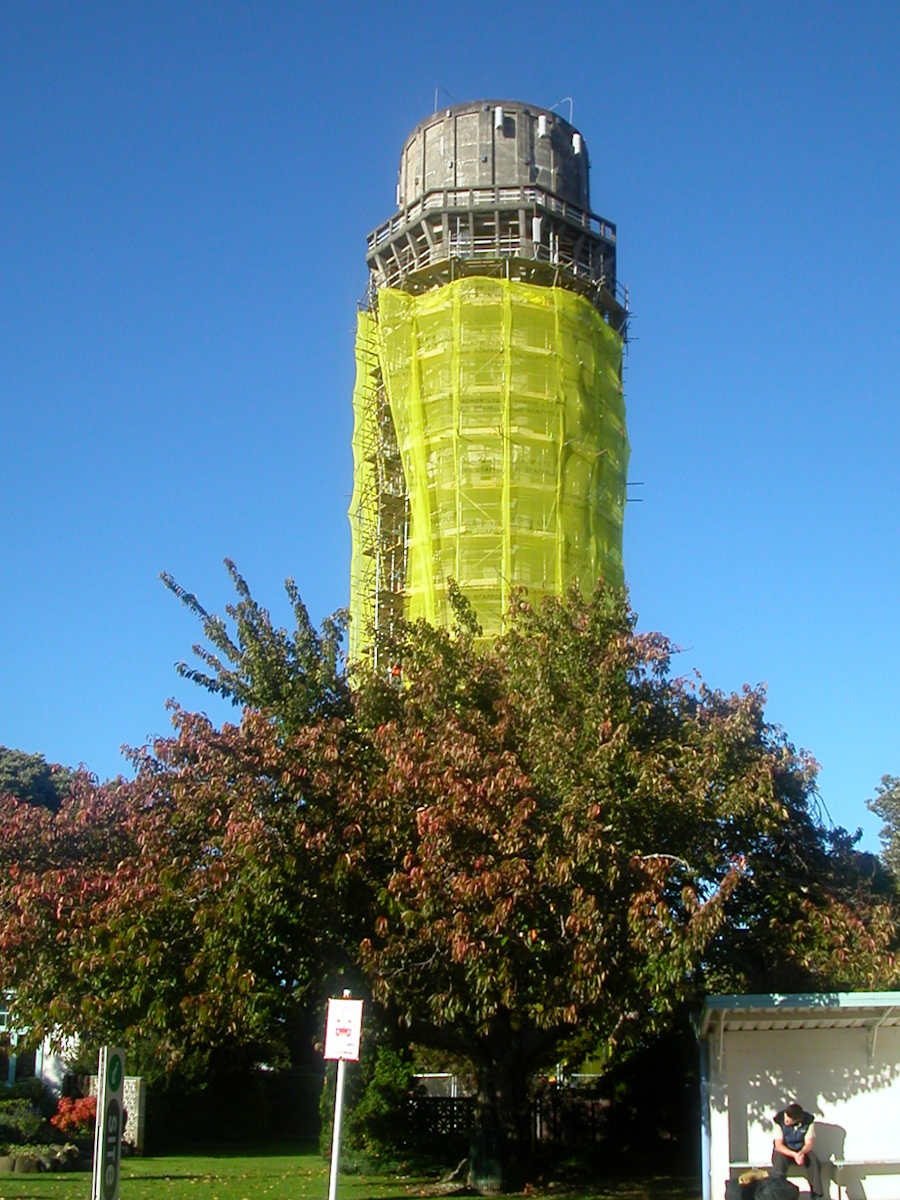
The water tower undergoing renovations in 2004

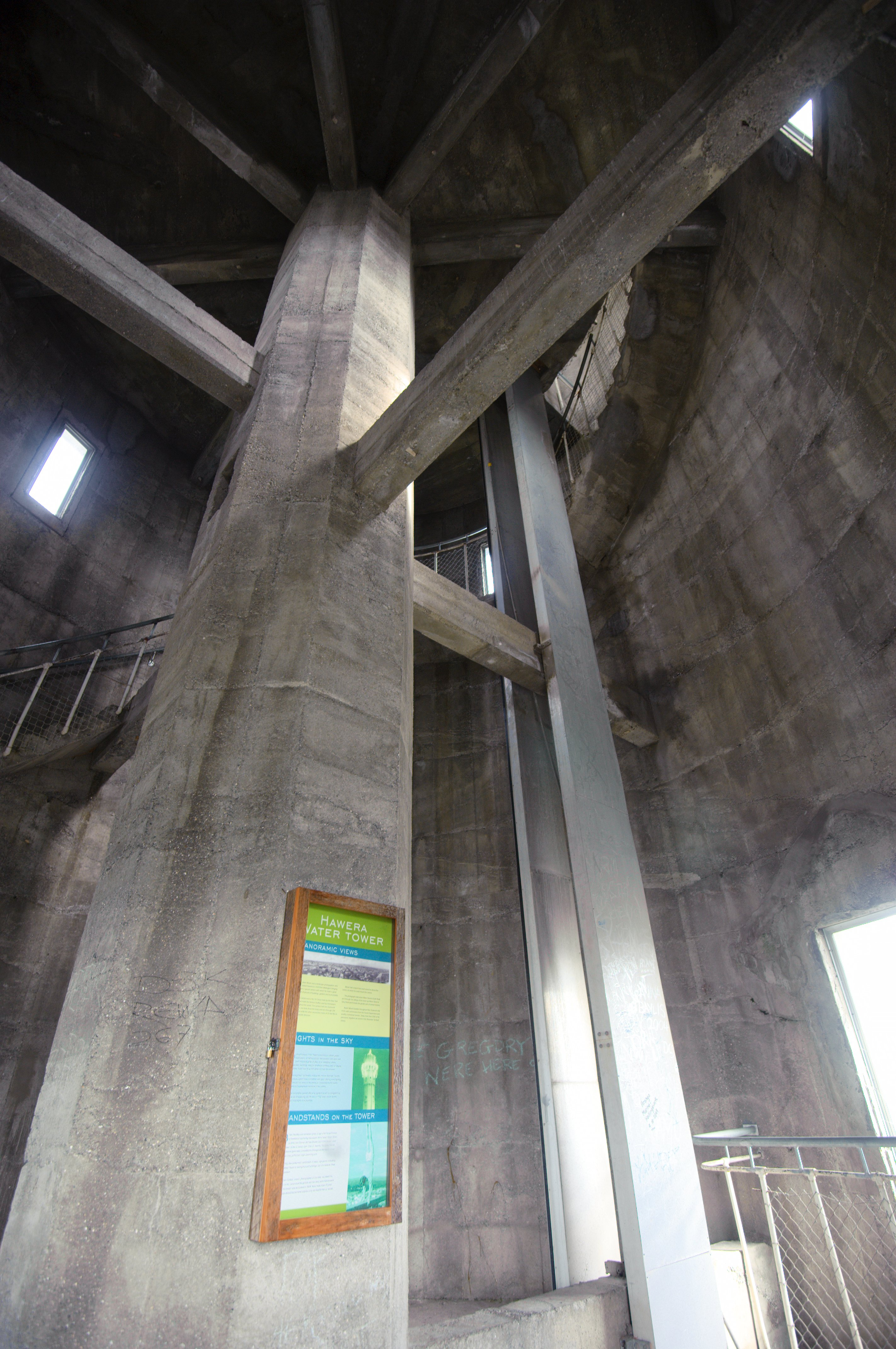
Interior of the water tower

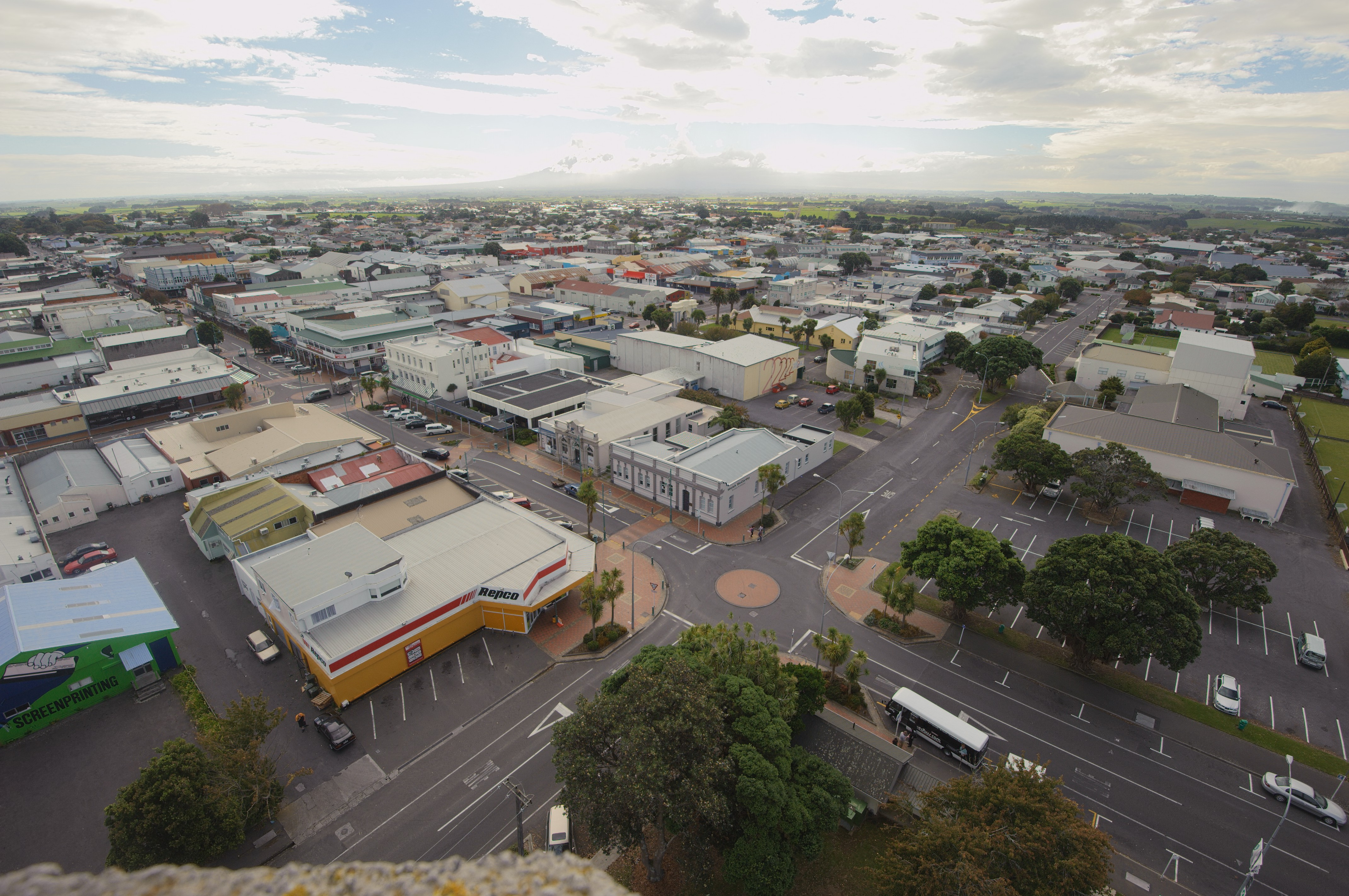
View of Hāwera from the water tower

== Bibliography ==
- Bromley, A. P. C. (1981). Hawera District Centenary. Centennial Committee of the Hawera District Council.
- Fryer, Arthur (1995). Hawera's on Fire. Hawera Historical Society. ISBN 0-473-03339-9.
