= Ohawe =

Rural community in South Taranaki, New Zealand

Ohawe Ōhawe
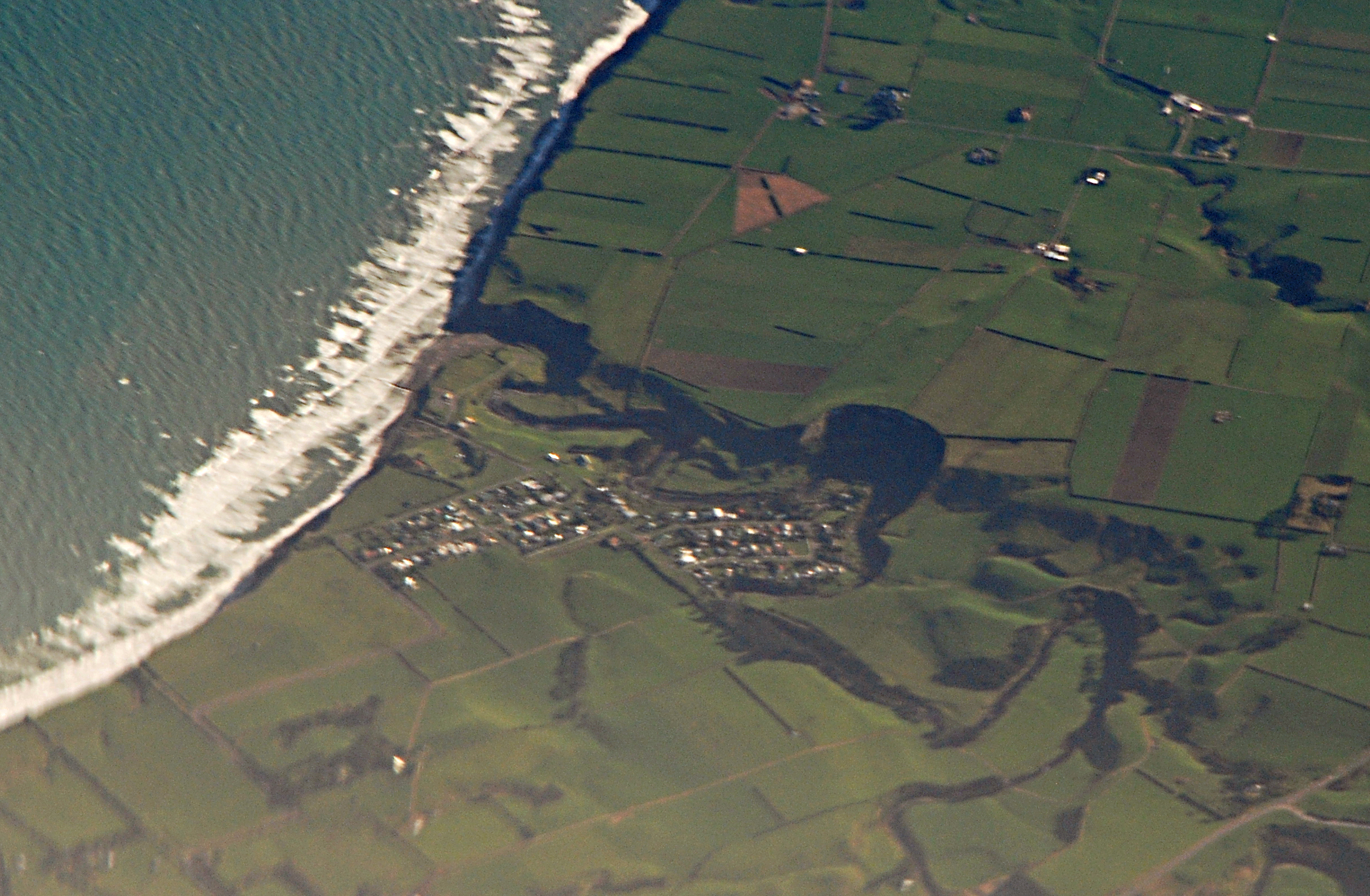
- Ohawe settlement
- Interactive map of Ohawe
- Coordinates: 39.585°S 174.199°E
- Country: New Zealand
- Region: Taranaki
- Territorial authority: South Taranaki District
- Ward: Te Hāwera General Ward; Te Kūrae Māori Ward
- Community: Te Hāwera Community
- Electorates: Whanganui; Te Tai Hauāuru (Māori)

Government
  - Territorial Authority: South Taranaki District Council
  - Regional council: Taranaki Regional Council
  - Mayor of South Taranaki: Phil Nixon
  - Whanganui MP: Carl Bates
  - Te Tai Hauāuru MP: Debbie Ngarewa-Packer

Area
  - Total: 0.90 km^{2} (0.35 sq mi)

Population (June 2025)
  - Total: 240
  - Density: 270/km^{2} (690/sq mi)
- Postcode: 4671

Ohawe or Ōhawe is a rural community in South Taranaki, New Zealand. It is located about 9 kilometres west of Hāwera, and south of State Highway 45. Ohawe is at the mouth of the Waingongoro River, where it reaches the South Taranaki Bight.

The name means "place of a river bend", referring to the winding Waingongoro River.

A coastal walk at low tide goes to Waihi Beach.

== History ==
Māori settled in the area around 1300 CE. They hunted moa and other birds. Richard Taylor described it as "a regular necropolis" in 1843. In 1847, Walter Mantell realised that Māori and moa had lived in the area at the same time.

In 1865, during the Second Taranaki War, General Duncan Cameron built redoubts on both sides of the Waingongoro river mouth. About 45 troops killed during the war are buried at Ohawe Soldiers' Cemetery.

== Demographics ==
Ōhāwe is described by Statistics New Zealand as a rural settlement, which covers 0.90 km^{2} (0.35 sq mi). It had an estimated population of 240 as of June 2025, with a population density of 267 people per km^{2}. It is part of the larger Okaiawa statistical area.

Historical population
Year	Pop.	±% p.a.
2006	213	—
2013	183	−2.15%
2018	216	+3.37%
2023	231	+1.35%

Ōhāwe had a population of 231 in the 2023 New Zealand census, an increase of 15 people (6.9%) since the 2018 census, and an increase of 48 people (26.2%) since the 2013 census. There were 111 males and 120 females in 96 dwellings. 1.3% of people identified as LGBTIQ+. The median age was 44.5 years (compared with 38.1 years nationally). There were 45 people (19.5%) aged under 15 years, 27 (11.7%) aged 15 to 29, 114 (49.4%) aged 30 to 64, and 45 (19.5%) aged 65 or older.

People could identify as more than one ethnicity. The results were 81.8% European (Pākehā); 32.5% Māori; 3.9% Pasifika; 1.3% Asian; 1.3% Middle Eastern, Latin American and African New Zealanders (MELAA); and 2.6% other, which includes people giving their ethnicity as "New Zealander". English was spoken by 98.7%, Māori by 7.8%, Samoan by 1.3%, and other languages by 5.2%. No language could be spoken by 1.3% (e.g. too young to talk). The percentage of people born overseas was 14.3, compared with 28.8% nationally.

Religious affiliations were 35.1% Christian, 1.3% Hindu, 1.3% Buddhist, and 1.3% other religions. People who answered that they had no religion were 50.6%, and 10.4% of people did not answer the census question.

Of those at least 15 years old, 36 (19.4%) people had a bachelor's or higher degree, 114 (61.3%) had a post-high school certificate or diploma, and 45 (24.2%) people exclusively held high school qualifications. The median income was $41,400, compared with $41,500 nationally. 21 people (11.3%) earned over $100,000 compared to 12.1% nationally. The employment status of those at least 15 was 105 (56.5%) full-time, 15 (8.1%) part-time, and 6 (3.2%) unemployed.
