= Auroa =

Settlement in Taranaki Region, New Zealand

- Interactive map of Auroa
- Coordinates: 39°29′1″S 174°2′38″E
- Country: New Zealand
- Region: Taranaki
- Territorial authority: South Taranaki District
- Ward: Taranaki Coastal General Ward; Eltham-Kaponga General Ward; Te Kūrae Māori Ward
- Community: Taranaki Coastal Community; Eltham-Kaponga Community
- Electorates: Whanganui; Te Tai Hauāuru (Māori)

Government
  - Territorial Authority: South Taranaki District Council
  - Regional council: Taranaki Regional Council
  - Mayor of South Taranaki: Phil Nixon
  - Whanganui MP: Carl Bates
  - Te Tai Hauāuru MP: Debbie Ngarewa-Packer

Area
  - Total: 47.13 km^{2} (18.20 sq mi)

Population (2023 Census)
  - Total: 264
  - Density: 5.60/km^{2} (14.5/sq mi)

Auroa is a locality in southern Taranaki, New Zealand. Ōpunake is to the west, Kaponga to the northeast, and Manaia to the southeast. Mount Taranaki is directly north of Auroa.

The New Zealand Ministry for Culture and Heritage gives a translation of "long cloud" for Auroa.

== Demographics ==
Auroa locality covers 41.13 km^{2} (15.88 sq mi). It is part of the larger Taungatara statistical area.

Historical population for Auroa locality
Year	Pop.	±% p.a.
2006	297	—
2013	291	−0.29%
2018	270	−1.49%
2023	264	−0.45%

Auroa had a population of 264 in the 2023 New Zealand census, a decrease of 6 people (−2.2%) since the 2018 census, and a decrease of 27 people (−9.3%) since the 2013 census. There were 132 males and 132 females in 99 dwellings. 3.4% of people identified as LGBTIQ+. There were 63 people (23.9%) aged under 15 years, 51 (19.3%) aged 15 to 29, 123 (46.6%) aged 30 to 64, and 27 (10.2%) aged 65 or older.

People could identify as more than one ethnicity. The results were 93.2% European (Pākehā), 15.9% Māori, 2.3% Pasifika, and 3.4% other, which includes people giving their ethnicity as "New Zealander". English was spoken by 96.6%, Māori by 2.3%, Samoan by 1.1%, and other languages by 3.4%. No language could be spoken by 2.3% (e.g. too young to talk). New Zealand Sign Language was known by 1.1%. The percentage of people born overseas was 8.0, compared with 28.8% nationally.

Religious affiliations were 27.3% Christian. People who answered that they had no religion were 63.6%, and 8.0% of people did not answer the census question.

Of those at least 15 years old, 12 (6.0%) people had a bachelor's or higher degree, 129 (64.2%) had a post-high school certificate or diploma, and 54 (26.9%) people exclusively held high school qualifications. 15 people (7.5%) earned over $100,000 compared to 12.1% nationally. The employment status of those at least 15 was 126 (62.7%) full-time, 21 (10.4%) part-time, and 6 (3.0%) unemployed.

=== Taungatara statistical area ===
Taungatara statistical area, which also includes Otakeho, Te Kiri and Pihama, covers 313.03 km^{2} (120.86 sq mi) and had an estimated population of 1,350 as of June 2025, with a population density of 4.3 people per km^{2}.

Historical population for Taungatara
Year	Pop.	±% p.a.
2006	1,431	—
2013	1,380	−0.52%
2018	1,326	−0.80%
2023	1,311	−0.23%

Taungatara had a population of 1,311 in the 2023 New Zealand census, a decrease of 15 people (−1.1%) since the 2018 census, and a decrease of 69 people (−5.0%) since the 2013 census. There were 672 males, 633 females, and 6 people of other genders in 468 dwellings. 2.5% of people identified as LGBTIQ+. The median age was 34.0 years (compared with 38.1 years nationally). There were 336 people (25.6%) aged under 15 years, 249 (19.0%) aged 15 to 29, 594 (45.3%) aged 30 to 64, and 129 (9.8%) aged 65 or older.

People could identify as more than one ethnicity. The results were 90.2% European (Pākehā); 19.5% Māori; 1.6% Pasifika; 3.2% Asian; 0.5% Middle Eastern, Latin American and African New Zealanders (MELAA); and 2.7% other, which includes people giving their ethnicity as "New Zealander". English was spoken by 97.9%, Māori by 2.5%, Samoan by 0.2%, and other languages by 4.6%. No language could be spoken by 1.8% (e.g. too young to talk). New Zealand Sign Language was known by 0.7%. The percentage of people born overseas was 11.0, compared with 28.8% nationally.

Religious affiliations were 31.6% Christian, 0.7% Hindu, 0.9% Māori religious beliefs, 0.2% Buddhist, 0.2% New Age, and 1.1% other religions. People who answered that they had no religion were 56.3%, and 9.2% of people did not answer the census question.

Of those at least 15 years old, 123 (12.6%) people had a bachelor's or higher degree, 606 (62.2%) had a post-high school certificate or diploma, and 243 (24.9%) people exclusively held high school qualifications. The median income was $45,000, compared with $41,500 nationally. 90 people (9.2%) earned over $100,000 compared to 12.1% nationally. The employment status of those at least 15 was 573 (58.8%) full-time, 156 (16.0%) part-time, and 21 (2.2%) unemployed.

== Otakeho ==
Otakeho is a part of the Taungatara statistical area, to the south of Auroa and west of the Otakeho Stream (rising on Mount Taranaki and reaching the Tasman Sea at Otakeho), on SH45. It has a hall (built in 1897 to celebrate Queen Victoria's Diamond Jubilee), a boarded up store (probably built about 1920) and a few houses. To the west of Otakeho is Ngāruahine's Tawhitinui Marae.

Otakeho has a small sandy beach, beyond Dingle Road, at the foot of 40 m (130 ft) high cliffs. It is used for fishing and has a poorly protected, nationally threatened, variety of Craspedia, Craspedia Otakeho.

It once also had a school (1884-2003 - the buildings remain), a Category 2 listed church (sold in 2018 and moved to Pihama in 2021), an hotel (rebuilt after a 1907 fire and since burnt down again), a post office, a smithy and a dairy factory, which occupied several buildings.

The Ōpunake to New Plymouth bus runs through Otakeho daily in each direction, except at weekends.

== Education ==
Auroa School is a coeducational full primary (years 1-8) school with a roll of 162 students as of July 2026. It opened in 1891 as Ratana School, and was renamed Auroa School in 1898. Schools at Pihama, Riverlea and Te Kiri were closed and merged into Auroa School in 2004.

== Association Football ==
The Auroa Association Football club was formed in May 1907. After the First World War the club re-emerged with two sides. A story of an Auroa player who covered nearly 20 miles on a ladies bicycle in just over an hour to deliver a misplaced bag to the Hawera train station appeared in the local newspaper in 1923. In 1924 Mr. W. Brown from Auroa captained Taranaki against Chinese Universities at Hawera's Showgrounds. In 1926 Auroa won the Taranaki Championship and Julian Cup. In 1927 Mr. Freakley from Auroa captained Taranaki against Canada at New Plymouth's Pukekura Park.
