= Margaret Jane Briggs =

New Zealand show-ring rider (1892–1961)

Margaret Jane Briggs (17 April 1892 – 5 November 1961) was a New Zealand show‑ring rider. She was born in Otakeho, Taranaki, New Zealand on 17 April 1892.
