= State Highway 44 (New Zealand) =

Road in New Zealand

State Highway 44

Route information
- Maintained by NZ Transport Agency Waka Kotahi
- Length: 6 km (3.7 mi)

Major junctions
- East end: SH 3 (Eliot Street) / SH 45 (Courtenay Street) in New Plymouth
- West end: Port Taranaki

Location
- Country: New Zealand

Highway system
- New Zealand state highways; Motorways and expressways; List
← SH 43	→ SH 45

State Highway 44 (SH 44) is a New Zealand state highway. At 5.2 km it is one of the shortest highways on the network. Its entire length is within the New Plymouth city area.

== History ==
SH 44 was created in response to an increase in truck traffic between SH 3 and Port Taranaki and the resulting damage being caused to the preferred route (Breakwater Rd/St Aubyn St/Molesworth St). Initially Transit New Zealand was opposed to taking on the road as part of the highway network (making it responsible for the maintenance rather than the New Plymouth District Council) as for much of the route SH 45 is less than 200m away and runs in parallel. However, as SH 45 is a hillier route, uses the one-way network, and has a greater number of traffic lights insisting heavy vehicles use that route was not feasible and Transit eventually granted network status.

== Route ==
The highway leaves SH 3 at the corners where Leach (westbound one-way) and Courtenay (eastbound one-way) Streets intersect with Eliot Street (north-south) just north-east of the New Plymouth CBD. This is the same place where SH 45 also commences. It continues along Eliot St to Molesworth Street then west along this stretch of road, which in turn becomes St Aubyn Street then Breakwater Road. While it terminates at Port Taranaki both entrances to the port are part of SH 44. The first is via Bayly Road and Ocean View Parade while the other is at the end of Breakwater Road.
