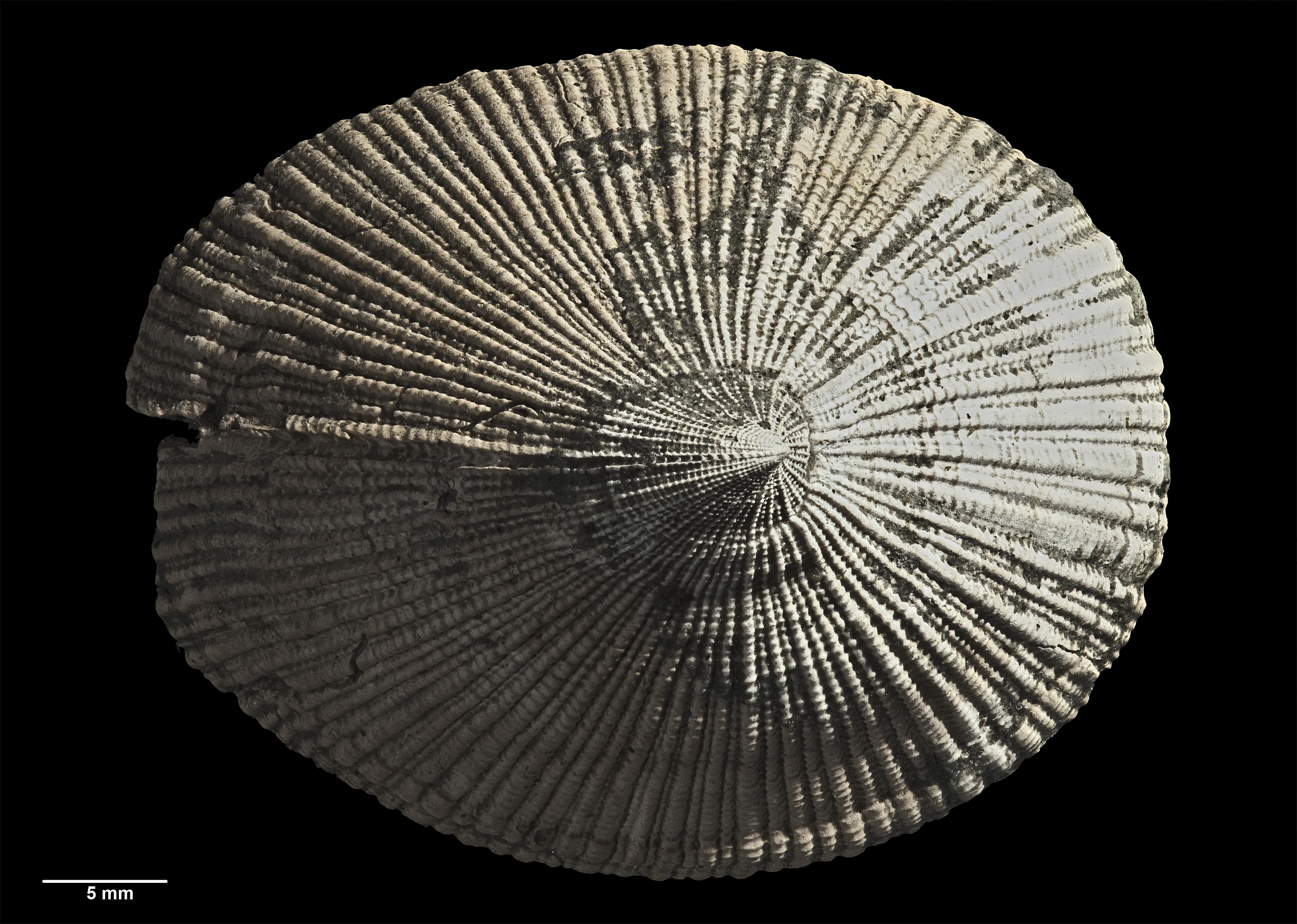
- Holotype from Auckland War Memorial Museum

Scientific classification
- Kingdom: Animalia
- Phylum: Mollusca
- Class: Gastropoda
- Subclass: Vetigastropoda
- Order: Lepetellida
- Family: Fissurellidae
- Genus: Emarginula
- Species: E. haweraensis

Binomial name
- Emarginula haweraensis A. W. B. Powell, 1931

= Emarginula haweraensis =

Emarginula haweraensis Temporal range: 3.70–1.63 Ma

Species of mollusc

Emarginula haweraensis is an extinct species of limpet, a marine mollusc in the family Fissurellidae. Fossils of the species date to between the Waipipian stage (3.70 million years ago) of the late Pliocene, and the Pleistocene Castlecliffian stage (1.63 million years ago) in New Zealand. The largest known species of Emarginula known from New Zealand, fossils of the species are widely distributed around the country.

== Description ==
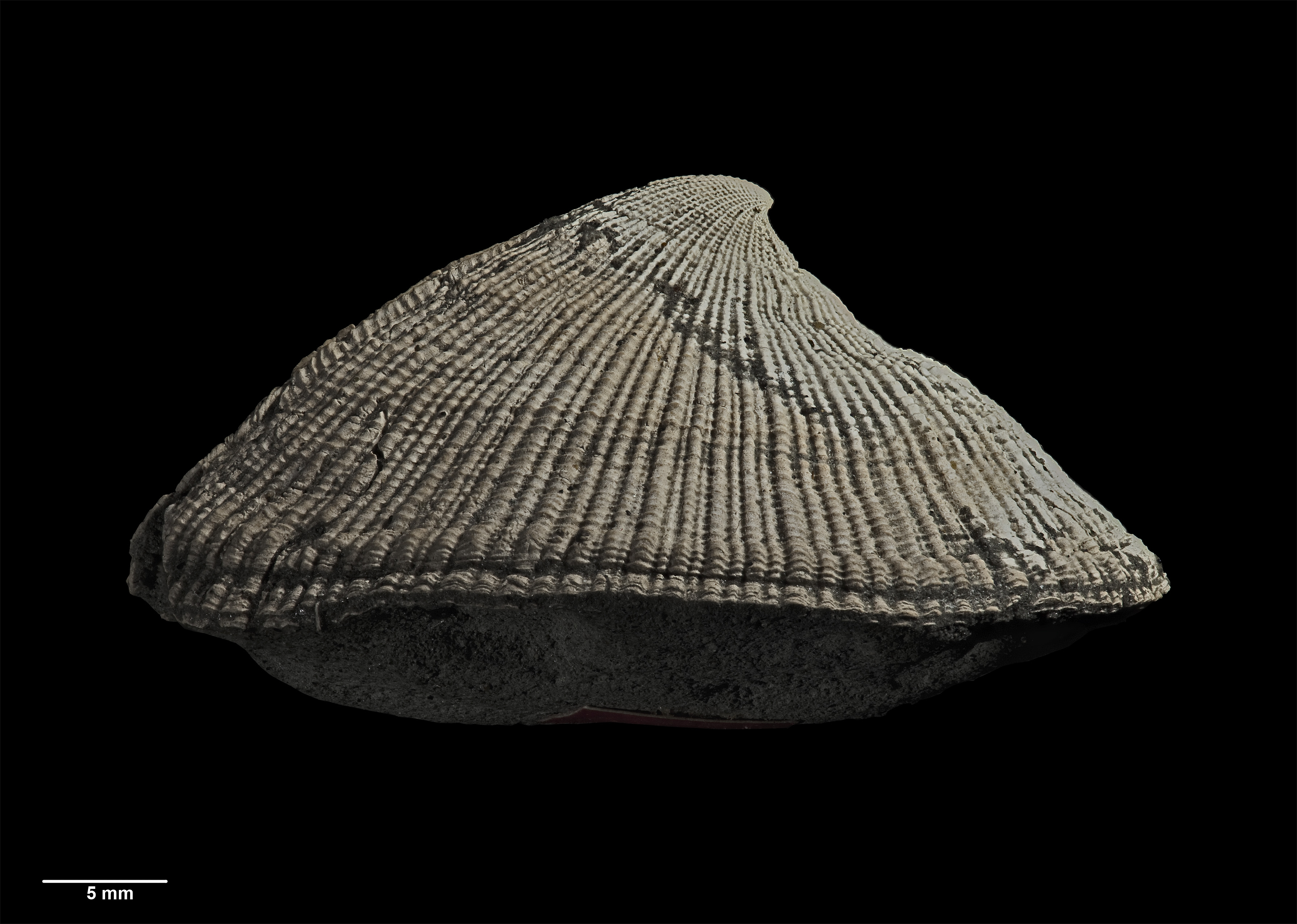
Side view of holotype

In the original description, Powell described the species as follows:

Shell very large, broadly ovate and spreading. Elevation moderate; apex recurved and situated at the posterior three-eighths. Sculpture consisting of moderately strong radials crossed by fine concentric cords. The radials are approximately equal in number to those of striatula, but differ in their development. Both primary and secondary radials are more nearly equal in size and have a tendency to become broader and flatter towards the margin, resulting in only linear interspaces. For this reason it is a difficult matter to sort out primary cords in the adult shell, but a half-grown paratype shows about 44. Furthermore, owing to these linear interspaces the concentric cords merely delicately imbricate the radials; definite reticulation being apparent only in the vicinity of the apex. In the holotype there are about 118 definite radials at the margin (including both primaries and secondaries), of which 86 extend to the apical area.

The holotype of the species has a length of 42.0 mm (1.65 in), a breadth of 33.75 mm (1.329 in), and a height of 17.0 mm (0.67 in). It is the largest known New Zealand species of Emarginula.

== Taxonomy ==
The species was first described by A. W. B. Powell in 1931. The holotype was collected in January 1927 by Powell from near the mouth of Waihi Stream, Hāwera, South Taranaki. It is held in the collections of Auckland War Memorial Museum.

== Distribution ==
This extinct marine species occurs between the late Pliocene Waipipian stage and Pleistocene Castlecliffian stage (3.70-1.63 million years ago) in New Zealand, including the Tangahoe Formation and Lower Kai Iwi Siltstone. Fossils are known to occur in the coast of South Taranaki and northwestern Whanganui District, including near Hāwera, Waverley and Kai Iwi, west of Kapiti Island, and the Cook Strait. Further fossils have been found in offshore marine locations including North Cape, the Bay of Plenty, Ranfurly Bank off the coast of East Cape, Mernoo Bank on the Chatham Rise and Doubtful Sound / Patea in Fiordland. Fossils have been found in marine strata in currently inland locations, including near the Manawatū–Whanganui town Pahiatua and the Maungarake range in Carterton District near Gladstone.
