= Hāwera Observatory =

New Zealand observatory

- Alternative names: Hawera Observatory
- Organization: Hāwera Astronomical Society
- Location: King Edward Park, Hāwera, South Taranaki District, New Zealand
- Coordinates: 39.58589°S 174.27279°E
- Established: 1954
- Website: https://thecommunity.co.nz/clubs/hawera-astronomical-society/

Hāwera Observatory is situated in King Edward Park, Hāwera, New Zealand, and is administered and maintained by the Hāwera Astronomical Society, which meets at the observatory on the second Wednesday of every month. The observatory is also opened by request of the public through its Facebook page, as well as during open nights. The Hāwera Astronomical Society also hosts a youth club that meets fortnightly.

== History ==
The Hāwera Astronomical Society was founded by amateur astronomer and telescope maker George Mortimer Townsend on 29 September 1926, with meetings initially being held in the observatory at his family property at 15 Argyle Street, Hāwera. The society owned a telescope made by astronomer Joseph Ward.

The current observatory building is a converted band rotunda built in 1912 to mark the coronation of King George V in 1911. It was an unusual rotunda, being two storeyed with a tea room below and open band rotunda above. In 1953, the rotunda was converted to an observatory. Equipment, time and materials were donated by local businesses. The dome was made of 22-gauge galvanised metal sheeting and constructed off-site. It was loaded on to a truck and taken to the park, where a team of 15 volunteers lifted the dome over the park gates and into position on top of the rotunda. Local resident N R Burrell donated a Cooke refractor telescope made in 1905. The observatory was handed over to the Hawera Borough Council and officially opened on 19 August 1953.

Apart from the Cooke refractor, the observatory has other telescopes: a 280mm Celestron Schmidt-Cassegrain GOTO, a 200mm Celestron reflector and a 580mm Dobsonian telescope.
