= Kaupokonui =

Coordinates: 39°32′41″S 174°04′20″E

Kaupokonui is a locality in south Taranaki, New Zealand.

== History ==
In the 1880s the New Zealand government encouraged settlement in the Taranaki area by offering land confiscated after the Taranaki Wars to settlers for low prices.

Kaupokonui Cooperative Dairy Company buildings after 1910

In 1897 the Kaupokonui Cooperative Dairy Company was established. The site was chosen due to road access (State Highway 45 now runs through Kaupokonui), the availability of water from the Kaupokonui River, and being in a somewhat central location for the dairy farms in the area. The factory was constructed in 1898 and was a timber structure. The factory brought growth to the area; in 1896 there was little settlement but by 1906 there were 36 land owners in the area, mostly farmers although some factory workers, a bootmaker, and a postmaster were recorded. In 1900 hydropower was being generated from the river via a weir and a series of tunnels and channels. By 1910 the factory had been expanded and a general store was recorded in Kaupokonui.

The Kaupokonui Cooperative Dairy Company had expanded over the years with branches in Oeo and Kapuni and by 1910 it was responsible for an eighth of cheese exports. On 23 December 1910 a fire ripped through the factory destroying most of the factory and the general store, the accommodation block survived. The factory was rebuilt using reinforced concrete. A flood destroyed the weir in 1941 and a new one was constructed. The Kaopokonui Cooperative Dairy Company amalgamated with another company in 1962 to become Kiwi Cooperative Dairies. This company later became Fonterra in 2001. The factory was still in use by the company until 1975 when it was sold to the Pacific Natural Gut String Company, who manufactured tennis rackets at the factory until 2013.
