= Hawera and Normanby Star =

New Zealand newspaper

The Hawera and Normanby Star is a newspaper published in Taranaki, New Zealand.

== History ==
The newspaper was first published on 10 April 1880. It ceased publication as a commercial newspaper in 1977, after which it has continued as a community newspaper.
