= Kaponga =

Settlement in Taranaki Region, New Zealand

- The Kaponga Logo
- Interactive map of Kaponga
- Coordinates: 39°25′S 174°08′E
- Country: New Zealand
- Region: Taranaki Region
- Territorial authority: South Taranaki District
- Ward: Eltham-Kaponga General Ward; Te Kūrae Māori Ward
- Community: Eltham-Kaponga Community
- Electorates: Whanganui; Te Tai Hauāuru (Māori)

Government
  - Territorial Authority: South Taranaki District Council
  - Regional council: Taranaki Regional Council
  - Mayor of South Taranaki: Phil Nixon
  - Whanganui MP: Carl Bates
  - Te Tai Hauāuru MP: Debbie Ngarewa-Packer

Area
  - Total: 1.56 km^{2} (0.60 sq mi)

Population (June 2025)
  - Total: 360
  - Density: 230/km^{2} (600/sq mi)

Kaponga is a small town in the southern part of the Taranaki region of New Zealand. It is known as "The Gateway to Dawson's Falls" on Mount Taranaki. Kaponga is located inland from Manaia and Eltham, and is on the main road connecting Eltham to Ōpunake. Ōpunake is 26 kilometres (16 mi) to the west and Eltham is 13 km to the east. Auroa lies to the south-east. Manaia is 15 kilometres (9 mi) south of Kaponga.

== History ==
The small town of Kaponga was settled in 1882, and has strong Swiss connections. Some of the first settlers in the area were Swiss, and in 1952, the Taranaki Swiss Club was formed.

The town was once much larger than it is today: with many stores. There are only a few shops now. It is also home to a garden of national significance, Hollard Gardens.

There are many other businesses working in and around the village, mainly relying on the booming dairy industry. The Kaponga and surrounding community has a South Taranaki District Council LibraryPlus, which provides a full library service and Council related services. These services include being able to register your dog, pay your rates or inquire about obtaining a building permit. The LibraryPlus also has two APN computers, offering free internet and Skype to the public.

== Demographics ==
Kaponga is described by Statistics New Zealand as a rural settlement. It covers 1.56 km^{2} (0.60 sq mi) and had an estimated population of 360 as of June 2025, with a population density of 231 people per km^{2}. It is part of the larger Kaponga-Mangatoki statistical area.

Historical population for Kaponga
Year	Pop.	±% p.a.
2006	363	—
2013	294	−2.97%
2018	312	+1.20%
2023	357	+2.73%

Mount Taranaki taken from a residential home in Kaponga

Kaponga had a population of 357 in the 2023 New Zealand census, an increase of 45 people (14.4%) since the 2018 census, and an increase of 63 people (21.4%) since the 2013 census. There were 189 males and 168 females in 147 dwellings. 4.2% of people identified as LGBTIQ+. The median age was 41.6 years (compared with 38.1 years nationally). There were 69 people (19.3%) aged under 15 years, 66 (18.5%) aged 15 to 29, 171 (47.9%) aged 30 to 64, and 51 (14.3%) aged 65 or older.

People could identify as more than one ethnicity. The results were 80.7% European (Pākehā), 33.6% Māori, 5.0% Pasifika, 1.7% Asian, and 3.4% other, which includes people giving their ethnicity as "New Zealander". English was spoken by 98.3%, Māori by 9.2%, and other languages by 2.5%. No language could be spoken by 2.5% (e.g. too young to talk). New Zealand Sign Language was known by 1.7%. The percentage of people born overseas was 8.4, compared with 28.8% nationally.

Religious affiliations were 19.3% Christian, 2.5% Māori religious beliefs, and 0.8% New Age. People who answered that they had no religion were 66.4%, and 12.6% of people did not answer the census question.

Of those at least 15 years old, 15 (5.2%) people had a bachelor's or higher degree, 171 (59.4%) had a post-high school certificate or diploma, and 102 (35.4%) people exclusively held high school qualifications. The median income was $31,200, compared with $41,500 nationally. 15 people (5.2%) earned over $100,000 compared to 12.1% nationally. The employment status of those at least 15 was 123 (42.7%) full-time, 33 (11.5%) part-time, and 18 (6.2%) unemployed.

=== Kaponga-Mangatoki statistical area ===
Kaponga-Mangatoki statistical area covers 172.81 km^{2} (66.72 sq mi) and had an estimated population of 1,360 as of June 2025, with a population density of 7.9 people per km^{2}.

Historical population for Kaponga-Mangatoki
Year	Pop.	±% p.a.
2006	1,371	—
2013	1,281	−0.97%
2018	1,305	+0.37%
2023	1,326	+0.32%

Kaponga-Mangatoki had a population of 1,326 in the 2023 New Zealand census, an increase of 21 people (1.6%) since the 2018 census, and an increase of 45 people (3.5%) since the 2013 census. There were 696 males, 627 females, and 3 people of other genders in 486 dwellings. 2.3% of people identified as LGBTIQ+. The median age was 36.8 years (compared with 38.1 years nationally). There were 321 people (24.2%) aged under 15 years, 213 (16.1%) aged 15 to 29, 645 (48.6%) aged 30 to 64, and 153 (11.5%) aged 65 or older.

People could identify as more than one ethnicity. The results were 89.1% European (Pākehā); 17.6% Māori; 1.6% Pasifika; 3.4% Asian; 0.2% Middle Eastern, Latin American and African New Zealanders (MELAA); and 1.8% other, which includes people giving their ethnicity as "New Zealander". English was spoken by 98.2%, Māori by 3.4%, and other languages by 4.3%. No language could be spoken by 2.0% (e.g. too young to talk). New Zealand Sign Language was known by 0.5%. The percentage of people born overseas was 8.8, compared with 28.8% nationally.

Religious affiliations were 28.1% Christian, 1.6% Māori religious beliefs, 0.2% New Age, and 0.5% other religions. People who answered that they had no religion were 60.2%, and 9.7% of people did not answer the census question.

Of those at least 15 years old, 84 (8.4%) people had a bachelor's or higher degree, 594 (59.1%) had a post-high school certificate or diploma, and 327 (32.5%) people exclusively held high school qualifications. The median income was $41,800, compared with $41,500 nationally. 111 people (11.0%) earned over $100,000 compared to 12.1% nationally. The employment status of those at least 15 was 552 (54.9%) full-time, 141 (14.0%) part-time, and 36 (3.6%) unemployed.

== Education ==
Kaponga School is a school with a roll of 47 students. The school was founded in 1891. In 2005, Kapuni and Mahoe schools closed and merged into Kaponga School.

St Patrick's School is a state integrated Catholic school with a roll of 28 students. St Patrick's started in 1921 with lessons held in the local church. It moved into its own building in February 1922.

Both are coeducational full primary schools, covering years 1-8. Rolls are as of July 2026.

== Association Football ==
The Kaponga Soccer Club was formed in 1906 and is one of the oldest football clubs in Taranaki. The club has won the Taranaki Championship three times, in 1909 1912 and 1924. In 1926 the club won the Manaia Hibernian Society 7-a-side cup before disbanding for a time. A new club emerged in the area under the name Egmont United in 1929, made from Kaponga, Auroa, Eltham and Stratford players before dissolving in 1931.
