= Hawe =

Hawe is a surname. Notable people with the surname include:

- Dick Hawe (1883–1961), English footballer
- Sarah Hawe (born 1987), Australian rower
- Steven Hawe (born 1980), Northern Irish footballer

== See also ==
- Hawes (surname)
