= Waingongoro River =

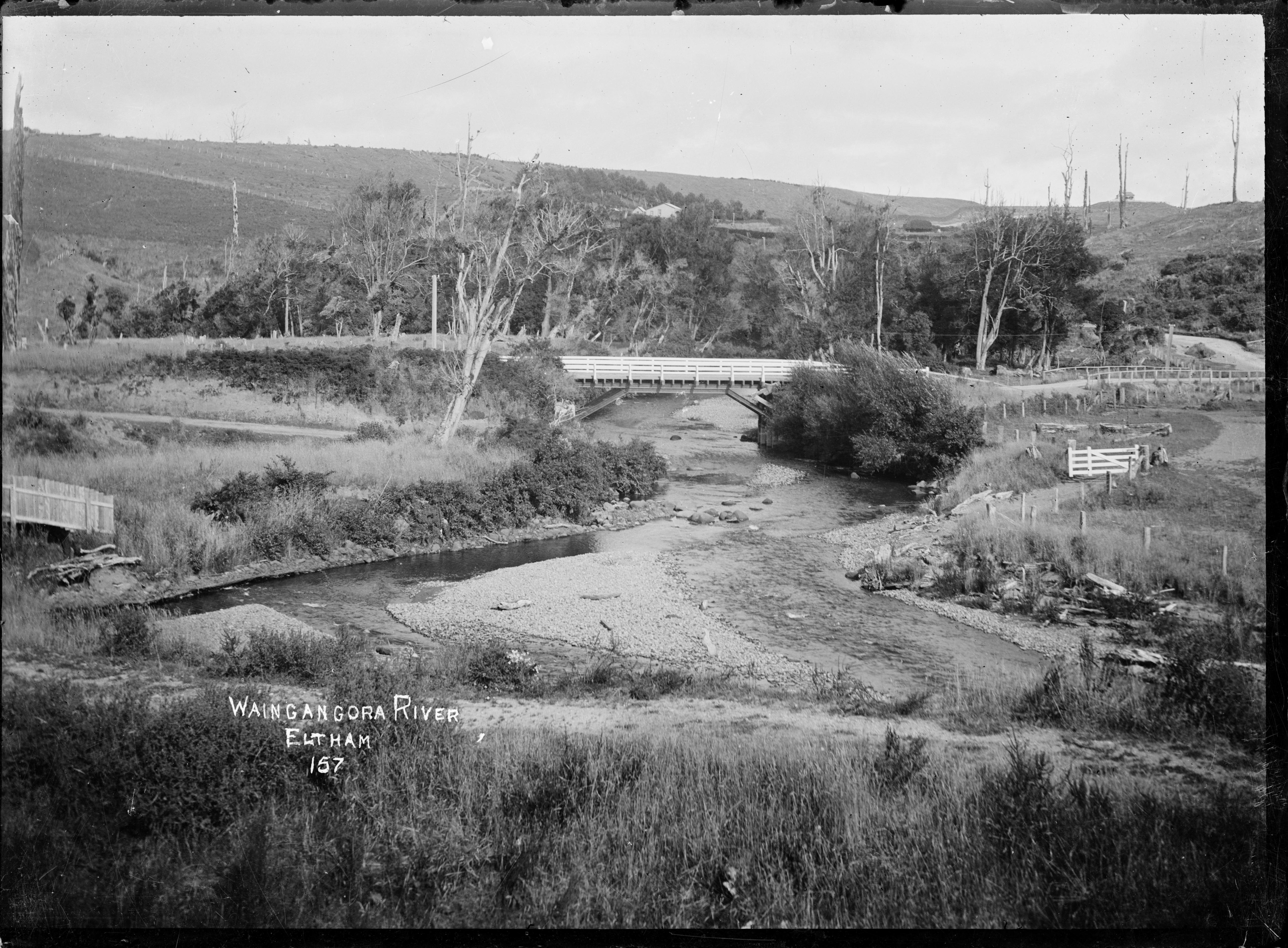
- Waingongoro River near Eltham (circa 1910s).
- Route of the Waingongoro River
- Mouth of the Waingongoro River Waingongoro River (North Island)

Location
- Country: New Zealand

Physical characteristics
- Source
  - location: Mount Taranaki
  - coordinates: 39°18′24″S 174°05′13″E
- Mouth
  - location: South Taranaki Bight
  - coordinates: 39°35′10″S 174°11′32″E
  - elevation: 0 m (0 ft)
- Length: 44 km (27 mi)

Basin features
- Progression: Waingongoro River → South Taranaki Bight → Tasman Sea
- Tributaries
  - left: Tuikonga Stream
  - right: Mangatoki Stream

The Waingongoro River is a river of the Taranaki Region of New Zealand's North Island. It flows initially southeast from the slopes of Taranaki/Mount Egmont and passes through the town of Eltham before veering southwest to meet the Tasman Sea five kilometres west of Hāwera, at Ohawe Beach.

The Normanby Power Station is located on the Waingongoro River at Normanby Road.

== See also ==
- List of rivers of New Zealand
