= State Highway 45 (New Zealand) =

Road in New Zealand

State Highway 45

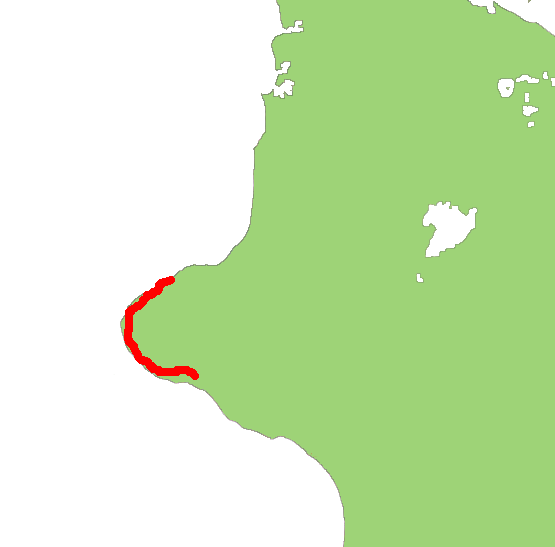

Route information
- Maintained by NZ Transport Agency Waka Kotahi
- Length: 105 km (65 mi)
- Tourist routes: Surf Highway

Major junctions
- North end: SH 3 (Leach Street/Courtenay Street) / SH 44 (Eliot Street) in New Plymouth
- South end: SH 3 (Waihi Road) at Hāwera

Location
- Country: New Zealand
- Primary destinations: Ōakura, Ōkato, Rahotu, Ōpunake, Manaia

Highway system
- New Zealand state highways; Motorways and expressways; List
← SH 44	→ SH 46

State Highway 45 (SH 45) is a New Zealand state highway which has the moniker of the Surf Highway due to the number of prominent surfing breaks that are accessible from it.

It is two-line single carriageway for most of its length, with at-grade intersections and property access' in both urban and rural areas.

== Route ==
SH 45 leaves SH 3 at the corner of Leach and Eliot streets north-east of the New Plymouth CBD. It then continues west along the New Plymouth one-way network (westbound Leach and Vivian streets, eastbound Powderham and Courtenay streets) then onto Devon St West and South Road exiting New Plymouth via the south-western suburbs. It then heads south-west along the Taranaki coastal plain passing through Ōakura and Ōkato. At Cape Egmont it turns south-east following the coast passing the Oaonui production station and through Ōpunake and Manaia before terminating at the crossroad intersection of Waihi, Denby and South Roads in Hāwera, where it again meets SH 3.
