= Douglas, Taranaki =

Settlement in Taranaki Region, New Zealand

Douglas
- Interactive map of Douglas
- Coordinates: 39°18′S 174°28′E
- Country: New Zealand
- Region: Taranaki
- Territorial authority: Stratford District
- Ward: Stratford Rural General Ward; Stratford Māori Ward
- Electorates: Taranaki-King Country; Te Tai Hauāuru (Māori)

Government
  - Territorial Authority: Stratford District Council
  - Regional council: Taranaki Regional Council
  - Mayor of Stratford: Neil Volzke
  - Taranaki-King Country MP: Barbara Kuriger
  - Te Tai Hauāuru MP: Debbie Ngarewa-Packer

Douglas is a lowly populated locality and a rural centre in east Taranaki, surrounded by dairy, sheep and beef pastoral farming. It is situated 18 km east of Stratford at the intersection of East Road, Ohura Road, Douglas Road South and Bredow Road. East Road and Ohura Road meet to form State Highway 43, linking Stratford to the King Country town of Taumarunui. The Stratford–Okahukura Line, a secondary railway line, runs through Douglas where it veers north-east and away from the state highway for approximately 20 km.

== Geography ==
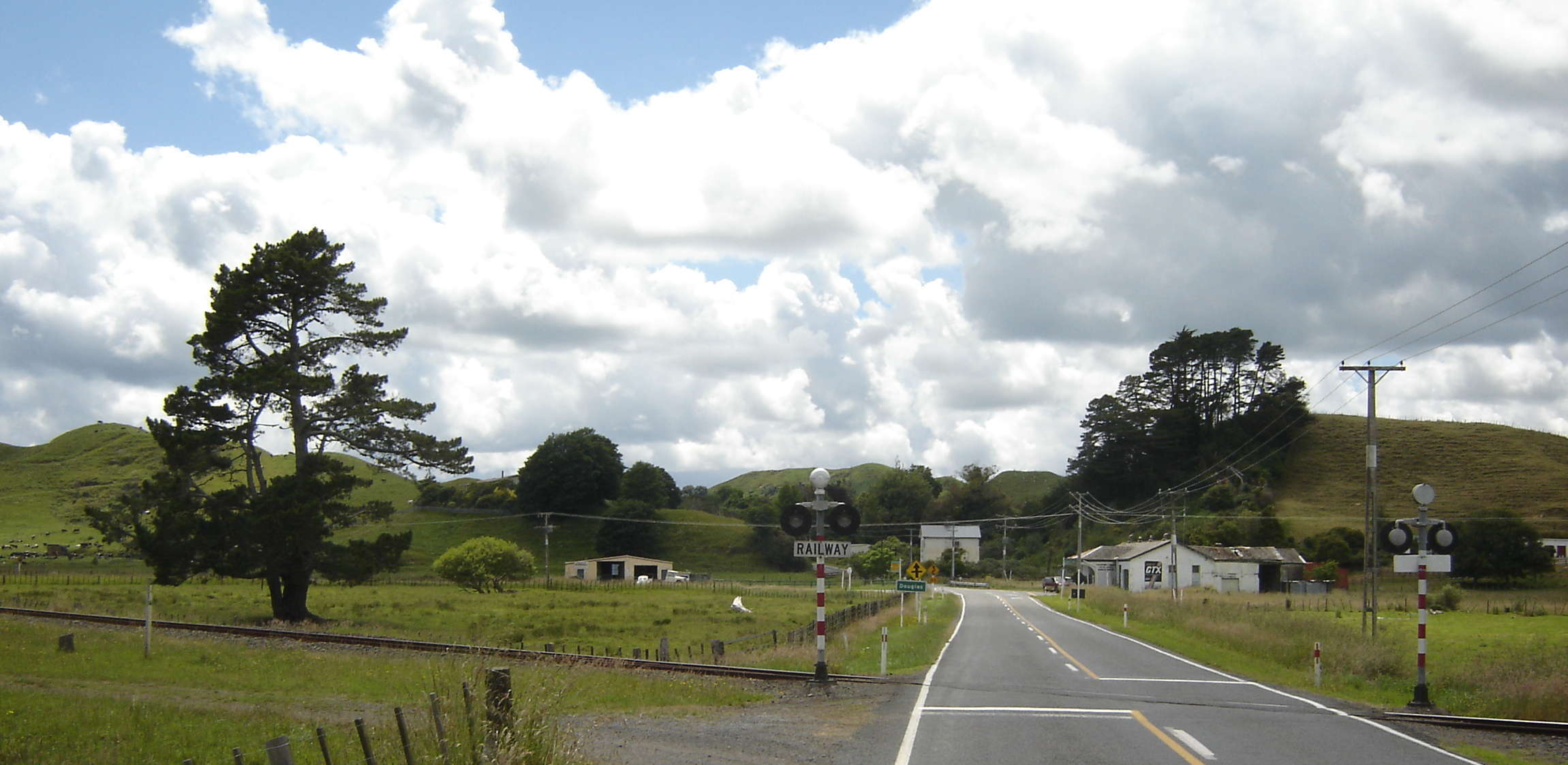
The entrance to Douglas from the west with the Stratford–Okahukura Line railway crossing State Highway 43 in the foreground (December 2007).

Douglas is centred on the Toko Stream adjacent to a small saddle crossed by Ohura Road to the east. The wider locality takes in State Highway 43 from Gordon Road in the west to Mangaotuku Road in the east.

The reclaimed swamplands of the upper Toko valley are the dominant geographic feature, running from the north to the south-west of Douglas, at approximately 200m above sea level. Sandstone/greywacke ridges rise to between 300–370m altitude on each side of the valley floor. Peaks include Tarerepo trig to the north-east (366m altitude), Oruru trig to the south-east (329m) and Makuri trig to the south (327m). Crown Road provides access to farms below the Makuri trig, Bredow Road to farms below the Oruru trig, and Douglas Road to farms in the upper end of the valley (Tarerepo trig). Douglas Road links Douglas to Huiroa, Te Popo, Kiore and Matau.

East of Douglas State Highway 43 (Ohura Road) crosses the Douglas Saddle into the Makuri Valley, which runs parallel to the Toko at approximately 175m above sea level. This is also predominantly reclaimed swamp, while adjoining ridges rise with considerable precipitousness. Walter Road gives access to Makuri valley farms to the north of the main road.

== History ==
Douglas is said to have been named for a member of the Crown's surveying party. It is called Oruru by Māori after the native owl ruru (or morepork). The current town was established at the turn of the 20th century and its hinterland cleared for pastoral farming. A hall was established in 1905 and a primary school in 1906. Through the first half of the century Douglas was a lively village with a productive brick kiln, a milk factory, a railway station, a store, a number of other businesses, and a church. In the 1930s the Douglas saleyards had the greatest turnover of all Taranaki saleyards, particularly in Jersey cattle for cream and cheese production. The Douglas Boarding House, which still stands today, served as an important stopping point for eastbound travellers making the long journey through difficult terrain to Whangamōmona or Taumarunui.

Like other rural settlements, Douglas went into decline from the mid-20th century. Its primary school, which opened in 1906, closed at the end of 2005, and pupils were transferred to nearby Toko School. The community hall and tennis courts remain in the possession of the community.

== Douglas statistical area ==
Douglas statistical area, which takes in those localities within the Pātea and Waitara river catchments to the east of Toko, also including Strathmore, Huiakama, Te Wera, Pohokura, Huiroa, Kiore, Matau, Tututawa, Puniwhakau and Makahu, covers 1,010.46 km^{2} (390.14 sq mi). It had an estimated population of 690 as of June 2025, with a population density of 0.68 people per km^{2}.

Historical population
Year	Pop.	±% p.a.
2006	693	—
2013	645	−1.02%
2018	672	+0.82%
2023	663	−0.27%

Douglas statistical area had a population of 663 in the 2023 New Zealand census, a decrease of 9 people (−1.3%) since the 2018 census, and an increase of 18 people (2.8%) since the 2013 census. There were 363 males and 300 females in 237 dwellings. 0.9% of people identified as LGBTIQ+. The median age was 35.9 years (compared with 38.1 years nationally). There were 183 people (27.6%) aged under 15 years, 96 (14.5%) aged 15 to 29, 306 (46.2%) aged 30 to 64, and 78 (11.8%) aged 65 or older.

People could identify as more than one ethnicity. The results were 92.3% European (Pākehā), 14.9% Māori, 0.9% Pasifika, 1.8% Asian, and 3.6% other, which includes people giving their ethnicity as "New Zealander". English was spoken by 96.8%, Māori by 1.4%, and other languages by 3.2%. No language could be spoken by 2.7% (e.g. too young to talk). New Zealand Sign Language was known by 0.5%. The percentage of people born overseas was 9.0, compared with 28.8% nationally.

Religious affiliations were 23.1% Christian, 0.5% Māori religious beliefs, 0.5% New Age, and 0.9% other religions. People who answered that they had no religion were 64.3%, and 10.9% of people did not answer the census question.

Of those at least 15 years old, 63 (13.1%) people had a bachelor's or higher degree, 288 (60.0%) had a post-high school certificate or diploma, and 129 (26.9%) people exclusively held high school qualifications. The median income was $37,200, compared with $41,500 nationally. 36 people (7.5%) earned over $100,000 compared to 12.1% nationally. The employment status of those at least 15 was 279 (58.1%) full-time, 90 (18.8%) part-time, and 6 (1.2%) unemployed.

== Gallery ==
Buildings in Douglas

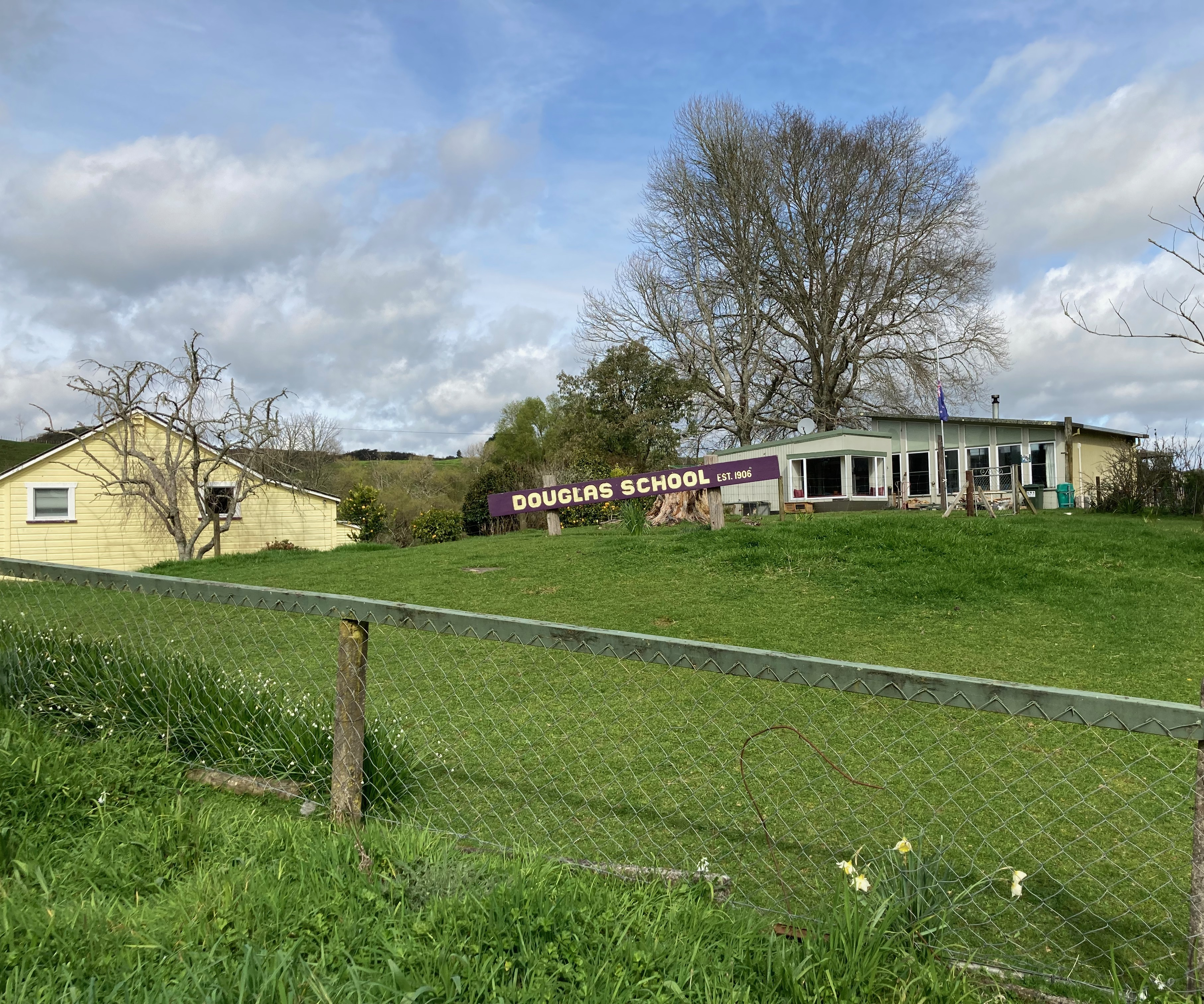
Douglas School, 2022

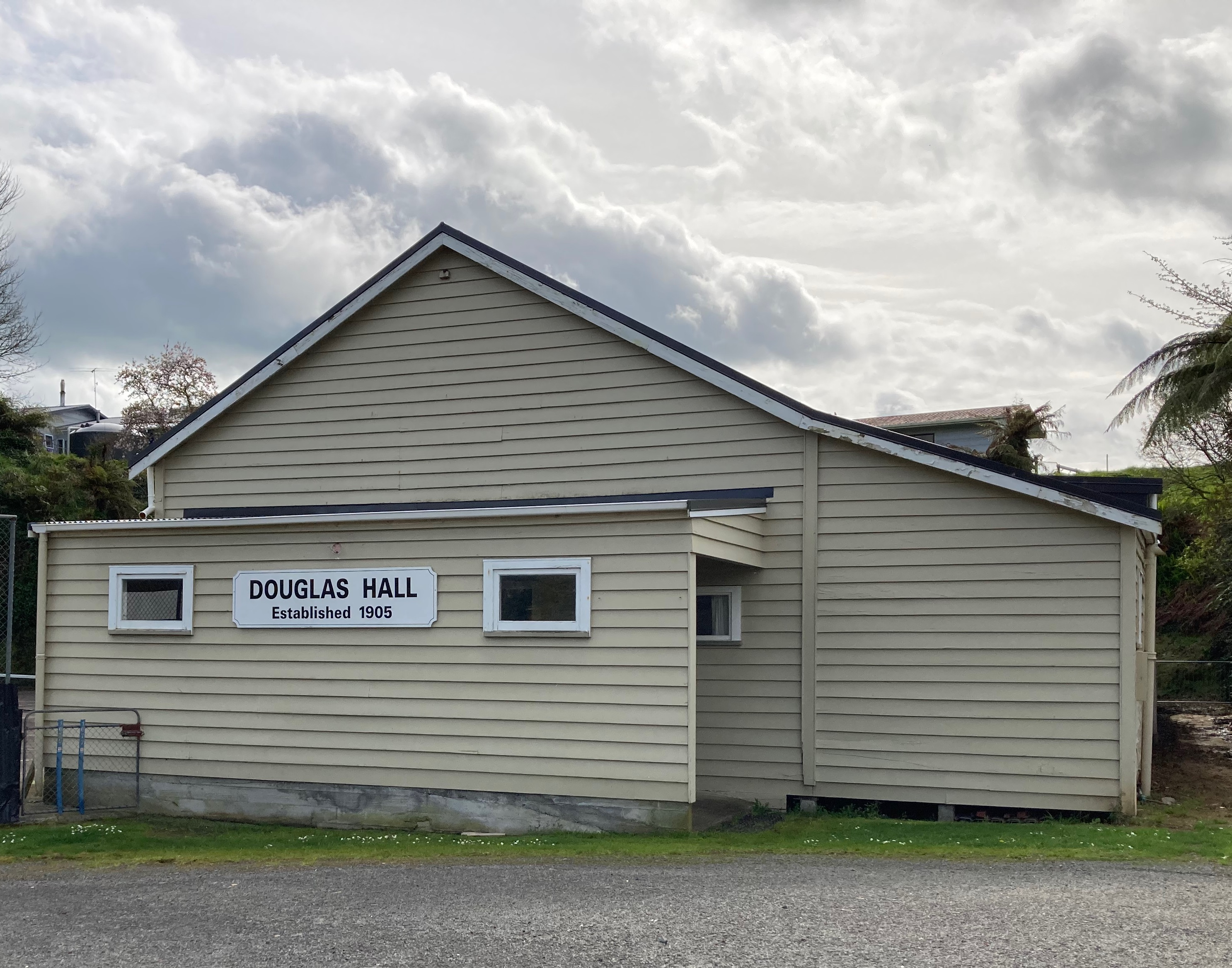
Douglas Hall, 2022

== Notable residents ==
- David Walter (born 1939), chairman of Taranaki Regional Council, mayor of Stratford District Council, chairman of Stratford County Council
- Edward Walter (1866–1932), member of parliament representing the Stratford electorate (1925–1928) and grandfather of David Walter
- Alan Smith (born 1942), All Black & Taranaki Rugby Football representative
