= Tututawa =

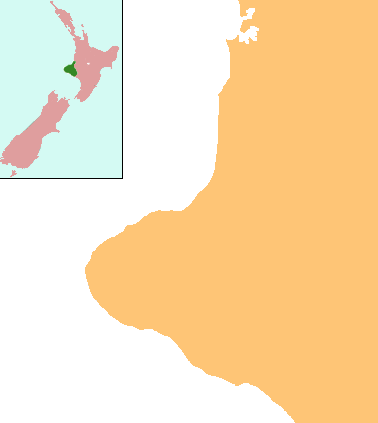
- Coordinates: 39°19′12″S 174°31′42″E
- Country: New Zealand
- Region: Taranaki
- District: Stratford District

Tututawa is a locality and rural centre in east Taranaki, New Zealand, 26 kilometres (16 mi) east of Stratford, with a population of approximately 70. The settlement is centred 5 kilometres (3.1 mi) south of Ohura Road (State Highway 43), at the intersection of Mangaotuku Road and Tututawa Road. Positioned approximately 150 metres (490 ft) above sea level, Tututawa is nestled in a valley amongst high sandstone and greywacke ridgelines. Within the area are the historic localities of Tewheniwheni, Mangaehu and Tawhiwhi.

== Geography ==
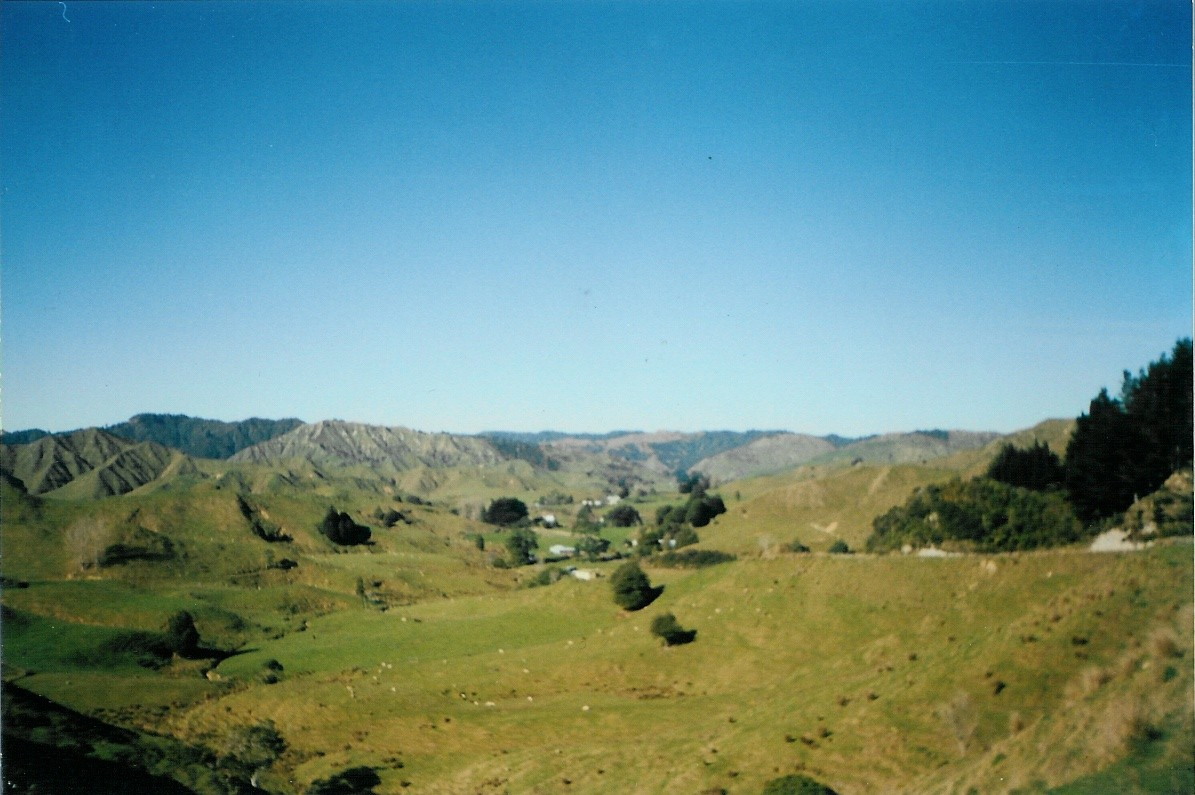
Looking south to Tututawa from the Tututawa Saddle, with Tututawa trig to the left, and Waitiri trig in the distance.

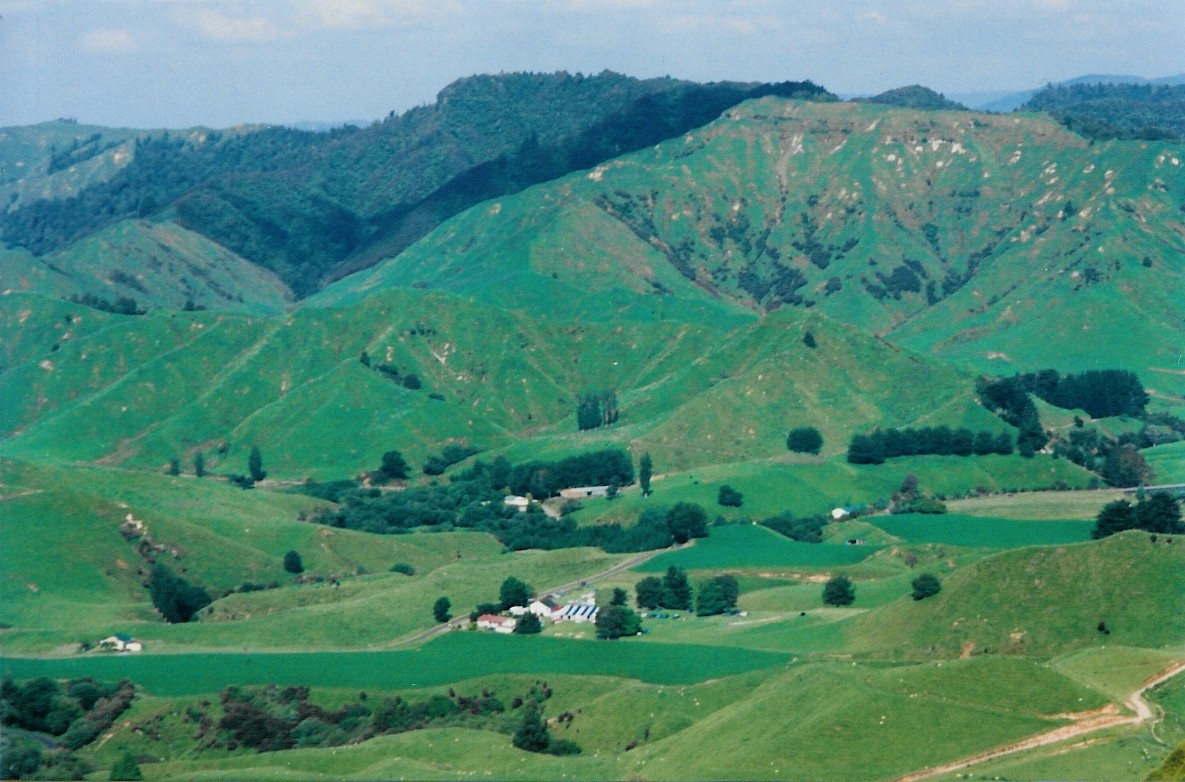
Looking south-east to Tututawa from the Mangaotuku trig. Mangaotuku Stream and Mangaotuku Road run left to right to the Mangaehu River bridge. Tututawa Stream and Tututawa Road meet the Mangaotuku amidst the willows, and the bush-clad Tututawa trig towers above in the background.

The valley is entered from the north via the Tututawa Saddle and Mangaotuku Road, which follows the meandering Mangaotuku Stream. At Tututawa the Tututawa Stream feeds into the Mangaotuku Stream, and the Mangaotuku meets the Mangaehu Stream. Similarly Tututawa Road, which runs along the Tututawa Stream valley, meets Mangaotuku Road, and Mangaotuku Road meets Mangaehu Road. The valley is surrounded by four high peaks; the Mangaotuku trig (365 m alt.) to the west, Popuanui (443m) to the east, Tututawa (451m) to the south-east and Waitiri (490m) to the south.

A bridge crosses the Mangaehu Stream to the south, and the road stretches across a small open plain to the intersection of Mangaotuku, Mangaehu and Soldiers Roads.

Mangaehu Road follows the valley floor of the upper Mangaehu Stream to the east to Puniwhakau, Makahu and Aotuhia, completing a loop to Strathmore and State Highway 43 via Brewer Road. The Tewheniwheni Stream feeds into the Mangaehu Stream east of the Tututawa trig, while the Pipi Stream runs northwards to the Mangaehu from the Waitiri trig.

Soldiers Road follows the Mangaehu Stream approx. 5 km to the west where it forks into two tributaries; Tauwharenikau Road and Perry Road. Tauwharenikau Road follows the stream of the same name south-east towards the Waitiri trig.

== Economy and culture ==
The area is predominantly reliant on pastoral farming, particularly sheep and beef farming, with a smattering of dairy grazing. Rivendell Gardens, a notable feature of Taranaki's Rhododendron Festival, is located on Tauwharenikau Road.

Community life centres on the Tututawa Hall and Domain, facilities which were once used as a school. Tututawa is home to the Mangaehu Dog Trial Club, and has produced a number of national champions in dog trials, as well as shearing and woodchopping. The Matemateāonga Range to the south are popular for pig and deer hunting.

== History ==
=== Māori settlement ===
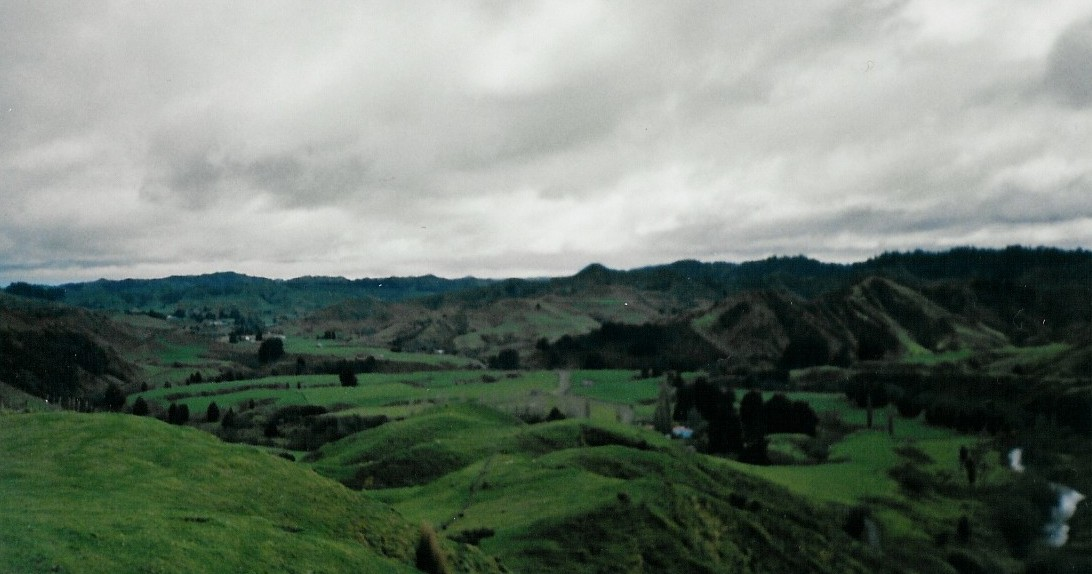
Looking north across the Tututawa Plain, bounded by the Mangaehu Stream, to the Mangaotuku Stream junction and Tututawa in the distance. Possible location of Makama, a Ngāti Ruanui village visited by Rev. Richard Taylor in 1846.

The name Tututawa is said to mean "bird snares set in Tawa trees", and this is affirmed by the significant population of kererū that graze upon the lush purple berries of the remaining Tawa trees. The name is likely to have been ascribed by the Inuawai hapū of the Ngāti Ruanui tribe, who once dwelt along the Mangaehu Stream and its tributaries.

The Rev. Richard Taylor visited these settlements in December 1846 and described a place called Makama – "a small open plain with two cottages in it".

Historian Ian Church writes;

They reached the first settlement at Makama – “a small open plain with two cottages in it” – where several people were at work on their cultivations. While Taylor was talking to a dozen of them a severe earthquake shook the ground for about two minutes; the locals said they could remember one earthquake when they could not stay on their feet. In the evening, prayers were held in “their place of assembly.”

The track followed up the Mangaotuku River “through a series of undulating grassy plains”.

According to Church, European settlers discovered a settlement site near Tututawa, and archaeological evidence has identified occupation sites along the Mangaehu Stream, both upstream and downstream from its junction with the Mangaotuku. Tututawa is located in close proximity to the historic Kaharoa Track, which followed the Kaharoa Range and the Mangaehu valley, linking Pātea to the Taumatamahoe Track.

=== European settlement ===
==== Purchase and settlement ====
On 16 December 1875 the New Zealand government purchased the 61,200-acre (248 km^{2}) Mangaotuku Block from Ngāti Ruanui and Ngāti Maru for £7650. Through the 1880s the government refrained from developing or selling this land, or from purchasing any more. Charles Brown negotiated the private purchase of the Toko, Huiakama and Pohokura blocks, and sold these to Thomas Bayly in June 1884.

In 1891 Palmerston North bootmaker Charles Stepney Gatton formed the Palmerston North Land Association to take advantage of the Liberal Government's land settlement scheme. Parts of the Mangaotuku, Toko and Huiakama blocks, in the area south of Ōhura Road between Douglas and Strathmore, were sold to the association. Ballots for 80-hectare sections were held in 1894 and those successful began to arrive in 1896.

==== Boom and bust ====
In July 1898 Robert Bennett Brickell and G. Moir lobbied the government for subsidies to improve Mangaotuku Road. In 1900 a 44-section township, with sites for school, creamery, police, government building, cemetery and recreation reserve, was surveyed by William Theodore Morpeth and originally named Mangaehu. A creamery was established by the Crown Dairy Company in 1900, later taken over by the Stratford Co-operative in 1903. Further government lobbying by Brickell and Moir led to the establishment of Tututawa Primary School on 25 February 1901. A community hall was opened on 13 December 1903, and soon a post office, telephone facilities, a store, a butcher and a blacksmith were also operating in the village.

Tututawa Road at this time crossed a saddle near the Tututawa trig, and ran down the Tewheniwheni valley to complete a loop to Tewheniwheni on Mangaehu Road. The now defunct Waitere Road provided a link to Omoana, climbing steeply to the Waitere trig and following the northern reaches of the Kahaora Range where a number of families were settled.

By 1906 it became clear that 80 hectares was not sufficient for settlers to make a living and that year saw a number of original settlers leave. The Puniwhakau Dairy Company, a local co-operative, had taken over the creamery from the Crown Dairy Company in October 1905, but by 1911 had amassed an overdraft of £2,800. The company was reconstructed as the Tututawa Co-operative by 1914.

In 1908 John Barrett Norris, formerly a teacher in Ireland, opened a school in his home near Tewheniwheni known as Mangaehu School. The school had a short life, closing in 1917. Following the First World War 1,243 hectares along Soldiers, Perry and Tauwherinikau Roads, known as the Tawhiwhi settlement, were subdivided into ten farms for returned soldiers. By October 1925, however, only one settler remained in Tawhiwhi due to economic hardship and access problems. The Tututawa Co-operative Dairy Company was liquidated in 1926.

==== Sports and social activities ====
Sports days and picnics were a popular form of community entertainment from early days, often held at the school grounds. The Mangaehu Dog Trial Club was formed in 1925, and to this day the yearly trials remain a focal point of community life and a national attraction to trialists. The Tututawa Domain Board was formed in 1931, contributing to the construction of tennis courts and attractive amenities surrounded by shrubs and lawns. Around this time a branch of the Women's’ Division of Federated Farmers (WDFF) was also established.

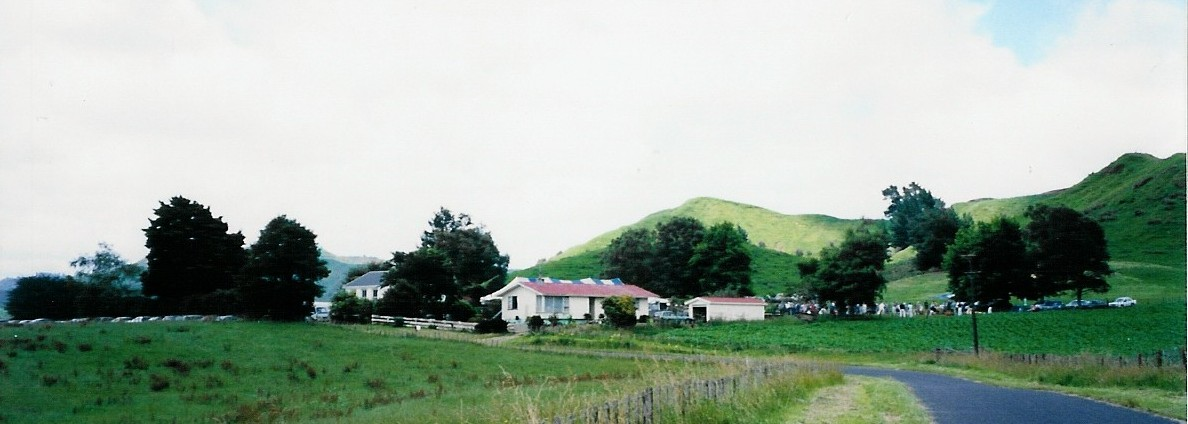
Tututawa Hall and old schoolhouse during the 2001 district Centennial.

==== Winding down ====
While electricity reached Tututawa in 1953, the same year saw the closing of the post office, followed three years later by the telephone office. The Domain Board and Hall Company merged in 1964, and the county took over the amenities the following year. Decline in the school roll led to consolidation with Douglas in 1969, helped by improvements to Mangaotuku Road over the Tututawa Saddle.

==== Consolidation ====
The last four decades has seen continued population decline, and the amalgamation and consolidation of farms. However the area continues to thrive as productive and economic sheep and beef farming land.
