= Stratford District, New Zealand =

District in Taranaki, New Zealand

Stratford District
- Territorial authority district
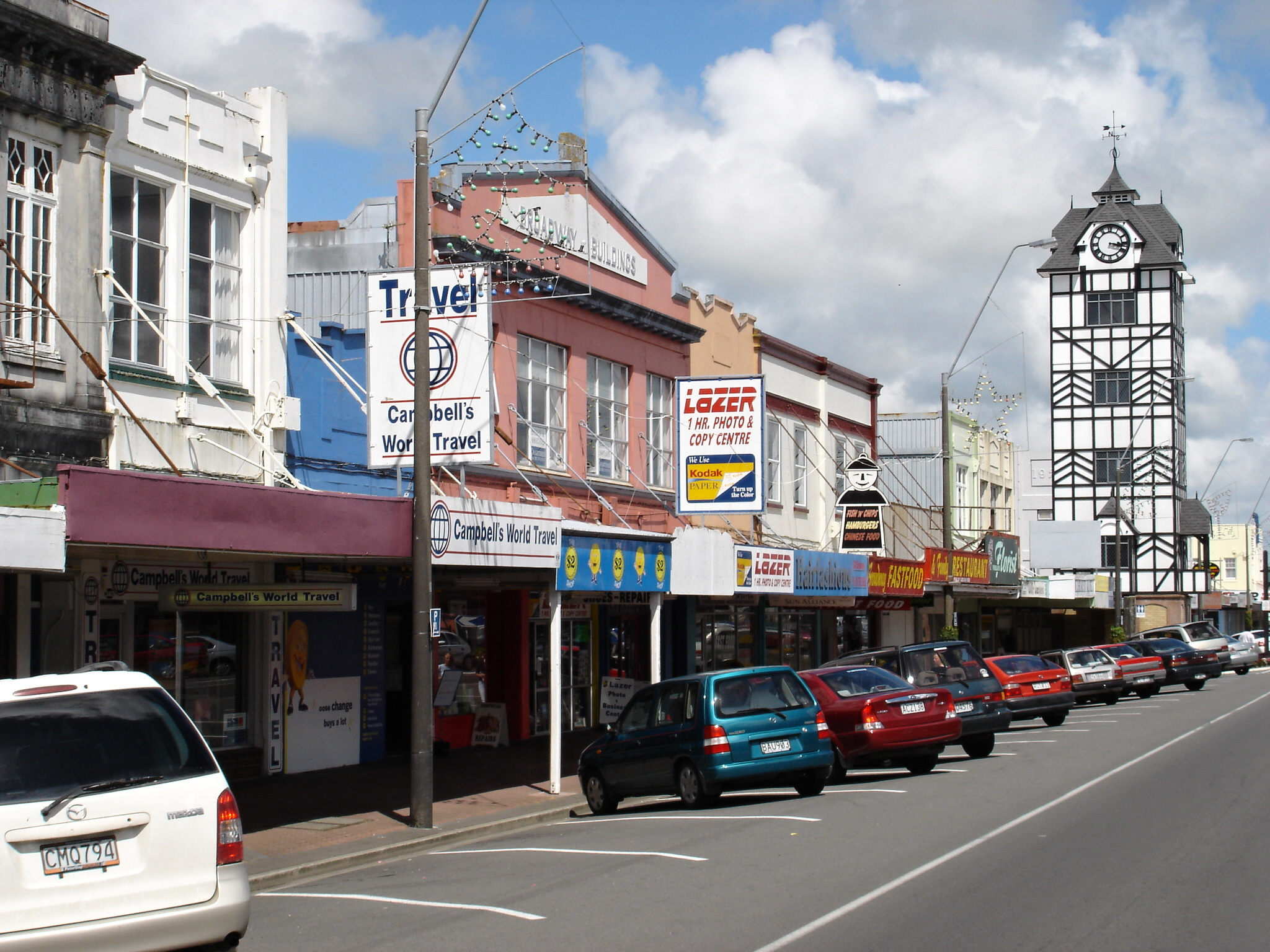
- Stratford main street

- Stratford district within the North Island
- Coordinates: 39.3406°S 174.2833°E
- Country: New Zealand
- Region: Taranaki
- Wards: Urban; Rural
- Seat: Stratford

Government
  - Mayor: Neil Volzke
  - Territorial authority: Stratford District Council

Area
  - Total: 2,163.43 km^{2} (835.30 sq mi)

Population (June 2025)
  - Total: 10,500
  - Density: 4.85/km^{2} (12.6/sq mi)
- Time zone: UTC+12 (NZST)
  - Summer (DST): UTC+13 (NZDT)
- Postcode(s): Map of postcodes
- Area code: 06
- Website: www.stratford.govt.nz

Stratford District is a territorial authority district in the North Island of New Zealand. The Stratford District Council is headquartered in the only town, Stratford. The district is divided between the Manawatū-Whanganui region (including the settlements of Whangamōmona, Marco and Tahora, 31.87% of its land area) and the Taranaki region (68.13% of its land area).

The district has an area of 2,163.43 square kilometres (835.30 sq mi). The population was 10,500 as of June 2025 which is 0.2% of the population of New Zealand. This comprises 6,430 people in the Stratford urban area, and 4,070 people in rural areas and settlements.

Mayor Neil Volzke was elected as mayor in a 2009 by-election, and most recently re-elected in the 2019 local elections.

== Council history ==
The first Stratford Town Board was formed in 1882. Stratford County Council was formed in 1890 and Stratford Borough Council was formed in 1898. The two merged to become Stratford District as part of the 1989 local government reforms.

=== Past mayors, chairmen, clerks and CEOs ===
==== Stratford Town Chairmen ====
- George Newsham Curtis (1882–1885)
- Charles Stuart Curtis (1885–1890)
- Ebenezer Burgess (1890–1892, 1896–1898)
- William Loftus Tocker (1892–1894)
- J B Patton (1894–1896)

==== Stratford Borough mayors ====
- Harry Norman Liardet (1898–1899, 1902–1903)
- Frederick James Steuart (1900–1901)
- Reginald Brooking Tatton (1901–1902)
- Nathaniel John King (1903–1907)
- Pilcher Frederick Ralfe (1907–1908)
- George A Sangster (1908–1910)
- Jonas Masters (1910–1912)
- William Patrick Kirkwood (1912–1915)
- Josephiah Wedgwood Boon (1915–1917)
- James Watson McMillan (1917–1929, 1933–1938)
- Percy Thomson (1929–1933, 1938–1947)
- Norman Harold Moss (1947–1957)
- George John Wedgwood Boon (1957–1971)
- Leo George Wellington Carrington (1971–1986)
- Lachlan Grant Bond (1986–1989)

==== Stratford County chairmen ====
- George Albert Marchant (1890–1892, 1905–1912)
- William Monkhouse (1892–1896)
- Joseph Mackay (1896–1899, 1900–1905)
- Richard Dingle (1900)
- William Hathaway (1912–1917)
- Edward Walter (1917–1925)
- Thomas Rheese Anderson (1925–1938)
- Joe C Best (1928–1946)
- Bruce Hutchen (1946–1970)
- Len C Harrison (1970–1977)
- HH Paul Cook (1977–1983)
- David Walter (1983–1989)

==== Stratford District Council mayors ====
- David Walter (1989–1998)
- Brian Robert Jeffares (1998–2007)
- John Edwards (2007–2009) (Died while in office)
- Neil Volzke (2009–)

==== Stratford Town Clerks ====
- Thomas Harry Penn (1898–1902)
- Ernest F Hemingway (1902–1911)
- Phillip Skogland (1911–1936)
- Gerald C Grace (1936–1975)
- P A Tourell (1975–1985)
- F W Bullen (1985–1989)

==== Stratford County Clerks ====
- William George Malone (1891–1900)
- Charles Penn (1900–1931)
- C L J Campbell (1931–1945)
- T A Jones (1945–1968)
- Ken J Little (1968–1975)
- MD Bell (1975–1977)
- Ross D Smith (1977–1989)

==== Stratford District Chief Executives ====
- Poiha Kemp Broughton (1989–2001)
- Wayne Allan Kimber (2001–2004)
- Michael Roy Freeman (2004–2011)
- Sue Davidson (2011–2014)
- Matt O'Mara (2015–2017)
- Sven Hanne (2017–)

== Demographics ==
Stratford District covers 2,163.43 km^{2} (835.30 sq mi) and had an estimated population of 10,500 as of June 2025, with a population density of 4.9 people per km^{2}.

Historical population
Year	Pop.	±% p.a.
2006	8,889	—
2013	8,988	+0.16%
2018	9,474	+1.06%
2023	10,149	+1.39%

Stratford District had a population of 10,149 in the 2023 New Zealand census, an increase of 675 people (7.1%) since the 2018 census, and an increase of 1,161 people (12.9%) since the 2013 census. There were 5,064 males, 5,058 females and 27 people of other genders in 3,933 dwellings. 2.2% of people identified as LGBTIQ+. The median age was 40.0 years (compared with 38.1 years nationally). There were 2,097 people (20.7%) aged under 15 years, 1,665 (16.4%) aged 15 to 29, 4,515 (44.5%) aged 30 to 64, and 1,872 (18.4%) aged 65 or older.

People could identify as more than one ethnicity. The results were 90.2% European (Pākehā); 15.6% Māori; 1.7% Pasifika; 3.4% Asian; 0.4% Middle Eastern, Latin American and African New Zealanders (MELAA); and 3.2% other, which includes people giving their ethnicity as "New Zealander". English was spoken by 97.5%, Māori language by 2.5%, Samoan by 0.2% and other languages by 4.6%. No language could be spoken by 2.1% (e.g. too young to talk). New Zealand Sign Language was known by 0.7%. The percentage of people born overseas was 11.0, compared with 28.8% nationally.

Religious affiliations were 31.0% Christian, 0.5% Hindu, 0.1% Islam, 0.4% Māori religious beliefs, 0.2% Buddhist, 0.6% New Age, and 0.8% other religions. People who answered that they had no religion were 56.4%, and 10.0% of people did not answer the census question.

Of those at least 15 years old, 705 (8.8%) people had a bachelor's or higher degree, 4,827 (59.9%) had a post-high school certificate or diploma, and 2,307 (28.7%) people exclusively held high school qualifications. The median income was $36,900, compared with $41,500 nationally. 528 people (6.6%) earned over $100,000 compared to 12.1% nationally. The employment status of those at least 15 was that 4,038 (50.1%) people were employed full-time, 1,125 (14.0%) were part-time, and 204 (2.5%) were unemployed.

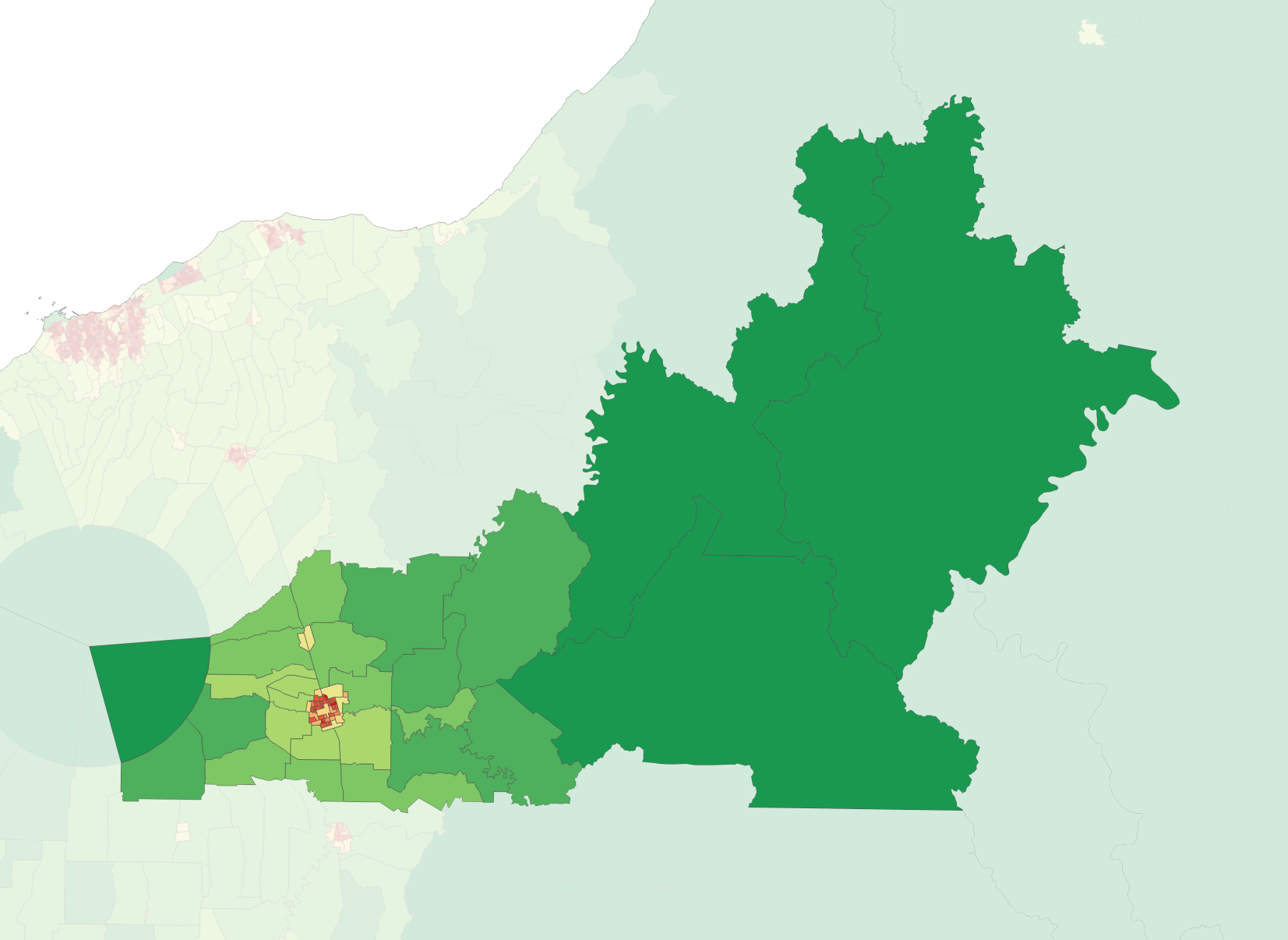
Population density in the 2023 census

Individual wards
Name	Area (km^{2})	Population	Density (per km^{2})	Dwellings	Median age	Median income
Stratford Rural General Ward	2,154.15	3,747	1.7	1,416	39.2 years	$41,600
Stratford Urban General Ward	9.28	6,402	689.9	2,514	40.4 years	$34,100
New Zealand					38.1 years	$41,500

== Physical geography ==
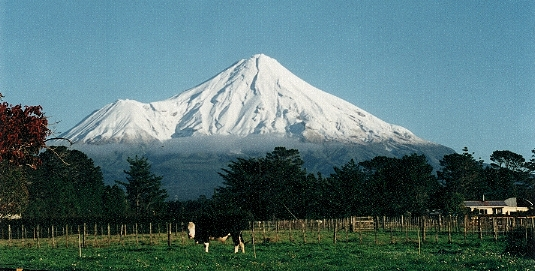
Stratford's view of Mount Taranaki (facing west), with Fanthams Peak to the left of the main peak. Stratford is a service town for the many dairy farms of Taranaki.

The Stratford District takes in about one quarter of the Taranaki Region, and includes four major geological features: the Taranaki volcanic cone, its associated ring plain, the Pātea River catchment, and the eastern hill country.

=== Taranaki Volcanic Cone ===
The south-eastern face of Mount Taranaki is in the Stratford district, the north-westernmost point of the district being the 2518 m high peak. From the peak, the boundaries run almost due east and due south.

Pembroke Road winds up the mountain slope from Stratford to a carpark and lookout at "The Plateau", at 1,172 m (3,845 ft) Manganui skifield is a short hike from the carpark, across the Manganui Gorge.

On the south-eastern face of the mountain, Manaia Road provides access to Dawson Falls and the Konini Lodge, at 890 m (2,920 ft) altitude. The natural Wilkies Pools are a short hike above the lodge.

=== Taranaki Volcanic Ring Plain ===
The Taranaki volcanic ring plain provides a steady contour with a subtle gradient, upon which Stratford and its environs have been settled. The easy gradient and rich volcanic soils and the high level of rainfall provide high quality pasture and agricultural land. Within this area the ring plain is drained by three river catchments: the Manganui River catchment to the north, the Waingongoro River catchment to the south, and the dominant Pātea River catchment.

=== Pātea River ===
The headwaters of the Pātea River are on the eastern face of Mount Taranaki, above Stratford. From there the river flows eastwards, its upper catchment taking in a narrow area of land between the Manganui River catchment to the north and the Waingongoro River catchment to the south.

Stratford is on the banks of the Pātea River, at the junction of the Pātea River and Paetahi Stream, approximately 15 km (9.3 mi) east of the headwaters. Due to the narrow width of the catchment, the southern boundary of the town is on the Pātea/Waingongoro divide, while 4 km (2.5 mi) to the north Midhirst is on the Pātea/Manganui divide.

Beyond Stratford the catchment widens significantly to include a number of ancient swamps, including Ngaere and Toko, and also the Kahouri and Piakau ring plain streams. The river then takes in the expansive eastern hill country catchments of the Toko, Makuri, Mangaehu, Mangaotuku, Puniwhakau and Makahu Streams, before winding its way southwards through the hills of the South Taranaki district, to its mouth at Pātea.

=== Eastern hill country ===
Beyond Stratford, the district extends approximately 45 km (28 mi) to the east, between the Waitara River to the north and the Matemateāonga Range to the south, with the Whanganui River and Heao Stream constituting much of the district's eastern boundary. This area is dominated by steep sandstone, greywacke and mudstone hills and winding valleys. Much of the steep and isolated hill country is in native or exotic forestry. The remainder of the district is in sheep and/or beef pastoral farming.

Much of the eastern hill country falls within the catchment of the Pātea River and its tributaries. However, to the north, the district takes in Waitara River and its tributaries, including the Makara, Makino, Matau, Mangapapa and Mangaowata catchments. At its northernmost point, the district also includes the Mt Damper Stream and its associated swamp and falls, which feed into the Tongaporutu River.

In the east, the district takes in the Whangamōmona River catchment, and also most of the Tangarakau River catchment, both of which feed into the Whanganui River. This area is separated from the west by the densely forested Whangamōmona Saddle, making it an isolated and distinctive part of the district, and the area once had its own county council.

To the south-east, the district also takes in the upper reaches of the Waitōtara River catchment, within the Matemateāonga Range and the Waitōtara Conservation Area.

=== Surrounding settlements ===
Stratford is surrounded by a number of small villages and settlements. To the north on State Highway 3 are Midhirst and beyond that Waipuku, and to the south is the locality of Ngaere. Cardiff, Mahoe, Rowan and Pembroke are beneath the mountain to the west, and Wharehuia, Tuna, Te Popo and Kupe are to the north-east.

To the east, along State Highway 43 and the Stratford-Okahukura railway, lie settlements that in their heyday were bustling villages. Toko and the renowned Whangamōmona have retained their character as villages, while the settlements of Douglas, Strathmore, Huiakama, Te Wera, Pohokura, Marco, Kohuratahi and Tahora now consist of no more than a few houses. Along roads off State Highway 3 are a number of other settlements, some of which were also once bustling villages. Huiroa, Kiore, Matau and Mt. Damper are to the north and west of the highway, and Huinga, Tututawa, Puniwhakau, Makahu, Aotuhia and Tangarakau are to the south and east.

== National parks ==
Stratford is the gateway to two National Parks – Egmont National Park to the west, and Whanganui National Park to the east (via Kohi Saddle, Aotuhia).

== Economy ==
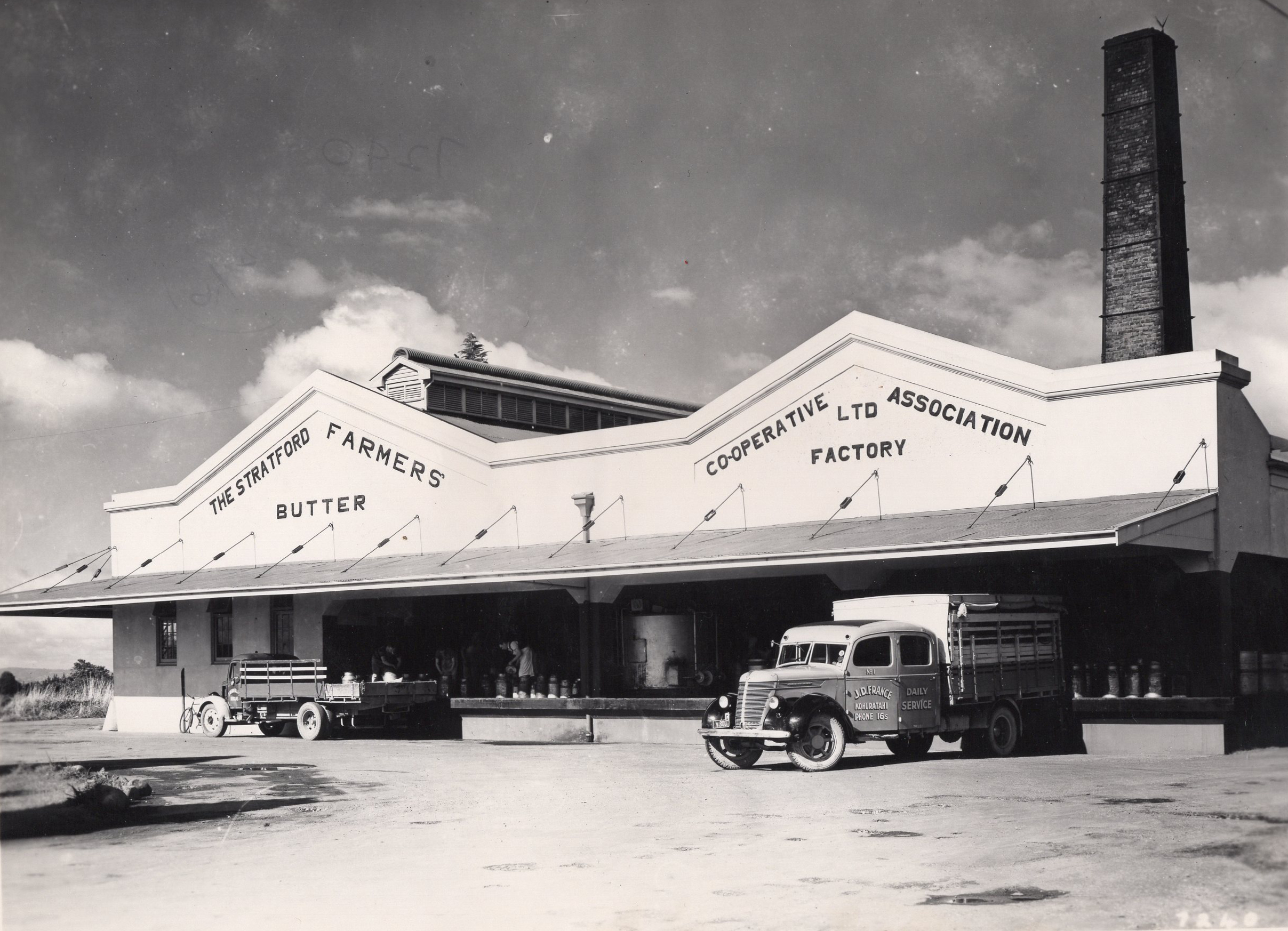
Stratford Farmers Butter Factory

The Egmont Ring Plain provides steady contours and fertile volcanic soils which, together with the high level of rainfall, make for some of the best dairy country in New Zealand. The district is predominantly dairying (57,300 dairy cattle), while the rolling to steep eastern hill country supports dry stock farming and forestry (42,000 beef cattle; 281,300 sheep).

The energy and tourism industries are both of growing significance to the Stratford District. The Stratford Power Station is located 3 km (1.9 mi) east of the town.

== Education ==
There are two secondary schools in Stratford: Stratford High School and Taranaki Diocesan School for Girls. There are three primary schools within Stratford township: Stratford Primary School, Avon School and St Joseph's School

There are seven primary schools in the surrounding district. Recent years have seen the consolidation of a large number of schools into these seven schools:

- Midhirst School
- Ngaere School
- Pembroke School
- Toko School
- Huiakama School
- Marco School
- Makahu School

== Sister cities ==
Stratford is a member of the Stratford Sister Cities program, which was created to promote friendship and cultural exchange between participating countries. Participation is restricted to places called "Stratford" that have a Shakespeare Theatre or Festival. A reunion is held every second year by a different member.

The five principal sister cities of Stratford, New Zealand are:

- Stratford-upon-Avon, England
- Stratford, Victoria, Australia
- Stratford, Ontario, Canada
- Stratford, Connecticut, United States
- Stratford, Prince Edward Island, Canada

== See also ==
- List of historic places in Stratford District
