= Makuri Stream =

Stream in Taranaki, New Zealand

Coordinates: 39°21′S 174°26′E

The Makuri Stream is a tributary of the Pātea River, in the upper catchment among the eastern Taranaki hill country. The Makuri catchment falls entirely within the Stratford district, and takes in the settlements of Huinga, Huiroa and Kiore.

== Geography ==
The valley floor lies between 150 and 200 metres (490 and 660 ft) above sea level, most of which was originally swamplands but is now reclaimed pasture. Rising on each side of the Makuri Stream are often precipitous sandstone-greywacke ridges which vary in height from approximately 300 metres (980 ft) in elevation to the peaks of the Mangaotuku and Tarerepo trigs, 365 and 366 metres (1,198 and 1,201 ft) respectively.

== Access ==
The Makuri Valley has three different points of access from the populated west. The southern end of the valley where the stream meets the Pātea River is accessed via Toko Road and the settlement of Huinga. State Highway 43 crosses the Makuri valley between the Douglas and Strathmore Saddles, where Walter Road gives access to the Makuri valley to the north, and Mangaotuku Road gives access to the south. The upper parts of the catchment are reached via Douglas Road and the settlements of Huiroa and Kiore.

== Land use ==
Nearly all of the catchment is cleared of bush, and is farmed predominantly as sheep and beef units.
