= Ngaere =

- Coordinates: 39°23′25″S 174°17′58″E
- Country: New Zealand
- Region: Taranaki
- District: Stratford District
- Ward: Stratford Rural General Ward; Stratford Māori Ward
- Electorates: Whanganui; Te Tai Hauāuru (Māori)

Government
  - Territorial Authority: Stratford District Council
  - Regional council: Taranaki Regional Council
  - Mayor of Stratford: Neil Volzke
  - Whanganui MP: Carl Bates
  - Te Tai Hauāuru MP: Debbie Ngarewa-Packer

Ngaere is a village situated on State Highway 3, 4 kilometres (2.5 mi) south of Stratford, New Zealand. The name "Ngaere" means "swamp" in English, and before settlement, the area was covered by a vast and ancient wetland. Until 1966, Ngaere also had a railway station.

== Demographics ==
Ngaere locality covers 37.62 km^{2} (14.53 sq mi). The locality is partly in the Pembroke statistical area and partly in the Toko statistical area.

Historical population
Year	Pop.	±% p.a.
2006	249	—
2013	219	−1.82%
2018	243	+2.10%
2023	234	−0.75%

Ngaere had a population of 234 in the 2023 New Zealand census, a decrease of 9 people (−3.7%) since the 2018 census, and an increase of 15 people (6.8%) since the 2013 census. There were 108 males, 123 females, and 3 people of other genders in 90 dwellings. 2.6% of people identified as LGBTIQ+. There were 39 people (16.7%) aged under 15 years, 48 (20.5%) aged 15 to 29, 120 (51.3%) aged 30 to 64, and 24 (10.3%) aged 65 or older.

People could identify as more than one ethnicity. The results were 94.9% European (Pākehā), 16.7% Māori, and 7.7% other, which includes people giving their ethnicity as "New Zealander". English was spoken by 98.7%, Māori by 3.8%, and other languages by 6.4%. No language could be spoken by 1.3% (e.g. too young to talk). New Zealand Sign Language was known by 1.3%. The percentage of people born overseas was 5.1, compared with 28.8% nationally.

Religious affiliations were 25.6% Christian, 1.3% Buddhist, and 2.6% New Age. People who answered that they had no religion were 65.4%, and 6.4% of people did not answer the census question.

Of those at least 15 years old, 18 (9.2%) people had a bachelor's or higher degree, 123 (63.1%) had a post-high school certificate or diploma, and 48 (24.6%) people exclusively held high school qualifications. 21 people (10.8%) earned over $100,000 compared to 12.1% nationally. The employment status of those at least 15 was 111 (56.9%) full-time, 33 (16.9%) part-time, and 3 (1.5%) unemployed.

== Attractions ==
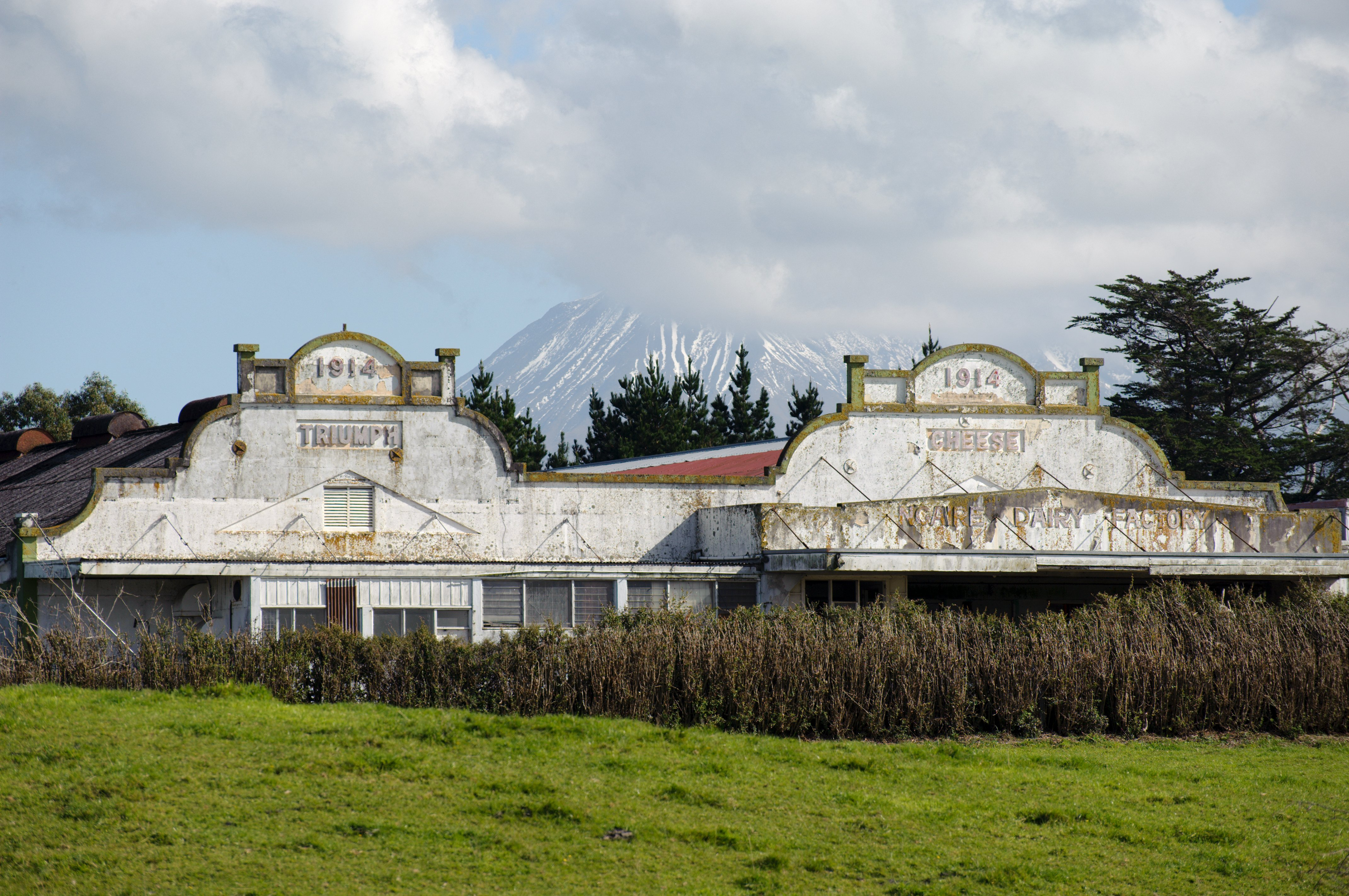
Ngaere Dairy Factory

Ngaere Gardens, which once hosted a menagerie of exotic animals, was a popular picnic spot for early 20th century families. Several attempts at resurrecting the gardens have been to no avail. The gardens have now been cleared, and all that remains now is the large lake, and a number of mature exotic trees.

Another well-known landmark is the Ngaere dairy factory, founded in 1914. It produced its own brand of cheese called "Triumph". The Ngaere factory closed in 1973, after the Ngaere dairy cooperative merged into the Taranaki dairy cooperative. Since its closure, the factory has been put to many uses - as a clothing factory, an indoor cricket arena, a rave dance hall, and currently a saw mill.

Ngaere had a service station, which closed in the 1990s. The building has been put to a variety of uses, including as a brewery and a health shop. It is currently a motorcycle repair shop. "Fred's Place" is well known for its antiques.

== Local Legends ==
Maori legend says that the Ngaere swamp was formed when Mt. Taranaki stopped and wept on its journey to its current resting place. Most of the swamp was drained in the early 20th century for dairy farming.

== Name ==
It has been speculated that Ngaere, which until 1934 was also spelt Ngaire, is the origin of the name Ngaire, a common girl's name in New Zealand.

== Education ==
Ngaere School is a coeducational full primary (years 1-8) school with a roll of 151 as of July 2025. The school was founded in 1882.
