= Marco, New Zealand =

Marco
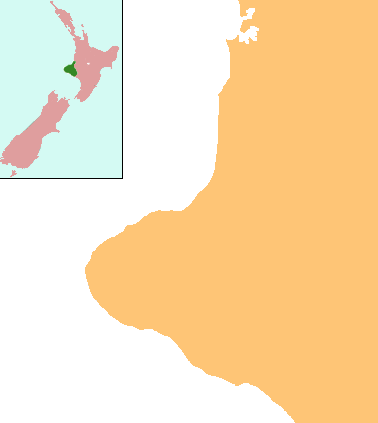
- Coordinates: 39°6′27″S 174°45′2″E
- Country: New Zealand
- Region: Manawatū-Whanganui region
- District: Stratford District

Marco is a settlement in the Stratford District and the Manawatū-Whanganui region, in the western North Island of New Zealand. It is located to the northeast of Whangamōmona on State Highway 43. The Whangamōmona River flows through the area. The Stratford - Okahukura railway line passes to the northwest of the settlement.

The settlement is named from Marco Road, which runs a short distance to the northwest. The road was named after a dog owned by the district surveyor, Mr Sladden. Marco was killed in the middle of the road line by a huge boar while he and his master were pig hunting.

== Education ==
Marco School is a coeducational full primary school (years 1–8) with a roll of 14 students as of March 2026. The principal is Anna Stockman and there are two part time teachers, Claire Hunger and Gwenda Pease. The students are predominantly from farming backgrounds and enjoy a rural focus education. Marco School is part of the Eastern Districts Cluster which is made up of Marco, Huiakama, Makaahu and Toko schools. The school opened on 21 March 1898. Until November 1905, it was known as Upper Whangamomona School. Hurimoana School merged with Marco in 1929
