= Tahora, Manawatū-Whanganui =

Tahora
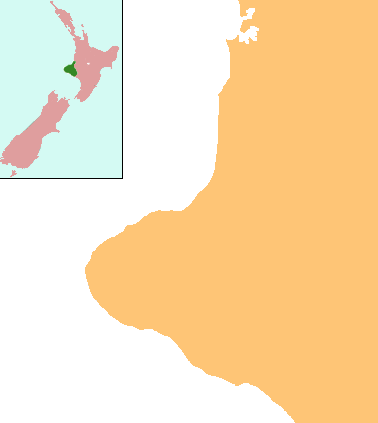
- Coordinates: 39°1′52″S 174°48′12″E
- Country: New Zealand
- Region: Manawatū-Whanganui region
- District: Stratford District

Tahorapāroa, formerly called Tahora, is a small settlement in the Stratford District and the Manawatū-Whanganui region in the North Island of New Zealand along the Stratford–Okahukura railway line and State Highway 43 between Stratford and Taumarunui. It was the location of an annual folk music festival for 30 years.

Tahora was renamed Tahorapāroa by the Ngā Pou Taunaha o Aotearoa New Zealand Geographic Board in 2025. Also renamed was the Tahora Saddle to Tahorapāroa Saddle and the Tahora Scenic Reserve to Tahorapāroa Scenic Reserve.
