= Makahu =

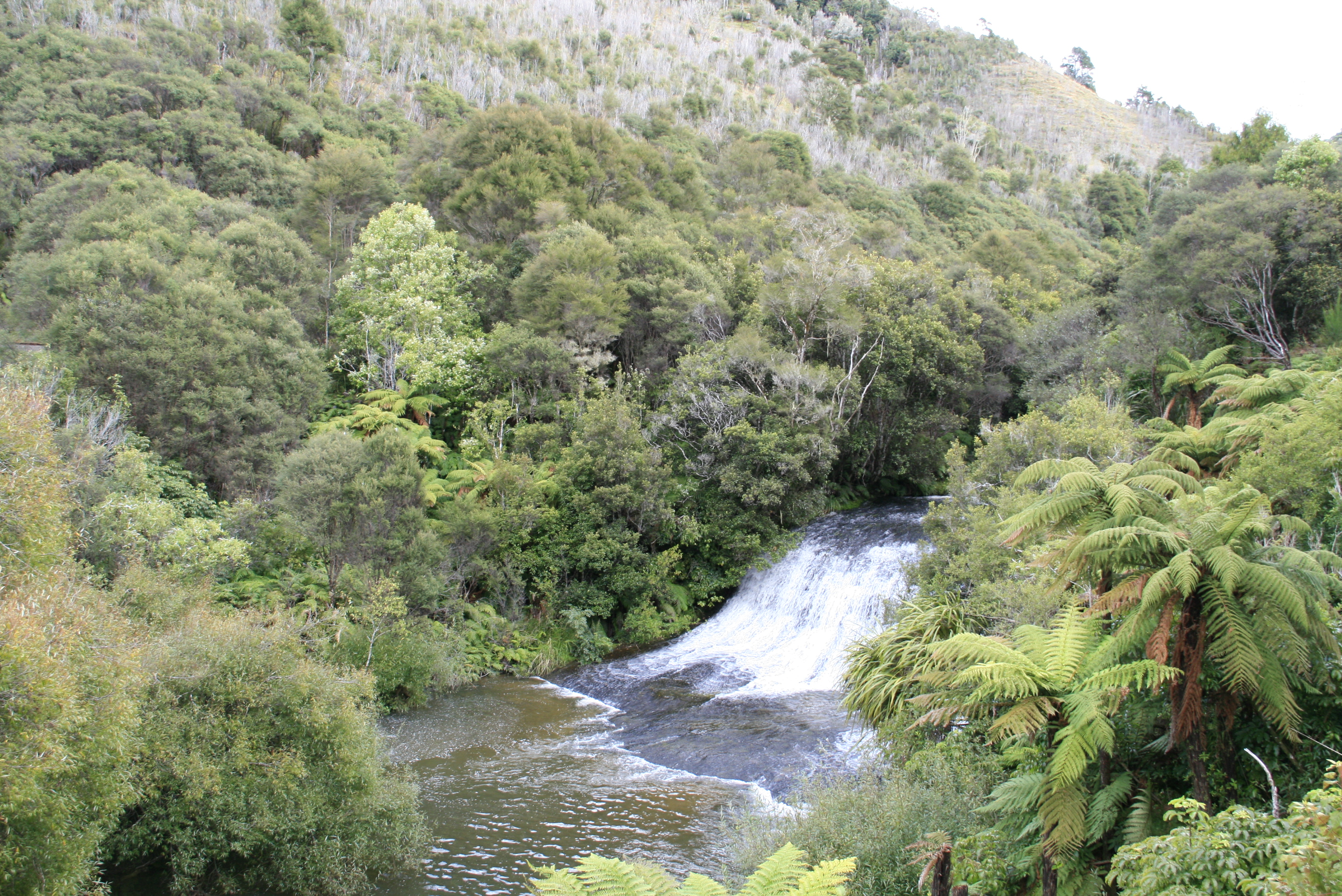
- Waterfall near the Makahu tunnel
- Interactive map of Makahu
- Coordinates: 39°16′54″S 174°37′50″E
- Country: New Zealand
- Region: Taranaki
- District: Stratford District
- Ward: Stratford Rural General Ward; Stratford Māori Ward
- Electorates: Taranaki-King Country; Te Tai Hauāuru (Māori)

Government
  - Territorial Authority: Stratford District Council
  - Regional council: Taranaki Regional Council
  - Mayor of Stratford: Neil Volzke
  - Taranaki-King Country MP: Barbara Kuriger
  - Te Tai Hauāuru MP: Debbie Ngarewa-Packer

Makahu is a settlement in inland Taranaki, in the western North Island of New Zealand. It is located to the southeast of Strathmore. The Makahu Stream runs south through the area to join with the Mangaehu Stream, which flows into the Patea River.

The name "Makahu" means "White Hawk".

== Demographics ==
Makahu locality covers 470.43 km^{2} (181.63 sq mi) and includes an area within the Stratford District east of Strathmore. The locality is part of the larger Douglas statistical area.

Historical population
Year	Pop.	±% p.a.
2006	216	—
2013	168	−3.53%
2018	204	+3.96%
2023	189	−1.52%

Makahu had a population of 189 in the 2023 New Zealand census, a decrease of 15 people (−7.4%) since the 2018 census, and an increase of 21 people (12.5%) since the 2013 census. There were 108 males and 81 females in 75 dwellings. The median age was 37.3 years (compared with 38.1 years nationally). There were 51 people (27.0%) aged under 15 years, 27 (14.3%) aged 15 to 29, 81 (42.9%) aged 30 to 64, and 30 (15.9%) aged 65 or older.

People could identify as more than one ethnicity. The results were 95.2% European (Pākehā), 19.0% Māori, 1.6% Asian, and 3.2% other, which includes people giving their ethnicity as "New Zealander". English was spoken by 95.2%, Māori by 1.6%, and other languages by 1.6%. No language could be spoken by 3.2% (e.g. too young to talk). The percentage of people born overseas was 6.3, compared with 28.8% nationally.

Religious affiliations were 28.6% Christian, and 1.6% other religions. People who answered that they had no religion were 61.9%, and 7.9% of people did not answer the census question.

Of those at least 15 years old, 18 (13.0%) people had a bachelor's or higher degree, 90 (65.2%) had a post-high school certificate or diploma, and 33 (23.9%) people exclusively held high school qualifications. The median income was $36,300, compared with $41,500 nationally. 6 people (4.3%) earned over $100,000 compared to 12.1% nationally. The employment status of those at least 15 was 78 (56.5%) full-time, 27 (19.6%) part-time, and 3 (2.2%) unemployed.

== Education ==
Makahu School is a coeducational full primary school (years 1–8) with a roll of 18 as of July 2026. The school was founded in 1905, and is listed in the Stratford District Council’s Heritage Inventory due to its historical and social significance to the area.

== Notable people ==
- Kelly Jury, Silver Fern netball player
