= Te Popo =

- Interactive map of Te Popo
- Coordinates: 39°15′58″S 174°21′58″E
- Country: New Zealand
- Region: Taranaki Region
- Territorial authority: Stratford District
- Ward: Stratford Rural General Ward; Stratford Māori Ward
- Electorates: Taranaki-King Country; Te Tai Hauāuru (Māori)

Government
  - Territorial Authority: Stratford District Council
  - Regional council: Taranaki Regional Council
  - Mayor of Stratford: Neil Volzke
  - Taranaki-King Country MP: Barbara Kuriger
  - Te Tai Hauāuru MP: Debbie Ngarewa-Packer

Te Popo is a settlement in inland Taranaki, in the western North Island of New Zealand. It is located ten kilometres northeast of Stratford.

== Demographics ==
Te Popo locality covers 58.27 km^{2} (22.50 sq mi). The locality is part of the Toko statistical area.

Historical population
Year	Pop.	±% p.a.
2013	153	—
2018	147	−0.80%
2023	159	+1.58%

Te Popo had a population of 159 in the 2023 New Zealand census, an increase of 12 people (8.2%) since the 2018 census, and an increase of 6 people (3.9%) since the 2013 census. There were 75 males and 87 females in 63 dwellings. The median age was 37.9 years (compared with 38.1 years nationally). There were 36 people (22.6%) aged under 15 years, 21 (13.2%) aged 15 to 29, 81 (50.9%) aged 30 to 64, and 21 (13.2%) aged 65 or older.

People could identify as more than one ethnicity. The results were 98.1% European (Pākehā), and 15.1% Māori. English was spoken by 98.1%, and other languages by 3.8%. No language could be spoken by 3.8% (e.g. too young to talk). The percentage of people born overseas was 9.4, compared with 28.8% nationally.

Religious affiliations were 34.0% Christian, and 1.9% New Age. People who answered that they had no religion were 52.8%, and 11.3% of people did not answer the census question.

Of those at least 15 years old, 21 (17.1%) people had a bachelor's or higher degree, 75 (61.0%) had a post-high school certificate or diploma, and 33 (26.8%) people exclusively held high school qualifications. The median income was $40,800, compared with $41,500 nationally. 9 people (7.3%) earned over $100,000 compared to 12.1% nationally. The employment status of those at least 15 was 69 (56.1%) full-time, 21 (17.1%) part-time, and 3 (2.4%) unemployed.

== Education ==
Akland primary school opened in 1911, and changed its name to Te Popo School in 1928. It closed in 1967.
