= Midhirst =

Settlement in Taranaki Region, New Zealand

- Interactive map of Midhirst
- Coordinates: 39°17′36″S 174°15′59″E
- Country: New Zealand
- Region: Taranaki Region
- Territorial authority: Stratford District
- Ward: Stratford Rural General Ward; Stratford Māori Ward
- Electorates: Taranaki-King Country; Te Tai Hauāuru (Māori)

Government
  - Territorial Authority: Stratford District Council
  - Regional council: Taranaki Regional Council
  - Mayor of Stratford: Neil Volzke
  - Taranaki-King Country MP: Barbara Kuriger
  - Te Tai Hauāuru MP: Debbie Ngarewa-Packer

Area
  - Total: 1.83 km^{2} (0.71 sq mi)

Population (June 2025)
  - Total: 280
  - Density: 150/km^{2} (400/sq mi)

Midhirst is a small village in Taranaki, New Zealand, approximately 4 km north of Stratford, on State Highway 3. Inglewood is 17 km (11 mi) north of Midhirst, and New Plymouth is 35 km (22 mi) to the northwest.

== Demographics ==
Midhirst is described by Stats NZ as a rural settlement, which covers 1.83 km^{2} (0.71 sq mi). iT had an estimated population of 280 as of June 2025, with a population density of 153 people per km^{2}. It is part of the larger Pembroke statistical area.

Historical population
Year	Pop.	±% p.a.
2006	228	—
2013	237	+0.55%
2018	252	+1.23%
2023	276	+1.84%

Midhirst had a population of 276 in the 2023 New Zealand census, an increase of 24 people (9.5%) since the 2018 census, and an increase of 39 people (16.5%) since the 2013 census. There were 138 males and 138 females in 114 dwellings. 3.3% of people identified as LGBTIQ+. The median age was 42.5 years (compared with 38.1 years nationally). There were 51 people (18.5%) aged under 15 years, 51 (18.5%) aged 15 to 29, 132 (47.8%) aged 30 to 64, and 42 (15.2%) aged 65 or older.

People could identify as more than one ethnicity. The results were 90.2% European (Pākehā); 15.2% Māori; 3.3% Asian; 1.1% Middle Eastern, Latin American and African New Zealanders (MELAA); and 4.3% other, which includes people giving their ethnicity as "New Zealander". English was spoken by 95.7%, Māori by 5.4%, and other languages by 4.3%. No language could be spoken by 4.3% (e.g. too young to talk). New Zealand Sign Language was known by 1.1%. The percentage of people born overseas was 13.0, compared with 28.8% nationally.

Religious affiliations were 28.3% Christian, and 2.2% Hindu. People who answered that they had no religion were 62.0%, and 9.8% of people did not answer the census question.

Of those at least 15 years old, 18 (8.0%) people had a bachelor's or higher degree, 129 (57.3%) had a post-high school certificate or diploma, and 75 (33.3%) people exclusively held high school qualifications. The median income was $40,600, compared with $41,500 nationally. 9 people (4.0%) earned over $100,000 compared to 12.1% nationally. The employment status of those at least 15 was 126 (56.0%) full-time, 33 (14.7%) part-time, and 3 (1.3%) unemployed.

== Education ==
Midhirst School is a coeducational full primary (years 1-8) school with a roll of 134 students as of July 2026. The school was founded in 1880.
