= Whangamōmona River =

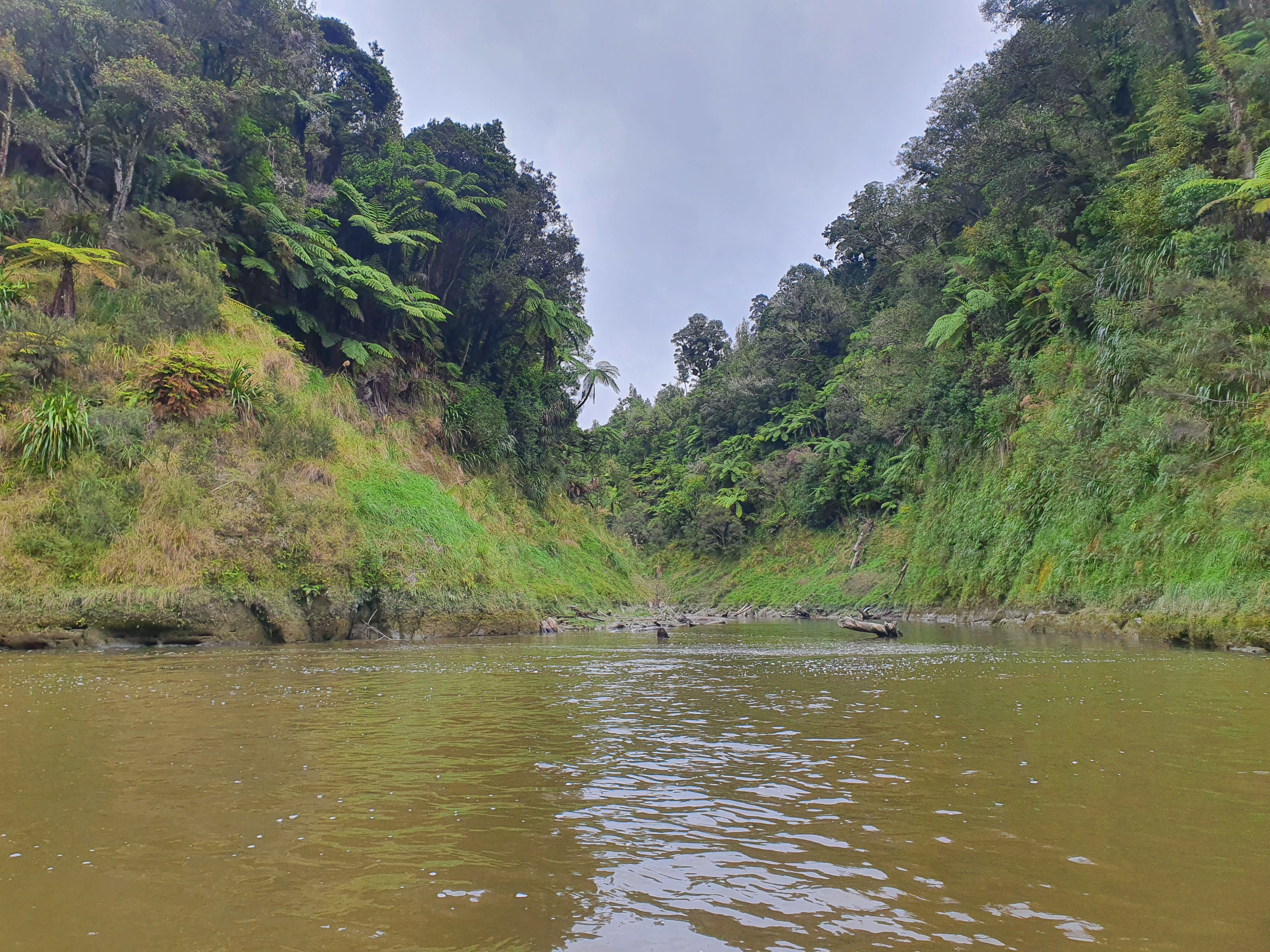
- Confluence of Whangamōmona River and Whanganui River
- Etymology: Māori meaning bountiful valley
- Native name: Whangamōmona (Māori)

Location
- Country: New Zealand
- Region: Manawatū-Whanganui
- District: Stratford
- Towns: Whangamōmona
- Settlements: Kohuratahi, Marco

Physical characteristics
- Source: Tahora Saddle
  - coordinates: 39°3′53″S 174°47′37″E
  - elevation: 275 m (902 ft)
- Mouth: Whanganui River
  - coordinates: 39°16′17″S 174°53′23″E
  - elevation: 82 m (269 ft)
- Length: 54 km (34 mi)

Basin features
- Progression: Whangamōmona River → Whanganui River
- River system: Whanganui River
- Tributaries
  - left: Mangare Stream, Poarangi Stream, Kuri Stream, Otomaroto Stream
  - right: Mangatuhua Stream, Arnold Stream, Miro Stream, Taumata Stream, Ngaia Stream

The Whangamōmona River is a river of the Manawatū-Whanganui region of New Zealand's North Island. It flows generally southeast from its sources near Whangamōmona before turning east to reach the Whanganui River.

In July 2020, the name of the river was officially gazetted as Whangamōmona River by the New Zealand Geographic Board.

== See also ==
- List of rivers of New Zealand
