= Huiakama =

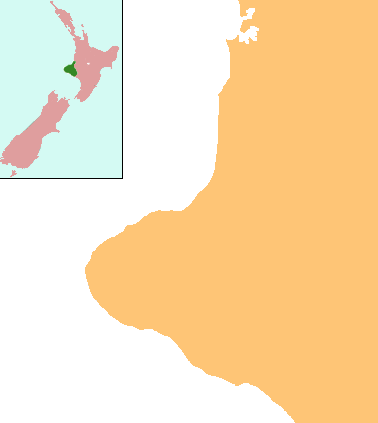
- Coordinates: 39°15′44″S 174°34′5″E
- Country: New Zealand
- Region: Taranaki
- District: Stratford District

Huiakama is a settlement in inland Taranaki, in the western North Island of New Zealand. It is located just to the north of Strathmore on State Highway 43.

== Education ==
Huiakama School is a coeducational full primary (years 1–8) school with a decile rating of 6 and a roll of 12(as at October 2025). The school was founded in 1896.

== Climate ==
Climate data for Te Wera Forest (1981–2010)
Month	Jan	Feb	Mar	Apr	May	Jun	Jul	Aug	Sep	Oct	Nov	Dec	Year
Mean daily maximum °C (°F)	22.0 (71.6)	22.4 (72.3)	20.8 (69.4)	18.1 (64.6)	15.2 (59.4)	13.0 (55.4)	12.3 (54.1)	13.1 (55.6)	14.8 (58.6)	16.3 (61.3)	18.0 (64.4)	20.2 (68.4)	17.2 (62.9)
Daily mean °C (°F)	16.4 (61.5)	16.6 (61.9)	14.9 (58.8)	12.3 (54.1)	10.1 (50.2)	8.2 (46.8)	7.3 (45.1)	8.2 (46.8)	9.8 (49.6)	11.5 (52.7)	13.1 (55.6)	15.1 (59.2)	12.0 (53.5)
Mean daily minimum °C (°F)	10.8 (51.4)	10.8 (51.4)	9.1 (48.4)	6.6 (43.9)	4.9 (40.8)	3.4 (38.1)	2.4 (36.3)	3.2 (37.8)	4.9 (40.8)	6.6 (43.9)	8.1 (46.6)	10.0 (50.0)	6.7 (44.1)
Average rainfall mm (inches)	150.4 (5.92)	94.5 (3.72)	130.5 (5.14)	131.2 (5.17)	164.2 (6.46)	167.0 (6.57)	180.2 (7.09)	153.7 (6.05)	163.6 (6.44)	151.5 (5.96)	129.3 (5.09)	161.0 (6.34)	1,777.1 (69.95)
Source: NIWA (rain 1971–2000)
