= Pembroke, New Zealand =

Settlement in Taranaki Region, New Zealand

Pembroke
- Interactive map of Pembroke
- Coordinates: 39°19′24″S 174°13′44″E
- Country: New Zealand
- Region: Taranaki Region
- Territorial authority: Stratford District
- Ward: Stratford Rural General Ward; Stratford Māori Ward
- Electorates: Taranaki-King Country; Whanganui; Te Tai Hauāuru (Māori)

Government
  - Territorial Authority: Stratford District Council
  - Regional council: Taranaki Regional Council
  - Mayor of Stratford: Neil Volzke
  - Taranaki-King Country MP and Whanganui MP: Barbara Kuriger and Carl Bates
  - Te Tai Hauāuru MP: Debbie Ngarewa-Packer

Pembroke is a settlement in inland Taranaki, in the western North Island of New Zealand. It is located about 5 km northwest of Stratford.

== Demographics ==
Pembroke locality covers 20.55 km^{2} (7.93 sq mi). The locality is part of the Pembroke statistical area.

Historical population for the locality
Year	Pop.	±% p.a.
2006	294	—
2013	354	+2.69%
2018	366	+0.67%
2023	459	+4.63%

Pembroke had a population of 459 in the 2023 New Zealand census, an increase of 93 people (25.4%) since the 2018 census, and an increase of 105 people (29.7%) since the 2013 census. There were 228 males, 231 females, and 6 people of other genders in 177 dwellings. 2.0% of people identified as LGBTIQ+. There were 72 people (15.7%) aged under 15 years, 81 (17.6%) aged 15 to 29, 240 (52.3%) aged 30 to 64, and 69 (15.0%) aged 65 or older.

People could identify as more than one ethnicity. The results were 96.7% European (Pākehā); 11.8% Māori; 0.7% Pasifika; 2.6% Asian; 0.7% Middle Eastern, Latin American and African New Zealanders (MELAA); and 3.9% other, which includes people giving their ethnicity as "New Zealander". English was spoken by 98.0%, Māori by 2.0%, and other languages by 3.9%. No language could be spoken by 2.6% (e.g. too young to talk). New Zealand Sign Language was known by 1.3%. The percentage of people born overseas was 11.1, compared with 28.8% nationally.

Religious affiliations were 32.7% Christian, and 0.7% Hindu. People who answered that they had no religion were 54.2%, and 11.8% of people did not answer the census question.

Of those at least 15 years old, 60 (15.5%) people had a bachelor's or higher degree, 240 (62.0%) had a post-high school certificate or diploma, and 84 (21.7%) people exclusively held high school qualifications. 45 people (11.6%) earned over $100,000 compared to 12.1% nationally. The employment status of those at least 15 was 222 (57.4%) full-time, 66 (17.1%) part-time, and 3 (0.8%) unemployed.

=== Pembroke statistical area ===
Pembroke statistical area, which also includes Midhirst and Cardiff, covers 226.41 km^{2} (87.42 sq mi) and had an estimated population of 1,810 as of June 2025, with a population density of 8.0 people per km^{2}.

Historical population for the statistical area
Year	Pop.	±% p.a.
2006	1,425	—
2013	1,461	+0.36%
2018	1,542	+1.09%
2023	1,701	+1.98%

Pembroke had a population of 1,701 in the 2023 New Zealand census, an increase of 159 people (10.3%) since the 2018 census, and an increase of 240 people (16.4%) since the 2013 census. There were 855 males, 837 females, and 9 people of other genders in 639 dwellings. 2.5% of people identified as LGBTIQ+. The median age was 39.8 years (compared with 38.1 years nationally). There were 360 people (21.2%) aged under 15 years, 276 (16.2%) aged 15 to 29, 846 (49.7%) aged 30 to 64, and 219 (12.9%) aged 65 or older.

People could identify as more than one ethnicity. The results were 93.7% European (Pākehā); 12.3% Māori; 1.1% Pasifika; 1.9% Asian; 0.5% Middle Eastern, Latin American and African New Zealanders (MELAA); and 3.9% other, which includes people giving their ethnicity as "New Zealander". English was spoken by 97.2%, Māori by 2.6%, and other languages by 4.6%. No language could be spoken by 2.8% (e.g. too young to talk). New Zealand Sign Language was known by 0.7%. The percentage of people born overseas was 10.1, compared with 28.8% nationally.

Religious affiliations were 30.3% Christian, 0.7% Hindu, 0.2% Māori religious beliefs, 0.2% Buddhist, 0.7% New Age, and 0.5% other religions. People who answered that they had no religion were 57.1%, and 10.2% of people did not answer the census question.

Of those at least 15 years old, 159 (11.9%) people had a bachelor's or higher degree, 840 (62.6%) had a post-high school certificate or diploma, and 339 (25.3%) people exclusively held high school qualifications. The median income was $43,900, compared with $41,500 nationally. 123 people (9.2%) earned over $100,000 compared to 12.1% nationally. The employment status of those at least 15 was 762 (56.8%) full-time, 213 (15.9%) part-time, and 24 (1.8%) unemployed.

== Education ==
Pembroke School is a coeducational full primary (years 1–8) school with a roll of 91 students as of July 2025. The school opened in 1893.
