= Whangamōmona =

Settlement in Manawatū-Whanganui Region, New Zealand

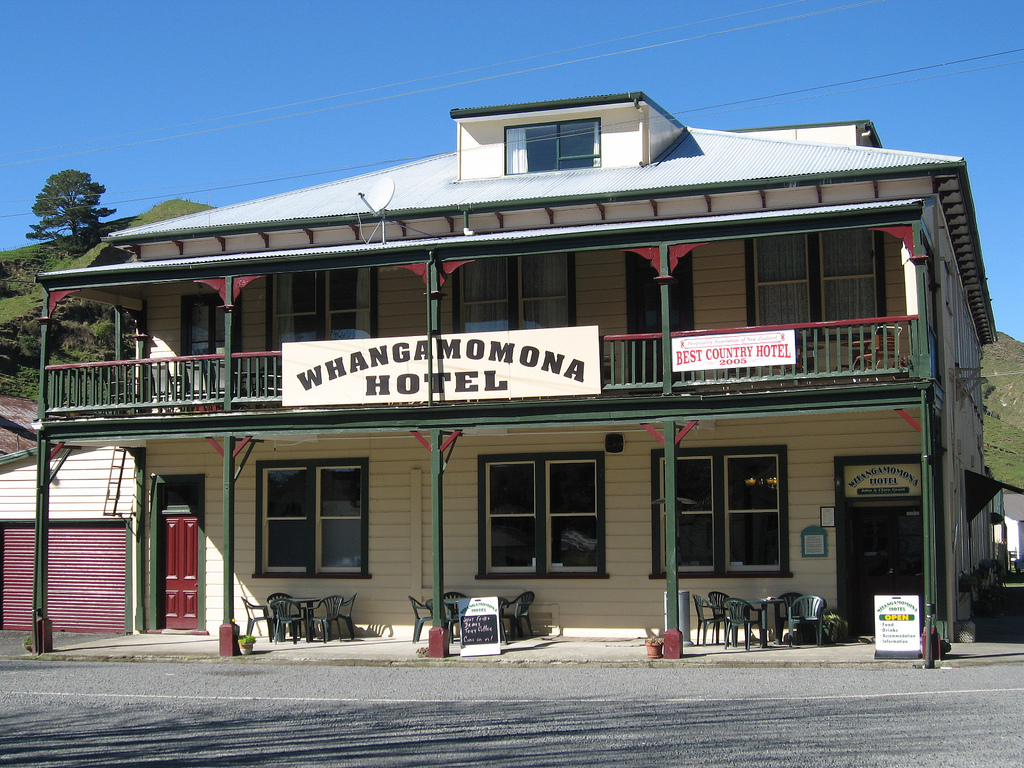
- Whangamomona Hotel

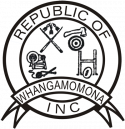
- Seal
- Interactive map of Whangamōmona
- Coordinates: 39°08′41″S 174°44′09″E
- Country: New Zealand
- Region: Manawatū–Whanganui region
- Territorial authority: Stratford District
- Ward: Stratford Rural General Ward; Stratford Māori Ward
- Electorates: Taranaki-King Country; Te Tai Hauāuru (Māori)

Government
  - Territorial Authority: Stratford District Council
  - Regional council: Horizons Regional Council
  - Mayor of Stratford: Neil Volzke
  - Taranaki-King Country MP: Barbara Kuriger
  - Te Tai Hauāuru MP: Debbie Ngarewa-Packer

Whangamōmona is a township in the Stratford District and Manawatū–Whanganui Region of New Zealand. It lies on State Highway 43, the "Forgotten World Highway", 65 kilometres (40 mi) north-east of Stratford and 55 kilometres (34 mi) south-west of Ōhura. By rail it is 61 kilometres (38 mi) from Stratford on the Stratford-Okahukura railway line.

== Demographics ==
Whangamōmona statistical area covers 689.60 km^{2} (266.26 sq mi) and had an estimated population of 170 as of June 2025, with a population density of 0.25 people per km^{2}.

Historical population
Year	Pop.	±% p.a.
2006	168	—
2013	150	−1.61%
2018	126	−3.43%
2023	159	+4.76%

Whangamōmona had a population of 159 in the 2023 New Zealand census, an increase of 33 people (26.2%) since the 2018 census, and an increase of 9 people (6.0%) since the 2013 census. There were 90 males and 69 females in 66 dwellings. 1.9% of people identified as LGBTIQ+. The median age was 44.4 years (compared with 38.1 years nationally). There were 33 people (20.8%) aged under 15 years, 18 (11.3%) aged 15 to 29, 75 (47.2%) aged 30 to 64, and 33 (20.8%) aged 65 or older.

People could identify as more than one ethnicity. The results were 92.5% European (Pākehā), 20.8% Māori, 5.7% Asian, and 5.7% other, which includes people giving their ethnicity as "New Zealander". English was spoken by 98.1%, and Māori by 3.8%. The percentage of people born overseas was 11.3, compared with 28.8% nationally.

Religious affiliations were 26.4% Christian, and 1.9% other religions. People who answered that they had no religion were 60.4%, and 9.4% of people did not answer the census question.

Of those at least 15 years old, 12 (9.5%) people had a bachelor's or higher degree, 75 (59.5%) had a post-high school certificate or diploma, and 42 (33.3%) people exclusively held high school qualifications. The median income was $22,700, compared with $41,500 nationally. 6 people (4.8%) earned over $100,000 compared to 12.1% nationally. The employment status of those at least 15 was 60 (47.6%) full-time, 15 (11.9%) part-time, and 12 (9.5%) unemployed.

== History ==
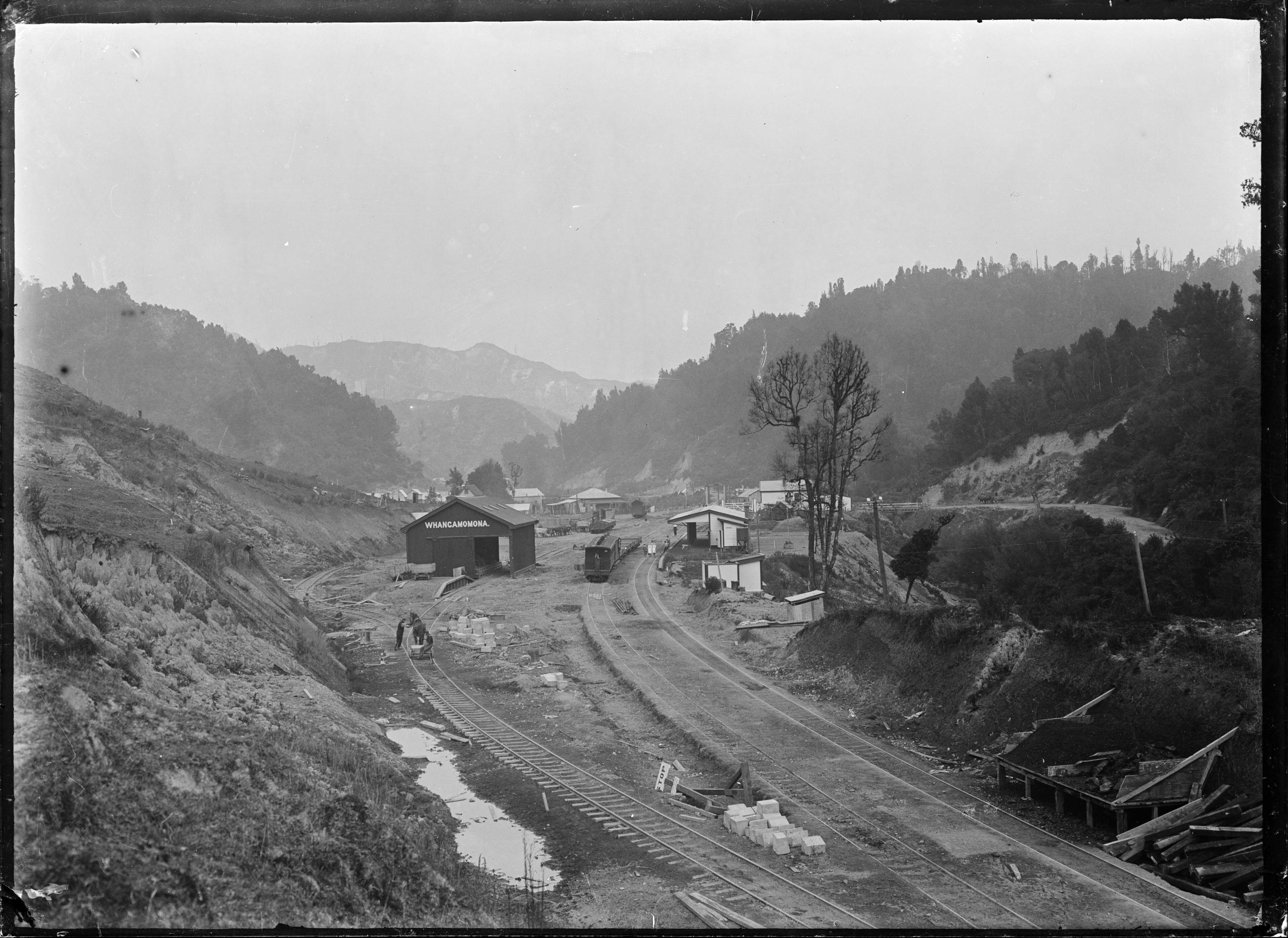
Whangamomona Railway Station circa 1916

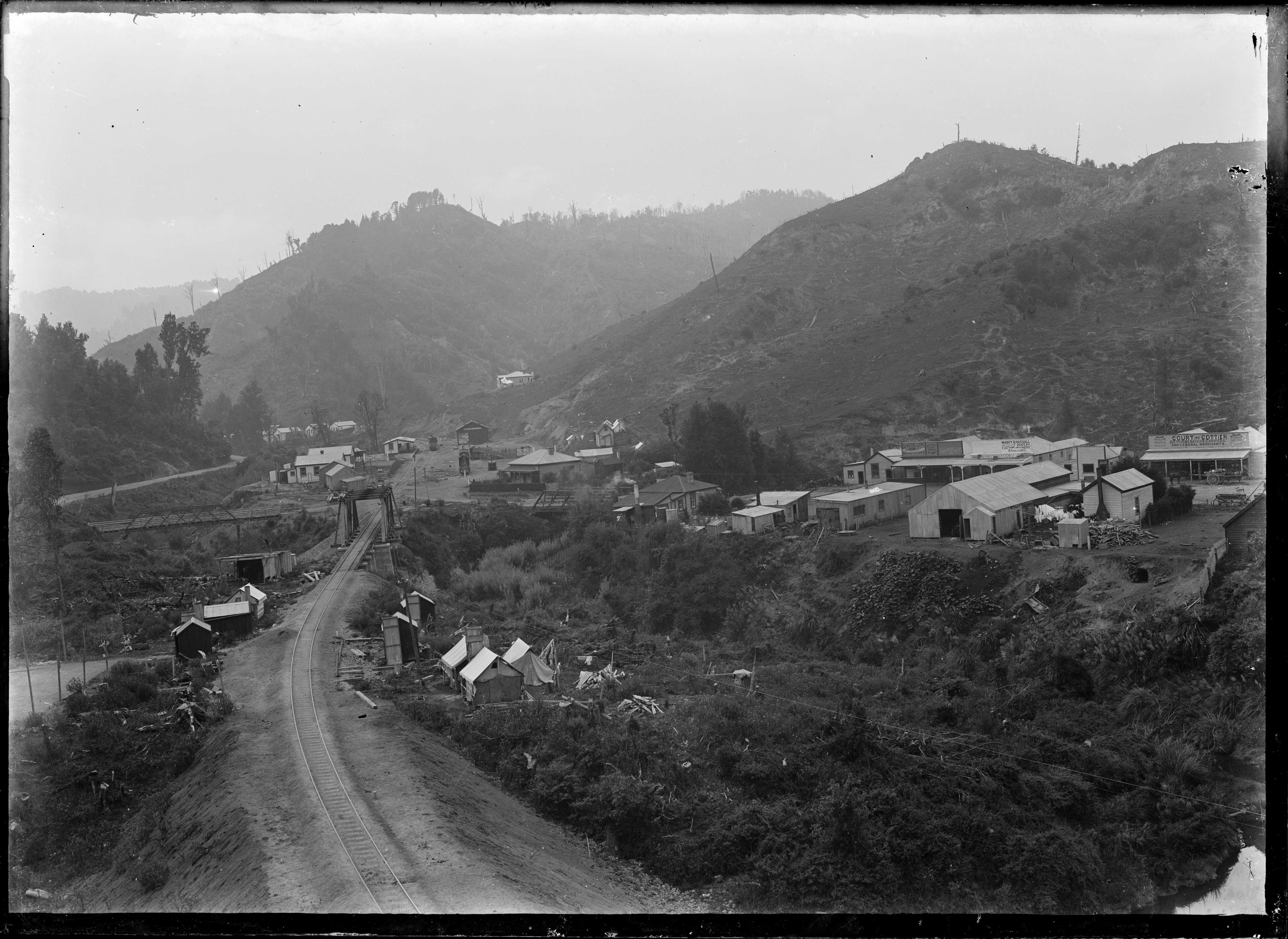
Panorama overlooking Whangamomona circa 1916

The first European settlers arrived in 1895, with the town proper established two years later. Growth of the town was seriously affected by the deaths of 51 men (including some from the smaller nearby settlements of Kohuratahi and Tahora) in the First World War and a major flood in 1924. The town recovered with arrival of the railway line in 1933 and electrification in 1959, but its population declined in subsequent decades. The school closed in 1979, followed nine years later by the post office.

In July 2020, the name of the locality was officially gazetted as Whangamōmona by the New Zealand Geographic Board.

== Republic Day ==
As part of the 1989 local government reforms Whangamomona was included in the Manawatu-Wanganui Region since the Whangamōmona River is a tributary of the Whanganui River. Residents objected, as they preferred to become part of the Taranaki Region, and on 1 November 1989, they responded by declaring themselves the "Republic of Whangamomona" at the first Republic Day. Though the move began as a pointed protest, the town continued to hold a celebratory Republic Day once a year, during which a vote for president was held. The day has become a local festival day, and attracts visitors from throughout the North Island. In 2001, the celebration became biennial, held in January to take advantage of the summer weather.
