= Matemateāonga Range =

Mountain range in New Zealand

Coordinates: 39°26′S 174°31′E

The Matemateāonga Range is a range of rugged hills in the northern Manawatū-Whanganui region of the western North Island of New Zealand. It is located east of Stratford on the western side the Whanganui River between Wanganui and Taumarunui.

In 2025 Mount Humphries in the Matemateōnga Range was renamed Whakaihuwaka Maunga.

== The 1970s proposed Cape Egmont to East Cape walkway ==
Starting in the late 1970s the then Department of Survey and Land Information embarked on a project to link Cape Egmont to East Cape by a walkway.

The Matemateāonga Range section of the ‘Cape Egmont to East Cape’ walkway was completed in the 1970s. The Matemateāonga Range section still remains in use. It was a traditional Māori trail, then dray track in the early 20th century.
