= Toko, New Zealand =

Settlement in Taranaki Region, New Zealand

Toko
- Interactive map of Toko
- Coordinates: 39°20′S 174°24′E
- Country: New Zealand
- Region: Taranaki Region
- Territorial authority: Stratford District
- Ward: Stratford Rural General Ward; Stratford Māori Ward
- Electorates: Taranaki-King Country; Whanganui; Te Tai Hauāuru (Māori)

Government
  - Territorial Authority: Stratford District Council
  - Regional council: Taranaki Regional Council
  - Mayor of Stratford: Neil Volzke
  - Taranaki-King Country MP and Whanganui MP: Barbara Kuriger and Carl Bates
  - Te Tai Hauāuru MP: Debbie Ngarewa-Packer

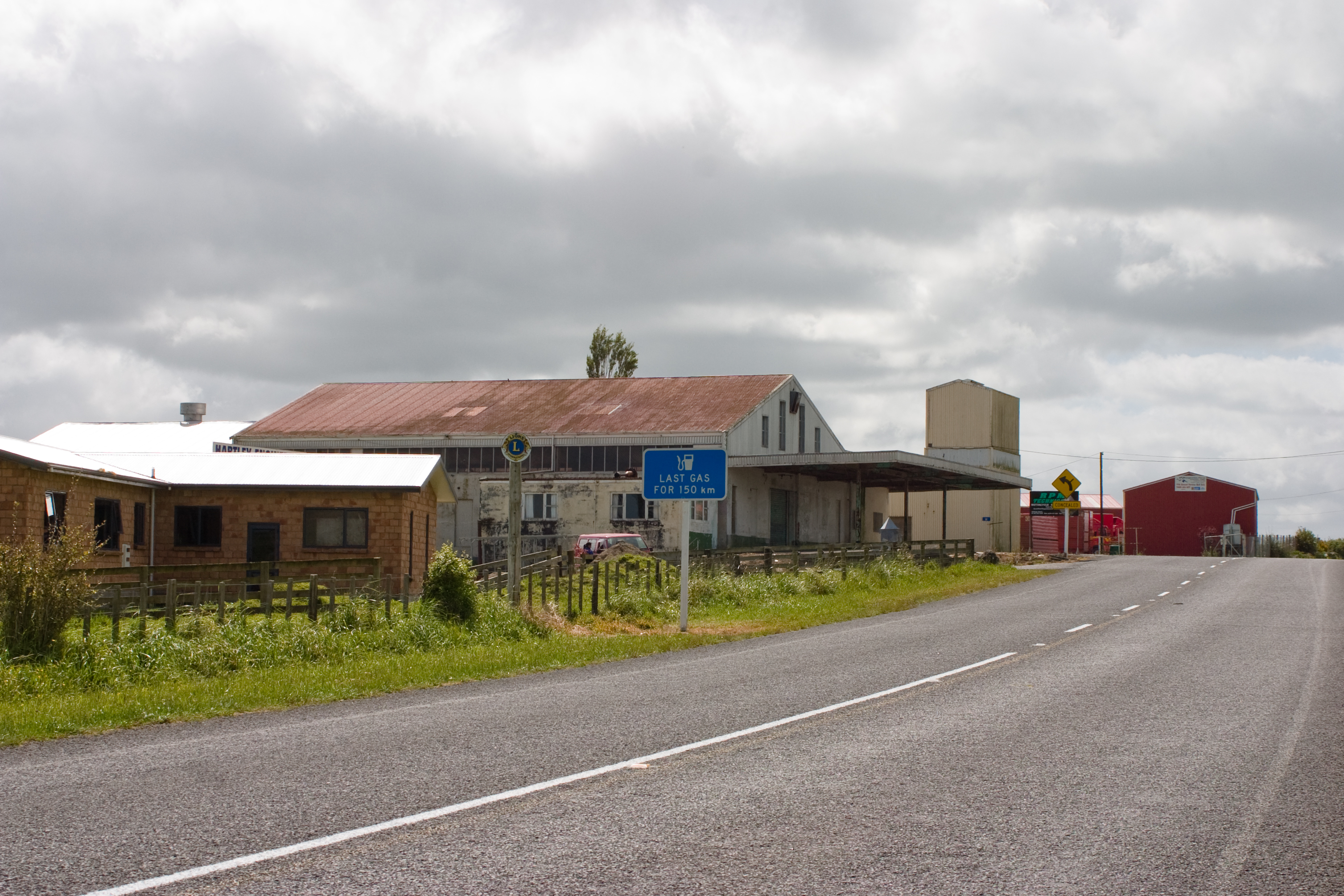
Last gas for 150km

Toko is a small rural settlement 10 kilometres east of Stratford, New Zealand, at the intersection of East Road (State Highway 43) and Toko Road. It is located on a railway, the Stratford–Okahukura Line, the western portion of which was operated as a branch line known as the Toko Branch prior to the line's completion. The Toko Stream flows through the area to join the Pātea River.

== Geography ==
Toko is surrounded by extremely fertile land, being located on the periphery of the Taranaki ringplain and adjacent to the Pātea River. The area is drained by the Toko Stream, and its tributaries the Manawaiwiri and Waiwiri Streams. Once covered in wetlands, since settlement the area has been drained to take advantage of the fertile soils. Dairy farming predominates the surrounding land use, with some sheep and beef farming in the steeper hill country.

== History ==
Toko was established in the 1890s, and served as an important centre for the developing hinterland. The settlement took on the nature of a village, containing a railway station, a dairy factory, a church, a hall, a hotel, a sawmill, a trucking depot, a playcentre, a sports facility, and a number of other businesses and numerous dwellings. Toko School was established in 1893, and located on a site approximately 2 km east of Toko at the intersection of East Road and Wawiri Road.

Like other rural centres, Toko went into decline in the latter part of the 20th century. The railway station, dairy factory and sawmill all closed. However the factory buildings are now used for an engineering business, and the church, hall, domain, hotel, trucking depot, and an automotive workshop are still being used for business and social activities.

== Demographics ==
Toko statistical area covers 228.05 km^{2} (88.05 sq mi) and had an estimated population of 1,390 as of June 2025, with a population density of 6.1 people per km^{2}.

Historical population
Year	Pop.	±% p.a.
2006	1,263	—
2013	1,242	−0.24%
2018	1,251	+0.14%
2023	1,293	+0.66%
The 2006 population is for a larger area of 228.45 km^{2}. Source:

Toko statistical area had a population of 1,293 in the 2023 New Zealand census, an increase of 42 people (3.4%) since the 2018 census, and an increase of 51 people (4.1%) since the 2013 census. There were 660 males, 633 females, and 3 people of other genders in 492 dwellings. 1.4% of people identified as LGBTIQ+. The median age was 39.6 years (compared with 38.1 years nationally). There were 276 people (21.3%) aged under 15 years, 204 (15.8%) aged 15 to 29, 636 (49.2%) aged 30 to 64, and 177 (13.7%) aged 65 or older.

People could identify as more than one ethnicity. The results were 95.4% European (Pākehā); 10.4% Māori; 1.2% Pasifika; 1.6% Asian; 0.5% Middle Eastern, Latin American and African New Zealanders (MELAA); and 1.9% other, which includes people giving their ethnicity as "New Zealander". English was spoken by 98.4%, Māori by 0.7%, and other languages by 3.2%. No language could be spoken by 1.6% (e.g. too young to talk). New Zealand Sign Language was known by 0.5%. The percentage of people born overseas was 7.4, compared with 28.8% nationally.

Religious affiliations were 30.6% Christian, 0.5% New Age, and 0.7% other religions. People who answered that they had no religion were 58.9%, and 9.5% of people did not answer the census question.

Of those at least 15 years old, 117 (11.5%) people had a bachelor's or higher degree, 648 (63.7%) had a post-high school certificate or diploma, and 246 (24.2%) people exclusively held high school qualifications. The median income was $44,400, compared with $41,500 nationally. 96 people (9.4%) earned over $100,000 compared to 12.1% nationally. The employment status of those at least 15 was 618 (60.8%) full-time, 156 (15.3%) part-time, and 21 (2.1%) unemployed.

== Born in Toko ==
- Jack Walter, All Black and Taranaki rugby football representative
- Toss Woollaston, New Zealand painter (1910–1998)
- Brian Smith, jazz musician (1939 - )
- William Bennett, New Zealand painter (1994 - )

== Other notable residents ==
- Sylvia Ashton-Warner, (as a child) New Zealand writer, poet and educator

== Education ==
Toko School is a coeducational full primary (years 1–8) school with a roll of 105 students as of March 2026. The school was founded in 1893. Other rural schools were merged into Toko School: Kota Road School in 1953, Huiroa School in 1991, Huinga School in 1992, Stanley School in 2002–2003, Douglas School in 2006 and Matau School in 2007.
