= State Highway 43 (New Zealand) =

Road in New Zealand

State Highway 43
- Forgotten World Highway
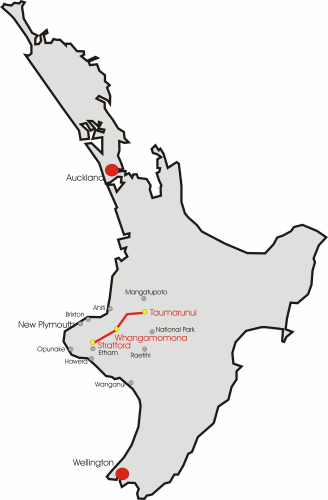

Route information
- Maintained by NZ Transport Agency Waka Kotahi
- Length: 148 km (92 mi)

Major junctions
- West end: SH 3 (Broadway) at Stratford
- East end: SH 4 (Hakiaha Street) at Taumarunui

Location
- Country: New Zealand
- Primary destinations: Whangamōmona, Ōhura

Highway system
- New Zealand state highways; Motorways and expressways; List
← SH 41	→ SH 44

New Zealand State Highway 43 (SH 43), also called the Forgotten World Highway, is a road that runs 148 km from Stratford in Taranaki to Taumarunui in the King Country. It contained the last unsealed portion of the New Zealand state highway network.

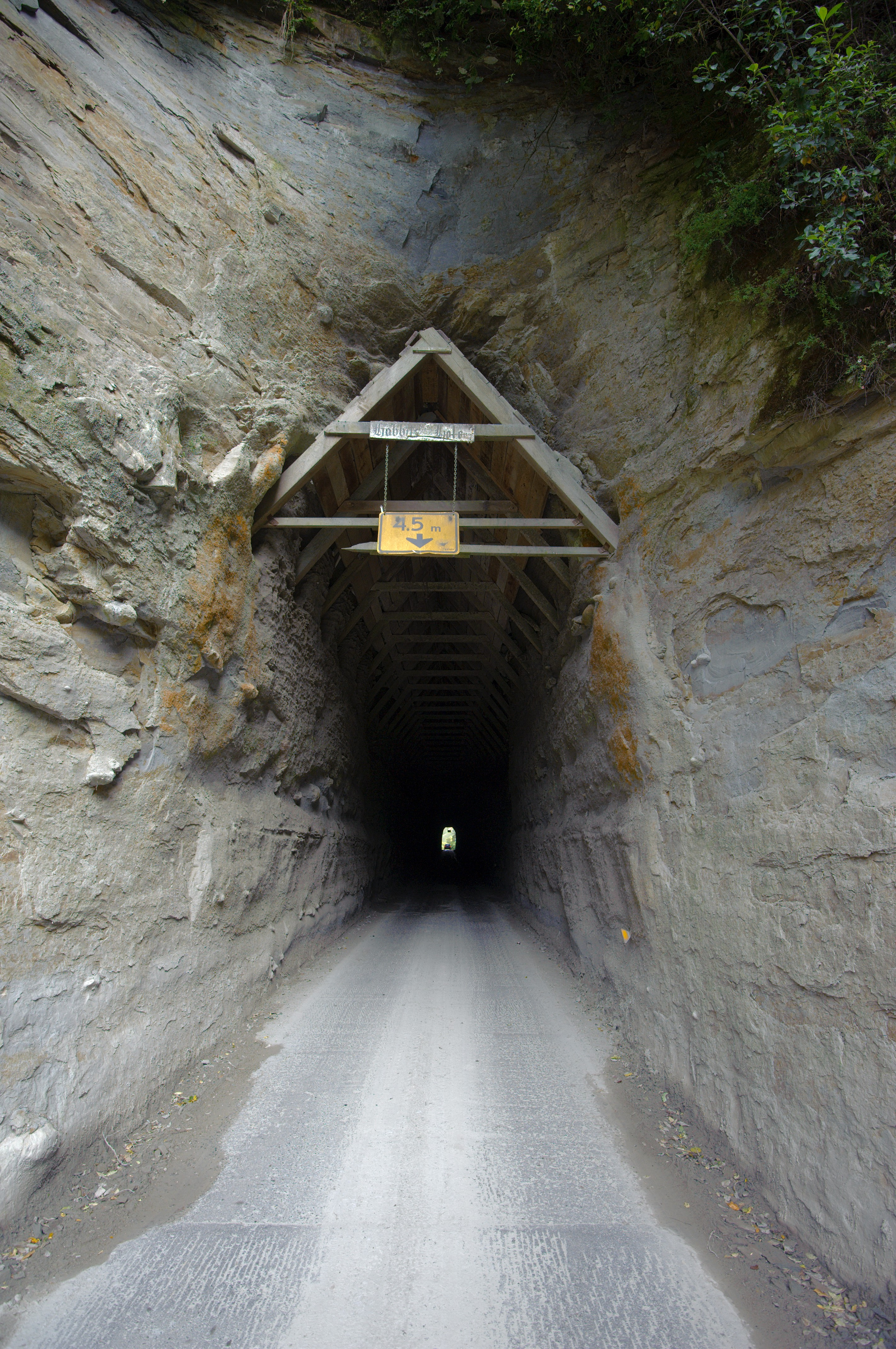
Moki Tunnel on SH43

== Route description ==
The road passes through small towns such as Toko, Douglas, Te Wera, Pohukura, Strathmore, Whangamōmona, Marco, Koruatahi, Tahora, Tatu, and 10 km off the highway is Ōhura. In the 1920s the Stratford–Okahukura Line was built. Many of the ghost towns are from the railway days.

Driving the highway takes up to 3 hours, as it passes through rugged countryside. It climbs three saddles: the Strathmore Saddle, Whangamōmona Saddle, and Tahora Saddle. 14 km past Whangamōmona is the Moki Tunnel, also known as Hobbit's Hole. Near one end of the Moki Tunnel is the turn off for the Mount Damper Falls, the fourth-highest in the North Island, and past the other end is the Tangarakau Gorge, with walls just under 60m high.

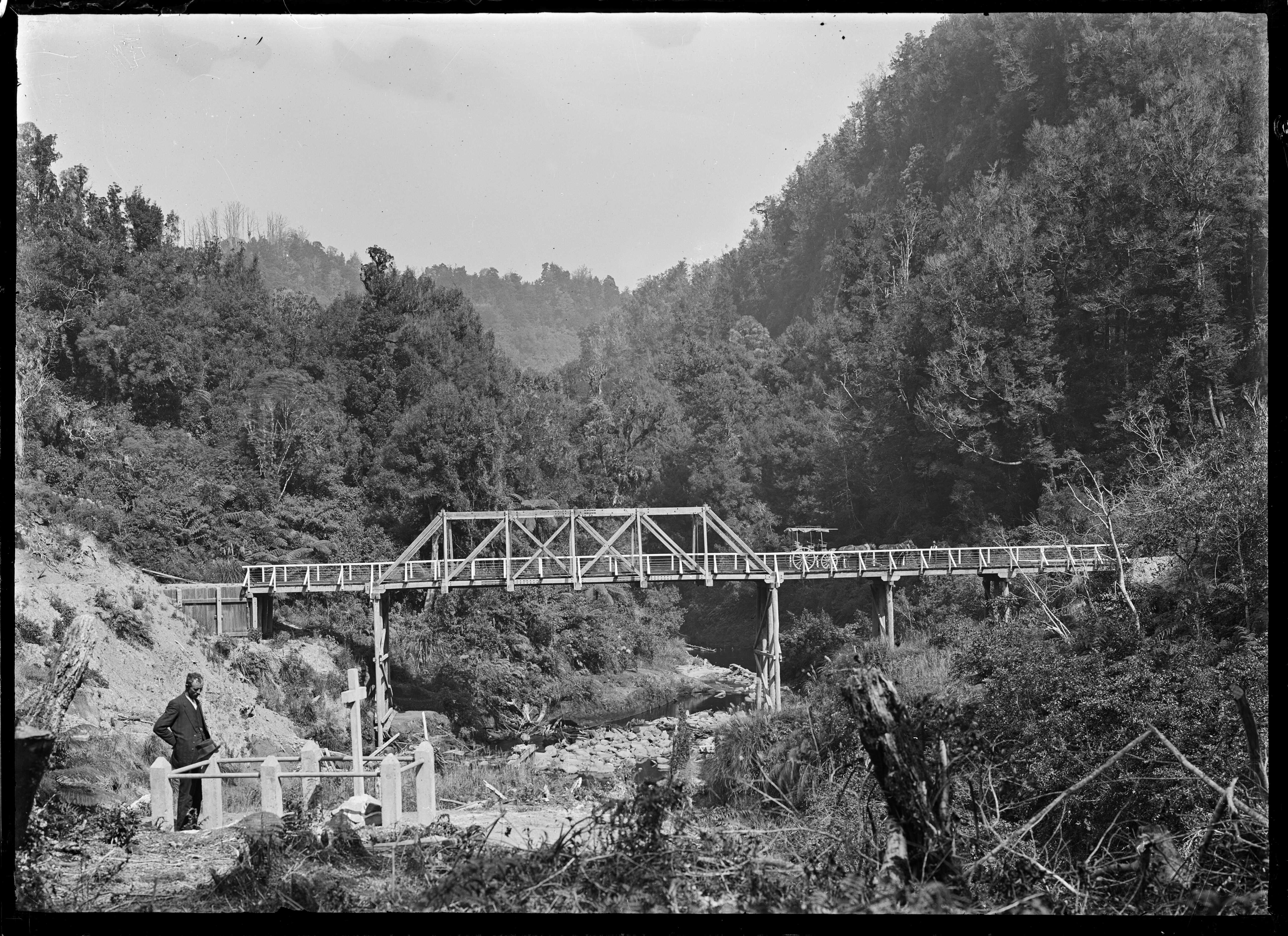
Road bridge through Tangarakau Gorge and gravesite for surveyor beneath it, circa.1916

12 km (7.5 mi) of the road through Tarangakau Gorge was unsealed for many years. This made SH 43 the only state highway that had an unsealed section. There is also an unsealed section in the middle of SH 38, but that portion is not designated a state highway. A 2017 report stated that sealing the Tangarakau Gorge road would cost approximately $7m. In December 2019, the government allocated funding to seal the final section of unsealed highway. The sealing work was completed in February 2025.

== Route changes ==
SH 43 used to end on SH 40 at Ōhura, before SH 40 was revoked in 1991 and SH 43 rerouted to Taumarunui via Aukopae along River Road.

== Dangers ==
SH 43 has been ranked as one of the 10 worst roads in New Zealand by the Police. The slippery gravel surface in the Tangarakau Gorge is the main cause of the highway's bad safety record. This section was scheduled to be sealed however, because of the increasing traffic volume and increased tourism interest. Some local residents have in the past, protested the condition of the unsealed road; in 2016 homemade signs proclaimed the road "closed". The entire length was finally sealed in early 2025, although the road is still very narrow in places.

== Culture ==
The road runs through the Republic of Whangamomona, a locality that declared itself a republic in 1989 after a revision in district boundaries forced it out of Taranaki.

== See also ==
- List of New Zealand state highways
