= Toko School =

Location
- State Highway 43, Stratford, Taranaki; 39.3244°S 174.4088°E

Information
- Type: State co-ed full primary (Years 1-8)
- Motto: Quality Learning for all in a Caring Community
- Established: 1893
- Ministry of Education Institution no.: 2254
- Principal: Kim Waite
- Enrolment: 102
- Socio-economic decile: 8
- Website: toko.school.nz

Toko School is a full co-educational primary school located in Stratford, New Zealand which was established in 1893. Toko School was opened in 1893 and was little more than a room above a milking shed. The school was soon properly established on its current site 2 kilometres past the township of Toko.

Toko School is a traditional country school, with a roll of approximately 100 children. At one time the school was a district high school. In its history it has twice burnt down and been rebuilt.

In 1953 Kota Road School amalgamated with Toko. In 1993 neighbouring Huinga School closed and the children started attending Toko. In 2006 neighbouring Douglas School also closed with fourteen children enrolling at Toko School. At the end of 2006 another Education Development Initiative occurred with the closure of Matau School and 2 additional children were enrolled.

Toko School is governed by a Board of Trustees, as with all New Zealand Schools. There are 5.8 teachers. The school is organised around six Learning Stars. These are: Partnership, Personal Best, Learning to Learn, Challenging Curriculum, Foundation Skills Learning Environment. Children are awarded Stars of Learning, which are collected are awarded at school assemblies. In classrooms an ongoing record is kept of these in the form of a classroom display.

The children are also members of one of four houses: Kauri, Rimu, Totara and kahikatea (These are all NZ native trees.) This system was introduced in 1997. Each year a shield is awarded to the winning house.

A photo highlighting the architecture of the school is available at the PukeAriki Museum in New Plymouth. It exemplifies a model of educational architecture of the 1930s and 1940s.

There is a strong emphasis on the development of oral language as the essential literacy. New Zealand Speech Board exams have been a part of the curriculum since 2003.

Since 2006 there have been talent initiatives with effort going into promoting children's own inherent abilities and strengths through talent and interest programs.

As part of a long-standing tradition, Toko School students are encouraged to raise and care for either a calf or lamb during Spring. An event known as "Calf and Lamb Day" is generally a morning event which takes place each year after Labour Day.

Another significant traditional event that occurs at Toko School is the annual Jones Cup. This has been held since 1932. It is a day of netball and rugby. The cup was presented by a member of the Jones family and is still awarded today. In 2006 and 2007 the "Jones Cup" was won by Toko School. In 2006 Ngaere School attended the Jones Cup for the first time. However, schools which amalgamated with Ngaere, including Bird Road and Pukengahu, were part of the "old" competition.

Although the school maintains strong traditional roots it is also proactive in looking to the future. The development of information communication technology is an important backbone of the schools curriculum. Late 2006 Toko Schools' IT infrastructure was upgraded, paid for primarily by the Ministry of Education.
