= Strathmore, New Zealand =

Strathmore
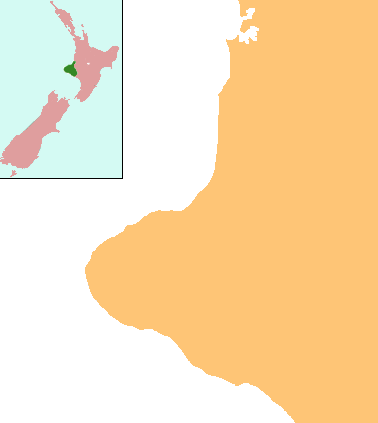
- Coordinates: 39°16′28″S 174°34′5″E
- Country: New Zealand
- Region: Taranaki
- District: Stratford District

Strathmore is a settlement in inland Taranaki, in the western North Island of New Zealand. It is located on State Highway 43, 25 kilometres (16 mi) east of Stratford.

== Climate ==
Climate data for Te Wera Forest (1981–2010)
Month	Jan	Feb	Mar	Apr	May	Jun	Jul	Aug	Sep	Oct	Nov	Dec	Year
Mean daily maximum °C (°F)	22.0 (71.6)	22.4 (72.3)	20.8 (69.4)	18.1 (64.6)	15.2 (59.4)	13.0 (55.4)	12.3 (54.1)	13.1 (55.6)	14.8 (58.6)	16.3 (61.3)	18.0 (64.4)	20.2 (68.4)	17.2 (62.9)
Daily mean °C (°F)	16.4 (61.5)	16.6 (61.9)	14.9 (58.8)	12.3 (54.1)	10.1 (50.2)	8.2 (46.8)	7.3 (45.1)	8.2 (46.8)	9.8 (49.6)	11.5 (52.7)	13.1 (55.6)	15.1 (59.2)	12.0 (53.5)
Mean daily minimum °C (°F)	10.8 (51.4)	10.8 (51.4)	9.1 (48.4)	6.6 (43.9)	4.9 (40.8)	3.4 (38.1)	2.4 (36.3)	3.2 (37.8)	4.9 (40.8)	6.6 (43.9)	8.1 (46.6)	10.0 (50.0)	6.7 (44.1)
Average rainfall mm (inches)	150.4 (5.92)	94.5 (3.72)	130.5 (5.14)	131.2 (5.17)	164.2 (6.46)	167.0 (6.57)	180.2 (7.09)	153.7 (6.05)	163.6 (6.44)	151.5 (5.96)	129.3 (5.09)	161.0 (6.34)	1,777.1 (69.95)
Source: NIWA
