= Stratford–Okahukura line =

Railway line in New Zealand

Stratford–Okahukura Line
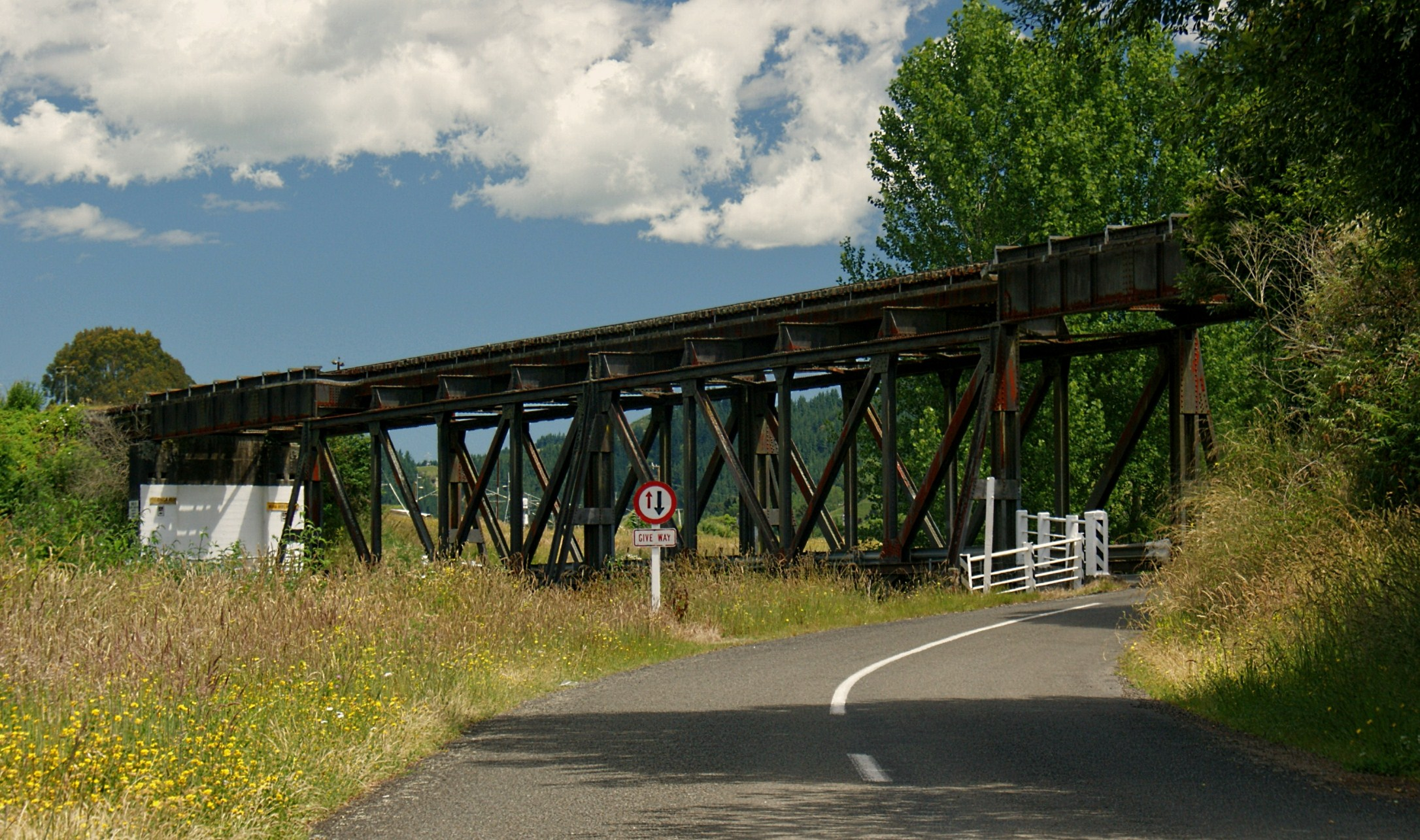
- Okahukura Road Rail Bridge

Overview
- Other name: Toko Branch
- Status: Mothballed
- Owner: Railways Department
- Locale: Taranaki and Manawatū–Whanganui, New Zealand
- Termini: Stratford; Okahukura
- Connecting lines: Marton–New Plymouth line North Island Main Trunk
- Stations: 23

Service
- Type: Heavy Rail
- System: New Zealand Government Railways (NZGR)
- Operator: Forgotten World Adventures

History
- Work began: 28 March 1901
- Opened: 12 December 1932 (freight); 3 September 1933 (passenger)
- Final scheduled passenger service: 21 January 1983
- Mothballed following derailment: 2 November 2009

Technical
- Line length: 143.49 km (89.16 mi)
- Num of tracks: Single
- Character: Rural, at-grade
- Track gauge: 3 ft 6 in (1,067 mm)

Map

The Stratford–Okahukura Line (SOL) is a 144 km (89 mi) secondary railway in New Zealand’s North Island, linking the Marton–New Plymouth line (MNPL) with the North Island Main Trunk (NIMT). Traversing steep and rugged terrain, the line features 24 tunnels, 91 bridges, and gradients as steep as 1 in 50 (2%). It once served 15 intermediate stations along its length.

Near Okahukura, the line crosses the Ongarue River via an unusual combined road-rail bridge, with a single-lane road deck situated beneath the railway track. Although the line is currently out of service, it is under a 30-year lease for a tourism-based venture. In July 2019, KiwiRail’s CEO named its reopening a priority, and in May 2021, Minister of Transport Michael Wood included the line in a 10-year government rail investment plan that outlined possible restoration.

== Construction ==
=== Original construction ===
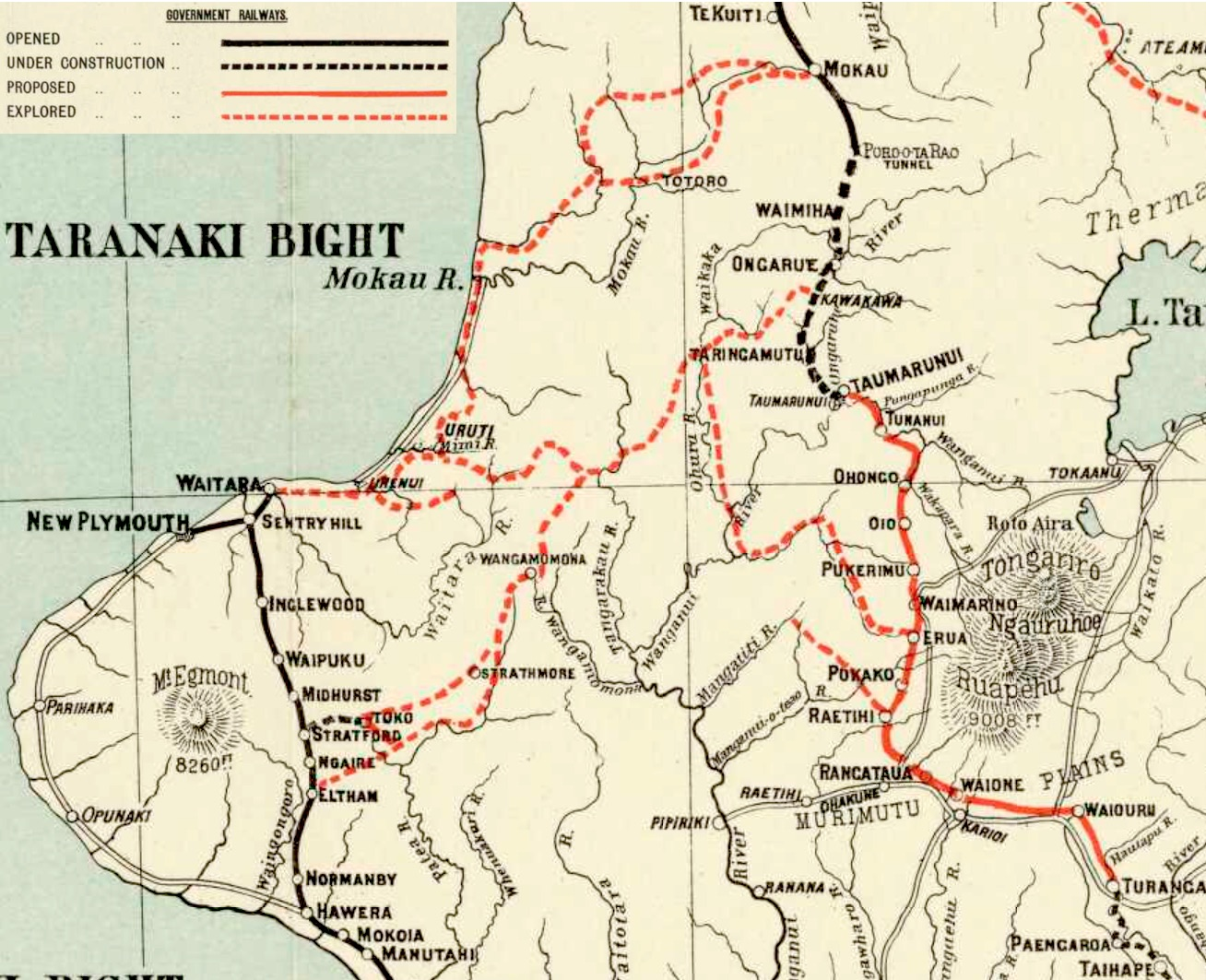
1901 map of proposed routes between Stratford and NIMT

The line from Stratford to Whangamōmona (of about 48 miles or 77 km) was authorised by the Railways Authorisation Act, 1900 The Hon William Hall-Jones turned the first sod of the Stratford-Okahukura Railway at Stratford on 28 March 1901.

Okahukura, south of Ongarue, was to be the junction point with the North Island Main Trunk Line. Construction took nearly 32 years, and the western part, from Stratford, was operated as the Toko Branch from 9 August 1902. The SOL was nearly complete before the onset of the Great Depression, so work was not halted, unlike on many public works projects such as the East Coast Main Trunk Railway beyond Taneatua.

The section from Okahukura to Matiere was officially opened on Tuesday 23 May 1922, although the bridges to the west of Tuhua were temporary rather than the final and stronger structures. At the opening ceremony, the Minister for Public Works, the Hon Gordon Coates (subsequently Prime Minister, 1925-1928) said the cost of building that segment of the line was £33,000 per mile. At the same time, a separate report indicates that the track had been laid from Stratford for 47 miles (76 km) up to Tahora, leaving a 31-mile (50 km) gap between Tahora and Matiere. Ōhura had passenger and goods trains run by PWD from 18 December 1926, when the Public Works Minister, K J Williams, officially opened the line from Okahukura.

The Mayor of Stratford celebrated the piercing of the last tunnel (52.5 chains or 3,460 ft or 1,060 m No.4 Mangatiti) on 2 August 1932 and, on 7 November 1932, the last spike was driven at Heao by the Prime Minister, the Right Hon. George Forbes, with Rt. Hon. Gordon Coates driving the first train. He said the line had cost £2.9m and had 265,000 sleepers. Goods traffic started on 12 December 1932, though the SOL was not handed over by the Public Works Department to the New Zealand Railways Department until 3 September 1933.

=== Signalling ===
The line was unsignalled and worked under "open section working" when two trains collided at the northern portal to the Whangamomona Tunnel on 21 December 1934; Train No 521 was due to cross with No 556 at Pohokura but departed without the guard as the engine crew claimed they saw his arm horizontal at the rear of the train indicating the train was to proceed; the crews were fortunate that they did not collide in the tunnel.

Although generally understood to have trains operating, especially in the later years, on a warrant control basis, mention is made in the 1939 Railways Report to Parliament of the completion of automatic single-line signalling on the line. The final section was from Whangamōmona to Okahukura, in those days a distance of 51 miles 52 chains (83.1 km) and consistent with modern distance measurements.In 1989 the line was converted to Track Warrant Control, or TWC. A Slip would be issued to the train crew permitting them permission over the line, as well as operating instructions. TWC started from the 12L signal Okahukura to just before the 6L signal Stratford

=== 1950s upgrades and maintenance ===
Upgrades and maintenance to the track were undertaken in 1959–60. Some of the track was replaced with 75 lbs/yd rail that at some point was made into a continuously welded rail. This work also involved a deviation at Stratford in conjunction with the shifting of that station to the southern edge of town (and the current station building being built).

=== Crossing loops ===
Crossing loops were established at Te Wera, Whangamōmona, Tangarakau, and Ōhura. Three stations (Te Wera, Whangamōmona, and Ōhura) had stationmasters. The short loops meant that long trains had to be split to fit into the loop and siding.

== Operation ==
=== Passenger services ===
The SOL was initially served by the New Plymouth Night Express between New Plymouth and Auckland and by Stratford–Taumarunui passenger trains. When the line opened, it was reported that overnight express trains between Auckland and New Plymouth could now complete the journey in less than 12 hours. On Sundays, Tuesdays and Thursdays trains left Auckland at 7pm, Taumarunui at 12.45am and reached New Plymouth at 6.1am. The trains returned on Mondays, Wednesdays and Fridays, leaving New Plymouth at 7.10pm, Stratford 8.31pm and arriving at Auckland at 7.6am. Whangamōmona had refreshment rooms from 1933 to 1965.

Fiat or "88 seater" railcars replaced the Auckland-New Plymouth express trains from 1956, but were cut back to New Plymouth-Taumarunui in 1971. Mixed trains were withdrawn in 1975.

Scheduled passenger trains ceased in January 1983 as roads in the rugged and isolated northern Taranaki were improved and passengers switched to cars, though the line was not closed to all passenger trains until January 2007, after an excursion to Whangamōmona's "Republic Day" celebrations. This terminated the operation of excursions, but efforts were made to have the line upgraded to a standard where excursions will again be possible. A working party of stakeholders was formed in June 2007 to investigate the current state of the line and to develop a case for upgrading it. Considerable maintenance was required to bring the line up to safety standards required for passenger trains at a cost of approximately NZ$6 million to complete, according to Stratford Mayor Brian Jeffares.

=== Freight services ===
Most freight was for the rural hinterland, but along the SOL there were coal mines near Ōhura and Tangarakau, and also sawmills. One freight train operated each weeknight each way along the line carrying freight between New Plymouth and Auckland, interchanging at Taumarunui. In the late 1990s and early 2000s deferred maintenance issues meant these services operated under heavy speed restrictions.

In conjunction with the Marton - New Plymouth Line the SOL also provided an alternative route when the North Island Main Trunk was closed between Marton and Taumarunui. In 1953 the Tangiwai disaster closed the NIMT for a period.

=== Mothballing ===
The SOL suffered from a lack of investment and maintenance, leading to a number of speed restrictions being put in place. In July 2002 a fatal derailment occurred at Te Wera, and a number of other incidents also plagued operations. In November 2009 a serious partial derailment of a wagon occurred, damaging some 8 km of line preventing use by trains without repairs. KiwiRail describes the damage as covering 9.5 km (5.9 mi) of track. Following this KiwiRail decided to mothball the 144 km (89 mi) line, with rail freight now being routed through Palmerston North. Ideas for preserving the line emerged, with hopes that customers and investment could be found to return the line to full service.

Adventure tourism operator Forgotten World Adventures reached an agreement with KiwiRail in 2012 to lease the line for their new venture using modified petrol rail carts for tourists to travel between the line's termini at Stratford and Okahukura, via a number of trip options, starting from Labour Weekend 2012. The 30-year lease makes the company responsible for the line's maintenance and access control but allows KiwiRail to use the line in emergencies and to resume control of the line depending on future circumstances and opportunities. The rail bridge over State Highway 4 at Okahukura has been removed making the track between the rail cart station and Okahukura unusable.

In 2019 the Rail & Maritime Transport Union revealed that a review of the line is being undertaken to assess the viability of reopening for "Fonterra and log traffic." In July KiwiRail CEO Greg Miller stated that a $40 million project to reopen the line was a priority. Minister of Transport Michael Wood announced the government's 10-year plan for rail investment on 6 May 2021. Some specific plans could include re-opening the Stratford to Okahukura line.

== See also ==
- Rail transport in New Zealand
