= Stratford District Council =

Local government in New Zealand

Coordinates: 39.3406555°S 174.2810989°E

Stratford District Council Te Kaunihera ā-Rohe o Whakaahurangi

Type
- Type: Unicameral of Stratford District, New Zealand
- Houses: Governing Body
- Term limits: None

History
- Founded: 6 March 1989

Leadership
- Mayor: Neil Volzke

Structure
- Seats: 11 seats (1 mayor, 10 ward seats)
- Length of term: 3 years

Website
- stratford.govt.nz

Stratford District Council (Māori: Te Kaunihera ā-Rohe o Whakaahurangi) is the territorial authority for the Stratford District of New Zealand.

The council consists of the mayor of Stratford, Neil Volzke, and ten ward councillors.

== Composition ==
=== Councillors ===
- Mayor: Neil Volzke
- Four Rural Ward councillors
- Six Urban Ward councillors
- One Māori Ward councillor

== History ==
The council was established in 1989, through the merger of the Stratford County Council (established in 1890) and the Stratford Borough Council (established in 1898).
