= Ahukawakawa Swamp =

Sphagnum bog in New Zealand

Coordinates: 39.25°S 174.05°E

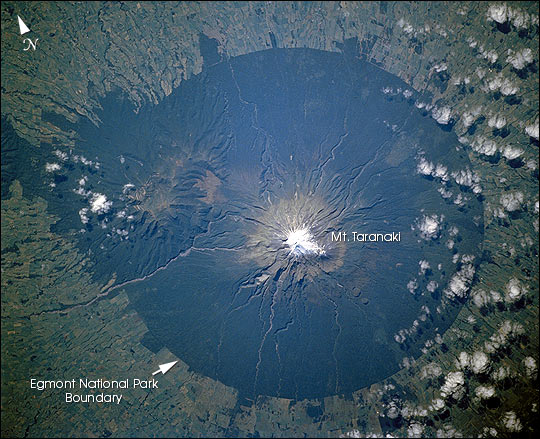
Mt Taranaki drainage system. Ahukawakawa Swamp is visible to the left of the summit of Mount Taranaki and the upper canyon of the Stony River can also be seen to the west.

The Ahukawakawa Swamp is an area of sphagnum bog in Egmont National Park in the Taranaki Region of New Zealand. It was formed approximately 3,500 years ago and is of particular interest to botanists. Over 260 species of higher plant have been recorded there. The area of the swamp is approximately 1 km^{2} (0.39 sq mi).

== Geomorphology ==
The swamp sits at an altitude of 920 metres (3,020 ft) and lies between the main cone of Mount Taranaki and the Pouakai Range to the northwest, which reaches 1,400 metres (4,600 ft). It was formed about 3,500 years ago when a lava extrusion and a later debris flow blocked the Stony River. This extrusion, which reaches 1,052 metres (3,451 ft), lies to the west of the swamp and is known as The Dome. The outlet from the swamp forms the 30-metre-high (98 ft) Bells Falls.

The area is still subject to geomorphological change. The Stony River was considered Taranaki's best trout fishery until severe erosion and land instability in the river's headwaters from 1997 onwards caused high sediment loads.

== Vegetation ==
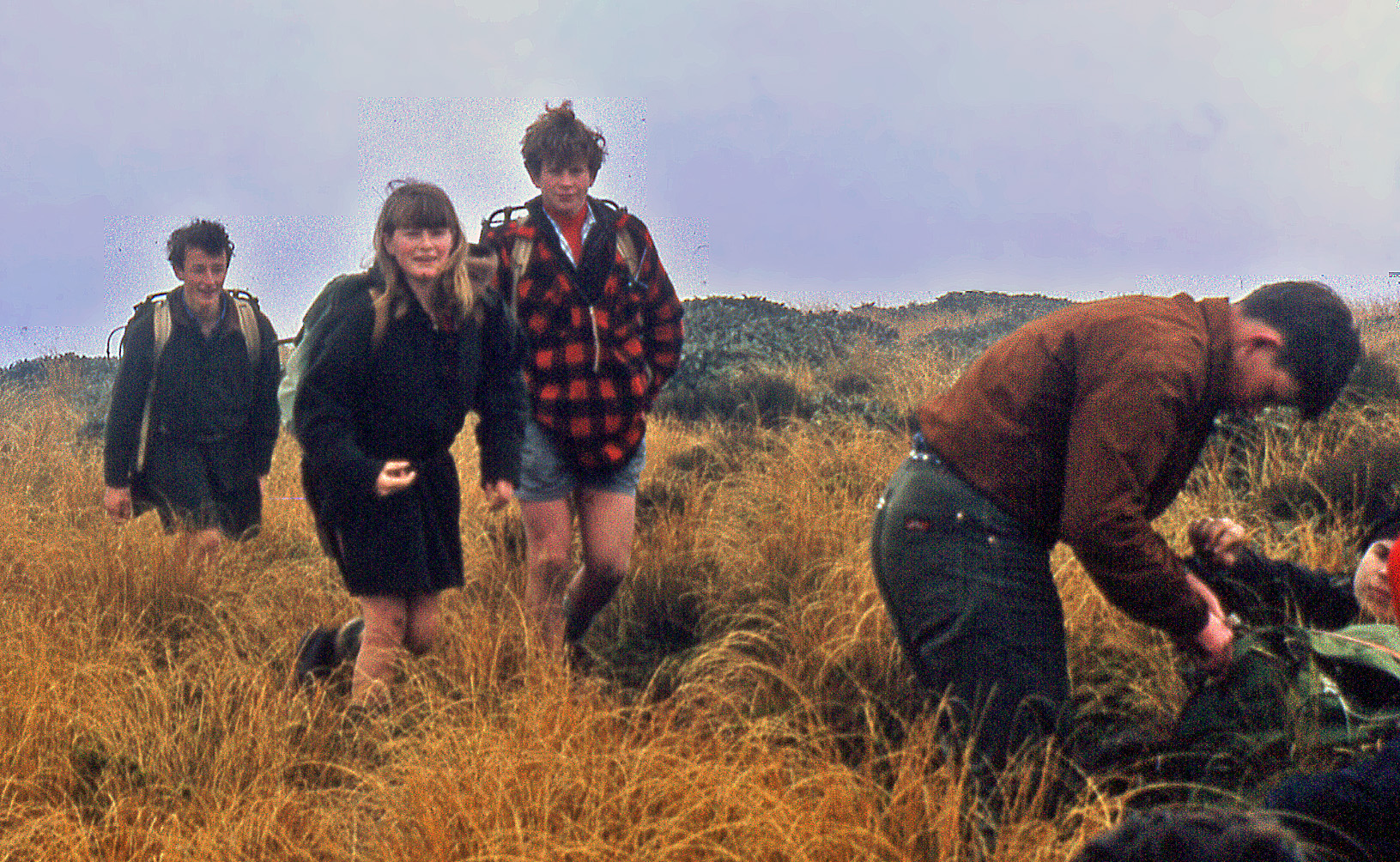
Red tussock grasses in the Pouakai Range

This alpine wetland is of interest to botanists because "its wide range of plants have adapted to acidic soils at very low temperatures." Sedges, herbs, grasses and mosses make up the ground cover on the floor of the wetland and the divaricating shrub Melicytus drucei is endemic to the area. The large red tussocks that form in the cool environment and medium fertility wet soils are a feature of the natural environment.

Over 260 species of higher plant have been recorded in the swamp and Margaret Bayfield identified several different assemblages within it. The southern margin comprises scrub and shrub/tussockland and is dominated by inaka (var. filifolium) although other shrubs such as Veronica odora and leatherwood are also common. In the "mire proper" red tussock is dominant and found along with various sedges including Carex coriacea and star sedge. There are abundant mosses, especially Dicranoloma robustum and sphagnum. Small bodies of open water towards the east end of the swamp contain the pond weed Potamogeton suboblongus and the New Zealand subspecies of the milfoil Myriophyllum pedunculatum.

== Tourism ==
The Pouakai Circuit, a 2–3 day 25 km tramp that has two overnight huts available, passes through "the unique Ahukawakawa Swamp" via a boardwalk.

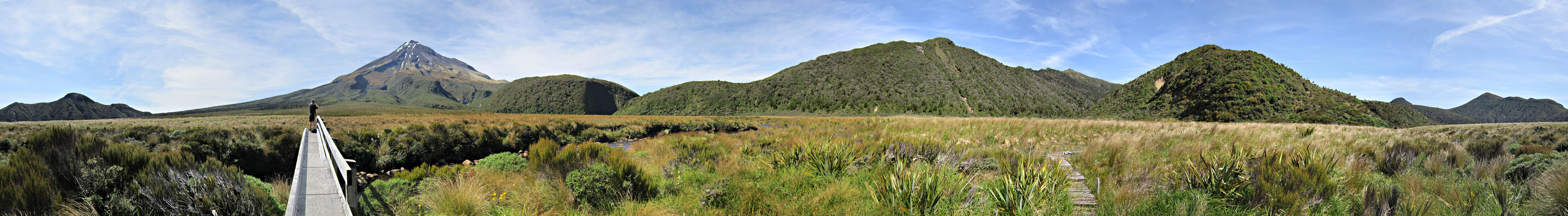
A 360° panorama of the Ahukawakawa Swamp photographed from where the Pouakai Circuit boardwalk footbridge crosses the Stony River

== See also ==
- Tussock grasslands of New Zealand
- Wetlands of New Zealand
