= Ōakura =

Settlement in Taranaki Region, New Zealand

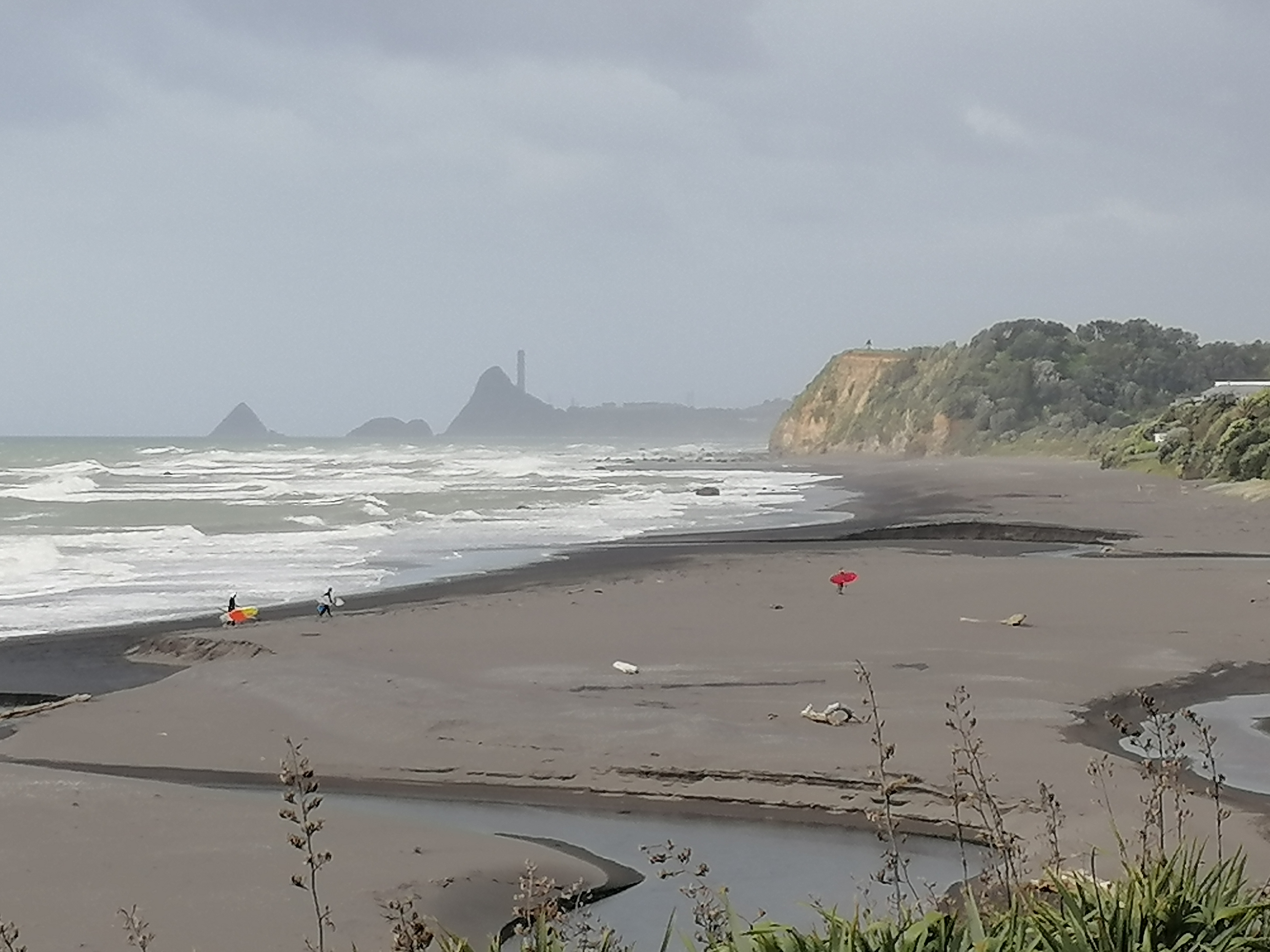
- A view of Ōakura Beach looking toward New Plymouth
- Interactive map of Ōakura
- Coordinates: 39°07′S 173°57′E
- Country: New Zealand
- Region: Taranaki Region
- Territorial authority: New Plymouth District
- Ward: Kaitake-Ngāmotu General Ward; Te Purutanga Mauri Pūmanawa Māori Ward
- Community: Kaitake Community
- Electorates: New Plymouth; Te Tai Hauāuru (Māori)

Government
  - Territorial Authority: New Plymouth District Council
  - Regional council: Taranaki Regional Council
  - Mayor of New Plymouth: Max Brough
  - New Plymouth MP: David MacLeod
  - Te Tai Hauāuru MP: Debbie Ngarewa-Packer

Area
  - Total: 1.68 km^{2} (0.65 sq mi)

Population (June 2025)
  - Total: 1,780
  - Density: 1,060/km^{2} (2,740/sq mi)
- Time zone: UTC+12 (NZST)
  - Summer (DST): UTC+13 (NZDT)
- Postcode(s): 4314
- Area code: 06

Ōakura is a small township in New Plymouth District, Taranaki, in the western North Island of New Zealand. It is located on State Highway 45, 15 kilometres south-west of New Plymouth. Ōkato is 12 km further south-west. The Oakura River flows past the town and into the North Taranaki Bight. To the south is the Kaitake Range, part of Egmont National Park.

The Oakura Messenger (TOM) was a monthly publication delivered to all letterboxes in the area. It began in October 2000. It was renamed the Ōākura Post in June 2020.

On 5 July 2007 the town was hit by a tornado, which damaged 60 houses.

Ōakura is well known for its beach—Ōakura Beach. In 2007 it became one of the first Blue Flag accredited beaches in Oceania. Only two others—Fitzroy and East End beach in nearby New Plymouth—received the same award that year. As of 2010, Ōakura Beach has retained its blue flag status.

== Demographics ==
Stats NZ describes Ōakura as a small urban area which covers 1.68 km^{2} (0.65 sq mi). It had an estimated population of 1,780 as of June 2025, with a population density of 1,060 people per km^{2}.

Historical population
Year	Pop.	±% p.a.
2006	1,377	—
2013	1,437	+0.61%
2018	1,539	+1.38%
2023	1,764	+2.77%

Ōakura had a population of 1,764 in the 2023 New Zealand census, an increase of 225 people (14.6%) since the 2018 census, and an increase of 327 people (22.8%) since the 2013 census. There were 855 males, 906 females, and 6 people of other genders in 621 dwellings. 2.4% of people identified as LGBTIQ+. The median age was 42.0 years (compared with 38.1 years nationally). There were 456 people (25.9%) aged under 15 years, 183 (10.4%) aged 15 to 29, 837 (47.4%) aged 30 to 64, and 288 (16.3%) aged 65 or older.

People could identify as more than one ethnicity. The results were 93.0% European (Pākehā); 12.6% Māori; 1.7% Pasifika; 2.0% Asian; 1.7% Middle Eastern, Latin American and African New Zealanders (MELAA); and 3.4% other, which includes people giving their ethnicity as "New Zealander". English was spoken by 98.1%, Māori by 4.3%, Samoan by 0.2%, and other languages by 9.4%. No language could be spoken by 1.5% (e.g. too young to talk). New Zealand Sign Language was known by 0.2%. The percentage of people born overseas was 24.7, compared with 28.8% nationally.

Religious affiliations were 28.4% Christian, 0.3% Hindu, 0.2% Māori religious beliefs, 0.3% Buddhist, 0.3% New Age, 0.5% Jewish, and 1.0% other religions. People who answered that they had no religion were 60.7%, and 8.0% of people did not answer the census question.

Of those at least 15 years old, 492 (37.6%) people had a bachelor's or higher degree, 615 (47.0%) had a post-high school certificate or diploma, and 198 (15.1%) people exclusively held high school qualifications. The median income was $47,200, compared with $41,500 nationally. 291 people (22.2%) earned over $100,000 compared to 12.1% nationally. The employment status of those at least 15 was 591 (45.2%) full-time, 300 (22.9%) part-time, and 24 (1.8%) unemployed.

== History ==
The Ōakura River (and therefore Ōakura township itself) was named after the female ancestor Akura-matapū of the Kurahaupō waka. Ōakura-matapu was the original name of the river, and it literally means "Belonging to Akura-matapū". Akura was married to Okorotua. Ngāti Tairi hapū holds mana whenua in Ōakura. Ngāti Tairi belongs to the larger descent group of Ngā Mahanga a Tairi. Ngāti Tairi and Ngā Māhanga a Tairi are a part of the tribe Taranaki. Ngāti Tairi retain their take ahi kā (rights of ownership) through the marae Ōakura Pā beside the southern side of the Ōakura River. People have been living in the area of Ōakura for hundreds of years.

When war broke out in 1860 during the First Taranaki War, Ngāti Tairi as part of Nga Mahanga and Taranaki joined in the offensives against the British. The nearby Tapuae ridge (north of Ōakura) was a continual site of conflict. In March and April 1863, Governor George Grey established redoubts around Ōakura just prior to the start of the Second Taranaki War, as locations where British troops could be stationed to keep European settlers in New Plymouth safe, and as a base to later retake Tataraimaka to the West. On 4 May 1863 a party of about 40 Māori warriors ambushed a small military party on a coastal road west of the town, killing nine of the 10 soldiers. The revenge attack on the military party, escorting a British defaulter to New Plymouth for trial, reignited hostilities in the Second Taranaki War.

== Amenities and services ==
South Road (better known as Surf Highway 45) is Ōakura's main street, and most local businesses and services are situated around here.

== Features and attractions ==
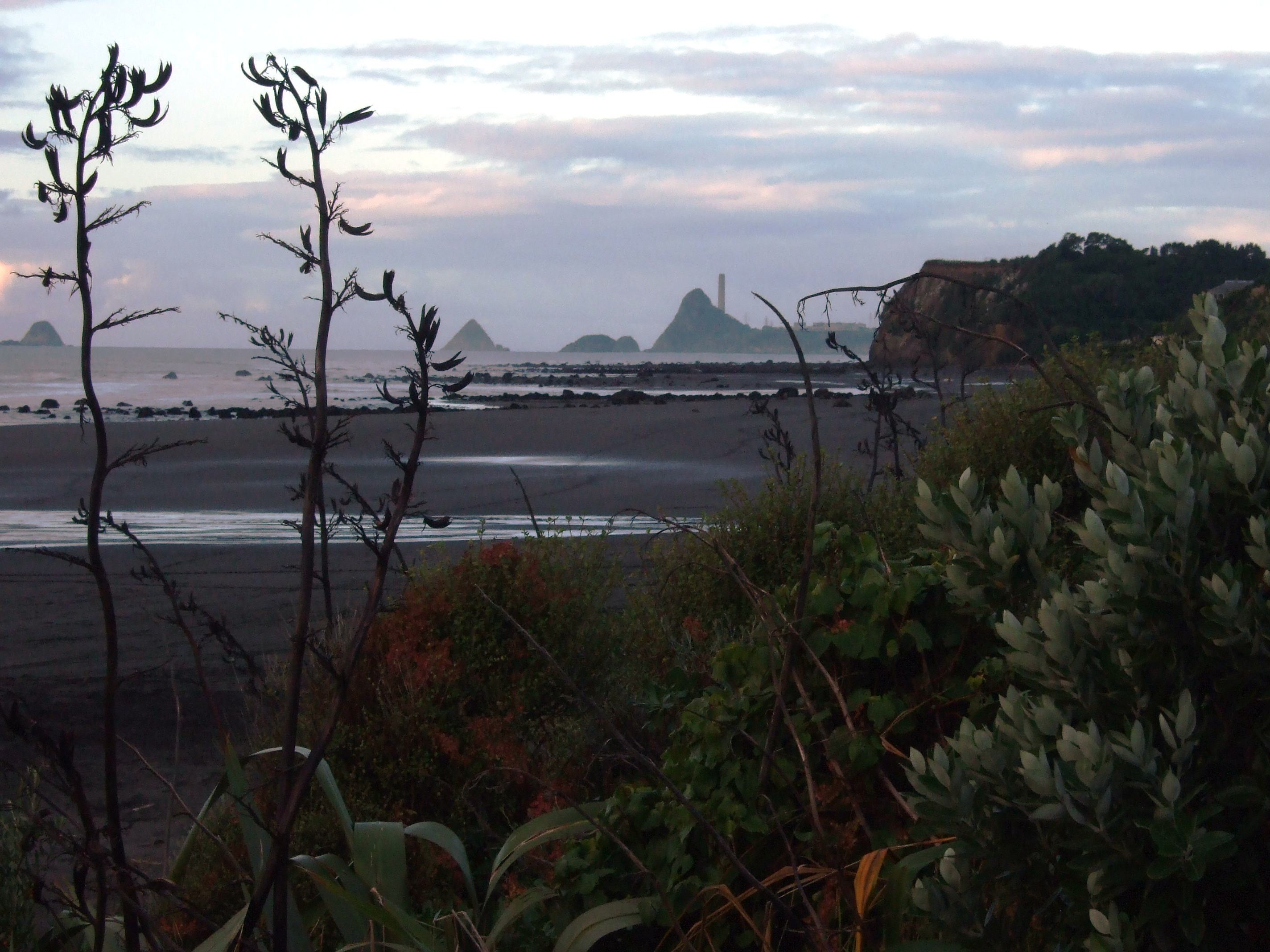
Ōakura Beach at dusk

In addition to its beach, Ōakura is home to Butlers Reef, a bar and music venue that has hosted performances by New Zealand and international artists including Dave Dobbyn, Trinity Roots, Gin Wigmore, Katchafire, Supergroove and Jimmy Barnes.

Other places of interest include the township's three parks – Matekai, Corbett and the Shearer Reserve. Also, within five minutes drive south west is Lucy's Gully, a popular beauty spot in the Kaitake ranges that hit the national headlines in 2005 when the body of murdered German tourist Birgit Brauer was discovered there.

Ringcraft Moana is a manufacturing jewellery business with showroom, garden and a large pearl collection of abalone pearls. The Wavehaven, on Surf Highway 45 just south of Ōakura, offers accommodation and access to surfing beaches.

Once a year, Ōakura's artists are opening up their studios to the public in a two weekend event. The Ōakura Arts Trail can be found online

== Marae ==
The local Ōakura or Okorotua marae features the Moana Kaurai meeting house. It is a marae of the Taranaki Māori hapū of Ngāti Tairi.

Koru Pā is a historic reserve and pā situated 3 km south-east of Ōakura township. Thought to be one of the first Māori settlements in Taranaki, Māori tradition recognises it may have been built as early as 1300AD by Nga Mahanga a Tairi, a hapū of the Taranaki iwi.

== Education ==
Oakura School is a coeducational full primary (years 1–8) school with a decile rating of 10 and a roll of 379 students as of July 2026. The school was founded in 1866.

== Notable residents ==
- Ruhira Matekai (also known as Lucy Stevens) was a well-known Māori woman who lived in Ōakura in the 19th century. Lucy's Gully and Matekai Park are named after her.
- Professional surfer Paige Hareb is from Ōakura.
