= Hangatahua River =

Hangatahua (Stony) River
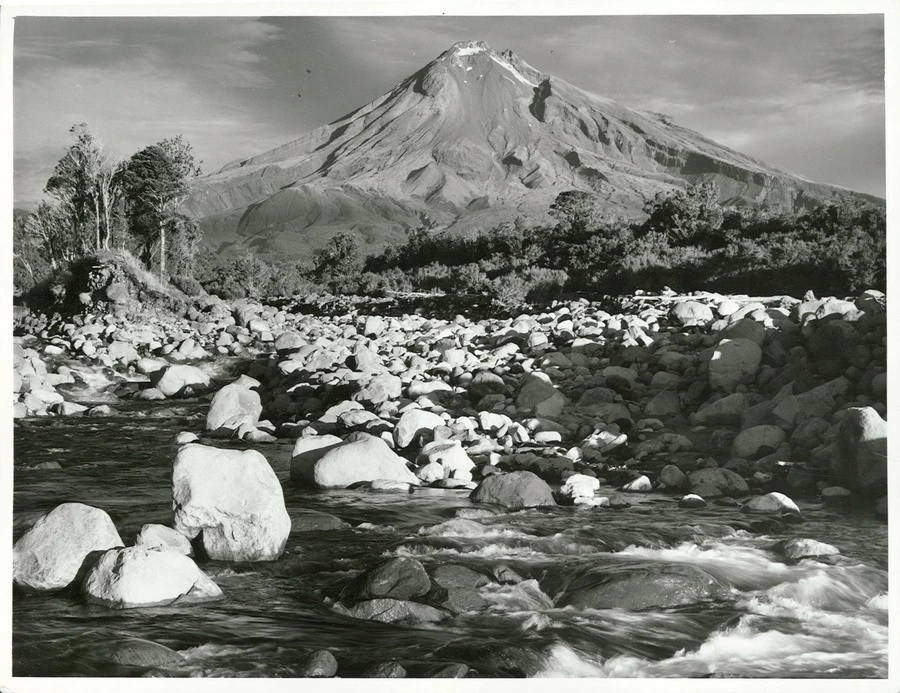
- Hangatahua River (aka Stony River) seen in 1972
- Route of the Hangatahua River
- Mouth of the Hangatahua River Hangatahua River (North Island)

Location
- Country: New Zealand

Physical characteristics
- Source
  - location: Ahukawakawa Swamp
  - coordinates: 39°15′19″S 174°02′23″E
  - elevation: 2,100 m (6,900 ft)
- Mouth
  - location: Tasman Sea
  - coordinates: 39°10′22″S 173°49′13″E
  - elevation: 0 metres (0 ft)
- Length: 16 km (10 mi)

Basin features
- Progression: Hangatahua River → Tasman Sea
- Tributaries
  - left: Minarapa Stream, Peters Stream, Upson Stream, Pyramid Stream, Turehu Stream, Maero Stream
  - right: Cataract Stream, Paul Stream
- Bridges: Hangatahua River Bridge

The Hangatahua River, alternatively known as the Stony River, is a river of the Taranaki Region of New Zealand. It is one of the larger of the numerous rivers and streams which drain the slopes of Mount Taranaki, receiving water from streams covering most of the northwest sector of the mountain. In addition it drains the southern flank of the Pouakai complex and the alpine Ahukawakawa Swamp. The river's upper reaches lie within Egmont National Park.

The Hangatahua River forms the boundary between New Plymouth District and South Taranaki District.

The river was considered Taranaki's best trout fishery until severe erosion and land instability in the river's headwaters since 1997 caused high sediment loads.

== Gallery ==
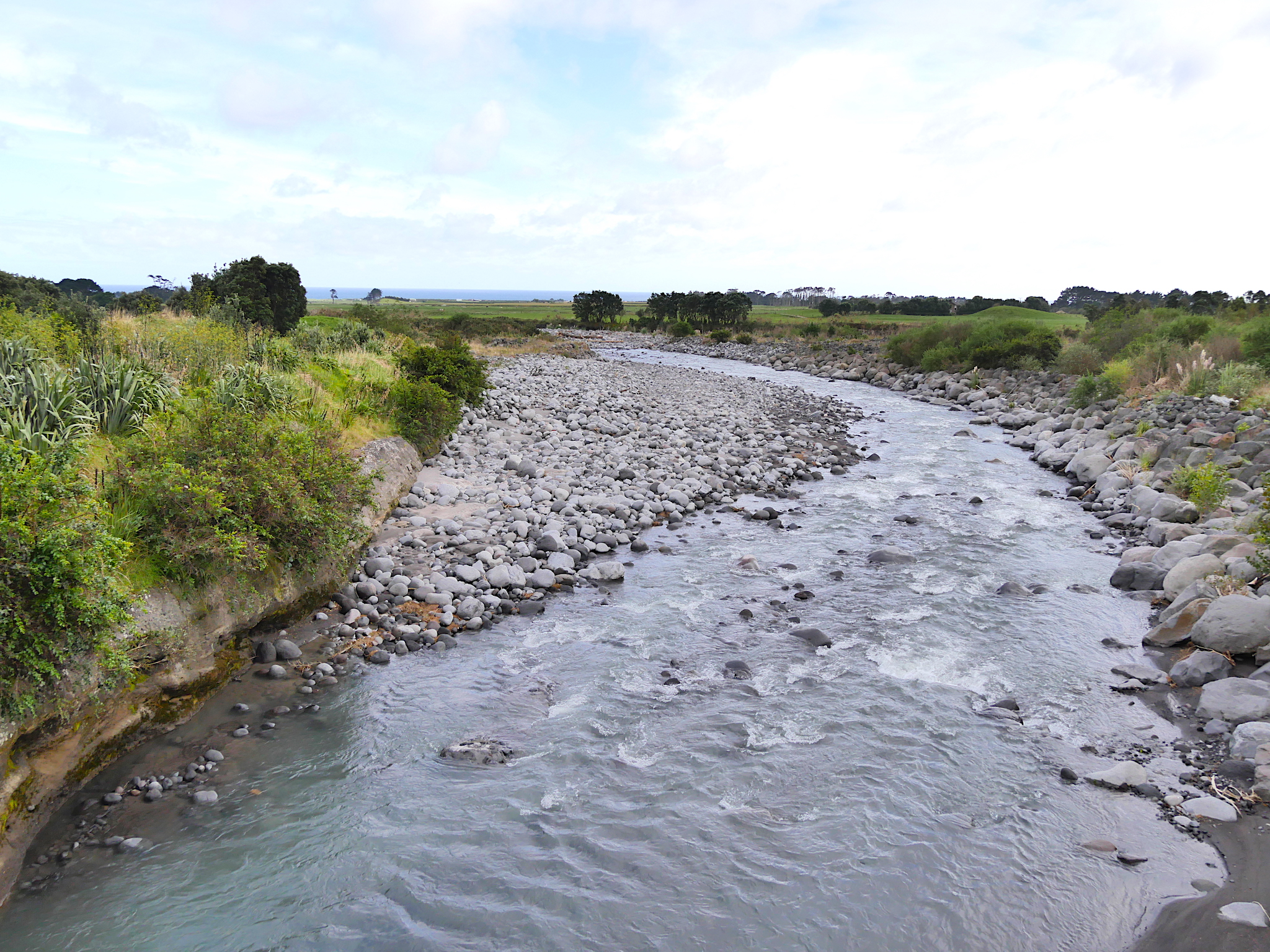
Near the mouth of the Hangatahua River

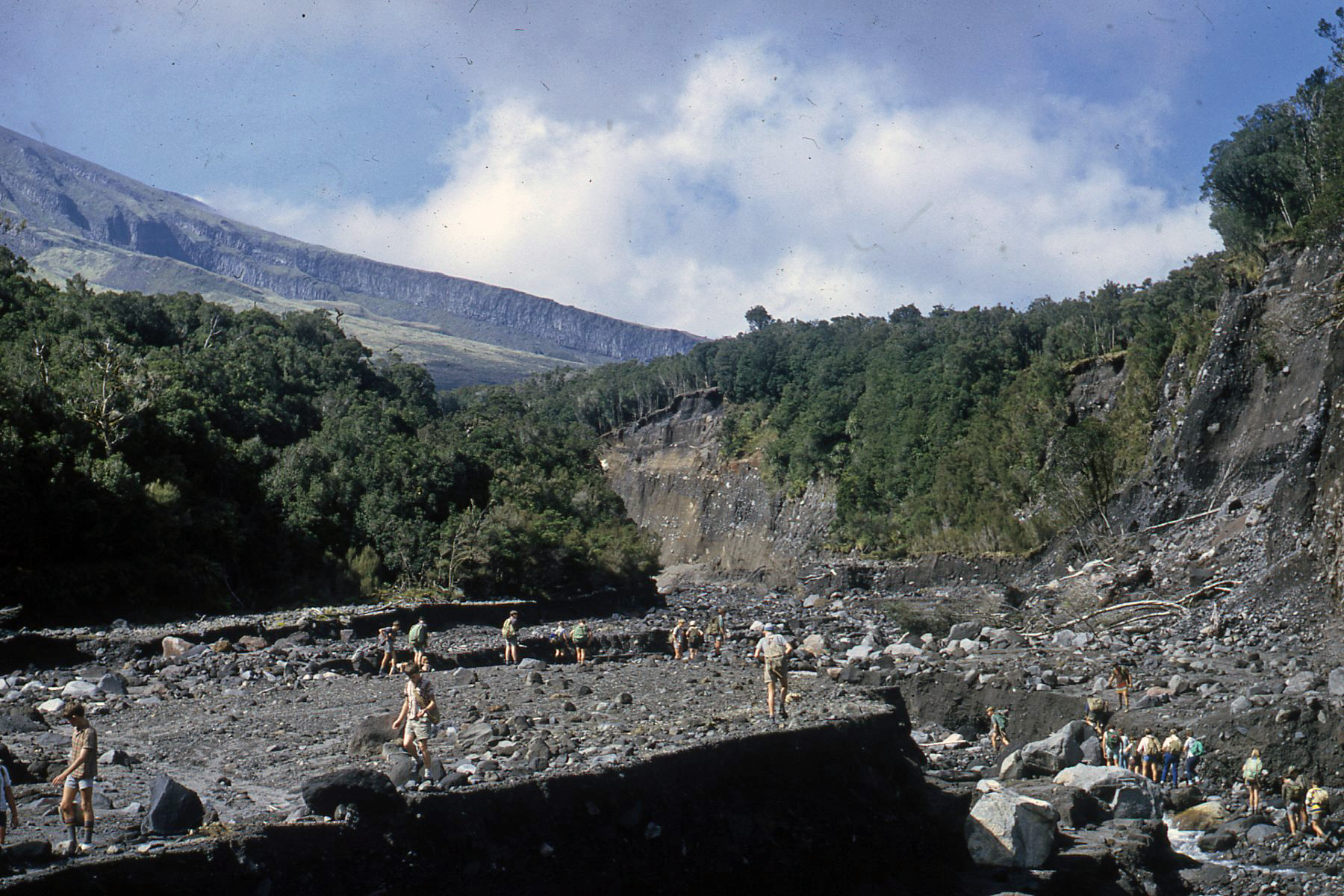
Spotswood College Tramping Club trip to the Stony River, 1968
