= Ōākuramatapū River =

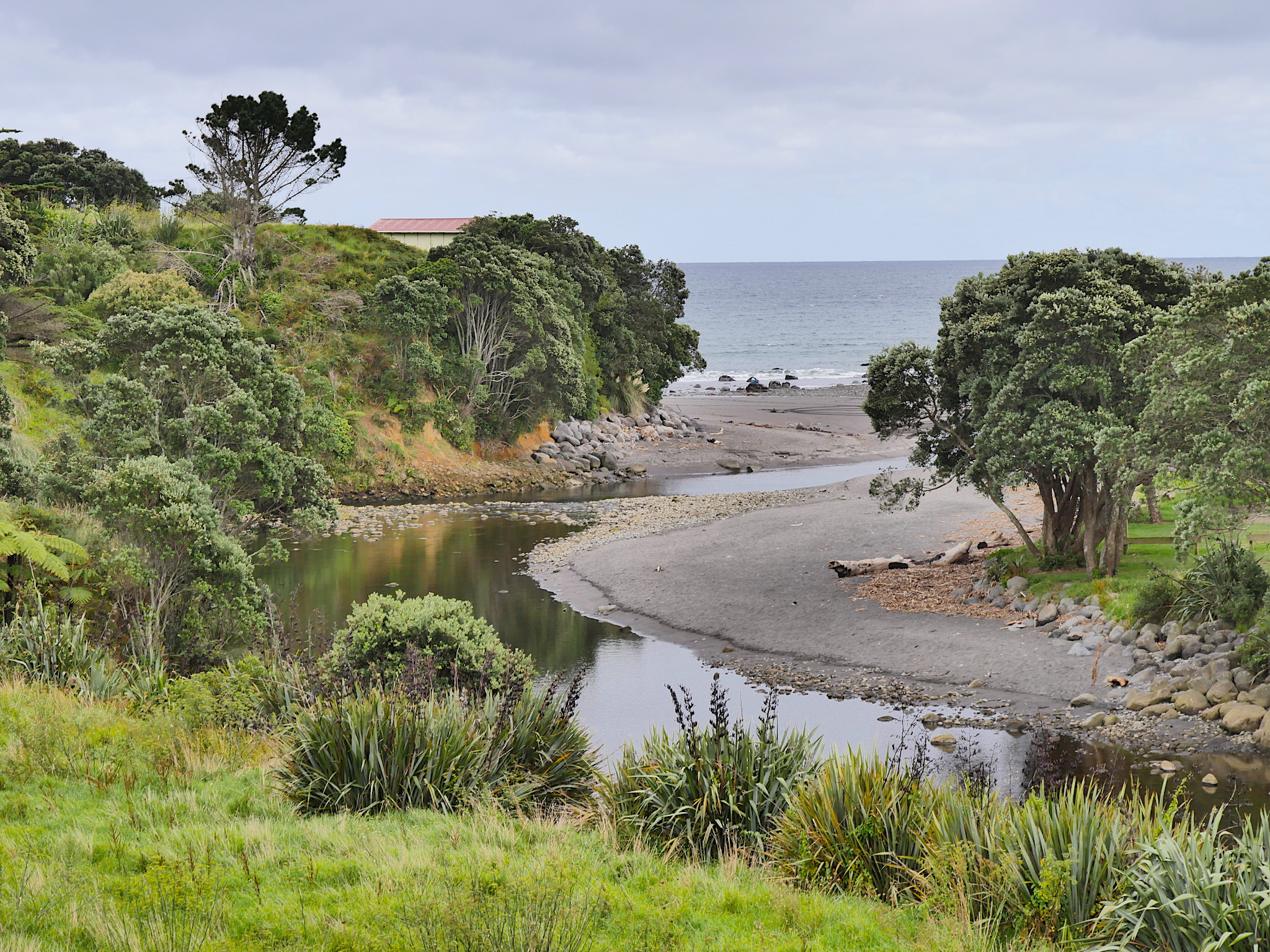
- View of the Ōākuramatapū River near the town of Ōakura
- Route of the Ōākuramatapū River
- Mouth of the Ōākuramatapū River Ōākuramatapū River (North Island)

Location
- Country: New Zealand

Physical characteristics
- Source
  - location: Pouākai Range
  - coordinates: 39°18′15″S 174°04′53″E
- Mouth
  - location: North Taranaki Bight
  - coordinates: 39°04′14″S 174°17′29″E
- Length: 17 kilometres (11 mi)

Basin features
- Progression: Ōākuramatapū River → North Taranaki Bight → Tasman Sea
- Tributaries
  - left: Pirongiha Stream, Te Pikiwati Stream, Wakamure Stream
  - right: Momona Stream, Kiri Stream, Oraukawa Stream
- Bridges: Ōakura River Bridge

The Ōākuramatapū River (formerly known as the Oakura River) is a river of the Taranaki Region of New Zealand's North Island. It flows north from Kiri Peak north of Pouākai Range on the northwestern slopes of Mount Taranaki. The river veers northwest before reaching the Tasman Sea at Ōakura, southwest of New Plymouth, passing the historical Ōakura Pā.

== See also ==
- List of rivers of New Zealand
