= Tataraimaka =

Coordinates: 39°10′S 173°55′E

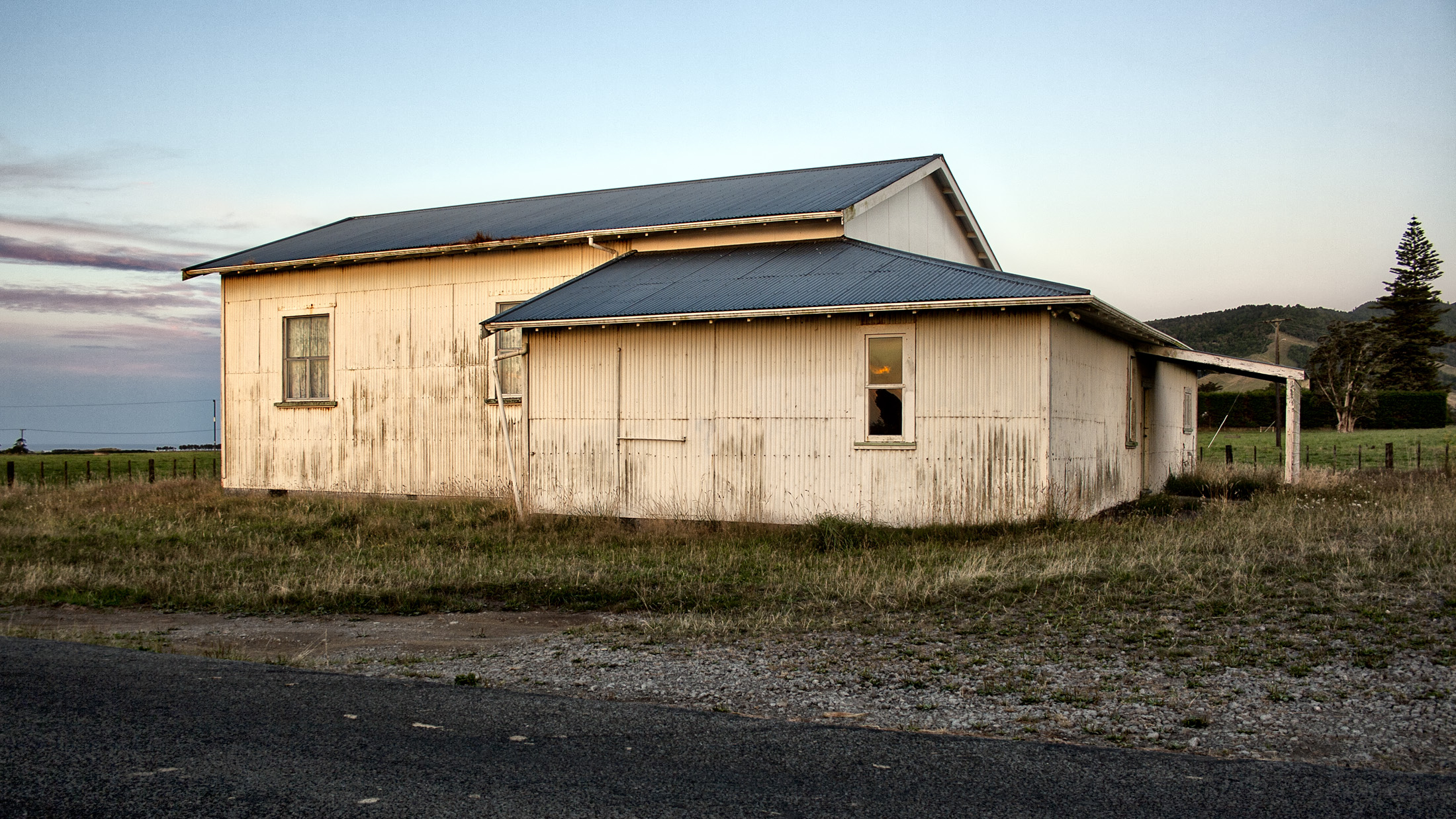
Tataraimaka hall

Tataraimaka is a rural coastal area in Taranaki, New Zealand. It is predominantly a dairy farming area, approximately 20 kilometres (12 mi) south-west of New Plymouth. Tataraimaka is located south of Ōakura and north of Ōkato. The Timaru River passes through Tataraimaka on its way from Mount Taranaki. The area lies close to the Kaitake ranges at the foot of mount Taranaki, and consists of steep farmlands which overlook rolling pastures, intercepted by many creeks and rivers leading to the rocky, west coast shoreline. The area is well known for its beaches. Weld Road Beach is a popular surf beach with the locals. The area is becoming increasingly popular for people building lifestyle properties. There are many hiking tracks available to the public which traverse the Kaitake Range. One of these treks is the Boars Head Mine track, which takes hikers to a historical gold mine.

In pre-European times, the area was extensively settled, with more than 30 pā sites found mainly on the shores of the Katikara River, Pitone Stream and Timaru River. One of the largest pā sites, Tataraimaka Pā, is a part of a historic reserve managed by the Department of Conservation. The pā was sacked by a party of northern Māori during the Musket Wars, shortly before 1820. The Tataraimaka Block of land was purchased from Māori in 1847, and was the location where 200 men of the 65th Regiment were stationed during the First Taranaki War, from April to June 1860. By March 1861, the Tataraimaka Block had been taken by Māori forces, and had returned to government control in early 1865.

Tataraimaka has a rich dairy farming history, with a historic dairy factory previously called the Timaru Creamery dating back to the nineteenth century. In 2008, a local farmer re-opened the factory as the Patua Co-operative Dairy Factory to provide an alternative to the dairy giant Fonterra. Production of their organic Okato Cheese ceased due to financial difficulties in 2010. The former dairy factory is currently used to showcase rock carvings.

On 10 October 1998 the Timaru River flooded and tore through Surf Highway 45. The road wasn't re-opened until 19 October.
