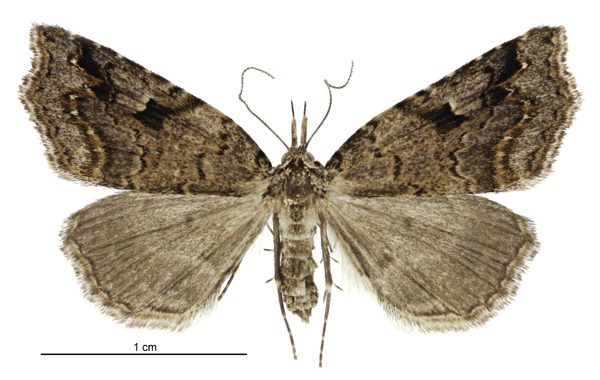
- Female
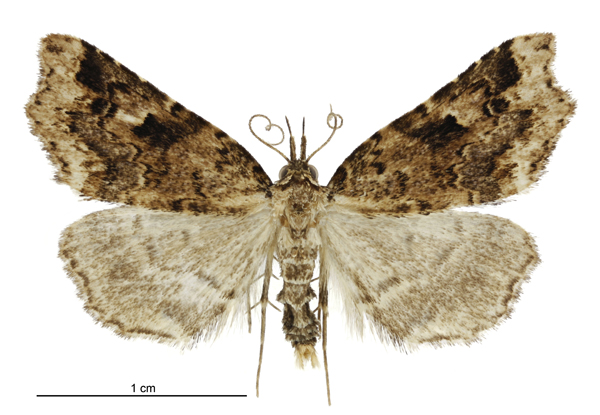
- Male

Scientific classification
- Kingdom: Animalia
- Phylum: Arthropoda
- Class: Insecta
- Order: Lepidoptera
- Superfamily: Noctuoidea
- Family: Erebidae
- Genus: Trigonistis
- Species: T. anticlina

Binomial name
- Trigonistis anticlina (Meyrick, 1901)

Synonyms
- Hypenodes anticlina Meyrick, 1901

= Trigonistis anticlina =

Species of moth

Trigonistis anticlina is a species of moth in the family Noctuidae. It is endemic to New Zealand. Adults of this species inhabit dense native forest habitat in ravines.

== Taxonomy ==
It was described by Edward Meyrick in 1901 using two specimens collected from Wellington by George Hudson. This species was initially confused with the Australian species Hyperaucha octias (now known as Lithilaria proestans) however Meyrick corrected his and Hudson's error. Hudson discussed and illustrated this species in his 1928 book The butterflies and moths of New Zealand. In 1988 John S. Dugdale assigned this species to the genus Trigonistis. The syntype specimens are held at the Natural History Museum, London.

== Description ==
This species was described by Meyrick as follows:

♂♀. 24-28 m.m. Head and thorax pale whitish-ochreous, sprinkled with fuscous and dark fuscous. Forewings triangular, costa arched anteriorly, slightly sinuate in middle, termen oblique, waved, concave on upper half, obtusely angulated on vein 4; pale whitish-ochreous, irregularly sprinkled with fuscous or brownish-ochreous; a short blackish line from costa almost at base; first line irregularly dentate, blackish, more or less partially obsolete; a rhomboidal spot of blackish-fuscous suffusion in disc above middle, above which are two short blackish-fuscous marks from costa; space between this and second line forming an irregular suffused white spot; costal edge above this dark fuscous dotted with whitish; second line waved, whitish, interruptedly edged anteriorly with blackish, curved inwards on lower half; subterminal dentate, pale, edged with fuscous, space between second and subterminal lines on upper third filled with blackish -fuscous; a terminal series of undefined dark fuscous dots : cilia fuscous-whitish, mixed with fuscous. Hindwings grey-whitish sprinkled with grey; a faint pale curved postmedian line, darker-edged anteriorly.

== Distribution ==
This species is endemic to New Zealand. It is found in the North Island and the north of the South Island. This species has been found to occur in and around National Park, Ohakune, Taihape, and its type locality of Wellington. It has also been collected at Dawson's Falls at Egmont National Park.

== Behaviour ==
T. anticlina is on the wing from October to December.

== Habitat and hosts ==
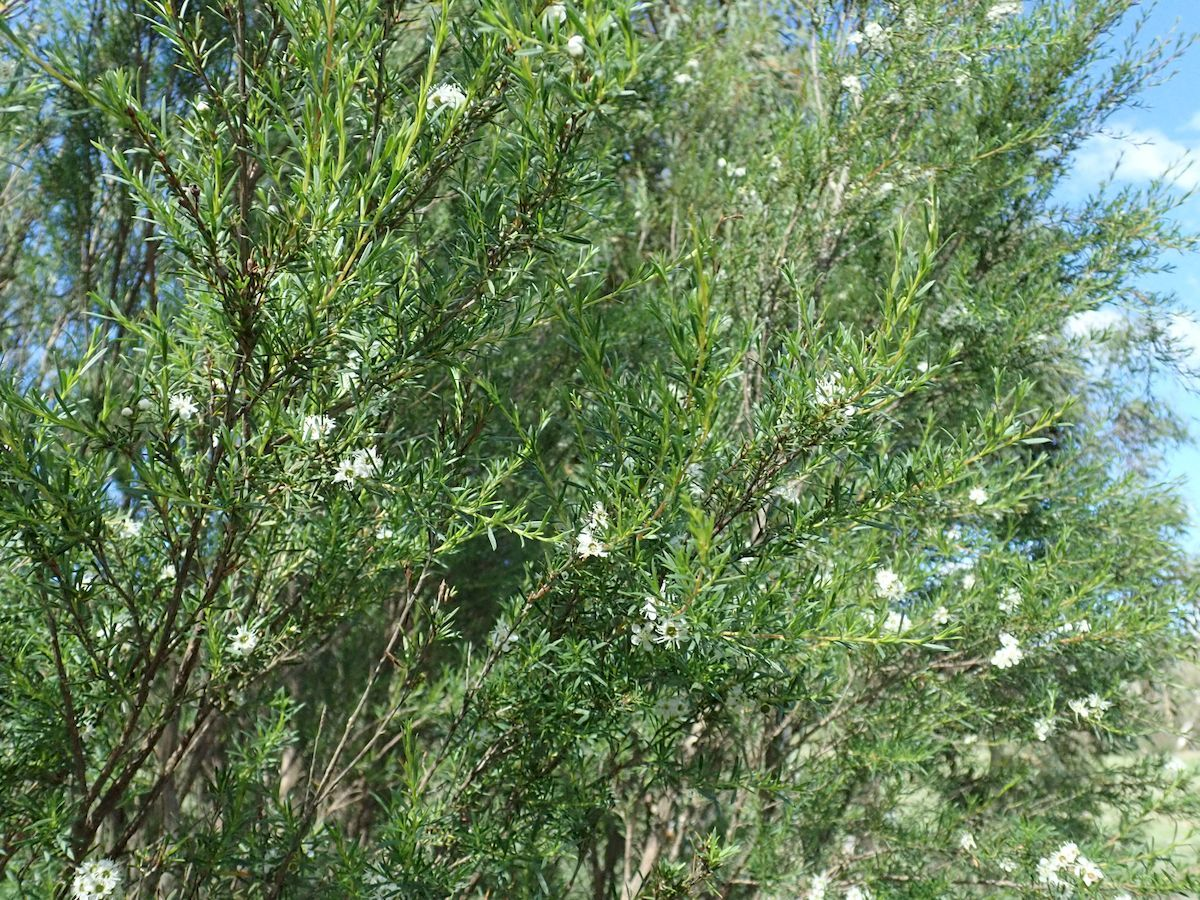
Kunzea ericoides

This species prefers dense forested ravine habitat. It can be found amongst dead leaf litter or fern fronds. The adults of the species has been found to be resident in leaf litter of kanuka (Kunzea ericoides) forest. Larvae are suspected to feed on native leaf litter or fungi.
