= Egmont National Park =

National park in New Zealand

- Te Papa-Kura-o-Taranaki (Māori)
- IUCN category II (national park)
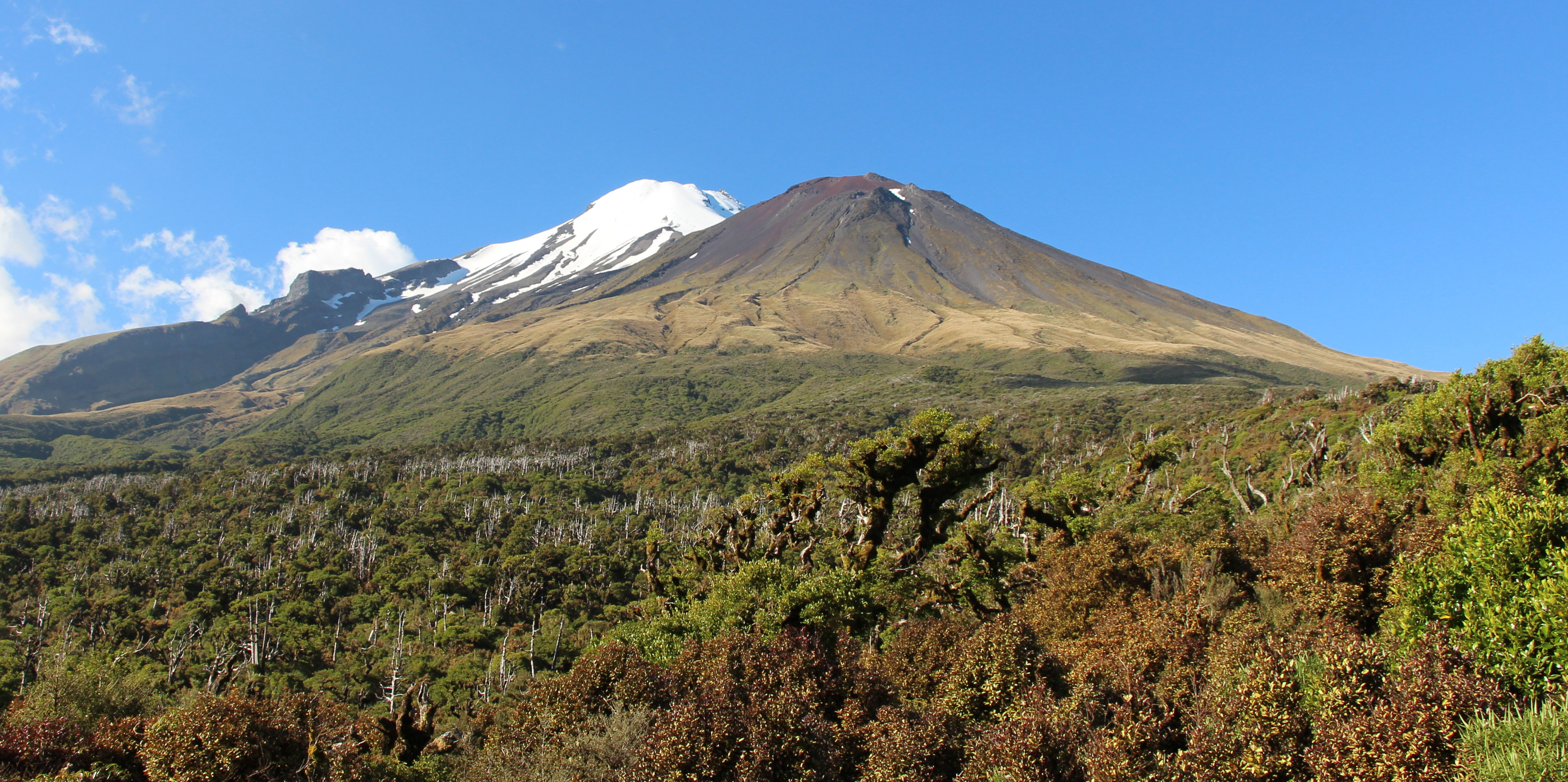
- Mount Taranaki
- Interactive map of Egmont National Park
- Location: Taranaki, New Zealand
- Nearest city: New Plymouth, New Zealand
- Coordinates: 39°16′0″S 174°6′0″E
- Area: 341.7 km^{2} (131.9 sq mi)
- Established: 1900
- Governing body: Department of Conservation

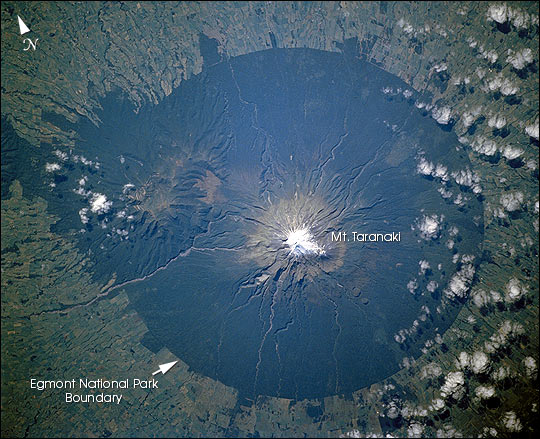
NASA satellite picture of Mount Taranaki showing the nearly-circular national park surrounding it

Egmont National Park, officially known as Te Papa-Kura-o-Taranaki, is a national park located south of New Plymouth, close to the west coast of the North Island of New Zealand. The park covers three volcanic cones: Mount Taranaki and its slopes, Pouākai and Kaitake. The park was first created in 1881 as a forest reserve and went on to become New Zealand’s second national park, preceded by Tongariro National Park, in 1900.

The forest reserve was created within a six-mile (9.7 km) radius around the cone of the dormant Mount Taranaki volcano. Areas encompassing the older volcanic remnants of Pouākai and Kaitake were later added to the reserve at the northwest side. The forest is surrounded on all sides by pasture, giving it a distinctly circular shape.

The official name of the park was changed from Egmont National Park to Te Papa-Kura-o-Taranaki on 1 April 2025.

== History ==
=== Early Māori history and legends ===
Mount Taranaki (Mt Egmont) is considered sacred by local Māori people who believe the mountain is where their ancestors descended from. Māori legend talks of Taranaki being called Pukeonaki and initially resided in central New Zealand next to Ruapehu, Tongariro, and Pihanga. It is said both Pukeonaki and Tongariro were in love with Pihanga and fought over her. Pukeonaki fled underground as Tongariro was stronger, and headed towards the sea. When Pukeonaki resurfaced, he fell in love with the Pouākai Range.

The name of the area was given by one of the first ancestors of the area Ruataranaki. A cave near the source of the Hangatahua River is the site of a burial cave called "Te Ana-a-Tahatiti".

=== Early pakeha ===
In 1770, Captain James Cook first saw Mount Taranaki from his ship HMS Endeavour. It was then that he named it Mount Egmont in honour of John Perceval, 2nd Earl of Egmont. In 1865, the mountain and surrounding land was seized by the crown government following the land wars in the 1860s as a form of punishment for rebellious Māori.

=== Park establishment ===
The first formal establishment of a protected area in the Taranaki area was in 1881 where all land within 9.6 km (6.0 mi) of the summit was made a forest reserve. The catalyst for this being extensive deforestation and burning in the area. The forest reserve was divided into four forest reserves that were managed by committees. The main reason for the creating for the reserves was for timber protection, however the committees promoted overall welfare and conservation of their areas. Responsibility was passed to the Taranaki Land Board in 1876. The Taranaki Scenery Reservation Society drafted a Bill to create Egmont National Park and in 1900 after public pressure the Egmont National Park Act was created. Egmont National Park become the second national park in New Zealand behind Tongariro National Park. The original committees were retained, as well as the creation of New Zealand's first national park board, which were active until their disestablishment in 1977 in an amendment to the National Parks Act.

=== Name change ===
The Taranaki Maunga Collective Redress Act 2025 was passed in February 2025, as a settlement of claims relating to breaches of the Treaty of Waitangi. The Act renames Egmont National Park to Te Papa-Kura-o-Taranaki, which means "the highly regarded and treasured lands of Taranaki". The settlement also made the national park and its contents, including Mount Taranaki (previously Mount Egmont), a vested legal person. This effectively means that the park owns itself. Te Tōpuni Kōkōrangi, a collective of both iwi and Crown representatives, will manage the park and develop plans which will be approved by the Conservation Minister. In April 2025, the New Zealand Geographic Board officially renamed Egmont National Park to Te Papa-Kura-o-Taranaki, along with changing 20 other Taranaki place names.

== Geography ==
Egmont National Park is located in the West of the North Island of New Zealand. It is distinctive from other national parks in New Zealand as it is surrounded by well developed agricultural land. The park encompasses a 9.9 km radius from the summit of Mt Taranaki as well as the Pouakai and the coastal Kaitake Ranges. The size of the park is approximately 33,000 hectares. New Plymouth, Hawera, and Stratford are within 30 kilometers from the national park boundary.

=== Geology ===
There are three volcanoes in the park, the Kaitaki Range, Pouakai Range and Mount Taranaki, the former of the two being extinct while Mount Taranaki is an active volcano in a state of dormancy. Lava flows, ash showers and lahars have moved volcanic material away from the peaks of the mountains and deposited them in the surrounding areas of the park. Lava flows can still be found in the west of the park.

Mineral deposits can be found throughout the park, particularly in the Kaitaki Ranges. These minerals such as ochre have only traditional value and interest in the geology of the park is purely scientific.

Soils vary throughout Egmont National Park as a result of volcanic and wild animal activity. All the soils are loose and weakly structured which means that they are prone to erosion. High rainfall in the area along creates leaching, and along with wild animal activity, means that re-vegetation is slow. Some parts of the park have poor soil drainage and swamps have formed as a result. In the southwest, northwest and north are Maero and Newall soils created by hot gasses and volcanic matter, called pyroclastic flows, from Mount Taranaki. Soils found in the southeast were created from pumice and scoria ejected from Mount Taranaki and Fanthams Peak in the period from 3,500 to 500 years ago. Soils in the east of the park result from the 1685 Burrell pumice shower.

=== Climate ===
The park is located on the west coast of the North Island and is exposed to prevailing winds from the west or northwest. Moist westerlies from the Tasman Sea create orographic precipitation when they reach Mount Taranaki and the adjacent Pouākai and Kaitake ranges. Southerly winds are also common. The elevation varies from around 100 m (330 ft) to 2,500 m (8,200 ft), leading to a wide range of climatic conditions. At low elevations around the Kaitake Range, the climate is mild and humid, with average annual rainfall of 1.5 m (4 ft 11 in). The higher elevation areas of the park experience annual rainfall of 6.3 to 7.5 m (21 to 25 ft). Peak daily rainfalls of 0.5 m (1.6 ft) have been recorded. At the summit of Mount Taranaki, the average wind speed is around 40 km/h (25 mph). Above 1,000 m (3,300 ft), gale force winds and blizzards are common, and the mountain is known for severe windchill conditions because of the combination of low temperatures, moisture and high wind speeds. Icy conditions are common at higher elevations.

The high annual rainfall and a mild coastal climate at lower elevations supports a temperate rainforest covering the foothills. The forest that is unusual nationally because of the total absence of beech trees (genus Nothofagus).

=== Mount Taranaki ===
Mount Taranaki, officially known as Taranaki Maunga, is a dormant stratovolcano that sits as a prominent feature in the center of the park. Sitting at 2,518 metres, it is the second largest mountain in the North Island. Mount Taranaki is considered a geologically young volcano starting activity around 200,000 years ago. It is believed that minor eruptions occur every 90 years, while major eruptions occur every 500 years. The last major eruption occurred around 1655. Much like the national park, the mountain's name was fiercely debated by the public, and was named 'Mount Egmont or Mount Taranaki' in 1985. The mountain was officially named Taranaki Maunga in 2025 along with the renaming of the national park.

=== Pouakai and Kaitake Range ===
The Pouakai and Kaitake Ranges are extinct stratovolcanoes that were a part of the Taranaki Volcanic Succession. Pouakai Range sits to the closest to the north of Mount Taranaki and has a height of 1,399 meters, while the Kaitaki Range sits further north towards the coast and is 684 meters high. The protected areas of these two ranges have a size of 4,965 hectares The Kaitake Range has distinctive flora compared to the other areas of the national park. Nikau, titoke, kohekohe, and puriri trees can only be found in the low lying coastal area of the Kaitake Range. An area of the Ahukawakawa wetland, located in the Pouakai Range, is a popular location for tourists wishing to get a photo of Mount Taranaki reflected in a tarn.

== Ecology ==
=== Flora ===
A rich northern rātā/rimu/broadleaf forest is present, although the entire park ecosystem displays distinct patterns of altitudinal zonation – the former two large species of tree are common at lower elevations whereas kāmahi tends to dominate the stunted high elevation forest. In these old growth forests the crown fern (Blechnum discolor) is a dominant understory plant species.

The character of the plant communities continues to change with increasing elevation, to subalpine and alpine shrublands at high elevations, which are in stark contrast to the surrounding pasture farmlands. Notable among the geographical features of the park is its clear radial drainage pattern, which can be discerned in the satellite picture at right.

The Kaitake Range is particularly distinct when compared with the rest of the national park. Three taxa found in the area is not found anywhere else in the park. Phymatosorus novae-zelandiae and Corybas aconitiflorus are two taxa that are not found anywhere else in the Taranaki district. Around 95% of the vegetation is native forest, mostly being kohekohe (Dysoxylum spectabile), tawa (Beilschmiedia tawa), and kamahi (Weinmannia racemosa). It has lowland and semi-coastal forest types that were found in the Taranaki volcanic plain before becoming farmland.

The Ahukawakawa Swamp is a rare high-elevation (920 m) sphagnum moss wetland located between Mount Taranaki and the Pouākai Range. It contains many endemic species adapted to acid soils and low temperatures.

=== Fauna ===
The national park is integral habitat for many species of birds that rely on the large forest. Threatened bird species within the park include blue duck (whio), North Island brown kiwi and fernbird. Nearly half of New Zealand's indigenous fish species are found in the park, including threatened giant kōkopu, shortjaw kōkopu, banded kōkopu and kōaro.

Introduced feral goats have historically degraded the forest understory. However, the park was declared free of feral goats in 2022, the first national park in New Zealand to be free of ungulates, as it was already free of feral pigs and deer. Pest animals present include possums, rodents, hares, stoats, weasels and ferrets.

== Conservation and human interaction ==
=== Management ===
The national park is co-managed by the New Zealand government and a group made up of representatives of the region's eight iwi called Te Tōpuni Ngārahu. Management plans that are developed for Te Tōpuni Ngārahu and the minister for conservation to consider are created by another group called Te Tōpuni Kōkōrangi. This group is half appointed by iwi and half appointed by the government. Local authorities such as the Taranaki Regional Council and New Plymouth, South Taranaki, and Stratford District Councils are responsible for activities related to the Resource Management Act 1991 and Biosecurity Act 1993, which involve animal and pest control as well as sustainable management of natural and physical resources. The New Zealand Police are responsible for search and rescue in the park as well as general law and order. The New Zealand Fire Service is responsible for fire management, although the Minister of Conservation is the fire authority.

=== Conservation ===
A number of projects from governmental and non-governmental organisations have commenced in an effort to remove predators from Egmont National Park and rebuild kiwi populations. In 2018, work was started to eradicate possums and mustelids from a 4500 hectare area. This area included the Kaitake Range and farmland as well as Oākura town. In 2023, an additional 5000 hectare area was added to the project. Goats were eradicated from the national park in 2022 following the worlds longest goat eradication programme.

Pests are controlled through a number of means and there are more than 1060 possum, stoat and ferrets traps within Egmont National Park. Aerial drops of the poison 1080 have also been used in the past to help control possum and stoat numbers in the park.

Due to an increase in visitor numbers, stress on alpine vegetation from being trampled led to the building of a boardwalk on the Pouakai circuit. Camping is also banned within 500 m of the Pouakai tarns due to rubbish and toileting concerns. In 2017, $3.4 million dollars was committed to improving areas within the Pouakai Range, including signage, boardwalks and toileting facilities.

=== Activities ===
The National Park is a popular tourist location with the Department of Conservation estimating up to 400,000 people visited Egmont National Park in 2017. Popular activities in the park include tramping, hunting and skiing. While there are no deer, pigs or goats in the park, permits can be obtained for hunting possums.

==== Pouakai circuit ====
The Pouakai Circuit is a 25 kilometer tramping that track passes through forest, alpine tussock fields, and the Ahukawakawa Swamp. The circuit starts at the North Egmont visitor center, can be walked in either direction and takes about two to three days. Holly Hut and Pouakai Hut are available for trampers to stay in. It is a mostly unformed track but is marked with markers and poles. The track can become impassable in winter due to snow and ice fall

==== Mount Taranaki summit ====
The summit is a popular climb, with over 20,000 people climbing the mountain every year. The summit is a 8–10 hour round trip that starts at the North Egmont Visitor Center. Ice can be found all year round in the crater and specialised tramping gear such as crampons and an ice axe may be required. The very summit of the mountain is considered sacred by Maori and climbing to the highest point is considered offensive.

==== Around the mountain circuit ====
The around the mountain circuit is a 52 kilometer loop tramping track that takes about five to seven days to complete. The track covers forests, rivers and alpine areas of the park. There are high and low route options, with the former being impassable at times due to snowfall during the winter.

==== Manganui ski area ====
Manganui Ski Area is a ski field on Mount Taranaki operated by the Stratford Mountain Club and run by volunteers. Skiing on the mountain first started in 1917 but was only sporadic and no defined ski fields were established until 1929. The ski field has two sections, the upper ski field and lower ski field. The lower ski field sits at 1250–1360 meters above sea level and has a gradient of about twenty degrees. The upper ski field sits at 1400–1680 meters above sea level and has ski runs of about 25 degrees. Both areas have lifts, with the lower area having a modern T-bar lift while the upper ski field has a long rope tow. Manganui Ski Area has a skiable area of 59 hectares. The snow season is usually from early June to mid-October.

== Gallery ==
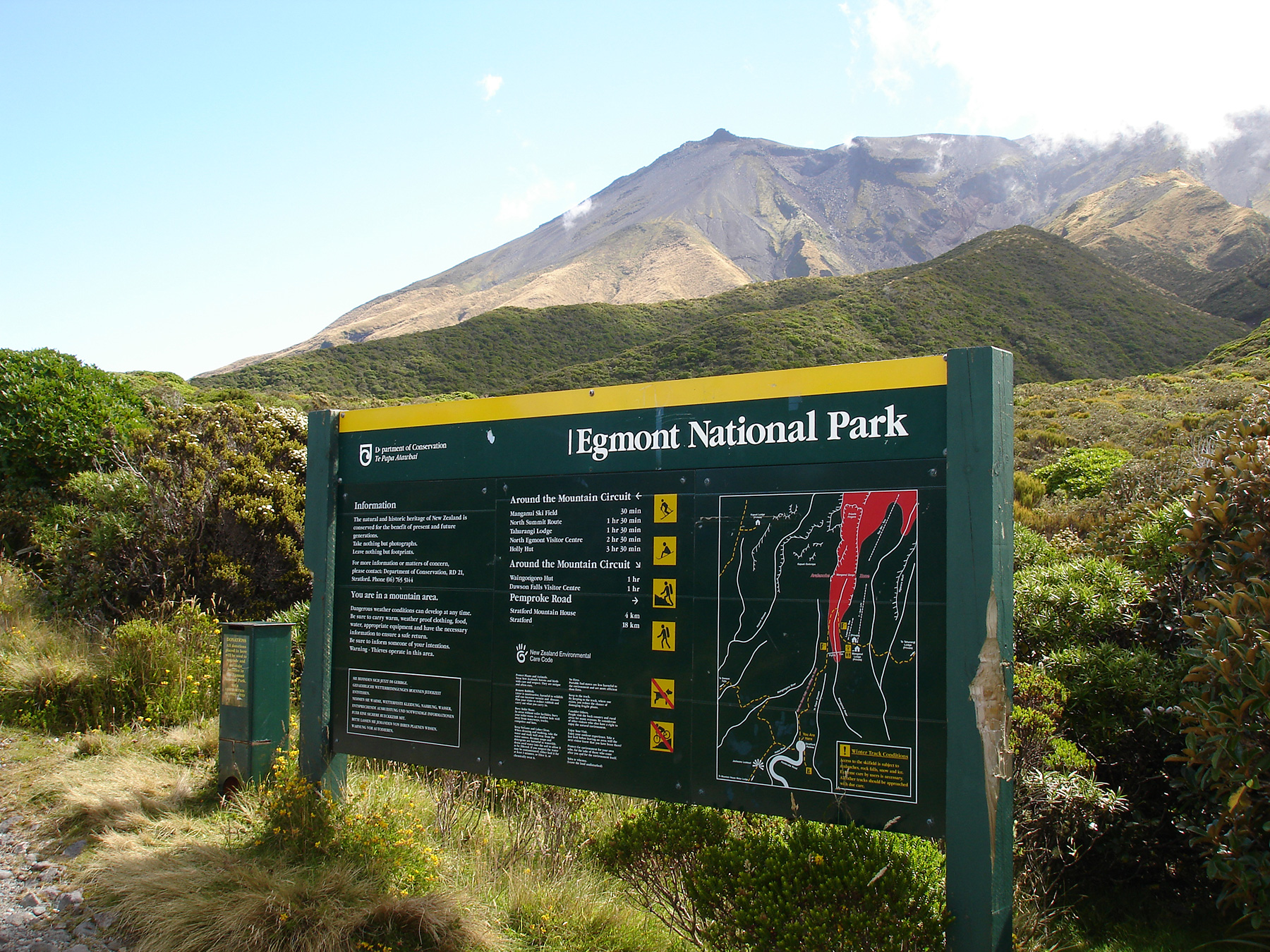
Entrance sign

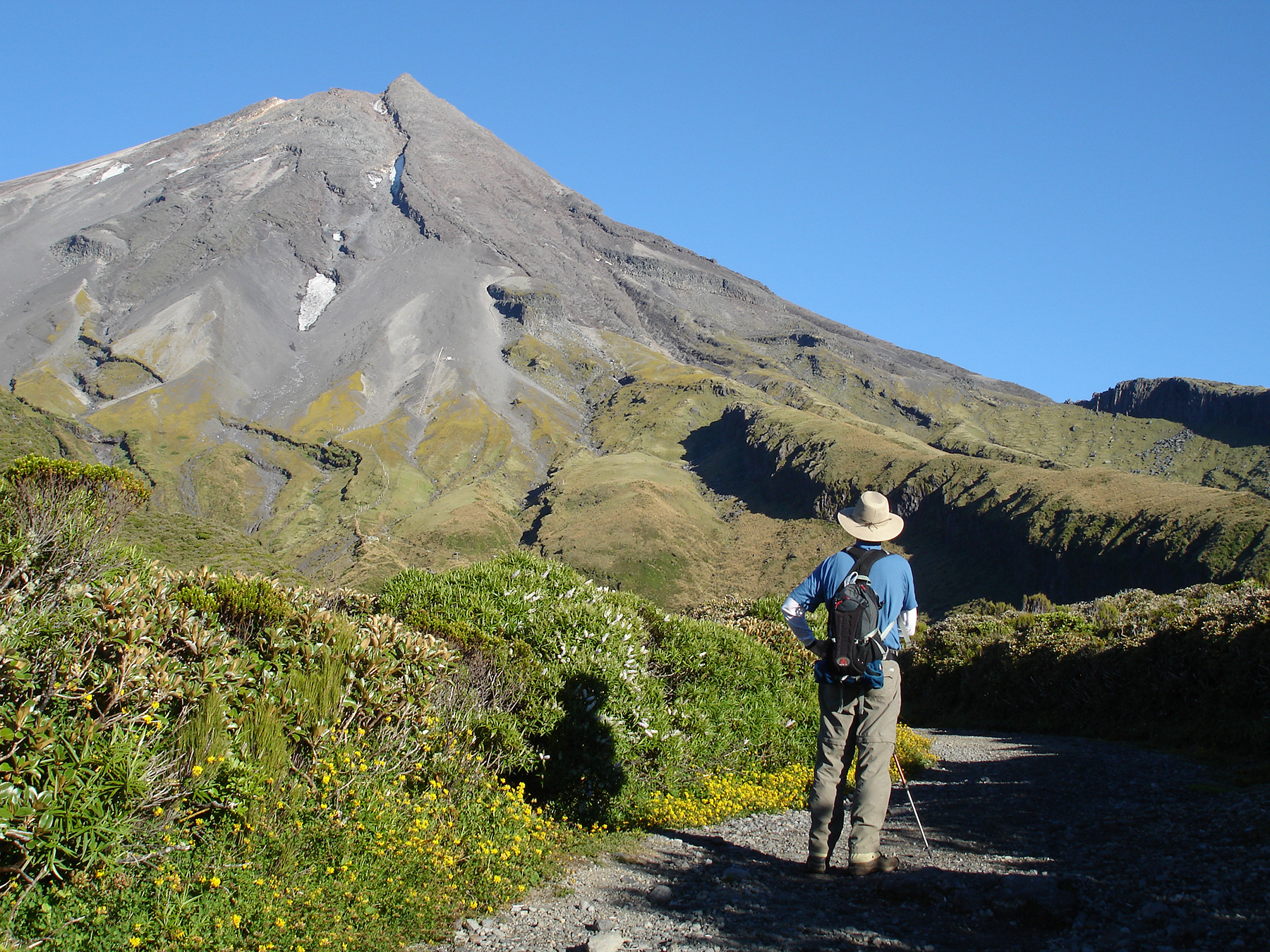
Low on the trail to the summit of Mount Taranaki

== See also ==
- Forest parks of New Zealand
- List of mountains of New Zealand by height
- National parks of New Zealand
- Protected areas of New Zealand
