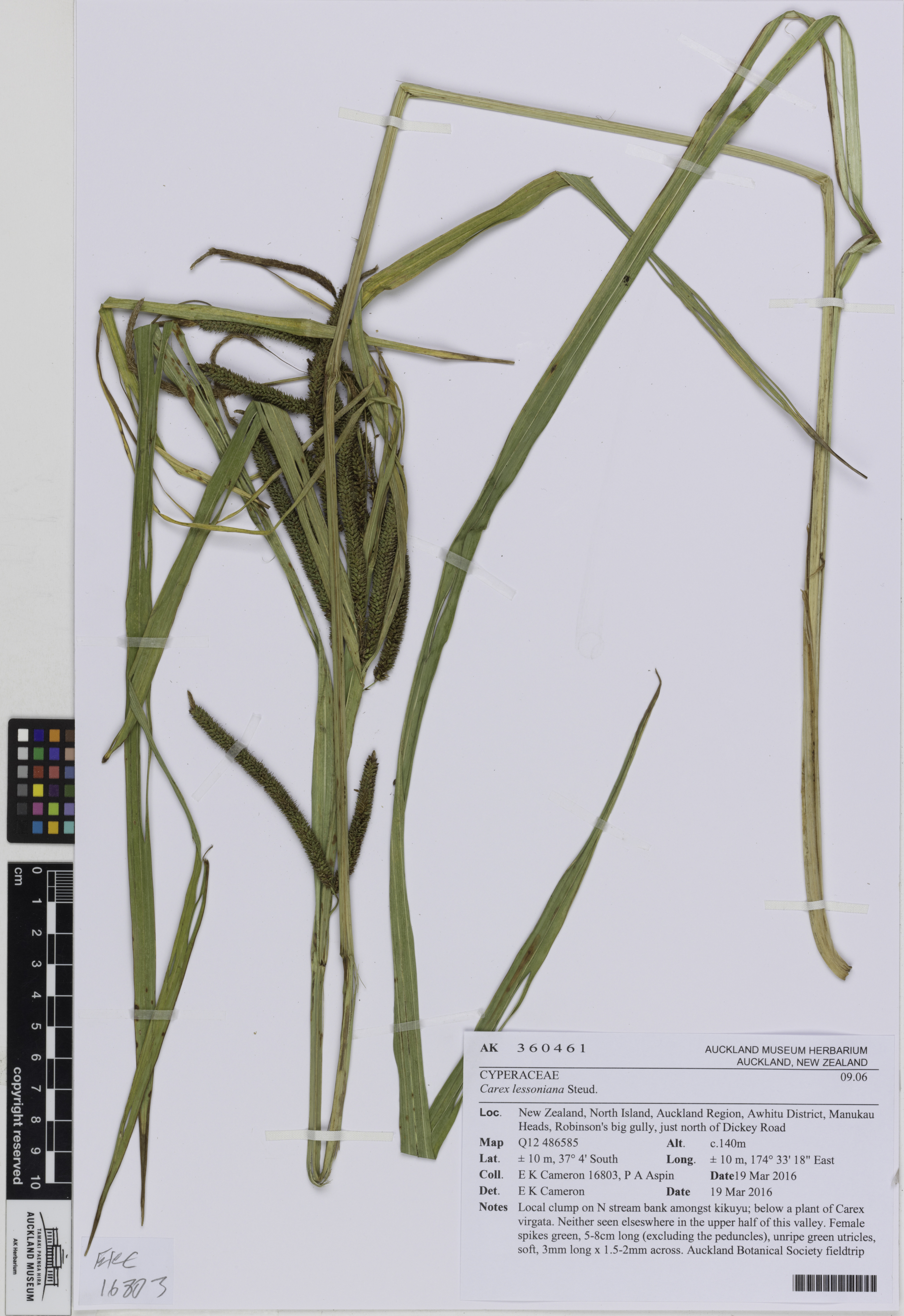

Scientific classification
- Kingdom: Plantae
- Clade: Embryophytes
- Clade: Tracheophytes
- Clade: Angiosperms
- Clade: Monocots
- Clade: Commelinids
- Order: Poales
- Family: Cyperaceae
- Genus: Carex
- Species: C. lessoniana

Binomial name
- Carex lessoniana Steud.

= Carex lessoniana =

Species of plant

Carex lessoniana, also commonly known as rautahi or cutty grass, is a tussock-forming species of perennial sedge in the family Cyperaceae. It is native to parts of New Zealand.

== Description ==
The robust bright green to dark green sedge has a rhizome and typically grows to a height of 0.5 to 1.5 m (1 ft 8 in to 4 ft 11 in). It has culms with a triangular cross-section and a diameter to 1.5 to 5 mm (0.059 to 0.197 in) with a rough texture on the edges. The dull brown or red-brown basal sheaths have margins that deteriorate to fibres that are wrapped around the culm. It has many leaves, usually many more than the culms. The leaves are double folded and have a width of 3.5 to 8 mm (0.14 to 0.31 in) and have a rough texture along the edges. It flowers between October and December and fruits between December and April. The brown coloured biconvex to obovoid shaped nut that it produces is about 1.5 mm (0.059 in) in length and is found in the lower half of the utricle.

== Taxonomy ==
The species was described in 1840 by the botanist Ernst Gottlieb von Steudel as a part of the work Nomenclator botanicus. It has one synonym; Carex polystachya. C. lessoniana is closely allied with Carex coriacea, Carex germinata and Carex terneria. The specific epithet honours the French botanist and surgeon René Primevère Lesson.

== Distribution ==
The plant is usually situated in lowland and coastal areas often located in areas of wet alluvial forests or along the edge of peat swamps. It is endemic to New Zealand and is found on both the North Island and the South Island. It is more common on the North Island where is much more wise spread. In the South Island it is mostly found in the northern half and much less common in the southern portion.

== See also ==
- List of Carex species
