= Trigonistis =

Scientific classification
- Kingdom: Animalia
- Phylum: Arthropoda
- Class: Insecta
- Order: Lepidoptera
- Superfamily: Noctuoidea
- Family: Erebidae
- Subfamily: Hypeninae
- Genus: Trigonistis; Meyrick, 1902

Genus of moths

Trigonistis is a genus of moths of the family Erebidae. The genus was erected by Edward Meyrick in 1902.

== Species ==
- Trigonistis andersoni Holloway, 1977 Norfolk Island
- Trigonistis anticlina (Meyrick, 1901) New Zealand
- Trigonistis demonias Meyrick, 1902 Queensland
- Trigonistis toroensis Holloway, 1977 New Caledonia
