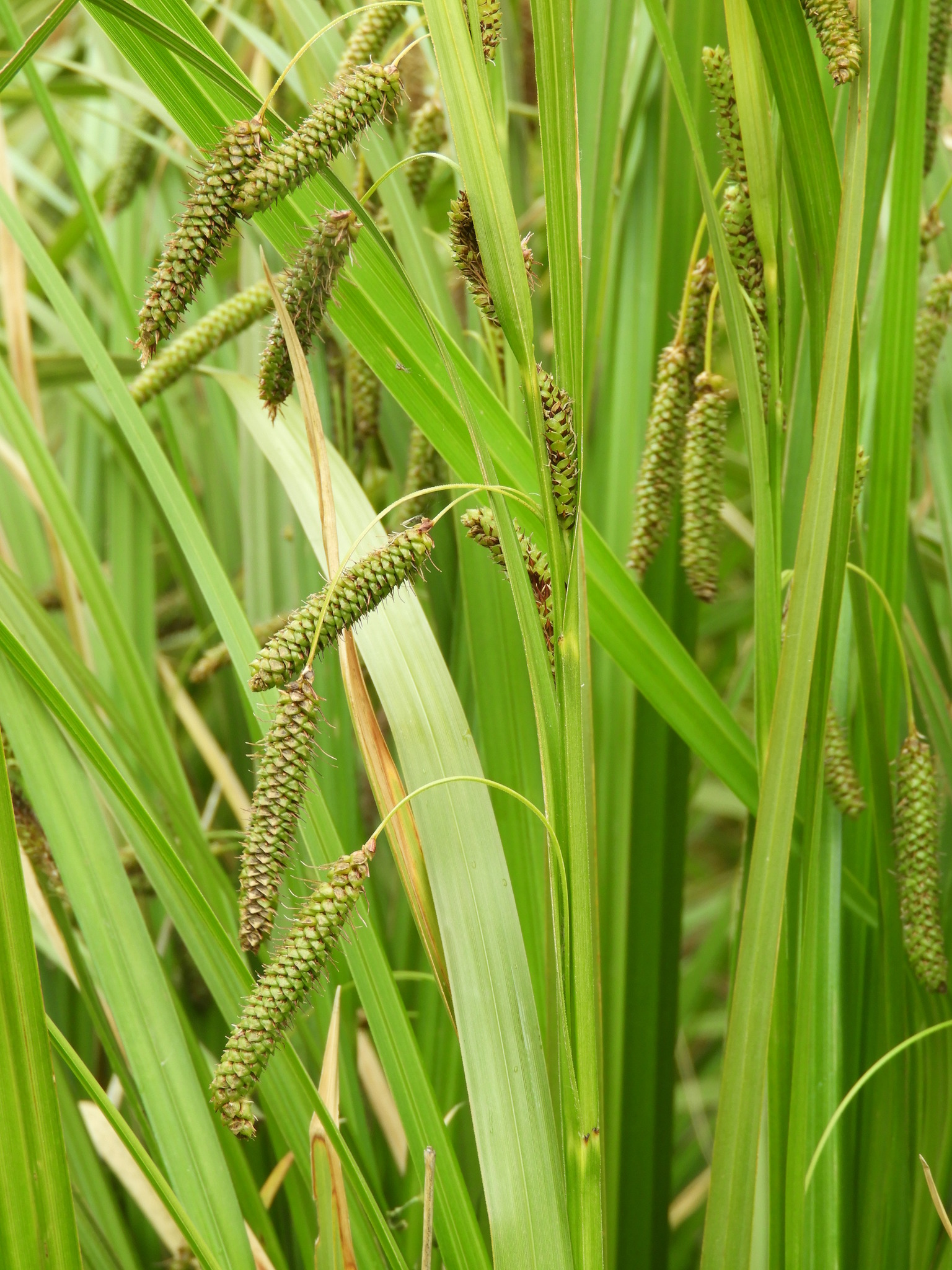

Scientific classification
- Kingdom: Plantae
- Clade: Tracheophytes
- Clade: Angiosperms
- Clade: Monocots
- Clade: Commelinids
- Order: Poales
- Family: Cyperaceae
- Genus: Carex
- Species: C. coriacea

Binomial name
- Carex coriacea Hamlin

= Carex coriacea =

Species of grass-like plant

Carex coriacea, commonly known as cutty grass or rautahi, is a sedge that is found in the North Island of New Zealand.

== See also ==
- List of Carex species
