= Kaitake Range =

Mountain range in New Zealand

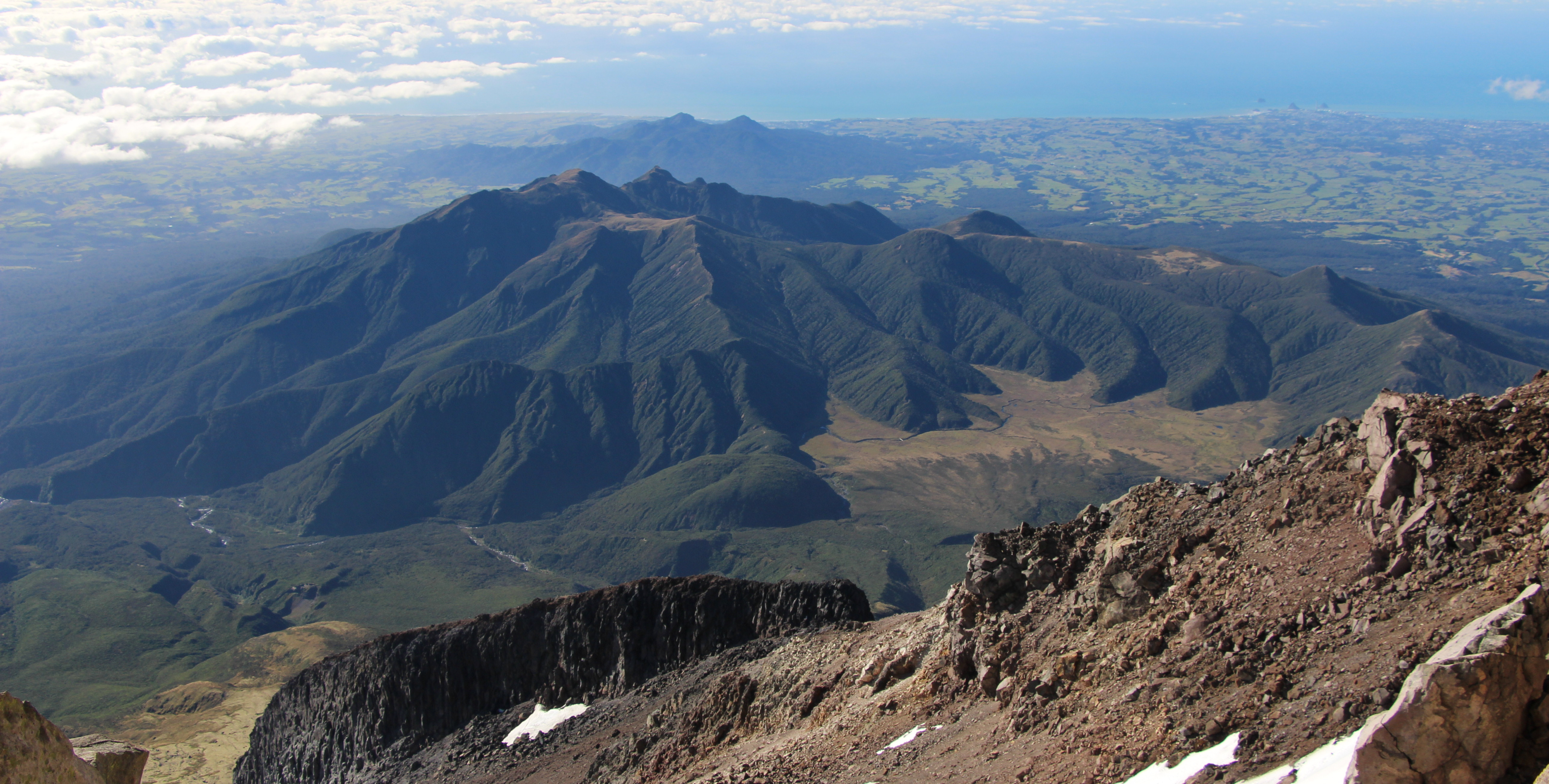
- The Pouākai Range viewed from Mount Taranaki, with the Kaitake Range in the background

Highest point
- Peak: Patuha
- Elevation: 684 m (2,244 ft)
- Coordinates: 39°09′41″S 173°57′57″E

Geography
- Kaitake andesite (red shading) under label "Oakura" on map. The surrounding debris and lahar fields are not shown but extend to the coast. To its south-south-east are the younger andesitic volcanoes being the small cone of Pukeiti, then the Pouākai and Mount Taranaki. Legend: Key for the volcanics that are shown with panning is: '"`UNIQ--templatestyles-00000005-QINU`"' basalt (shades of brown/orange); '"`UNIQ--templatestyles-00000006-QINU`"' monogenetic basalts; '"`UNIQ--templatestyles-00000007-QINU`"' undifferentiated basalts of the Tangihua Complex in Northland Allochthon; '"`UNIQ--templatestyles-00000008-QINU`"' arc basalts; '"`UNIQ--templatestyles-00000009-QINU`"' arc ring basalts; '"`UNIQ--templatestyles-0000000A-QINU`"' dacite; '"`UNIQ--templatestyles-0000000B-QINU`"' andesite (shades of red); '"`UNIQ--templatestyles-0000000C-QINU`"' basaltic andesite; '"`UNIQ--templatestyles-0000000D-QINU`"' rhyolite (ignimbrite is lighter shades of violet); '"`UNIQ--templatestyles-0000000E-QINU`"' plutonic; White shading is selected caldera features.; Clicking on the rectangle icon enables full window and mouse-over with volcano name/wikilink and ages before present.
- Location: North Island, New Zealand

Geology
- Rock age: 575 ka Pleistocene
- Rock type: Andesite
- Volcanic belt: Taranaki Volcanic Lineament
- Last eruption: 350 ka

The Kaitake Range, like the neighbouring Pouākai Range, is an eroded and heavily vegetated stratovolcano that formed during the Pleistocene epoch in the Taranaki region of New Zealand. Kaitake is the northwesternmost of the stratovolcanoes in the region. It is about 500,000 years old and last erupted around 350,000 years ago. Its final collapse about 250,000 years ago appears to have been potentially associated with a collapse event of the Pouākai volcano.

The region was often reshaped after each cone collapse from Mount Taranaki. Kaitake and Pouākai continued to be damaged from the erupting Mount Taranaki volcano. Although Kaitake is largely eroded, the volcanic base of the mountain range is still fairly intact and can be seen as a smooth sloping mountain range from New Plymouth. Kaitake represents some of the oldest inland volcanic activity on the Taranaki peninsula, being younger than only the Sugar Loaf Islands.

== Geology ==
The Kaitake Range volcano is situated in the Taranaki Basin and is part of the Taranaki Volcanic Lineament which has had a 30 mm/yr north to south migration over the last 1.75 million years. Present-day seismicity and stress directions in eastern Taranaki are consistent with back-arc extension processes. The Taranaki Volcanic Lineament members as they decrease in age from northwest to southeast are:

1. Paritutu, and the Sugar Loaf Islands from 1.75 Ma
2. Kaitake from 575 ka
3. Pouākai 210–250 ka
4. Mount Taranaki <200 ka

=== Volcanic activity ===
"At the beginning of Hāwera time a fresh active center arose at Kaitake. It shows no obvious structural relationship with the Sugar Loaves and appears to have been the first activity on a new line. Volcanism from this center continued during three episodes of ring-plain formation alternating with two episodes of marine cliffing, before it became extinct. The agglomerates of the younger two ring plains have been seen to overlie marine sediments deposited during the previous Kaiatea II and III periods of marine cliffing. The volcano produced is now so greatly eroded that the detailed form of the peak is unknown. However, the shape of the lower parts of the volcano, still well preserved, suggests that it was essentially a simple cone on the Egmont plan rather than a complex feature like the volcanoes of Tongariro National Park." It can be postulated that all volcanoes in the Taranaki Volcanic Lineament have had a similar potential for instability and were stratovolcanoes of similar size and shape to the present Mount Taranaki between major collapse events given their debris plains. They may well have had major collapse cycles similar to that presently shown by Mount Taranaki which is a potential maximum size of collapse of 7.9 km^{3} (1.9 cu mi) every 30,000 to 35,000 years.

== Nearby volcanoes ==
- Sugar Loaf Islands
- Pouākai Volcano
- Taranaki Volcano
