= Pouākai Range =

Mountain range in New Zealand

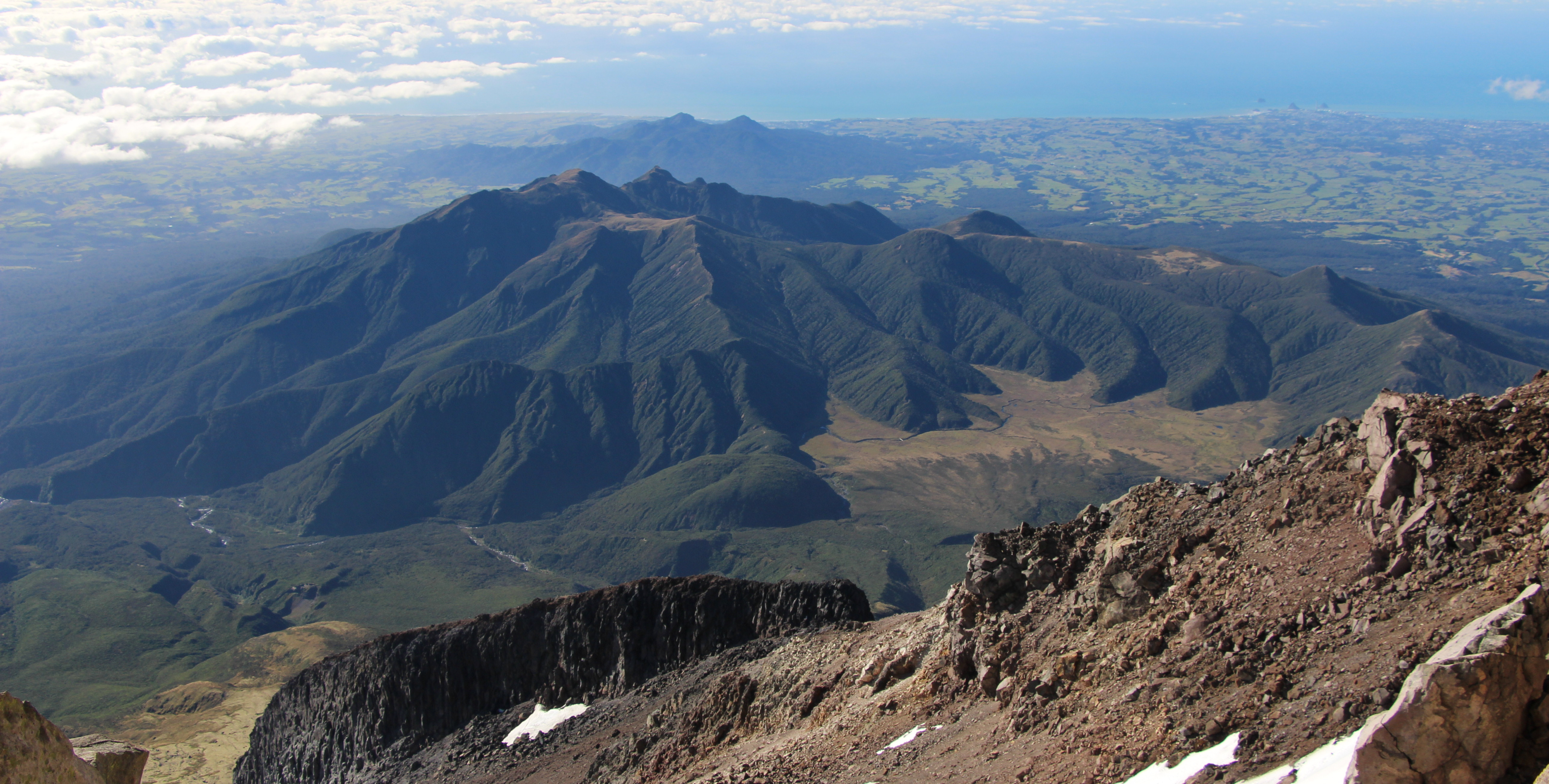
- The Pouākai Range viewed from Mount Taranaki, with the Kaitake Range in the background

Highest point
- Peak: Pouākai
- Elevation: 1,395 m (4,577 ft)
- Coordinates: 39°14′17″S 174°00′51″E

Geography
- Pouākai andesite (red shading) in centre of map. To its south-south-east is the younger and presently larger in andesitic direct deposits volcano of Mount Taranaki. The surrounding debris and lahar fields are not shown but include the green forested area on the map. To its north west are the older volcanoes of the small cone of Pukeiti, then the Kaitake. Legend: Key for the volcanics that are shown with panning is: '"`UNIQ--templatestyles-00000005-QINU`"' basalt (shades of brown/orange); '"`UNIQ--templatestyles-00000006-QINU`"' monogenetic basalts; '"`UNIQ--templatestyles-00000007-QINU`"' undifferentiated basalts of the Tangihua Complex in Northland Allochthon; '"`UNIQ--templatestyles-00000008-QINU`"' arc basalts; '"`UNIQ--templatestyles-00000009-QINU`"' arc ring basalts; '"`UNIQ--templatestyles-0000000A-QINU`"' dacite; '"`UNIQ--templatestyles-0000000B-QINU`"' andesite (shades of red); '"`UNIQ--templatestyles-0000000C-QINU`"' basaltic andesite; '"`UNIQ--templatestyles-0000000D-QINU`"' rhyolite (ignimbrite is lighter shades of violet); '"`UNIQ--templatestyles-0000000E-QINU`"' plutonic; White shading is selected caldera features.; Clicking on the rectangle icon enables full window and mouse-over with volcano name/wikilink and ages before present.
- Location: North Island, New Zealand

Geology
- Rock age(s): 250 ka, Pleistocene
- Rock type: Andesite
- Volcanic belt: Taranaki Volcanic Lineament
- Last eruption: 210 ka

The Pouākai Range is an eroded and heavily vegetated stratovolcano in the North Island of New Zealand, located northwest of Mount Taranaki. It consists of the remains of a collapsed Pleistocene stratovolcano. The range is surrounded by a ring plain of lahar deposits from a massive collapse that has been dated as roughly 250,000 years old.

The region has been reshaped more recently after each cone collapse from Mount Taranaki.

== Geology ==
The Pouākai Range volcano is situated in the Taranaki Basin and is part of the Taranaki Volcanic Lineament which has had a 30 mm/yr north to south migration over the last 1.75 million years. Present-day seismicity and stress directions in eastern Taranaki are consistent with back-arc extension processes. The Taranaki Volcanic Lineament members as they decrease in age from northwest to southeast are:

1. Paritutu, and the Sugar Loaf Islands from 1.75 Ma
2. Kaitake from 575 ka
3. Pouākai 210–250 ka
4. Mount Taranaki <200 ka

=== Volcanic activity ===
"After the extinction of the Kaitake center, eruptions broke out at Pouākai 6 miles south-east of Kaitake. Activity from this center continued over a long period of ring-plain formation, a period of marine erosion during which volcanic activity decreased, and part way through another period of ring-plain building, before activity broke out from the next center." It can be postulated that all volcanoes in the Taranaki Volcanic Lineament have had a similar potential for instability and were stratovolcanoes of similar size and shape to the present Mount Taranaki between major collapse events given their debris plains. They may well have had major collapse cycles similar to that presently shown by Mount Taranaki which is a potential maximum size of collapse of 7.9 km^{3} (1.9 cu mi) every 30,000 to 35,000 years.

== Nearby volcanoes ==
- Sugar Loaf Islands
- Kaitake Volcano
- Taranaki Volcano
