= Mount Taranaki =

Volcano in North Island of New Zealand

- Taranaki Maunga (Māori)
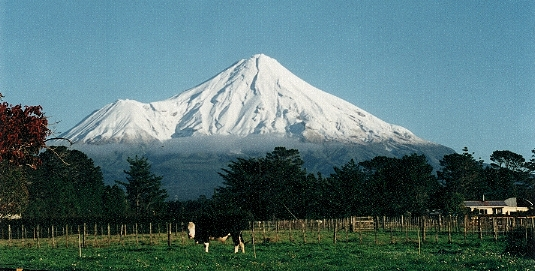
- View of Mount Taranaki from Stratford, showing Fanthams Peak on the southern flank

Highest point
- Elevation: 2,518 m (8,261 ft)
- Prominence: 2,308 m (7,572 ft)
- Listing: Ultra; New Zealand #65
- Coordinates: 39°17′47″S 174°03′53″E

Geography
- Location within New Zealand
- Taranaki andesite (red shading) in centre of map. The surrounding debris and lahar fields are not shown although they include the green forested area on the map that surround Mount Taranaki and the Pouākai Range and have reached the sea in all directions on the Taranaki peninsula except where blocked by the Pouākai Range. To its north are the older andesitic volcanoes of Pouākai and Kaitake. Legend: Key for the volcanics that are shown with panning is: basalt (shades of brown/orange); monogenetic basalts; undifferentiated basalts of the Tangihua Complex in Northland Allochthon; arc basalts; arc ring basalts; dacite; andesite (shades of red); basaltic andesite; rhyolite (ignimbrite is lighter shades of violet); plutonic; White shading is selected caldera features.; Clicking on the rectangle icon enables full window and mouse-over with volcano name/wikilink and ages before present.
- Location: North Island, New Zealand
- Topo map: NZMS 169 Egmont National Park

Geology
- Rock age: 135 ka
- Mountain type: Stratovolcano
- Last eruption: 1854

Climbing
- First ascent: Ernst Dieffenbach & James Heberley, 1839
- Easiest route: Mount Taranaki Summit Track (trail)

Mount Taranaki (Māori: Taranaki Maunga), officially Taranaki Maunga and also known as Mount Egmont, is a dormant stratovolcano in the Taranaki region on the west coast of New Zealand's North Island. At 2,518 metres (8,261 ft), it is the second highest mountain in the North Island, after Mount Ruapehu. It has a secondary cone, Fanthams Peak (Māori: Panitahi), 1,966 metres (6,450 ft), on its south side.

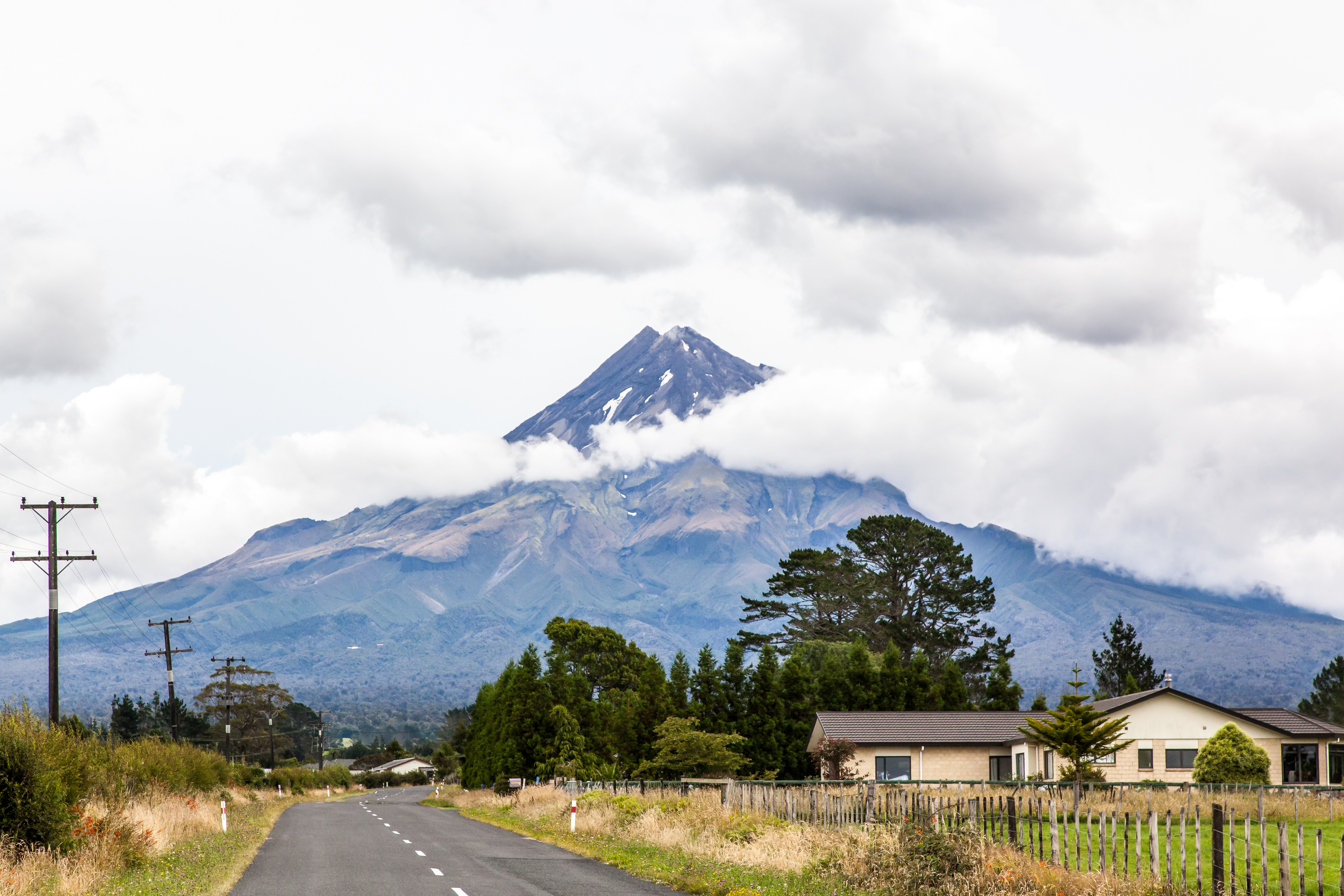
From New Plymouth

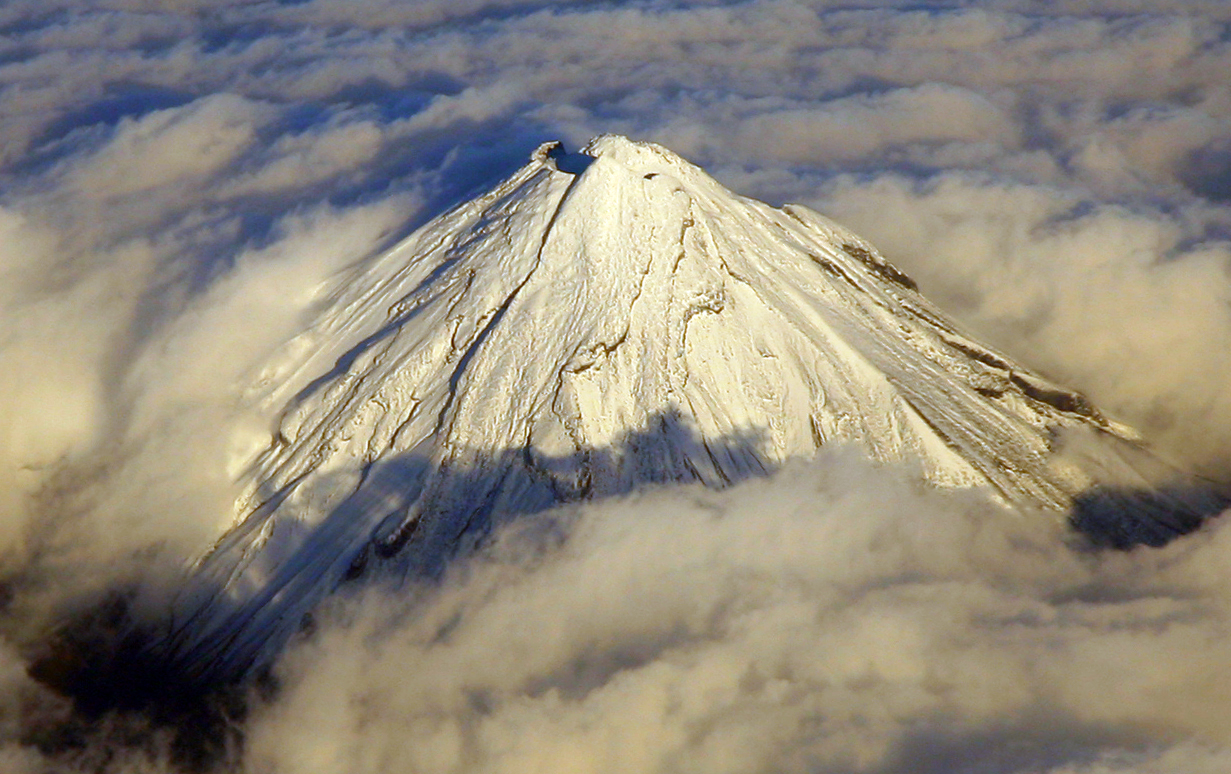
Aerial view of Mount Taranaki 2015

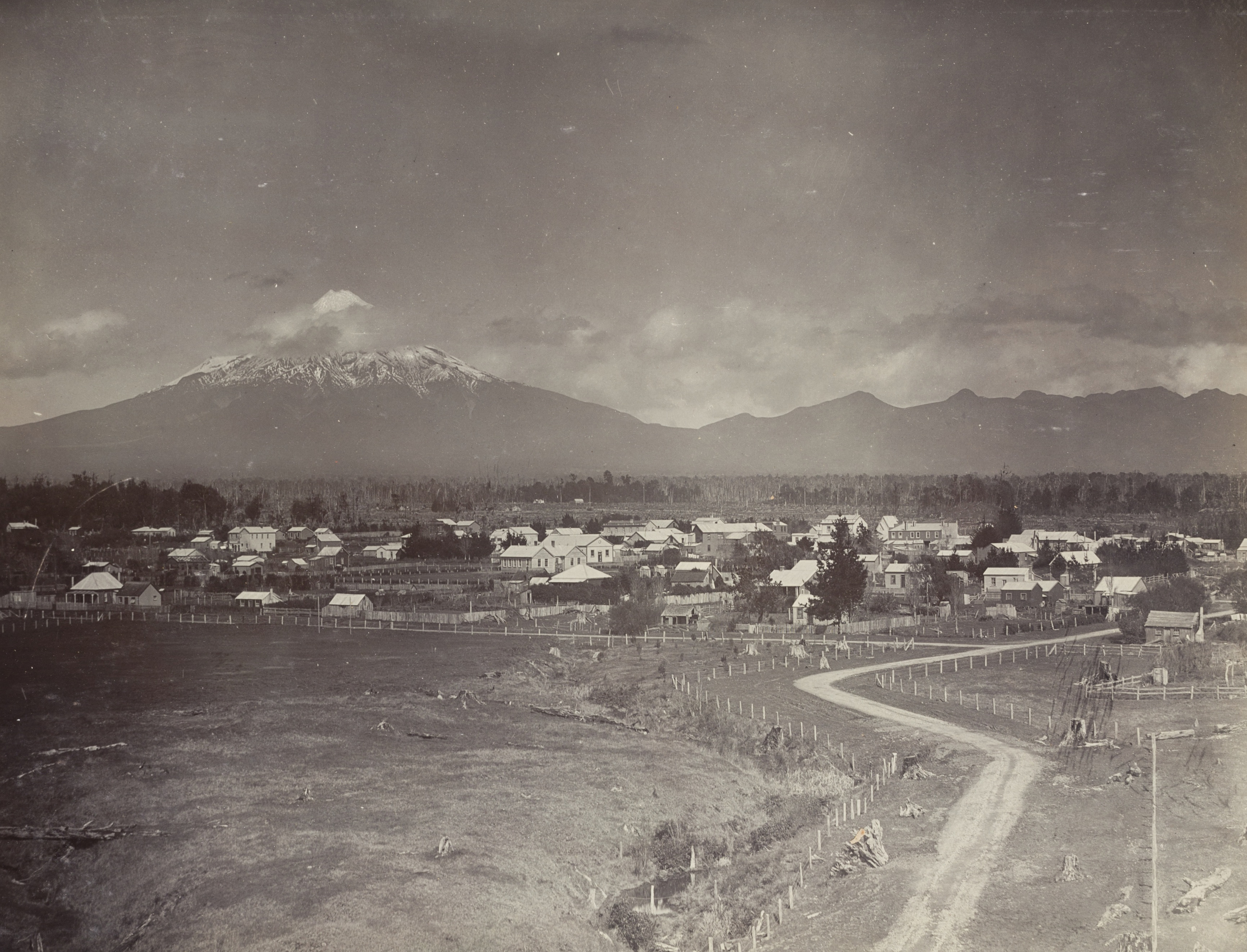
Mount Taranaki viewed from Inglewood, 1896

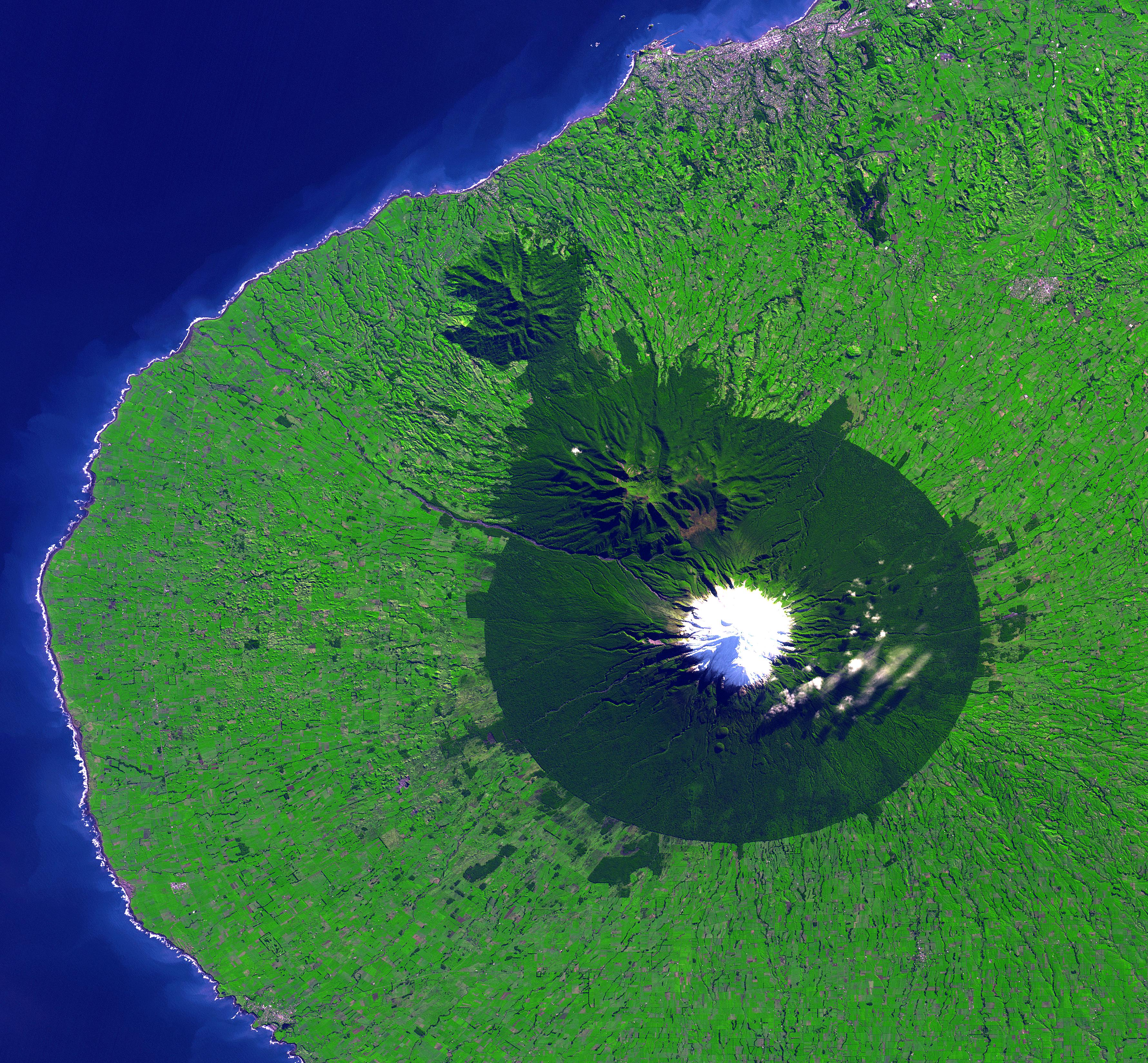
NASA satellite photo of Taranaki. The forested area matches the national park boundary fairly closely.

== Name ==
The name Taranaki is from the Māori language. The mountain was named after Rua Taranaki, the first ancestor of the iwi (tribe) called Taranaki, one of several iwi in the region. The Māori word tara means mountain peak, and naki may come from ngaki, meaning "clear of vegetation." It was also named Pukehaupapa ("ice mountain") and Pukeonaki ("hill of Naki") by iwi who lived in the region in "ancient times".

Captain James Cook named it Mount Egmont on 11 January 1770 after John Perceval, 2nd Earl of Egmont, a former First Lord of the Admiralty who had supported the concept of an oceanic search for Terra Australis Incognita. Cook described it as "of a prodigious height and its top cover'd with everlasting snow," surrounded by a "flat country ... which afforded a very good aspect, being clothed with wood and verdure".

When the French explorer Marc-Joseph Marion du Fresne saw the mountain on 25 March 1772 he named it Pic Mascarin. He was unaware of Cook's earlier visit.

It appeared as Mount Egmont on maps until 29 May 1986, when the name officially became "Mount Taranaki or Mount Egmont" following a decision by the Minister of Lands, Koro Wētere. The Egmont name no longer applies to the national park that surrounds the peak, but some geologists still refer to the peak as the Egmont Volcano.

As part of the Treaty of Waitangi settlement with Ngā Iwi o Taranaki, a group of tribes in the region, (Note: Ngā iwi o Taranaki refers literally to 'the tribes of Taranaki', and is a collective of the eight tribes, Ngaa Rauru Kiitahi, Ngāruahine, Ngāti Maru, Ngāti Mutunga, Ngāti Ruanui, Ngāti Tama, Taranaki Iwi and Te Āti Awa) the mountain was officially renamed Taranaki Maunga. The settlement was initialled on 31 March 2023, and ratified by the iwi of Taranaki. The official name changed to Taranaki Maunga on 1 April 2025.

Some iwi in the region had referred to the mountain as Taranaki Mounga rather than Taranaki Maunga, per the local Māori dialect.

== Geology ==
Mount Taranaki is situated in the sedimentary Taranaki Basin and is part of the Taranaki Volcanic Lineament which has had a 3 cm/year (1.2 in/year) north to south migration over the last 1.75 million years. A Wadati–Benioff zone exists at about 200 km (120 mi) depth, and the volcano's magma has the geochemical features of an arc volcano. Under the volcano itself there is high heat flow with only about 10 km (6.2 mi) crustal thickness although this rapidly normalises for continental crust to 35 km (22 mi) east of the volcano and 25 km (16 mi) to the west.

=== Older volcanoes in the area ===
Mount Taranaki is one of four closely associated Quaternary volcanoes in Taranaki province that have erupted from andesite magmas that have not extensively assimilated enriched crust unlike the cone volcanos of the North Island Volcanic Plateau. It sits on the remains of three older volcanic complexes that lie to the northwest. The Indo-Australian Plate is slowly moving relative to the magma source that feeds these volcanoes. This trend is reflected in Fanthams Peak, the newer secondary cone on the southeast side of Taranaki, which is named after Fanny Fantham, who in 1887 was the first European woman to climb it.

The oldest volcanic remnants consist of a series of lava plugs: Paritutu Rock (156 metres), which forms part of New Plymouth's harbour, and the Sugar Loaf Islands close offshore. These have been dated at 1.75 million years.

On the coast, 15 kilometres southwest of New Plymouth is the Kaitake Range (682 metres), last active over 500,000 years ago.

Nearest to Taranaki is the Pouākai Range. Pouākai may have originated around the same time as Kaitake but remained active until about 210,000 years ago. Much of Pouākai's large ring plain was obliterated by the Taranaki volcano, the hills near Eltham being the only remnant to the south.

=== Volcanic activity ===
Taranaki is geologically young, having commenced activity approximately 200,000 years ago. The most recent volcanic activity was the production of a lava dome in the crater and its collapse down the side of the mountain in the 1850s or 1860s. Between 1755 and 1800, an eruption sent a pyroclastic flow down the mountain's northeast flanks, and a moderate ash eruption occurred about 1755, of the size of Ruapehu's activity in 1995/1996. The last major eruption occurred around 1655. Recent research has shown that over the last 9,000 years minor eruptions have occurred roughly every 90 years on average, with major eruptions every 500 years. Some of these eruptions may have occurred with very brief warning, of only days or less. The mountain in the last 5,000 years has had 16 tephra producing events. However in the Holocene there have been at least 138 eruptions, and for about 4000 years between 23.1 and 27.3 ka BP that bracket two flank collapses had 28 tephra producing events, some with VEI greater than 4. At least 228 tephra-producing eruptions have occurred over the last 30,000 years.

=== Eruption and debris avalanches summary ===
As the volcano's major event record is so variable in time, with some major debris avalanches with edifice collapse, being associated with an increase in frequency and size of eruptions, it seems reasonable for the summary to include the full debris avalanche record. There are gaps in the ascertainable eruptive record around the start of the Holocene and little detailed study past 28,000 years ago.

Summary of eruptions and debris avalanches
Date	Years before 1950 (BP)	VEI	Debris avalanche volume (km^{3}) (Note: The large western Maitahi debris avalanche of about 240 ka is assigned to Pouakai rather than Taranaki volcano. This event does not appear to have been due to internal edifice failure but rather slipage on Pliocene marine mudstones.)	Tephra volume (km^{3})	Comment
1854	96	-	-	-	Ship's observation
1790 ± 10	160	-	-	-	Formation of current summit summit half-sectioned lava dome
1755	195	-	-	-	Tahurangi ash, date tephrochronology
1700 ± 50	250	-	-	-	
1655	295	4	-	-	Burrell lapilli, date from tephrochronology, which is part of Maero formations 19 units (Note: The Maero Formation includes 19 units erupted over about 800 years by the present summit vent.)
1590 ± 40	360	-	-	-	
1570 ± 40	380	-	-	-	
1560 ± 40	390	-	-	-	
1550 ± 40	400	-	-	-	
1500 ± 30	450	-	-	-	Newall ash which is part of Maero formations 19 units
1480 ± 50	470	-	-	-	
1400 ± 50	550	-	-	-	
1340 ± 40	610	-	-	-	
1300 ± 50	650	-	-	-	
1070 ± 40	880	-	-	-	
970 ± 30	971	-	-	-	
820 ± 30	1130	-	-	-	
550	1400	-	-	-	Kaupokonui tephra, date from tephrochronology
520 ± 150	1430	-	-	-	
390 ± 40	1560	-	-	-	
150	1800	3	-	-	Date from tephrochronology
100 ± 40	1850	-	-	-	
40 ± 75 BCE	1990	-	-	-	Maketawa tephra which has 8 layers distributed over about 400 years
150 ± 30 BCE	2100	-	-	-	
420 ± 30 BCE	2370	-	-	-	
590 ± 500 BCE	2540	-	-	-	
1130 ± 200	3080	-	-	-	Fanthams Peak (Panitahi), Manganui tephra which is a total of 7 layers distributed over about 2000 years
1190 ± 40	3140	-	-	-	
1250 BCE	3200	-	-	-	Date from tephrochronology
1560 ± 40 BCE	3510	-	-	-	
1700 ± 100 BCE	2200	5	-	-	Inglewood tephra, two layers the Lower and Upper Inglewood
2150 BCE	4100	-	-	-	Korito tephra, date from tephrochronology, has 2 layers
2400 ± 40 BCE	4350	-	-	-	
2450 ± 300 BCE	4400	-	-	-	
2700 BCE	4650	-	-	-	Tariki tephra, date from tephrochronology, has 6 layers
2850 ± 300 BCE	4800	-	-	-	
3250	5200	-	-	-	Waipuku tephra, date from tephrochronology, has single layer
5120 ± 50 BCE	7070	-	-	-	
5550 BCE	7500	-	2.4	-	Opua debris avalanche deposit
6050 BCE	8000	-	-	-	Date from tephrochronology
7000 ± 100 BCE	8950	-	-	-	Kaponga-f tephra, one of 10 layers
7270 ± 50 BCE	9220	-	-	-	
7330 BCE	9280	-	-	-	Kaponga-e tephra, date from tephrochronology, one of 10 layers
7650 BCE	9600	-	-	-	Kaponga-b tephra, date from tephrochronology, one of 10 layers
12,050 BCE	14000	-	1.0	-	Motumate debris avalanche deposit
Between 25,350 and 21,150 BCE	23100	3-4.5	-	3.0	Paetahi and Poto tephras comprise 28 tephra layers that encompass the Ngaere and Pungarehu debris avalanche events. Dating is helped by presence of a tephra layer from the Oruanui eruption of Taupo Volcano
22,850 BCE	24800	-	7.5	-	Pungarehu debris avalanche deposit
25,350 BCE	27300	-	5.85	-	Ngaere debris avalanche deposit
32,050 BCE	34000	-	2.0	-	Te Namu debris avalanche deposit - dated between 34–37 ka BP by wood
35,050 BCE	37000	-	0.2	-	Ihaia debris avalanche deposit dated by wood
38,050 BCE	40000	-	5.0	-	Rama debris avalanche deposit dated by peat above
43,050 BCE	45000	-	0.2	-	Kaupokonui debris avalanche deposit
48,050 BCE	50000	-	2.5	-	Otakeho debris avalanche deposit
58,050 BCE	60000	-	2.5	-	Tokaora debris avalanche deposit
68,050 BCE	70000	-	7.5	-	Waihi debris avalanche deposit
73,050 BCE	75000	-	5.5	-	Waingongoro debris avalanche deposit
88,050 BCE	90000	-	7.5	-	Oeo debris avalanche deposit
103,050 BCE	105000	-	3.6	-	Okawa debris avalanche deposit, age from pollen records
128,050 BCE	130000	-	4.5	-	Motunui debris avalanche deposit
198,050 BCE	200000	-	3.6	-	Mangati debris avalanche deposit

=== Hazards ===
Taranaki is unusual in that it has experienced at least five of its major eruptions by the method of cone collapse. Few volcanoes have undergone more than one cone collapse. The vast volume of material involved in these collapses is reflected in the extensive ring plain surrounding the volcano. There is also evidence of lahars being a common result of eruption. The major collapse cycles have a potential maximum size of collapse of 7.9 km^{3} (1.9 cu mi) every 30,000 to 35,000 years. Such collapse debris fields have been found up to 5–6 km (3.1–3.7 mi) beyond the coast. Another major edifice collapse is expected to occur within 16,200 years.

Much of the region is at risk from lahars, which have reached the eastern coast. A volcanic event is not necessary for a lahar: even earthquakes combined with heavy rain or snow could dislodge vast quantities of unstable layers resting on steep slopes. Many farmers live in the paths of such possible destructive events.

Although volcanic eruptions are notoriously chaotic in their frequency, some scientists warn that a large eruption is "overdue". Research from Massey University indicates that significant seismic activity from the local faults is likely again in the next 50 years and such might be permissive to an eruption. What ever in the next 50 years, the probability of at least one eruption is between 33% and 42%. Prevailing winds would probably blow ash east, covering much of the North Island, and disrupting air routes, power transmission lines and local water supplies.

== Climate ==
Climate data for North Egmont, elevation 955 m (3,133 ft), (1981–2010)
Month	Jan	Feb	Mar	Apr	May	Jun	Jul	Aug	Sep	Oct	Nov	Dec	Year
Mean daily maximum °C (°F)	16.8 (62.2)	17.2 (63.0)	15.3 (59.5)	13.1 (55.6)	10.5 (50.9)	8.0 (46.4)	7.3 (45.1)	7.8 (46.0)	9.0 (48.2)	10.8 (51.4)	12.9 (55.2)	14.8 (58.6)	12.0 (53.5)
Daily mean °C (°F)	12.7 (54.9)	13.2 (55.8)	11.6 (52.9)	9.5 (49.1)	7.4 (45.3)	5.2 (41.4)	4.4 (39.9)	4.8 (40.6)	5.8 (42.4)	7.2 (45.0)	9.2 (48.6)	11.0 (51.8)	8.5 (47.3)
Mean daily minimum °C (°F)	8.7 (47.7)	9.3 (48.7)	7.8 (46.0)	6.0 (42.8)	4.2 (39.6)	2.4 (36.3)	1.6 (34.9)	1.8 (35.2)	2.6 (36.7)	3.7 (38.7)	5.5 (41.9)	7.3 (45.1)	5.1 (41.1)
Average rainfall mm (inches)	456.8 (17.98)	380.8 (14.99)	432.0 (17.01)	480.2 (18.91)	603.1 (23.74)	653.7 (25.74)	697.6 (27.46)	694.8 (27.35)	675.7 (26.60)	809.2 (31.86)	555.4 (21.87)	589.2 (23.20)	7,028.5 (276.71)
Source: NIWA

Climate data for Stratford Mtn House, elevation 846 m (2,776 ft), (1981–2010)
Month	Jan	Feb	Mar	Apr	May	Jun	Jul	Aug	Sep	Oct	Nov	Dec	Year
Mean daily maximum °C (°F)	18.0 (64.4)	18.4 (65.1)	15.8 (60.4)	12.5 (54.5)	10.1 (50.2)	7.6 (45.7)	6.7 (44.1)	7.6 (45.7)	9.4 (48.9)	11.7 (53.1)	13.7 (56.7)	16.2 (61.2)	12.3 (54.2)
Daily mean °C (°F)	13.0 (55.4)	13.5 (56.3)	11.6 (52.9)	8.9 (48.0)	7.0 (44.6)	4.7 (40.5)	4.0 (39.2)	4.6 (40.3)	6.0 (42.8)	7.6 (45.7)	9.3 (48.7)	11.6 (52.9)	8.5 (47.3)
Mean daily minimum °C (°F)	8.0 (46.4)	8.7 (47.7)	7.4 (45.3)	5.3 (41.5)	3.9 (39.0)	1.8 (35.2)	1.2 (34.2)	1.6 (34.9)	2.6 (36.7)	3.6 (38.5)	4.9 (40.8)	7.0 (44.6)	4.7 (40.4)
Average rainfall mm (inches)	376.1 (14.81)	284.2 (11.19)	384.3 (15.13)	495.4 (19.50)	651.1 (25.63)	573.6 (22.58)	688.3 (27.10)	595.5 (23.44)	572.0 (22.52)	542.4 (21.35)	437.2 (17.21)	480.6 (18.92)	6,080.7 (239.38)
Source: NIWA

== Māori mythology ==
According to Māori mythology, Taranaki once resided in the middle of the North Island, with all the other New Zealand volcanoes. The beautiful Pihanga was coveted by all the mountains, and a great battle broke out between them. (Note: Some versions of the myth have Mount Ruapehu as the maid, instead of Pihanga.) Tongariro eventually won the day, inflicted great wounds on the side of Taranaki, and causing him to flee. Taranaki headed westwards, following Te Toka a Rahotu (the Rock of Rahotu) and forming the deep gorges of the Whanganui River, paused for a while, creating the depression that formed the Ngaere swamp, then heading north. Further progress was blocked by the Pouākai Ranges, and as the sun came up Taranaki became petrified in his current location. When Taranaki conceals himself with rainclouds, he is said to be crying for his lost love, and during spectacular sunsets, he is said to be displaying himself to her. In turn, Tongariro's eruptions are said to be a warning to Taranaki not to return.

== History ==
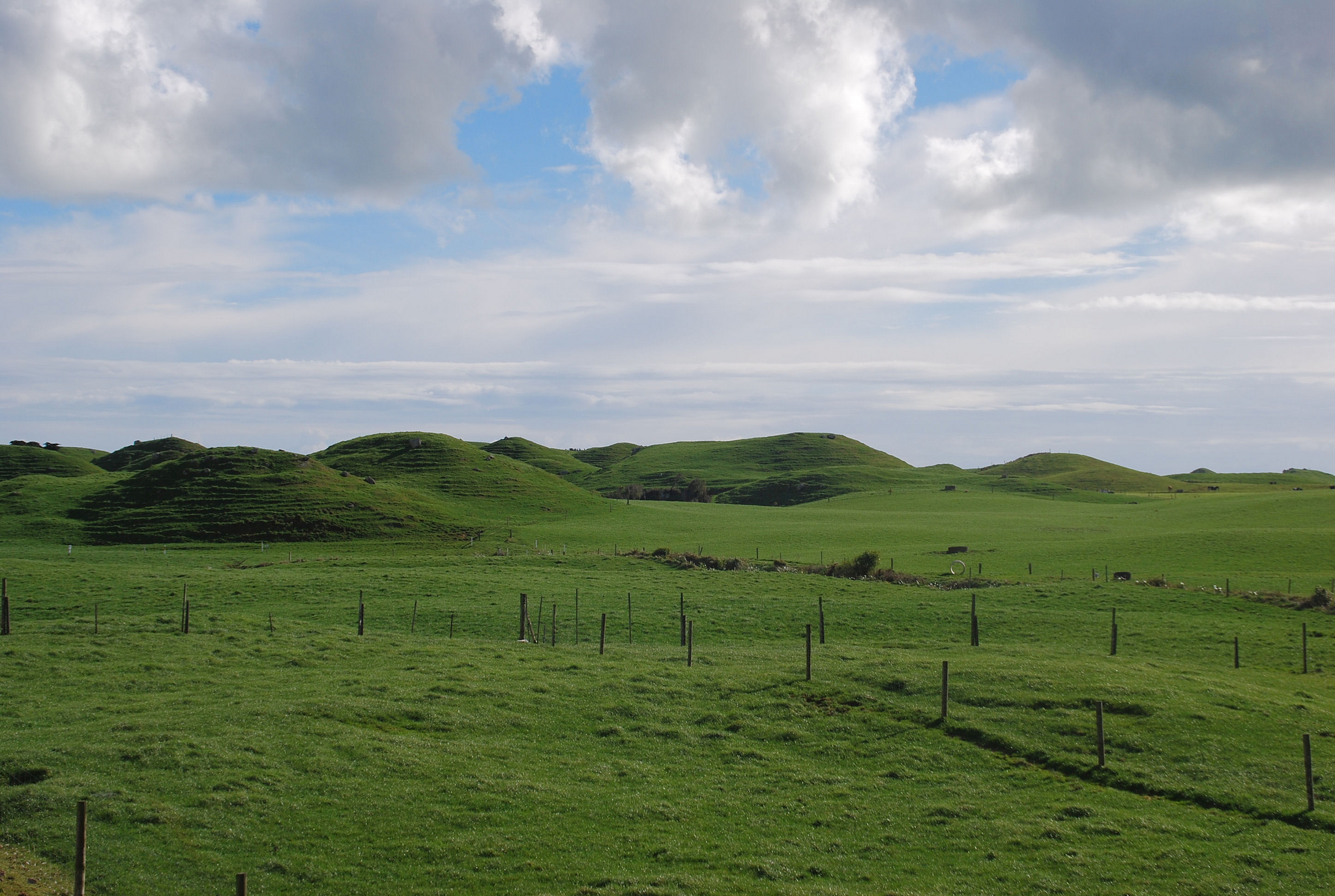
Remains from a lahar

The mountain was tapu in Māori culture and at the time of European settlement not climbed by them.

In 1839 the mountain was climbed by James Heberley, a whaler who reached the summit first, and the Swiss-trained doctor and naturalist Ernst Dieffenbach. During his initial ascent, he identified the fast-flowing streams as being well suited to water driven mills. Dieffenbach was employed by the New Zealand Company to advise on the potential of land he explored in the North Island in 1839–40.

In 1865 the mountain was confiscated from Māori by the New Zealand Government under the powers of the New Zealand Settlements Act 1863, ostensibly as a means of establishing and maintaining peace amid the Second Taranaki War. The legislation was framed with the intention of seizing and dividing up the land of Māori "in rebellion" and providing it as farmland for military settlers.

The mountain was returned to the people of Taranaki in 1978 by means of the Mount Egmont Vesting Act 1978, which vested it to the Taranaki Maori Trust Board. By means of the same Act, it was immediately passed back to the Government as a gift to the nation. The Waitangi Tribunal, in its 1996 report, Kaupapa Tuatahi, observed: "We are unaware of the evidence that the hapū agreed to this arrangement. Many who made submissions to us were adamant that most knew nothing of it." It cited a submission that suggested the political climate of 1975 was such that the board felt it was necessary to perform a gesture of goodwill designed to create a more favourable environment within which a monetary settlement could be negotiated.

Because of its resemblance to Mount Fuji, Taranaki provided the backdrop for the 2003 film The Last Samurai.

In 2017, a record of understanding was signed between Taranaki iwi and the New Zealand government that would see the mountain become a legal personality. It is the third geographic feature in the country to be granted a legal personality, after Te Urewera and Whanganui River.

On 2 December 2019, an agreement between the Crown and Ngā Iwi o Taranaki was announced that the mountain was to only be referred to as Taranaki Maunga. On 30 January 2025, the New Zealand Parliament passed legislation recognising it as a legal person under the name Taranaki Maunga, with Mount Egmont ceasing to be an official name. In addition, the Crown apologised to eight Māori iwi for confiscating Mount Taranaki and 1.2 million acres of Māori lands in the Taranaki region.

== National park ==
In 1881, a circular area with a radius of six miles (9.6 km) from the summit was protected as a forest reserve. Areas encompassing the older volcanic remnants of Pouākai and Kaitake were later added to the reserve and in 1900 all this land was designated as Egmont National Park, the second national park in New Zealand. There are parts of the national park where old-growth forests are found. With intensively-farmed dairy pasture right up to the park boundary, the change in vegetation is sharply delineated as a circular shape in satellite images.

Egmont National Park was officially renamed to Te Papa-Kura-o-Taranaki on 1 April 2025.

== Recreation ==
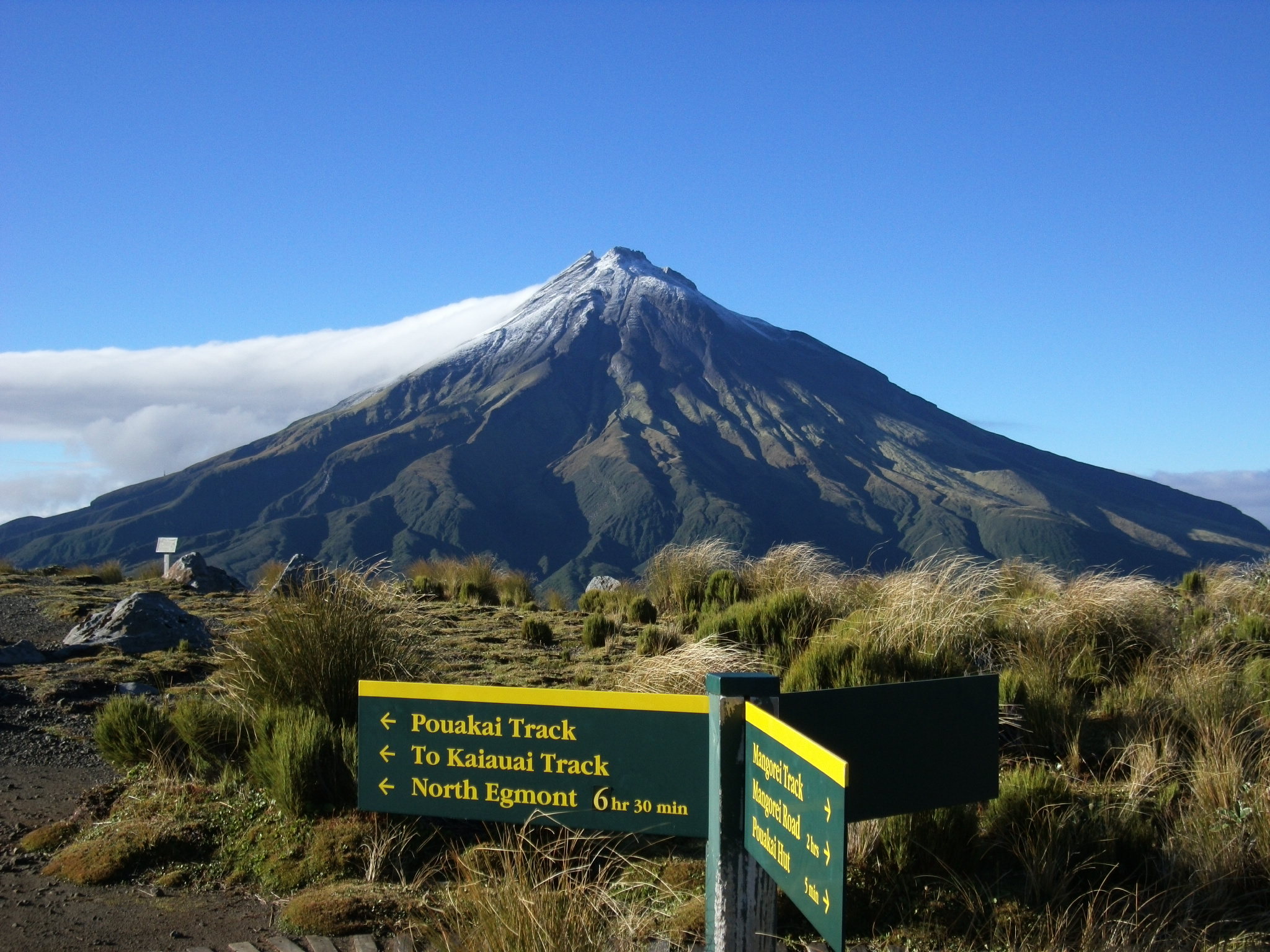
Taranaki from the Pouākai Circuit tramping track

The Stratford Mountain Club operates the Manganui skifield on the eastern slope. Equipment access to the skifield is by flying fox across the Manganui Gorge.

The Taranaki Alpine Club maintains Tahurangi Lodge on the north slope of the mountain, next to the television tower. The lodge is frequently used as the base for public climbs to the summit held in the summer months. The various climbing and tramping clubs organise these public events and provide informal guides.

Syme Hut is located near Fanthams Peak. It is maintained by the Department of Conservation and is available to trampers on a first come first served basis.

Weather on the mountain can change rapidly, which has caught inexperienced trampers and climbers unawares. As of 27 June 2017, 84 people have died on the mountain since records began in 1891, many having been caught by a sudden change in the weather. In terms of fatalities this mountain is the second most dangerous mountain in New Zealand after Aoraki / Mount Cook.

== Access ==
There are three roads on the mountain's eastern slopes that lead part-way up the mountain with many more around the foot of the mountain that access walking tracks. The highest access road reaches the East Egmont plateau, with a viewing platform and parking facilities for the skifield. It lies at the transition between subalpine scrub and alpine herbfields.

There are park visitor centres at North Egmont and at the waterfall Te Rere o Kapuni on the southeast side.

The eastern side from Stratford leads to the Stratford Mountain House, and the ski field.

There is poor road access on the western side beyond the bush line. However, a road winds for 10 km through native bush over the saddle between Pouākai and Kaitake. Near the top of this road is the renowned Pukeiti Trust rhododendron garden.

== Transmitter ==
The Mount Taranaki transmitter is the main television and FM radio transmitter for the Taranaki region. It is located on the north-eastern slope of the mountain adjacent to Tahurangi Lodge. The first transmitter at the site was commissioned by the New Zealand Broadcasting Corporation (NZBC) in 1966 to relay Wellington's WNTV1 channel (now part of TVNZ 1).

== See also ==
- List of mountains of New Zealand by height
- List of volcanoes in New Zealand
- Volcanism of New Zealand
