= David Walter (politician) =

New Zealand politician (1939–2020)

David Walter QSO JP

2nd Chair of Taranaki Regional Council
- In office 2001–2007
- Preceded by: Ross Allen
- Succeeded by: David MacLeod

1st Mayor of Stratford District
- In office 1989–1998
- Preceded by: Laurie Bond (as mayor of Stratford Borough)
- Succeeded by: Brian Jeffares

Personal details
- Born: David Ernest Walter; 25 November 1939; Stratford, New Zealand
- Died: 5 September 2020 (aged 80); New Plymouth, New Zealand
- Relatives: Edward Walter (grandfather); Neil Walter (brother); Jack Walter (uncle); Alan Smith (cousin)

David Ernest Walter QSO JP (25 November 1939 – 5 September 2020) was a New Zealand politician and journalist. He was the first mayor of Stratford District Council (1989–1998) and also served as chairman of both of the Taranaki Regional Council (2001–2007) and the Stratford County Council (1983–1989).

== Early life and family ==
Walter was born on 25 November 1939 in Straftord, the son of Anita Walter (née Frethey) and Edward Ernest Walter. He was the grandson of former County Chairman and Member of Parliament Edward Walter, brother of former diplomat Neil Walter, nephew of All Black Jack Walter, and cousin of All Black Alan Smith.

David Walter was educated at Douglas Primary School and New Plymouth Boys' High School. In 1966, he married Isabel Carryer, and the couple went on to have three children.

== Career ==
=== Journalist and historian ===
After leaving home, Walter worked as a journalist in Europe, then returned to Douglas to work as the east-Taranaki stringer for the Taranaki Daily News while working the family sheep and beef farm. He developed a knack for historical stories and human interest tales, and in 1977 accepted the role of honorary county historian, with the aim of producing a publication for the 1990 centennial. The Stratford Inheritance was published in 1990 and authored by Ian Church, with significant input from Walter's work.

=== Politics ===
In 1974 Walter was elected as a Stratford County councillor, and in 1983 was appointed chairman. He continued in this role until the County Council merged with the Stratford Borough Council to form the Stratford District Council as part of nationwide local government reforms in 1989. He played a significant role in preserving Stratford's independence when amalgamation with either the New Plymouth District Council or the South Taranaki District Council was a distinct possibility. Walter was duly elected as the first mayor of Stratford District Council, a position he held for three terms (nine years) until retiring in 1998. He reportedly originated the colloquial name for State Highway 43: the Forgotten World Highway.

After 15 years at the helm of local government and 24 years on County and District Councils, Walter moved on from territorial politics to become a Taranaki Regional Councillor. In November 2001 he replaced inaugural chairman Ross Allen and retired in 2007. Walter also played significant roles in a number of other organisations. He chaired the TSB Community Trust, served as a director of TSB Bank, and represented the Regional Council on the board of Westgate Transport Ltd.

== Honours and awards ==
In 1990, Walter was awarded the New Zealand 1990 Commemoration Medal. In the 1995 Queen's Birthday Honours, Walter was appointed a Companion of the Queen's Service Order for public services.

== Later life and death ==
Walter died of leukaemia at his home in New Plymouth, aged 80, on 5 September 2020.

== See also ==
- List of mayors of Stratford, New Zealand
- Walter, David (2019). From the Taranaki Hill Country: Memoirs of David Walter. New Plymouth: David Walter.
