= Thomas Templeton Murray =

Thomas Murray MC MM JP
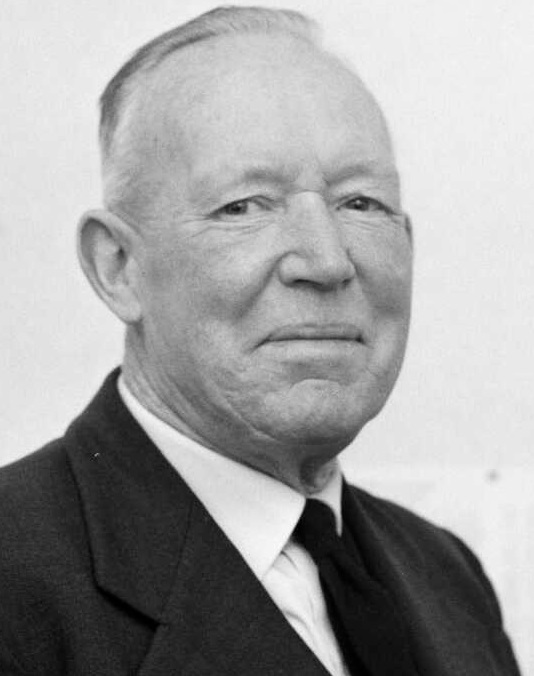
- Murray in 1959

Member of the New Zealand Parliament for Stratford
- In office 13 November 1954 – 30 November 1963
- Preceded by: In abeyance (last held by William Polson)
- Succeeded by: David Thomson

Personal details
- Born: 20 November 1891 Largs, Scotland
- Died: 28 July 1966 (aged 74) Stratford, New Zealand
- Party: National
- Profession: Farmer

Thomas Templeton Murray MC MM JP (20 November 1891 – 28 July 1966) was a New Zealand politician of the National Party.

== Biography ==
New Zealand Parliament
Years	Term	Electorate	Party
1954–1957	31st	Stratford	National
1957–1960	32nd	Stratford	National
1960–1963	33rd	Stratford	National

Murray was born in Largs, Scotland, in 1891, and he received his education in his home country. He came to New Zealand in c. 1910. During World War I he served in the New Zealand Expeditionary Force and was awarded the Military Cross and Military Medal for his actions. After the conclusion of World War I he took up a soldier resettlement farm in Huiroa. His farm performed well and he was able to use profits to purchase a second farm in Toko in 1928.

He was involved in community affairs as a justice of the peace, Stratford Borough Councillor, chairman of the Taranaki Education Board and Licensing Authority as well as president of Federated Farmers. He supported the establishment of the National Party and founded the Stratford electoral division of the National Party, also being electorate chairman from 1936 to 1939.

In 1939 he rejoined the army and served in World War II. By the close of the war he had reached the rank of colonel.

He represented the Stratford electorate from 1954, and he retired in 1963. David Thomson succeeded him in Stratford.

Murray died on 28 July 1966, and he was buried at Kopuatama Cemetery, Stratford.

== Notes ==
New Zealand Parliament
In abeyance Title last held by William Polson	Member of Parliament for Stratford; 1954–1963	Succeeded by David Thomson
