= Robert Masters (New Zealand politician) =

New Zealand politician

The Honourable Robert Masters CMG
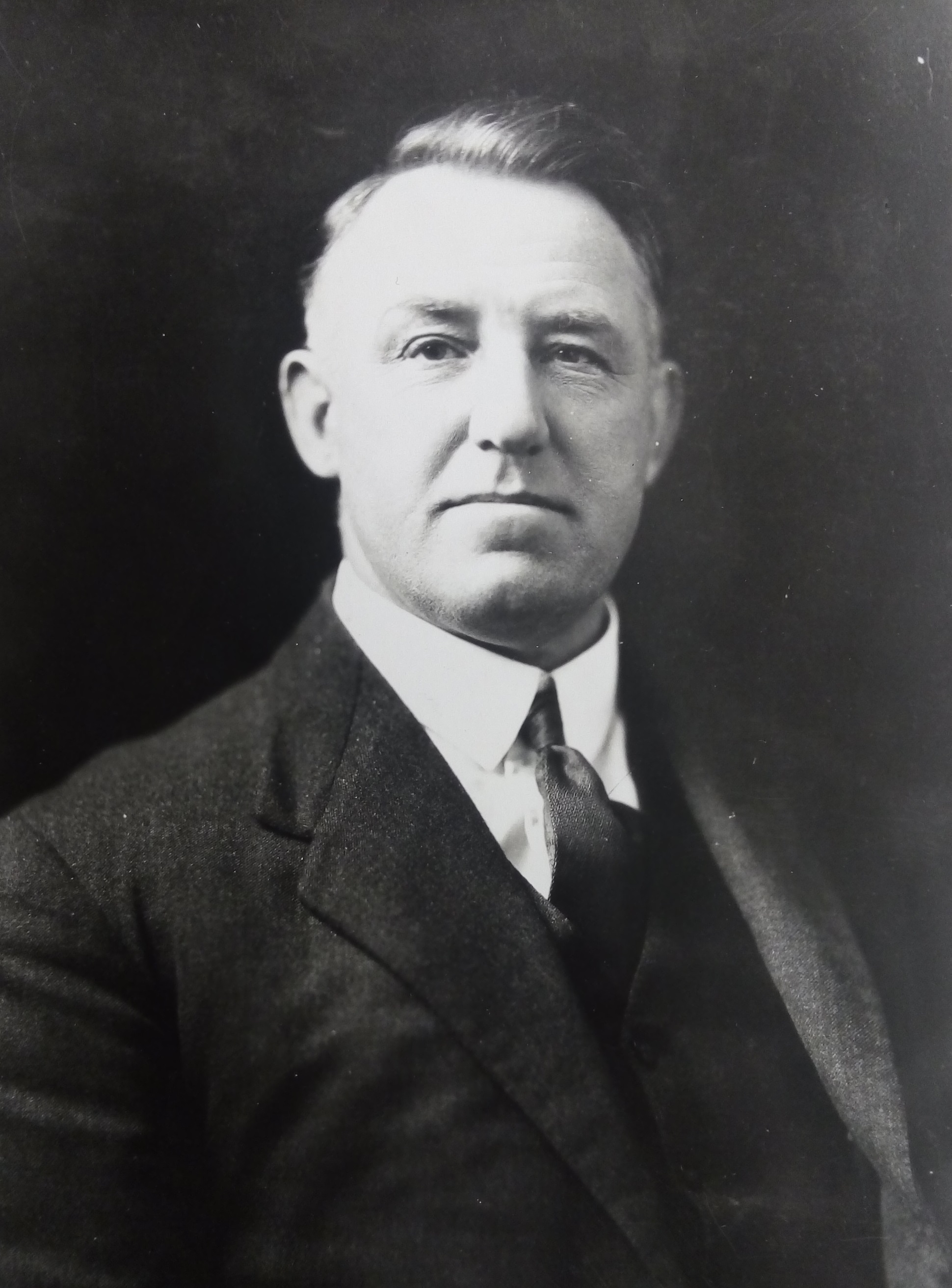

14th Minister of Industries and Commerce
- In office 22 September 1931 – 6 December 1935
- Prime Minister: George Forbes
- Preceded by: Philip De La Perrelle
- Succeeded by: Dan Sullivan

20th Minister of Education
- In office 22 September 1931 – 22 November 1934
- Prime Minister: George Forbes
- Preceded by: Harry Atmore
- Succeeded by: Sydney George Smith

Member of the Legislative Council
- In office 11 June 1930 – 10 June 1937
- Appointed by: George Forbes

Member of the New Zealand Parliament for Stratford
- In office 17 December 1919 – 4 November 1925
- Preceded by: John Bird Hine
- Succeeded by: Edward Walter

Personal details
- Born: 15 June 1879 Greymouth, New Zealand
- Died: 29 June 1967 (aged 88) Stratford, New Zealand
- Party: United Party (after 1928)
- Other political affiliations: Liberal (until 1928)
- Spouse: Alice Gertrude Hopkins (m. 1906; died 1962)
- Children: 3
- Occupation: Retailer

Robert Masters CMG (15 June 1879 – 29 June 1967) was a New Zealand politician of the Liberal and later United parties, as well as a cabinet minister.

== Biography ==
=== Early life and career ===
Masters was born in 1879 at Greymouth and was educated at Greymouth Boys' College. Around 1896 he moved to Stratford where he became a storekeeper with his father, Jonas Masters. He played representative rugby, and later, was a member of the Taranaki Rugby Football Union, executive. Masters was also a member of the executive of the Stratford Chamber of Commerce. On 3 May 1906 he was married to Alice Gertrude Hopkins in Stratford. Interested in agricultural matters, he was a member of Stratford's Agricultural and pastoral Association of which he had been both president and treasurer. He helped set up the Stratford model farm and later a member of its executive. Masters was chairman of directors of the Stratford Electric Lighting Company, until it entered the ownership of the Stratford Borough Council.

=== Political career ===
New Zealand Parliament
Years	Term	Electorate	Party
1919–1920	20th	Stratford	Liberal
1920–1922	20th	Stratford	Liberal
1922–1925	21st	Stratford	Liberal

Masters entered politics via local government. In 1916 he was elected a member of the Taranaki Board of Education, and became its chairman by the end of the same year.

Masters represented the Taranaki electorate of Stratford from 1919 for the Liberal Party; though the result was declared void in the following year, he won the subsequent 1920 by-election. Masters was a personal friend of Liberal Party leader George Forbes and the two went for daily walks together. He took on a mentoring role with Forbes for which he was mockingly dubbed 'His Master's Voice'. He was defeated by Edward Walter in 1925. After losing his seat he remained politically active and was involved in setting up the United Party, which succeeded the Liberal Party in 1928. Notably he was the chairman of the September 1928 convention in Wellington that launched the party's formal existence, decided its policies and where delegates elected former Prime Minister Sir Joseph Ward as its leader. He also negotiated successfully to bring about co-operation with several independent MPs and candidates (such as Harry Atmore, William Polson and Charles Wilkinson) to support the United Party in the house.

Masters was appointed to the New Zealand Legislative Council on 11 June 1930 and served for one seven-year term. When Ward retired as Prime Minister his successor, Forbes, added Masters to the cabinet on 20 August 1930 as a Minister without portfolio. In the Forbes Ministry, he was a Member of the Executive Council without portfolio from 1930 to 1931. When the United and Reform Party decided on entering in to a coalition, Forbes relied on Masters heavily for support during the tense negotiations that created the United-Reform Coalition government in 1931. In the coalition government, he was both Minister of Education and Minister of Industries and Commerce. At the 1931 election he was the United Party's campaign chairman. He was frequently called on to resolve selection disputes as part of the coalition agreement with Reform was to not oppose each others MPs. He had to work with the Reform leadership to make sure that in as many electorates as possible there was only one "anti-Labour" candidate to avoid vote splitting.

In 1935, Masters was awarded the King George V Silver Jubilee Medal. In the 1953 Coronation Honours, he was appointed a Companion of the Order of St Michael and St George, for public services.

=== Later life and death ===
In 1957 he was appointed to the Electricity and Gas Co-ordination Board by the first National government. He was also the patron of the New Zealand Federation of Wholesale Hardware Guilds.

He died in Stratford on 29 June 1967, aged 88. His wife had predeceased him on 27 May 1962.

== Notes ==
New Zealand Parliament
Preceded by John Bird Hine	Member of Parliament for Stratford; 1919–1925	Succeeded by Edward Walter
Political offices
Preceded by Harry Atmore	Minister of Education; 1931–1934	Succeeded by Sydney Smith
Preceded by Philip De La Perrelle	Minister of Industries and Commerce; 1931–1935	Succeeded by Dan Sullivan
