= Stratford (New Zealand electorate) =

Stratford is a former parliamentary electorate, in Taranaki, New Zealand. It existed from 1908 to 1946, and from 1954 to 1978. It was represented by six Members of Parliament.

== Population centres ==
In the 1907 electoral redistribution, a major change that had to be allowed for was a reduction of the tolerance to ±750 to those electorates where the country quota applied. The North Island had once again a higher population growth than the South Island, and three seats were transferred from south to north. In the resulting boundary distribution, every existing electorate was affected, and three electorates were established for the first time, including the Stratford electorate. These changes took effect with the 1908 election.

The electorate was mixed urban and rural, with the town of Stratford located near the electorate's southern boundary. In the 1908 election, the rural / urban split for the country quote was a ratio of 4 to 1, and it more or less held this ratio until the country quota was abolished. In the 1918 electoral redistribution, the town of Inglewood was gained from the adjacent Taranaki electorate. In the 1927 electoral redistribution, the electorate was not landlocked any longer for the first time, but gained the North Taranaki Bight coastline from just east of Waitara to the Mokau River, and the settlement of Mokau was thus gained.

The Electoral Amendment Act 1945 abolished the country quote, and this was implemented through the 1946 electoral redistribution, which saw a reduction in the number of rural electorates, and an increase in their size. Many electorates were abolished, including Stratford, and its area was subsumed in the enlarged Waitomo electorate.

The First Labour Government was defeated in the 1949 election and the incoming National Government changed the Electoral Act, with the electoral quota once again based on total population as opposed to qualified electors, and the tolerance was increased to 7.5% of the electoral quota. There was no adjustments in the number of electorates between the South and North Islands, but the law changes resulted in boundary adjustments to almost every electorate through the 1952 electoral redistribution; only five electorates were unaltered. Five electorates were reconstituted (including Stratford) and one was newly created, and a corresponding six electorates were abolished; all of these in the North Island. These changes took effect with the 1954 election.

== History ==
The electorate existed from 1908 to 1946, and from 1954 to 1978. The first representative was the conservative politician John Bird Hine, who defeated Walter Symes of the Liberal Party. Symes had held the Patea electorate from 1902 election to 1908, which then included the town of Stratford.

Hine joined the Reform Party when it established itself in 1909. In the 1919 election, Hine was defeated by Robert Masters of the Liberal Party. The 1919 election was declared void, but Masters won the resulting 1920 by-election.

=== Members of Parliament ===
The Stratford electorate was represented by six Members of Parliament:

Key

Independent Reform Liberal National

Election	Winner
1908 election	John Bird Hine
1911 election	John Bird Hine
1914 election	John Bird Hine
1919 election^{1}	Robert Masters
1920 by-election	Robert Masters
1922 election	Robert Masters
1925 election	Edward Walter
1928 election	William Polson
1931 election	William Polson
1935 election	William Polson
1938 election	William Polson
1943 election	William Polson
(electorate abolished 1946–1954)
1954 election	Thomas Murray
1957 election	Thomas Murray
1960 election	Thomas Murray
1963 election	David Thomson
1966 election	David Thomson
1969 election	David Thomson
1972 election	David Thomson
1975 election	David Thomson
(Electorate abolished in 1978)

^{1}Robert Masters was elected in 1919; the election was declared void but Masters was elected in the subsequent 1920 by-election

== Election results ==
=== 1943 election ===
1943 general election: Stratford
Party	Candidate	Votes	%	±%
National	William Polson	5,327	59.31	+3.83
Labour	Brian Richmond	3,268	36.38	
Democratic Labour	A G Marwick	297	3.30	
Informal votes		89	0.99	+0.36
Majority		2,059	22.92	+11.32
Turnout		8,981	95.39	+2.05
Registered electors		9,415		

=== 1938 election ===
1938 general election: Stratford
Party	Candidate	Votes	%	±%
National	William Polson	5,264	55.48	+6.58
Labour	James Watson McMillan	4,163	43.88	
Informal votes		60	0.63	−0.08
Majority		1,101	11.60	+7.87
Turnout		9,487	93.34	+4.01
Registered electors		10,163		

=== 1935 election ===
1935 general election: Stratford
Party	Candidate	Votes	%	±%
Independent	William Polson	4,434	48.90	+6.40
Labour	Philip Skoglund	4,095	45.16	
Democrat	C R Finnerty	538	5.93	
Informal votes		65	0.71	+0.32
Majority		339	3.73	−14.42
Turnout		9,067	89.33	+2.52
Registered electors		10,149		

=== 1931 election ===
1931 general election: Stratford
Party	Candidate	Votes	%	±%
Independent	William Polson	3,554	42.50	−13.48
Independent Reform	James Watson McMillan (Note: McMillan claimed to stand for the Reform Party, but he was not the official candidate, as the United–Reform Coalition endorsed William Polson, who ran as an independent)	2,036	24.35	
Independent	Norman Harold Moss	1,471	17.59	
Labour	Charles Croall	1,301	15.56	
Informal votes		33	0.39	−0.30
Majority		1,518	18.15	+6.18
Turnout		8,395	86.81	−4.39
Registered electors		9,670		

Table footnotes:

=== 1928 election ===
1928 general election: Stratford
Party	Candidate	Votes	%	±%
Independent	William Polson	4,592	55.99	
Reform	Edward Walter	3,610	44.01	
Informal votes		57	0.69	
Majority		982	11.97	
Turnout		8,259	91.21	
Registered electors		9,055		

=== 1920 by-election ===
1920 Stratford by-election
Party	Candidate	Votes	%	±%
Liberal	Robert Masters	3,394	51.12	
Reform	John Bird Hine	3,246	48.88	
Majority		148	2.22	
Turnout		6,640		
Liberal hold		Swing		
