= Alexander Walker Reid =

New Zealand farmer, inventor, and entrepreneur (1853–1938)

Alexander Walker Reid JP (14 September 1853 – 21 November 1938) was a 19th-century New Zealand farmer, inventor, and entrepreneur. He was notable for making Stratford the second or third New Zealand town to have an electricity supply, for constructing the first steam-powered motor car in the country, and for creating an innovative milking machine.

== Family ==
Reid was born in Glasgow, Scotland, on 14 September 1853. His parents were Alexander Reid, a carter, and Helen Reid. The family emigrated to New Zealand in 1860, arriving at Lyttelton on the William Miles on 21 August. They took up farming at Southbridge and later moved to Springfield. Reid is thought to have possibly been trained as an apprentice by Scott Brothers in Christchurch. On 28 June 1876 Reid married Janet Whyte at Christchirch and moved to Ōpunake in 1882. Reid bought land on Bird Road, Ngaere, which he farmed. From about 1898 they lived in Stratford. The Reids had seven children. He was described as a hard man and a perfectionist. Reid was also a reasonably good photographer with many of his photos now in the Puke Ariki collection.

Janet Reid died on 13 November 1918, an early victim of the influenza epidemic. On 26 March 1926, at Wharehuia near Stratford, Reid married a widow, Ellen Anne Richmond. Reid died at Stratford on 21 November 1938.

== Civic affairs ==
Reid took served as a justice of the peace, a member of the Ngaire Road Board, and a Councillor on the Stratford County Council. He was involved in forming a cooperative dairy packing company and the opening of the Waitara Freezing Works. Reid was a Freemason and the first master of the Stratford lodge. He was a grand lodge officer.

== Inventor and entrepreneur ==
In Canterbury Reid went into partnership operating a threshing machine which he had modified.

=== Electricity supply ===
He was instrumental in bringing electricity to Stratford, demonstrating electric lighting and cooking to the Stratford Town Board when they were considering installing either gas or electricity. Reid had joined with Adam Porter of Cardiff to put on the display and make a proposal to the council in opposition to a Mr Watt from Balclutha who had proposed a water gas system. The Taranaki Herald's local agent wrote against the Reid/Porter proposal.

Reid's proposal to supply electricity to the town prevailed and, after arranging financial backing, he formed the Stratford Electrical Supply Company in 1898. An act of Parliament was required to allow a private companies to supply electricity. Stratford was the third town in New Zealand, after Reefton in 1887 and Wellington in 1888, to have electric street lighting. Straford went live in 1890.

The company built a hydroelectric power station on the Pātea River. It consisted of a wooden dam and a tunnel approximately 100 yards long complete with a surge chamber. Two penstocks led water to turbines driving alternators which had been imported from England. The plant produced single-phase alternating current at 40 cycles and 2,200 volts, and had a capacity of 90 kilowatts. In town the voltage was reduced to 105 volts for domestic consumption. Parts of the installations remain.

=== Steam-powered vehicles ===
Reid next turned his attention to self-propelled vehicles. Between 1903 and 1906 he produced three steam-driven cars. The engines and boilers were imported from America, with modifications and bodywork completed in Stratford. The cars were two-cylinder, chain-driven and powered by kerosene, and had a rating of about four horsepower. Before general vehicle registration was introduced Reid's personal car carried the number plate SD1 (Stratford District 1). He stopped working on the cars' development as he thought petrol engines were more likely. He sold two of the cars and kept one for himself.

James Livingston of Patea owned one of the first Reid cars. Its steam engine ran on a small primus burner under a tank of water. When Livingston bought a Darracq in 1904 the Reid was destroyed. Its engine was removed and used by a local farmer to run a pump, and the chassis was converted into a trailer. The trailer was sold in the 1920s or '30s.

=== Milking machine ===
At the same time he was producing his steam cars, Reid was also developing a mechanical milking machine. Innovations included were a variable-speed pulsator and rubber cups with reinforced sections which simulated the natural sucking action of a calf. Mechanical milkers of the time were difficult to clean and therefore created a danger of contaminated milk. Reid's AWR machine was designed to be easy to clean. He founded the AWR Milking Machine Company Limited to produce and market the machine. He also had it patented. The first AWR machines came on the market in about 1907 and were sold as far away as Australia. The application for a patent for his machine was challenged in Australia in 1913 with the Commissioner of Patents. Reid was granted a hearing.

=== "Pop top" caravan ===
In his later years, Reid created his own caravan. His first was a pop-top in which one pulled a rope, the top came up and the sides came down. The next was made from a hardboard-like material.
