= Doris Gordon =

New Zealand doctor and obstetrician

Doris Clifton Gordon MBE FRCSE FRCOG
- Born: Doris Clifton Jolly; 10 July 1890; Melbourne, Victoria, Australia
- Died: 9 July 1956 (aged 65)
- Education: University of Otago
- Medical career
- Profession: obstetrician, academic

Doris Clifton Gordon MBE FRCSE FRCOG (10 July 1890 – 9 July 1956) was a New Zealand doctor, obstetrician, university lecturer and women's health reformer. She was known as 'Dr Doris', famous for her work in rural general practice, for raising the status of obstetrics, improving obstetrics education of medical students and doctors, and working for the welfare of mothers and children.

== Early life ==
Doris Clifton Jolly was born in Melbourne, Victoria, Australia on 10 July 1890 emigrating with her family to New Zealand in 1894. The family lived in Wellington and Tapanui where she attended Tapanui High School. She received little primary school education and completed her secondary education in just over one year after deciding to become a medical missionary. She entered medical school at the University of Otago in 1911, graduating in 1916.

== Career ==
On graduation Gordon became a house surgeon at Dunedin Hospital. In 1917 she lectured at the University of Otago, qualified with a Diploma in Public Health and married fellow medical graduate William (Bill) Patteson Pollock Gordon. She decided early in her career to devote herself to country practice. After doing locum work, she and Bill settled in Stratford, Taranaki in 1919 where they ran a general practice and a small private hospital Marire. She became known as 'Dr Doris', synonymous with 'back blocks' (i.e. rural) practice, later publishing two volumes of her autobiography, Backblocks baby-doctor and Doctor down under.

Gordon was devoted to midwifery care, in particular safe, pain free childbirth. She pioneered anaesthesia in childbirth or 'twilight sleep' using morphine and scopolamine, as well as Caesarian sections. She gained an MD in 1924 with her thesis entitled Scopolamine – Morphine Narcosis in Childbirth.

During the 1920s and 1930s Gordon led the medical profession's struggle with the Department of Health for control of obstetrics. She believed all births should take place in hospital and that mothers should be supervised by medical practitioners during pregnancy and postnatally. In 1927 she founded the New Zealand Obstetrical Society (which became the New Zealand Obstetrical and Gynaecological Society (NZOGS) in 1935) and was its secretary for many years. The Society promoted its aims for better recognition of the practice of obstetrics through meetings, lecture tours, scholarships and liaison with the Department of Health. Its view was that births should be attended by a doctor and midwife or doctor and maternity nurse rather than the midwifery led system for births as doctors were needed to administer pain relief. While she had been opposed to state control in medicine and midwifery she applauded the Labour government's midwifery service introduced in 1938. The service included free hospital deliveries and 14 days' rest in hospital after the birth.

Gordon's commitment to the care of women and children broadened to raising the status of obstetrics and improving education of medical students and young specialists by establishing a chair in obstetrics at the University of Otago and postgraduate training. In 1930–31 she raised money for an endowment to establish a chair in obstetrics at Otago Medical School in 1932. In 1938 the Queen Mary Hospital in Dunedin opened providing obstetrical training for medical students.

Gordon saw the need for effective postgraduate training in obstetrics and the need to bring overseas trained New Zealand specialists back to the country. The NZOGS had been awarding scholarships for postgraduate training and advocating for a hospital to provide postgraduate training. Gordon commenced lobbying for better training at the Royal College of Obstetrics and Gynaecology Meeting in London in 1939 by enlisting support from expatriates John Stallworthy, Robert Hawksworth and Robert Macintosh. After an NZOGS meeting in 1940 Gordon found an ally in her quest in Douglas Robb and support from women's organisations including the National Council of Women. Arguments for postgraduate training and a dedicated hospital included the inability of Queen Mary Hospital to train undergraduates as well as postgraduates, the need to provide training in New Zealand because of the war and to attract overseas trained specialists back to the country. A Postgraduate School of Obstetrics and Gynaecology was set up at Auckland University College in 1947, based initially at Cornwall Hospital and then at National Women's Hospital from 1964.

From 1946–1948 Gordon became Director of Maternal and Infant Welfare in the Health Department.

== Awards ==
In 1925 she became the first woman in Australasia to gain a fellowship of the Royal College of Surgeons of Edinburgh (FRCSE). She was elected to the Royal College of Obstetricians and Gynaecologists (FRCOG) in 1936, becoming an honorary fellow of the college in 1954. She was the only woman to receive this honour and the only recipient in the Southern Hemisphere. In the 1935 King's Birthday Honours, she was appointed a Member of the Order of the British Empire.

== Personal life ==
Doris and Bill Gordon had one daughter and three sons. Their daughter trained as a nurse, two sons Ross Gordon and Graham Gordon became doctors, and their other son Peter Gordon was a politician and cabinet minister.

Gordon died in Marire Hospital on 9 July 1956.

== Legacy ==
Gordon campaigned throughout her career for the welfare of mothers and children. She firmly believed in motherhood as women's destiny and the need for women to be content with their maternal lot by making them happy in pregnancy and easing the pain of childbirth. She wished to “reconsecrate” motherhood and campaigned against abortion. Douglas Robb paid tribute to her energy and tenacity to achieve her goals.

Gordon's views on contraception and abortion have been criticised by Margaret Sparrow, a New Zealand reproductive rights advocate and doctor. Sparrow wrote that Gordon's upbringing and personal beliefs meant that she did not challenge the medical profession's negative views of contraception and abortion. She did not accept the advantages of preventing unplanned pregnancies and how birth control could improve the lives of ordinary women. She approved of contraception only if medically necessary, not for economic reasons. But she did advocate for sterilisation for women with poor health who had already had multiple pregnancies. In Sparrow's view her attitudes were pronatalist, racist and eugenicist and disapproving of the emancipation of women. Gordon co-authored a book, with anaesthetist and physician Francis Bennett, Gentlemen of the Jury opposing indiscriminate contraception and abortion, though Bennett later distanced himself from the publication.

In June 1961 the Obstetrical and Gynaecological Society (O&G Society) and the National Council of Women (NCW) established the Doris Gordon Memorial Trust and Fund to commemorate Gordon's work and to further the study and teaching and practice of obstetrics and gynaecology. In 1963 Robert Hawksworth gave the First Doris Gordon Memorial Oration in New Plymouth. During the 1990s, when maternity care was transferred from general practitioners to midwives, the O&G Society and Doris Gordon Memorial Trust became inactive but the Trust Fund remained.

In 2015 the Royal Australian and New Zealand College of Obstetricians and Gynaecologists and NCW formed a new Doris Gordon Memorial Trust to use the funds for an annual Doris Gordon Memorial Lecture. The inaugural lecture in 1915 was a eulogy to Gordon delivered by Professor Ron Jones. Margaret Sparrow reiterated her view that while Gordon had achieved much for the advancement of maternity services her legacy is flawed and that by opposing contraception and safe legal abortion she had held back advances made to women in England, Europe and America.

A street in the Wellington suburb of Crofton Downs is named Doris Gordon Crescent to commemorate Gordon's residence near Crofton Downs when her family first arrived in Wellington.

Archives of Gordon's papers and the architect's plans for Marire Hospital are held by Puke Ariki in New Plymouth.

== Selected publications ==
- 'Further problems of obstetrics.' New Zealand Medical Journal, Vol. 25, p.267-287. (1926)
- 'Obstetrical hospital, history of the movement' NZ Countrywoman, 1 no. 9.(20 Jan 1934)
- 'Modern problems in maternal welfare in New Zealand, Part II: the abortion evil'. New Zealand Nursing Journal (15 January 1937)
- Backblocks baby doctor (1955)
- Doctor down under (1958) - published posthumously
