= Shadow Cabinet of Jack Marshall =

New Zealand shadow cabinet (1972–1974)

New Zealand political leader Jack Marshall assembled a "shadow cabinet" within the National Party caucus after his change to the position of Leader of the Opposition in 1972. He composed this of individuals who acted for the party as spokespeople in assigned roles while he was Leader of the Opposition (1972–74). As the National Party formed the largest party not in government at the time, the frontbench team was as a result the Official Opposition within the New Zealand House of Representatives.

Marshall made the choice to not separate the shadow cabinet from the rest of the caucus to foster party unity. Likewise he made the choice to highlight both National's experience and stability by making minimal changes to his lineup from February 1972. He did not allocate portfolios held by defeated MP Duncan MacIntyre (Maori Affairs, Lands and Environment) or retired MP Lorrie Pickering (Education). Defeated MP Hugh Templeton continued as a member and the secretary of the National caucus, he was given membership by virtue of his new role as Marshall's executive assistant.

== Frontbench team ==
The list below contains a list of Marshall's shadow ministers and their respective roles.

Rank	Shadow Minister	Portfolio
1	Rt Hon Jack Marshall	Leader of the Opposition; Shadow Minister of State Services
2	Hon Robert Muldoon	Deputy Leader of the Opposition; Shadow Minister of Finance
3	Hon Brian Talboys	Shadow Minister of Trade and Industry; Shadow Minister of Overseas Trade
4	Hon Peter Gordon	Shadow Minister of Transport; Shadow Minister of Railways; Shadow Minister of Marine
5	Hon David Thomson	Shadow Minister of Labour; Shadow Minister of Immigration
6	Hon Lance Adams-Schneider	Shadow Minister of Health; Shadow Minister of Social Welfare
7	Hon Percy Allen	Shadow Minister of Works; Shadow Minister of Police
8	Hon Douglas Carter	Shadow Minister of Agriculture; Shadow Minister of Fisheries
9	Rt Hon Sir Keith Holyoake	Shadow Minister of Foreign Affairs
10	Hon Sir Roy Jack	Shadow Minister of Justice; Shadow Attorney-General
11	Hon Allan McCready	Shadow Minister of Defence
12	Hon Bert Walker	Shadow Postmaster-General; Shadow Minister of Broadcasting; Shadow Minister of Tourism
13	Hon George Gair	Shadow Minister of Customs
14	Hon Les Gandar	Shadow Minister of Science; Shadow Minister of Energy; Shadow Minister of Mines
15	Hon Eric Holland	Shadow Minister of Housing
16	Hon Allan Highet	Shadow Minister of Internal Affairs; Shadow Minister of Local Government
17	Harry Lapwood	Senior Whip
18	Colin McLachlan	Junior Whip
