= First Shadow Cabinet of Robert Muldoon =

New Zealand shadow cabinet (1974–1975)

New Zealand political leader Robert Muldoon assembled a "shadow cabinet" within the National Party caucus after his election to the position of Leader of the Opposition in 1974. He composed this of individuals who acted for the party as spokespeople in assigned roles while he was Leader of the Opposition (1974–75).

As the National Party formed the largest party not in government at the time, the frontbench team was as a result the Official Opposition within the New Zealand House of Representatives.

== Frontbench team ==
The list below contains a list of Muldoon's shadow ministers and their respective roles.

Rank	Shadow Minister	Portfolio
1	Hon Robert Muldoon	Leader of the Opposition; Shadow Minister of Finance
2	Hon Brian Talboys	Deputy Leader of the Opposition; Shadow Minister of National Development
3	Hon Peter Gordon	Shadow Minister of Labour; Shadow Minister of State Services
4	Hon Lance Adams-Schneider	Shadow Minister of Trade & Industry; Shadow Minister of Commerce
5	Hon David Thomson	Shadow Minister of Justice; Shadow Minister of Police; Shadow Minister of Immigration
6	Hon George Gair	Shadow Minister of Housing
7	Hon Les Gandar	Shadow Minister of Education; Shadow Minister of Science & Technology
8	Frank Gill	Shadow Minister of Health; Shadow Minister of Social Welfare; Shadow Minister of Superannuation
9	Rt Hon Sir Keith Holyoake	Shadow Minister of Foreign Affairs
10	Rt Hon Sir Jack Marshall	Shadow Minister of Overseas Trade
11	Hon Douglas Carter	Shadow Minister of Agriculture
12	Hon Percy Allen	Shadow Minister of Works
13	Hon Sir Roy Jack	Shadow Minister for Legislative Department
14	Hon Allan McCready	Shadow Minister of Defence; Shadow Minister of Forests
15	Hon Allan Highet	Shadow Minister of Internal Affairs; Shadow Minister of Local Government; Shadow Minister of Civil Defence
16	Hon Bert Walker	Shadow Minister of Railways; Shadow Minister of Broadcasting; Shadow Minister of Communications
17	Hon Eric Holland	Shadow Minister of Energy; Shadow Minister of Electricity
18	Logan Sloane	Shadow Minister for Counties
19	Hon Venn Young	Shadow Minister of Lands; Shadow Minister of Maori Affairs; Shadow Minister for the Environment
20	Harry Lapwood	Shadow Postmaster-General; Shadow Minister of Tourism
21	Colin McLachlan	Shadow Minister of Transport; Shadow Minister of Civil Aviation
22	Bill Young	Shadow Minister of Roading; Shadow Minister of Women's Affairs
23	Rob Talbot	Shadow Minister of Horticulture; Shadow Minister of Irrigation
24	Jack Luxton	Shadow Minister of Fisheries; Shadow Minister of Islands Affairs
25	Leo Schultz	Shadow Minister of Mines
26	Peter Wilkinson	Shadow Attorney-General; Shadow Minister of Taxation
27	Keith Allen	Shadow Minister of Municipalities; Shadow Minister of Government Insurance
28	Jim Bolger	Shadow Minister of Rural Affairs
29	Ken Comber	Shadow Minister of Sport & Recreation
30	Gavin Downie	Shadow Minister of Consumer Affairs
	Richard Harrison	Senior Whip
	Bill Birch	Junior Whip
