= Charles Curtis (storekeeper) =

New Zealand storekeeper and politician

Charles Stuart Curtis (15 December 1850 – 4 April 1923) was a storekeeper and local politician in Taranaki, New Zealand, and played a leading role in the development of the town of Stratford.

== Biography ==
=== Family background ===
Charles Stuart Curtis was born to George Curtis and Eliza Curtis (née Newsham) in Omata, Taranaki, on 15 December 1850. His parents and siblings had emigrated to New Zealand from London earlier that same year. Arriving at Port Nicholson, his father had walked overland from Wellington to New Plymouth, and made preparations for his family, who arrived there on 7 February 1850. They took up a farm in the new settlement of Omata, and George also became the senior partner of Curtis and Watt, a wholesale merchant and agent of Lloyd's in New Plymouth.

=== First Taranaki War ===
War broke out between settlers and Māori in 1860, and as a result Eliza and the children moved to New Plymouth. George remained at the Omata stockade, but after seeing his home burned to the ground, and to avoid the epidemics plaguing the crowded town of New Plymouth, the Curtis family evacuated to Nelson. They remained there until the hostilities ceased in 1861, then returned to their land at Omata.

=== Business ===
George Curtis became a prominent leader in commercial matters in the province of Taranaki, representing Omata on the Taranaki Provincial Council. Charles worked with his father in their Omata store, and quickly picked up the same business acumen which proved invaluable to his own commercial ventures in the new settlement of Stratford.

=== Pioneers at Stratford ===
In October 1878 Charles and his brother Herbert erected the first permanent building in the newly opened bush settlement of Stratford, a 300-acre (1.2 km^{2}) site for which the first sections had been sold in August of that year. Herbert and another brother George ran a butchery in the nearby settlement of Inglewood, and together with Charles he established a similar operation at Stratford in conjunction with yet another brother, Oswald. The business operated as a butchery, a merchant store, and also a bakery, and due to its quick growth the Curtis Brothers replaced their temporary premises with a two-storey building and bakehouse in January 1879. The store also provided postal services for the town until a railway station was erected in 1880. On 3 April 1880, Curtis married Emma Clara Low at Omata Church. Together they had two children; Minnie and Henry.

Curtis was a member of the Town Board from its inception in 1882, and in 1885 was elected chairman, replacing his brother George who had been the inaugural chairman from 1882. Charles continued as Town Board chairman, or Town Clerk, until 1890. A private development of Curtistown was named for the family, as was a street in this development. The streets of Curtistown remained in private ownership until 1899.

Curtis also made a name for himself as he and his brothers explored the eastern slopes of Mount Taranaki/Egmont and cut the original track on that face. With T. H. Penn and Frank Arden he completed the first recorded alpine circuit of the mountain over Christmas 1888, during which they named an eastern ridge and a Manganui River waterfall after Curtis. Charles' wife Emma was also a mountaineer, and was the first woman known to reach the summit by the Stratford Road track. Curtis was also a founding member of the Stratford Bowling Club.

Curtis and his wife eventually retired to New Plymouth. He died on 4 April 1923, aged 72.

== See also ==
- List of mayors of Stratford, New Zealand
