= Percy Thomson =

Percy Thomson MBE

16th Mayor of Stratford
- In office 1929–1933
- Preceded by: James Watson McMillan
- Succeeded by: James Watson McMillan
- In office 1938–1947
- Preceded by: James Watson McMillan
- Succeeded by: Norman Harold Moss

Personal details
- Born: 17 November 1884 Dunedin, New Zealand
- Died: 24 August 1962 (aged 77)
- Spouse: Hilda Spence (m. 1912; died 1954)
- Children: 7, including David
- Profession: Solicitor

Percy Thomson MBE (17 November 1884 – 24 August 1962) was a New Zealand lawyer and politician. He served as mayor of Stratford from 1929 to 1933, and again from 1938 to 1947.

== Early life and family ==
Born in Dunedin on 17 November 1884, Thomson was the son of William Thomson and Elizabeth Sarah Thomson (née Halliwell). He received his secondary education in Dunedin and Sydney.

Thomson moved to Hāwera in 1900 to work as a clerk with his uncle, Herbert Theodore Halliwell, a lawyer. From 1950 to 1910, he was a clerk at Adams Brothers law firm in Dunedin, before entering legal practice himself in Stratford in 1910 under the firm of Halliwell and Thomson.

On 8 April 1912, Thomson married Hilda Spence at the Presbyterian church, Hāwera. Together they had two daughters and five sons, one of whom David Thomson was a New Zealand politician of the National Party.

== Community involvement ==
He owned a dairy farm from 1920 and was director of Ngaere Dairy Company for 25 years. Thomson also served on the Stratford Hospital Board and was Chairman of the Taranaki Patriotic Council for a period following World War II.

He was a long-serving chairman and member of the Stratford Domain Board.

Upon the death of King George V in 1935, Mr Thomson was the driving force behind planting beech trees in Broadway South and renaming it the King George V Memorial Avenue. He was largely responsible for many of the attractive plantings in the town's streets and domains.

Other local committee involvement included vice president of the Taranaki District Law Society, executive of the Municipal Association, President of the Stratford Aero Club, an elder of St Andrews Church, and a member of several horticultural associations.

== Later life ==
In 1928, a portion of his Stratford land was developed and thus named Percy Avenue in his honour.

In the 1946 New Year Honours, Thomson was appointed a Member of the Order of the British Empire. In 1953, he was awarded the Queen Elizabeth II Coronation Medal. He died on 24 August 1962, and was buried at Kopuatama Cemetery, Stratford. He had been predeceased by his wife, Hilda Thomson, in 1954.

He left a significant bequest to be used and applied towards the establishment and maintenance of an arboretum and herbarium of the native flora of New Zealand and an art gallery.

The Stratford District Council established the Percy Thomson Trust to manage these facilities for the benefit of the inhabitants of the Stratford District and the public generally.

The Percy Thomson Gallery is Stratford's public art gallery and was opened in June 2002. The gallery contains both exhibition areas and work areas for use by local artists and community art groups. The gallery provides an active programme of exhibitions and events that is both internally generated and toured from other art collections.
