= 1920 Stratford by-election =

New Zealand by-election

- 6 May 1920
- Turnout: 6,640
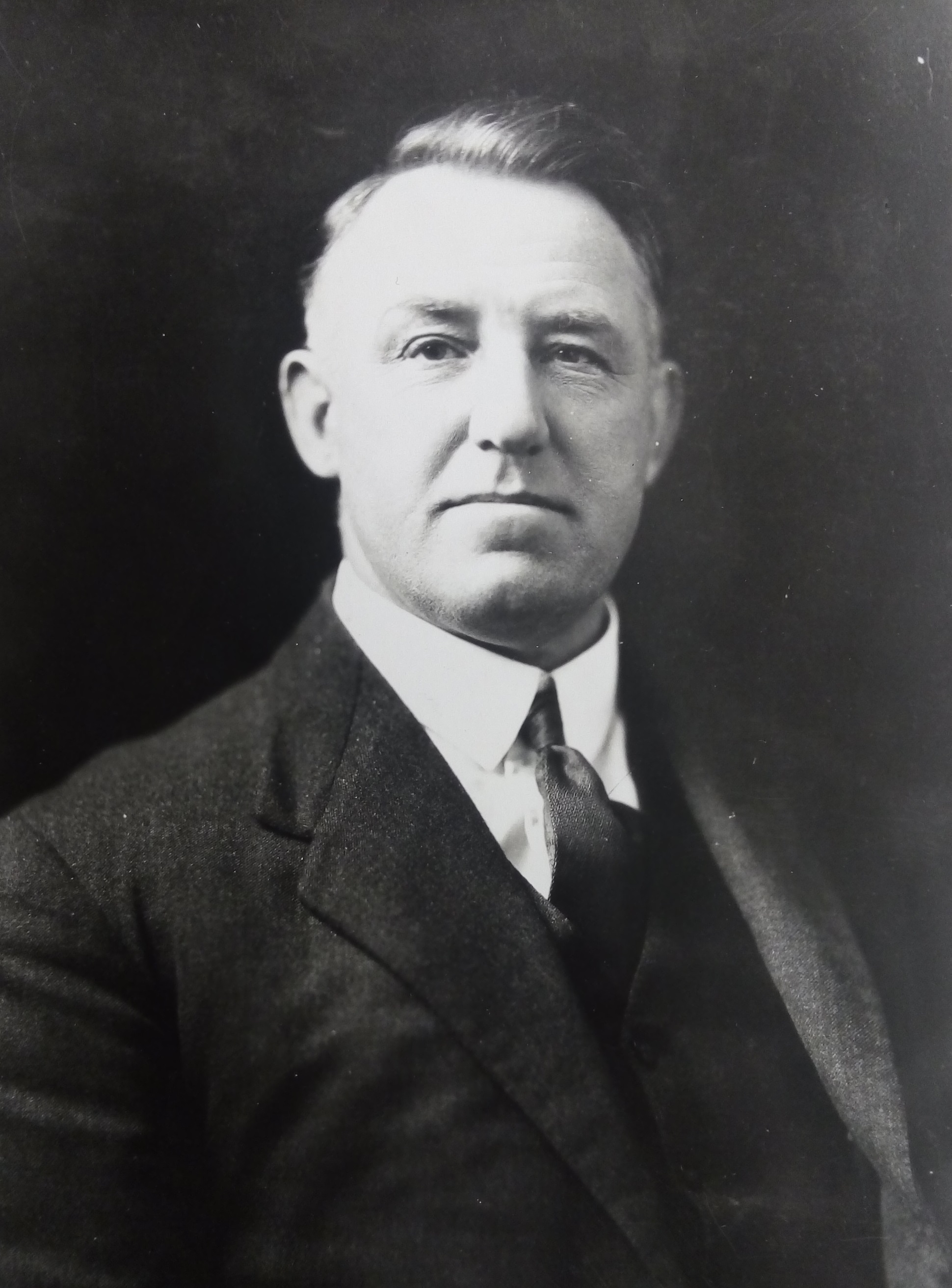

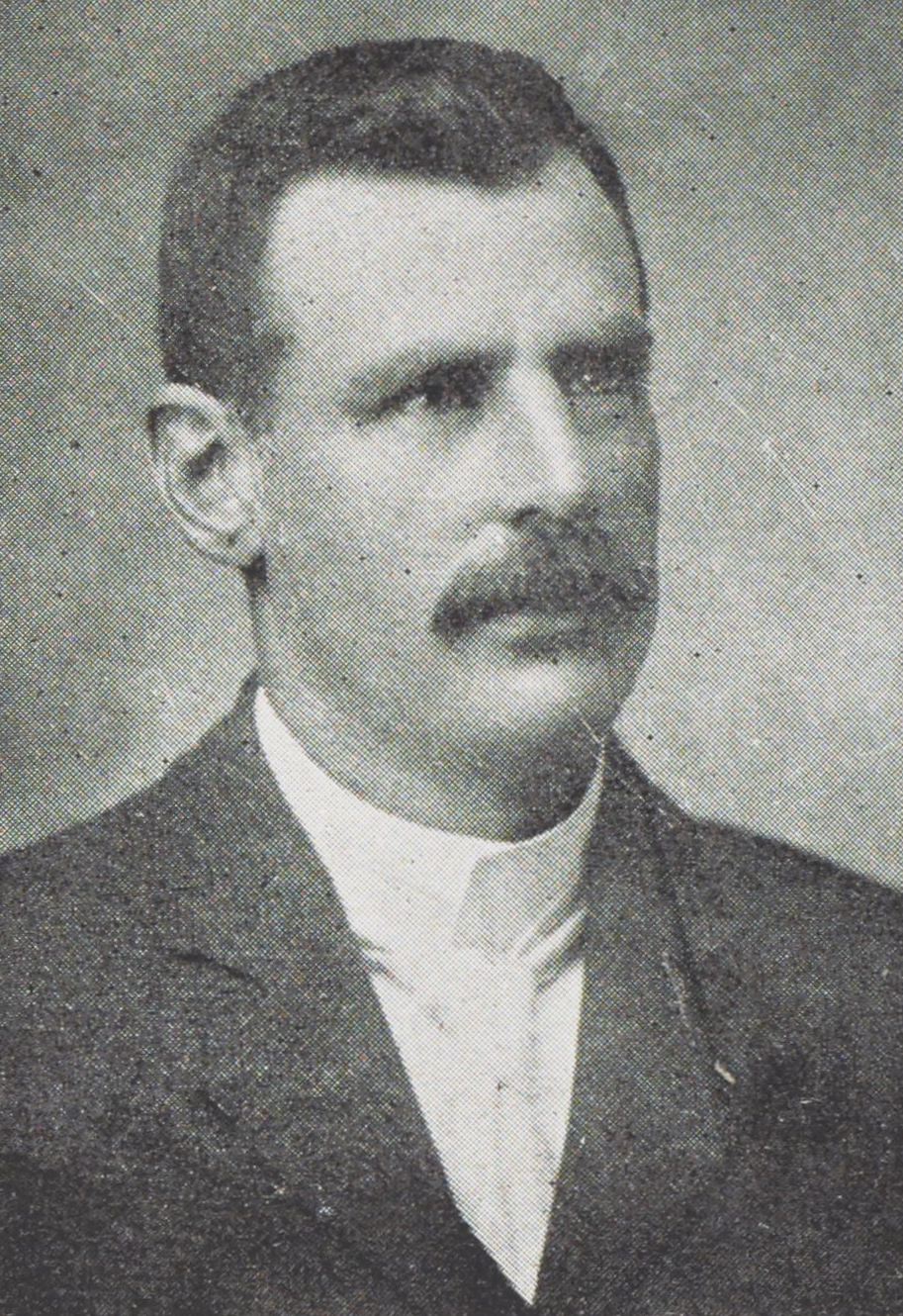
Candidate	Robert Masters	John Bird Hine
Party	Liberal	Reform
Popular vote	3,394	3,246
Percentage	51.12	48.88
Member before election
Robert Masters
Liberal
Elected Member
Robert Masters
Liberal

The 1920 Stratford by-election was a by-election during the 20th New Zealand Parliament for the rural Taranaki seat of Stratford. The by-election was called following the previous election being declared void, invalidating the preceding 1919 general election results. It was held on 6 May 1920.

== Candidates ==
Only two candidates contested the seat. Robert Masters (Liberal Party), who had previously taken the seat off the incumbent John Bird Hine (Reform Party).

== Result ==
The following table gives the election results:

1920 Stratford by-election
Party	Candidate	Votes	%	±%
Liberal	Robert Masters	3,394	51.12	
Reform	John Bird Hine	3,246	48.88	
Majority		148	2.22	
Turnout		6,640		
Liberal hold		Swing		
