= Huiroa =

- Interactive map of Huiroa
- Coordinates: 39°14′54″S 174°28′10″E
- Country: New Zealand
- Region: Taranaki
- Territorial authority: Stratford District
- Ward: Stratford Rural General Ward; Stratford Māori Ward
- Electorates: Taranaki-King Country; Te Tai Hauāuru (Māori)

Government
  - Territorial Authority: Stratford District Council
  - Regional council: Taranaki Regional Council
  - Mayor of Stratford: Neil Volzke
  - Taranaki-King Country MP: Barbara Kuriger
  - Te Tai Hauāuru MP: Debbie Ngarewa-Packer

Huiroa is a settlement in inland Taranaki, in the western North Island of New Zealand. It is located 20 kilometres east of Stratford and eight kilometres north of Douglas. It is situated on the Stratford–Okahukura Line and it is not far from State Highway 43.

== Demographics ==
Huiroa locality covers 112.61 km^{2} (43.48 sq mi). The locality is part of the Douglas statistical area.

Historical population
Year	Pop.	±% p.a.
2006	189	—
2013	192	+0.23%
2018	213	+2.10%
2023	195	−1.75%

Huiroa had a population of 195 in the 2023 New Zealand census, a decrease of 18 people (−8.5%) since the 2018 census, and an increase of 3 people (1.6%) since the 2013 census. There were 105 males and 90 females in 69 dwellings. 1.5% of people identified as LGBTIQ+. The median age was 36.2 years (compared with 38.1 years nationally). There were 51 people (26.2%) aged under 15 years, 33 (16.9%) aged 15 to 29, 99 (50.8%) aged 30 to 64, and 12 (6.2%) aged 65 or older.

People could identify as more than one ethnicity. The results were 96.9% European (Pākehā), 4.6% Māori, and 1.5% Asian. English was spoken by 98.5%, Māori by 1.5%, and other languages by 4.6%. No language could be spoken by 1.5% (e.g. too young to talk). New Zealand Sign Language was known by 1.5%. The percentage of people born overseas was 12.3, compared with 28.8% nationally.

The sole religious affiliation given was 24.6% Christian. People who answered that they had no religion were 66.2%, and 10.8% of people did not answer the census question.

Of those at least 15 years old, 27 (18.8%) people had a bachelor's or higher degree, 87 (60.4%) had a post-high school certificate or diploma, and 30 (20.8%) people exclusively held high school qualifications. The median income was $48,700, compared with $41,500 nationally. 15 people (10.4%) earned over $100,000 compared to 12.1% nationally. The employment status of those at least 15 was 96 (66.7%) full-time and 30 (20.8%) part-time.

== Education ==
Huiroa primary school opened in 1897 and closed in 1991, with Toko School taking over the education of local children.
