= Cardiff, New Zealand =

Cardiff
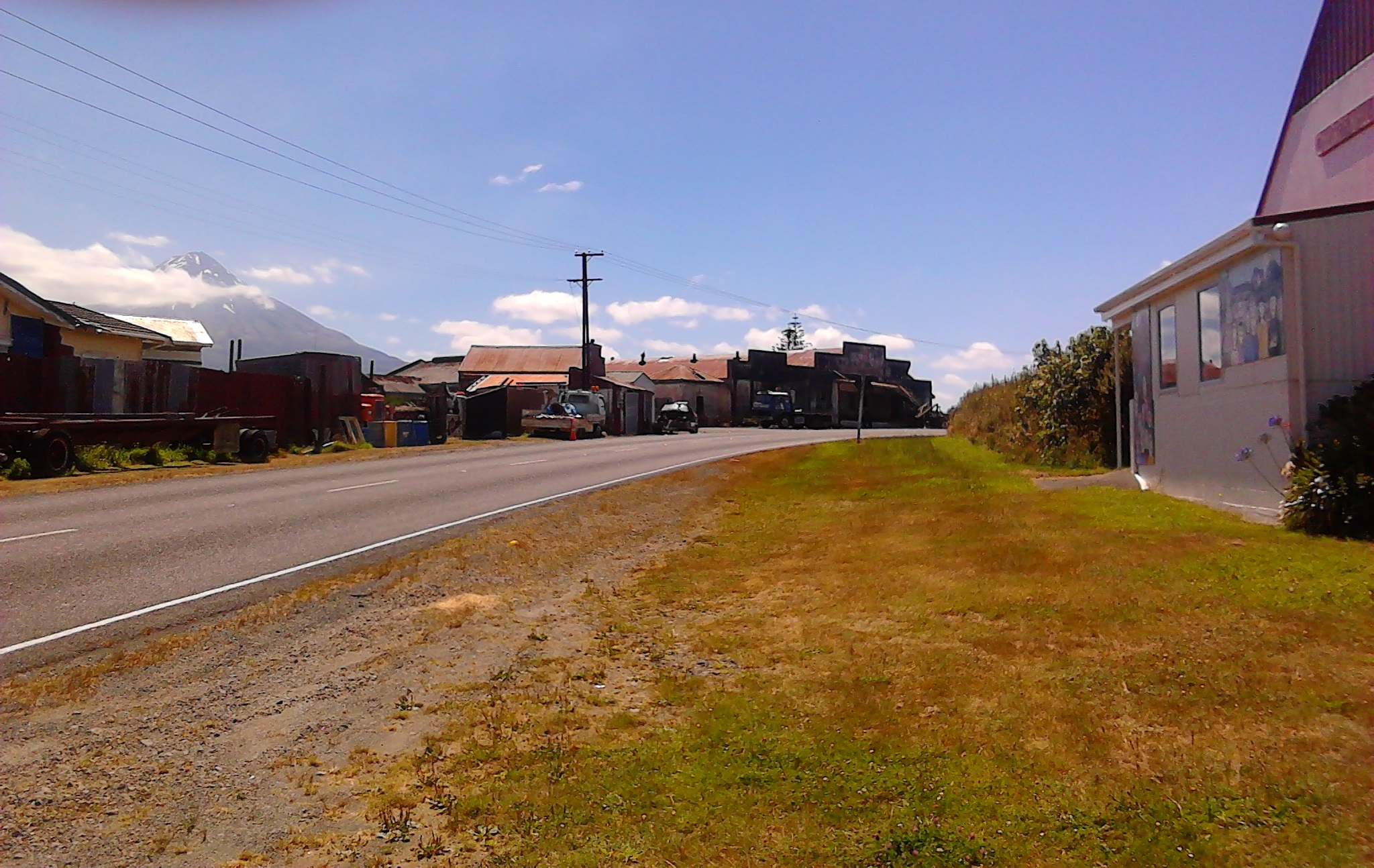
- View of Cardiff, with Mount Taranaki in the background
- Interactive map of Cardiff
- Coordinates: 39°21′38″S 174°13′52″E
- Country: New Zealand
- Region: Taranaki
- District: Stratford District
- Ward: Stratford Rural General Ward; Stratford Māori Ward
- Electorates: Whanganui; Te Tai Hauāuru (Māori)

Government
  - Territorial Authority: Stratford District Council
  - Regional council: Taranaki Regional Council
  - Mayor of Stratford: Neil Volzke
  - Whanganui MP: Carl Bates
  - Te Tai Hauāuru MP: Debbie Ngarewa-Packer

Cardiff is a settlement in inland Taranaki, in the western North Island of New Zealand. It is named after Cardiff, Wales. It is located five kilometres southwest of Stratford close to Egmont National Park.

== Demographics ==
Cardiff locality covers 52.17 km^{2} (20.14 sq mi). The locality is part of the Pembroke statistical area.

Historical population
Year	Pop.	±% p.a.
2006	327	—
2013	330	+0.13%
2018	333	+0.18%
2023	342	+0.53%

Cardiff had a population of 342 in the 2023 New Zealand census, an increase of 9 people (2.7%) since the 2018 census, and an increase of 12 people (3.6%) since the 2013 census. There were 183 males and 153 females in 126 dwellings. 0.9% of people identified as LGBTIQ+. There were 78 people (22.8%) aged under 15 years, 57 (16.7%) aged 15 to 29, 165 (48.2%) aged 30 to 64, and 39 (11.4%) aged 65 or older.

People could identify as more than one ethnicity. The results were 95.6% European (Pākehā); 9.6% Māori; 1.8% Pasifika; 0.9% Middle Eastern, Latin American and African New Zealanders (MELAA); and 3.5% other, which includes people giving their ethnicity as "New Zealander". English was spoken by 97.4%, and other languages by 1.8%. No language could be spoken by 1.8% (e.g. too young to talk). The percentage of people born overseas was 5.3, compared with 28.8% nationally.

Religious affiliations were 23.7% Christian, 0.9% Buddhist, and 0.9% other religions. People who answered that they had no religion were 64.0%, and 10.5% of people did not answer the census question.

Of those at least 15 years old, 24 (9.1%) people had a bachelor's or higher degree, 168 (63.6%) had a post-high school certificate or diploma, and 78 (29.5%) people exclusively held high school qualifications. 27 people (10.2%) earned over $100,000 compared to 12.1% nationally. The employment status of those at least 15 was 156 (59.1%) full-time, 39 (14.8%) part-time, and 3 (1.1%) unemployed.

== Education ==
Cardiff Primary School opened in 1886 and closed in 1999.

== Gallery ==
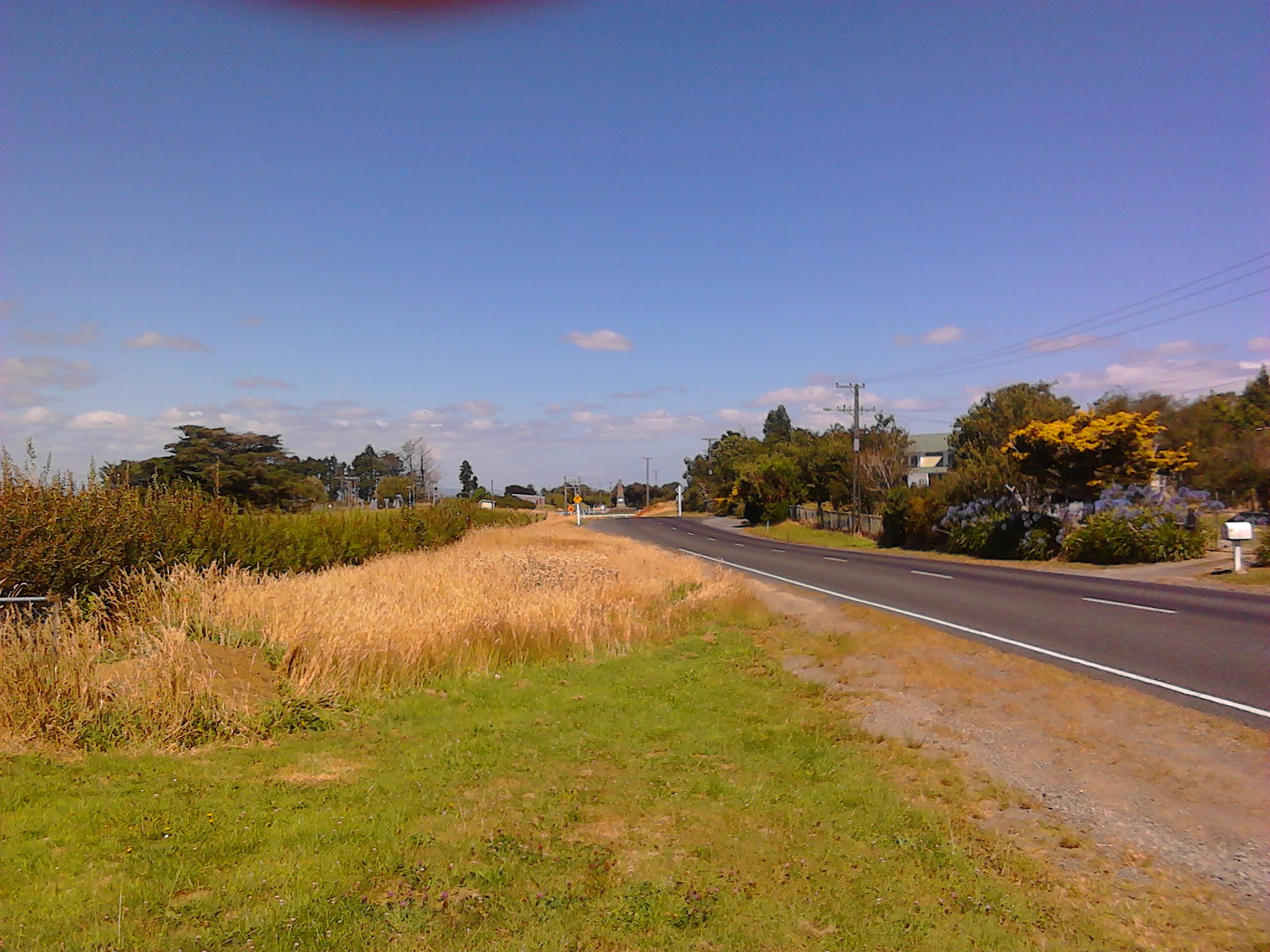
Cardiff, looking south

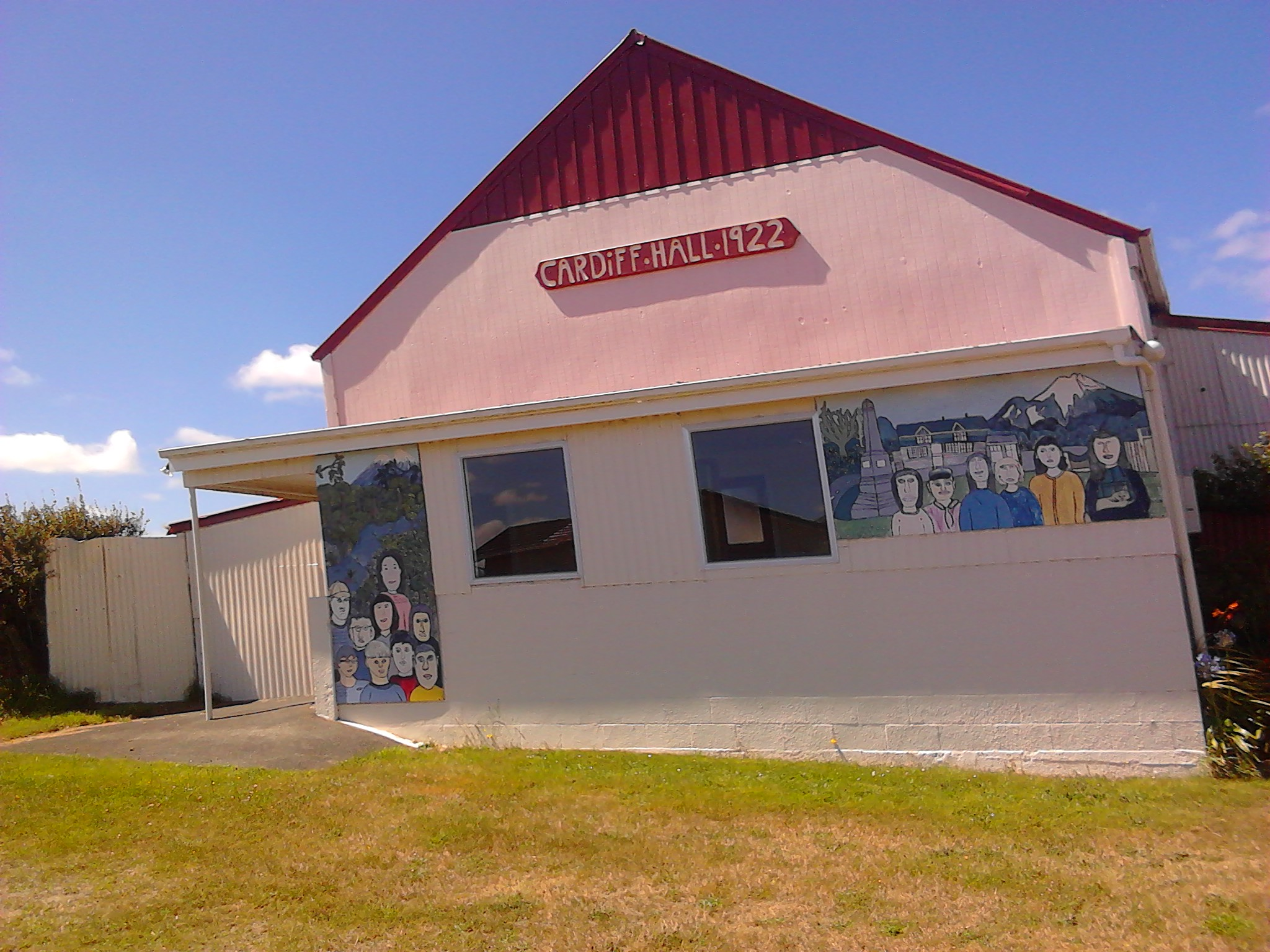
Cardiff Hall

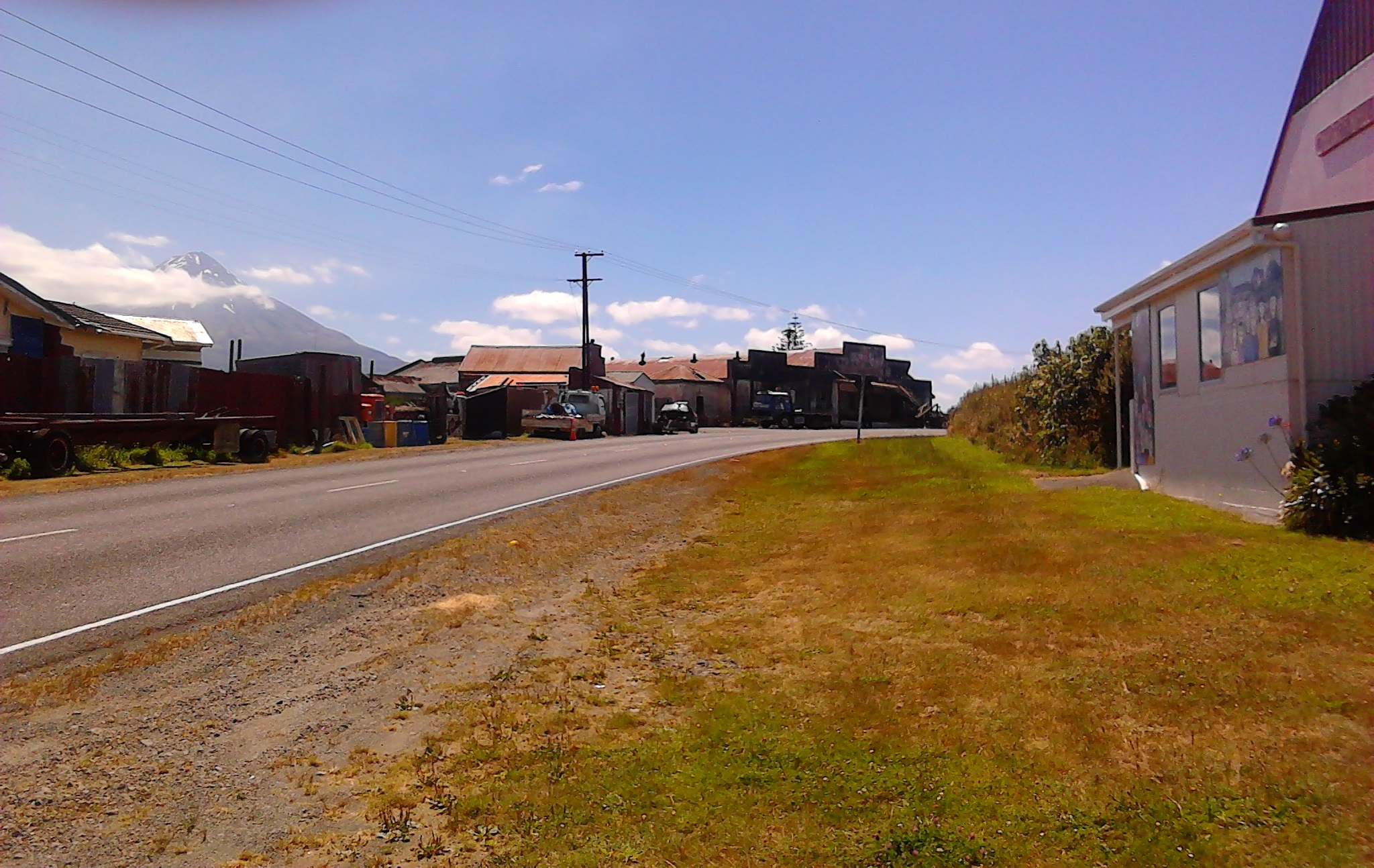
Cardiff, looking north
