= David Thomson (New Zealand politician) =

New Zealand politician (1915–1999)

The Right Honourable David Thomson CMG MC ED
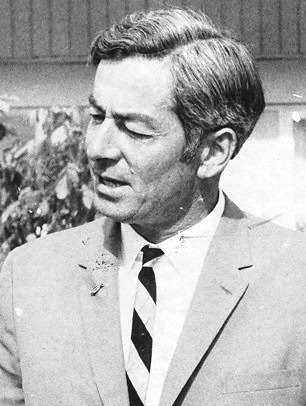
- Thomson in 1969

23rd Minister of Defence
- In office 12 December 1966 – 9 February 1972
- Prime Minister: Keith Holyoake
- Preceded by: Dean Jack Eyre
- Succeeded by: Allan McCready
- In office 28 August 1980 – 26 July 1984
- Prime Minister: Robert Muldoon
- Preceded by: Frank Gill
- Succeeded by: Frank O'Flynn

18th Minister of Tourism
- In office 4 March 1967 – 12 December 1969
- Prime Minister: Keith Holyoake
- Preceded by: Robert Muldoon
- Succeeded by: Bert Walker

20th Minister of Police
- In office 22 December 1969 – 9 February 1972
- Prime Minister: Keith Holyoake
- Preceded by: Percy Allen
- Succeeded by: Percy Allen

23rd Minister of Labour
- In office 7 February 1972 – 8 December 1972
- Prime Minister: Keith Holyoake
- Preceded by: Jack Marshall
- Succeeded by: Hugh Watt

36th Minister of Immigration
- In office 7 February 1972 – 8 December 1972
- Prime Minister: Jack Marshall
- Preceded by: Jack Marshall
- Succeeded by: Fraser Colman

37th Minister of Justice
- In office 12 December 1975 – 13 December 1978
- Prime Minister: Robert Muldoon
- Preceded by: Martyn Finlay
- Succeeded by: Jim McLay

Member of the New Zealand Parliament for Stratford
- In office 30 November 1963 – 25 November 1978
- Preceded by: Tom Murray
- Succeeded by: Constituency abolished

Member of the New Zealand Parliament for Taranaki
- In office 25 November 1978 – 14 July 1984
- Preceded by: In abeyance (last held by Charles Bellringer)
- Succeeded by: Roger Maxwell

Personal details
- Born: David Spence Thomson; 15 November 1915 Stratford, New Zealand
- Died: 25 October 1999 (aged 83)
- Party: National Party
- Spouse: June Grace Adams (m. 1942)
- Children: Four
- Profession: Dairy farmer

David Spence Thomson CMG MC ED PC (14 November 1915 – 25 October 1999) was a New Zealand politician of the National Party.

== Biography ==
Thomson was born in Stratford, the son of former Stratford mayor Percy Thomson. He was a dairy farmer.

He served in the Army in the Middle East in World War II and was a Prisoner of War in 1942. He was awarded the Military Cross (MC) later in 1942. He married June Grace Adams in April 1942. They had one son and three daughters.

In the post-war years he was chairman of Federated Farmers. In 1953, he was awarded the Queen Elizabeth II Coronation Medal.

== Parliamentary career ==
New Zealand Parliament
Years	Term	Electorate	Party
1963–1966	34th	Stratford	National
1966–1969	35th	Stratford	National
1969–1972	36th	Stratford	National
1972–1975	37th	Stratford	National
1975–1978	38th	Stratford	National
1978–1981	39th	Taranaki	National
1981–1984	40th	Taranaki	National

Thomson was first elected to Parliament, representing the Stratford electorate, in 1963 as a member of the National Party. He was returned for that electorate in every election until 1978, when it was disestablished. He served two terms as the Member of Parliament for Taranaki (the replacement seat) from 1978 to 1984, when he retired.

When Thomson entered Parliament, Keith Holyoake's government was in its second term. Thomson was appointed a minister in the government's third term, after the 1966 election. He initially held the roles of Minister of Defence, Minister in charge of Publicity, War Pensions and Rehabilitation, and Minister Assistant to the Prime Minister. Later he was also Minister of Tourism. For the government's fourth and final term, from 1969 to 1972, Thomson was Minister of Police and latterly in 1972 was Minister of Immigration.

Thomson won re-election in 1972 but National was unable to form a government. He served as National's Labour and Immigration spokesperson under Jack Marshall, and as Justice, Police and Immigration spokesperson under Robert Muldoon.

National formed a new government in 1975. Thomson was Minister of Justice from 1975 to 1978 and Minister of Defence and Leader of the House from 1978 to 1984, when he retired.

In the 1993 New Year Honours, Thomson was appointed a Companion of the Order of St Michael and St George, for public services.

== Footnotes ==
Political offices
Preceded by Percy Allen	Minister of Police; 1969–1972	Succeeded by Percy Allen
Preceded by Martyn Finlay	Minister of Justice; 1975–1978	Succeeded by Jim McLay
New Zealand Parliament
Preceded by Thomas Murray	Member of Parliament for Stratford; 1963–1978	Constituency abolished
In abeyance Title last held by Charles Bellringer	Member of Parliament for Taranaki; 1978–1984	Succeeded by Roger Maxwell
