= Mel Brieseman =

New Zealand surgeon

Melvin Athol Brieseman
- Born: 13 June 1934; Stratford, New Zealand
- Died: 25 October 2010 (aged 76); Christchurch, New Zealand
- Occupation: Physician
- Medical career
- Field: Surgery, obstetrics, public health

Melvin Athol Brieseman (13 June 1934 – 25 October 2010) was a New Zealand public health official, surgeon, obstetrician and missionary to India.

== Early life and education ==
Brieseman was born in Stratford, New Zealand on 13 June 1934, and after completing his primary and secondary schooling in Taranaki left for the University of Otago to study medicine.

== Career ==
After graduation, he returned to Taranaki, taking up a house surgeon job in New Plymouth. Brieseman spent four years in this job, before he left for England after being granted a scholarship. He spent a year there before emigrating to India where he worked as a missionary north of Bombay.

Brieseman spent 10 years in India as a practicing surgeon and obstetrician while his wife helped with hospital and outreach programmes in the villages. This “third-world” work inspired in Brieseman an interest in public health, and, when his children began to outgrow the Indian education system he and his family returned to Dunedin where he completed a Diploma in Public Health. After his return Indian authorities became less accepting of foreign doctors, which discouraged Brieseman from plans to go back. He instead took on a government job as the Medical Officer of Health for the Canterbury region in 1977, and has held the position for nearly 30 years. In this time Brieseman has monitored and managed public health response to issues such as water quality, HIV, smoking, measles, influenza, diabetes and Legionnaires' disease.

== Personal life ==
He met his wife, Joan, during medical school. They had four children. When they lived in India, their children were schooled 1000 km to the south, returning to their parents for the school holidays.

Melvin Brieseman died at his home in Christchurch on 25 October 2010.
