= John Bird Hine =

New Zealand politician (1868–1954)

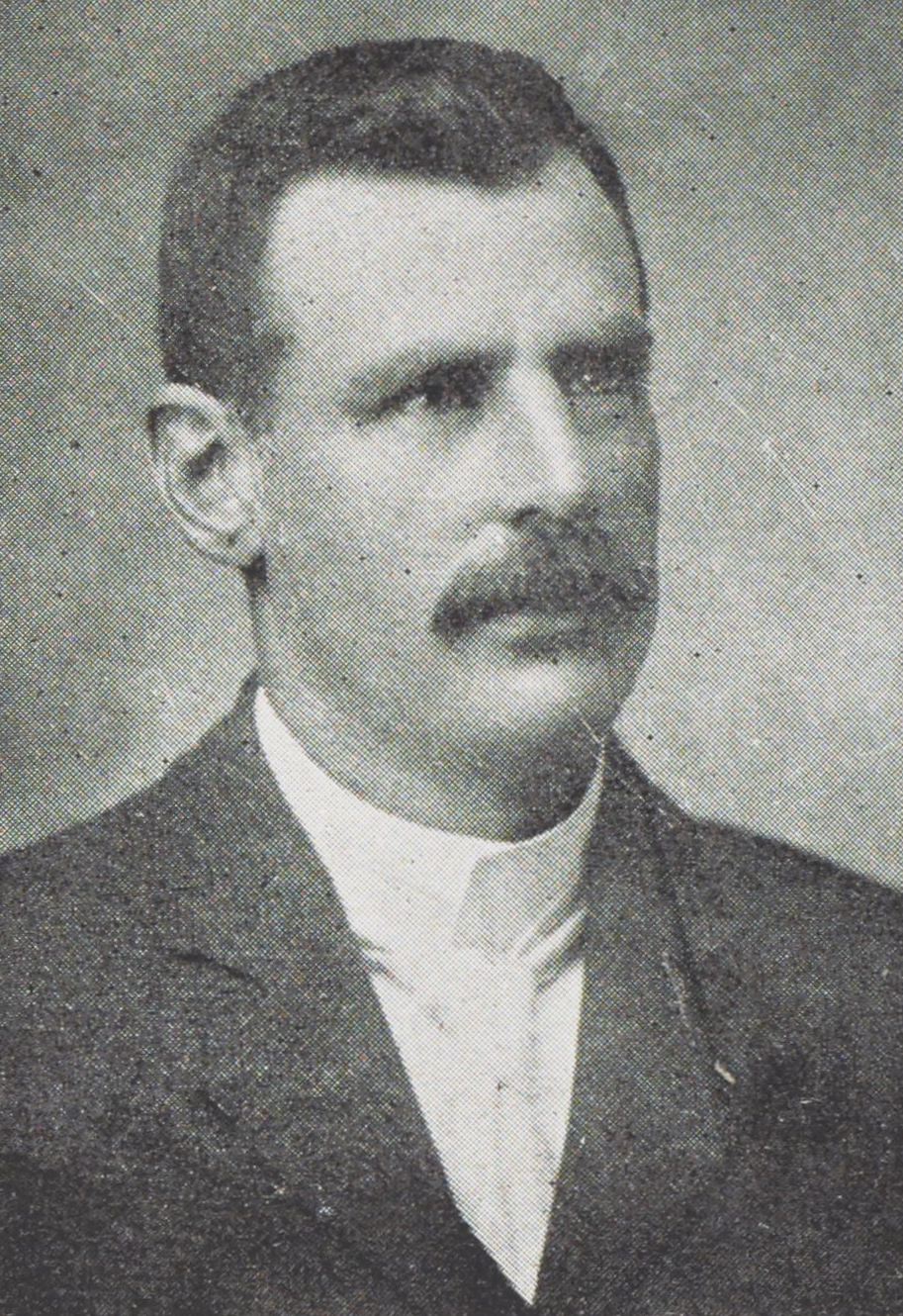
John Bird Hine

John Bird Hine (1868 – 4 February 1954) was a Reform Party Member of Parliament in the Taranaki region of New Zealand. He was Minister of Internal Affairs from 1919 to 1920 in the Reform Government.

New Zealand Parliament
Years	Term	Electorate	Party
1908–1909	17th	Stratford	Independent
1909–1911	Changed allegiance to:		Reform
1911–1914	18th	Stratford	Reform
1914–1919	19th	Stratford	Reform

He won the Stratford electorate in the 1908 general election, and held it to 1919, when he was defeated by Robert Masters of the Liberal Party.

In 1935, he was awarded the King George V Silver Jubilee Medal.

Hine died on 4 February 1954, and was buried at Kopuatama Cemetery in Stratford.
