= Francis Oswald Bennett =

Doctor, military medical administrator, writer

- Born: February 19, 1898; Christchurch
- Died: August 4, 1976 (aged 78)
- Occupation: Doctor

Francis Oswald Bennett OBE (19 February 1898 – 4 August 1976) was a New Zealand medical doctor, military medical administrator and writer.

== Early life and education ==
Bennett was born in Christchurch, New Zealand on 19 February 1898. He attended Fairview School in Timaru and Timaru Boys High School before going on to study medicine at the University of Otago in 1917. His studies were interrupted by World War I when he enlisted as a medical student and served in England in the Medical Corps of the New Zealand Expeditionary Force.

== Career ==
Bennett graduated with an MB ChB in 1926. He worked as a house surgeon at New Plymouth Hospital before setting up in practice in Blackball and later Greymouth and Christchurch. His stints in general practice were not lucrative financially because he kept his fees low to help poor people. In 1935 he was the first non-British person to receive the Hunterian Society medal for his essay on midwifery in general practice. The essay was based on his experience in Blackball. He received an MD from the University of New Zealand in 1934 for his thesis on anaemia in pregnancy.

In 1940 he joined the honorary staff of Christchurch Hospital. In WWII he served again in the New Zealand Expeditionary Force as a medical officer with the rank Lieutenant Colonel. He was deployed as commanding officer of the 3rd Field Ambulance at Burnham Military Camp, to the Pacific, Papakura Military Camp and then on the hospital ship Maunganui in the Mediterranean. He received three awards: the War Medal 1939-1945, the New Zealand War Service Medal and an O.B.E. (Military) in 1946.

After the war Bennett completed study overseas from 1946 to 1947 and returned to Christchurch Hospital as an anaesthetist and assistant physician. On retirement from the position of senior physician at the hospital he became medical officer in homes for the aged and continued to practice as a geriatric physician. He was made an FRACP in 1950.

In 1937 Bennett co-authored Gentlemen of the Jury with Doris Gordon opposing indiscriminate contraception and abortion, though he later distanced himself from the publication. He wrote several more books including a history of Christchurch Hospital Hospital on the Avon, a fictionalised history of Canterbury March of the little men and a biography of his father-in-law Thomas Brash The road from Saddle Hill. The latter, along with his own autobiography A Canterbury tale were published posthumously.

Bennett died in Christchurch on 4 August 1976.

== Personal life ==
Bennett married Pearl Allan Brash in 1927 and they had five children.

== Selected publications ==
- Gentlemen of the Jury (1937) - co-authored with Doris Gordon
- Hospital on the Avon: the history of the Christchurch hospital, 1862-1962 (1962)
- Cashmere Sanatorium (now Coronation Hospital), 1906-1964 (1964)
- The tenth home (1966)
- March of the little men (1971)
- A Canterbury tale: the autobiography of Dr. Francis Bennett (1980)
- The road from Saddle Hill: being the biography of a New Zealander, Thomas Cuddie Brash (1982)
