= Lane Penn =

New Zealand rugby player and coach (1938–2014)

- Born: Paul Lane Penn; 12 June 1938 Stratford, New Zealand
- Died: 10 May 2014 (aged 75) Masterton, New Zealand
- School: New Plymouth Boys' High School
- Occupation: Farmer

Rugby union career
- Position: Wing
Provincial / State sides
| Years | Team | Apps | (Points) |
| 1957–63 | Taranaki | | |
| 1965–66 | Wairarapa | 12 | |
Coaching career
- Years: Team
- 1983–86: Wairarapa-Bush

Paul Lane Penn (12 June 1938 – 10 May 2014) was a New Zealand rugby union player, coach and administrator. A wing, Penn played for Taranaki and Wairarapa at provincial level, and later became coach of Wairarapa-Bush. He was an All Black selector from 1988 to 1991, and served as president of the New Zealand Rugby Football Union from 2001 to 2003.

== Biography ==
Penn was born in Stratford, New Zealand on 12 June 1938, and was educated at New Plymouth Boys' High School. He made his debut for Taranaki while still at school, and went on to play more than 50 games for the province — including 10 Ranfurly Shield matches, and internationals against France and Australia — between 1957 and 1963. After moving to the Wairarapa, Penn joined the Gladstone club and played 12 games for the provincial side there between 1965 and 1966.

Penn later became coach of the Gladstone senior team, and after taking them to a club championship, succeeded Brian Lochore as coach of Wairarapa-Bush in 1983. He coached the provincial side for four years, during which time they maintained their first-division status, finishing as high as fourth in the 1985 season.

In 1988 Penn was appointed as an All Black selector, once again taking over from Lochore, and served in that role until 1991. During that time Penn coached the New Zealand development team, New Zealand Marist and the New Zealand under-19 side. As a coach of national teams, Penn was undefeated. He also served as an assistant to All Blacks coach Alex Wyllie and was a member of the selection panel which chose John Hart as All Blacks coach.

Penn was elected vice-president of the New Zealand Rugby Football Union in 1999 and succeeded Andy Dalton as president in 2001. His two-year term was characterized by his strong advocacy for grassroots and provincial rugby in New Zealand.

Outside of rugby, Penn was a farmer at Opaki, near Masterton. He died at Wairarapa Hospital on 10 May 2014, following a stroke suffered while working on the farm two days earlier.
