= Graham Gordon =

New Zealand surgeon

Graham Rothwell Gordon (10 December 1927 – 29 February 2004) was a New Zealand general practitioner and surgeon.

== Biography ==
Gordon was born in Stratford in 1927, the third son of doctors William Patteson Pollock Gordon and Doris Clifton Gordon (née Jolly) who ran a medical practice and the small Marire private hospital in Stratford. His older brother was Peter Gordon. He was educated at Nelson College from 1941 to 1944 and the University of Otago, from where he graduated MB ChB in 1951. He then trained and worked as a surgeon in the United Kingdom, returning to the family practice in Stratford in October 1957.

Gordon was a part-time visiting surgeon at Stratford Hospital from 1957 until 1991 when the theatre closed. He was also committed to the local emergency services, serving as a police surgeon for over 30 years and a St John Ambulance officer. He was an honorary surgeon with the Stratford Volunteer Fire Brigade, establishing the first rural GP first-response road trauma service in New Zealand, and was active in helicopter search and rescue work.

An executive member of the Taranaki division of the New Zealand Medical Association (NZMA) for 19 years, Gordon held the office of secretary and then president. He served as NZMA council chairman from 1977 to 1988, and NZMA president from 1990 to 1991. He was elected a fellow of the NZMA in 1981. In 2000 he received a Stratford District citizen's award.

In 1999, Gordon sold his medical practice but retained his involvement in local health issues and patient care until shortly before his death in 2004. He was buried at Kopuatama Cemetery.
