= Ross Allen (politician) =

New Zealand politician and cricket umpire (1928–2019)

Ross Allen QSO JP

1st Chairman of Taranaki Regional Council
- In office 1989 – October 2001
- Succeeded by: David Walter

Personal details
- Born: Ross Leslie Allen; 4 November 1928 Dannevirke, New Zealand
- Died: 1 January 2019 (aged 90) New Plymouth, New Zealand

Ross Leslie Allen QSO JP (4 November 1928 – 1 January 2019) was a New Zealand politician who served as the first chairman of Taranaki Regional Council from 1989 to 2001.

Allen was involved in local government for 27 years, beginning in 1974 when he was elected as a member of Taranaki County Council. From 1983 to 2001, he was successively elected chairman of the county council, the North Taranaki District Council (formed in 1986), and Taranaki Regional Council (formed in 1989). Following his retirement, he was appointed a Companion of the Queen's Service Order for public services in the 2001 Queen's Birthday Honours.

Allen was involved in both rugby and cricket in the 1960s and 1970s, having served as president of the Taranaki Rugby Referees’ Association in 1969, and as a cricket umpire in a number of first-class matches.

Allen died in New Plymouth on 1 January 2019.
