= Edward Walter =

New Zealand politician (1866–1932)

New Zealand Parliament
Years	Term	Electorate	Party
1925–1928	22nd	Stratford	Reform

Edward Walter (15 January 1866 – 30 January 1932) was a New Zealand politician from Taranaki.

== Life ==
Walter was born on 14 January 1866 in Stratton, Cornwall, England, and baptised on 8 February 1866, in Stratton Parish Church. He was the son of John Walter and Nancy Player Smith, who married on 4 April 1865, in Bude Haven Parish, Cornwall. His father was a yeoman, of Kilkhampton. At the time of his son's baptism he was recorded as an Inn Keeper, the same occupation as his father-in-law. Edward Walter married Louise King Jones in 1901 in New Zealand, and they had five children. She died at 36 years of age in 1910. He later married Bella Reid Young in 1917, and they had five children. in 1866. He came to New Zealand in 1886 and lived for one year in the Waikato and in the Hawke's Bay Region. He then moved to Douglas in Taranaki where he stayed for the rest of his life.

He was Chairman of the Stratford County Council from 1917 to 1925.

He was elected Reform Party Member of Parliament for Stratford in 1925, but was defeated in 1928. He died aged 66 years on 30 January 1932, after having been ill for half a year, and was buried in Kopuatama Cemetery.

His grandson, David Walter, was also Chairman of the Stratford County Council, and then Mayor of Stratford and Chairman of the Taranaki Regional Council.
