= Norman Moss =

Solicitor, Mayor of Stratford, New Zealand

Norman Moss OBE

Mayor of Stratford, New Zealand
- In office 1947–1957
- Preceded by: Percy Thomson
- Succeeded by: George JW Boon

Personal details
- Born: Norman Harold Moss; 1896 Dunedin, New Zealand
- Died: 1974 (aged 77–78) Ōakura, New Zealand
- Resting place: Kopuatama Cemetery, Stratford, New Zealand
- Spouse: Rita Kathleen Moss (née Grubb)
- Children: 2
- Profession: Solicitor

Norman Harold Moss OBE (1896–1974) was a New Zealand lawyer and politician. He served as the mayor of Stratford from 1947 to 1957.

== Early years ==
He was born in Dunedin in 1896 and educated at Wellington College. After leaving college he was the first New Zealander to be employed in the Commercial Bank of Australia when it opened in Wellington in 1912.

At 20 he resigned to join the Medical Corps and served in England and France during World War I. Having started to study for the law before the war, he decided to resume this profession on his return and he qualified in law in 1923, practising in Hāwera and Eltham before moving to Stratford.

He married Rita Kathleen (née Grubb) in 1926.

== Community involvement ==
He made his first venture into local body life when he was elected to the Taranaki Electric Power Board in 1929, serving on the board for twelve years, the last three as chairman. He was also a member of the Stratford Hospital Board, President of the Stratford Racing Club for six years and a foundation member of the Rotary Club of Stratford. During World War II, he became Chief Controller of the Emergency Precautions Scheme in Central Taranaki. He was president of the Municipal Association of New Zealand from 1951 to 1957.

== Professional life ==
In his profession he enjoyed the common law side in which he specialised. Living in a farming district it was natural that much of his practice was associated with the primary industry and some of his legal battles in this line were fought against New Zealand's leading counsel. The best known is what came to be called 'the dip and drip case' concerning the accurate testing of milk for butterfat content. He served as President of the Taranaki District Law Society and also as a member of the New Zealand Law Society. He was the honorary solicitor to the Plunket Society Advisory Board in Stratford for over thirty years.

== Mayoralty ==
During his time as mayor he was heavily involved in planning for the overdue upgrade of the town's facilities and infrastructure. N H Moss was a member of the first National Roads Board and took a prominent role in the merger of the Whangamomona County Council and Stratford County Council in 1955.

Norman Harold Moss accompanies Elizabeth II, Stratford, New Zealand, 1954.

Norman Harold Moss converses with Elizabeth II, Stratford, New Zealand, 1954. The Duke of Edinburgh is behind Elizabeth II and Rita Kathleen Moss looks on from the right.

In 1953, Moss was awarded the Queen Elizabeth II Coronation Medal.

A highlight during his term as mayor was accompanying Elizabeth II and her consort the Duke of Edinburgh along their walkabout in Stratford during the Royal Visit in January 1954. Enthusiasm for the young monarch was high and her walkabout along the main street (Broadway) flanked by people was said to be the first of its kind in New Zealand.

He was appointed to the local Government Commission in April 1957, due to having special knowledge of urban local government. He resigned from mayoral duties at that time.

== Quotes ==
Upon his announcement of retirement from mayoral duties, all members of the council spoke and paid tribute to Mr and Mrs Moss. One came from Councillor Peterson, referring in particular to the dignified manner in which the Mayor and Mayoress had carried out their duties on the occasion of the visit to Stratford of Her Majesty, Queen Elizabeth 11 and His Royal Highness, The Duke of Edinburgh.

When a local reporter questioned how he was able to fit in the vast array of community and professional commitments Norman Harold replied, "I suppose a man develops the capacity to get to the point fairly quickly and I'm lucky to be blessed with a good memory. If I read anything, I've got it."

== Later life ==
He was awarded the OBE for his services in 1954 and retired to Ōakura, New Plymouth where he died in 1974.

His wife Rita and one son Winston predeceased him and he was survived by his son John Barrie (d.2007) and granddaughter Jennifer Moss.

== See also ==
- List of mayors of Stratford, New Zealand
