= Jack Walter (rugby union) =

- Born: John Walter; 2 August 1904 Toko, New Zealand
- Died: 25 April 1966 (aged 61) Stratford, New Zealand
- Height: 1.83 m (6 ft 0 in)
- Weight: 82 kg (181 lb)
- School: New Plymouth Boys' High School
- Notable relative: Alan Smith (nephew)

Rugby union career
- Position: Loose forward
Provincial / State sides
| Years | Team | Apps | (Points) |
| 1924–1932 | Taranaki | 85 | |
International career
| Years | Team | Apps | (Points) |
| 1925 | New Zealand | 7 | (12) |

John Walter (2 August 1904 – 25 April 1966) was an All Black and Taranaki rugby football representative in the 1920s and 1930s.

== Biography ==
John Walter was born in Toko on 2 August 1904. Playing for the Stratford club, he was selected for his first game for Taranaki in 1924. In 1925 he was selected for the All Black tour of Australia, where, as a 20-year-old, he played in seven of the eight matches and scored four tries. He looked to have a promising career ahead of him, however the competition as loose forward was too great and Walter lost his place.

Between 1924 and 1932 Walter played 85 matches for Taranaki, and played in the combined Taranaki-Wanganui side against the touring New South Wales team in 1925. In 1931 he led Taranaki to an 11–10 victory over the touring Australian side.

John Walter died on 25 April 1966 in Stratford. His nephew Alan Smith, also playing out of the Stratford club, was a Taranaki representative and an All Black lock in 1967–70.
