= Jack Bergin (neurologist) =

New Zealand neurologist

Jack Bergin FRACP FRCP
- Born: John Daniel Bergin; 17 January 1921; Stratford, New Zealand
- Died: 22 July 1995 (aged 74)
- Occupation: Neurologist

John Daniel Bergin (17 January 1921 – 22 July 1995) was a New Zealand neurologist and Catholic anti-abortion apologist. He was born in Stratford, New Zealand, to Martin Bernard Bergin and Minni Bergin (née Hignett). Martin Bergin was a barrister and solicitor in Stratford. Minni was a full-time mother and homemaker who died when Jack was only 12 years old, leaving a large family.

Bergin received his secondary education at St Patrick's College, Silverstream, and went on to study medicine at the University of Otago. He graduated with distinction in 1943, then went to serve with the New Zealand Medical Corps at World War II in the Middle East, Italy and Japan. Upon returning to New Zealand he worked in medicine in Dunedin and Wellington Hospitals before travelling to Britain where he was a student and house physician at the Royal Post Graduate Medical School at Hammersmith. He graduated from Hammersmith in 1948, and received a Nuffield Fellowship which led to his appointment to the National Hospital for Nervous Diseases, Queen Square, London.

In 1956, Bergin returned to New Zealand and succeeded Dr I.M. Allen as the second neurologist to Wellington Hospital. He was the driving force behind the establishment of neuroradiology and clinical neurophysiology, and by 1967 a modern neurological department had been created. Bergin also ran a private practice and for a time was visiting neurologist to Wanganui and Hāwera hospitals. He had long standing involvements with the Home of Compassion and Calvary hospitals in Wellington.

Bergin was a member of the New Zealand Epilepsy Association council, and assisted neurological research via his participation in the Scientific Advisory Committee of the New Zealand Neurological Association which he helped found the Neurological Association of New Zealand in 1971. He was also a Foundation Member of the Australasian Association of Neurologists. He became a Fellow of the Royal Australasian College of Physicians in 1958, and a Fellow of the Royal College of Physicians (London) in 1969.

Bergin was devoutly committed to the Catholic faith, described by Haas and Hornabrook as "able to articulate, intellectualise, and simplify aspects of Catholicism, and his arguments were always persuasive". For over forty years he was an active member of the Catholic Doctors' Guild of St Luke, SS Cosmas, & Damian which he also served as Master. He was a strong opponent of abortion, and was active in founding the Society for Protection of the Unborn Child. He and his wife were the first New Zealanders appointed by Pope John Paul II to the Pontifical Council for the Family in 1982, and in 1990 the Pope recognised Bergin's considerable contributions and made him a Papal Knight of the Order of St. Gregory the Great.

Bergin was married to Lorna Stark and had eight children, two of whom have become doctors, and one of whom is also a neurologist. He died on 22 July 1995, aged 74.
