= Brian Jeffares =

New Zealand mayor

Brian Robert Jeffares is a New Zealand local-body politician. He is an elected member of Taranaki Regional Council and the Taranaki District Health Board, and was mayor of Stratford from 1998 to 2007.

Jeffares has a background in building and real estate, and also some radio work. Jeffares and his wife Diann have three children. Jeffares is chairman of the Taranaki Electricity Trust, the Stratford Health Trust, and a former trustee of the Taranaki Rescue Helicopter Trust.

In the 2008 New Year Honours, Jeffares was appointed a Member of the New Zealand Order of Merit, for services to local-body affairs and the community.
