= Alan Smith (rugby union) =

New Zealand rugby union player (born 1942)

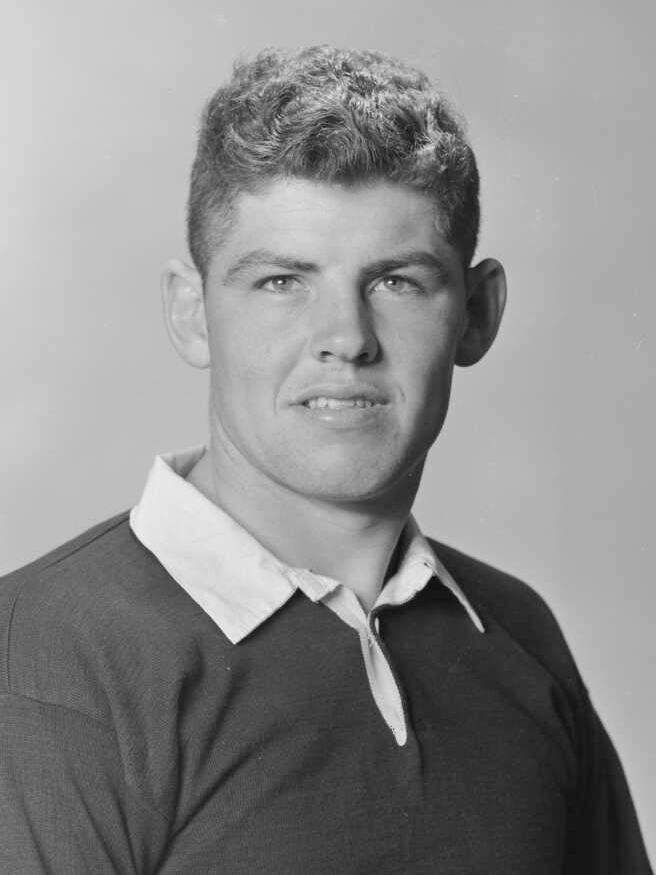
- Smith in 1963
- Born: Alan Edward Smith; 10 December 1942 (age 83) Stratford, New Zealand
- Height: 1.90 m (6 ft 3 in)
- Weight: 100 kg (220 lb)
- School: Stratford Technical High School
- Notable relative: Jack Walter (uncle)

Rugby union career
- Position: Lock
Provincial / State sides
Years	Team	Apps	(Points)
1962–1972	Taranaki	82	(6)
International career
Years	Team	Apps	(Points)
1967–1970	New Zealand	18	(3)

Alan Edward Smith (born 10 December 1942) is a retired New Zealand rugby union footballer, who played for the All Black team as a lock. He was born into a farming family in Douglas, a small settlement east of Stratford, and received his secondary education at Stratford Technical High School.

== Career ==
Smith's father, E. C. Smith, represented Taranaki in 1936–39, and his uncle, Jack Walter, was a 1925 All Black rugby player. Smith took up rugby early, and in 1962 was selected for the Taranaki rugby football team, aged 19. He played for the New Zealand under 23 side which toured Australia in 1963, and first trialled for the All Blacks in 1965. He was selected for the All Blacks for the 1967 tour of the Britain and France where he first donned the black jersey. However, due to the dominance of Colin Meads and Sam Strahan of Manawatu, Smith was not selected for the test matches.

In 1968 Smith was omitted from the All Black team which toured Australia and played France at home, but after a good 1969 trial, and stellar performance leading Taranaki to a 9–9 draw with Wales, Smith was recalled in favour of Strahan. He made his test debut against Wales on 31 May 1969, in Christchurch, and went on to play the second test as well, both of which the All Blacks won resoundingly.

Smith played the first test match of the All Black tour of South Africa in 1970, but missed out on selection for the remaining matches. He played four more games while in South Africa, but these proved to be his last for the All Blacks. In four years Smith played 18 matches for the All Blacks, 3 of which were test matches. He scored 1 try against South African Country in East London.

Smith's 1971 season was plagued by injury, but he managed an appearance for Taranaki against the touring British Lions. This was his last match for Taranaki, retiring after 9 years and 82 games for the "Amber & Blacks".

As well as being a top-level rugby player Smith excelled in cricket. After retiring from rugby he focused on his pace bowling and played for the Taranaki cricket team in the late 1970s. Apart from sport, Smith has carried on the management of the family farm in Douglas where he lives with his wife Christine.
