= William Hawksworth =

New Zealand cricketer

William Hawksworth OBE
- Hawksworth in 1940

Personal information
- Born: 3 March 1911; Nelson, New Zealand
- Died: 14 July 1966 (aged 55); Oxford, England
- Role: Wicket-keeper

Domestic team information
- Years: Team
- 1929/30–1933/34: Otago

Career statistics
Competition	First-class
Matches	12
Runs scored	162
Batting average	14.72
100s/50s	0/0
Top score	27*
Catches/stumpings	20/7
- Source: ESPNcricinfo, 18 August 2020

William Hawksworth OBE (3 March 1911 – 14 July 1966) was a New Zealand cricketer and doctor.

== Life and career ==
Hawksworth was born at Nelson in 1911 and educated at Wairarapa High School and then at Nelson College from 1925 to 1928. He went on to study medicine at the University of Otago, graduating MB ChB in 1935. He won the university medal for obstetrics.

He played twelve first-class matches as a wicket-keeper for Otago between the 1929–30 and 1933–34 seasons. He represented the province whilst studying in Dunedin, and played no first-class cricket after graduating as a doctor in 1935. He scored a total of 162 first-class runs, with a highest score of 27 not out. He scored 21 runs in an innings which formed part of a tenth wicket partnership of 184 runs with Roger Blunt. The partnership, which was made against Canterbury at Lancaster Park in December 1931, set a record for the tenth wicket in New Zealand domestic cricket which, as of January 2024, still stands.

Hawksworth worked as house surgeon at New Plymouth Hospital before moving to London in the late 1930s to continue his studies. He married Roberta Jolliffe of Wellington in London in July 1940.

Hawksworth served in the Medical Corps of the Second New Zealand Expeditionary Force in World War II. He served in North Africa, Greece, Crete and Italy, commanding a field ambulance. He was awarded the OBE for his services.

After the war Hawksworth returned to England. He became a consultant obstetrician and gynaecologist to the United Oxford Hospitals. In 1959 he received the degree of MA Oxon as a Fellow of University College. He served on the Council of the Royal College of Obstetricians and Gynaecologists for six years. Among his patients in Oxford was the American actress Patricia Neal, who gave birth in 1965 after being partially paralysed by a series of strokes.

Hawksworth died in Oxford after a short illness in July 1966, aged 55. He was survived by his widow, a son and two daughters.
