= Peter Gordon (politician) =

New Zealand politician (1921–1991)

The Right Honourable Peter Gordon QSO

10th Minister of Transport
- In office 12 December 1966 – 8 December 1972
- Prime Minister: Keith Holyoake; Jack Marshall
- Preceded by: John McAlpine
- Succeeded by: Basil Arthur

Member of the New Zealand Parliament for Clutha
- In office 26 November 1960 – 25 November 1978
- Preceded by: James Roy
- Succeeded by: Robin Gray

Personal details
- Born: John Bowie Gordon; 23 July 1921 Stratford, New Zealand
- Died: 17 March 1991 (aged 69)
- Party: National
- Spouse: Dorothy
- Parent(s): William Gordon; Doris Gordon
- Relatives: Graham Gordon (brother)

John Bowie Gordon QSO (23 July 1921 – 17 March 1991), known as Peter Gordon, was a New Zealand politician of the National Party.

== Biography ==
=== Early life ===
Gordon was born in Stratford in 1921 to Stratford doctors William and Doris Gordon. Like his two brothers, he attended St Andrew's College, Christchurch, where he was a boarder from 1935 to 1937. He then attended Lincoln College and the Nuffield School in farming in Crookston, Minnesota.

In World War II, he was a flight lieutenant and pilot for the Royal New Zealand Air Force. After the war, he was a farmer and joined many organisations, where he had leading roles with the West Otago A & P Association (president), Farmers' Mutual Insurance (director, 1952–1960), and Shaw, Savill & Albion Line (member of the New Zealand Advisory Board, 1956–1960).

=== Political career ===
New Zealand Parliament
Years	Term	Electorate	Party
1960–1963	33rd	Clutha	National
1963–1966	34th	Clutha	National
1966–1969	35th	Clutha	National
1969–1972	36th	Clutha	National
1972–1975	37th	Clutha	National
1975–1978	38th	Clutha	National

Gordon was the Member of Parliament for Clutha from 1960 to 1978, when he retired for health reasons. With Robert Muldoon and Duncan MacIntyre he was one of the three 'Young Turks' of the National Party, a "ginger group" who entered Parliament in 1960.

In 1966 the Prime Minister at the time Keith Holyoake promoted Gordon to the Cabinet, along with several other backbenchers including future Prime Minister Robert Muldoon. In the Second National Government under Keith Holyoake, he was made Minister of Railways (1966–1972), Minister of Transport (1966–1972), and Minister of Civil Aviation (1966–1968). He maintained the transport and railways portfolios under Jack Marshall in 1972, and was made Minister of Marine and Fisheries.

In the Third National Government under Muldoon, Gordon was from 1975 Minister of Labour and Minister of State Services until his retirement in 1978.

=== Post-politics ===
After leaving politics he served on the Royal Commission into the case of Arthur Allan Thomas and also served on the Otago University Council.

In 1978 he was appointed a board member of Southland Frozen Meat and in 1982 he became board chair until he resigned in 1985. He was also president of the provincial executive and an executive member of the Dominion Meat and Wool Section of Federated Farmers and a member of the first National Hydatids Council.

=== Death ===
On 17 March 1991 Gordon died suddenly while holidaying in Whangarei with his wife, Dorothy, aged 69.

== Honours and recognition ==
He was made a Privy Councillor in 1978, and a Companion of the Queen's Service Order for public services in the 1990 New Year Honours.

== Notes ==
Political offices
Preceded by John McAlpine	Minister of Railways; 1966–1972	Succeeded by Tom McGuigan
New Zealand Parliament
Preceded by James Roy	Member of Parliament for Clutha; 1960–1978	Succeeded by Robin Gray
