= Mayor of Stratford, New Zealand =

Mayor of Stratford
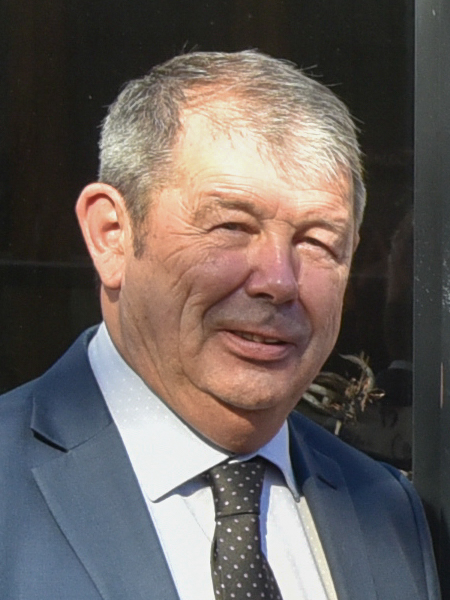
- Incumbent; Neil Volzke since 2009
- Style: His/Her Worship
- Term length: Three years, renewable
- Deputy: Amanda Harris
- Salary: $105,503
- Website: Official website

The mayor of Stratford officiates over the Stratford District Council. The mayor is elected directly using the first-past-the-post electoral system.

The current mayor is Neil Volzke. Volzke was first elected as mayor in a 2009 by-election following the death of previous mayor John Edwards.

== History ==
The first Stratford Town Board was formed in 1882. The Stratford County Council was formed in 1890, and the Stratford Borough Council was formed on 22 July 1898. The county and borough councils amalgamated on 1 April 1989 to form the Stratford District Council, which was reconstituted on 1 November 1989 as part of the nationwide restructure in local government.

== List of mayors of Stratford ==
Stratford has had 24 mayors:

	Name	Term
Mayors of Stratford Borough
1	George Newsham Curtis	1882–1885
2	Charles Curtis	1885–1890
3	Ebenezer Burgess	1890–1892
4	William Loftus Tocker	1892–1894
5	J. B. Patton	1894–1896
(3)	Ebenezer Burgess	1896–1898
6	Harry Norman Liardet	1898–1899
7	Frederick Jeffray Steuart	1900–1901
8	Reginald Brooking Tatton	1901–1902
(6)	Harry Norman Liardet	1902–1903
9	Nathaniel John King	1903–1907
10	Pilcher Frederick Ralfe	1907–1908
11	George A. Sangster	1908–1910
12	Jonas Masters	1910–1912
13	William Patrick Kirkwood	1912–1915
14	Josephiah Wedgwood Boon	1915–1917
15	James Watson McMillan	1917–1929
16	Percy Thomson	1929–1933
(15)	James Watson McMillan	1933–1938
(16)	Percy Thomson	1938–1947
17	Norman Harold Moss	1947–1957
18	George Boon	1957–1971
19	Leo Carrington	1971–1986
20	Lachlan Grant Bond	1986–1989
Mayors of Stratford District
21	David Walter	1989–1998
22	Brian Jeffares	1998–2007
23	John Edwards	2007–2009
24	Neil Volzke	2009–present

== List of deputy mayors of Stratford ==
Name	Term	Mayor
Deputy mayors of Stratford Borough
N. J. King	c. August 1910 (Note: Appointed deputy mayor during Masters' absence from council following the death of his wife.)	Masters
N. J. King	February–March 1912 (Note: Appointed during the mayor's leave of absence. Masters returned to the position in March.)	Masters
J. H. Thompson	1915–1917	Boon
Jonas Masters	1917–1919	McMillan
Campbell Jackson	1919–1923	McMillan
E. Carryer	1923–1925	McMillan
T. I. Lamason	1925–c. 1926 (Note: In May 1926, the Taranaki Daily News referred to Lawson as the deputy mayor, however, in December of the same year, the newspaper referred to Lamason as the deputy mayor.)	McMillan
T. Lawson	c. 1926–1929 (Note: In May 1926, the Taranaki Daily News referred to Lawson as the deputy mayor, however, in December of the same year, the newspaper referred to Lamason as the deputy mayor.)	McMillan
A. H. Nelson	1929–c. 1930	Thomson
N. B. Fletcher	c. 1931–1933	Thomson
William Gordon	1933–c. 1937	McMillan
R. F. Harkness	1938–1944	Thomson
George Boon	1944–1950	Thomson
George Boon	1944–1950	Moss
G. A. Carter	1950–1952	Moss
E. W. McCullough	c. 1952–1953	Moss
J. R. Callaghan	1953–?	Moss
George Boon	?–1957	Moss
Unknown	1957–1989	–
Deputy mayors of Stratford District
Roger White	1989–1992	Walter
Barrie Smith	1992–1998	Walter
John Edwards	1998–2007	Jeffares
Neil Volzke	2007–2009	Edwards
Roger Hignett	2009–2013	Volzke
Alan Jamieson	2013–2022	Volzke
Min McKay	2022–2025	Volzke
Amanda Harris	2025–present	Volzke
