= Stratford, New Zealand =

Settlement in Taranaki Region, New Zealand

Stratford Whakaahurangi (Māori)
- Small urban area
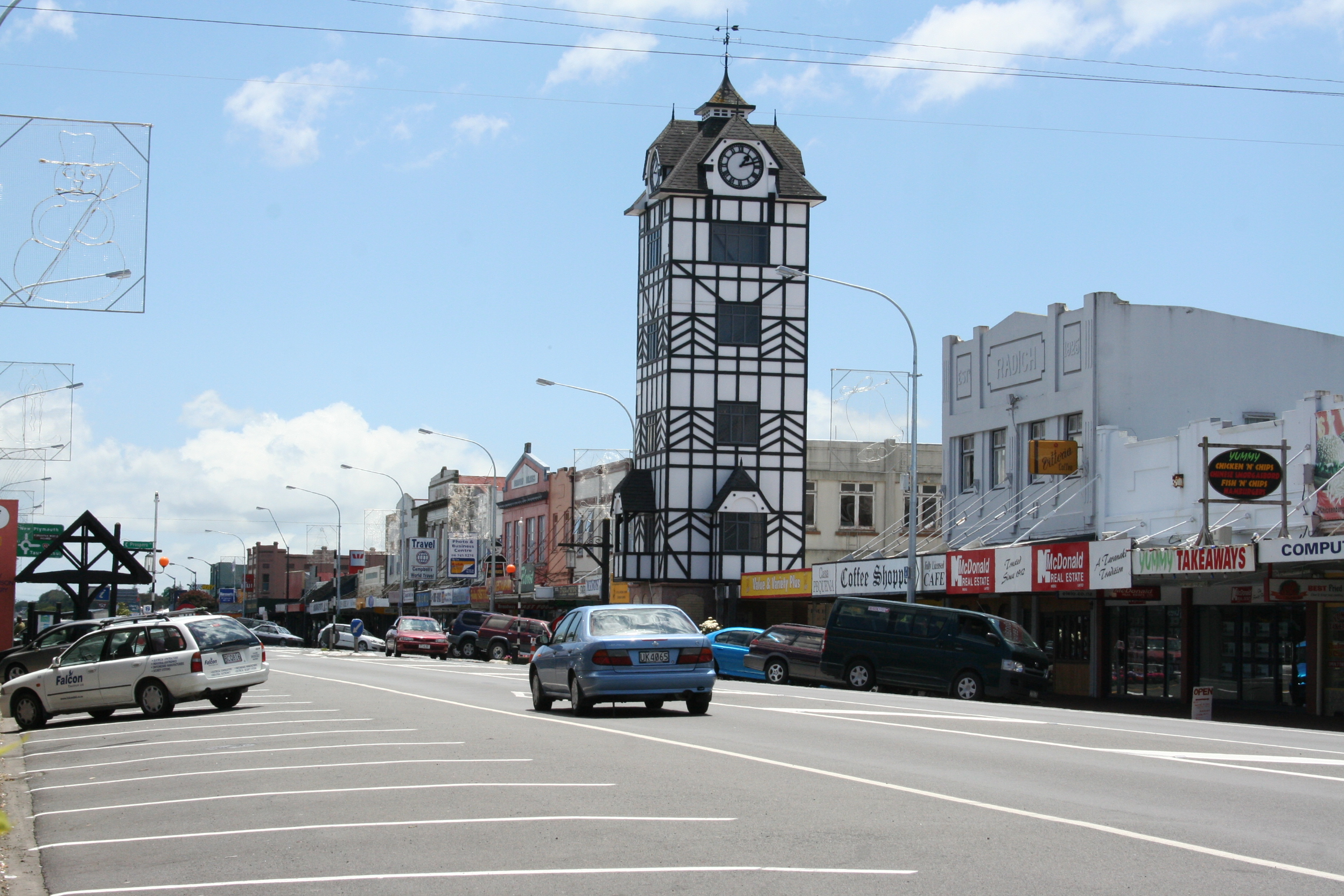
- Interactive map of Stratford
- Coordinates: 39°20′S 174°17′E
- Country: New Zealand
- Region: Taranaki
- Territorial authority: Stratford District
- Ward: Stratford Urban General Ward; Stratford Māori Ward
- Electorates: Whanganui; Te Tai Hauāuru (Māori)

Government
  - Territorial Authority: Stratford District Council
  - Regional council: Taranaki Regional Council
  - Mayor of Stratford: Neil Volzke
  - Whanganui MP: Carl Bates
  - Te Tai Hauāuru MP: Debbie Ngarewa-Packer

Area
  - Urban: 8.90 km^{2} (3.44 sq mi)
  - District: 2,163.42 km^{2} (835.30 sq mi)
- Elevation: 310 m (1,020 ft)

Population (June 2025)
  - Urban: 6,430
  - Urban density: 722/km^{2} (1,870/sq mi)
  - District: 10,500
  - District density: 4.85/km^{2} (12.6/sq mi)
- Postcode: 4332
- Area code: 06

Stratford (Māori: Whakaahurangi) is the only town in Stratford District, and the seat of the Taranaki region, in New Zealand's North Island. It lies beneath the eastern slopes of Mount Taranaki, approximately halfway between New Plymouth and Hāwera, near the geographic centre of the Taranaki Region. The town has a population of 6,430, making it the 62nd largest urban area in New Zealand (using the Statistical Standard for Geographic Areas 2018 (SSGA18)), and the fourth largest in Taranaki (behind New Plymouth, Hāwera and Waitara).

The Stratford District has a population of 10,500, and a land area of 2,163.35 km^{2} (835.27 sq mi), which is divided between the Manawatū-Whanganui region (including the settlements of Whangamōmona, Marco and Tahora, 31.87% of its land area) and the Taranaki region (68.13% of its land area).

== Climate ==
Stratford has a temperate Oceanic climate (Köppen Climate Classification: Cfb)

Climate data for Stratford (1991–2020 normals, extremes 1960–present)
Month	Jan	Feb	Mar	Apr	May	Jun	Jul	Aug	Sep	Oct	Nov	Dec	Year
Record high °C (°F)	29.5 (85.1)	28.1 (82.6)	26.6 (79.9)	24.0 (75.2)	20.7 (69.3)	18.5 (65.3)	18.3 (64.9)	17.9 (64.2)	20.6 (69.1)	22.6 (72.7)	24.8 (76.6)	27.8 (82.0)	29.5 (85.1)
Mean maximum °C (°F)	25.8 (78.4)	25.4 (77.7)	23.7 (74.7)	21.2 (70.2)	18.6 (65.5)	15.8 (60.4)	15.2 (59.4)	16.2 (61.2)	17.7 (63.9)	19.8 (67.6)	22.1 (71.8)	23.7 (74.7)	26.9 (80.4)
Mean daily maximum °C (°F)	20.9 (69.6)	21.5 (70.7)	19.8 (67.6)	17.3 (63.1)	14.8 (58.6)	12.3 (54.1)	11.7 (53.1)	12.6 (54.7)	13.8 (56.8)	15.3 (59.5)	17.1 (62.8)	19.2 (66.6)	16.4 (61.4)
Daily mean °C (°F)	16.2 (61.2)	16.6 (61.9)	15.1 (59.2)	12.9 (55.2)	10.8 (51.4)	8.7 (47.7)	7.9 (46.2)	8.6 (47.5)	9.8 (49.6)	11.1 (52.0)	12.5 (54.5)	14.8 (58.6)	12.1 (53.8)
Mean daily minimum °C (°F)	11.5 (52.7)	11.7 (53.1)	10.3 (50.5)	8.5 (47.3)	6.9 (44.4)	5.1 (41.2)	4.1 (39.4)	4.7 (40.5)	5.8 (42.4)	7.0 (44.6)	8.0 (46.4)	10.4 (50.7)	7.8 (46.1)
Mean minimum °C (°F)	6.4 (43.5)	6.8 (44.2)	4.8 (40.6)	2.6 (36.7)	0.7 (33.3)	−0.6 (30.9)	−1.1 (30.0)	−0.7 (30.7)	0.6 (33.1)	1.3 (34.3)	2.6 (36.7)	5.4 (41.7)	−2.3 (27.9)
Record low °C (°F)	2.7 (36.9)	2.2 (36.0)	0.8 (33.4)	−0.3 (31.5)	−2.3 (27.9)	−5.5 (22.1)	−7.5 (18.5)	−4.6 (23.7)	−2.7 (27.1)	−1.9 (28.6)	−0.6 (30.9)	−0.3 (31.5)	−7.5 (18.5)
Average rainfall mm (inches)	108.9 (4.29)	121.5 (4.78)	123.2 (4.85)	157.8 (6.21)	198.7 (7.82)	193.6 (7.62)	199.9 (7.87)	200.4 (7.89)	190.5 (7.50)	202.8 (7.98)	141.9 (5.59)	154.2 (6.07)	1,993.4 (78.47)
Mean monthly sunshine hours	233.2	199.6	196.2	153.2	128.4	102.4	120.2	141.4	141.9	170.4	198.1	196.0	1,981
Source: NIWA

== Road and rail ==
Stratford is at the junction of State Highway 3 and State Highway 43.

On State Highway 3 New Plymouth is 39 km (24 mi) north, Inglewood 21 km (13 mi) north, Eltham 11 km (6.8 mi) south and Hāwera 30 km (19 mi) south.

On State Highway 43 Taumarunui is 146 km (91 mi) to the east. This road is known as "The Forgotten World Highway", due to the scarcity of settlement along the road in contrast to its earlier history. A sign reads "No Petrol for 150 km (93 mi)".

Stratford railway station is the junction of the Marton–New Plymouth and Stratford–Okahukura lines.

== Population ==
Stratford is a rural service centre, serving the agricultural economy of its wider hinterland.

The population of the district peaked in 1961 at 11,300, and until the end of the century the town fluctuated between 5229 (2001) and 5664 (1996). The 21st century has seen significant economic growth and some associated population growth in the town.

Stats NZ describes Stratford as a small urban area, which covers 8.90 km^{2} (3.44 sq mi). It had an estimated population of 6,430 as of June 2025, with a population density of 722 people per km^{2}.

Historical population
Year	Pop.	±% p.a.
2006	5,337	—
2013	5,493	+0.41%
2018	5,886	+1.39%
2023	6,330	+1.47%
The 2006 population is for a smaller area of 8.54 km^{2}. Source:

Stratford had a population of 6,330 in the 2023 New Zealand census, an increase of 444 people (7.5%) since the 2018 census, and an increase of 837 people (15.2%) since the 2013 census. There were 3,099 males, 3,219 females, and 15 people of other genders in 2,493 dwellings. 2.5% of people identified as LGBTIQ+. The median age was 40.6 years (compared with 38.1 years nationally). There were 1,248 people (19.7%) aged under 15 years, 1,071 (16.9%) aged 15 to 29, 2,655 (41.9%) aged 30 to 64, and 1,362 (21.5%) aged 65 or older.

People could identify as more than one ethnicity. The results were 88.0% European (Pākehā); 17.5% Māori; 2.2% Pasifika; 4.2% Asian; 0.4% Middle Eastern, Latin American and African New Zealanders (MELAA); and 3.1% other, which includes people giving their ethnicity as "New Zealander". English was spoken by 97.5%, Māori by 2.8%, Samoan by 0.2%, and other languages by 5.2%. No language could be spoken by 2.0% (e.g. too young to talk). New Zealand Sign Language was known by 0.7%. The percentage of people born overseas was 12.2, compared with 28.8% nationally.

Religious affiliations were 32.2% Christian, 0.7% Hindu, 0.2% Islam, 0.5% Māori religious beliefs, 0.2% Buddhist, 0.6% New Age, and 1.0% other religions. People who answered that they had no religion were 54.7%, and 10.0% of people did not answer the census question.

Of those at least 15 years old, 567 (11.2%) people had a bachelor's or higher degree, 2,979 (58.6%) had a post-high school certificate or diploma, and 1,542 (30.3%) people exclusively held high school qualifications. The median income was $34,000, compared with $41,500 nationally. 273 people (5.4%) earned over $100,000 compared to 12.1% nationally. The employment status of those at least 15 was 2,319 (45.6%) full-time, 654 (12.9%) part-time, and 141 (2.8%) unemployed.

Individual statistical areas
Name	Area (km^{2})	Population	Density (per km^{2})	Dwellings	Median age	Median income
Stratford North	3.42	2,169	634	840	41.0 years	$37,100
Stratford Central	2.77	2,175	785	924	43.0 years	$33,200
Stratford South	2.72	1,986	730	729	37.4 years	$31,600
New Zealand					38.1 years	$41,500

== History and culture ==
=== Whakaahurangi ===
The Māori name for Stratford is Whakaahurangi, meaning to look to the sky. The name is taken from a story of the Ngāti Ruanui chieftainess/Puhi Ariki named Rua-pū-tahanga who fled her husband Whatihua from Waikato, travelling the track known as Te ara tapu o Ruaputahanga which stretches from Urenui down through Tariki, and ends near Pātea. Here she stopped at the side of the Kahouri river near a fresh water spring. It is said she sat distraught and cried into the spring, naming it Te Puna Roimata o Ruaputahanga (The spring of Rua-pū-tahanga's tears), then camped overnight 3 km (1.9 mi) east of the current town. Being a clear night, Rua-pū-tahanga lay contemplating the stars when slumber overtook her. Withdrawing in respect, her followers observed that their chieftainess slept "with her face to the sky". The site continued to be used as a camping place for Māori, the track she followed linking the south Taranaki tribes to those in north Taranaki, and further north to Kawhia. Each travelling party would recollect the story of Rua-pū-tahanga sleeping with her face to the sky.

Whakaahurangi Marae, a marae (meeting ground) of the Ngāti Ruanui tribe and its Ahitahi sub-tribe, is located in Stratford. It includes a wharenui (meeting house), known as Te Whetū o Marama.

=== Surveying ===
There is no record of Māori settlement in the vicinity of Stratford. Before British settlement the area was covered in dense forest and swamp. The Vogel schemes of the 1870s provided the necessary impetus to lead to the construction of a railway line south of New Plymouth, and the creation of road access at the same time, to open up access to the rich soils under the mountain.

In 1876, Taranaki Waste Lands Board assistant surveyor Edwin Stanley Brookes, Jnr. cut a meridian line from Waitara to the site of Stratford, and oversaw the subdivision of a block between the Manganui River and the Pātea River. The surveying of a new site for a town on the banks of the Pātea River was authorised on 11 June 1877, and the northern half of the town (above the Pātea River) was laid out by William Skinner in July. More lots were laid out by Peter Cheal in 1879, and in 1880 Skinner was directed to survey the southern half of the town.

=== Naming ===
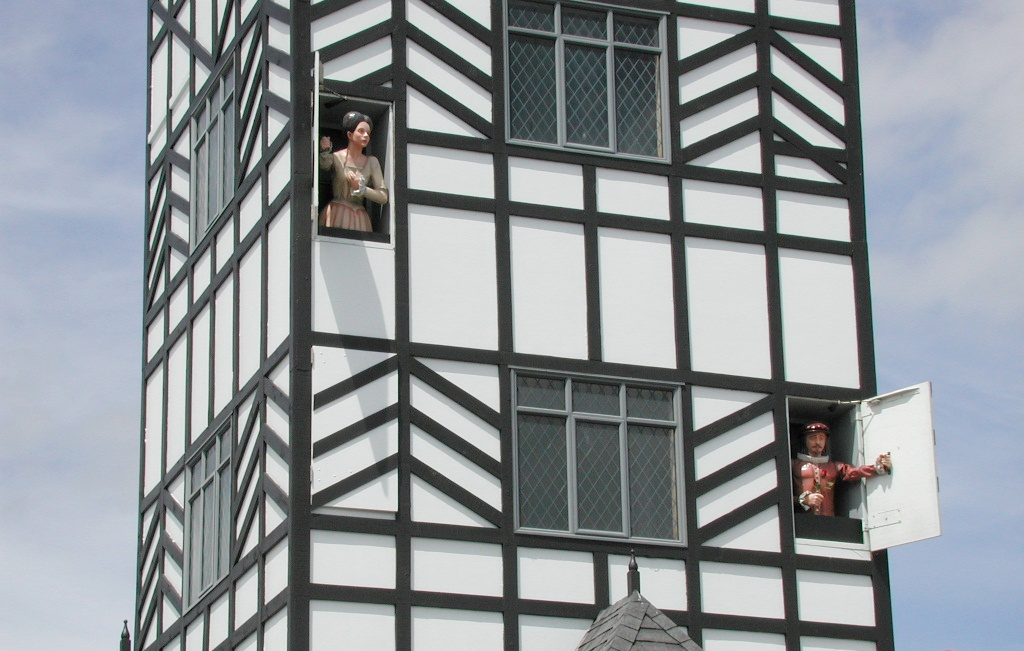
Stratford clock tower "glockenspiel"

On 3 December 1877, the name Stratford-upon-Patea was adopted, on the motion of William Crompton of the Taranaki Waste Lands Board. The town was named after Stratford-upon-Avon due to similarities of the Pātea River and the River Avon in Warwickshire. The connection to William Shakespeare's hometown led to the naming of 67 streets after Shakespearian characters from 27 of his plays.

Today New Zealand's only glockenspiel clock tower plays the balcony scene from Romeo and Juliet three times a day. The spoken words are provided via external loudspeakers - there is no carillon (multiple bells) as would be more typical for glockenspiels in towers.

=== Settlement and growth ===
Stratford was formally classified as a town in June 1878, and on 31 August 1878 an auction of 455 sections saw the first sections sold. By 1881 the population was 97, comprising 56 males and 41 females, with 22 houses. By 1891 this had grown to a population of 342 and by 1896 1,256. This growth continued steadily until the mid-late 20th century, and has since fluctuated between 5229 (2001) and 5664 (1996), numbering 5,337 at the last census.

=== Institutional history ===
The first Stratford Town Board was formed in 1882. The Stratford County Council was formed in 1890, and the Stratford Borough Council was formed on 22 July 1898. In the same year, Stratford became the third town in New Zealand to have electric street lighting, on the initiative of inventor and entrepreneur Alexander Walker Reid. The county and borough councils amalgamated on 1 April 1989 to form the Stratford District Council, which was reconstituted on 1 November 1989 as part of the nationwide restructure in local government.

=== Historic building ===
The Kings Theatre was given Category I status by Heritage New Zealand in 2024.

=== Stratford Shakespeare Festival ===
The Stratford Shakespeare Festival takes place in various venues across Stratford in April each year. It is presented by the Stratford Shakespeare Trust.

== Schools ==
There are two secondary schools in Stratford:

- Stratford High School is a coeducational secondary (years 9-13) school with a roll of 701. The school was founded in 1897 and celebrated its centenary in 1997.
- Taranaki Diocesan School for Girls is a state integrated Anglican girls' secondary (years 9-13) school with a roll of 101. The school was founded in 1914 and moved to its present site in 1917. Most of the students are boarders. The school's name changed from St Mary's Diocesan School in 2018.

There are three primary schools within Stratford township:

- Stratford Primary School has a roll of 430. The school was founded in 1882 and celebrated 125 years in 2007.
- Avon School has a roll of 56. It opened in 1959.
- St Joseph's School is a state integrated Catholic school with a roll of 153. It opened in 1897.

All these primary schools are coeducational and accept students for years 1–8. Rolls are as of July 2026.

== Parks and reserves ==
Stratford has a number of public parks and reserves, with names reflecting its English and Māori heritage;

- King Edward Park
- Victoria Park
- Windsor Park
- Kopuatama Cemetery

== Born or lived in Stratford ==
=== Sports people ===
- Mark "Bull" Allen (born 1967), All Black, TV host
- Lisa Allpress (born 1975), female jockey
- Christine Arthur (born 1963), New Zealand field hockey player
- Arthur Collins (1906–1988), All Black
- Carlin Davison (born 2003), basketball player
- Tiana Davison (born 2000), rugby league player
- John Graham (born 1935), All Black, NZRU president, NZ cricket team manager, Auckland University Chancellor, Auckland Grammar School headmaster, businessman
- Stan Lay (1906–2003) Olympic Javelin thrower (born in New Plymouth)
- Dave Loveridge (born 1952), former All Black
- John McCullough (born 1936), All Black
- Lane Penn, representative rugby footballer, coach, All Black selector and NZRU President
- Mark Robinson (born 1974), former All Black and current NZ Rugby CEO
- Ned Shewry (1889–1962), world champion woodchopper
- Alan Smith (born 1942), All Black
- Jeremiah Trueman (born 1987), New Zealand national basketball representative

=== Literature, art and culture ===
- Sylvia Ashton-Warner (1908–1984), novelist, autobiographer and educational pioneer
- Janet Frame (1924-2004), writer
- Michael Hight (born 1961), artist - painter
- Janet Hunt (born 1951), non-fiction writer
- Michele Leggott (born 1956), poet and literary scholar
- Dominic Sheehan, author of Finding Home, a novel that illustrates growing up in Stratford
- Cheryll Sotheran (1945-2017), founder of the Museum of New Zealand Te Papa Tongarewa

=== Medicine ===
- John Daniel Bergin (1921–1995), physician and neurologist, Catholic pro-life apologist
- Mel Brieseman, missionary to India, Canterbury Medical Officer of Health
- Doris Gordon (1890–1956), doctor and obstetrician
- Graham Gordon (1927–2004), surgeon, St John's officer, NZMA Council Chairman and NZMA President

=== Law, government and politics ===
- Peter Gordon (1921 – 1991), National Party politician
- David Thomson (1915–1999), Minister of Defence and Minister of Justice in the Third National Government of New Zealand
- Venn Young (1929–1993), Cabinet minister in the Muldoon National Government and homosexual rights activist

=== Academics ===
- Alice Copping (1906–1982), senior lecturer in nutrition, Queen Elizabeth College, University of London
- Dr Alan Kirton (1933–2001), agricultural scientist
- Jack Tizard (1919–1979), professor of child development, University of London

=== Other ===
- Brian Davis, (1934–1998), Archbishop of New Zealand
- Emily Stevens (1900–1967), wholesale florist, nurserywoman, iris hybridiser
