= Patrick Vaughan Stanley Heenan =

British Indian Army officer, alleged spy for Japan in World War II

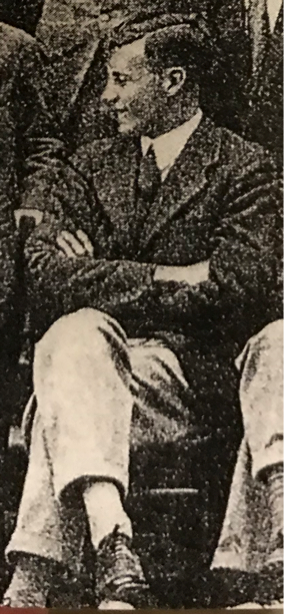
- Born: Patrick Vaughan Stanley; 29 July 1910; Reefton, New Zealand
- Died: 13 February 1942 (aged 31); Keppel Harbour, Singapore, Straits Settlements
- Cause of death: Summary execution
- Military career
- Allegiance: United Kingdom; Empire of Japan (Alleged)
- Branch: British Indian Army
- Service years: 1932–1942
- Rank: Captain
- Units: 16th Punjab Regiment; Indian Army Service Corps; 300 Air Liaison Section, Malaya
- Conflicts: World War II; Battle of Malaya (executed)

Patrick Vaughan Stanley Heenan (29 July 1910 – 13 February 1942) was a New Zealand military officer and spy. A captain in the British Indian Army, he was convicted of treason after spying for Japan during the Battle of Malaya of World War II. Heenan was executed by his wardens while in British custody during the Battle of Singapore. With the defeat of the British imminent, Heenan had mocked the guards, saying he would soon be free, while they would be the prisoners. In response, British military police shot him and dumped his body into the harbour.

According to Heenan's biographer, Peter Elphick, these events were suppressed by British Commonwealth military censors.

== Early life ==
Heenan's mother, Annie Stanley (born 1882), was not married at the time of her son's birth at Reefton, New Zealand. His birth certificate recorded her maiden name as his surname, and did not include any information about his father. A year later, both mother and son moved to Burma with a mining engineer named George Charles Heenan (1855–1912). The older Heenan is described by some sources as an Irish republican, although he seems to have had a long association with New Zealand, including selection for regional representative cricket teams in the 1880s and 1890s. There is no conclusive evidence that George Heenan was Patrick's father, or that George and Anne ever married. However, Patrick was baptised in Burma as a Roman Catholic, with the surname Heenan. George Heenan died at Pauk, Burma, in 1912. Patrick's mother then worked as a governess for a family named Carroll.

In 1922, the Carrolls moved to England, and Anne Stanley went with them. Mrs Carroll died a few years later, and Bernard Carroll, who was an accountant, married Anne. From 1923 to 1926, Patrick was a boarder at Sevenoaks School in Kent, and in 1927 proceeded to Cheltenham College, as a day boy, in a stream of students preparing for military careers. Although he was then 16 years old, at Cheltenham he was put in classes with pupils as young as 13.

Accounts of his time at Sevenoaks and Cheltenham show Heenan to have been a poor student and – in the words of the Dictionary of National Biography – a "gloomy, resentful misfit disliked by other pupils". He nevertheless excelled at sports, especially boxing, due largely to his impressive physique. According to Elphick, Heenan was unpopular with other students at Cheltenham and was often in trouble with school authorities. Although he joined the Junior Division, Officers Training Corps (OTC) at Cheltenham, Heenan did not gain any formal qualifications; because of this, he was not able to be admitted to British Army officer training, when he left school at the age of 19. Heenan instead joined Steel Brothers, a trading company with interests in Asia.

== Military career ==
In the early 1930s, Heenan applied for the Army Supplementary Reserve, the only way he could become an officer without formal qualifications. According to Elphick, had Heenan's illegitimacy been known, it would have prevented him becoming an officer. He was able to join the reserve by presenting his baptism certificate, along with a certificate signed by his school headmaster, stating that Heenan was capable of performing the duties of an officer. This was endorsed by the commander of Cheltenham College's OTC.

In 1933, he was commissioned into the Supplementary Reserve. In 1935, Heenan was transferred to the British Indian Army, with the service number 547/AI. His parents' address at this time was recorded as Cheam, Surrey, England. He was put on the Indian Army's Unattached List, and was sent to India. After six months' training with a British regiment, Heenan was not accepted by any Indian Army regiments. He had to do an additional six months with another British regiment before being accepted by the 16th Punjab Regiment. He reportedly performed well in a skirmish on the North-West Frontier, but was later transferred to the Indian Army Service Corps. According to Elphick, this was a device commonly used to get unsatisfactory officers away from prestigious frontline regiments. However, Heenan later returned to the 16th Punjabs.

In 1936–37, Heenan took a six-month "long leave" in Japan.

During 1941, as fears of a Japanese invasion of Southeast Asia grew, Heenan's unit was sent to Malaya. He was transferred to an Indian Army Air Liaison Unit and was sent to Singapore for training. Following the completion of air liaison training, Heenan was stationed at Alor Setar, in Kedah, northern Malaya, in June 1941. It was in this area that most of the British Royal Air Force, Royal Australian Air Force and Royal New Zealand Air Force squadrons in Malaya were based.

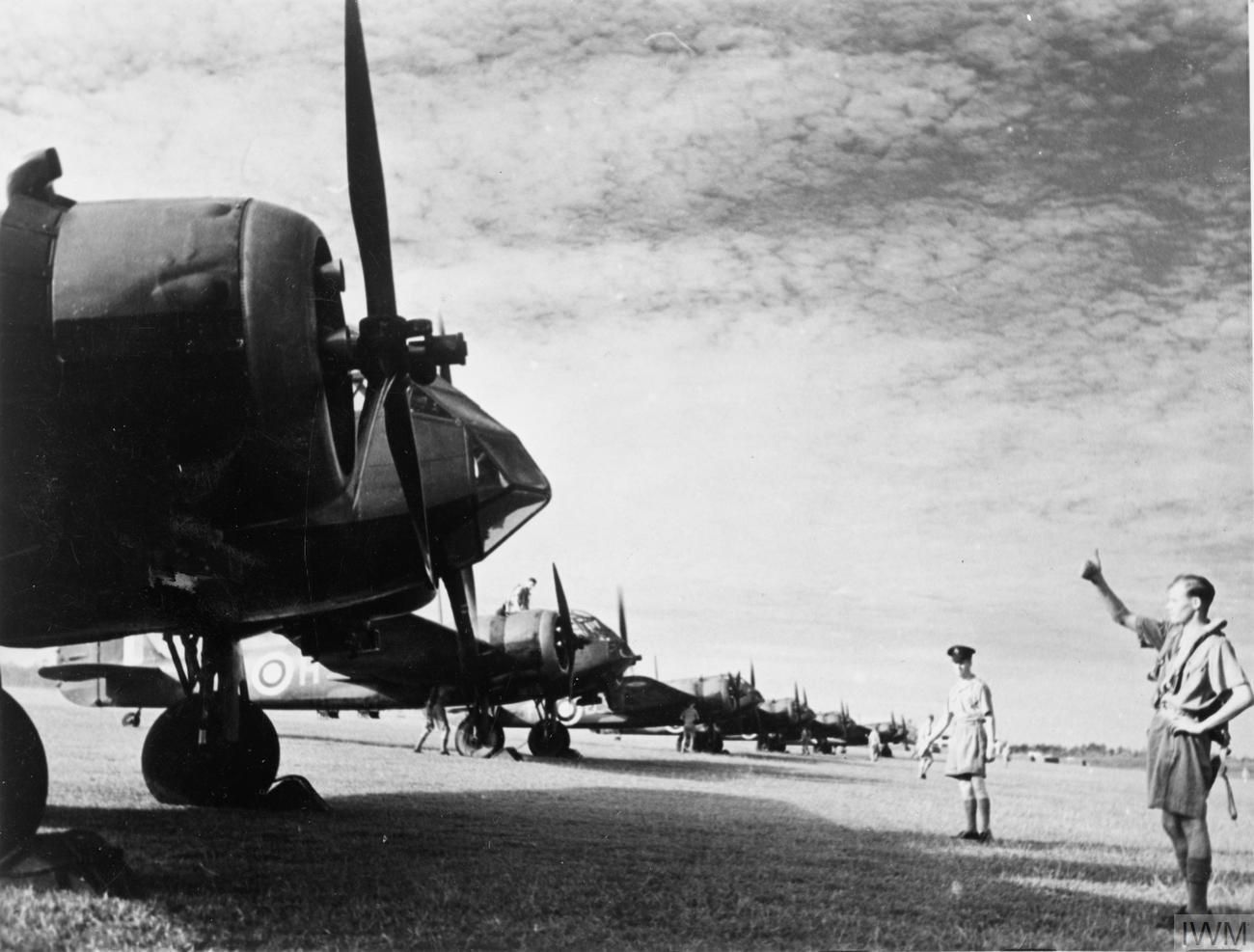
Circa 8 February 1941. Bristol Blenheim Mark I bombers of No. 62 Squadron RAF lined up at Tengah, Singapore, before flying north to their new base at Alor Star, Kedah. Heenan was attached to the squadron at Alor Star in late 1941.

Japanese forces invaded Thailand and Malaya on 8 December. Sydney Tavender, chairman of the Cotswold branch of the Far East Prisoners of War, and who served in the AIL unit with Heenan, said the Japanese aircraft always seemed to know the correct recognition codes, despite the fact that they were changed every 24 hours. By 10 December, the Japanese had destroyed most of the Allied aircraft in northern Malaya.

Heenan was caught during an air raid. "When we discovered he wasn't in the slit trenches with us we became suspicious," Tavender reported. "We went to his quarters and discovered a radio, which was still warm. That was the last we saw of him. He was arrested." The Japanese air raids were assisted by radio transmissions made by Heenan. Among other espionage equipment, he reportedly had a morse code transmitter operated by an alphanumeric keyboard – similar to a Traeger Transceiver – which was disguised as a typewriter. Heenan was sent to Singapore, and was reportedly court-martialled in January 1942. He does not seem to have been formally sentenced, but the normal sentence for treason by British officers was death.

Heenan remained in custody at Singapore for several weeks. The Japanese gradually drove the Allies out of Malaya, and on 8 February they attacked Singapore Island. Within days, it became clear that the battle was being won by the Japanese. In the words of journalist and author Lynette Silver (whose main source is Elphick):

By 13 February[,] Heenan had become very cocky, taunting his guards ... that he would soon be free and they would be prisoners. It appears that ... British military police took matters into their own hands. After cards were cut to decide who would ... [kill] Heenan, it is alleged he was taken to the dockside, where a sergeant executed him with a single pistol shot to the back of the head. The body was then dumped in the harbour.

Elphick also says that Heenan was shot at Keppel Harbour.

== Effects and aftermath ==
Military historian Brian P. Farrell believes that Heenan could not have done decisive damage to the Allies but probably cost No. 62 Squadron some personnel and aircraft. Elphick suggests that the British Commonwealth air forces would have been defeated without Heenan's help; their aircraft in Malaya were inadequate compared to the Japanese and airfields in northern Malaya had been located in positions that were for all intents and purposes not capable of being defended. Elphick added that Heenan "must have passed on much helpful information pre-war and he pushed the rate of aircraft destruction along a bit after the war began". Elphick also says that word of Heenan's actions spread quickly among British Commonwealth officers, which had a significant effect on morale.

By 1998, the families of other personnel listed on the Commonwealth War Graves Commission World War II memorial at Kranji War Cemetery in Singapore were requesting the removal of Heenan's name. His date of death on the memorial, 15 February 1942, was reportedly a standard date assigned to all Commonwealth personnel officially listed as missing during the Battle of Singapore.

== See also ==
- Velvalee Dickinson – American spy for Japan during World War II
- John Semer Farnsworth – American spy for Japan in the 1930s
- Harry Thompson (spy) – American spy for Japan in the 1930s
- Norman Baillie-Stewart – British spy for Germany during World War II
- Arthur Owens – suspected British spy for Germany during World War II
- Eddie Chapman – British double agent during World War II
- William Colepaugh – American spy for Germany during World War II
- Tyler Kent – American spy for Germany in the early 1940s
