= Waipuku railway station =

Railway station in Waipuku

Waipuku

General information
- Location: Mountain Road; New Zealand
- Coordinates: 39°16′7.464″S 174°15′23.8284″E
- Elevation: 340 metres (1,120 ft)
- System: New Zealand Government Railways (NZGR); Regional rail
- Lines: Marton–New Plymouth line Mount Egmont Branch
- Platforms: Single side
- Tracks: 1

Construction
- Structure type: at-grade
- Architectural style: Vogel Class-6

History
- Opened: 17 December 1879
- Closed: by October 1955 (passengers); 2 June 1963 (freight)
Location
Notes
- Previous Station: Midhirst Station; Next Station : Tariki Station

Waipuku Railway Station was a rural railway station on the Marton–New Plymouth Line in the Taranaki region of New Zealand, serving the small farming community of Waipuku about 9 km north of Stratford. The station opened in late 1879 during the southern extension of the railway from New Plymouth, and it remained in service until closing to all traffic in 1963. Waipuku was also the junction for the short Mount Egmont Branch line, which provided railway access to a quarry on Mount Taranaki for sourcing ballast and road metal.

== History ==
Waipuku station was opened on 17 December 1879 as part of the early construction of the regional railway line through central Taranaki. In its early years it was a modest wayside stop, equipped with a simple shelter shed and a short passenger platform by the mid-1890s. A small goods loop was provided to allow trains to pass or shunt wagons; initially, the loop could hold about 16 wagons, and this was later extended to around 24 wagons by the turn of the century, with a short backshunt for additional capacity. The station primarily served local farms, handling agricultural produce and supplies in the surrounding rural district. It was one of several small stops on the Marton–New Plymouth route in this era, spaced a few kilometres apart.

=== Junction Station ===
In the early 20th century, Waipuku gained greater importance as the junction for the Mount Egmont Branch. This branch line, authorized in 1904, left the main line at Waipuku to climb toward Mount Taranaki. Construction of the branch began in 1906, and by April 1908 the first section (reaching a stone crushing plant near the Manganui River) was completed and handed over for operations. The 11 km branch was built to tap a hard rock quarry on the mountain, supplying crushed stone for railway ballast and road metal in Taranaki and Whanganui.

At its peak, about 60 men worked at the quarry, producing up to 40 wagonloads of rock each day for shipment from Waipuku station. To support these operations, the Railways Department upgraded Waipuku's facilities: a small locomotive engine shed was erected in 1906 along with water tanks, a coal stage, and several workers’ cottages for the branch crew. The station yard trackage was expanded with additional sidings, including the branch line itself, which trailed off the crossing loop. Waipuku thus briefly became a busy junction, with ballast trains regularly running from the mountain down to the main line. The Mount Egmont Branch saw its busiest years in the 1910s, but activity dwindled after World War I. The quarry's output declined as alternative rock sources became available, and by the mid-1920s the branch was little used. It was formally closed in 1938 (having been effectively dormant for some time) and the remaining track was removed during World War II.

=== Decline & Close ===
Once the ballast traffic ceased, Waipuku returned to being a quiet rural station. The engine shed and other branch-specific facilities became redundant. By the 1940s, Waipuku was only infrequently used for local traffic. In 1955 passenger services were withdrawn from Waipuku as part of a wider reduction in rural stops. The station building was dismantled around 1957, and Waipuku was finally closed completely on 2 June 1963, ending its 84 years of operation.

== Waipuku Stream Bridge ==
Designations

Heritage New Zealand – Category 2
- Official name: Waipuku Railway Bridge
- Designated: 1st September 1983
- Reference no.: 878

The Waipuku Stream Bridge was constructed in 1879 along with the original railway line. Featuring distinctive masonry piers and arches at either end, the original bridge span was an 80-foot (24.4m) long under-strutted timber truss. This was replaced in 1911 with the current intermediate concrete pier and two 40 foot (12.2m) steel plate girder spans.

In 1966 considerable repairs (estimated at £6,500) were required after two local men in their twenties ‘decided to blow up the bridge’. The blast was heard in Stratford and ‘ripped out a section of the bridge’. On 1 September 1983 it was listed with the Historic Places Trust (Now Heritage New Zealand Pouhere Taonga) as an Historic Place Category 2.

== Manganui Station ==
Manganui railway station was located 1 mile south of Waipuku station, close to the crossing of the Manganui River. It opened along with the rest of the stretch of railway on 17 December 1879, and was furnished with a shelter shed, passenger platform, cart approach, loading bank, and a loop that held 13 wagons. The station was big enough to show on local timetables of the day as stops on request. In June of the next year, land was taken close to the station for a ballast pit to provide metal. In 1889, the Egmont Sash and Door Company and J.K. Cameron both asked for permission to run their tramways across the railway at Manganui to connect to their sawmills. There was also a recommendation to change the station's name to York Road, which was declined.

By 1892, with falling traffic, it was recommended to close the station, and despite a petition to keep it open for good traffic, on 1 September 1897, the station was closed, with traffic directed to nearby Waipuku or Midhirst stations.

== Today ==
Nothing remains of the former Waipuku station. The site, adjacent to State Highway 3 (Mountain Road), has reverted to farmland with only the main railway line still running through. No station structures or sidings are visible today. The Mount Egmont Branch's formation can still be traced in Egmont National Park as the York Road Loop Track, but at Waipuku junction itself there are few tangible remnants of the once-busy ballast quarry railway. Trains on the Marton–New Plymouth Line continue to pass the location without stopping, and the story of Waipuku survives only in records and local history.
