= Tariki railway station =

Railway station in Tariki

Tariki
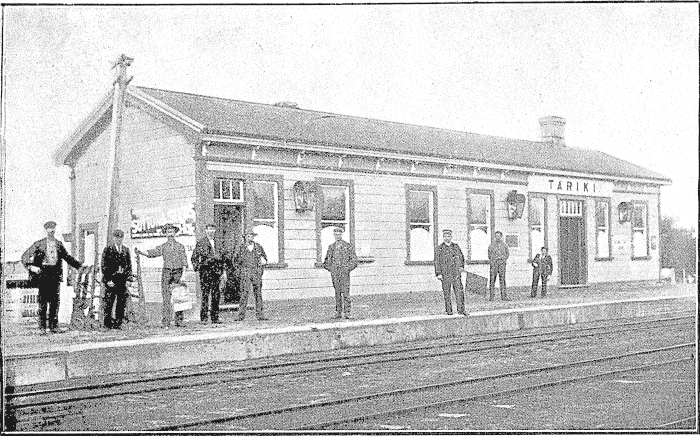
- The combined Railway Station and Post Office located in Taraki, Taranaki, in 1904

General information
- Other names: Tariki Road
- Location: Mountain Road; Tariki 4390; New Zealand
- Coordinates: 39°14′8.29392″S 174°14′37.39092″E
- Elevation: 290 metres (950 ft)
- System: New Zealand Government Railways (NZGR); Regional rail
- Line: Marton–New Plymouth line
- Platforms: Single side
- Tracks: 1

Construction
- Structure type: at-grade

History
- Opened: 17 December 1879
- Closed: 26 March 1977 (all traffic)
- Rebuilt: August 1902
Location
Notes
- Previous Station: Waipuku Station; Next Station : Norfolk Road Station

Tariki Railway Station, originally named Tariki Road, was a rural railway station on the Marton–New Plymouth Line in the Taranaki region of New Zealand, serving the small farming community of Tariki between Inglewood and Stratford. The station opened 17 December 1879 as part of the railway's extension south from Inglewood. Tariki remained in operation for nearly a century before closing to all traffic in 1977. The station building has been relocated and is now preserved.

== History ==
Tariki station was opened on 17 December 1879 as part of the early construction of the regional railway line through central Taranaki. In its early years, it was a small facility, with a simple shelter shed and a single loop capable of holding 34 wagons. This slowly grew - by 1900 the station featured two loops (62 and 25 wagon capacity), a cart approach, urinals, sheep yards and a private siding for the New Plymouth Sash & Door Factory. There were also complaints that the station was inadequate in size.

In 1902 the shelter shed was replaced by a new railway station building, including general and ladies' waiting rooms, a station office and post office. The station was renamed as simply Tariki at the same time and a dedicated stationmaster appointed.

As both local roads and the railway got busier, frustrations began to mount at trains delaying motorists at level crossings. The original Mountain Road level crossing was close to the southern end of the passenger platform. This was especially a problem when trains were crossing, blocking the crossing for some time. By late 1936 work was done to build a new road on the eastern side of the railway between Tariki and Waipuku, removing two level crossings from the main highway.

=== Post Office ===
Like many rural railway stations, a post office operated at Tariki station. The Postal Department first inquired in 1895 about combining the post office and railway station on one site, which occurred in 1902. It was first opened under Railways Department management, then transferred to the Postal Department on 1 April 1929. This was short lived, as by December 1931 the post office was back under the control of Railways Department staff.

It continued in the building until June 1962, shortly before the station was closed as an officer station, but was reopened briefly (again run by railway staff) between 1967 and early 1968.

== Decline & Closure ==
By the mid-20th century, traffic through Tariki station had started to decline. Being on a main highway, goods and passengers moved to road transportation as quicker and easier. In 1962 Tariki was closed as an officered station, and on 26 March 1977 it was closed to all traffic.

The railway station building was sold and moved to The Pioneer Village south of Stratford, which has recently been formed. The rest of the station infrastructure and trackace was removed.

== Today ==
At the old Tariki station site alongside Mountain Road (State Highway 3), little evidence remains of the former stop. The railway line through Tariki is still an active part of the Marton–New Plymouth route for freight trains, but it now runs through without stopping. The former crossing loop and any sidings have been lifted, leaving only the single main line track.

One notable remnant of the station's railway infrastructure is a double-track bridge at the north end of the site – originally built to carry Tariki's crossing loop alongside the main line over a stream – which still stands today, though it now carries only the single through track. Aside from the repurposed station building now residing at Pioneer Village, the Tariki locale has no station structures left; the platform and signage are gone, and the surrounding area has reverted to farmland.
