= Heenan =

Heenan is a surname of Irish origin. Notable people with the surname include:

- Ben Heenan (born 1990), American footballer
- Bobby Heenan (1944–2017), American wrestler
- Brian Heenan (born 1937), Australian Roman Catholic bishop
- Catherine Heenan, American journalist
- Daniel Heenan (born 1981), Australian rugby player
- Deirdre Heenan, academic
- Donald Heenan (1908–1961), New Zealand cricketer
- Eric Heenan (born 1945), Australian lawyer
- Eric Heenan (politician) (1900–1998), Australian politician
- George Heenan (1855–1912), New Zealand cricketer
- Jake Heenan (born 1992), New Zealand rugby player
- Jerry Heenan (1941-2010), Canadian professional wrestler
- Joe Heenan (1888–1951), New Zealand law draftsman
- John Heenan (disambiguation), several persons
- Katie Heenan (born 1985), American gymnast
- Maurice Heenan (1912–2000), New Zealand lawyer
- Mick Heenan, Australian professional rugby union coach
- Patrick Heenan (disambiguation), several persons
- Paul Heenan, the guitarist of the American rock band Monovox
- Peter Brian Heenan, (born 1961), New Zealand botanist
- Peter Heenan (1875–1948), Canadian politician
- Roy Heenan (1935–2017), Canadian lawyer

== See also ==
- Heenan & Froude, a United Kingdom-based engineering company
- Heenan Blaikie LLP, Canadian law firm
- The Heenan Family, a stable of wrestlers
- Heenan Highway, part of Ontario Highway 71, Canada
