= List of historic places in Stratford District =

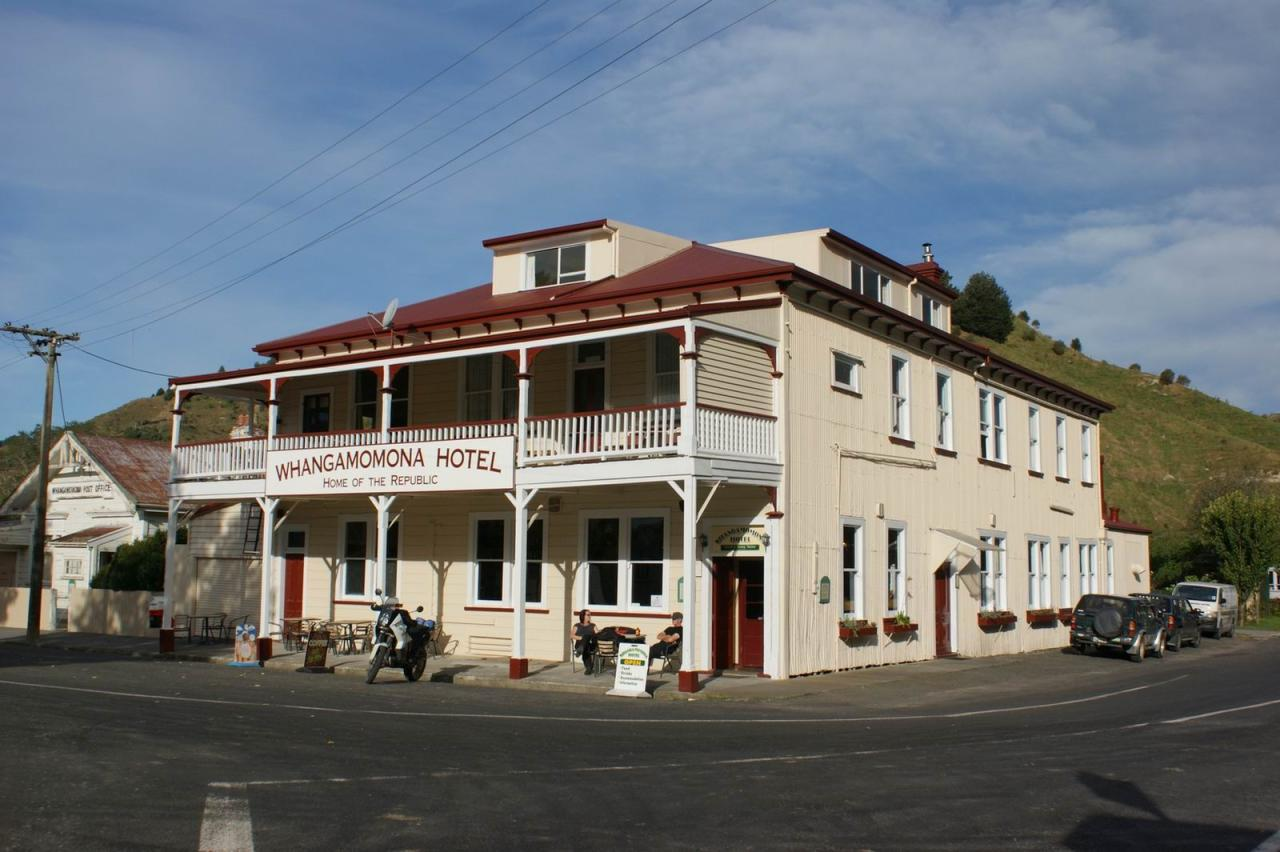
The Dominion Breweries Hotel, a Category 2 historic place in Whangamōmona

The Stratford District is a territorial authority of New Zealand split between the North Island regions of Taranaki and Manawatū-Whanganui. The region was initially populated by seasonal Māori villages. European colonisation did not penetrate into the hilly and isolated inland region until the end of the New Zealand Wars in the 1860s. The eponymous town of Stratford was founded in 1877 and named after Stratford-upon-Avon, the English hometown of William Shakespeare. The region became a centre of dairy production during the early twentieth century, with factories emerging in most rural settlements. Services centralised in the larger settlements following road and rail improvements in the mid-twentieth century, leading to the decline of many of the smaller villages.

Heritage New Zealand classification of sites on the New Zealand Heritage List / Rārangi Kōrero, in accordance with the Heritage New Zealand Pouhere Taonga Act 2014, distinguishes between Category 1 ("places of special or outstanding historical or cultural significance") and Category 2 ("places of historic or cultural significance"). Sites important to Māori communities are given special classifications, although none of these sites are located within Stratford District itself. Twelve sites on the New Zealand Heritage List are located within Stratford District. Six are located within Stratford itself, while the others are located in Ngaere, Whangamōmona, and Douglas.

== Sites ==
List of historic places in Stratford District
Name	Classification	Location	Constructed	Registered	List number	Notes	Image	Ref.
The King's Theatre	Category 1	213–215, Broadway, Stratford	1917	2024	9865	A two-storey movie theatre first opened in 1917. In January 1925, it was the site of the first demonstration of sound films in the Southern Hemisphere; these began screening regularly by 1929. It fell into decline following the rise of popular television in the late twentieth century, and was closed in 1988. A community trust purchased the building as a performing arts venue in 1991, with movie screenings resuming the following year.	A photo of a two-storey movie theatre storefront	
Egmont Chambers	Category 1	11 Fenton Street, Stratford	1920	2020	9737	A two-storey concrete office building designed by local architect John D. Healey in Stripped Classical style. Initially commissioned by the law firm Rutherfurd, Macalister and Coleman, it continued to be used for legal and accounting firms until 2016, when it was refurbished and converted into a community space featuring an art gallery, cafe, and distillery.		
Triumph Dairy Factory (former)	Category 2	30A Finnerty Road, Ngaere	1914	1983	930	A concrete 12-vat dairy processing facility built in 1914 for the Ngaere Co-operative Dairy Company, replacing an earlier wooden building. It became locally known for producing "big cheese" for fairs and shows, massive wheels of cheese containing £12 worth of coins. Four one-ton cheeses were showcased at the 1924 British Empire Exhibition in London. After the Ngaere Company amalgamated with the Taranaki Dairy Company in 1973, the factory continued to be used as a branch facility until 1977, when it closed. It was used as a warehouse, clothing factory, indoor cricket court, rave hall, and saw mill before its conversion to an addiction rehabilitation centre.	A photo of a rural and worn dairy factory	
Butcher's Shop (former)	Category 2	Ohura Road (State Highway 43), Whangamōmona	1943	1983	928	Wood and iron structure first built in 1902 by the McCluggage brothers, eight years after the town was founded. It was demolished during a fire in 1943 and rebuilt shortly afterwards. It closed in 1970 following lessened business as the town's population declined. It is currently abandoned and unmaintained.	A picture of derelict butcher shop with forested, hilly environs	
Dominion Breweries Hotel	Category 2	Whangamomona Road, Whangamōmona	1911	1983	927	A pub and hotel constructed from timber and corrugated iron in 1911, replacing a 1901 building that burnt down the previous year; only the kitchen coal range survived. It served as a hospital during the Spanish flu in 1919 and was repurposed as a pub during the Great Depression. It was only used as a pub from 1975 to 1984 due to declining population. It was the site of the declaration of the town as a republic in 1989 after the community was divided between the Manawatū-Whanganui and Taranaki regions. After years of decline, it was purchased by new owners in 2004 and refurbished, with an additional use as a live music venue.	A photo of a two-storey hotel with white sidings and a red roof	
Douglas Boarding House (former)	Category 2	1664 Ohura Road, Douglas	1906	1983	926	Located along the Forgotten World Highway, the timber building was built in 1906 as a lodging house and restaurant by a local farmer. It was used as a temporary hospital during the Spanish Flu. In 1928, it lost its restaurant license, and was converted into employee housing by the nearby Douglas Dairy Company in 1943. The factory closed in 1958 and briefly used as employee housing by a brickworks. The building was vacated in the 1960s; after use as a shop by a toy-maker, a silversmith, and a herbal pharmacist, it is now a private residence.		
Thompson, O'Neil and Clifford Limited Building	Category 2	Fenton Street, Stratford	1914	1983	925	A single-storey brick office also known as Otago Chambers. It was designed in 1914 by John D. Healy for the law firm Halliwell and Thomson.	A photo of an old brick storefront. It has a sign reading OTAGO CHAMBERS.	
Municipal Chambers (former)	Category 2	Broadway, Stratford	1916	1983	924	A former town hall built in 1916 to replace an earlier hall which had burnt down two years prior. As a war memorial, a "Hall of Remembrance" was constructed in the building and opened in 1920 by Edward, Prince of Wales. Another display honoring local World War II soldiers was unveiled on Anzac Day, 1951. It ceased to be used as a town hall following the borough council's amalgamation with the Stratford Council in 1989.	A photo of a two-storey building with white paneling and red highlights taken from across a street. A sign at the top reads Municipal Building. Signs for various stores line the first floor of the building	
Memorial Gates	Category 2	Regan Street, Victoria Park, Stratford	1926	1983	922	A set of metal gates between two stone pillars. Erected on Anzac Day 1926 as a memorial for the deceased soldiers of World War I, they were financed by a memorial committee fundraiser and inaugurated by Major General Andrew Hamilton Russell. Plaques commemorating the soldiers are on each pillar, while centrepieces resembling medals are built into the gates, with the names of four theatres of World War I: France, Gallipoli, Samoa, and Palestine.		
Malone Memorial Arch and Gates	Category 2	King Edward Park, Fenton Street and Portia Street, Stratford	1923	1983	921	A plastered concrete archway featuring a set of gates, flanked by two smaller side gates. The gates were originally wooden, but were replaced by iron gates at some point after 1986. They were designed by John Alfred Duffill of the firm Duffill & Gibson and inaugurated by the Wellington Battalion in 1923. They are dedicated to the battalion's commander William George Malone, who was killed at the Battle of Chunuk Bair during the Gallipoli campaign.	A large concrete archway with an iron gate, leading into a forested park	
McCluggage Bros. General Stores Building (former)	Category 2	6022 Ohura Road (State Highway 43), Whangamōmona	1901	1983	919	A former general store built in 1901 by A. W. Hodder. During the early 1900s, it was the largest store in the district, employing 23 staff. A steady decline in population and business over the mid-twentieth century led to the store's closure in 1967. It has remained unused since.	An old-fashioned storefront with a sign reading McCluggage Bros. in a rural environment	
Waipuku Stream Bridge	Category 2	Marton–New Plymouth line, Tariki	1879	1983	878	A rail bridge designed by David Glendinning in 1879, situated between Stratford and New Plymouth District. Initially an 80 ft (24 m) timber truss bridge, it was replaced by two 40 ft (12 m) steel spans with an intermediate concrete pier in 1911. Masonry piers and arches in the original timber design were retained in the newer bridge. The bridge suffered significant damage after two men attempted to destroy it with explosives in 1966.		
Downdraught Kiln	Category 1	24 Douglas Road, Douglas Brickworks, Douglas	1937	1985	152	A kiln erected by brickmaker Alfred Emeny in 1937, replacing a more costly Hoffmann kiln following a downturn in brick demand after the 1931 Hawke's Bay earthquake. Made of brick, it contains a single firing chamber with a round roof, connected to the previous kiln's chimney. It was mainly used to fire roof tiles. The brickworks closed in 1981; the Hoffman kiln was demolished, but the downdraught kiln was saved by its new owners, and registered with the New Zealand Historic Places Trust. A protective shelter was built on top of the kiln in 1988.		

== Former site ==
This site was formerly listed on the New Zealand Heritage List, but is no longer extant.

Former historic places in Stratford District
Name	Classification	Location	Constructed	Registered	List number	Notes	Ref.
Mangaotuku Truss Bridge	Category 2	State Highway 3, Stratford	1905	-	920	A Pratt truss bridge built around 1905. Before its destruction by a flood in February 2011, it was one of two surviving bridges of its design in New Zealand.	
