= Harry Thompson (spy) =

American Navy sailor and interwar spy for Japan

Harry Thomas Thompson (September 13, 1909 – September 24, 1960) was a former United States Navy yeoman who spied for Japan against the United States in 1934–35, during the interwar period. He was the first American to be convicted of espionage after World War I.

== Espionage ==
Thompson had been a Maryland farm boy who served one cruise with the Navy; however in the summer of 1934 he was jobless, making him a good target for recruiting. His handler was an officer of the Imperial Japanese Navy, Lt. Cmdr. Toshio Miyazaki (少佐宮崎敏夫 Shōsa Miyazaki Toshio), who was an exchange student of English at Stanford University. Miyazaki, a.k.a. Mr. Tanni, recruited Thompson in San Pedro, California by offering to pay him $500 initially and an additional $200 monthly. He was persuaded to board U.S. Navy ships dressed in a yeoman's uniform, for the purpose of gathering information from the crews. Through this and other methods, he was able to sell engineering, gunnery, and tactical information about the Pacific Fleet that was mainly based in nearby San Diego at that time.

== Capture ==
Unfortunately for Thompson, the Director of the Office of Naval Intelligence (ONI), Capt. William D. Puleston, took a personal interest in so-called language students like Miyazaki. His suspicions were borne out when Japanese coded radio messages were intercepted and deciphered. In reviewing one intercepted message, the cryptanalyst Agnes Meyer Driscoll had marked a section containing the word To-mi-mu-ra (とみむら). Not knowing what it meant, Driscoll showed the message to a Japanese language expert. The expert initially explained that the word could reflect a Japanese name but Driscoll did not agree. The expert next pointed out that the element mura, meaning "town", also had the alternate pronunciation of "son". Thus when the element tomi was combined with "son" the word became Tomison, which is the Japanese way of pronouncing Thompson. The ONI had now a lead for a possible spy.

Their big break came about because of sloppy tradecraft by Thompson and Miyazaki. He told his story while drunk to Willard James Turrentine, an unemployed native of St. Louis who shared his Long Beach apartment because he wanted to expand his spy business. Turrentine in turn told all to the ONI with a letter from Thompson from Mr. Tanni which he stole as evidence. Not only was Thompson indiscreet by revealing all to Turrentine, but Miyazaki made the blunder of sending a letter through the U.S. Postal Service detailing espionage requirements and making references to Thompson's salary. The ONI in turn notified the FBI and Thompson was put under surveillance and was subsequently put under arrest in March 1936.

When the FBI arrested Thompson, Miyazaki suddenly left for Japan. Thompson was tried on July 2, 1936, and was convicted under the Espionage Act of 1917. During the trial, Turrentine was one of the foremost witnesses to testify against him. Thompson was sentenced to 15 years at prison on McNeil Island. If his spying activities had been done five years later when the United States was at war with Japan, he could have faced execution.

== In popular culture ==
Author Alan Hynd wrote about the Miyazaki-Harry Thomas Thompson case in his 1943 book, Betrayal From the East: The Inside Story of Japanese Spies in America. According to Hynd, "The story of Thompson's arrest broke in the newspapers on March 5, 1936. It was played up big in Washington."

Captain Ellis M. Zacharias also wrote a slightly different version of the Thompson spy case in his book Secret Missions: The Story of an Intelligence Officer. Zacharias was in Naval Intelligence and was personally involved in bringing the case to trial.

== See also ==
- John Semer Farnsworth
- Velvalee Dickinson
