= Tariki =

Tariki may refer to

- Tariki, New Zealand, a settlement in Taranaki, in the North Island of New Zealand
- Tariki (Buddhism), a concept in Buddhism
- Abdullah Tariki, a Saudi Arabian politician
