= Patrick Heenan =

Patrick Heenan may refer to:

- Patrick Stanley Vaughan Heenan (1910–1942), British Indian Army officer, spy for Japan during the Second World War.
- Pat Heenan (Patrick Dennis Heenan), American football cornerback

== See also ==
- Heenan (disambiguation)
