= John Farnsworth =

John Farnsworth may refer to:

- John F. Farnsworth, U.S. Representative from Illinois and general
- John G. Farnsworth, Adjutant General of New York
- John Semer Farnsworth, United States Navy officer convicted of spying for Japan
