= Norfolk Road railway station =

Railway stations at Durham and Norfolk Roads, Taranaki

Norfolk Road
- Norfolk Road railway station 22 May 1950, with Norfolk school also visible

General information
- Location: Mountain Road; Norfolk 4388; New Zealand
- Coordinates: 39°12′01.4″S 174°13′44.2″E
- Elevation: 250 metres (820 ft)
- System: New Zealand Government Railways (NZGR); Regional rail
- Line: Marton–New Plymouth line
- Platforms: Single side
- Tracks: 1

Construction
- Structure type: at-grade
- Architect: Vogel-era class 6

History
- Opened: 17 December 1879
- Closed: 22 February 1963 (all traffic)
Location
Notes
- Previous Station: Tariki Station; Next Station : Durham Road Station

Norfolk Road railway station was a small rural railway station on the Marton–New Plymouth Line in Taranaki, New Zealand. Opening to all traffic on 17 December 1879 as part of the line's extension from Inglewood towards Stratford, it served the local farming community in the area north of Tariki. The station was lightly equipped – typically just a shelter shed, a short passenger platform with a cart access, and a simple loading bank for goods. It saw limited use and was primarily a stopping place for local mixed trains and goods services rather than main express services. The station closed to all traffic in 1963.

== History ==
A railway station at Norfolk Road was first proposed while the railway was under construction south of Inglewood. Local settlers petitioned for a stop in 1879, and a siding at Norfolk Road was under consideration by late that year. The station officially opened in December 1879 along with the line.

For many years it remained little more than a flag stop. In 1896 it was described as having an accommodation shelter shed and a small passenger platform with a cart approach, along with a short crossing loop for freight wagons (initially fitting 16 wagons, later extended). By 1904–1906 the loop at Norfolk Road was lengthened to hold about 29 wagons, and a loading bank was added for freight (e.g. for farm produce or livestock).

The station's primary purpose was to serve the surrounding dairy farming district – there was a local primary school (Norfolk Road School) nearby and a dairy factory in the general area, so the station handled agricultural goods and provided farmers with passenger access to market towns. Notably, in 1907 an oil exploration venture took place at Norfolk Road: the Inglewood Oil Boring and Prospecting Company drilled an exploratory well (the “Norfolk Road bore”) near the station in search of petroleum. This created local excitement but did not lead to any lasting oil production.

Norfolk Road remained a quiet country stop through the mid-20th century. By the early 1960s, passenger use had dwindled, especially after railcar services replaced traditional trains (and often skipped minor halts). The station was closed to all traffic on New Year's Day 1963.

=== Rugby Road Crossing ===
Just south of Norfolk Road station, the railway intersected Rugby Road at a level crossing which by the 1920s–30s had a reputation as a danger spot for motorists. Numerous accidents occurred at the Rugby Road crossing – for example, in 1937 a collision between two cars there resulted in serious injuries, the driver having been distracted while checking for trains. Due to such safety concerns and growing highway traffic, a grade separation was eventually built.

In 1939 the Railways Department and Public Works constructed a road underpass (often referred to then as the Rugby Road “subway”) which carried the highway under the railway line near Norfolk Road station. This project eliminated the level crossing and, in fact, “eliminates the last level crossing on the state highways in Taranaki” – meaning it removed the final railway crossing on the main New Plymouth–Hāwera highway. The new Rugby Road overpass was completed just before World War II.

== Today ==
Little remains at Norfolk Road station today – the site is a small patch of grassland between the school and rural hall. The Marton–New Plymouth line itself is still in use for freight trains, but there is no sign that trains once stopped at this location.
