= The King's Theatre, Stratford =

Theatre in Stratford, New Zealand

The King's Theatre
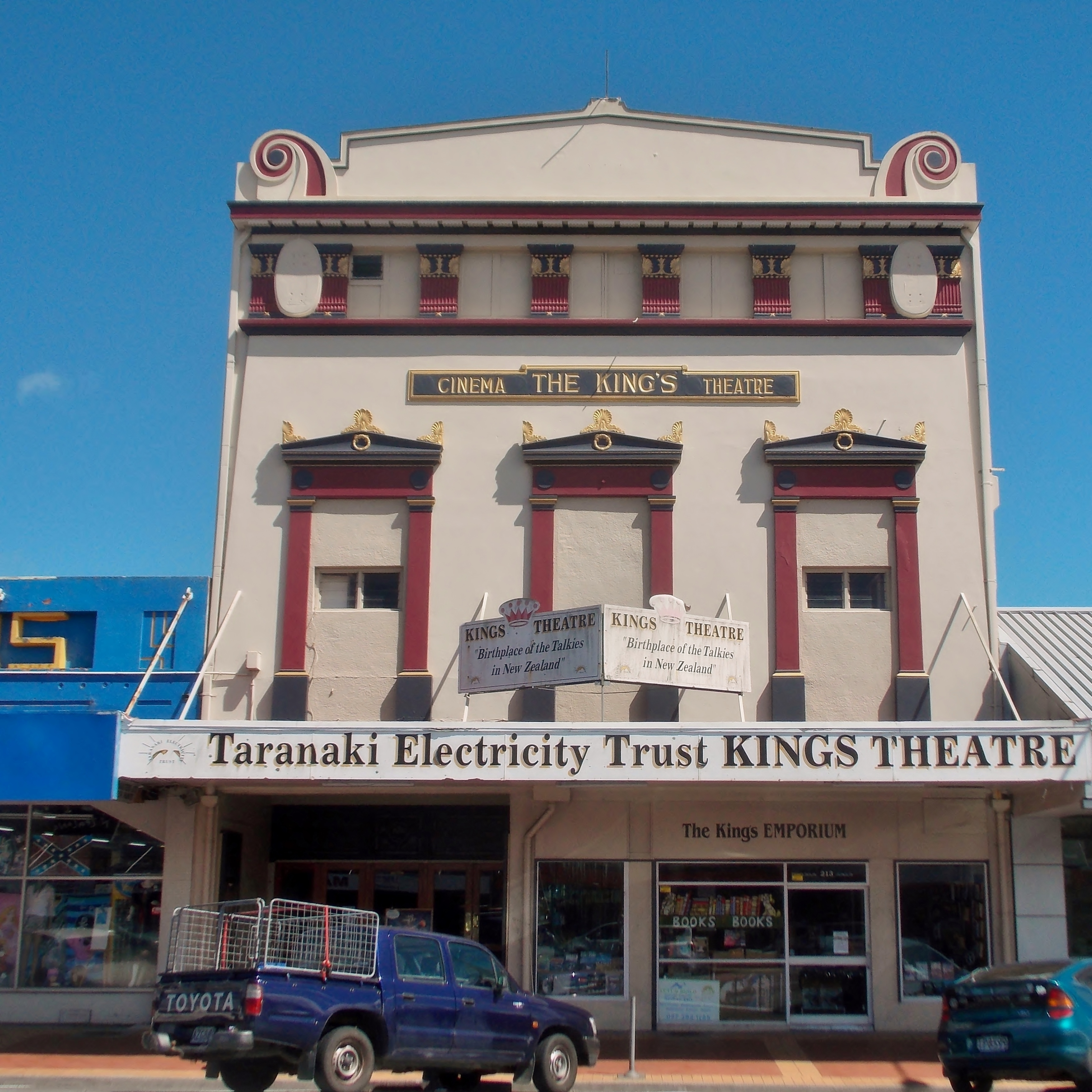
- The King's Theatre

General information
- Architectural style: Neo-Grec
- Location: 213-215, Broadway (State Highway 3), Stratford, Stratford, New Zealand
- Coordinates: 39.3385°S 174.2842°E
- Year built: 1917
- Opened: 31 December 1917
- Cost: £7134
- Owner: Stratford District Theatre Trust

Design and construction
- Architecture firm: Grierson and Aimer
- Main contractor: Johns and Sons

Website
- www.kingstheatre.co.nz

Heritage New Zealand – Category 1
- Designated: 12 December 2023
- Reference no.: 9865

The King's Theatre is a historic theatre in Stratford, New Zealand, constructed in 1917 it was the first theatre in the Southern Hemisphere to showcase sound film. It is registered as category 1 building by Heritage New Zealand.

== Description ==
The King's Theatre is the largest building on the main street of Stratford, the only taller building in Stratford is the Glockenspiel Clock Tower. The neo-Grec façade is painted burgundy, cream, and gold and is a prominent landmark. The exterior originally included Ionic capitals holding up a pedestrian canopy and the façade had Union Jack balustrading but both of these have been removed. The bottom half of the façade has ornamental pediments, topped with 3 acroteria each, and supported by entablature. These initially served as architraves for the windows and a balcony door, although these features have been filled in. The upper half of the façade has a cornice below the parapet. The cornice frieze has eight triglyphs each with a plaque featuring palmettes atop a fluted pilaster. Underneath the cornice are guttae. The highest point of the parapet had a decorative globe until 1919. The interior is ornate with classical influences such as the decorated plaster mouldings and Ionic columns, although most interior features are of classical design some art deco features installed in the 1950s and 60s remain. The interior is painted red, black, and gold with a warm beige background. A marble staircase leads to a mezzanine floor, which houses the ticket counter, snack bar, and toilets. A bust of William Shakespeare is displayed in the interior. Refreshments were served from a marble bar. The marble bar is now a book store which helps fund the theatre. A lean-to which was added in the 1960s is located at the rear.

== History ==
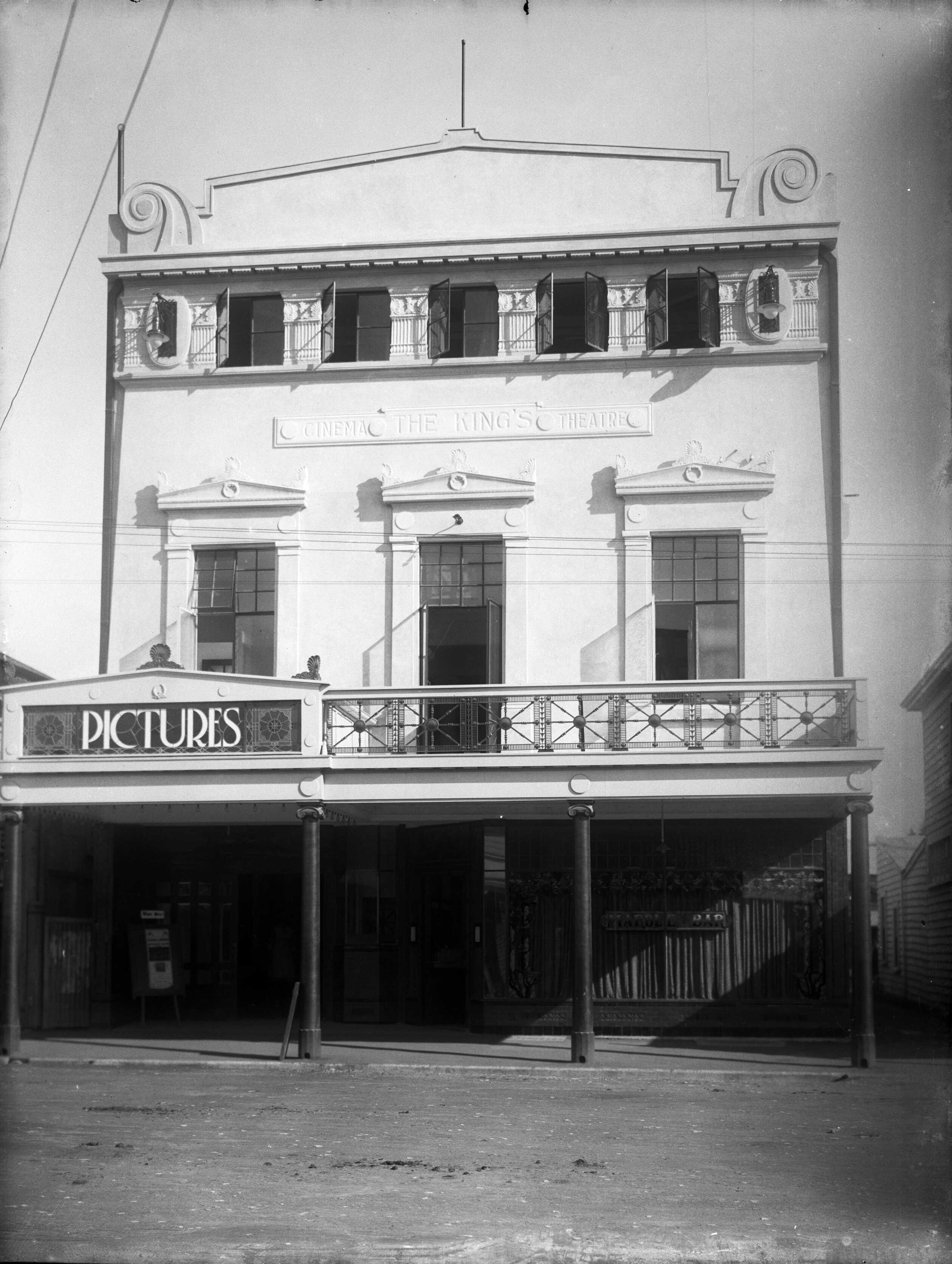
The King's Theatre c.1920

Stratford Pictures and Amusements Ltd was formed on 27 June 1916 by a group of businessmen. They hired Grierson and Aimer to design a three-storey theatre. Johns and Sons were awarded the tender for £7134 ($1.9 million in 2022). The name was not decided until April 1917. It was built in 1917 and opened on 31 December 1917 for a New Year's Eve screening of Madcap Madge. Live performers provided music and sound effects for the silent films and even used a pistol that fired blanks to recreate gunshots. It initially had seating for up to 700 people. One of the earliest examples of a picture palace in New Zealand, the theatre showcased Phonofilm technology on 30 December 1924—the first screening of a sound film in the Southern hemisphere—later screening took place through January and February the following year. By November 1929 it was regularly screening sound films and was a successful business. Following plaster falling onto a patron the Stratford Borough Council closed the venue from 1950–1951 whilst water damaged plaster was removed. Further alterations would occur in the 1960s, under new management the auditorium had seating reduced and many decorative features removed and the theatre renamed to The Regent. By the late 1960s the theatre had declined due to public broadcasting seriously reducing theatre patronage; The King's Theatre had become known colloquially as 'the bughouse'. In 1986 or 1988 (Note: The date is given as 1988 by Heritage New Zealand but as 1986 by the Taranaki Regional Council.) the theatre closed.

In 1991 a non-profit trust, the Stratford District Theatre Trust, was formed with the intent of purchasing the theatre and restoring it. The trust was formed following a successful Shakespeare Festival in town the year prior. Films were screened again in 1992 and continue to be shown. Many local organisations have provided sponsorships, grants, and materials to assist in the restoration work and operating costs. In the first year of full openings it had over 20,000 patrons. From 1992 to 1994 features such as the original façade and interior ornamentation were restored. From 2012 to 2014 earthquake strengthening work took place.

In 2024, the theatre was registered as a category 1 building by Heritage New Zealand. The theatre is also scheduled under the Stratford District Plan. The King's Theatre is now a dual-purpose theatre screening both films and plays. The theatre plays host to a national secondary school Shakespeare competition as well as the local Shakespeare Festival. Aside from the programmer all staff are unpaid volunteers.
