= John Heenan =

John Heenan may refer to:

- John Heenan (cardinal) (1905–1975), Roman Catholic Archbishop of Westminster
- John C. Heenan (1834–1873), American bare-knuckle fighter

See also

- Heenan (disambiguation)
