= Betrayal from the East =

1945 film by William A. Berke

- Film poster
- Directed by: William A. Berke
- Screenplay by: Kenneth Gamet; Aubrey Wisberg
- Adaptation by: Aubrey Wisberg
- Based on: Betrayal from the East by Alan Hynd
- Produced by: Herman Schlom
- Starring: Lee Tracy; Nancy Kelly; Richard Loo; Regis Toomey; Philip Ahn; Victor Sen Yung; Jason Robards Sr.; Drew Pearson
- Cinematography: Russell Metty
- Edited by: Duncan Mansfield
- Music by: Roy Webb
- Production company: RKO Radio Pictures
- Distributed by: RKO Radio Pictures
- Release date: April 24, 1945
- Running time: 82 minutes
- Country: United States
- Language: English

Betrayal from the East is a 1945 American spy drama film starring Lee Tracy and Nancy Kelly. The film was directed by William A. Berke and based on the 1943 book Betrayal from the East: The Inside Story of Japanese Spies in America by Alan Hynd. The supporting cast features Richard Loo, Regis Toomey, Philip Ahn, Victor Sen Yung, Jason Robards Sr. and Drew Pearson.

== Plot ==
An American is recruited by a Japanese spy ring operating in the United States, prior to the country's entry into World War II.

== Cast ==
- Lee Tracy as Eddie Carter
- Nancy Kelly as Peggy Harrison
- Richard Loo as Lieutenant Commander Toshio Miyazaki, alias Tani
- Regis Toomey as Agent Posing as "Sergeant Jimmy Scott"
- Abner Biberman as Yamato
- Philip Ahn as Kato
- Addison Richards as Captain Bates, G-2
- Bruce Edwards as Purdy, G-2 Agent
- Hugh Ho Chang as Mr. Araki (billed as Hugh Hoo)
- Victor Sen Yung as Omaya (billed as Sen Young)
- Roland Varno as Kurt Guenther
- Louis Jean Heydt as Jack Marsden
- Jason Robards Sr. as Charlie Hildebrand (billed as Jason Robards)
- Drew Pearson as himself

== See also ==
- Across the Pacific, a similar 1942 film starring Humphrey Bogart
