= Durham Road railway station =

Railway stations at Durham Road, Taranaki

Durham Road
- Durham Road railway station 22 May 1950, with dairy factory visible lower left.

General information
- Location: Mountain Road; Norfolk 4388; New Zealand
- Coordinates: 39°10′58.3″S 174°13′13.7″E
- Elevation: 227 metres (745 ft)
- System: New Zealand Government Railways (NZGR); Regional rail
- Line: Marton–New Plymouth line
- Platforms: Single side
- Tracks: 1

Construction
- Structure type: at-grade
- Architect: Vogel-era class 6

History
- Opened: 17 December 1879
- Closed: 19 May 1963 (passenger); 24 January 1966 (freight)
Location
Notes
- Previous Station: Norfolk Road Station; Next Station : Inglewood Station

Durham Road railway station was a small rural railway station on the Marton–New Plymouth Line in Taranaki, New Zealand. It opened on 17 December 1879 as part of the line's extension from Inglewood towards Stratford. Serving the local farming community south of Inglewood, the station was lightly equipped – typically just a shelter shed, a short passenger platform with a cart access, and a simple loading bank for goods. The station saw light use - primarily from local mixed trains and goods services for the local farm, including a nearby dairy factory. Regular passenger services ended in 1963 while Durham Road remained open for goods services until 24 January 1966.

== History ==
Durham Road station (like neighbouring Norfolk Road) opened as an unattended flag stop on 17 December 1879 when the railway line was first pushed south of Inglewood. It was named for the rural Durham Road that crossed the railway there. The station was simple and located close to the level crossing with the road it was named after. In the 1880s, local residents raised concerns about the safety of the level crossing and the need for better facilities. There are records of a “dangerous crossing at Durham Road” being complained about in 1888, and proposals to alter the station's site to improve that crossing in the 1880s.

By the mid-1890s the Railways Department listed the following amenities at Durham Road: a small shelter shed for passengers, a short platform on the left side of the line, a cart approach, and a loading bank for goods were installed around 1896–1898. A crossing loop was also laid, initially holding 16 wagons and later extended to about 20 wagons in the early 1900s.

The area around Durham Road station was a dairying district. In the late 19th century, the Maketawa Co-operative Dairy Factory was established not far from the station, which collected milk from local farms. As the closest station, this provided some traffic for the station.

A settlement never really grew up at the station itself, but it was an important point for farmers to send out their cream and receive goods. Throughout its existence, Durham Road station remained quiet. There were occasional incidents – for example, the crossing was known to be tricky and minor vehicle accidents occurred, though it did not gain the notoriety of Rugby Road. The station infrastructure saw little change after 1911, and by the 1950s, use had sharply declined.

Passenger trains ceased stopping by May 1963 and Durham Road station was officially closed to all traffic on 24 January 1966. This later final closure date (three years after Norfolk Road's) suggests that, for a short period, Durham Road might have still been used for the odd freight wagon or as a crossing loop if needed, but by the mid-1960s it too was deemed surplus to requirements and shut down.

== Today ==
There is little to indicate the location of Durham Road railway station today, with no platforms or buildings remaining. Durham Road station site is now the site of a roading metal dump, which the former dairy factory has also closed and now hosts a business specialising in loader parts. The Marton–New Plymouth line itself is still in use for freight trains, but there is no sign that trains once stopped at these locations.
