= George Heenan =

New Zealand cricketer

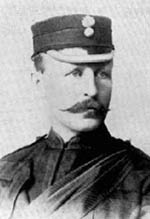

Personal information
- Full name: George Charles John Heenan
- Born: 13 September 1855; Bhaugulpore, Bengal Presidency, British India
- Died: 24 October 1912 (aged 57); Pauk, British Burma

Domestic team information
- Years: Team
- 1882/83–1887/88: Wellington
- 1891/92–1897/98: Taranaki

Career statistics
Competition	First-class
Matches	16
Runs scored	430
Batting average	17.20
100s/50s	1/0
Top score	146*
Catches/stumpings	3/–
- Source: CricketArchive, 28 January 2017

George Charles Heenan (13 September 1855 – 24 October 1912) was a New Zealand cricketer, schoolteacher and geologist. He was born in India, grew up in Ireland, lived for about 30 years in New Zealand, and died in Burma.

== Personal life ==
Heenan was born in India, grew up in County Westmeath in Ireland, and was educated in England at Cheltenham College and King's College London. He moved to New Zealand in 1880, and held positions as a schoolteacher in Wellington and in the Taranaki region, where he was headmaster at Waipuku and Ōpunake. He resigned from his position in Ōpunake in early 1903. While living in Wellington he was a first lieutenant of the Wellington Guards, of which he was a member for many years.

Heenan married Maude Dyer in Wellington in May 1884. He was living with her in Waipuku in 1894. In 1910 or 1911 he travelled to Burma with Annie Stanley and her son Patrick, who may also have been George's son. He died in Burma in 1912. A legal notice in 1914 described his profession as "geologist and art polisher". Annie and Patrick stayed in Burma until 1922 or 1923, when they moved to England.

== Cricket career ==
In 1882–83 Heenan scored 126 in Wellington senior club cricket, one of only 14 centuries in all New Zealand senior club cricket (there were none in first-class cricket) that season. He made his first-class debut for Wellington in 1882–83 and played regularly as a batsman over the next few seasons. In early 1886 a local paper described him thus: "Very uncertain bat, but once set, gives a lot of trouble; puts a lot of timber into his cutting and driving; fair field, but erratic; very nervous, to which alone is attributable his want of confidence."

Playing against Hawke's Bay in April 1887 he scored 146 not out, which was the first century for Wellington in first-class cricket. On the first day of the match, Hawke's Bay made 164, and Heenan went to the wicket with Wellington's score at 103 for 4. When he brought up his century the score was 250 for 7, and he was 110 not out at the end of the day's play. His innings was marked by powerful cuts. In the five first-class matches in the 1886–87 New Zealand season there were only five other fifties, and no other score above 81.

Heenan played a few matches for Taranaki in the 1890s, but with only moderate success. When Taranaki were dismissed for 35 and 29 in their match against Hawke's Bay in 1891-92, he was their top scorer, with 9 in the second innings. He also served as a selector for the Taranaki team.
