= Mount Egmont Branch =

Railway line in Taranaki, New Zealand

Overview
- Status: Closed
- Owner: New Zealand Railways Department
- Termini: Waipuku; Mount Egmont

Service
- Operator(s): New Zealand Railways Department
- Rolling stock: None

History
- Opened: 1908
- Closed: 1951

Technical
- Line length: 11 km (6.8 mi)
- Number of tracks: Single
- Character: Rural
- Track gauge: 1,067 mm (3 ft 6 in)

Map

The Mount Egmont Branch was a short but steep branch railway line in Taranaki, New Zealand, built to supply rail ballast for the Taranaki and Whanganui districts from a quarry on Mount Taranaki (known as Egmont during the line's lifetime). Although officially known as a branch, the line was more akin to an industrial siding, with only ballast being carried.

== Construction ==
A "Mount Egmont branch" line of about 9 miles (14 km) was authorised by the Railways Authorisation Act, 1904. The branch left the Marton–New Plymouth Line at Waipuku, 9 km north of Stratford.

Work started in 1906, and the first 9.6 km section was handed over to the New Zealand Railways Department by 1 April 1908. The line was extended to about 11 km from the main line by 1912–13, but an upper quarry extension to an elevation of 930m (which would have made it the highest line in New Zealand by over 100m) was not proceeded with.

As the readily available rock was worked out by 1937 and it was cheaper to supply ballast from riverbed plants, most of the branch closed in 1938 and the remainder, which had been unused for years, in 1951.

== Today ==
Between the junction and the edge of Egmont National Park, few signs of the branch remain. Within the park, the old roadbed has been converted into a walking track maintained by the Department of Conservation. Various relics of the railway and quarrying activity are visible from the track, most notably the substantial remnants of the ballast crusher.

== See also ==
- Marton-New Plymouth Line
- Ōpunake/Kapuni Branch
- Stratford–Okahukura Line
- Waitara Branch
