= William D. Puleston =

American Naval officer

William Dilworth Puleston
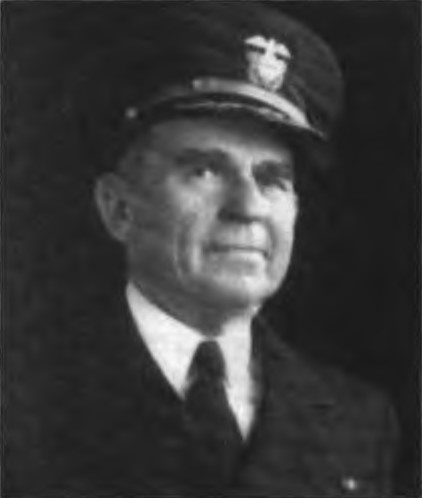
- Born: January 9, 1881
- Died: September 30, 1968 (aged 87)
- Burial place: Evergreen Cemetery, Portland, Maine
- Spouse: Marian Stanwood Emery (m. 1911)
- Military career
- Allegiance: United States
- Branch: United States Navy
- Rank: Captain
- Commands: USS Drayton (DD-23), USS Brooklyn (CA-3), U.S.S. Stringham, U.S.S. Sigourney, U.S.S. Cushing, U.S.S. Wyoming, U.S.S. Chaumont, U.S.S. Mississippi
- Conflicts: World War I
- Other work: Author

William Dilworth Puleston (September 1, 1881 – September 30, 1968) was an American naval officer and author. He was Director of Naval Intelligence from 1934 to 1937. He was considered "a popular, articulate and aggressive officer" and "an ideal planner, a student of world history and foreign affairs".

== Early life ==
William Puleston was one of four sons and two daughters of Samuel Richard Puleston, M.D., (born 22 March 1845 in Carmarthen, Wales-died Monticello, Florida, 1904) and his wife Lulu Dilworth Puleston. His father came from a family that originated in Willington Worthenbury, Wales, and emigrated to Florida to be with his uncle.

== Naval career ==
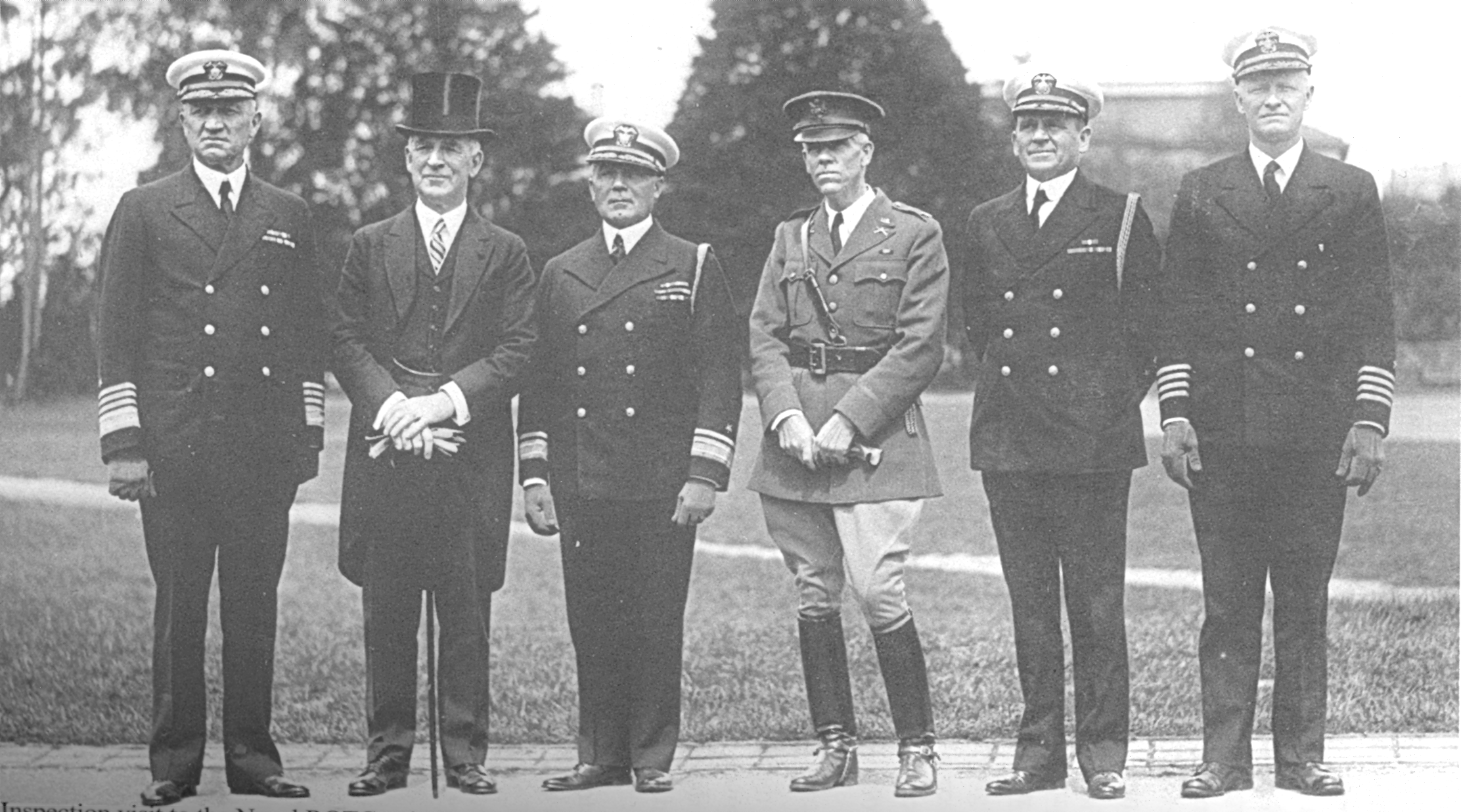
Puleston in 1927, second from the right (click to enlarge)

Puleston entered the U.S. Naval Academy in 1898 and graduated in 1902. Promoted to ensign in 1904, he was promoted through the ranks to captain in 1926. He served in various ships until 1912, when he took command of the destroyer USS Drayton (DD-23).

In 1914–15, as a lieutenant, he attended the Naval War College and stayed on for an additional year on the staff in 1915–16.During that time, he assisted the college's president, Rear Admiral Austin M. Knight, in preparing the first history of the college.

At the beginning of World War I, he was serving on the staff of the Commander in Chief of the Asiatic Fleet and was then transferred to duty as executive officer of USS Brooklyn (CA-3). In January 1918, he was ordered to Queenstown, Ireland for duty with U.S. Naval Forces in Europe. For this service in World War I, he received the Navy Cross for heroism in convoy duty. His citation read:

The Navy Cross is awarded to Commander William D. Puleston, U.S. Navy, for distinguished service in the line of his profession as commanding officer of the U.S.S. Stringham, the U.S.S. Sigourney and the U.S.S. Cushing, engaged in the important, exacting and hazardous duty of patrolling the waters infested with enemy submarines and mines, in escorting and protecting vitally important convoys of troops and supplies through these waters, and in offensive and defensive action, vigorously and unremittingly prosecuted against all forms of enemy naval activity.

After World War I, he served in the Hydrographic Bureau, he was assigned to USS Wyoming (BB-32), served as assistant chief of staff in the Scouting Fleet in 1924, then served ashore in the Bureau of Navigation, 1925–27, before returning to sea in command of Destroyer Squadron Eleven. as assistant chief of staff in the Battle Fleet in 1928–29, after which he attended the Army War College and served on its faculty in 1929–32. After commanding the transport USS Chaumont (AP-5), he went on to command the battleship USS Mississippi (BB-41).

On 4 June 1934, Puleston took up the post of Director of Naval Intelligence. Taking over at a time of shrinking budgets for intelligence activities, Puleston faced a difficult situation. During his three-year tenure, the United States faced threats from subversive radical groups within the United States as well as from foreign agents. Among the most prominent cases he dealt with were the cases of the spies Harry Thompson, the former U.S. Navy sailor who spied for Japan in 1934–35, and John Semer Farnsworth. At the same time he initiated greater attention to Japan and China.

Under Puleston's period as Director, Congress authorized the expansion of the staff in Washington and established new attaché offices in 1936 at Rio de Janeiro and Lima, Peru. The offices at Berlin, Germany, Brussels, Belgium, Buenos Aires, London, Paris, Peking, Paris, and Tokyo continued. In addition, he laid the plans for new offices to open in 1937 in Santiago, Chile and Bogotá, Colombia. In Puleston's final "ONI Estimate of the Situation for 1939," issued just before his retirement in April 1937, he called for more counter-intelligence to deal with the rapidly changing world political and military situation.

== Later career ==
Captain Puleston was recalled to active duty and served as special advisor to the Secretary of the Treasury, 1939–40. Following the attack on Pearl Harbor, he was recalled again in January 1942 and served during World War II as special advisor on economic warfare to the Secretary of the Navy. For this service, he was awarded the Legion of Merit in 1945. His citation described his service, as follows

For exceptionally meritorious conduct in the performance of outstanding services to the Government of the United States in determining the policies and coordinating the joint activities of the Navy Department and Foreign Economic Administration (formerly the Board of Economic Warfare) in waging economic warfare against the Axis Powers from 12 Jan 1942 to the present time.

Throughout this period, his thorough understanding of sea law and sea power, acquired during years of research in naval warfare (when he was adding the 'Life of Mahan' and other books to our naval literature) enabled him to indicate precisely how control of the sea could be used to maintain and increase the economic life of a nation; a zealous naval officer, he consistently pressed for the rigorous use of control of the sea by the United Nations to deny supplies and ammunition to the Axis Powers.

He not only contributed materially to a correct understanding of the law of blockade but his persistent presentation of the facts concerning the aid received by Axis Powers from the European neutrals was a large factor in suppressing this un-neutral traffic. His action reduced the economic resources available to the Axis, their ability to continue the war and definitely assisted in shortening the duration of the war.

== Personal ==
Puleston married Marian Stanwood Emery on August 12, 1911, in Falmouth, Maine. Bishop Robert Codman officiated at the ceremony.

Puleston and his wife retired to Maine.

== Publications ==
=== Books ===
- The Dardanelles Expedition: A Condensed Study (Naval Institute, 1925)
- High Command in the World War (C. Scribner's Sons, 1934)
- The Life and Work of Alfred Thayer Mahan (Yale University Press, 1939)
- The Armed Forces of the Pacific: A Comparison of the Military and Naval Power of the United States and Japan (Yale University Press, 1941)
- Annapolis: Gangway to the Quarterdeck [A History of the Naval Academy] (1942) — online HTML in full (Thayer's American Naval History site)
- The Influence of Sea Power in World War II (Yale University Press, 1947)
- The Influence of Force in Foreign Relations (D.Van Nostrand, 1955)

=== Contributions to Periodicals ===
- Scientific American, contributing editor
- Scribners
- Atlantic Monthly
- United States Naval Institute Proceedings

== Awards & Decorations ==
- Navy Cross
- Legion of Merit
- Spanish Campaign Medal
- Mexican Service Medal
- World War I Victory Medal
- American Defense Service Medal
- Swedish Order of the Sword
- Swedish Order of Vasa
- Venezuelan Order of the Liberator
- Belgian Order of Leopold II.

== Additional Sources ==
- Papers of Captain William D. Puleston at Naval History and Heritage Command, Washington D.C.
- Naval War College, Naval Historical Collection, Newport, R.I.:
  - Ms Coll 233: One folder of correspondence, 1947–48, with notes on freedom of the seas, 1929
  - Ms item 61: Translation of The Naval War in the Dardanelles by Captain A. Thomasi, French Navy
  - Ms item 77: Letter to Sir John Fortescue, 28 February 1933, regarding his comments on George Washington
- The Alfred Thayer Mahan Papers at the Library of Congress contain Puleston's research materials on Mahan and his family
- The John Callan O'Laughlin papers (1895–1949) at the Library of Congress Puleston-O'Laughlin correspondence
- The Fleet Admiral Ernest J. King Papers at the Library of Congress contain the Puleston-King Correspondence
- The Franklin D. Roosevelt Library, Hyde Park, NY Puleston-Cox Correspondence in The Papers of Oscar Cox
- Puleston's service dress uniform jacket with ribbons, biography
