= Donald Heenan =

New Zealand cricketer

Personal information
- Born: 25 November 1908; Gore, Southland, New Zealand
- Died: 14 June 1961 (aged 52); Invercargill, Southland, New Zealand
- Role: Wicket-keeper

Domestic team information
- Years: Team
- 1928/29–1929/30: Otago
- Source: ESPNcricinfo, 14 May 2016

Donald Heenan (25 November 1908 – 14 June 1961) was a New Zealand cricketer. He played two first-class matches for Otago, one each in the 1928–29 and 1929–30 seasons.

Heenan was born at Gore in Southland in 1908. He worked as a clerk. He made his first-class cricket debut for Otago against Canterbury in a February 1929 Plunket Shield fixture. He recorded a duck in his first innings and scored 14 not out in his second, batting last in Otago's order. He played again the following season, keeping wicket against Wellington in January 1930. In total he scored 19 runs and took three catches in his two representative matches.

Heenan died at Invercargill in 1961. He was aged 52.
