= Velvalee Dickinson =

US spy for Imperial Japan (1893–1980)

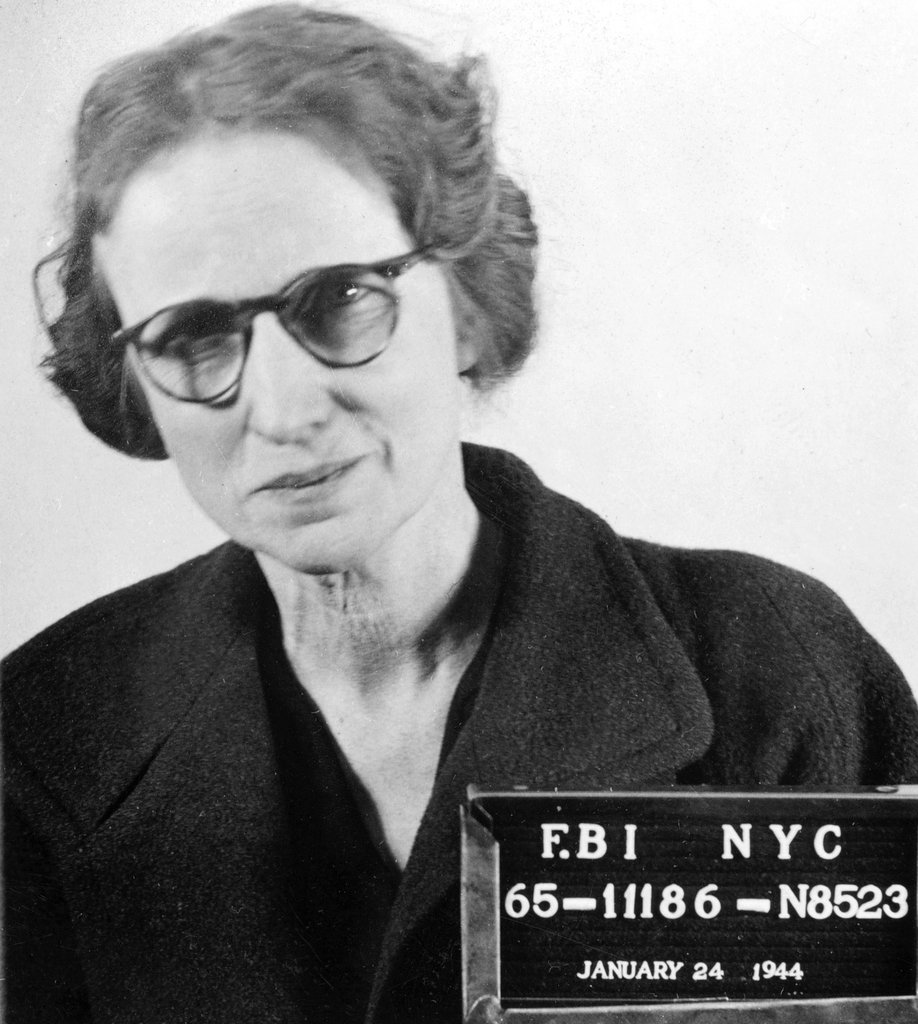
- Dickinson's 1944 FBI mug shot
- Born: Velvalee Malvena Blücher; October 12, 1893; Sacramento, California, US
- Died: 1980 (aged 86–87)
- Other names: Catherine Dickinson; Doll Lady; Doll Woman; Catherine Stefanis
- Education: BA, Stanford U. (1917/18)
- Occupations: Bank clerk; doll seller; spy; secretary
- Employers: Bloomingdale's; St. Vincent's Hospital; Eunice Kennedy
- Known for: Spying for Imperial Japan
- Criminal charges: Censorship violations
- Criminal penalty: 6.69 years imprisonment
- Criminal status: Conditional release
- Spouse: Lee Taylor Dickinson (died 1943)

Velvalee Dickinson (also the Doll Lady, Doll Woman, Catherine Dickinson, and Catherine Stefanis; October 12, 1893 – 1980) was an American seller of collectable dolls who became a spy for Imperial Japan during World War II. She was caught by the Federal Bureau of Investigation, but concerns over reasonable doubt led to conviction on lesser charges.

After serving less than seven years of a ten-year sentence in a West Virginia federal prison, she was conditionally released and, with the assistance of Eunice Kennedy, took work at St. Vincent's Hospital.

== Personal life ==
Velvalee Malvena Blücher was born on October 12, 1893 in Sacramento, California to Otto Blücher and Elizabeth Bottons (respectively born in West Virginia and Kentucky). In 1913 she graduated from Snell Seminary, a girls' school in Berkeley, California.

Dickinson earned her Bachelor of Arts from Stanford University in 1917 or 1918, but did not receive her diploma until January 1937 because of unreturned school library books. Twice divorced, her third husband was broker Lee Taylor Dickinson. By August 1944, she weighed 90 pounds (41 kg), with a height under 5 feet (1.5 m).

== Career and society ==
Dickinson worked for the California Fruit Growers Association and as a bank clerk; both employers "gave excellent reports of her."

She worked at her husband's San Francisco brokerage firm from 1928 to 1935. That business attracted many Japanese clients, which led Dickinson to join the San Francisco Japan–American Society; when "shady dealings" killed the Dickinson firm, and they were ejected from the Society, an attaché of the Japanese consulate stepped in to pay their dues and have them reinstated. Dickinson frequently visited that consulate; she socialized with Imperial Japanese Navy sailors and government officials there and at her home.

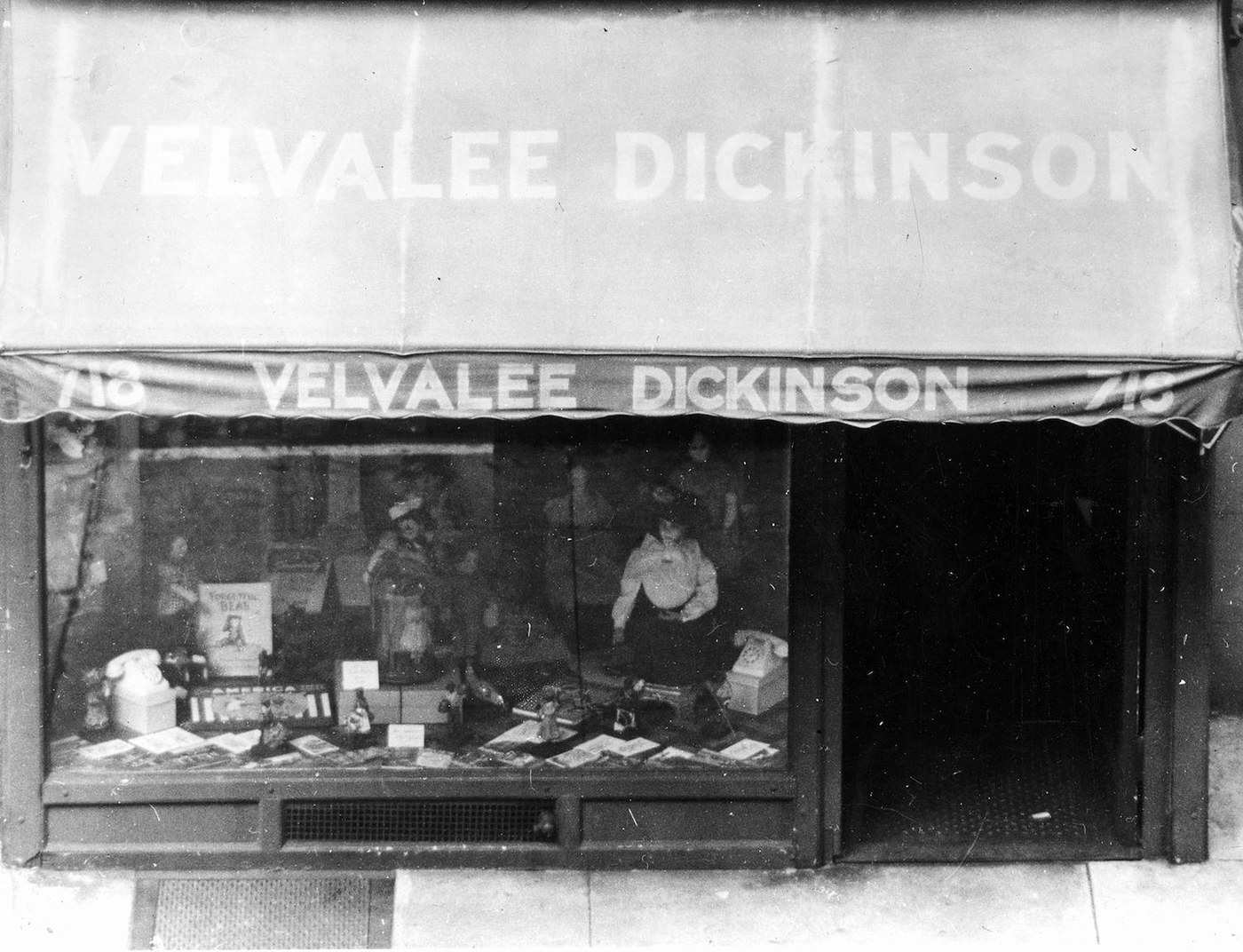
Dickinson's doll shop at 718 Madison Avenue in Manhattan

Dickinson's home & shops, all located one block east of Central Park in Upper Manhattan

After moving to New York City in autumn 1937, Dickinson sold dolls at Bloomingdale's for that Christmas and holiday season before going into business for herself in 1938. She worked first out of her home at 680 Madison Avenue and then had a storefront at 714 Madison Avenue; in October 1941, she moved her shop to 718 Madison Avenue. There, she sold to "wealthy doll collectors and hobbyists interested in obtaining foreign, regional, and antique dolls." Lee Dickinson handled her accounting until his death on March 29, 1943 from cardiovascular disease. The Velvalee Malvena Dickinson Doll Store stocked dolls from 18–19th century Paris, 19th century American pioneers, and native children's wooden idols from the Dutch Gold Coast. Dolls ranged in price from US$50–750 (equivalent to about $910–13720 in 2025). With movie stars among her customers, Dickinson advertised both her shop and services in House Beautiful and Town & Country.

== Espionage ==
Dickinson's spending outstripped the income from her shop. She especially bought phonograph records. Dickinson also traveled to California annually, joined the Manhattan Japan Society, often visited the Manhattan Nippon Club, and befriended the NYC Japanese Consul General and Ichiro Yokoyama. By 1941, she was taking out loans to cover her spending.

According to the St. Louis Sunday Morning, a "well-dressed Japanese" man briefly visited Dickinson's doll shop on November 26, 1941, and gave her "a small, compact bundle":

"I may not be able to come again," he said. The proprietor replied that they might meet again, perhaps in Honolulu, "No, No!" the Japanese exclaimed, "Not Honolulu."

In early 1942, she and her husband traveled to Portland, Oregon, San Francisco, and other cities on the West Coast of the United States. While there, one or both of them observed and made notes on United States Navy activity. Then, using the typewriters provided at their Pacific hotels, coded letters about American ships were written and mailed to an address in Buenos Aires, Argentina. The correspondence was written and signed as though it had come from Dickinson's contacts in the world of doll collecting (even including one woman's return address).

Five of these letters were returned undelivered. The returned letters were given to the United States Post Office Department, which turned them over to the Federal Bureau of Investigation (FBI).

=== Letters ===
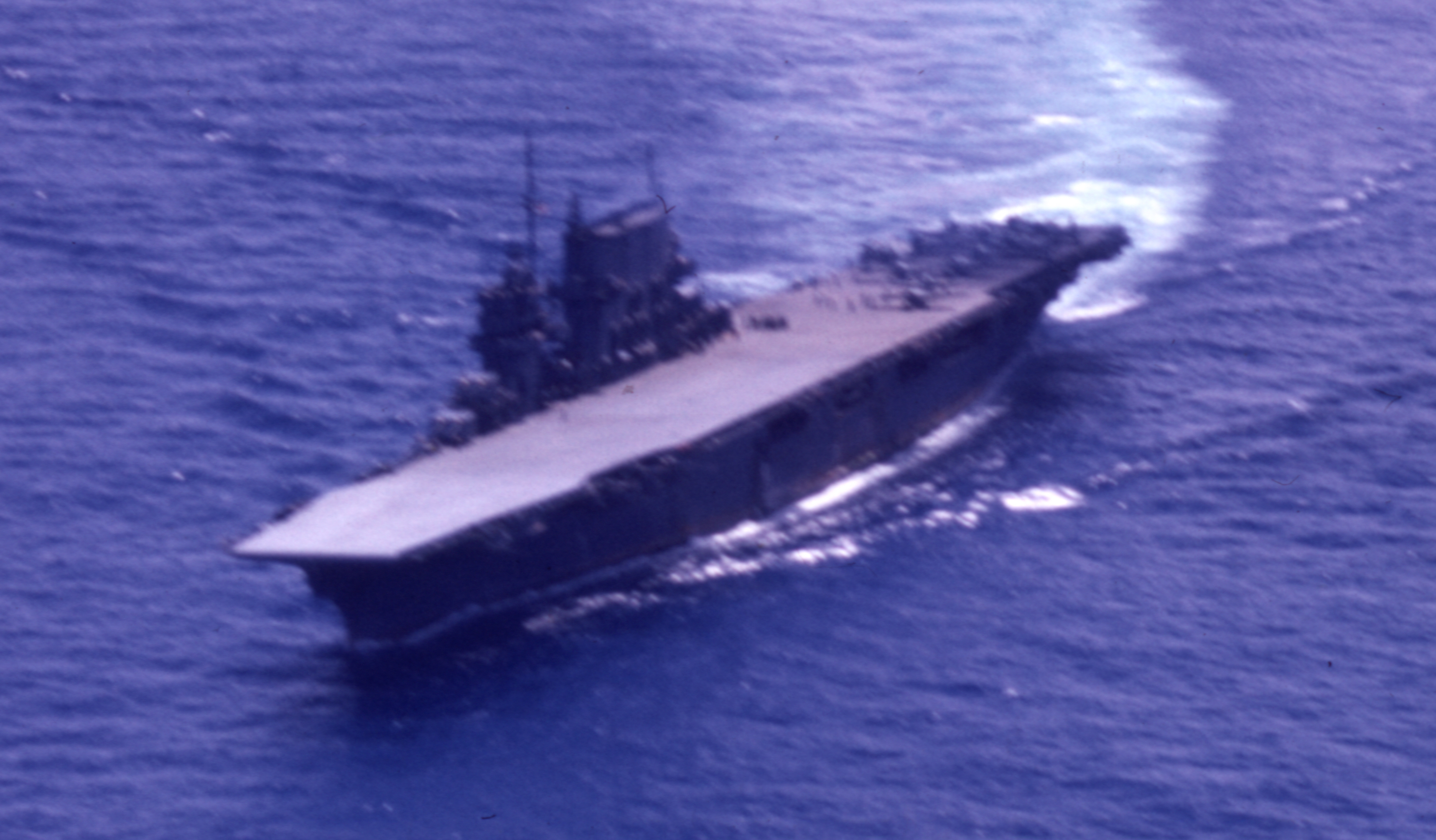
Saratoga in 1942

The first letter to attract the FBI's attention was brought to them in February 1942 from Portland, Oregon. This letter discussed a "wonderful doll hospital" and referred to "fish nets"; the FBI equated the former to a Navy shipyard and the latter to anti-submarine nets that protected ports.

In August 1942, another letter was returned to the woman in Portland; this one was dated May 1942 – written soon after USS Saratoga (CV-3) left the Puget Sound for San Diego:

I just secured a lovely Siamese Temple Dancer, it had been damaged, that is tore in the middle. But it is now repaired and I like it very much. I could not get a mate for this Siam dancer, so I am redressing just a small plain ordinary doll into a second Siam doll... — Source	I just secured information of a fine aircraft carrier warship, it had been damaged, that is torpedoed in the middle. But it is now repaired and I like it very much. They could not get a mate for this so a plain ordinary warship is being converted into a second aircraft carrier... — Translation

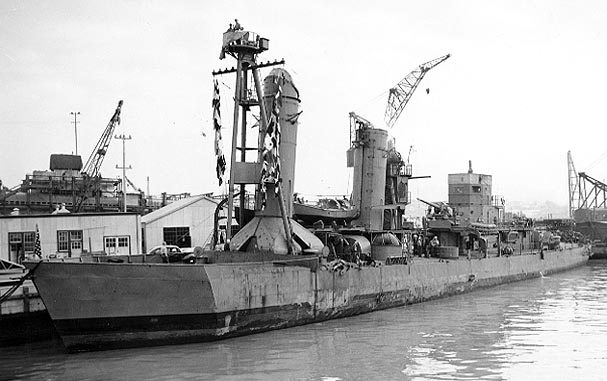
Shaw at Mare Island Naval Shipyard (c. February 1942)

Another letter, dated January 27, 1942, was mailed to "Señora Inez Lopez de Molinali" at 2563 O'Higgins in Buenos Aires. It bore a March 1 postmark of Grand Central Station and the return address of Mary Elizabeth Wallace, a doll collector in Springfield, Ohio, to whom it was returned in June. Some information in the letter was correctly specific to Wallace (an ill nephew and a lecture she had given), but the rest was not, including its typewritten nature and a forged signature. Wallace decided it was a tasteless joke, mocking her for her doll-collecting. She gave it to her postmaster, who forwarded it to the FBI. Among other coded language, this letter referred to a cancelled trip to Louisville, apparently an admission to collecting no information on USS Louisville (CA-28). It also provided an update on a "Mr. Shaw", who had been sick, but was recovering and would soon return to work; USS Shaw (DD-373) had been damaged in the attack on Pearl Harbor, arrived in San Francisco shortly before the letter was mailed, and was soon returning to service in the United States Pacific Fleet. When interviewed by the FBI, Wallace told them about visiting Dickinson's store, and confirmed sharing the personal information that had gone into the letter. When she gave them all of her correspondence with fellow doll collectors, the agency was able to match one of her other letters from Velvalee Dickinson.

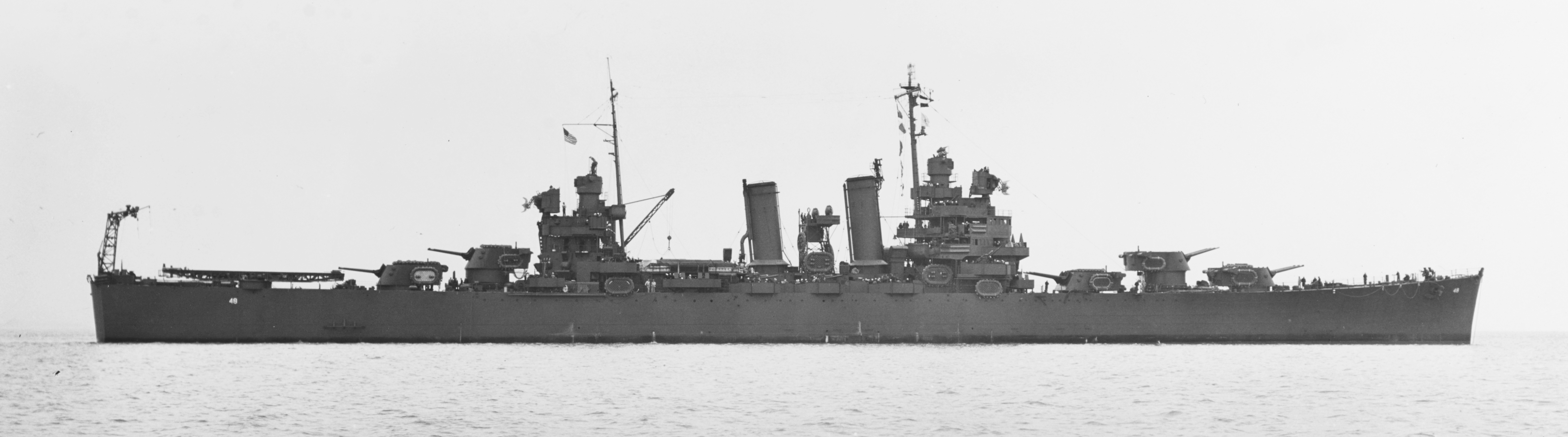
Honolulu in October 1942

A third letter, written to Señora de Molinali and postmarked from Seattle, was returned to a Spokane, Washington widow in summer 1942. This letter also contained some accurate personal information but referred to "an old German bisque doll dressed in a hula grass skirt", then in a doll hospital, which she expected would be "repaired by the first week in February." This referred to USS Honolulu (CL-48), which was at Puget Sound Naval Shipyard for repairs when the letter was written. Aside from her children, the Spokane widow could only think of one person who knew the personal information in the letter: Velvalee Dickinson, whom she had met in Seattle.

In August 1942, an Oakland, California-postmarked letter was given to the FBI, and analysis showed that its contents (about warships in San Francisco for repair) "would have been of tremendous value" to the Axis.

Another, written with the name and return address of a Colorado Springs doll collector who had corresponded and transacted with Dickinson, was intercepted by the FBI and found to be about a Navy cruiser ("a Siamese temple doll").

=== Investigation ===
Typewriting analysis determined that the same typist wrote all five letters (though used different typewriters). FBI agents found connections to Dickinson from all the women whose signatures had been forged on the returned letters, and two of them remembered "arguing with Ms. Dickinson about price or payment", leading to suspicions that she had used their names out of spite. The FBI was further able to match the letters to the typewriters used, and learned that by 1943, Dickinson was flush with United States one-hundred-dollar bills (after needing to borrow money only two years earlier).

Her suspicions raised by law-enforcement agents watching her shop, Dickinson left New York for Portland, Oregon, where she planned to meet with a former Imperial Japanese Navy officer – possibly then fleeing to Mexico for extraction by submarine. Followed by police and the FBI, when she arrived in Portland via Philadelphia, her contact's place of work – a Chinese restaurant – was closed. She anxiously returned to New York City several weeks later, still under surveillance by federal agents. On January 21, 1944, FBI agents ambushed Dickinson while she opened a safe deposit box in her Manhattan bank. Two-thirds of the US$15,940 (equivalent to $291,530 in 2025) found in her box was traced back to currency withdrawn by the Empire of Japan prior to the Pearl Harbor attack.

The bureau coordinated with Elizebeth Smith Friedman in their further analysis of the letters after Dickinson's arrest. She confirmed the use of an open code, as well as its use to relay information about American warships. She also noted that Señora Inez's street number was different on each of the envelopes, suggesting that they were not intended to actually be delivered, but instead to be recognized and intercepted en route by an Axis operative.

=== Prosecution ===
Dickinson initially claimed that the money was from insurance, savings, and her doll store, but later told the FBI that she found it in her husband's bed when he was dying. She said that her husband did not disclose the money's source, though she conceded it could have been the Japanese Consul in New York. Three weeks after her arrest, she was indicted by a federal grand jury in the United States District Court for the Southern District of New York for violation of censorship statutes. She pled not guilty and was held on bail of $25,000 (equivalent to $457,231 in 2025). A second federal indictment was handed down on May 5 on charges of violating espionage statutes, the Foreign Agents Registration Act, and censorship statutes. Dickinson again pled not guilty and her bail was continued. She was the first American woman to face possible capital punishment for espionage.

When the United States Attorney for the Southern District of New York, James B. M. McNally, was presiding over Dickinson's case, he had a 98% conviction rate. Dickinson, then being called "The War's Number 1 Woman Spy", was scheduled for trial on June 6, 1944, but it was postponed due to domestic fervor over the Normandy landings.

Because prosecutors were unsure of a conviction – Dickinson laid the bulk of the blame upon her dead husband – she was allowed to plead guilty to only the censorship-violation charges, providing she "furnish[ed] information in her possession concerning Japanese intelligence activities." With her guilty plea, Dickinson explained how she combined the questioning of unwitting civilians about the nearby warships in Bremerton Navy Yard and Mare Island Navy Yard with her own personal observations. She stated that Japanese Naval Attaché Ichiro Yokoyama had given Lee Dickinson the Japanese instructions and $25,000 (equivalent to $547,229 in 2025) inside her doll store in November 1941. The FBI did not believe her because evidence showed that she, not her husband, was already familiar with Yokoyama; because Lee Dickinson's doctor attested that he was mentally impaired at the time of the hand-off; and because Lee Dickinson's nurse and maid agreed that there had been no money hidden in his deathbed.

On August 14, 1944, Judge Shackelford Miller Jr. sentenced Dickinson to ten years imprisonment and a fine of $10,000 (equivalent to $182,892 in 2025). On April 23, 1951, after serving over six years, she was conditionally released from the Federal Correctional Institution for Women in West Virginia "to the supervision of the Federal Court system".

== Post-incarceration ==
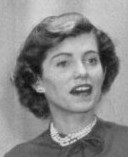
Kennedy (1952)

Dickinson became friends with Eunice Kennedy in 1950 while imprisoned in West Virginia. In 1951, after her release, Kennedy helped Dickinson (going by the given name "Catherine") secure a job at St. Vincent's Hospital. Years later, Kennedy employed her as an administrative assistant at Cape Cod; Ethel Kennedy called Dickinson "a remarkable secretary". In November 1961, the Social Security Administration registered Dickinson's name as Catherine Stefanis. In 1963, Kennedy tried to secure Dickinson a job at the 1964 New York World's Fair, though Eileen McNamara could not determine whether she was successful.

The FBI could only prove Dickinson had engaged in espionage after the attack on Pearl Harbor, but documents released in the 1960s show that the agency suspected she was already providing intelligence that she gathered from the wives of naval officers. In September 2001, the FBI refused to release its Dickinson files because it was unproven that she had died, and any release would be a privacy violation; she would have been 107 years old. In 2018, the Decatur, Illinois Herald & Review reported that Dickinson died in 1980.
