= Manganui River (Taranaki) =

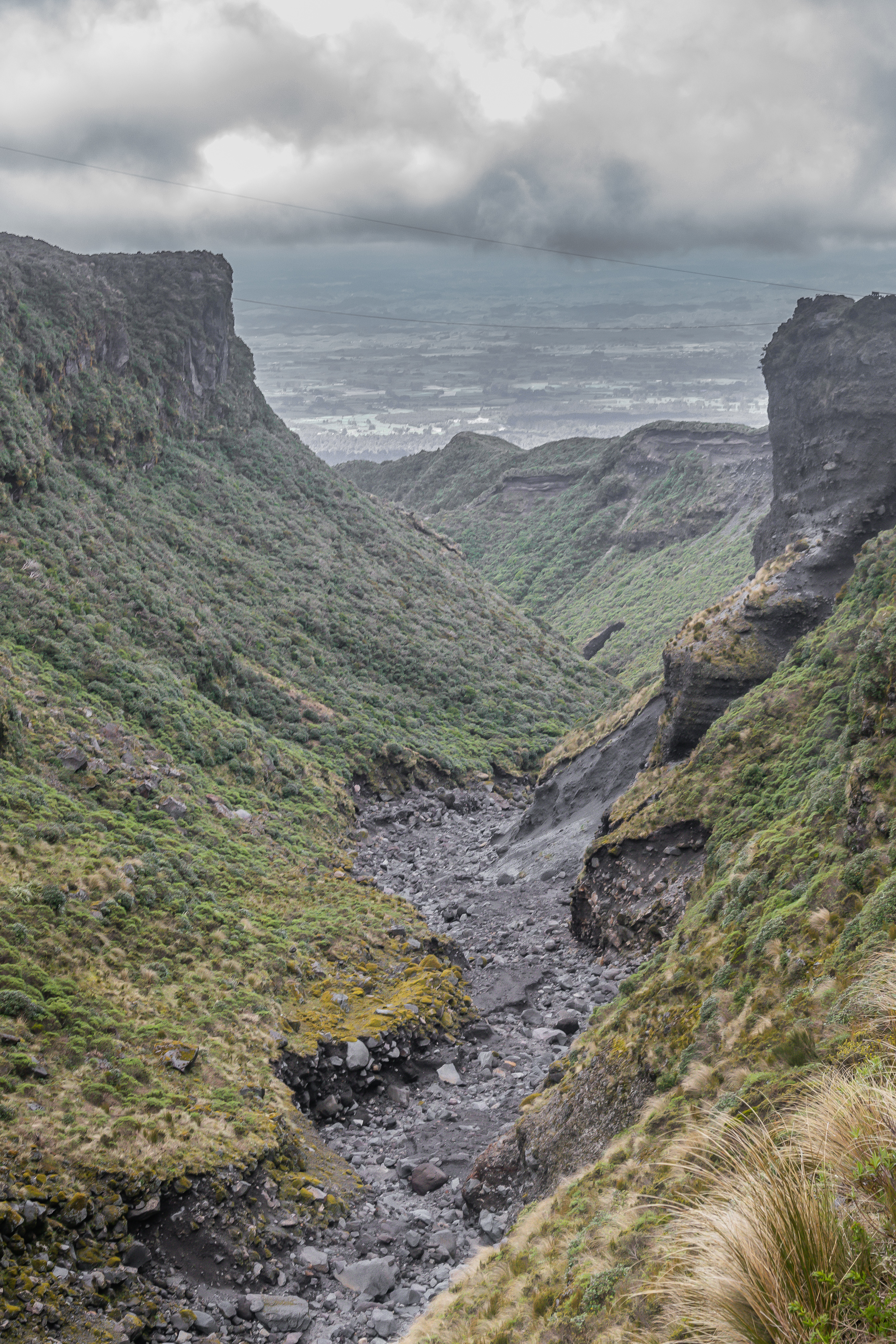
- View of the Manganui River on Mount Taranaki, near the Manganui Ski Area
- Route of the Manganui River
- Mouth of the Manganui River Manganui River (Taranaki) (North Island)

Location
- Country: New Zealand

Physical characteristics
- Source
  - location: Mount Taranaki
  - coordinates: 39°18′15″S 174°04′53″E
- Mouth
  - location: Waitara River
  - coordinates: 39°04′14″S 174°17′29″E
- Length: 39 kilometres (24 mi)

Basin features
- Progression: Manganui River → Waitara River → North Taranaki Bight → Tasman Sea
- Tributaries
  - left: Waipuku Stream, Mangamawhete Stream, Waitepuke Stream, Ngatoro Stream, Mangatiti Stream, Mangapotoa Stream
  - right: Te Popo Stream, Mangaotea Stream, Mākara Stream
- Waterfalls: Curtis Falls

Manganui River is a river that flows through the Taranaki Region of New Zealand's North Island. It initially flows east from its sources on the slopes of Taranaki/Mount Egmont, turning north close to Midhirst and joining with the waters of the Waitara River ten kilometres from the North Taranaki Bight coast.

== See also ==
- List of rivers of New Zealand
