= Waipuku =

Settlement in New Zealand

Coordinates: 39°16′S 174°16′E

Waipuku is a settlement in inland Taranaki, in the western North Island of New Zealand. It is located between Stratford and Inglewood (between Midhirst and Tariki) on State Highway 3.
