= John Semer Farnsworth =

US Navy officer convicted of spying for Japan in the 1930s

- John Semer Farnsworth in the US Naval Academy yearbook
- Born: August 13, 1893; Chicago, Illinois, U.S.
- Died: November 10, 1952 (aged 59); Manhattan, New York City, New York, U.S.
- Military career
- Allegiance: United States; Japan as a spy
- Branch: United States Navy
- Service years: 1911–1927
- Rank: Lieutenant Commander
- Nickname: Dodo

John Semer Farnsworth (August 13, 1893 – November 10, 1952) was a United States Navy officer who was convicted of spying for Japan during the 1930s. He was identified as Agent K in radio messages intercepted by the Office of Naval Intelligence (ONI).

== Naval career and court-martial ==
Farnsworth, who was born in Chicago, Illinois to Frederick Wilkinson Farnsworth and Anna M. Semer, was appointed to the U.S. Naval Academy in Annapolis, Maryland in 1911 on the recommendation of then-Representative Nicholas Longworth. He became notorious for his drinking escapades, earning him the nickname "Dodo" (among others). The Naval Academy yearbook described him as "daring and reckless", further stating that if Farnsworth lived in the days of the old navy, he "would have been famous for his desperate deeds and hairbreadth escapes". Nevertheless, he was also recognized for his sterling abilities as a future naval officer.

Upon graduation four years later, he was assigned to the US Asiatic Fleet, mainly onboard destroyers. He returned to the United States in 1917 with the temporary rank of lieutenant.

In 1920, he took flight training at Naval Air Station Pensacola. He received ratings on seaplanes and airships when he completed training in 1922. He then returned to Annapolis, the Massachusetts Institute of Technology and finally a college in New York for his post-graduate studies. He eventually attained the rank of lieutenant commander.

After marrying a society woman, Farnsworth went heavily into debt, and borrowed money from an enlisted man, which he refused to repay. Because of this, Farnsworth, once considered to be one of the brightest young officers of the Navy, was brought to a court-martial in 1927. On November 12, 1927, for conduct "tending to impair the morale of the service" and "scandalous conduct tending to the destruction of good morale", he was found guilty and was given a dishonorable discharge from the service.

== A career in spying ==
Disgruntled and in need of money, he began spying for Japan, which had been attempting to recruit many Americans for espionage in the 1920s and 1930s. He passed his information to his handlers, Commander Yoshiyuki Ichimiya, assistant Naval attaché at the Japanese Embassy from October 1932 to December 1934, and Lt. Commander Arika Yamaki, who succeeded Ichimiya until November 1935. Farnsworth later claimed that he was paid $100 a week plus expenses for his spying.

Despite his disgraceful exit from Naval service, Farnsworth still had enough social grace to make him acceptable in the best Washington society. He got most of his information by contacting former associates to solicit documents, who were unaware of the true reason for his requests, saying that he needed the information for "magazine articles". He also picked up small bits of Navy information from wives of high-ranking officers and shrewdly pieced them together. Once, feigning drunkenness and pretending that he was a commander, he boarded a destroyer at Annapolis, tricked an ensign into giving him maneuver data, rushed back to the Japanese Embassy, had them photostatted, and returned them the next day. It was actually easy for him to obtain this information, as Navy security at that time was relatively lax.

However, when Farnsworth stole a confidential Navy manual, The Service of Information and Security, which contained plans for battle information and tactics that were gathered from field maneuvers and tested by high-ranking naval officers, alarm bells were raised, and the Office of Naval Intelligence (ONI) was called upon to investigate its disappearance. It was learned later that he had photostatted the manual and sold the copy to the Japanese on May 15, 1935.

During the investigation, ONI officers heard that Farnsworth had been flashing large sums of money around naval officers who knew him, despite the fact that he was believed to be destitute. Further investigation revealed that he had borrowed code and signal books and had been asking questions about tactics, new ship designs, and weapons. Finally, the wife of a high-ranking officer living in Annapolis complained to the ONI that Farnsworth was pushing her to allow him to read official documents. He was placed under joint surveillance by the ONI and the FBI.

== Meetings with a journalist ==
When Commander Yamaki was replaced by Commander Bunjiro Yamaguchi in November 1935, the latter decided to pay Farnsworth on a piecemeal, rather than retainer, basis. Faced with a sudden drop in income, and somehow having got wind that investigators were closing in on him, he approached Fulton Lewis Jr., the Washington correspondent for the Hearst newspapers, in early 1936. He proposed to Lewis that he would write a series of articles entitled: "How I was a Spy in the American Navy for the Japanese Government" for $20,000 in an apparent effort to convince him that he was a double agent. He also made it a condition that he be given a head start to catch the zeppelin Hindenburg for Germany. Lewis promptly informed Capt. William D. Puleston, the Director of ONI, of the encounter.

The next time Farnsworth and Lewis met, the latter demanded proof of the former's relations with the Japanese. Farnsworth then called up Commander Yamaguchi in Lewis's presence and demanded money from the officer. A meeting was arranged, and Farnsworth tried to convince Lewis to accompany him, posing as a cabdriver. Lewis refused, but so anxious was Farnsworth to prove his bona fides that he took Lewis to the office where he had the confidential manual photostatted and also provided other corroborating evidence to his story.

== Arrest, trial and conviction ==
Faced with this evidence, Lewis told Puleston again, who arranged for Farnsworth's arrest on July 14, 1936. Farnsworth was charged with selling confidential information to the Japanese. He was held on $10,000 bond until his preliminary hearing.

The case was given to a grand jury. During the grand jury testimony, it was revealed that Farnsworth had telephoned the Japanese Embassy twice on the day before his arrest. Lt. Commander Leslie G. Genhres testified that Farnsworth took the confidential study from his desk in the Navy Department on August 1, 1934. An employee of the navy photostat plant, Mrs. Grace Jamieson, said that Farnsworth made frequent visits to the plant to copy military documents.

Based on this, the grand jury indicted Farnsworth on the charge of selling to the Japanese the confidential manual, as well as conspiracy to do the same; in the indictment, the grand jury also included Lt. Commanders Ichimiya and Yamaki, who promptly left for Japan. If found guilty, Farnsworth would face a maximum sentence of 20 years.

Although Farnsworth indicated that he would base his defence on an aircraft accident he had when he took courses in NAS Pensacola, making him "irresponsible", the Navy shot down that argument, saying that no record of such an accident existed. His lawyer, in turn, asked the court-martial commission to have Ichimiya and Yamaki testify in Farnsworth's defence through the American Consul General in Tokyo. However, Japan refused the request, citing Japanese law prohibiting military officers from being compelled to answer questions in a foreign country.

On February 15, 1937, Farnsworth changed his not-guilty plea to nolo contendere, dispensing with a jury trial and leaving the judge to decide on the case; if the trial had proceeded, the prosecution would have been ready to prove its case by presenting a parade of witnesses and other evidence. When the judge heard the no-contest plea, he indicated that he would review the aspects of the case before he pronounced sentence. However, a few days later, Farnsworth again changed his plea to not guilty. He reasoned that he made his plea without prior counsel, and it was based on the notoriety that resulted from his case. The judge said that Farnsworth was within his rights to change his plea before sentencing and that he would hear his motion.

This was, in fact, the first of Farnsworth's attempts to have his case dismissed. His defence team withdrew, and he informed the judge that he would conduct his defence pro se. His next move was to file a writ of habeas corpus to obtain his release. He argued that the facts alleged in the indictment, under which he was convicted, did not constitute a crime. He further argued that he did not know that nolo contendere was tantamount to a guilty plea and wanted to withdraw the plea, but was met with rejection. The court was not in any way convinced of these arguments and denied his writ.

== Sentencing and appeal ==
On February 27, 1937, John Semer Farnsworth was sentenced to four to twelve years in prison for conspiring "to communicate and transmit to a foreign government—to wit Japan—writings, code books, photographs and plans relating to the national defense with the intent that they should be used to the injury of the United States". Details of the Farnsworth case appeared in Alan Hynd's 1943 book Betrayal from the East: The Inside Story of the Japanese Spies in America and in Captain Ellis M. Zacharias' 1946 book Secret Missions: The Story of an Intelligence Officer.

In January 1938, he appealed the judge's decision in his petition for the writ of habeas corpus by arguing that the court erred in ruling that a petitioner could not be released "from unlawful imprisonment" by habeas corpus proceedings; further, that the court did not have jurisdiction in the first place and had no power to pronounce an indeterminate sentence. Despite his efforts, his appeal was rejected and his sentence upheld by the United States Court of Appeals for the Fifth Circuit.

He served an eleven-year prison term. He died in Manhattan at age 59.
