= Tariki, New Zealand =

Tariki
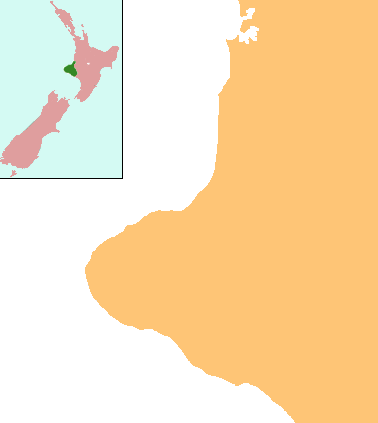
- Location within Taranaki Region
- Coordinates: 39°14′10″S 174°14′40″E
- Country: New Zealand
- Region: Taranaki
- District: New Plymouth District
- Postcode(s): 4390

Tariki is a small farming community immediately to the east of Mount Taranaki in the west of New Zealand's North Island. It lies on SH 3 halfway between the towns of Inglewood and Stratford. Several small streams, all tributaries of the Manganui River, pass close to Tariki.

The origin of the settlement's name is unknown – it may be named for a person, or be a corruption of the Māori term tarika, meaning to toss and turn.
