= Normanby railway station, Taranaki =

Railway station in Normanby, Taranaki, New Zealand

Normanby
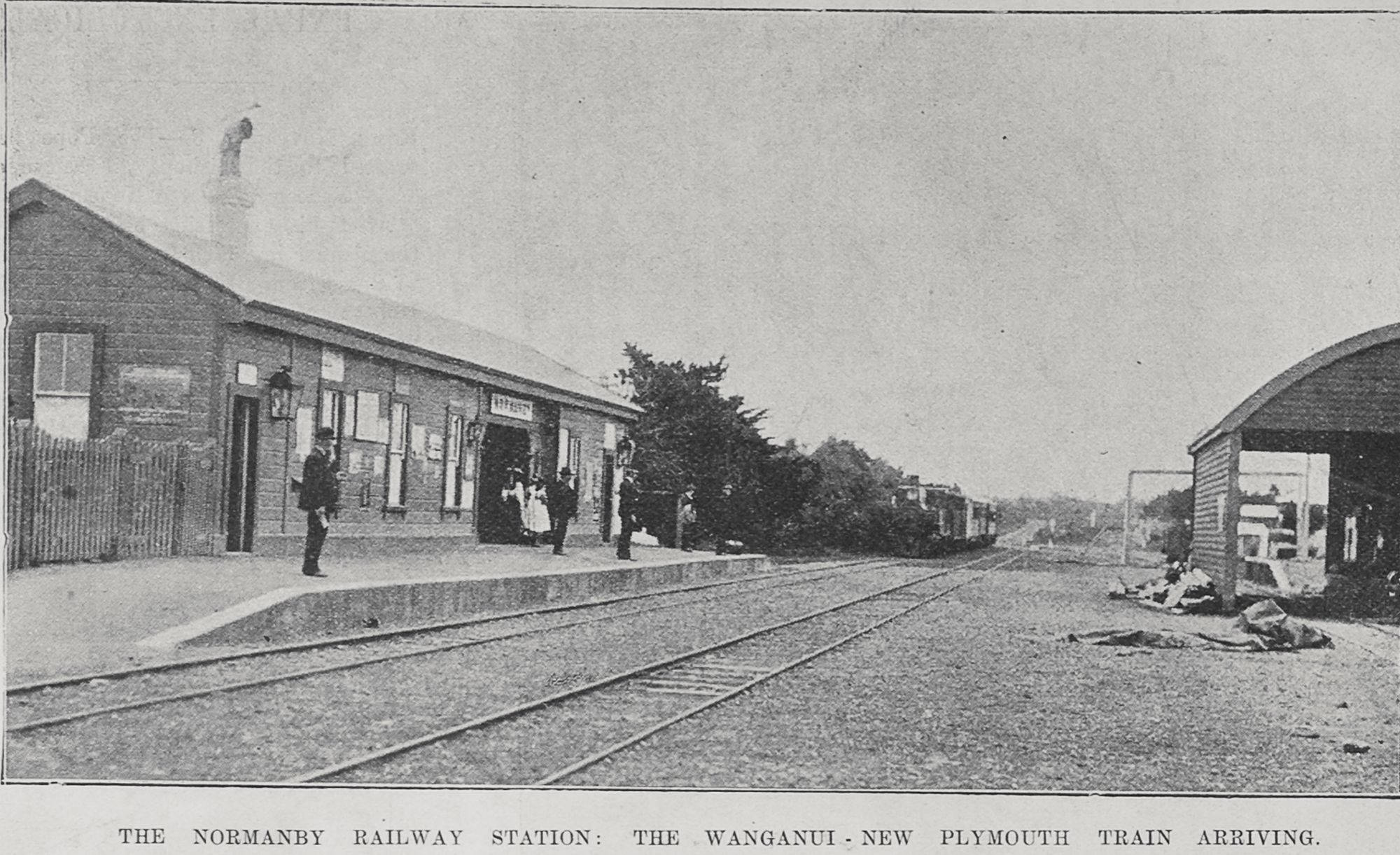
- The Normanby railway station with the Wanganui-New Plymouth train arriving. 28 December 1900.

General information
- Location: Waihi Road; Normanby 4614; New Zealand
- Coordinates: 39°32′06.7″S 174°16′25.6″E
- Elevation: 117 metres (384 ft)
- System: New Zealand Government Railways (NZGR); Regional rail
- Line: Marton–New Plymouth line
- Distance: 138.52 kilometres (86.07 mi) from Marton
- Platforms: Single side
- Tracks: 1

Construction
- Structure type: at-grade
- Parking: yes
- Architectural style: Vogel class 3

History
- Opened: 18 June 1881; 145 years ago
- Closed: Passenger: 31 May 1976; 50 years ago Freight: 22 September 1986; 40 years ago
Location
Notes
- Previous Station: Hāwera Station; Next Station: Te Roti Station

Normanby railway station was a rural station on the Marton–New Plymouth line, located in the town of Normanby in Taranaki, New Zealand. Opened in 1881, it served the local community for over a century before closing in 1986. It was one of two railway stations in the area and should not be confused with the similarly named Normanby railway station near Timaru in the South Island.

== History ==
In 1878, government surveyors were determining the exact route of the railway south to Hāwera, including the location of a station to serve the emerging township of Normanby. The initial site selected was at the southern edge of the planned town, in an area known as the Normanby Extension, where four acres of land had been gifted to the government for a station. However, an alternative site at the northern end of the township (near Ketemarae Road) was also offered up for free. This northern block was sometimes referred to as "Hone Pihama's," after the local rangatira whose plantations lay north-east of the town.

Following a period of ongoing and occasionally heated public debate, the government ultimately selected the northern site at Ketemarae Road for the main station. To placate residents and landowners in the southern portion of the township—many of whom had invested in the area anticipating a station—a small halt was also established at Normanby Extension. As a result, Normanby briefly had two railway stations serving the town.

Construction progressed rapidly. By 1 June 1881, local newspapers reported that the goods shed was framed and partially enclosed, the station building had been roofed, and the track had been laid and was awaiting final ballasting. The work was soon completed, and the station officially opened on 18 June 1881.

=== Facilities ===
Normanby station was equipped with typical facilities for a rural station of its size. Passenger amenities included a standard Vogel Era Class 3 station building with open lobby, luggage room and postal facilities, platform, and cart approach. For freight, the site featured a 40-by-30-foot goods shed, a loading bank, and stockyards for sheep and cattle. Two 30-wagon loops were constructed off the main line, along with a 33-wagon backshunt to accommodate additional rolling stock. A stationmaster's house was also built nearby.

The station's facilities were progressively upgraded throughout its operational life. In July 1899, a luggage room was added to the station building, followed two months later by the installation of a Verandah to provide shelter for waiting passengers. By 1906, fixed signals had been introduced, and by 1911 a freight crane was in place to assist with loading and unloading operations.

From the 1950s onward, Normanby began to decline in importance. On 21 June 1969, the station lost its stationmaster and was reclassified as an unattended flag station. In November 1978, the former post office end of the station building was removed, and by August 1982, the entire building had been dismantled. By 1986, the site was described as simply "a loop siding for local loading and a low-level passenger platform."

==== Post Office ====
For more than sixty years, Normanby railway station also served as the town's post & telegraph office. Postal services were transferred to the station on 8 July 1881 from the general store. This dual use was typical of smaller rural stations, where the stationmaster often acted as the postmaster and mailbags could be easily transferred to and from passing trains. Services included mail handling, telegraph and later telephone access.

As early as 1887, concerns were raised that the station facilities were inadequate for telephone operations, but it took until September 1899 for a soundproof telephone booth to be added to improve service quality.

In addition to standard postal duties, the office also functioned as a branch of the Post Office Savings Bank, which increased the risk of burglary. In 1920, an unsuccessful attempt was made to blow open the station safe. In 1931 the safes in the building were attacked twice – once in June, when it was cracked open, and again in October, when explosives were used. Press reports noted the theft of cash during both incidents.

In 1923, the post office was separated from the railway offices by sealing the through door, but remained in the shared building. In 1942 a separate postmaster was appointed, but by the 1960s the location was becoming inconvenient and on 7 July 1969, the post office moved to a new building in town.

== Services ==
=== Passenger services ===
Upon the station's opening, it was served by mixed services. A timetable from 1884 shows two services in each direction each day serving the station. Once the through line to Wellington was completed, the New Plymouth Express service also passed through the station - in 1897 the north and southbound mail trains were reported as crossing at Te Roti station. By 1904 services had increased to 3 southbound and 4 northbound services each day (excluding the Express that would not stop).

With the opening of the Ōpunake Branch in 1926, trains ran between Hāwera and Ōpunake, stopping at Normanby on request. From 7 May that year, the New Plymouth Express ceased stopping at Normanby except for passengers travelling south of Aramoho. This change coincided with the introduction of the Taranaki Flyer, a local passenger-only service that stopped at many smaller stations bypassed by the Express, including Normanby.

By the 1950s, the lifting of wartime petrol and travel restrictions contributed to a decline in passenger numbers. On 30 October 1955, both the Flyer and the Express were withdrawn and replaced with a faster railcar service as part of efforts to modernise passenger operations. However, passenger traffic continued to fall, and the station was closed to passenger services on 31 May 1976.

=== Freight services ===
In addition to passenger operations, Normanby station handled a modest amount of freight traffic, typical of small rural stations in the Taranaki region. The surrounding district was primarily agricultural, and freight consignments largely consisted of livestock, fertiliser, and agricultural produce. A goods shed and loading bank were provided early on to support these activities.

By 1939, livestock traffic had grown significantly, prompting the extension of the station sidings. The upgrade increased capacity from five cattle or sheep wagons to over fifteen at a time, allowing for more efficient handling of stock traffic.

As with many rural stations, freight volumes at Normanby declined in the post-war decades due to the rise of road transport.On 1 February 1981, the station was closed to all except wagon-lot freight, and it closed completely on 22 September 1986, the same day as several other Taranaki stations, including Lepperton, Inglewood, Midhirst, Kapuni, Patea, and Waverley.

== Accidents and incidents ==
Normanby station was the site of several accidents, near-misses and other incidents over the years, many associated with the busy level crossing near the station yard.

In December 1906, a local farmer was fatally injured while loading cattle at the station stockyards. According to reports, he was trampled by frightened livestock after a slip during the loading process.

In January 1913, a horse and cart was struck by a train while crossing the line at the main road level crossing. The cart was destroyed and the driver narrowly escaped serious injury.

A particularly serious incident occurred in March 1933, when a youth was fatally injured during shunting operations. The boy attempted to jump onto a moving wagon and slipped beneath the wheels, sustaining fatal injuries.

Public concern about the safety of the level crossing intensified through the 1930s. In 1935, plans were announced to eliminate several crossings across the country, including Normanby and neighbouring Ngaere by constructing overbridges to carry road traffic over the railway line. In 1936, plans were complete and steel ordered, and the new overbridge was completed and opened in August 1937, significantly improving safety for both road users and railway operations.

Another serious road accident occurred on 3 June 1940, when Mr William Minhinnick's horse-drawn gig was struck by a New Plymouth-bound morning RM class Standard railcar at the level crossing adjacent to Normanby station. The horse was killed in the collision, and although Mr Minhinnick survived, he was reported to be suffering from shock.

In 1965, one of the more unusual incidents at Normanby occurred during a police investigation into a burglary at the station post office. While at the scene, officers witnessed a motorised railway jigger pass the station with no one aboard. It was later determined that the jigger had been stolen from Kakaramea, south of Hāwera, and was eventually recovered near Eltham. How far it travelled while unattended remained unknown.

== Normanby Extension ==
Normanby Extension railway station was a small halt located just over 1 km south of the main Normanby station. It was built on land originally donated for a station site in 1878. The station saw little use; within three years, its closure was proposed. In May 1893, it was reported that "the old extension station has been shifted bodily to Hāwera, thus ends the fight of years gone by of the Normanby railway station site."

The report also took one final opportunity to criticise the decision to retain the main station at Ketemarae Road, stating: "Without doubt the Normanby station is the most inconvenient of any on the line, and at the present time is most dilapidated. Some time ago I drew attention to the platform wanting repair, and it still requires it."

== Today ==
All that remains of Normanby station today are the single main line, the remnants of the former passenger platform, and the old Ravensdown depot in the disused goods yard. A highway diversion and underpass have also replaced the former overbridge at the northern end of the station, which itself had become an accident blackspot.
