= Hāwera railway station =

Railway station in Hāwera, New Zealand

Hāwera
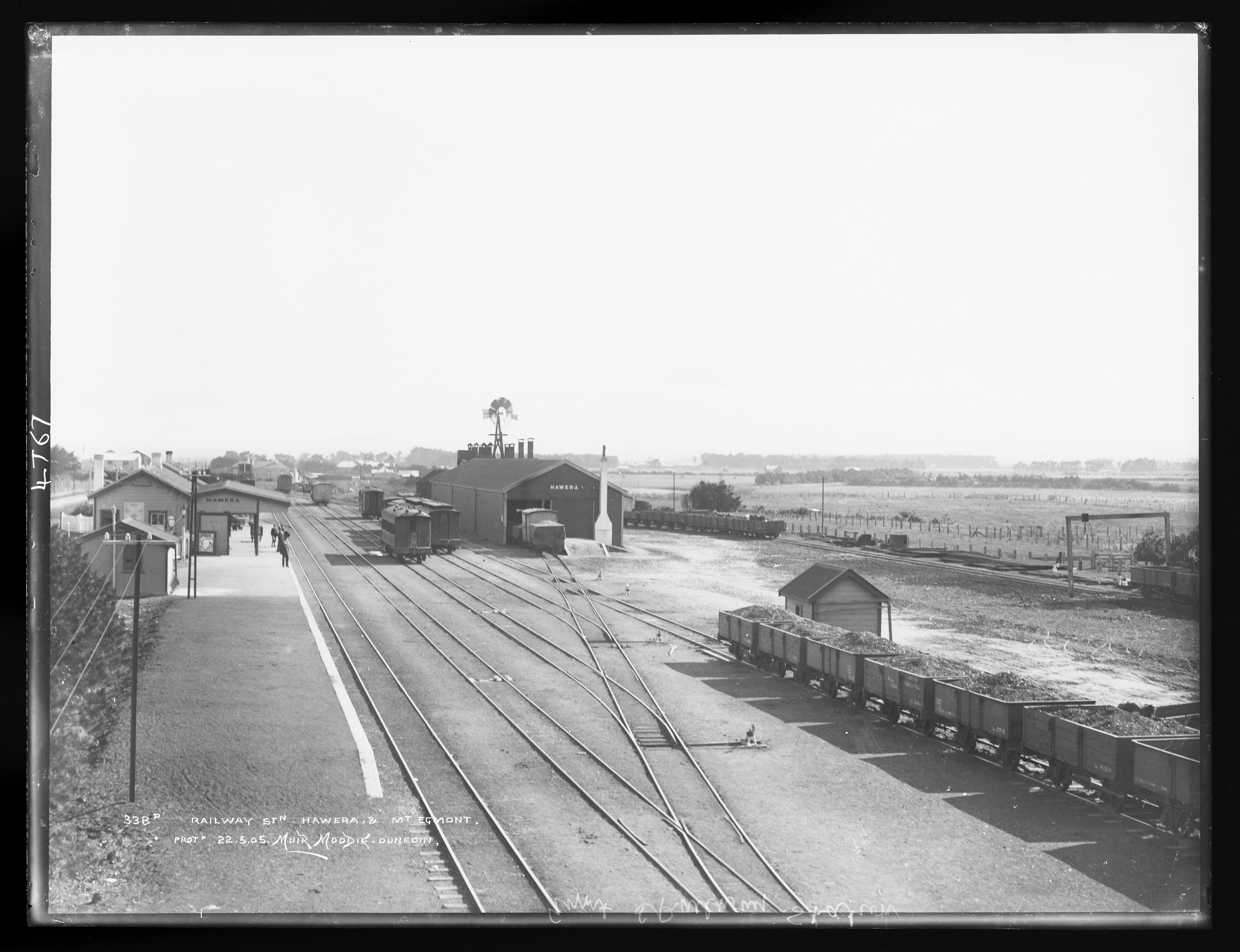
- Hāwera Railway Station in 1905, with goods shed, windmill and engine sheds (obscured).

General information
- Location: 12 Glover Road; Hāwera 4610; New Zealand
- Coordinates: 39°35′1.78″S 174°17′6.83″E
- Elevation: 73 metres (240 ft)
- System: New Zealand Government Railways (NZGR); Regional rail
- Line: Marton–New Plymouth line
- Distance: 132.97 kilometres (82.62 mi) from Marton
- Platforms: Single side
- Tracks: 1

Construction
- Structure type: at-grade
- Parking: yes
- Architect: Ivan Clarkson (1968 station)
- Architectural style: Vogel-era (1881 building); Mid-century modern (1968 building)

History
- Opened: 20 October 1881; 145 years ago
- Closed: Passenger: 30 July 1977; 49 years ago Freight: 1998; 28 years ago
- Rebuilt: 1 November 1968
Location
Notes
- Previous Station: Whareroa Station; Next Station: Normanby Station

Hāwera railway station was the primary rail station in Hāwera, Taranaki, New Zealand. It opened in 1881 and was situated on the Marton-New Plymouth railway.

Regular passenger services ran for 96 years until 1977 while freight services continued until services were centralised at Whareroa and Stratford. Today the former railway yard is largely empty. However, the 1960s-era station building and 1970s-era goods shed both remain, leased to private businesses.

== History ==
Construction of the Waitara-Patea railway (as it was then known) began shortly after the completion of Taranaki's first railway line between New Plymouth and the port of Waitara. The new railway quickly worked its way south, opening to Inglewood in 1877 and Stratford in 1879.

The first train to reach Hāwera arrived on 7 July 1881, with the first to make the full journey from New Plymouth arriving on 1 August. The railway was not yet finished, and the contractor responsible for the line claimed for damages caused by running trains when the line was not yet ballasted.

The line was officially opened on 20 October 1881, with the day being declared a local public holiday. The first official train from New Plymouth had around 200 passengers. The weather was "all that could be wished for", but when the train arrived, "no attempt at any demonstration had been thought of here, and on the first train arriving, there was not even a cheer."

The line south took another four years to open. Although the railway north of Wanganui had reached Manutahi, the roughly 10-mile gap was through rough country and required bridging the Tangahoe and Manawapou rivers. The line south of Hawera finally opened on 23 March 1885.

=== Facilities ===
The initial station building was a simple Vogel-era Class 2 station building, built in five months by Mr Walton Pal (who also had the contract for the neighbouring Normanby station). Upon opening, the station consisted of the station building itself, goods shed, engine shed, water services and two station masters' houses. Requests for improvements came thick and fast, including for cattle yards and coal stores (1881), lengthening the engine shed, improving water services and fitting a crane on the goods shed (1884), moving & increasing the size of the goods shed, plus increased siding capacity (1885) and even to raise the height of the station building and platform (1889).

There were also improvements to the passenger amenities. In 1889 and again in 1892, requests were made for a verandah over the platform to shelter passengers from the Taranaki rain, and in 1898, a further request was made to enclose the ends of the verandah for shelter from the wind.

Traffic through the station grew steadily. For example, in the year ended 31 March 1932, the station sold 2,006 first-class and 34,845 second-class tickets, 24,155 cattle, 88,688 sheep & pigs, 15,800 "superficial feet" of timber and 13,753 tons of "other goods". Much of the livestock shipped from Hāwera would be bound for the freezing works in Pātea and Waitara, while dairy products (such as cheese) was sent from local dairy factories to the coolstores in Pātea and New Plymouth port.

=== Other Features ===
Hāwera Railway Station building on 26 April 1901, including the refreshment room building to the left of the main station.

==== Refreshment Rooms ====
In 1896, refreshment room designed for sit-down meals was opened in a separate building west of the main station building. Initially, running this was contracted out to a private enterprise. This changed on 26 October 1917 when the room was brought under the refreshment branch of the railways. Around the same time, the rooms were adjusted to a counter service instead.

When the station was replaced in 1968, a new cafeteria was included in the design. These continued until services were cancelled in 1977.

==== Station Gardens ====
In 1932, handsome flower gardens were created on either side of Hāwera railway station, adjacent to Glover Road. They included flower beds, rockeries, pergolas and a turf walk. The gardens were developed by the station master, Robert Allwright, in conjunction with the local beautifying society. One report in 1935 described thee gardens as follows: "flanking the station on either side are two glorious flower gardens which at present are flaming riot of colour resplendent in their summer glory" and later "the bed of pansies and violas was wonderful and showed that even last summer's heat had not killed them all, as in so many places." In 1937 there were again mentioned as "the exquisite Hawera Railway Station gardens, known to passengers from far and near".

After the war, the Hāwera community again contributed to beautifying the station environs. In 1963, trees were donated by the Hawera Rotarians, which were planted "on the small reserve on Glover Road near the station".

==== Hawera Race Course platform ====
The Hawera Race Course platform was located 1 mile 30 chains north of Hāwera station. Opening in 1883, it was a simple platform on the left side of the track, adjacent to the Egmont Racing Club's horse track. Trains only stopped there when specially instructed, usually on race days. It closed in 1964.

=== Modernization ===
Calls for a new station at Hāwera were being made in the early 1950s, although a spokesman for the Hāwera Chamber of Commerce said in 1950 that the chamber, with other local bodies, had been raising the question since 1920. In May 1950 the chamber and the borough and county councils sent a combined deputation to the Minister of Works, W. S. Goosman, during a visit to the town. Beforehand, the chamber had described the existing station as very old and its provision for goods traffic as inadequate, and had proposed a new station to the north, towards Normanby, with the railway yards extended and new shunting lines provided. At the meeting the mayor, L. H. Clapham, called a new station urgent and described the railway yards as among the worst in New Zealand for facilities, while the chamber's F. A. Rodie said the main building accommodated a staff of 18 and that extending it would only delay a new station. The Minister gave an assurance that arrangements to remove the danger and inconvenience at the Tawhiti railway crossing at the station, including separate provision for pedestrians and cyclists and for motorists, would probably be made the following year. He also said his department would probably provide new station buildings in preference to extending the existing ones.

The question was still unresolved in 1953. In May the borough council asked the Member of Parliament for Patea, W. A. Sheat, to press the government for a new station or, failing that, to have a revised layout approved by the council put into effect. Sheat said he would support the request, but criticised the council for not raising the matter with the Royal Commission that had inquired into the railway system about a year earlier. He also said the council had rejected an offer relating to the elimination of the Tawhiti crossing, which he described as the first step towards reorganising the yards and providing a new station, and that this had prejudiced its case. Clapham disputed that the approach was belated, saying the commission had discussed the matter with Taranaki local bodies at Stratford. In September the chamber resolved to tell the Railways Management Commission that it viewed the state of the station and its amenities with alarm and had been led to believe that proposed alterations had been shelved, describing the situation as a "thorough disgrace" to the town.

The following month, the Railways Department's senior architect, Ivan. M. Clarkson, announced new colour schemes for the New Plymouth, Hāwera and Stratford stations, to be applied in time for the Royal visit in January. He said the buildings were being repainted because they needed it, and that the department wanted to brighten the stations in line with contemporary ideas of colour. At Hāwera the street side was to be pale apple green (chartreuse) with an olive-green base and terracotta doors, and the station side peach with terracotta doors and steelwork.

By the late 1950s, the station facilities still needed upgrading. Goods traffic had required the enlargement of the goods shed, and steam traction was giving way to diesel. Traffic patterns were also shifting, which had an impact on Hāwera station.

The first change was the closing of the locomotive depot in the early 1960s. This coincided with Ōpunake branch trains changing to operating out of Stratford after the cancellation of passenger services on the line.

In 1968, a contract for the construction of a new station building was let to Madder & Bourne of Wanganui for the price of $84,000. The new station was designed by the New Zealand Railways Chief Architect Ivan M. Clarkson in the fashionable mid-century modern style, with large windows and brick veneer. The structure was 69m long and 10m wide. It included a waiting room at the Eastern end, a cafeteria in the Western end, and station offices in the middle. At the same time, the station's water tower was removed.

In September 1974 another contract was let, with time for a replacement goods shed. The replacement shed (built by Boon Brothers of New Plymouth) was 37m long and 17m wide, and constructed with a steel frame and concrete block walls up to 2.5m above ground level, with aluminium sides above and roof. An office and amenity block was built alongside, at a price of $125,000. It opened in September 1975.

== Services ==
The first rail services were mixed services, with one or more passenger carriages attached to the local goods trains. Initial timetables showed two mixed services a day to and from New Plymouth, with a stagecoach connection to the southern railhead (initially at Waverley, then Pātea, then Manutahi). Once the line south was completed, mixed services ran the full distance of the line, connecting settlements right along the line.

In December 1886, the first "express" passenger service started with the introduction of the New Plymouth Express, initially on Tuesdays and Fridays only. Services quickly became daily, as the train formed part of the fastest route between Auckland and Wellington (by train and steamship).

Mixed services continued to serve stations bypassed by the express service. In 1914 for example, in addition to the Express, there were mixed services between Hāwera-New Plymouth and Hāwera-Wanganui, as well as the New Plymouth-Wanganui and New Plymouth-Palmerston North mixed trains that stopped at the station.

On 12 July 1926 services from Hawera to Ōpunake were introduced, initially three times a week. Also launched in 1926 was the Taranaki Flyer, a new passenger-only service between New Plymouth and Wanganui that replaced one of the mixed services on the line. In April 1938 another new service was launched, when an evening Wellington-New Plymouth service was started using the newly introduced RM class Standard railcars.

By the 1940s, the railways had started introducing road services to replace slower mixed trains, including one running between Wanganui and New Plymouth, on a similar timetable to the express. This was part of a deliberate move to replace mixed services with road services where possible. This, plus increased road competition, led to reduced passenger services out of Hāwera.

The first to go was service to Ōpunake, which ended on 16 October 1955. Two weeks later (31 October 1955) the Express and Taranaki Flyer services were replaced with Standard (and occasionally 88 seater) railcars, running to a faster timetable. The flyer service was closed just over three years later, and by 1972 evening services were down to Fridays and Sundays only. On 18 December 1972 the daytime railcar service was replaced with the Blue Streak railcar service. The service took just 6½ hours, but the mechanical condition of the railcars meant that final passenger service ran on Friday, 30 July 1977. From this point, all passenger traffic was carried on the competing Road Service coaches.

== Decline & Today ==
After the cancellation of passenger services, the station remained busy with freight. After transport deregulation in 1986, the railways faced increasing competition. Gradually, general freight traffic fell, and the station was closed in 1998, with the closest facilities becoming Eltham and Whareroa.

Today, the goods yard is entirely gone, leaving just a single main line beside the station platform. The 1968 building remains alongside a single main track. Occasional excursion trains stop at the platform, while businesses occupy the former station's offices and cafeteria. The former goods shed also still stands (minus railway access) and is currently used as a distribution centre for a local business. The formerly landscaped land alongside Glover Road has also been cleared and new fencing erected, with some land sold and built on.
