= Inglewood railway station, New Zealand =

Railway station in Inglewood

Inglewood
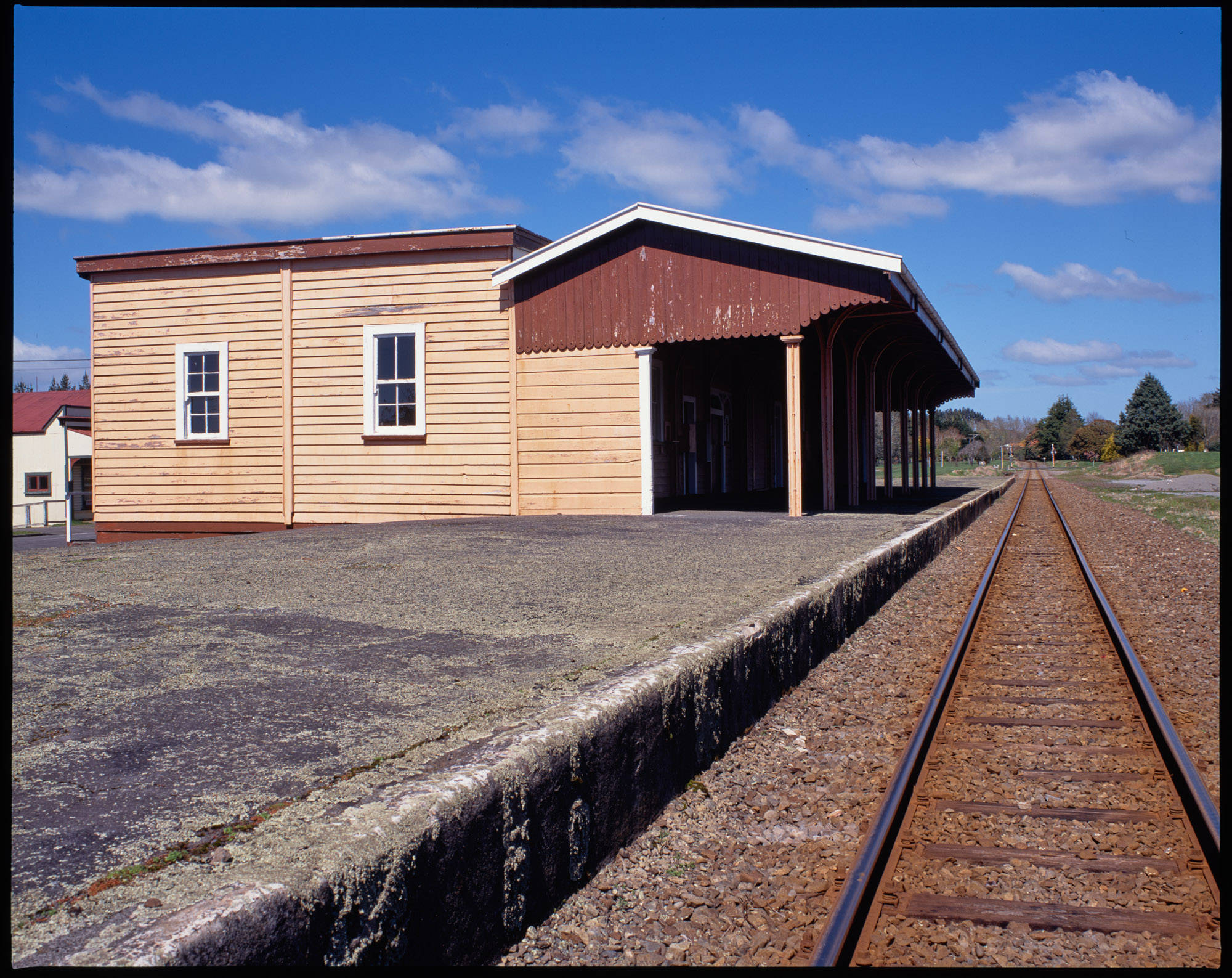
- Inglewood Railway Station in September 2001

General information
- Location: 35 Moa Street; Inglewood 4330; New Zealand
- Coordinates: 39°09′26.4888″S 174°12′29.0304″E
- Elevation: 202 metres (663 ft)
- System: New Zealand Government Railways (NZGR); Regional rail
- Line: Marton–New Plymouth line
- Distance: 183.45 kilometres (113.99 mi) from Marton
- Platforms: Single side

Construction
- Structure type: at-grade
- Parking: No
- Architectural style: Modified Vogel class 4

Other information
- Classification: RHTNZ Category B building

History
- Opened: 30 November 1877
- Closed: 21 January 1983 (passengers); 22 September 1986 (freight)

Heritage New Zealand – Category 1
- Designated: 9 September 2009
- Reference no.: 9352
Location
Notes
- Previous Station: Durham Road Station; Next Station: Waiongona Station

Inglewood railway station is a single-platform railway station on the Marton - New Plymouth Line serving the town of Inglewood in New Zealand's Taranaki district. Located on Moa Street, the station is the oldest remaining railway station in New Zealand still on its original site.

Inglewood railway station remained open for passenger services until the last scheduled train ran on 21 January 1983. Currently, freight trains go past the station but do not stop.

== History ==
The Inglewood station was erected in 1877 and included the station building, passenger platform (including a cart approach to platform), 58 ft x 31 ft goods shed, loading bank, two-stall engine shed, stationmaster's house & urinals. The original contract specified a Vogel Class 5 station be built, but as it turned out a class 4 building was constructed. There was also a yard with 3 loops (capacity of 20 wagons, 17 wagons & 17 wagons respectively, plus a 3-wagon back shunt.

No sooner had the station opened than a new contract was let to extend the building, and further work was mentioned in 1880 (for adding a water supply), in 1884 (general improvements), 1896 (to extend the platform and add verandah), 1897 (enlarging and altering station and to add sheep yards) and 1916 (general improvements).

The engine shed is not listed in the next review of facilities in 1897 and was likely closed soon after the line was opened to Stratford in 1879.

=== Post & Telegraph Office ===
For 23 years from 1878, the station was also home to the Inglewood Post Office. Located in an extension to the northern end of the building, this was initially operated by railways staff before the railway and post office business was separated in 1897. Two years later, the postal department installed a soundproof box for the telephone office, but in 1901 the post office was removed from the station and into a separate building in town.

=== Town Beautification ===
Inglewood railway station is situated right at the heart of the village, and it wasn't long after the station opened that request for improvements to the general appearance of the railway were lodged. In 1882 requests were made for the planting of willow trees along the railway south of the station, followed in 1889, 1892 and 1894 with requests for permission by the town board to fence and plant the railway reserve.

In 1912 the Inglewood Band Rotunda was built on the North-East corner of the railway reserve. This is now a category 2 heritage structure.

In August 1924, Inglewood’s war memorial (marble figure of the ‘sorrowing soldier‘) was unveiled in the North-West corner of the railway reserve, along with pre-1850 rhododendron hybrid ‘Sir Robert Peel’ which still stands and is reputed to be one of the largest rhododendrons in the southern hemisphere.

Inglewood Railway Station in 1885, before the verandah was built. The Post & Telegraph office is on the left end of the building. The many extensions are clear to see in this image.

== Services ==
In its early years, mixed train services were the norm. Although the line to Inglewood wasn't officially opened until 30 November 1877, advertisements show limited services on Tuesdays and Saturdays running from 4 September 1877. A timetable for 1884 (before the through line to Wanganui was completed) shows morning and afternoon services in each direction, taking a full hour for the journey south to Stratford, and one hour twenty-five minutes northbound to New Plymouth.

From December 1886 the New Plymouth Express was introduced, running the full length of the line to Longburn where passengers changed to trains operated by the Wellington and Manawatu Railway Company to complete their journey to Wellington. This service was faster than the mixed services, but the initial journey time from New Plymouth to Wellington was still 14 hours 50 minutes. The service became the premier service for the lower North Island, providing connections with steamer boat services to Auckland.

A second passenger-only service through the station was introduced in 1926. Called the Taranaki Flyer this service ran between New Plymouth and Wanganui daily. On 3 September 1933 the nighttime New Plymouth Night Express began operating between New Plymouth, Taumaranui and Auckland. Railcars services began running through Inglewood from April 1938 when the RM class Standard railcars began an evening service to Wellington. Eventually these and the newer 88 seater railcars took over all passenger services though Inglewood.

However, from the late 1950's passenger services started reducing. The first to go was the Flyer service to Wanganui, with its final service running on 7 February 1959. From 30 July 1977 all passenger services linking Inglewood with stations south of Stratford ended with the withdrawal of the Blue Streak railcars (the final successor to the New Plymouth Express). Finally, on 21 January 1983, the New Plymouth - Taumaranui carriage train (final daytime successor to the New Plymouth Night Express) was terminated, ending all passenger services to Inglewood. By this time all remaining mixed services had also been withdrawn.

=== Current Services ===
The only services that currently pass through are freight services between New Plymouth and points south (services north via the Stratford–Okahukura Line having ended in November 2009 when that line was mothballed). Inglewood no longer has any freight facilities, and the passing loop (along with the station's semaphore signals) was removed at some point in the 1990s.

== Today ==
Although train services no longer stop at Inglewood railway station, the building and platform survive along with a former goods loading ramp. The station building was given a Category 1 rating by Heritage New Zealand in 2009. Part of the station yard is fenced off and used for parking, while the railway reserve also contains the town's war memorial and a band rotunda.
