= Manutahi railway station =

Railway station in New Zealand

Manutahi

General information
- Location: Manutahi Station Road; Manutahi 4598; New Zealand
- Coordinates: 39°39′54.8″S 174°24′47.9″E
- Elevation: 109 m (358 ft)
- System: New Zealand Government Railways (NZGR); Regional rail
- Line: Marton–New Plymouth line
- Distance: 193.19 km (120.04 mi) from Marton
- Platforms: Single side

Construction
- Structure type: At-grade
- Parking: No

History
- Opened: 23 August 1883; 143 years ago
- Closed: 23 March 1964; 62 years ago (passengers); 31 January 1982; 44 years ago (freight)
- Rebuilt: 1888
Location
Notes
- Previous station: Ball Road Station; Next station: Mokoia Station

Manutahi railway station was a rural railway station on the Marton–New Plymouth line serving the settlements of Manutahi and Alton in New Zealand's Taranaki district. It was the point where the northern and southern railheads met during the construction of the Marton–New Plymouth line in 1885. The station is now closed to all traffic, but a crossing loop at Manutahi remains in use for passing freight trains.

== History ==
=== Railhead terminus (1883–1885) ===
The coastal railway from Waverley reached the Manutahi district in the early 1880s. A 17 mi (27 km) section from Waverley to Manutahi opened on 28 August 1883, making Manutahi the temporary northern railhead for trains from Wanganui. Preparations for the station began several years before through services commenced. In 1881 the Railways Department and the Patea Road Board were already considering an approach road to the prospective station site on the south side of the Whenuakura valley. Station buildings and staff housing followed: by 1883–84 contracts had been let for station buildings and three railway cottages, with water supply and drainage works for the yard also under way.

Befitting its status as the railhead, the station complex was built with the following facilities:

- Station building with station master's office, waiting room, ladies waiting room and a Post & Telegraph office
- Goods shed and stockyards
- Engine shed and coal shed

=== Opening as a through station ===
The final 9 mi 7 ch (about 15 km) gap between Manutahi and Hāwera was completed on 23 March 1885, giving a continuous railway between Wellington and New Plymouth and establishing Manutahi as an intermediate station on the through route. Soon after the completion of the line to Hāwera, the station was downgraded. In April 1885 Manutahi ceased to be a booking station and its passenger building was removed for reuse at Feilding, leaving the locality served by a simpler flag station. Despite this, Manutahi remained the principal railhead for the surrounding farming district and for the small township that grew up around it.

The approach to the station was a persistent local concern. From the early 1880s farmers and residents petitioned for a properly formed and metalled road, complaining that the muddy track made it difficult to haul produce and to meet the trains. Responsibility for funding and maintenance was disputed between the Patea Road Board and the Railways Department, and correspondence over the station road continued into the 1890s, with further proposals for improvements and a new approach road recorded as late as 1901 and 1904.

The present-day Manutahi Station Road, which connects the station site to State Highway 3, follows the general line of this access route.

=== Facilities and operations ===
By the mid-1890s Manutahi had a typical rural station layout for the Marton–New Plymouth line. An accommodation shelter shed on a passenger platform stood on the main line, with a cart approach from the road, a loading bank, and cattle yards nearby. Two passing loops and a backshunt could accommodate around 30 wagons each, reflecting modest but significant freight activity.

An inventory compiled in 1911 shows Manutahi with an enlarged yard: a 40 ft by 30 ft (12 m by 9 m) goods shed, loading bank, cattle and sheep yards, fixed signals, a shelter shed and platform, and loops that could hold up to 41 wagons, plus a backshunt for a further 27 wagons. A hut for the tablet porter was added in 1919 as part of the tablet signalling system on the line.

As a small intermediate station between Pātea and Hāwera, Manutahi was primarily served by mixed trains carrying passengers, mail and freight. Regional histories of the Patea district note that early services on the line were slow mixed trains, with later improvements including faster passenger-only services from the late 1920s and the introduction of Standard railcars in 1939 on the New Plymouth–Wellington route, which also passed through Manutahi.

Freight traffic from the surrounding dairy and sheep farms dominated the station's business. The presence of cattle and sheep yards, a substantial goods shed and long loops indicates regular livestock loading and general freight such as fertiliser, farm supplies and produce.

=== Decline and closure ===
By the mid-20th century passenger numbers at Manutahi had dwindled. Rail Heritage Trust station records note that there was effectively no passenger traffic by March 1964, and approval was given the following month to remove the timber-fronted passenger platform. The station closed to passenger traffic on 23 March 1964.

Freight operations also gradually reduced. The stockyards were closed in March 1972, reflecting changes in livestock handling and the shift of traffic to road transport. By July 1980 the yard layout had been simplified, with shorter loops recorded in the station inventory. Manutahi closed completely to all traffic on 31 January 1982.

Following closure most of the station structures were removed. The goods shed, yards, and other buildings were dismantled or relocated, leaving only the track, formation and approach road as evidence of the former station.

== Present day ==
Despite the closure of the station, the location has retained strategic value for train operations. In the early 2010s KiwiRail reintroduced a crossing loop at Manutahi to help relieve capacity constraints on the Marton–New Plymouth line, particularly for heavy milk trains running between Whareroa and Patea.

A 2013 report by the Rail & Maritime Transport Union describes the “new crossing loop at Manutahi” as having been reintroduced in 2011 and initially built with a relatively short loop and hand-operated points. The loop was later lengthened to about 550 m and brought under Centralised Traffic Control (CTC), which made it more useful for crossing full-length freight trains.

KiwiRail's Local Network Instructions for the Marton–New Plymouth Line describe Manutahi Loop as a CTC-controlled crossing loop on a section with steep embankments beside the road. The document notes crew-change pads at both ends of the loop and specifies that trains using the loop are limited to 40 km/h through the turnouts, with access for crews via a walkway and steps from Upper Manutahi Road.

No station building, platform or goods facilities remain at Manutahi. The crossing loop, signalling equipment and formation are the only active railway features, with the surrounding land used for farming.
