= Pariroa Pa railway station =

Railway station in South Taranaki, New Zealand

Pariroa Pa

General information
- Location: Pariroa Road; Patea 4598; New Zealand
- Coordinates: 39°43′31.9″S 174°28′02.2″E
- Elevation: 20 metres (66 ft)
- System: New Zealand Government Railways (NZGR); Regional rail
- Line: Marton–New Plymouth line
- Platforms: Single side
- Tracks: 1 (formerly a passing loop)

Construction
- Structure type: at-grade
- Parking: no

History
- Opened: 28 August 1883; 143 years ago
- Closed: Passenger: 15 October 1940; 86 years ago Freight: 30 May 1958; 68 years ago
- Former names: Hukatere (until 1 April 1902)
Location
Notes
- Previous Station: Pātea Station; Next Station: Kakaramea Station

Pariroa Pa railway station, originally named Hukatere, was a rural railway station on the Marton–New Plymouth line in Taranaki, New Zealand, between Kakaramea and Pātea. From 1894 the station stood adjacent to the newly established Pariroa Pā, and it was renamed after the marae in 1902. It closed to all traffic in 1958.

== History ==
Land for the station, then known as Hukatere, was taken in October 1882, and authority for sidings and a gravelled approach road costing £445 was sought the following month. Construction continued through 1883 and 1884, including further authorised works and a set of platelayers' cottages. The approach road proved a persistent difficulty for the local Road Board: in 1884 the Patea West Road Board asked the minister of public works to repair "the portion of Wilson Road made by the Government leading to the Hukatere Station", and in 1892 the Patea County Council reported the road to the station "impassable for heavy loads", suspending its gravel-carting contract as a result.

=== Pariroa Pā and the 1902 renaming ===
From 1894 the station stood immediately adjacent to the newly founded Pariroa Pā, a marae of Ngāti Ruanui. The marae's name was already in local use as an address well before the railway's own records caught up with it. For example, an 1896 advertisement for the sale of pigs gave the vendor's address simply as "Pariroa Pah, Hukatere Station". The station was formally renamed Pariroa Pa on 1 April 1902. The spelling "Pariroa Pah" remained in common use for some years afterward, including in a 1936 New Zealand Herald feature on the Taranaki Flyer, which named it among the service's request stops.

== Facilities ==
The station was modestly equipped throughout its life: a shelter shed rather than a full station building, a passenger platform on the left side of the line, a loading bank and urinals. A small goods shed, 30 by 20 feet, was noted in 1888 as "not much used". The station's siding capacity was expanded over time, from a pair of 19-wagon loops in the early 1900s to a single 24-wagon loop by 1911. By 1940 the loop was approved for lifting, leaving only a siding.

== Services ==
Pariroa Pa was served generally by mixed train services on the line, as well as a request stop on the Taranaki Flyer, in keeping with its status as a minor rural halt rather than a scheduled stop for the line's express services. Passenger services ceased on 15 October 1940, decades before most other stations on this section of the line, reflecting how little use the stop saw by the late 1930s. Freight traffic continued on a reduced basis until the station closed entirely on 30 May 1958.

== Accidents and incidents ==
In September 1907, the midday train from Pātea to New Plymouth struck a bullock that had strayed onto the line near the station. The impact buckled the engine's cow-catcher, derailing the locomotive and several wagons down an embankment; the driver was thrown clear, and a wagon of cattle overturned but its occupants escaped uninjured.

In July 1922, an unidentified man in his sixties or seventies was struck and killed by the evening train from Hāwera, roughly a mile short of the station. He had left the refreshment rooms at Pātea on foot shortly after the mail train's departure; nothing but a rail ticket and an unattributed savings bank receipt was found on him.

In July 1925, Fred Stevens, a well-known Hāwera resident and organiser for the Liberal League, fell from the mail train near the station and was killed. Stevens had spent the afternoon in Pātea with local MP J. R. Corrigan before boarding the train alone; his absence was not noticed until the guard returned to his carriage with change for his fare. His body was found beside the track on a bend just north of the station.

== Today ==
The station closed to all traffic on 30 May 1958. No road now reaches the former station site, and nothing of the station remains visible at ground level. The station site earthworks are, however, still discernible in LiDAR elevation data.
