= Bell Block railway station =

Railway station in Bell Block, New Zealand

Bell Block

General information
- Location: Okey Lane; Bell Block; New Plymouth 4312; New Zealand
- Coordinates: 39°02′30.8″S 174°08′49.0″E
- Elevation: 33 metres (108 ft)
- System: New Zealand Government Railways (NZGR); Regional rail
- Line: Marton–New Plymouth line
- Distance: 1,201.57 kilometres (746.62 mi) from Marton
- Platforms: Single side
- Tracks: 1

Construction
- Structure type: at-grade
- Parking: yes
- Architectural style: Shelter Shed

History
- Opened: 14 October 1875; 151 years ago
- Closed: Passenger: 31 May 1976; 50 years ago Freight: 22 September 1986; 40 years ago (except for wagon loads)
- Former names: Henwood Road
Location
Notes
- Previous Station: Corbertt Road Station; Next Station: Egmont Road Station

Bell Block railway station was a railway station on the Marton–New Plymouth line in Taranaki, New Zealand. It opened on 14 October 1875 under the name Henwood Road as one of the original stops on Taranaki's first railway. The station was later renamed Bell Block on 19 September 1906. It closed to all except wagonloads of freight on 22 September 1986.

== Early years ==
Henwood Road station was established when the New Plymouth–Waitara section of the railway officially opened on 14 October 1875. It was one of several original wayside stopping places on the line, situated just over 7 km from New Plymouth. Trains halted there on request, primarily to serve local farming residents and small freight consignments.

At the time of opening, the station had little infrastructure beyond a short wooden platform to facilitate boarding and alighting. In June 1876, a request was submitted for the erection of a passenger shelter, followed in 1878 by a request to install a siding. There was also early criticism from ratepayers concerning the poor state of the road access to the station.

By 1885, local farmers applied to erect cattle yards, indicating a growing role in stock traffic. By 1898, Henwood Road had developed the following facilities:

- Accommodation shelter shed and platform
- Cattle and sheep yards
- Cart approach providing access to the station
- Loop siding capable of holding 21 wagons

The station was initially served by two mixed services per day, carrying passengers and freight. On 3 December 1886, through trains began operating twice weekly between New Plymouth and Wellington - initially on Tuesdays and Fridays only. The express only stopped at principal stations along the route.

The express trains were intended for long-distance passengers and did not cater to local travel. In 1901, a passenger attempting to board the express service at Henwood Road and travel to nearby Inglewood was refused unless they purchased a ticket all the way to Hāwera - the minimum distance allowed from an intermediate stop.

Picnic trains to fields near the station were a popular attraction during this period. In December 1890, a Band of Hope picnic was held near Henwood Road, with tickets sold in New Plymouth and three special trains running to the event at 12:00 pm, 1:00 pm, and 2:15 pm, followed by return trips at 5:45 pm, 6:35 pm, and 7:25 pm. Similarly, in 1906, the Church of England organised a Sunday School picnic at the site, with special trains operated for the occasion. The old picnic ground was sold in 1919, ending the tradition.

In September 1906, the station's name was officially changed to Bell Block, aligning it with the name of the surrounding district. The "Bell Block" name referred to a blockhouse constructed nearby during the New Zealand Wars, and to the Bell family who had settled in the area.

== A rural station ==
Following its renaming in 1906, Bell Block station settled into the typical pattern of many rural stops, serving the surrounding farming community with modest passenger and freight traffic. During this period, it played a secondary role on the Marton–New Plymouth Line, with local trains stopping by request and freight largely consisting of livestock, fertiliser, and seasonal produce.

At some point during the early 20th century, Bell Block was upgraded to a tablet station, enabling it to manage train crossings and block control on the single-track line. However, this responsibility appears to have been short-lived. By 1919, records show that the station's 21 ft by 7 ft shelter shed had been divided into two rooms, likely to accommodate the tablet instruments. A 1919 inspection noted: "Tablets have since been removed to Smart Road", rendering the partition unnecessary. This suggests that tablet control had been transferred to Smart Road station by that time, and Bell Block was no longer staffed for that purpose.

One final improvement to facilities came in 1924. After pressure from the local Farmers' Union, it was announced that authority had been granted for the building of a new 23 ft x 13 ft goods shed. Bell Block retained this configuration—with shelter shed, goods shed, loop siding, and livestock yards—for the next three decades.

After World War II, the station began to decline in importance. In 1955, the stockyards, loading bank, and goods shed were removed or demolished. In 1957, a tender was issued for the removal of all remaining structures. The original shelter shed was briefly replaced by a portable 12 ft by 7 ft lean-to, though this too was only temporary. In February 1963, the timber-fronted platform was dismantled to allow for yard redevelopment. Although the station technically remained open for passenger services until 31 May 1976, these removals meant that Bell Block was no longer equipped with safe or practical passenger facilities, effectively ending its usability as a stop for travellers.

== Industrial growth and decline ==
From the 1960s, Bell Block's rural character gave way to a new industrial identity. As New Plymouth expanded northeastward, Bell Block became a key site for light industrial development. Its proximity to the main line and existing yard infrastructure made it an attractive location for private freight sidings serving local businesses. Over the next two decades, several industrial spurs were constructed:

- In 1963, a siding was built for the McKechnie Brothers factory.
- In 1965, sidings for Duncan & Davies nurseries and E.C.C. (Transformers & Controls) Ltd
- In 1968, a new siding for Canada & NZ Associated Cable Co..
- In 1970, a siding to N.R.M. Feeds Ltd.
- In 1975, a new siding for Fletcher Steel.

These developments turned Bell Block into a light industrial freight hub. While general station facilities had been removed by the early 1960s, rail traffic in and out of the yard remained active throughout the 1970s, 80s and 90s. On 22 September 1986, Bell Block was closed to public freight traffic other than private sidings.

== Present day ==
As of 2025, Bell Block functions only as a lineside location on the Marton–New Plymouth Line. The former sidings and yard connections have been disconnected. KiwiRail's Local Network Instructions record that the site's lever-worked loop connection has had its switch lock removed and is unavailable for use. The former yard area is now part of New Plymouth's Bell Block industrial zone, which is oriented to road transport, and mainline freight trains pass through without stopping. Some remnants of sidings survive but are now unused and overgrown, with tracks in various stages of disrepair or removal.
