= Ball Road railway station =

Former railway station in Taranaki, New Zealand

Ball Road

General information
- Location: Ball Road; Alton; New Zealand
- Coordinates: 39°41′11.5″S 174°25′49.8″E
- Elevation: 100 metres (330 ft)
- System: New Zealand Government Railways (NZGR); Regional rail
- Line: Marton–New Plymouth line
- Distance: 59 mi 16 ch (approx. 95.3 km (59.2 mi)) from New Plymouth
- Platforms: Single, right side
- Tracks: 1

Construction
- Structure type: At-grade

History
- Opened: 28 August 1883; 143 years ago
- Closed: 23 October 1977; 49 years ago (freight); 28 October 1977; 49 years ago (reopened for Alton Dairy Company traffic only); 27 October 1978; 48 years ago (closed for all traffic)
Location
Notes
- Previous Station: Kakaramea; Next Station: Manutahi Station

Ball Road railway station was a rural railway station on the Marton–New Plymouth line, serving the Alton and Hurleyville settlements of South Taranaki, New Zealand. It served the surrounding farming district for around 95 years, from its construction in 1883 until its final closure in 1978.

== History ==
=== Naming and construction ===
The station took its name from Ball Road, itself named after James Ball, one of the earliest Pākehā settlers in the Pātea district, who had arrived around 1850 and later served during the Taranaki Wars, where his bravery was noted and rewarded with a revolver presented by the government after hostilities ended. The nearby settlement, first surveyed in the 1870s and initially known as Woodville, was renamed Alton by 1887 to avoid confusion with the North Island town of the same name.

Before construction, an alternative name for the station was considered: in January 1883 the Public Works Department recommended it be called "Mungaroa" (a potential misspelling of Mangaroa), after the nearby Mangaroa Stream. The name was not adopted, and the station opened as Ball Road on 28 August 1883, as part of the same 17-mile section from Waverley to Manutahi that also opened Pātea and Manutahi stations that day.

=== The fight for a goods shed ===
Despite serving a farming district, Ball Road went without a goods shed for well over a decade after opening. Petitions and requests were recorded in 1889, 1890, 1892 and 1893, and in February 1895 the Hurleyville Dairy Company specifically pressed for one to be built. As late as July 1889, the department's position had been that the traffic expected at the station "would not warrant the erecting of a goods shed, or removing the Hukatere shed". A goods shed measuring 30 by 15 feet, with a verandah over the doorway and an estimated cost of £75, was finally authorised in 1899.

=== Facilities and the 1908 deputation ===
By 1896, Ball Road had an accommodation shelter shed, a passenger platform with a cart approach, a loading bank and urinals, served by a loop able to hold 21 wagons; the loop's capacity grew to 25 wagons the following year and remained at that level for over a decade. A cart dock had been constructed by December 1904, and further amenities followed for the surrounding farming community: an enclosure for settlers' horses in 1908, and, after settlers requested a means to water their horses, a 400-gallon water tank installed later that year.

In June 1908, a Taranaki deputation raised the station's lack of mail-train stopping rights directly with the Minister of Railways in Wellington. The deputation argued that of 777 people living in the district served by Manutahi, Kakaramea and Ball Road stations, 377 lived on Ball Road itself, an area with three creameries and a dairy factory, and that it was a greater hardship for these residents to arrive home late than for those at stations where the mail train already stopped. The Minister agreed the change seemed advantageous, though he remarked candidly that if it were up to him he would run the mail train straight through from Pātea to Hāwera without intermediate stops at all, leaving local traffic to a separate train.

In October 1912, £60 was authorised for alterations to the shelter shed, raising the building by around three feet and adding a further room with lavatory accommodation. A petition for the appointment of a caretaker followed in August 1913, and by October 1916 the station's facilities included a station building, stockyards abutting the platform, latrines, a loading bank and goods shed, with separate approach roads off Ball Road to the passenger platform and goods yard; an application that year for additional stockyards was declined.

=== Pilfering and calls for a stationmaster ===
In November 1920, Wanganui MP W. D. Powdrell raised a parliamentary question over pilfering at the unstaffed station, asking the Minister of Railways whether traffic levels warranted appointing a stationmaster, or failing that, building a house and appointing a permanent ganger to keep watch over the yard and adjacent line. The station was described as serving a large area of back country and four small townships.

== Decline and closure ==
The station's original men's lavatory, built in 1884, was destroyed by fire in November 1950. In July 1956, the station building itself was sold for £15 to the Egmont–Wanganui Rodeo Association, though goods and loop facilities continued in use. That November, a work train operated between Pātea and Hāwera, lifting empty wagons and collecting sleepers left alongside the track between Ball Road and Kakaramea.

By December 1970, the goods shed had been converted to a loading shelter for cheese traffic, with a raised wooden platform built into one corner to allow small-lot consignments to be stored off the ground and under cover, doing away with the need for a separate shelter shed. By 1974 the goods loop's capacity had been reduced to 16 wagons, and the loading bank was removed that June.

The station closed to general traffic on 23 October 1977, but reopened just five days later, on 28 October, to continue serving the Alton Dairy Company's traffic alone. It closed to all traffic for the final time on 27 October 1978, with the department noting that the Kakaramea-based carriers How & Walkington had agreed to centre their loading and unloading at Pātea instead, and that satisfactory arrangements had been made for the Alton Dairy Company to load its products at Pātea using a newly acquired forklift. A road overbridge at Ball Road was recorded as under construction the following year.
