= Kakaramea railway station =

Railway station in South Taranaki, New Zealand

Kakaramea

General information
- Location: Kakaramea Road; Kakaramea 4598; New Zealand
- Coordinates: 39°42′14.7″S 174°27′00.7″E
- Elevation: 73 metres (240 ft)
- System: New Zealand Government Railways (NZGR); Regional rail
- Line: Marton–New Plymouth line
- Platforms: Single side
- Tracks: 1

Construction
- Structure type: at-grade
- Parking: yes
- Architectural style: 5th class station building

History
- Opened: 28 August 1883; 143 years ago
- Closed: Passenger: before October 1955 (exact date unknown); Freight: 20 July 1980; 46 years ago
Location
Notes
- Previous Station: Pariroa Pa Station; Next Station: Ball Road Station

Kakaramea railway station was a rural railway station on the Marton–New Plymouth line in Taranaki, New Zealand, serving the township of Kakaramea between Ball Road and Pariroa Pa. It opened on 28 August 1883 and remained a staffed station for much of its life, a step up from the flag stops at its neighbouring sidings. Passenger services had ceased by October 1955, and the station closed to all traffic on 20 July 1980.

== History ==
Tenders for culverts on the section of line near Kakaramea were called in mid-1880, with the earthworks assigned to a party of unemployed men sent up from Wellington under Major Noake. By October 1882 a published plan for the district's stations described Kakaramea as smaller than the stopping stations at Pātea and Manutahi on account of its proximity to Pātea, but still equipped with a ticket office and waiting room in contrast to the unstaffed flag stops planned for Hukatere and Ball Road.

Tenders for the station buildings closed on 27 October 1882, and the contract was awarded to Jay & Haynes of Foxton for £883 14s 5d. By late December that year, a local correspondent reported the station "rapidly approaching completion", with only the goods shed floor and office still to be finished and the formation laid to within a few chains of the platform. Sidings work continued into March 1883, by which point the correspondent expected the line to open to passenger traffic within three or four months, a prediction borne out by the eventual 28 August opening.

=== Cattle yards ===
The October 1882 station plan had specifically noted that no cattle yards were considered necessary at Kakaramea, unlike the larger yards provided at Manutahi. Local settlers disagreed. The following month, Kakaramea residents held a public meeting and petitioned the Public Works Department for cattle yards at the station, a request the department agreed to consider. Cattle and sheep yards duly appear in every subsequent RHT facility record for the station, from 1886 onward.

== Facilities ==
Kakaramea was equipped as a 5th class station building with a passenger platform, cart access, a 40 by 30 foot goods shed, a loading bank, and cattle and sheep yards, a specification that remained largely unchanged through repeated inspections between the 1890s and 1900s. The yard included loop sidings for around 22 to 23 wagons plus a 12 wagon backshunt. By 1920 the station was run by a caretaker rather than a full stationmaster. In 1949, two position lower quadrant semaphore signals were installed on both approaches to the station, brought into use on 3 May that year.

== Access and the level crossing ==
The road connecting the station to the main road was a recurring source of local complaint. In 1882 and 1883 the Patea West Road Board pressed the government to form and gravel the Kakaramea station road to the same standard as those at Waverley and Manutahi, citing heavy traffic to and from a nearby flourmill. In 1884 the Board again wrote to the District Engineer regarding the Kakaramea station road, and separately about the condition of the Hukatere crossing.

Visibility at the level crossing became a long running concern in the twentieth century. In 1926, a local correspondent described the crossing as "very dangerous" owing to high hedges obscuring the view of approaching trains. The same complaint resurfaced in February 1940, when the Automobile Association (South Taranaki) urged that visibility at the crossing be improved, noting that spoil thrown up by railway maintenance work was compounding the problem caused by the hedges. By October that year, the Association's annual report noted that level crossing eliminations along the wider state highway had been completed, but singled out the crossing near Kakaramea station, along with two others further north, as still requiring attention.

== Services ==
The station's status as a stopping point for the district's express services was itself a point of local contention. In 1887, Patea County Council took up a complaint that the through mail train was passing Kakaramea without stopping, while continuing to call at the smaller settlements of Manutahi and Mokoia. The Council resolved unanimously to press the government for a change.

Mail handling at the station carried its own hazards. In 1891, a local report criticised the railway's practice of collecting mail from Kakaramea's postmistress without the express train coming to a full stop, describing how she was expected to hand the mailbag up to the guard as the train passed the platform at speed, a practice the report warned put her at real risk of being caught against a carriage. On the occasion described, the guard failed to catch the bag cleanly and it fell to the platform, causing that day's Auckland mail to be missed.

A November 1911 correspondent's column captures the station at the centre of local life: between fifty and sixty people left Kakaramea for the Hawera Show on a single train, prompting the department to send out a booking clerk for the occasion, alongside notes on the local dairy factory's payout and a bachelors' ball held the same week.

== Accidents and incidents ==
In August 1944, the New Plymouth to Wellington express struck a cow that had strayed onto the line at the southern end of the Kakaramea station, derailing the locomotive and leading carriage. None of the 270 passengers aboard were injured, though the main line was blocked for several hours and a relief train had to be arranged from Wanganui.

In March 1945, a Pātea man was fined for allowing a cow to stray into the station yard. He explained to the court that he had been away at work all day while his wife was in hospital, leaving his twelve-year-old son to look after the cow, and that the station yard gates were not always kept shut.

== Decline and closure ==
By late 1960 the original station building had stood unattended for many years, and tenders were called for its sale and removal. The goods shed was removed by October 1977. Passenger services had ceased by October 1955, and the station was formally recommended for closure to all traffic on 30 June 1980, taking effect on 20 July that year. A 1990 survey recorded only a shelter shed and a velocipede hut remaining on site, with the sidings already lifted.

== Today ==
The former station site is now a single track through open farmland, marked by an intermediate board reading "Kakaramea". Following vehicle accidents at the level crossing in 2011 and 2022, the crossing was upgraded from stop signs to active barrier arms and bells in 2025.
