= Corbett Road railway station =

Former railway station in Bell Block, New Zealand

Corbett Road

General information
- Location: 161 Corbett Road; Bell Block; New Plymouth 4312; New Zealand
- Coordinates: 39°02′32.2″S 174°10′14.2″E
- Elevation: 48 metres (157 ft)
- System: New Zealand Government Railways (NZGR); Regional rail
- Line: Marton–New Plymouth line
- Distance: 199.51 kilometres (123.97 mi) from Marton
- Platforms: Single side
- Tracks: 1

Construction
- Structure type: at-grade
- Parking: yes
- Architectural style: Shelter Shed

History
- Opened: 14 October 1875; 151 years ago
- Closed: 22 February 1963; 63 years ago
Location
Notes
- Previous Station: Sentry Hill Station; Next Station: Bell Block Station

Corbett Road railway station was a small rural flag station on the Marton–New Plymouth line in Taranaki, New Zealand. It opened in 1875, serving the region’s first railway line between New Plymouth and Waitara. Later, it became a flag-stop on the main line extending south towards Wanganui.

The station had minimal facilities, primarily serving local dairy and crop farmers. It was closed in 1963.

== History ==
The railway line through Corbett Road has its origins in Taranaki’s first railway, the New Plymouth to Waitara line, which opened on 14 October 1875. At that time, the surrounding district was recovering from the Taranaki Wars of the 1860s, with land sales in the area having been a catalyst for the conflicts.

In early timetables, Corbett Road was listed as one of several "wayside" stopping places where trains would halt on request. Initially, the station had no platform or building, and trains would stop at the road crossing if flagged by passengers or for goods loading. A simple wooden passenger platform was installed by 1898, located on the right-hand side of the single track, providing a safer boarding area from the road. By 1900, a shelter shed had been erected on the platform to provide rudimentary shelter for passengers.

The station lacked dedicated freight facilities. In 1927, a request for a freight siding was made but declined, as Bell Block station had been equipped with full freight facilities.

In 1933, the Bell Block Aerodrome opened adjacent to the station, with one runway ending just east of the station building. However, there was no direct access between the two, resulting in minimal railway traffic related to the aerodrome.

By 1961, the station was described as a "small lean-to building and platform overgrown with weeds," and tenders were called for the removal of the building. The station was officially closed on 22 February 1963.

== Notable Events ==
With the growth in vehicle traffic, on June 1, 1929, new national road regulations led to changes in railway crossing signage. Drivers were only required to slow to 15 mph while approaching crossings rather than coming to a complete stop. Signage at these crossings was altered from "Stop. Look Out for the Engine" to read "Railway. Look Out".

However, a list of crossings considered more dangerous was created, which included Corbett Road. At these stops, yellow octagonal signs with the words "compulsory stop' were erected. A fine of £10 was levied on anyone who failed to stop.

A meat wagon on the Auckland–New Plymouth express derailed about a mile before Corbett Road station. There were no injuries, but the incident delayed the morning express and other trains. A breakdown gang re-railed the wagon, and schoolchildren from Waitara had to be bused when their morning train was cancelled due to the blocked line.

To better serve military personnel at the nearby RNZAF Bell Block station during World War II, New Plymouth’s stationmaster announced that from 10 January 1943 all express trains and railcars would make request stops at Corbett Road. Schedules were adjusted by a few minutes (e.g. the morning Wellington express left New Plymouth three minutes earlier) to accommodate the flag stop without delaying the timetable. Previously, airmen posted at Bell Block had to travel into New Plymouth to catch long-distance trains.

In a well-publicised incident, a six-year-old girl was accidentally left behind in New Plymouth when the northbound Auckland express departed with her grandmother onboard. The train was halted at Lepperton and the panicked grandmother alighted at Corbett Road station. A taxi carrying the child gave chase and reunited them at Corbett Road, but they missed the train’s restart. Not giving up, the taxi raced ahead to Tariki, where railway staff flagged down the express. The grandmother and child were safely put aboard, resuming their journey to Auckland.

The morning “mail train” from New Plymouth broke an axle on its tender between Bell Block and Corbett Road. The train continued a short distance, but at Lepperton the damaged tender jammed a set of points, blocking the main line. Passengers were taken by bus to their destination while the line was cleared.

== Kaipakopako Station ==
Kaipakopako was located near the site of a pā (fortified village) associated with Te Waitere Kātātore, a chief of the Puketapu hapū of Te Ātiawa. During the construction of the railway, stations were typically placed near road crossings. Kaipakopako was situated east of the Ninia Road level crossing, near its intersection with Kaipakopako Road.

The station had a brief operational period. In April 1885, its closure was recommended, and it was officially closed on Sunday, May 24, 1885, by order of T.F. Rotherham, the District Manager for the railways. It was only the second railway station to close in Taranaki, after Aikenhead Station.

== Today ==
The Corbett Road and Kaipakopako station sites no longer show visible signs of their former railway use. Although the track remains part of the Marton–New Plymouth Line, which is still active for freight services operated by KiwiRail, trains now pass through the area without stopping.
