= New Plymouth Night Express =

Former passenger train service in New Zealand

The New Plymouth Night Express was a passenger express train operated by the New Zealand Railways Department (NZR) that ran between Auckland and New Plymouth between 1933 until 1956. The New Plymouth Night Express should not be confused with the New Plymouth Express that operated between New Plymouth and Wellington.

== Introduction ==
In 1933, the Stratford–Okahukura Line was completed, providing a rail link through northern Taranaki between the Marton - New Plymouth Line and the North Island Main Trunk Railway. On 4 September 1933, the new line's ownership was handed over to NZR from the New Zealand Ministry of Works, and early that morning, the first passenger service was operated. This inaugural service left Auckland at 7 pm on 3 September 1933 attached to the Night Limited, and it consisted of one first class carriage, one second class carriage, a sleeping car, and a guard's van. In Taumarunui, these carriages were detached from the Night Limited, as it was to continue to Wellington, and ran as a separate train to New Plymouth, departing Taumarunui at 12:45 am and arriving in New Plymouth just after 6 am. The return working left New Plymouth at 7:10 pm, connected with the Night Limited in Taumarunui, and was conveyed back to Auckland by the Limited for a 7:10 am arrival.

== Operation ==
Joint running with the Night Limited for the Taumarunui-Auckland leg was the pattern for the 1930s, with the service provided thrice weekly on Mondays, Wednesdays, and Fridays. A^{B} class steam locomotives were typical motive power at this stage, and a train from Hāwera connected with the Express in Stratford. At holiday times, the New Plymouth Night Express was run separately from the Night Limited due to large volumes of passengers, and as this service ran directly between New Plymouth and Auckland, it did not pass through Taumarunui, which is seven miles to the south of the junction in Okahukura; accordingly, a connecting train ran between Taumarunui and Okahukura.

In 1940, the independent service began operating thrice weekly year-round. It departed Auckland at 7:50 pm on Sundays, Tuesdays, and Thursdays, made refreshment stops in Frankton and Taumarunui as NZR did not operate dining cars at this point in history, and arrived in New Plymouth at 7:19 am the next morning. The opposite working left New Plymouth at 7:08 pm on Mondays, Wednesdays, and Fridays, made the same refreshment stops, and arrived in Auckland at 6:30 am the next morning. Operating through to Taumarunui removed the need for a connecting train between Taumarunui and Okahukura, but it did mean the front of the train at the start of the journey became the back for the second leg and the seats were reversed. Sleeping car facilities were removed in 1944 due to restrictions caused by World War II, and by 1950, the train ran only twice weekly due to coal shortages. At this stage, J class locomotives had become the primary motive power and the train typically comprised two first class carriages, three second class carriages, and a guard's van.

== Replacement by railcars ==
The actual New Plymouth Night Express ceased to operate in 1956. RM class 88 seater railcars had recently been introduced by NZR, and they provided a more economical service and replaced the carriage train. They offered a more regular daily service on a quicker timetable but continued the Express's pattern of operating at night. The southbound service arrived in New Plymouth at 11:23 pm and departed for Auckland at 2:34 am. There was some speculation that the service was originally intended to only operate between Auckland and Taumarunui, and its late running to New Plymouth was a result of this run being extended, but as it turned out, this section of the run was cancelled in 1971, and the railcars operated solely between New Plymouth and Taumarunui. Soon after this change, the service was altered to a daytime run in December 1973, with a departure from New Plymouth at 8:30 am and the return service leaving Taumarunui at 3:10 pm.

== Return and demise of carriage trains ==
The new daytime service proved more popular with the local population and allowed mixed trains to cease to operate along the route from 1 December 1975. The 88 seater railcars were mechanically deteriorating by this stage and last operated on 11 February 1978, but unlike most other provincial railcar services, the New Plymouth-Taumarunui run was not outright cancelled. There was sufficient traffic to justify a replacement carriage train, and its consist initially comprised carriages made from de-motorised 88 seater railcars; these carriages were known as Grassgrubs in New Zealand railfan jargon due to their paint scheme. The railcars were not designed to be hauled as carriages and were soon replaced by ordinary passenger carriages. Around this time, roads through the isolated area served by the train were improved, and as locals turned to the private car in greater numbers, NZR was no longer prepared to incur losses from the service. It last operated on 21 January 1983.
