= Manutahi =

- Interactive map of Manutahi
- Coordinates: 39°39′38″S 174°23′47″E
- Country: New Zealand
- Region: Taranaki
- District: South Taranaki District
- Ward: Pātea General Ward; Te Tai Tonga Māori Ward
- Community: Pātea Community
- Electorates: Whanganui; Te Tai Hauāuru (Māori)

Government
  - Territorial Authority: South Taranaki District Council
  - Regional council: Taranaki Regional Council
  - Mayor of South Taranaki: Phil Nixon
  - Whanganui MP: Carl Bates
  - Te Tai Hauāuru MP: Debbie Ngarewa-Packer

Area
  - Total: 24.45 km^{2} (9.44 sq mi)

Population (2023 census)
  - Total: 144
  - Density: 5.89/km^{2} (15.3/sq mi)

Manutahi is a small community in south Taranaki, New Zealand, situated on SH3 about halfway between the towns of Hāwera and Pātea. The area was a significant site in the New Zealand Wars of the 1860s. The major industries in Manutahi today are dairy farming, and oil and gas production.

The local Manutahi Marae and its Taumaha meeting house are affiliated with the Ngāti Tākou hapū of Te Pakakohi.

== Demographics ==
Manutahi locality covers 24.45 km^{2} (9.44 sq mi). The locality is part of the larger Manutahi-Waitōtora statistical area.

Historical population
| Year | Pop. | ±% p.a. |
|---|---|---|
| 2006 | 120 | — |
| 2013 | 147 | +2.94% |
| 2018 | 135 | −1.69% |
| 2023 | 144 | +1.30% |

Manutahi had a population of 144 in the 2023 New Zealand census, an increase of 9 people (6.7%) since the 2018 census, and a decrease of 3 people (−2.0%) since the 2013 census. There were 81 males and 66 females in 54 dwellings. The median age was 35.0 years (compared with 38.1 years nationally). There were 45 people (31.2%) aged under 15 years, 18 (12.5%) aged 15 to 29, 63 (43.8%) aged 30 to 64, and 18 (12.5%) aged 65 or older.

People could identify as more than one ethnicity. The results were 87.5% European (Pākehā), 10.4% Māori, and 6.2% Asian. English was spoken by 97.9%, Māori by 2.1%, and other languages by 8.3%. No language could be spoken by 2.1% (e.g. too young to talk). The percentage of people born overseas was 8.3, compared with 28.8% nationally.

Religious affiliations were 41.7% Christian, and 2.1% Buddhist. People who answered that they had no religion were 52.1%, and 4.2% of people did not answer the census question.

Of those at least 15 years old, 18 (18.2%) people had a bachelor's or higher degree, 60 (60.6%) had a post-high school certificate or diploma, and 27 (27.3%) people exclusively held high school qualifications. The median income was $46,300, compared with $41,500 nationally. 9 people (9.1%) earned over $100,000 compared to 12.1% nationally. The employment status of those at least 15 was 60 (60.6%) full-time and 15 (15.2%) part-time.

== Education ==
Manutahi School opened in 1876 and closed in 1996.

== Transport ==
South Road, part of State Highway 3, travels through Manutahi running west towards Mokoia and Hāwera and east towards Kakaramea and Pātea. Southlink buses connect Manutahi to those towns twice a week.

Manutahi railway station was located approximately 2.3 kilometres (1.4 mi) away by road on the Marton-New Plymouth line. It closed in 1982 but a passing loop remains.
