= Pātea railway station =

Railway station in New Zealand

- Postcard view of the Patea Railway Station and Wharves in 1909

General information
- Other names: Carlyle railway station
- Location: Portland Quay, Patea; New Zealand
- Coordinates: 39°45′33″S 174°29′9″E
- Elevation: 18 m (59 ft)
- System: New Zealand Government Railways (NZGR); Regional rail
- Line: Marton–New Plymouth line
- Distance: 103.83 km (64.51 mi) from Marton

Construction
- Structure type: At-grade
- Parking: No

History
- Opened: 28 August 1883; 143 years ago
- Closed: 31 May 1976; 50 years ago (passengers); 22 September 1986; 40 years ago (freight)
- Rebuilt: 1960
- Former names: Carlyle (until 1881)
Location
Notes
- Previous station: Rangikura Station; Next station: Pariroa Pa Station

Patea railway station (originally Carlyle railway station) was a railway station on the Marton–New Plymouth line, serving the town of Patea in the Taranaki district of New Zealand. It opened on 28 August 1883 with the extension of the railway from Waverley to Manutahi, and served as a station for both passenger and freight traffic, including substantial trade generated by the town's freezing works and river port, until its closure to passengers in 1976.

== History ==
=== Origins and construction ===
Patea was originally known as Carlyle, and the earliest railway works in the district are recorded under that name. A contract for the Carlyle station was let to Downes, Proctor & Co. for £16,928 13s 0d, with the general arrangement of the station yard approved in 1880. The Patea Harbour Board sought a crossing to its reserves on the river side of the line near the station, and an interim final certificate for the Carlyle station contract was issued in November 1881.

Preparatory survey and contract work for the line north from Waverley was reported in the Patea Mail as early as November 1881. By January 1883 the line had been laid as far as Ball Road, on the Manutahi side of Patea. The approaching opening was anticipated in the press, and the 17 mi (27 km) section from Waverley to Manutahi — which passed through Patea — duly opened on 28 August 1883, making Patea a station on the temporary railhead from Wanganui. A contract for the passenger station building was let to J. A. Johnston for £1,991, and completed on 23 August 1883, immediately ahead of the opening. A separate contract for the goods shed had been signed in 1881, and an engine shed contract was signed and completed later the same year.

The final gap in the line, between Manutahi and Hāwera, was completed on 23 March 1885, giving Patea a continuous through connection between Wellington and New Plymouth.

=== Station buildings and yard ===
Patea was built and maintained as a substantial "special station" for most of its life, reflecting the size of the town and its port trade. A contemporary description of the Patea and Manutahi stations appeared in the Patea Mail in October 1882. Rail Heritage Trust records from the 1890s and 1900s describe an accommodation building of "special station" grade, with a passenger platform on the right-hand side, a cart approach to the platform, a goods shed measuring 100 ft by 42 ft (30 m by 13 m), a loading bank, cattle and sheep yards, a crane, water service, a stationmaster's house and urinals.

Yard capacity in this period comprised several loops and backshunts able to hold, in total, well over 100 wagons, including dedicated loops serving the wharf. The original complex also included an engine shed, coal shed and locomotive water supply. The water supply consisted of a storage reservoir in the cliff above the station, fed by a small spring, which supplied water for both locomotives and station purposes.

In 1898–99 the original Pātea Viaduct was superseded by a deviation of the main line, formed largely in cutting and embankment, with a short bridge constructed for the waterway. As part of the same programme of works, the engine shed at Pātea was removed and transferred to Hāwera.

The stationmaster's house was extended several times, including the addition of a verandah in 1884 and three further bedrooms in 1898, and was damaged by fire in April 1912. Semaphore signals were provided at each end of the yard from 1899, and the platform was lengthened the same year. A weighbridge had been added by 1911.

Access to the station was a recurring concern for the Railways Department: the steps at the station entrance were ordered replaced by a ramp in 1940, following representations reported in the Taranaki Daily News, and a cycle shed was built the same year to shelter schoolchildren's bicycles.

==== Refreshment Rooms ====
Refreshment rooms were established at the station by at least 1887, when railway property records show the rooms leased to Helen Dempsey from 21 March at an annual rent of £20 2s 6d. The Railways Department considered closing it in 1893 and later approved its reopening with a liquor licence in 1894. In 1898 the rooms returned an annual rent of £47, together with a £25 liquor-licence fee. After continuing for many years under private lessees, the Pātea refreshment rooms were taken over for direct operation by the Railways Department's Refreshment Branch during 1925–26, when additions and improvements were also carried out.

The refreshment room was the target of burglaries reported in the Taranaki Daily News in 1927 and the Hawera Star in 1933.

==== Replacement Station ====
In 1959 construction began on a new, smaller station building measuring 50 ft by 24 ft (later completed at 55 ft by 24 ft with an 11 ft verandah), built about 50 yards north of the 1882 building. The new building opened in June 1960, painted in a maroon, green, grey and yellow colour scheme. The new building was smaller than its predecessor, with no refreshment room. Tenders were called that November for the sale and removal of the old station building. A photograph of the new station appeared in The Press in December 1963.

=== Wharf and freight traffic ===
Patea's importance as a station was closely tied to its river port and the freezing works on the east bank of the Patea River. The Railway Wharf opened on the eastern bank in 1883, alongside the railway, two years after the Town Wharf opened on the opposite bank. Pātea subsequently became an important coastal outlet for dairy produce; at its peak, vessels from the port accounted for more than half of Wellington's dairy exports. Refrigerated produce was carried by coastal steamers to Wellington for transhipment, while the railway, wharves, freezing works and later cool stores formed a closely connected industrial complex.

Additional loops served the wharf directly, and dedicated backshunts were later provided for the Refrigerating Company. The Railways Department carried out repairs to the wharf across the early 1900s and undertook further repair and enlargement of the goods shed at the wharf in 1896. A private siding to a brickyard was requested by J. Smith in 1883, and further private siding applications were made by W. Oldham in 1895 and 1897. A 4,000-gallon vat was erected at the south end of the yard in 1900, and a coal stage was authorised in 1896.

Freight traffic began to decline in the second half of the twentieth century. The Taranaki Producers' Freezing Works Company closed its cool store at Patea in June 1970. In June 1977 the main-line turnout serving the former Cool Store siding, along with its associated trap points, was removed and the siding converted to a dead end; the same year, the siding alongside the old wharf was found unsafe for DA and DX class locomotives and locomotive limit boards were erected.

=== Closure and later use ===
Patea closed to passenger traffic on 31 May 1976, and freight traffic on 22 September 1986. The railway through the former station remains operational. As of 2026, KiwiRail lists Pātea at 103.83 km on the Marton–New Plymouth Line as a warrant station under Track Warrant Control, with a crossing loop providing 638 m of standing room.
