= NZR M class =

NZR M Class
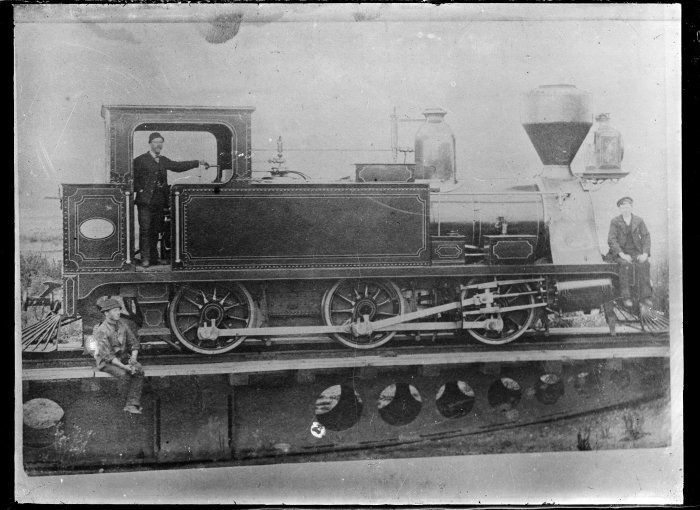
- Image courtesy of A P Godber Collection, Alexander Turnbull Library
Type and origin
- Power type: Steam
- Builder: Hunslet
- Build date: 1875
- Total produced: 4
- Rebuilder: NZR
- Rebuild date: 1888-1890
Specifications
- Configuration
  - Whyte: 0-6-0T
- Driver dia.: 42.25 in (1.073 m)
- Loco weight: 27.7 long tons (28.1 tonnes; 31.0 short tons)
- Firebox
  - Grate area: 8.6 sq ft (0.80 m^{2})
- Boiler pressure: 130 lbf/in^{2} (896 kPa)
- Heating surface: 583 sq ft (54.2 m^{2})
- Cylinders: Two, outside
- Cylinder size: 13 in × 20 in (330 mm × 508 mm)
Performance figures
- Tractive effort: 7,200 lbf (32.03 kN)
Career
- First run: 1875

The NZR M class were a series of four tank engines built in England for the Otago railways Bluff to Winton section. They were acquired by NZR in the late 1870s and rebuilt in the late 1880s. As rebuilt they were not very successful and were used in shunting duties until retirement in the 1920s.

They were rather ineffectual engines derisively called the Pullets by engine men. They were used on the Napier Express at the turn of the century; either in pairs or with a Baldwin N class when the duo was called a 'en and chicken.
