= Alton, New Zealand =

Rural community in Taranaki, North Island

Alton
- Interactive map of Alton
- Coordinates: 39°39′55″S 174°26′47″E
- Country: New Zealand
- Region: Taranaki
- District: South Taranaki District
- Ward: Pātea General Ward; Te Tai Tonga Māori Ward
- Community: Pātea Community
- Electorates: Whanganui; Te Tai Hauāuru (Māori)

Government
  - Territorial Authority: South Taranaki District Council
  - Regional council: Taranaki Regional Council
  - Mayor of South Taranaki: Phil Nixon
  - Whanganui MP: Carl Bates
  - Te Tai Hauāuru MP: Debbie Ngarewa-Packer

Area
  - Total: 21.99 km^{2} (8.49 sq mi)

Population (2023 census)
  - Total: 111
  - Density: 5.05/km^{2} (13.1/sq mi)

Alton is a small rural community in south Taranaki, in the western North Island of New Zealand. It is located between the towns of Hāwera and Pātea.

== History ==
It was founded as Woodville in 1876. When a post office opened about 1887, the name was changed to avoid confusion with Woodville. The name Alton was proposed by James Gibbs from his home town in England.

Alton School opened in 1881 and closed in 1995. A war memorial on the school grounds was moved next to Alton Coronation Hall in 2013.

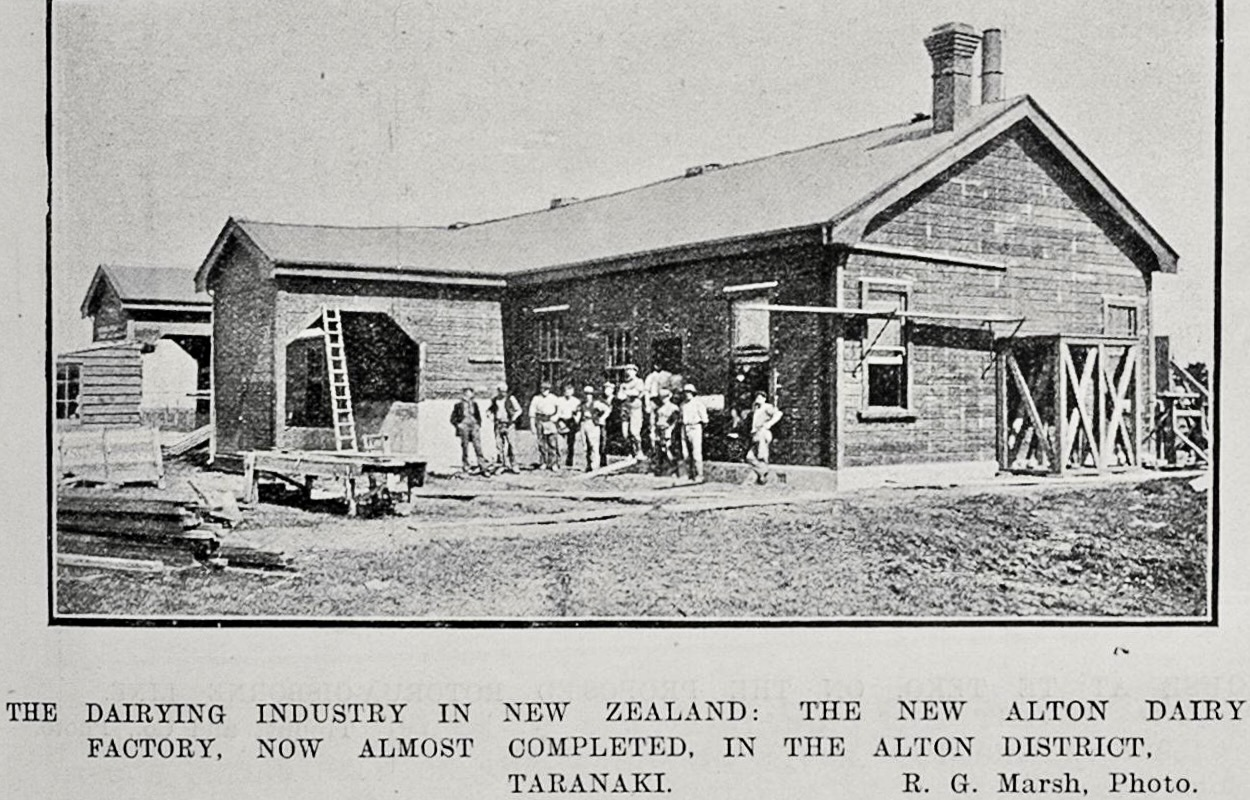
Alton dairy in 1909

Alton Co-operative Dairy Company was established in 1909. The factory was rebuilt after a fire in 1957. It merged with Kiwi Co-operative Dairies in Hāwera in 1984. The factory was sold to Alton Amateur Westling Club (founded 1946).

Alton Coronation Hall was built in 1911. As of 2022, it remained in frequent use.

A small Anglican church was built in 1936. It was sold in poor condition for $1 in 2016 and subsequently restored.

Alton lost its post office when Postmaster-General, Richard Prebble, closed or reduced 580 offices from 5 February 1988.

Alton Hotel closed in 2011.

== Demographics ==
Alton locality covers 21.99 km^{2} (8.49 sq mi). The locality is part of the larger Manutahi-Waitōtora statistical area.

Historical population
| Year | Pop. | ±% p.a. |
|---|---|---|
| 2006 | 111 | — |
| 2013 | 132 | +2.51% |
| 2018 | 102 | −5.03% |
| 2023 | 111 | +1.71% |

Alton had a population of 111 in the 2023 New Zealand census, an increase of 9 people (8.8%) since the 2018 census, and a decrease of 21 people (−15.9%) since the 2013 census. There were 57 males and 54 females in 45 dwellings. The median age was 36.7 years (compared with 38.1 years nationally). There were 27 people (24.3%) aged under 15 years, 15 (13.5%) aged 15 to 29, 51 (45.9%) aged 30 to 64, and 15 (13.5%) aged 65 or older.

People could identify as more than one ethnicity. The results were 86.5% European (Pākehā), 5.4% Māori, and 13.5% Asian. English was spoken by 97.3%, Māori by 2.7%, and other languages by 8.1%. No language could be spoken by 2.7% (e.g. too young to talk). The percentage of people born overseas was 18.9, compared with 28.8% nationally.

Religious affiliations were 54.1% Christian, and 5.4% Buddhist. People who answered that they had no religion were 37.8%, and 5.4% of people did not answer the census question.

Of those at least 15 years old, 15 (17.9%) people had a bachelor's or higher degree, 48 (57.1%) had a post-high school certificate or diploma, and 24 (28.6%) people exclusively held high school qualifications. The median income was $52,200, compared with $41,500 nationally. 12 people (14.3%) earned over $100,000 compared to 12.1% nationally. The employment status of those at least 15 was 54 (64.3%) full-time, 12 (14.3%) part-time, and 3 (3.6%) unemployed.
