= Taranaki Flyer =

Train in New Zealand

The Taranaki Flyer was the name given to a passenger train that was operated by the New Zealand Railways Department between Whanganui and New Plymouth from 1926 to 7 February 1959.

== Introduction ==
The primary passenger service on the Marton–New Plymouth Line was the New Plymouth Express between Wellington and New Plymouth. It was augmented by three slower mixed trains that ran south from New Plymouth daily. In 1926, patronage was sufficiently high to justify replacing one of the mixed trains with a dedicated passenger service between New Plymouth and Whanganui. This train came to be known as the Taranaki Flyer.

== Operation ==
For most of its life, the Taranaki Flyer consisted of a steam locomotive, four passenger carriages and a guards van. When introduced, it took approximately 4.5 hours to complete its journey. The train's running speed was faster than the express, but being a local service, it stopped at a greater number of stations and hence the total journey times were similar. A 1936 newspaper article criticised the line's average running speed of just over 24 miles per hour—no doubt slowed by stops at minor stations such as Corbett Road or Moumahaki.

On 31 October 1955, the carriage trains were replaced by more economical railcars. The railcars were of the Standard and 88 seater types of the RM class. During the railcar period, the northbound train was no. 524 and the southbound train was no. 525.

== Demise ==
During the 1950s, the effect of commercial airlines and private cars started to reduce patronage on New Zealand's passenger trains significantly. Although the introduction of railcars prolonged the life of many other provincial services in New Zealand, it was not successful for the Taranaki Flyer. On 7 February 1959, the service ran for the last time. The final train no. 524 was handled by an 88-seater, RM 116, and a Standard railcar ran train no. 525, RM 30 Aotea.

== A^{B} 745 Taranaki Flyer Project ==
There is also a locomotive that has been nicknamed the Taranaki Flyer, A^{B} class no.745. This locomotive, made in 1922 by the North British Locomotive Company, is currently under restoration by the Rimutaka Incline Railway Heritage Trust. It derailed on 16 July 1956 as a result of a washout near Hāwera while hauling a freight train from Whanganui to New Plymouth. Both crew survived, but the locomotive was too expensive to recover and was buried in situ, with the repaired railway embankment built directly over it. The engine lay undisturbed until November 2001, and in 2002 it was salvaged minus tender, which was in poor condition, and taken to Waitara. In 2007, the Taranaki Flyer Society formed to restore the locomotive, and it was transported to the old railway goods shed at Stratford. The Society, however, became low on funds and lost its lease on the shed. It offered the locomotive to other preservation groups and accepted an offer from the Rimutaka Incline Railway Heritage Trust. The locomotive has been based at that group's workshops in Maymorn since October 2013. It is currently under restoration, with the long-term objective of returning it to operation.
