= Marton–New Plymouth line =

Railway line in New Zealand

Marton-New Plymouth Line
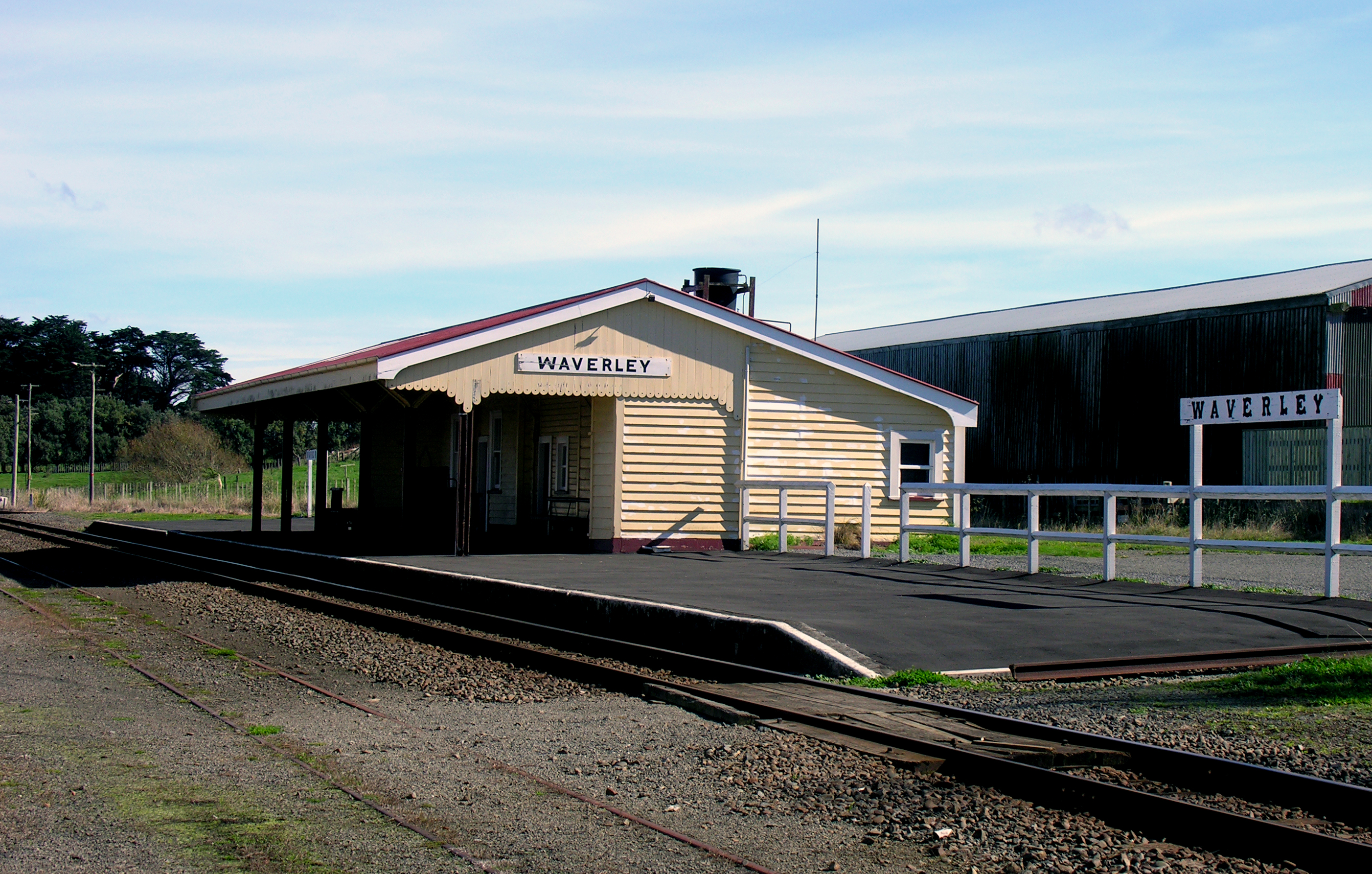
- Waverley Railway Station 22 April 2006

Overview
- Other name(s): Foxton and Wanganui Railway
- Status: Active
- Owner: KiwiRail
- Locale: Taranaki and Manawatū–Whanganui, New Zealand
- Termini: Marton; New Plymouth (Port Taranaki)
- Connecting lines: North Island Main Trunk; Wanganui Branch; Kapuni Branch; Stratford–Okahukura line Waitara Branch

Service
- Type: Heavy Rail
- System: New Zealand Government Railways (NZGR)
- Operator: KiwiRail

History
- Work began: 1873
- Opened: 23 March 1885
- Final passenger service (entire line): 30 July 1977
- Final passenger service (New Plymouth): 21 January 1983

Technical
- Line length: 208.93 km (129.82 mi)
- Number of tracks: Single
- Character: Rural, at-grade
- Track gauge: 3 ft 6 in (1,067 mm)

Map

The Marton–New Plymouth line (MNPL) is a secondary railway in the North Island of New Zealand, linking the Taranaki and Manawatū-Whanganui regions. It diverges from the North Island Main Trunk (NIMT) at Marton and follows the South Taranaki Bight along the west coast before turning inland to meet the Stratford–Okahukura Line (SOL) at Stratford, continuing on to New Plymouth.

Construction of the line was completed in 1885. With the completion of the SOL in 1933, the combined route provided an alternative western connection to the NIMT—though this role diminished when the SOL was mothballed in 2010. In its early years, the MNPL hosted the New Plymouth Express, the North Island’s first regional express service. Following the withdrawal of passenger services in 1977, the line has been used exclusively for freight.

== Construction ==
Construction of the line commenced in the mid-1870s from both the southern and northern ends. The line was completed when the two ends met between Hāwera and Manutahi in 1885.

=== Southern end: Marton–Manutahi ===
The southern portion of the line was conceived as part of the Foxton and Wanganui Railway, which was intended to link the two ports of Foxton and Wanganui with hinterland settlements such as Marton and New Plymouth, and form the first portion of a trunk route between Wellington and Taranaki. A tramway had originally been considered for the Rangitikei District, but this plan was abandoned in 1872 and surveys for a railway were undertaken in 1873. Contracts were awarded the next year for construction, but mass sickness caused work to slow in 1875 and the collapse of a girder during the construction of a bridge over the Whanganui River in 1876 compounded the delays.

The line from Wanganui to Aramoho opened on 21 January 1878; this became the Wanganui Branch, with Aramoho the junction station on the MNPL. The first section of what became the MNPL opened on 17 May 1877, with a rugged line through the valleys of the Whangaehu River and Turakina River to Turakina. The route had been chosen due to its cheapness to construct, but its alignment and torturous grades attracted criticism from the day it opened. The next section, through easier terrain, opened to Marton on 4 February 1878. The remainder of the route of the Foxton and Wanganui Railway became the NIMT from Marton through Palmerston North to Longburn and the Foxton Branch from Longburn to Foxton.

With the completion of the line south of Wanganui, attention was focused on the line to the north. The section from Aramoho to Kai Iwi, including the Westmere Bank, opened on 28 June 1879. The Westmere Bank's grade is 1 in 35 (with a peak grade of 1 in 28) and it remains the line's ruling gradient. From Kai Iwi, Waitotara was reached on 20 September 1880, Waverley on 23 March 1881, and Manutahi via Pātea on 28 August 1883. From this point, construction proceeded to complete the small gap between the southern and northern sections.

=== Northern end: New Plymouth–Manutahi ===
Like the southern end, the first portion of the northern section was built as part of a different railway. Construction of what became the Waitara Branch began on 21 August 1873, with the line finished on 14 October 1875. The next year, construction began on the MNPL south from Sentry Hill after John Brogden and Sons were awarded the contract for the first section in January. Until 1908, the Waitara line was the through route to New Plymouth with the MNPL branching at Sentry Hill, but in that year the junction was moved slightly south to Lepperton and the MNPL became the through route. The first portion of the line south opened on 30 November 1877 to Inglewood, followed by an extension to Stratford on 17 December 1879.

Short stages of the line were opened over the next two years, including to Eltham on 7 February 1881. On 1 August 1881 the first train from New Plymouth reached Hawera, carrying 300 passengers, although the line was not handed over to the Railways Department from the Public Works Department until 20 October 1881. The final section of approximately 16 kilometres from Hawera to Manutahi passed through rugged country and required viaducts over the Tangahoe and Manawapou Rivers. Due to wet weather, surveying took longer than expected, and in 1882, contracts had still not been let despite the imminent completion of the southern portion to Manutahi. The Wellington Chamber of Commerce applied pressure on the Public Works Department to prioritise the section's approval, fearing that its construction was in jeopardy and any failure to link the two railheads would be considerably detrimental to both the profitability of the existing railway network and to the wider economy. The final section was subsequently granted approval and it was not until 23 March 1885 that construction was finished and the through line from Marton to New Plymouth was open for revenue service.

Manawapou viaduct was swept away by a flood on 2 March 1966. A 169 ft (52 m) temporary trestle viaduct replaced it on 6 April. A permanent viaduct opened in November 1969.

=== Turakina deviation ===
The criticism of the difficult Turakina route south from Wanganui voiced at the opening of the line progressively increased over the years. By the mid-1930s it had become a severe bottleneck and the Railways Department decided to construct a deviation. In 1937 construction began on a new 16-km route to replace 23 km of the original route. It included significant tunnelling work and had a ruling gradient of 1 in 70 rather than 1 in 35. The old route also had "severe" curves of 5 chain (100m) radius. Due to the project's importance, work continued throughout World War II, with only a brief pause in 1942 at the height of fears of a Japanese invasion. Defects with the tunnels caused delays in completion, and the deviation opened on 7 December 1947. On the old route, A^{B} class steam locomotives were capable of hauling 175 tons; on the new deviation they could handle up to 420 tons. The formation of the old route remains for much of its length, and is used as O'Leary Road near Fordell; a couple of platform edges at old station sites also remain.

=== Kai Iwi deviation ===
By the start of the 21st century the narrow loading gauge in the 70-m long No.4 tunnel south of Kai Iwi was posing limitations on the growth of freight traffic with containers no greater than 2.6 m in height being able to pass through the tunnel. In September 2007 ONTRACK announced plans for a deviation, and in December a contract worth NZ$2.8 million was let to Hurlstone Earth Moving for a 992-m deviation to eliminate the tunnel, with trains now able to carry 2.9 m high cube containers. The deviation also eliminated a time-consuming permanent speed restriction of 15 km/h in the area.

== Operation ==
=== Passenger services ===
Not long after the completion of the Wellington–Manawatu Line by the Wellington and Manawatu Railway Company (WMR) on 3 November 1886, the New Plymouth Express was introduced, jointly operated by the WMR and NZR. Upon its introduction in December, its timetable was the subject of protests. The service stopped at only the larger towns, prompting indignation from residents of smaller towns who felt that the line's wayside traffic was being sacrificed so that through passengers could save an hour's travel time. Local traffic was primarily catered for by slow mixed trains. The Express initially operated twice weekly, with connections to Onehunga in Auckland by steamer. In 1901 the express began operating daily; in 1908, with the incorporation of the WMR into the NZR, the service was run by a single government operator; and from 1909, the steamer connections ceased as direct expresses between Wellington and Auckland began operating on the newly opened NIMT.

In 1926, the Taranaki Flyer passenger train was introduced between Wanganui and New Plymouth, replacing one mixed train. Two additional mixed trains ran south from New Plymouth daily. The opening of the SOL in 1933 saw the introduction of the New Plymouth Night Express between Auckland and New Plymouth, using the MNPL between New Plymouth and Stratford. It ran thrice weekly, with extra trains at peak periods. In 1938, the RM class Standard railcars entered service and they operated an evening service between Wellington and New Plymouth to complement the Express. In a test run, one of these railcars completed the journey in 6.5 hours. Difficulties on the 1 in 35 grades of the original Turakina route and Westmere Bank meant that the railcars had to have different gears installed, reducing their top speed from 120 km/h to 105 km/h.

Increasing competition from road and air services led to a decline in passengers after World War II. The New Plymouth Express and Taranaki Flyer ran for the last time on 31 October 1955 and were replaced by Standard and 88-seater railcars. The New Plymouth Night Express was similarly replaced by 88-seater railcars the next year. The railcar substitute for the Taranaki Flyer ran for the last time on 7 February 1959, but the other services survived into the 1970s. From 1968, the sole services operated by the Standard railcars were those on the MNPL and SOL; they were finally displaced from these services in late 1972.

The 88-seater railcars were replaced by "Blue Streak" refurbished 88-seater railcars, displaced from the NIMT by the introduction of the Silver Fern railcars. The Blue Streaks were introduced to the Wellington to New Plymouth morning service. The evening service, which by then ran solely on Fridays and Sundays, had been the final domain of the Standard railcars, but they too were replaced by the 88-seaters after the last run of a Standard railcar on the morning service on 17 December 1972. The 88-seaters were ageing and plagued by reliability problems, and on 30 July 1977 all passenger trains between Wellington and New Plymouth were cancelled, thus ending passenger service between Marton and Stratford. The railcars replacing the New Plymouth Night Express had ceased to operate the Auckland-Taumarunui section since 1971, and when they were withdrawn after 11 February 1978, a diesel-hauled carriage train was introduced on the New Plymouth to Stratford and Taumarunui run. It ran for the last time on 21 January 1983 and was the last regular passenger train to operate on any part of the MNPL. Since this time, the only passenger services have been excursions.

=== Freight ===
In the early years of the line, freight was primarily local and the railway served as a link between ports and their hinterland. Long-distance freight progressively developed over the course of the 20th century, aided by the decline of coastal shipping and the need to carry freight to ports in other regions.

Freight services using the full length of the line fell as low as a single service each weekday, with services to and from the north routed via the SOL and then the NIMT. Three daily services transported products along the Hāwera–New Plymouth section from the Fonterra factory at Whareroa until Fonterra elected to shift its container traffic to the Ports of Auckland and Tauranga.

Nowadays the line sees two-weekday freight services between Palmerston North (departing 2350 and 0355) and New Plymouth (departing 1530 and 1815) and up to three daily return services between Palmerston North and Whareroa, carrying milk from the Manawatu and Hawkes Bay (via a facility at Oringi and rail from there) to the Fonterra plant and empty milk tankers and containerised products on the return trip through most of the year. Other services include regular services along the Kapuni Branch for urea, and with the opening of an inland port facility in Wanganui in 2010 by Open Dairy a daily service exists to/from Palmerston North via the Wanganui Branch and the reopened Castlecliff Branch.

Passing loops are at Ruatangata (near Turakina), Whanganui, Kai Iwi, Waitotara and Pātea.

The mothballing of the SOL in 2010 now means all northbound freight must transition through Marton.

=== Motive power ===
Steam locomotives were the primary motive power on the MNPL until the early 1960s. Tank locomotives were prevalent until the 1920s. At the start of the 20th century, W^{B} class locomotives were based in Wanganui, W^{A} and W^{F} locomotives from Palmerston North were used on the line, and M and double Fairlie E class locomotives were based in New Plymouth. Tender locomotives only gained precedence in the 1920s with the introduction of the A^{B} class, though W^{F} locomotives continued to assist over the difficult grades out of Aramoho. W^{W} class tanks were also used on the MNPL in this era. After World War II, K and K^{A} locomotives were introduced, the most powerful steam power used on the line. and from the mid-1950s a variety of railcars were introduced for the passenger services.

In the early 1960s D^{A} class diesel locomotives began taking over most freight duties, with steam locomotive workings ceasing in 1966. When introduced in 1972, the D^{X} class were not common on the MNPL largely owing to the need to strengthen bridges to accommodate their weight. As the DA class were phased out in the 1980s, DX class locomotives became frequently used on the line. During the 1990s and early 2000s, the dominant locomotive classes at the time (DC, DFT, DX) operated on the line, usually in multiple and with a DX class unit usually present on all services due to the power advantage they have when climbing the Westmere Bank. The peak season milk trains, for instance, were usually hauled by a pair of DX units owing to the weight of these services. The DL class locomotives have been used on MNPL services following their introduction to the lower North Island in 2011.

With the withdrawal of the DC class and the relocation of the DX and relevant subclasses to the South Island, the DL class is the dominant locomotive class on the MNPL. Motive power on the line regularly consists of pairs of DLs or DFs or mixed with other motive power subject to availability.

== Former stations ==
=== Egmont Road railway station ===
Egmont Road
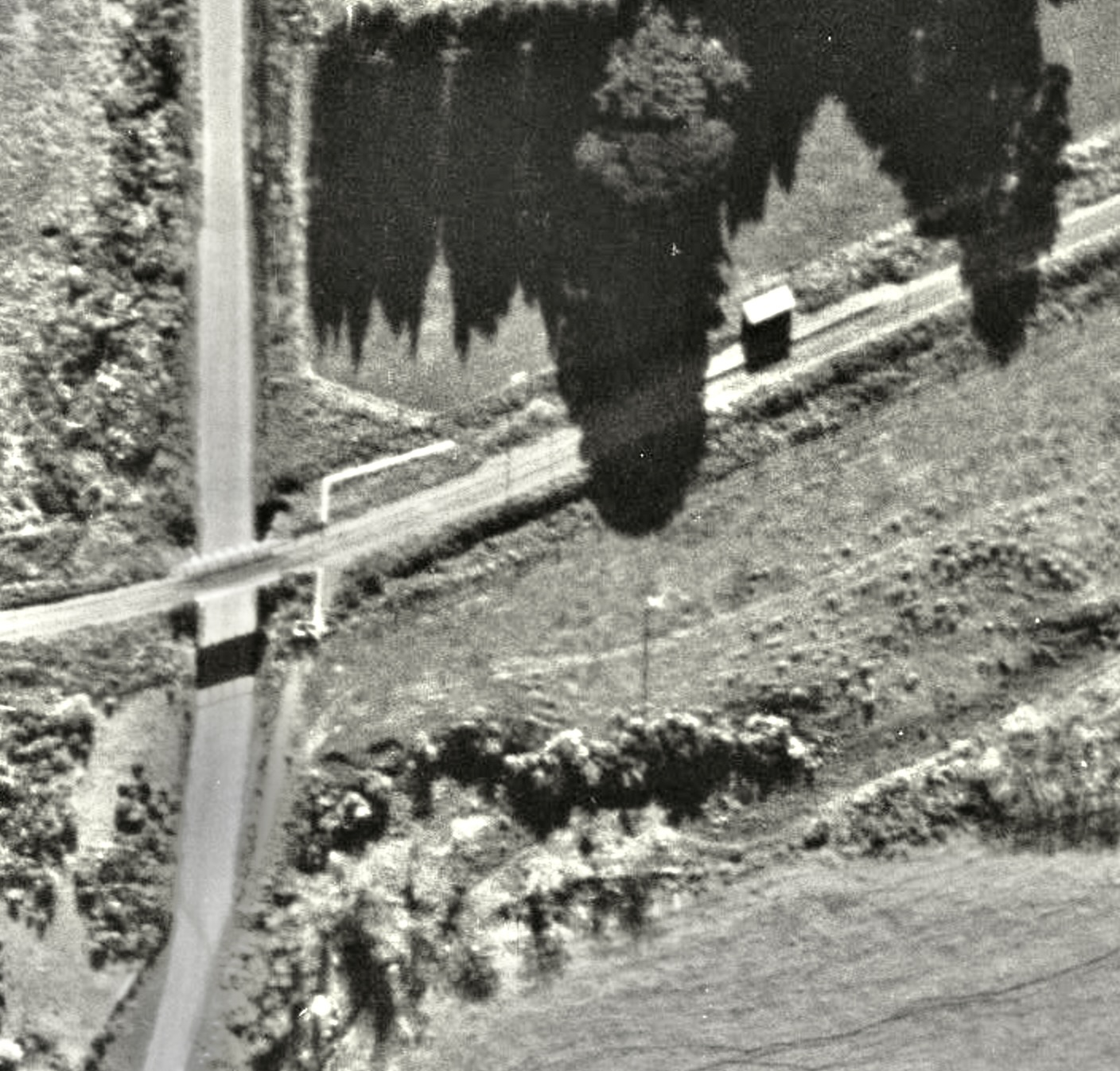
- Egmont Road railway station in 1950

General information
- Location: Egmont Road; Waiwhakaiho; New Plymouth 4372; New Zealand
- Coordinates: 39°02′56.8″S 174°07′42.1″E
- Elevation: 20 metres (66 ft)
- System: New Zealand Government Railways (NZGR); Regional rail
- Line: Marton–New Plymouth line
- Distance: 205.06 kilometres (127.42 mi) from Marton
- Platforms: Single side
- Tracks: 1

Construction
- Structure type: at-grade
- Parking: yes
- Architectural style: Shelter Shed

History
- Opened: 14 October 1875; 150 years ago
- Closed: 10 October 1959; 66 years ago
Location
Notes
- Previous Station: Bell Block Station; Next Station: Smart Road Station

Egmont Road railway station was a small request stop on the line just south of New Plymouth. It opened for passenger traffic on 14 October 1875 and was used as a flag stop with no dedicated freight facilities. Egmont Road station closed on 10 October 1959 when it was dropped as a passenger stop. Today, there is no sign that there was ever a stopping place at Egmont Road. The railway overpass still exists (although rebuilt), and the new Smart Road Freight Terminal begins immediately to the west of the road crossing.

In 1873, surveys for the best route south of New Plymouth favoured an inland alignment, better suited to future extensions. As a result, the railway diverged from the coastal highway, with stopping places established wherever the line crossed key roads. Egmont Road, being one of these intersections, was selected as one of the original stops when the line between New Plymouth and Waitara opened on 14 October 1875.

Like many halts on the newly opened line, Egmont Road was not furnished with any passenger facilities. Trains simply stopped at the level crossing if flagged by waiting passengers. Dissatisfaction with the lack of amenities was voiced early. In 1884, a public meeting of local residents urged the Railways Department to provide a shelter shed and goods siding, but no action was taken.

An 1894 Railways Department report described the stop as follows:

At the present time there is a stopping place at Egmont Road, but no regular station. The gravel alongside the rails is brought up to formation level and except that the step is rather higher this answers the purpose of a platform... The cost of constructing a platform (100 feet long) at this place would amount to about £27 and a shelter shed £13 in addition — £40 total.

Even with such a modest price tag, it was to be another four years before work was complete. By then, Egmont Road finally had a passenger platform and shelter, and could receive passenger traffic, parcels and small lots of consigned goods. Larger amounts of goods could be consigned to Smart Road, which was only 70 chains (1.4 km) away, or Henwood Road, which was 1.25 miles (2.01 km) away.

A notable infrastructure upgrade at Egmont Road came in 1938, not for the station facilities but for the road crossing adjacent to the station. In a joint project between the Railways Department and local authorities, a road underpass for Egmont Road was constructed beneath the railway line. This grade separation greatly improved safety on the busy rural arterial road connecting New Plymouth with communities in the direction of Mount Egmont, occurring three years after a driver had been badly injured when his vehicle was clipped by the passing New Plymouth - Wanganui express. Notably, Egmont Road was one of the first non-highway roads in New Zealand to receive a grade-separated crossing (excluding major deviation works).

By the 1950s, usage of the station had declined to negligible levels. In June 1959, the Railways Department announced plans to close the station, citing extremely low patronage and the absence of originating traffic. Egmont Road station was officially closed to all traffic on 10 October 1959, and the shelter shed was removed shortly afterwards.
