= New Plymouth Express =

Historic rail route in New Zealand

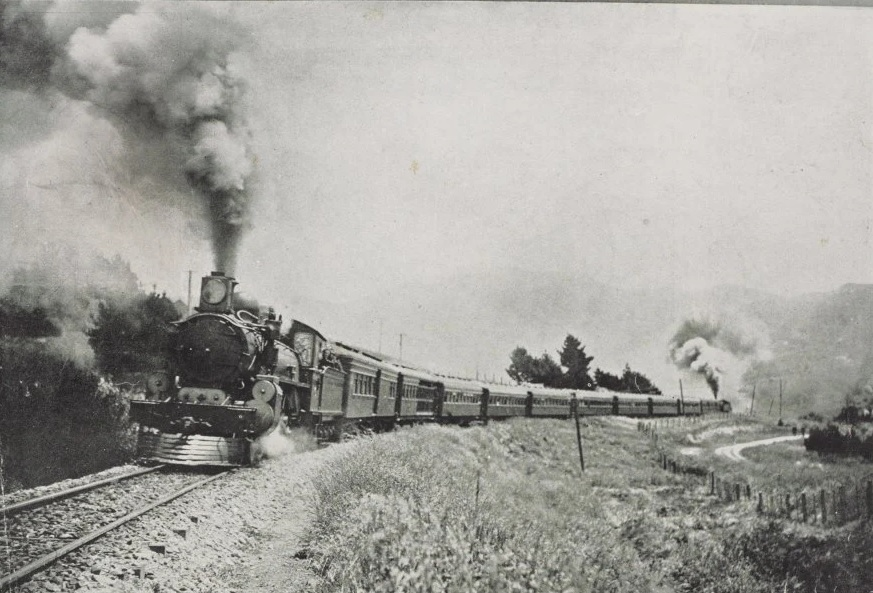
The New Plymouth Express photographed in the 1910s

The New Plymouth Express was a passenger express train operated by the New Zealand Railways Department (NZR) between Wellington and New Plymouth. It ran from 1886 until 1955 and was sometimes known as the New Plymouth Mail due to the Railway Travelling Post Office carriages included in its consist. The Express was notable amongst NZR's provincial expresses as being both the first and, until the commencement of the Gisborne Express in 1942, the longest in distance travelled.

== Introduction ==
On 23 March 1885, NZR opened the railway line between Palmerston North and New Plymouth, with a short branch from Aramoho to Wanganui. A year and a half later, on 3 November 1886, the privately owned Wellington and Manawatu Railway Company opened from Wellington to Longburn, a small village just south of Palmerston North, where it interchanged with NZR. This allowed a direct train to be run between Wellington and New Plymouth; this also formed part of a newer, quicker route to Auckland through connections with steamers between New Plymouth and Auckland's Onehunga Wharf.

== Operation ==
The earliest incarnation of the Express took 14 hours 50 minutes to complete its journey, with a change of trains at Longburn. It began operating from 3 December 1886, initially running twice weekly only. Its northbound run left the WMR's Thorndon station in Wellington at 7am on Tuesdays and Fridays, with NZR's southbound service departing New Plymouth at the same time.

The government and WMR's trains met at Longburn, where passengers had to change. The north and southbound services initially crossed at Whangaehu station, where staff from the travelling post offices would swap. The WMR introduced dining cars not long after it began operating, but NZR trains made refreshment stops at Halcombe and Pātea.

In 1901, NZR and the WMR co-operated to accelerate the train by eliminating the change of trains at Longburn. By this stage, the train ran every day except Sunday, and on four days a week NZR's train ran all the way through to Wellington, while on the other two days the WMR's train ran to New Plymouth. This cut the travelling time down to 12 hours and 50 minutes, and in 1902, NZR eliminated refreshment stops by introducing dining cars of its own. The Express was the second train in New Zealand to be equipped with dining cars, after the South Express, and thus the first in the North Island.

On 7 December 1908 the WMR was acquired by NZR, although the already established practice of through running meant this acquisition had little effect on the Express, except for some changes to the Railway Travelling Post Office and the north- and southbound trains crossing at Marton rather than Longburn. A more dramatic change for the Express was the 1908 opening of the North Island Main Trunk Railway, providing a more direct and quicker route between Wellington and Auckland than the combination of the Express and the steamship to Onehunga. Another change was forced on the train in 1917 by restrictions due to World War I: refreshment stops were re-introduced when the dining cars were withdrawn, never to return.

In 1925, A^{B} class steam locomotives were allocated to the Express, allowing its journey time to be reduced from 12 hours to 9 hours 38 minutes. Although the Express had always been augmented by slower mixed trains, the Taranaki Flyer was introduced in 1926 as an alternative service between Wanganui and New Plymouth, and in April 1938 the RM class Standard railcars began operating an evening service between Wellington and New Plymouth. The railcars eventually took over from the Express, but not for almost two decades. During the 1930s, the Great Depression impacted the Express's loadings, reducing it from nine or ten carriages to only six, but as the economy improved it expanded to eight or nine carriages by the start of World War II, equipped with the most modern carriages. During the War, the Express's carriages were dispersed and it ran with a wide variety of rolling stock; this situation was not rectified until it was re-equipped in 1948. The Turakina Deviation on the Marton - New Plymouth Line opened in 1947, allowing the journey time to be reduced to 9.25 hours.

=== Motive power ===
The WMR typically operated the New Plymouth Express with its premier locomotives: Nos. 16 and 17 hauled the train over the hilly section between Wellington and Paekākāriki, sometimes banked by No. 3 "Jumbo". From Paekākāriki to Longburn, Nos. 19 and 20 took the train across the plains of the Kāpiti Coast and Horowhenua. After the WMR was acquired by NZR, Nos. 19 and 20, now classified as U^{D} class, worked the train through to Marton for a few years before being replaced by A class locomotives.

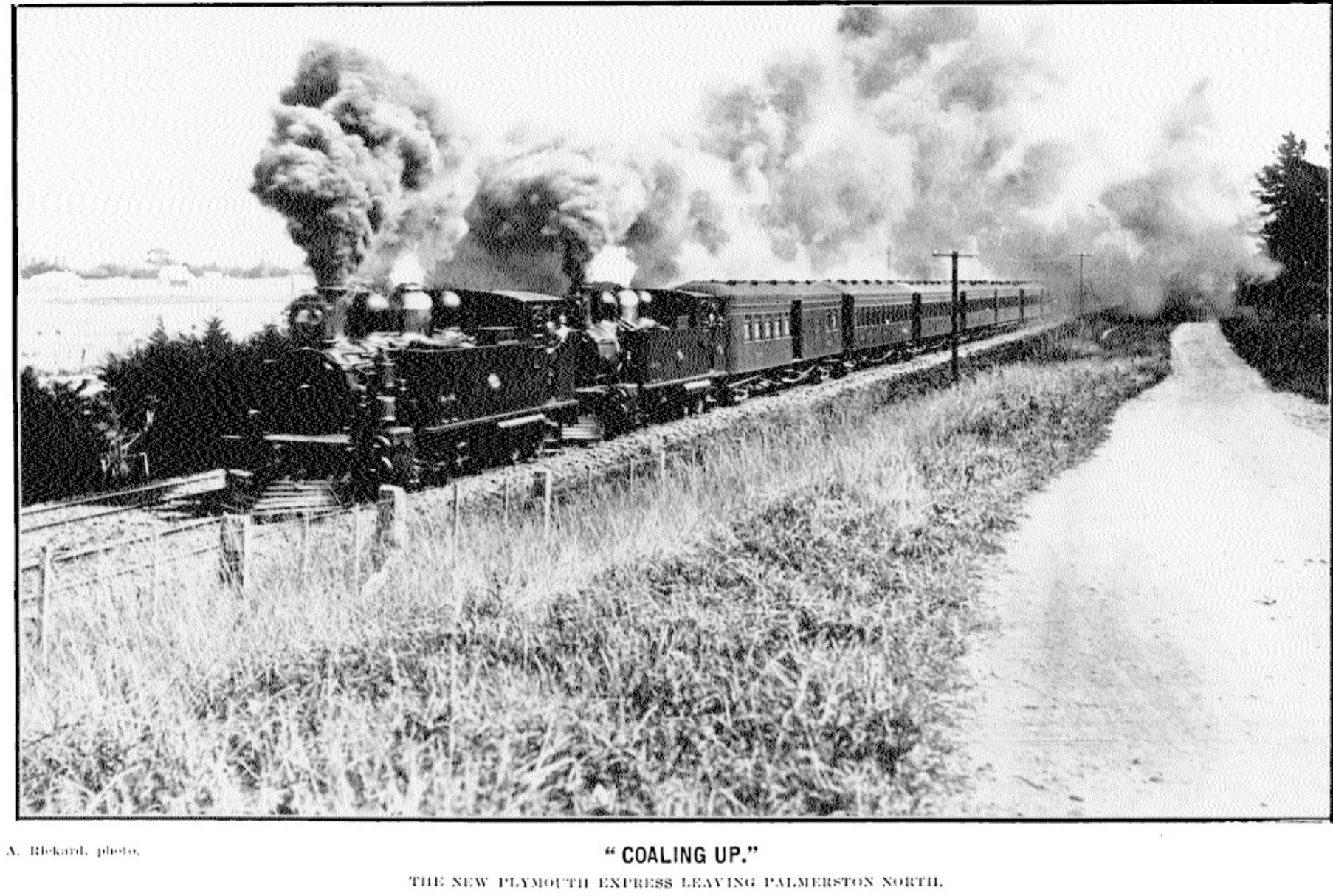
New Plymouth Express leaving Palmerston North in 1910

Tank locomotives were the primary motive power on the Marton - New Plymouth Line for many years. These included E, M, W^{A}, W^{B}, W^{D}, W^{F}, and W^{W} classes at various times between 1886 and 1925, plus B^{B} class tender locomotives. 1925 saw A^{B} class tender engines used throughout, and in the late 1930s the K and K^{A} classes were phased in, followed by the J^{A} class after WWII. The final regular steam-hauled Express was hauled by J^{A} 1289.

=== The Ferry ===
The Ferry was a short twice-daily passenger service between Wanganui and Aramoho on the main line, where the Express stopped. During the era of the A^{B} class working the Express locomotives were changed at Aramoho, and The Ferry was closely tied to this procedure. The first Ferry of the day from Wanganui met the southbound Express to Wellington at Aramoho. The Ferry's A^{B} and any carriages from Wanganui for Wellington were attached to the Express, and the Express's A^{B} and any New Plymouth carriages for Wanganui were detached. The Express continued south, while its original engine hauled The Ferry back to Wanganui. This engine and The Ferry returned to Aramoho to meet the northbound Express to New Plymouth, where the engine and any Wanganui carriages for New Plymouth were attached to the Express after the Express's A^{B} and any Wellington carriages for Wanganui were detached. The Express then continued to New Plymouth, headed by the engine that had hauled the southbound Express to Aramoho and the Ferry to Wanganui and back, while the engine from Wellington took the final Ferry of the day to Wanganui.

When the K and K^{A} locomotives were introduced, The Ferry was retained. However, in later years the locomotive change took place in Palmerston North, with the same locomotive running the train between New Plymouth and Palmerston North. This eliminated the locomotive workings around which The Ferry was based, and it was replaced with a bus service.

== Replacement ==
The demise of the Express came in 1955. That year the 88-seater railcars were introduced, allowing redeployed Standard railcars to replace the Express. This took effect on 31 October 1955, with the journey accelerated to 7.25 hours. As the 88-seater fleet expanded, they joined the Standards on the Wellington-New Plymouth run and operated it until 17 December 1972. In 1968 three 88-seaters were extensively refurbished and renamed "Blue Streaks" because of their distinctive paint scheme, and in 1972 they were allocated to the Wellington-New Plymouth service. The Blue Streaks operated the Express's former run while unrefurbished 88-seaters continued on the evening service, which was reduced to running on Fridays and Sundays. The evening service was soon withdrawn, and the Blue Streaks were cancelled on 30 July 1977.
