= Marton railway station, New Zealand =

Railway station in New Zealand

Marton railway station
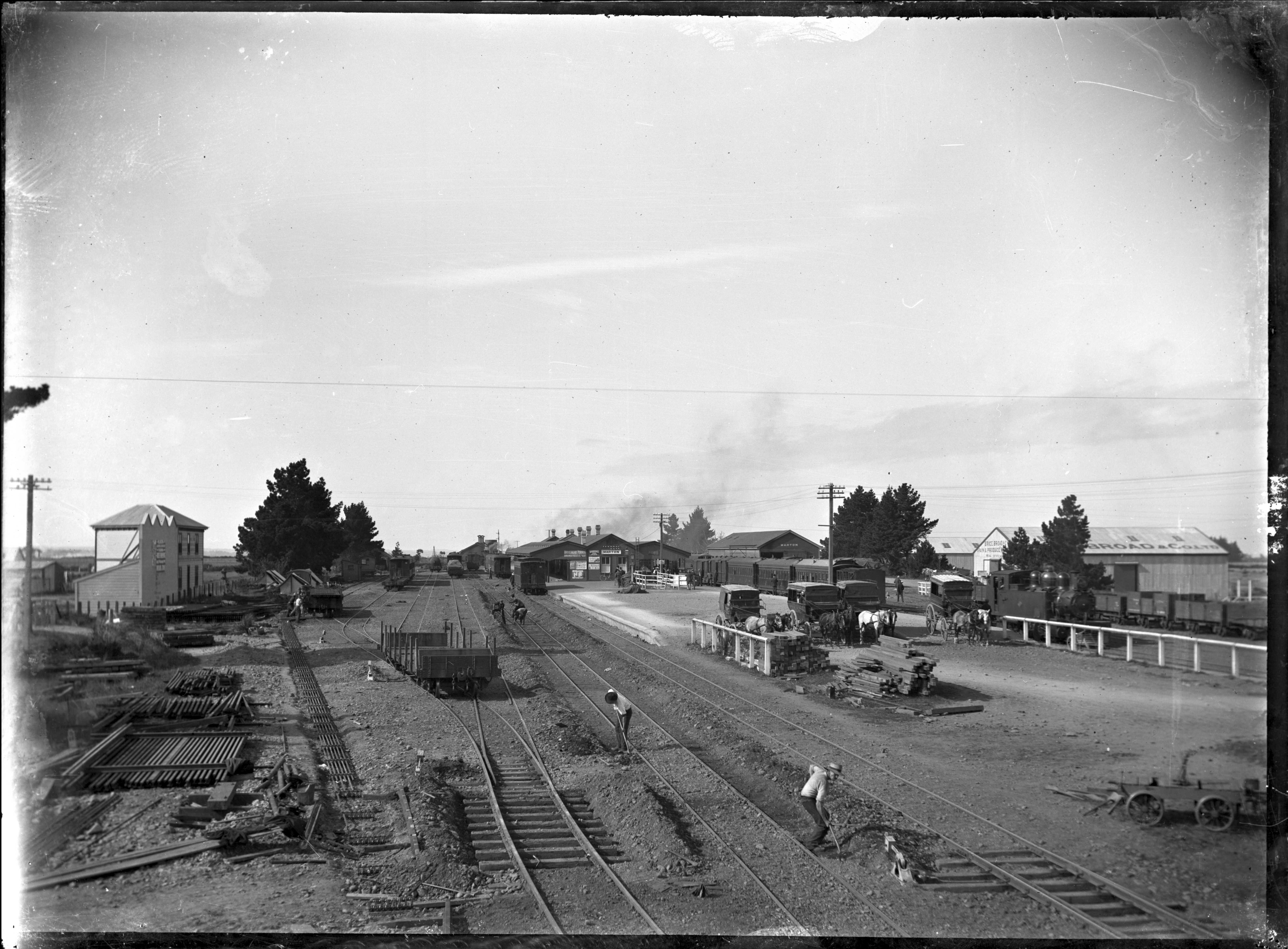
- Marton Railway Station in 1909

General information
- Location: New Zealand
- Coordinates: 40.087°S 175.391°E
- Elevation: 141 m (463 ft)
- Line: North Island Main Trunk
- Distance: Wellington 180.25 km (112.00 mi)

History
- Opened: 4 February 1878
- Closed: passengers 25 June 2012
- Rebuilt: 1 June 1898 and 1 April 1965
- Electrified: June 1988

Services
| Preceding station | Historical railways | Following station |
|---|---|---|
| Cliff Road; Line open, station closed 3.33 km (2.07 mi) | North Island Main Trunk; KiwiRail | Greatford; Line open, station closed 4.24 km (2.63 mi) |
| Pukepapa; Line open, station closed 2.6 km (1.6 mi) | Marton–New Plymouth line KiwiRail | Terminus |
Location

Marton railway station was a station and rail junction on the Marton–New Plymouth Line, opened on 4 February 1878. After the North Island Main Trunk (NIMT) made a junction to the south of Marton, a new station was built there and the old station renamed and downgraded, in 1898.

The station served Marton, the largest town in the Rangitīkei District, which is in the Manawatū-Whanganui region of New Zealand. It is now disused, except for an occasional excursion train. The pedestrian subway linking to the station remains in use.

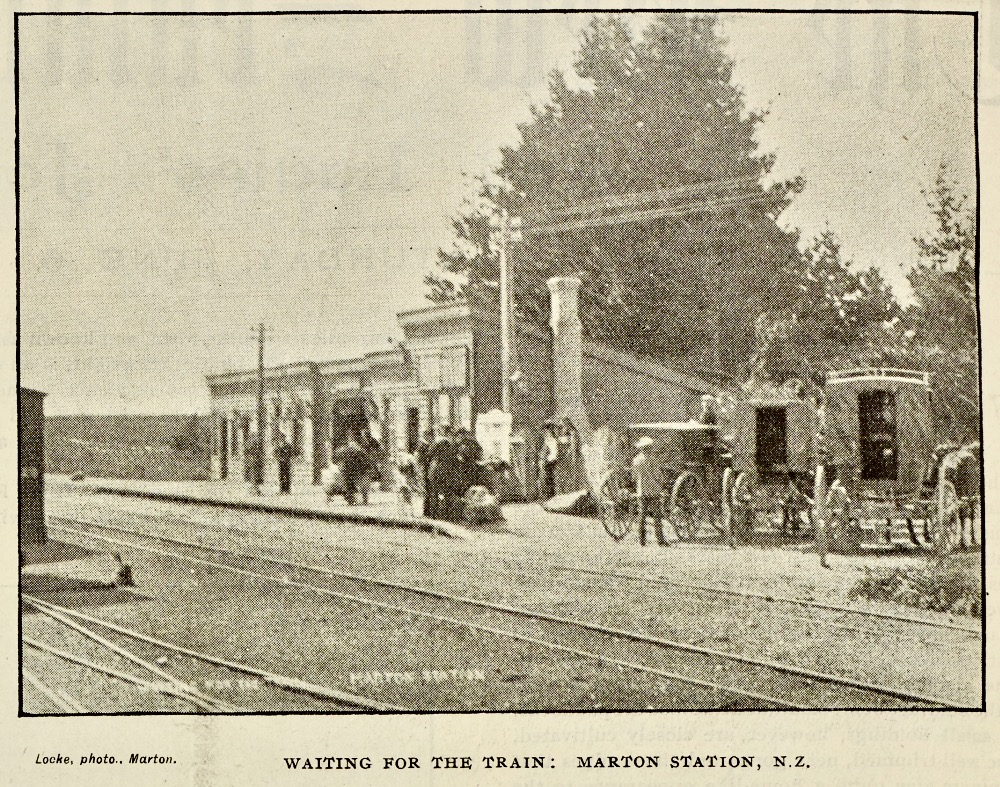
The original Marton railway station in 1896. This station was renamed Pukepapa from 1 June 1898 and closed on 10 August 1959

A fire broke out in the disused station during the morning of 4 January 2026, damaging part of the building. KiwiRail is to demolish the station building.

== History ==
The first railway to Marton was on the line linking the ports of Foxton and Whanganui to their hinterland. It opened in sections.

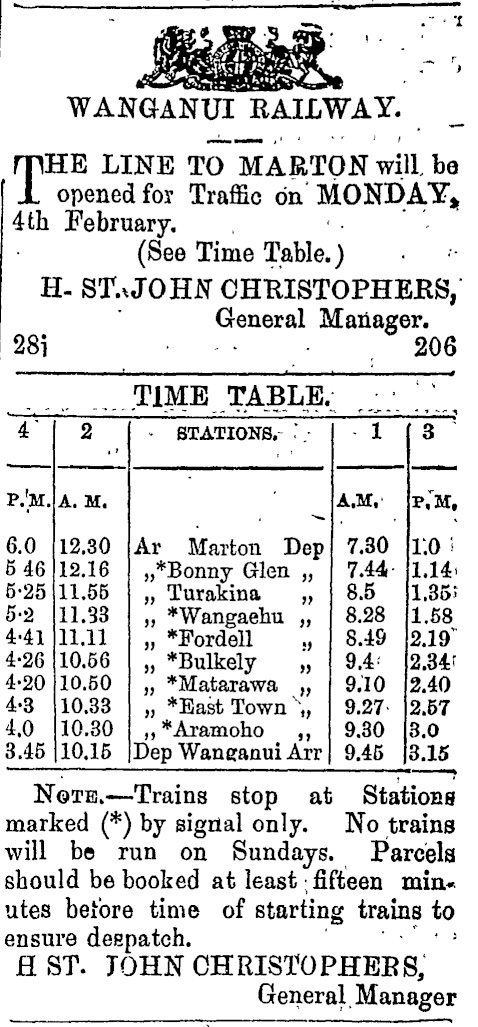
Trains from Whanganui were extended south, from Turakina to Marton, on 4 February 1878

The line from Whanganui to Turakina opened on Thursday 17 May 1877, declared a public holiday by Whanganui's mayor. Stewart & Co built the extension from Turakina to Marton. The earthworks to Marton were said to be completed by the end of 1876. However, trains weren't extended south until 4 February 1878. Two months later there was criticism that Marton station was too small and too far from the town; in 1875 there had been a plan for the station to be 8 chains (530 ft; 160 m) further east, which would have been closer to the town centre.

The contract for the final link, from Feilding to the Rangitīkei River, was let on 28 June 1876. Special trains ran from Halcombe and from Palmerston North to Marton in April 1878. The Foxton to Whanganui line was fully opened on 20 May 1878.

Marton Junction was formed when the Hunterville branch opened to Kaikarangi on Saturday, 2 June 1888. Mixed trains from the branch called at the junction to shunt wagons, before continuing to Marton. In March 1895 a telephone was provided to link Marton and Marton Jct. In 1887 further contracts for NIMT were suspended, as there was doubt as to whether it would go via Stratford, or by an extension of the Hunterville Branch. Although no conclusive decision had been reached on the routes, even by 1900, Marton station was moved to the junction in 1898.

=== Pukepapa railway station ===
The original Marton station was renamed Pukepapa from Wednesday 1 June 1898 and became a flag station for passengers only, when the new station opened at the junction, 1 mi 47 ch (2.6 km) to the south east. Pukepapa closed on 10 August 1959.

G F Baker completed a station at Marton on 10 October 1876. Alexander & McFarlane added more buildings by 15 May 1878 and Andrew C Riggs added more by 2 January 1880. By 1884 there was a 4th class station, 60 ft (18 m) by 30 ft (9.1 m) goods shed, loading bank, cattle and sheep yards, stationmaster's house, passenger platform, cart approach and a passing loop for 15 wagons.

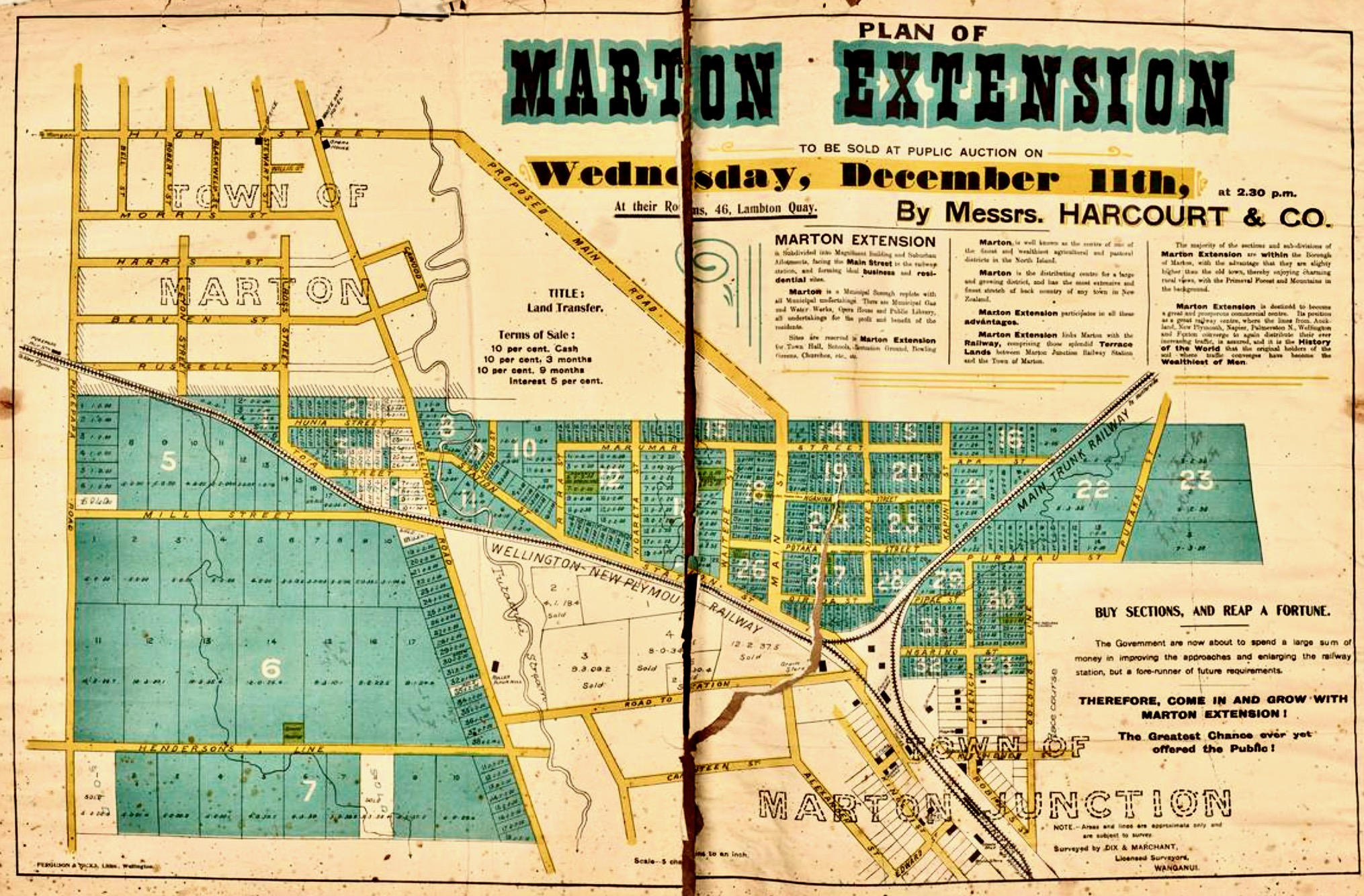
Marton was extended to its new junction station from 1907. The original Pukepapa station is on the far left of the plan, neither being convenient for the original town

=== Marton Junction ===
Plans were made and initial contracts signed in 1885 for a new station and engine shed at the junction and a road to link it to High Street, at a cost of £4120 for works and £679 for buildings. It was ready to open by 27 July 1885. From 5 November 1886 trains stopped at Marton Junction for goods traffic only, though goods weren't carried on the new branch until at least 19 October 1887. Originally there was no shelter on the platform at the new station. One was erected between November 1889 and March 1891. By 1896 there was a shelter shed, passenger platform, crane, water service, coal accommodation, engine shed, stationmaster's house and a passing loop for 40 wagons. A bookstall was discussed in 1898 and out for tender in 1911. From its official opening on 1 June, it had a stationmaster and its name was changed from Marton Junction to Marton. By 1 December 1898 it also had a cart approach (Henderson Brothers offered land for the road in 1896), 90 ft (27 m) by 30 ft (9.1 m) goods shed, loading bank, cattle and sheep yards, engine turning triangle, fixed signals and urinals. In 1905 it was noted that it was a lean-to type station building, with a round-roof goods shed. It was also noted that the reversing triangle, put in for the Royal Train in 1901, was of little use for ordinary shunting and out of use. Railway houses were built in 1898, 1913, 1953, 1954 and 1955 and the stationmaster's house improved in 1900. There was a post office and public telephone at the station from November 1898 until 31 August 1934. Station Rd had a gas lit footpath added in 1911. and the station, yard, and engine shed were gas lit in 1916. In 1928 Marton had two signal cabins. In 1929 a 70 ft (21 m) turntable was built. In 1991 it was noted as being in very poor condition and not needed. In 1987 train examining was removed from Marton.

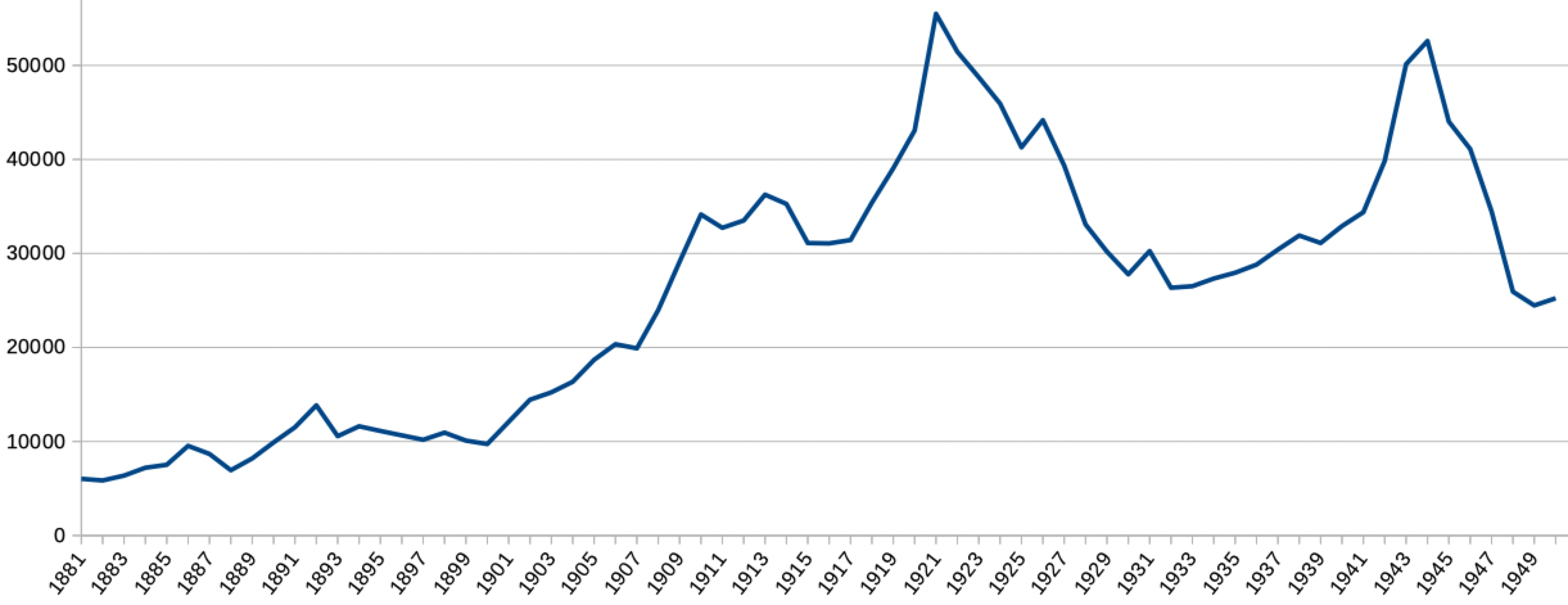
tickets sales 1881–1950 – derived from annual returns to Parliament of "Statement of Revenue for each Station for the Year ended"

Marton had its annual returns of traffic recorded, as did Turakina and Hunterville to the north and Greatford to the south. For example, it had 48,744 passengers in 1923, and a large inward flow of sheep and pigs at 53,362.

In 1931 the station employed 15 salaried staff, in addition to those in the locomotive, maintenance, signal & electrical and traffic branches.

==== Refreshment rooms ====
On 24 December 1898 the refreshment rooms at Halcombe were replaced by those at Marton. More rooms were built in 1901 and a counter refreshment room added in 1905. In 1917, when dining cars were removed from trains, a set table refreshment room opened. From 1940 to 1954 there was a railway hostel for female refreshment room staff. With faster trains and railcars the need for refreshment stops reduced, and they closed on 14 June 1954.

==== 1960s rebuilding ====
In October 1963 Blain Building Coy Ltd, Halcombe started work on a £40,749.18.0 contract to demolish the old station and build a new one. It was done in stages, with the old station building demolished in August 1964 and the new station, 236 ft (72 m) by 27 ft (8.2 m), opened on Thursday, 1 April 1965. On 1 April 1993 a third of the new station building was destroyed by fire.

A new diesel and wagon depot was built in 1966 by W M Angus Ltd, Wanganui. It was 62 ft (19 m) by 33 ft (10 m), with a steel frame, concrete ends and corrugated aluminium sheeting on the sides and roof.

=== Services ===
The first trains connected Marton and Whanganui from 4 February 1878. They ran twice a day in each direction.

From 1879 the service was extended south to link with the Feilding-Foxton service.

The New Plymouth Express, Night Limited, Scenic Daylight, Silver Star, Silver Fern, Blue Streak, Northerner and Overlander all stopped at the station. The first Auckland - Wellington through expresses ran on 14 February 1909, taking 19 hours 13 minutes, and stopping at Marton. As early as 1917 a bus competed for Whanganui passengers, following cuts in railway services.

== Freight ==
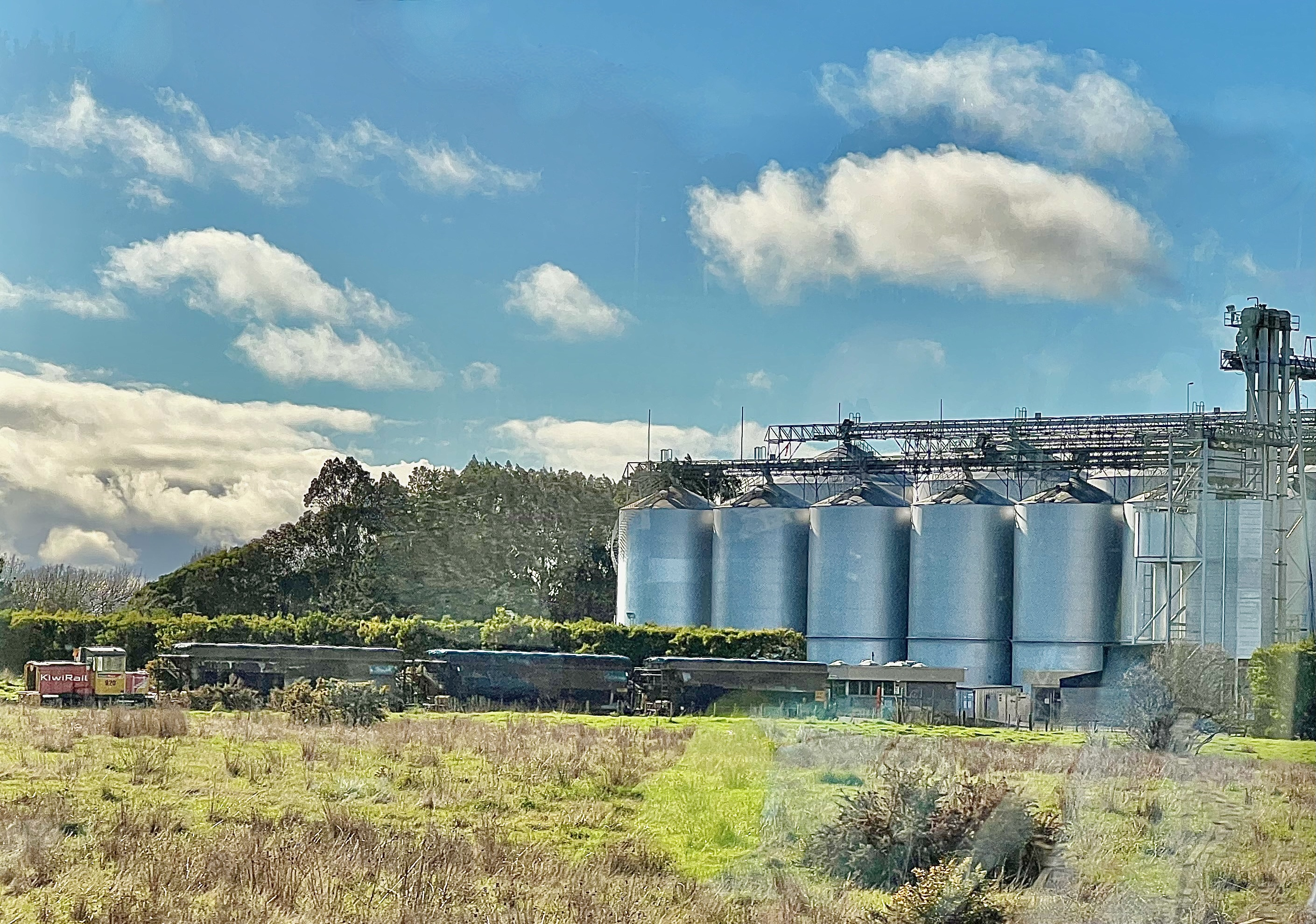
Tr 920 with grain hoppers at Marton maltings in 2024

Malteurop has a two sidings south of Marton, built in 1979, where it makes about 45,000 tons of malt a year and imports barley from Timaru. Since the disruption of the 2016 Kaikōura earthquake, most of the barley has been shipped via Whanganui. Much of the malt is sent to Auckland for Lion and DB breweries.

In 2020 a plan was announced for a $9.1m forestry based rail hub. The former goods yard was derelict in 2019.
