= Ngaere swamp complex =

Former wetlands in New Zealand

Coordinates: 39.45°S 174.41°E

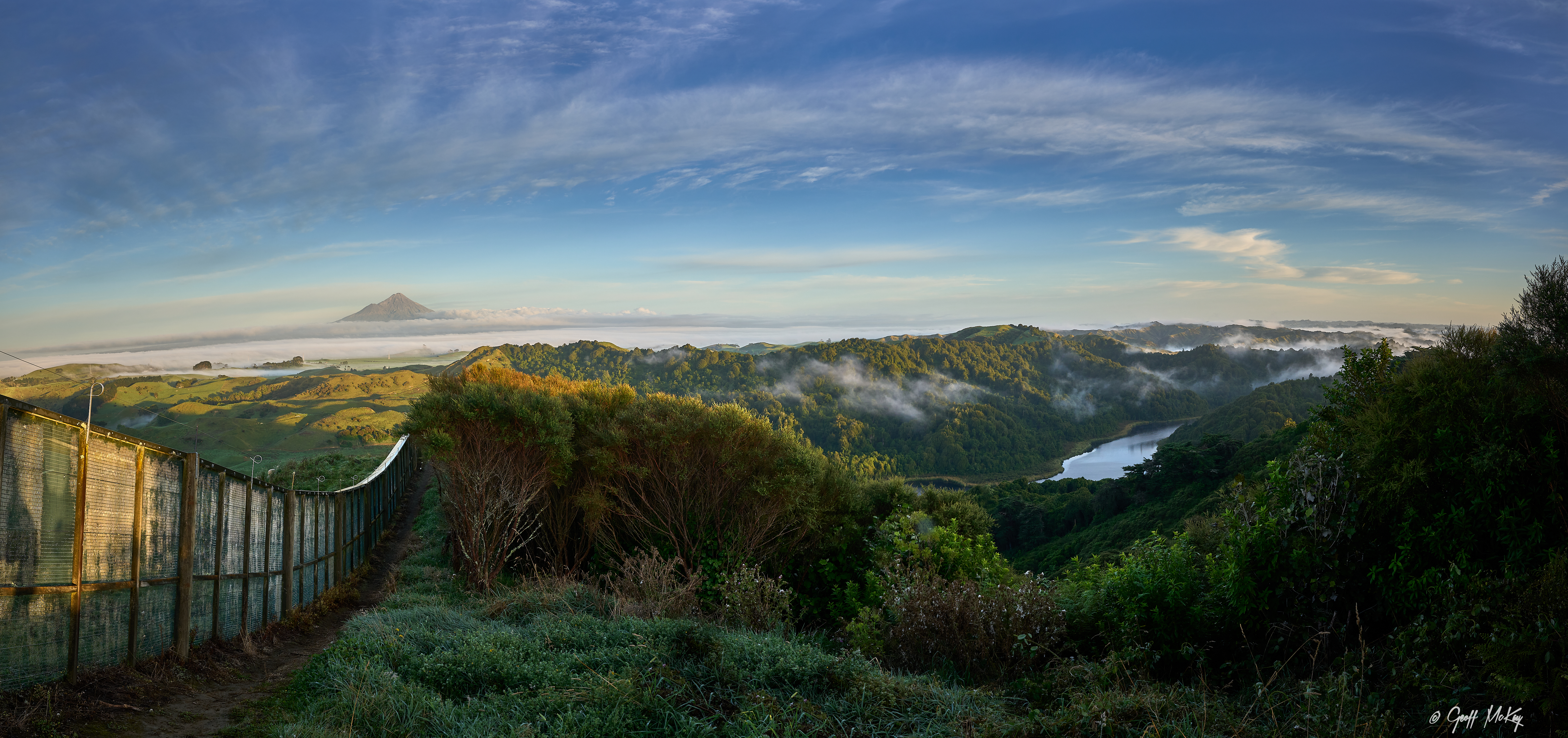
The remnants of the swamp complex are part of the conservation area in the valley in the middle of the picture surrounding Lake Rotokare.

The Ngaere swamp complex was a wetland complex in the Taranaki region of New Zealand. It was drained in the 1890s to make way for agriculture, and is now largely covered by the settlements of Ngaere and Eltham. Lake Rotokare is the largest extant remnant of the swamp complex, which covered 1,416 hectares (3,500 acres).

Situated in the rohe (domain) of the Ngāti Tupaia iwi, the wetland featured prominently in Māori mythology as a stop made by Mount Taranaki when fleeing the Tongariro volcanic centre. Vegetation around the swamp complex included kahikatea, pukatea and swamp maire.

== History ==
The Ngaere swamp complex consisted of two swamps: the Ngaere swamp, at a level of 220 metres (720 feet), and the Eltham swamp, at 210 metres (690 feet). The latter was drained by a tributary of the Waingongoro River to the west, and by the Mangimangi Stream to the south. The swamp complex was formed by lahar deposits from Opunake and Stratford between 50,000 and 23,000 years ago.

Draining of the swamp complex commenced in the 1890s. The land it formerly covered is now mostly pasture, though the original swamp forest has remnants on the western and northern edges of the Eltham swamp. In 2024, the rare plant species Gratiola concinna native to the Ngaere swamp complex was transplanted in Lake Rotokare.

== Cultural significance ==
Prior to its draining, the wetland provided a source of food for Māori inhabitants of the area, who hunted in it for eels, waterfowl and kōtuku. The kiekie plant found in the swamp was also an important food source during the summer months.

According to Māori mythology, the swamp was formed by Mount Taranaki while fleeing from Mount Tongariro. Mount Ruapehu, who was wed to Taranaki, was said to have engaged in an affair with Tongariro, leading to a battle between Tongariro and Taranaki. Taranaki lost the battle, causing him to travel westward. Taranaki's travel is also said to have formed the gorges of the Whanganui River.
