= Whareroa railway station =

Former railway station in Taranaki, New Zealand

Whareroa

General information
- Location: Whareroa Road; Hāwera; New Zealand
- Coordinates: 39°36′23.7″S 174°18′9.7″E
- Elevation: 55 metres (180 ft)
- System: New Zealand Government Railways (NZGR); Regional rail
- Line: Marton–New Plymouth line
- Distance: 49 mi 4 ch (approx. 78.9 km (49.0 mi)) from New Plymouth
- Platforms: Single, right side
- Tracks: 1

Construction
- Structure type: At-grade

History
- Opened: 23 March 1885; 141 years ago
- Closed: 7 November 1965; 61 years ago (all traffic)
Location
Notes
- Previous Station: Mokoia Station; Next Station: Hāwera Station

Whareroa railway station was a rural railway station on the Marton–New Plymouth line, serving the district between Mokoia and Hāwera in Taranaki, New Zealand. It served the surrounding farming community for eighty years, from its construction in the mid-1880s until its closure to all traffic in 1965. The site went on to a second life from the 1970s as the rail-served yard for a large dairy factory.

== History ==
=== Construction and early facilities ===
Whareroa station lay on the final section of the Marton–New Plymouth line to be completed: the roughly 16-kilometre gap between Hāwera and Manutahi that closed the line between the railway's northern and southern railheads. Preparatory work began before the line opened: in February 1884 the Public Works Department sought instructions on the style of sidings to be installed at the 40-mile-43-chain mark on Whareroa Road, and a tracing with cost estimate for the station itself followed the next month. The gap was finally bridged, including viaducts over the Tangahoe and Manawapou Rivers, and the through line from Marton to New Plymouth opened for revenue service on 23 March 1885. By June that year, works were already underway to construct a road through the new station yard.

Unlike its larger neighbours, Whareroa was equipped only with a modest accommodation shelter shed, located on the right-hand side of the line (looking north), alongside a passenger platform, a goods shed measuring 30 by 15 feet, a loading bank, and urinals. A 1896 survey recorded a goods loop able to hold 19 wagons; by 1897 this had been enlarged to 22 wagons, a capacity that remained unchanged for the following decade and a half.

=== Community life ===
As with many small wayside stations, Whareroa featured in the life of its surrounding district beyond its role moving goods and passengers. In April 1917, the Public Works Department let a contract for a new rifle range near the station, providing for shooting distances of up to 600 yards and intended for completion by July that year.

In April 1925, a correspondent to the Taranaki Daily News complained that the railway reserve at Whareroa station was being overrun by tall fescue grass, noting the weed's tendency to be infested with ergot and warning of the risk of abortion in in-calf cows that grazed on it.

The following year, a Hāwera resident wrote to the Hawera Star complaining at length about stockyards erected near Whareroa railway station, describing overpowering odours from pigs held there, incessant squealing overnight, and a household member made ill by the stench. The writer, who signed only as "Resident", called for the borough authorities to deal with the stockyards and saleyards nuisance, and remarked pointedly that if the Whareroa correspondent did not press for the yards to be moved, the neighbouring settlement of Turuturu might get them instead.

The nearby Whareroa School had closed by the mid-1930s. In December 1935, the Taranaki Education Board discussed a renewed request for a grant to convey the district's schoolchildren from Manawapou Road to Hāwera, which the department had declined; board members noted that some children could instead travel by train from Whareroa station to Tawhiti School.

=== 1947 derailment ===
On 6 April 1947, a southbound railcar travelling from Hāwera collided with cattle being driven across the Whareroa level crossing. About 100 cattle, consigned to the Pātea Freezing Works, were being moved over the crossing towards the main highway when the railcar, only a few minutes out of Hāwera, struck the herd. The railcar's front wheels were lifted off the rails by the impact, though it did not overturn, and none of its roughly 36 passengers were injured. Eleven cattle were killed, with two carried around 30 yards by the collision and others thrown into the cattle-stops beside the crossing or into nearby scrub. Most passengers were taken on by bus while the railcar was inspected, resuming its journey that evening once cleared.

== Closure ==
Whareroa station closed to all traffic on 7 November 1965.

== Post-closure: dairy traffic ==
Although the station itself had closed, the site went on to a substantial second life. Operations began at the Kiwi Co-operative Dairies factory at Whareroa, three kilometres south of Hāwera, in August 1973, with capacity more than doubling in 1984 when Kiwi merged with the Taranaki Co-operative Dairy Company. Following Kiwi's 2001 merger with the New Zealand Dairy Group, the factory passed to Fonterra, and has been described as the world's largest dairy processing complex on a single site.

Tranz Rail introduced bulk milk trains in August 1997, running from Oringi and Longburn to the Whareroa dairy factory; the initial trains consisted of 16 bulk milk wagons carrying a combined 800,000 litres of milk. A separate rail yard was built to serve the factory, opening for railway traffic on 21 August 1998. By the early 21st century, Fonterra had become one of KiwiRail's major customers, with milk trains running daily through the roughly seven-month milking season from the Manawatū and Tararua districts to the Whareroa factory, which processes around 13 billion litres of milk annually for export to some 140 countries.

The pattern of outward rail traffic from Whareroa has shifted over time. In 2009, Fonterra redirected a large share of the factory's container traffic away from Port Taranaki to be railed instead to Auckland, Tauranga and Napier, a move reported to cut around 22,000 containers from the record 65,000 the port had handled the previous year; KiwiRail's chief executive at the time described the decision as Fonterra's own commercial choice rather than the result of any preferential arrangement. By 2019, product from Whareroa was instead being railed south to Palmerston North before being railed north again, a roundabout routing that KiwiRail hoped a reopened Stratford–Okahukura line might shorten.

The line past the former station remains in active use. In November 2025, a freight train travelling from New Plymouth to Palmerston North partially derailed just outside the Whareroa factory, closing the Taranaki Line for several days while KiwiRail cleared the site; no injuries were reported.
