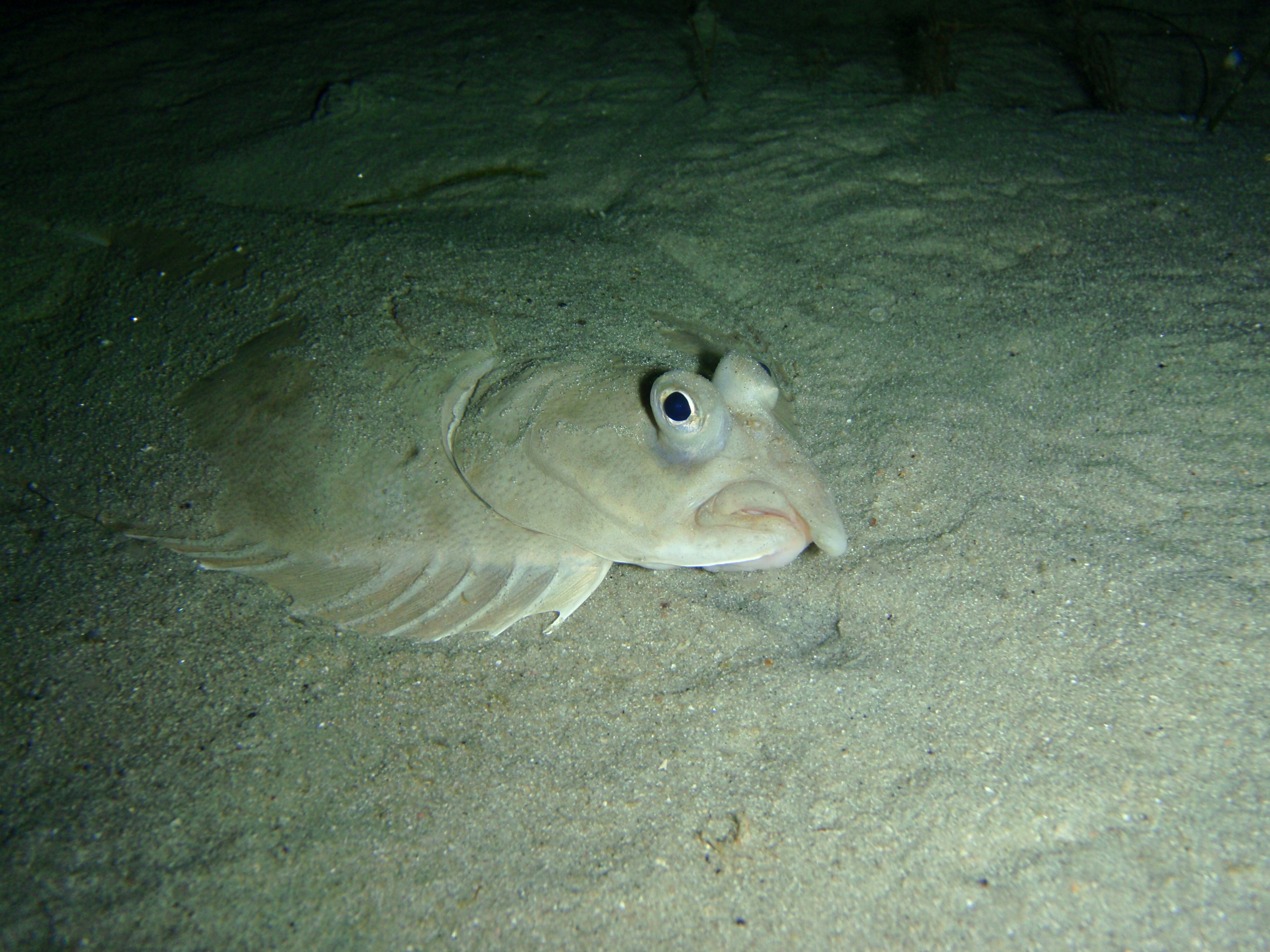

Scientific classification
- Kingdom: Animalia
- Phylum: Chordata
- Class: Actinopterygii
- Division: Teleostei
- Order: Carangiformes
- Suborder: Pleuronectoidei
- Family: Rhombosoleidae
- Genus: Rhombosolea
- Species: R. tapirina

Binomial name
- Rhombosolea tapirina Günther, 1862

Synonyms
- Rhombosolea monopus Günther 1862: Rhombosolea flesoides Günther 1863 (original combination); Pleuronectes victoriae Castelnau 1872; Rhombosolea victoriae Macleay 1881

= Greenback flounder =

Species of fish

The greenback flounder (Rhombosolea tapirina) is a righteye flounder of the genus Rhombosolea, found around southern Australia and New Zealand.

== Description ==
The length of the holotype is 242 mm.

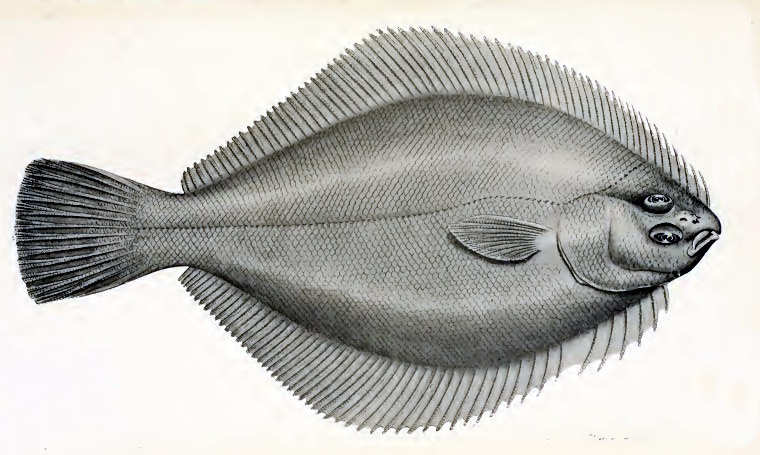
Original drawing of Rhombosolea tapirina

(Original description) Length of head 3.5; depth of body 2.1, and length of caudal 4.2 in the total length.

Eyes on the right side, separated by a smooth narrow space, one-fourth the diameter of the eye. The lower eye is noticeably in advance of the upper and the diameter is 4 '8 in the length of the head, or but slightly less than that of the snout. The latter is produced into a fleshy process directed downwards over the mouth. The anterior nostril may be closed by a trilobed process. The hinder one lies posterior to the front edge of the lower eye and is a simple pore. The mouth is of moderate size extending to nearly below the anterior margin of the eye: it is more extensive on the blind side, and has two rows of teeth in each jaw. The nostrils have a higher and more anterior position than on the right side. Gill-rakers are small, conical, and smooth, slightly fenibriated on the inner side. About thirteen in number on the lower limb, scarcely developed on the hinder one.

Gills three and a half, a slit behind the last, equal to the diameter of the eye. The gill openings are small, not extending to the upper angle of the pectoral above, and closed below the preopercular angle beneath.

Fins.—The dorsal commences on the rostral process, about an eye diameter from its extremity. Though partially free anteriorly, all the rays are connected by membrane. They are highest about the middle of the fin where they form a conspicuous angle, the thirty-fifth or longest ray being 1*9 in the length of the head. The rays are continued to within an eye-diameter of the caudal rays. The ventral commences beneath the middle of the eye and is quite continuous with the anal, the apparent omission of one ray only indicating the distinction. The vent is situated on the left side contiguous to this space. The anal is similar to the dorsal the sixteenth ray being the longest. The right pectoral is pointed above, its length being 1.5 in the length of the head: the left fin is shorter, 1 '9 in the same, and is symmetrical, the central rays being the longest. The caudal is truncate or very slightly rounded, and the depth of the peduncle is 2.2 in the head.

Scales.—The forepart of the head, the interorbital space, the margins of the opercula and the bases of the pectorals are naked. The body is covered on both sides with cycloid scales, non-imbricate on the anterior portion, but overlapping behind, and upon the caudal peduncle. Fins scaleless. The lateral line runs almost straight, there being a slight curve over the anterior half of the pectoral, which is less marked on the blind side; anteriorly on both sides, the line is continued over the head to the base of the seventh or eighth dorsal ray.

Colours.—Uniform grey above and yellow beneath.
