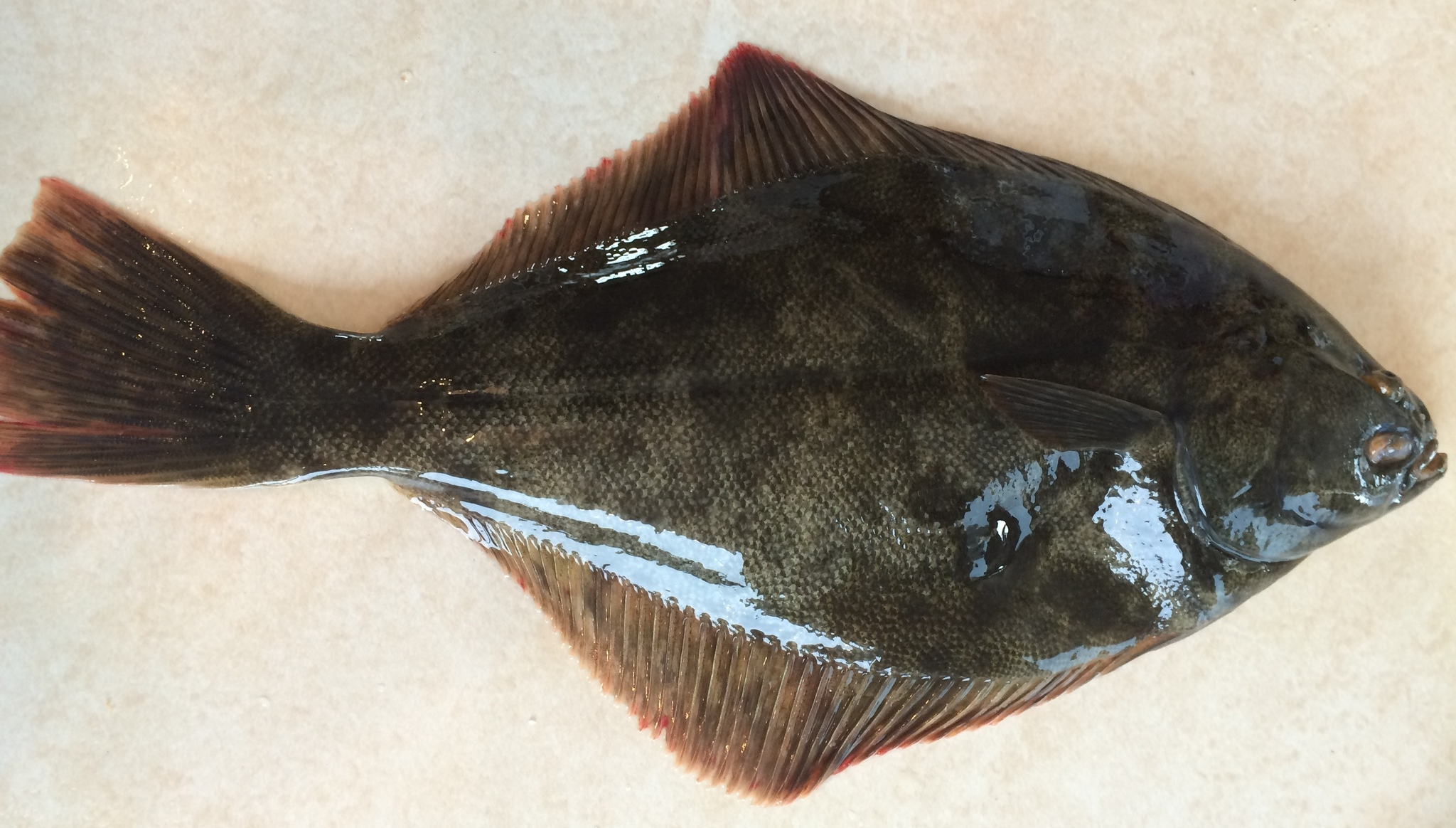

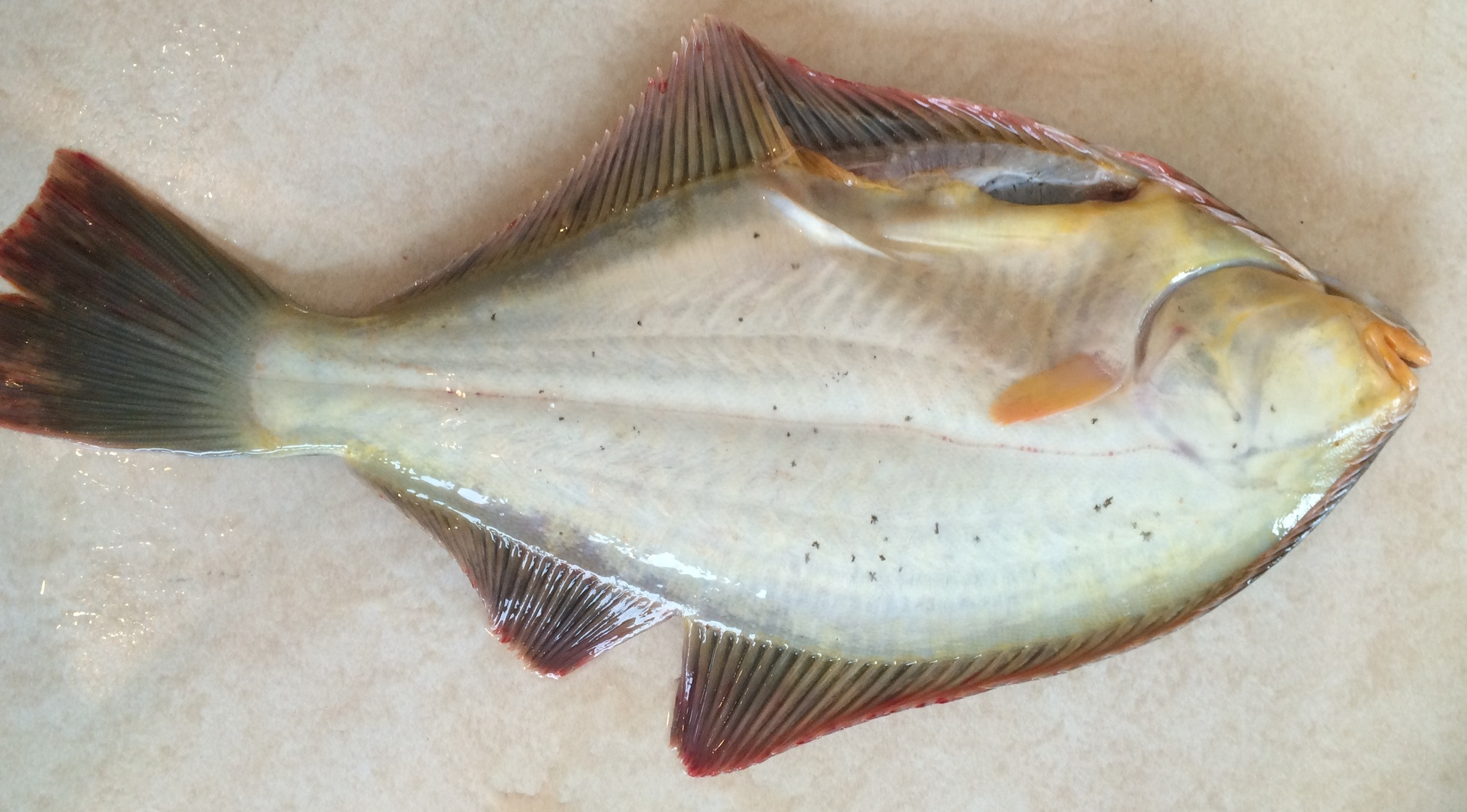

Scientific classification
- Kingdom: Animalia
- Phylum: Chordata
- Class: Actinopterygii
- Order: Carangiformes
- Suborder: Pleuronectoidei
- Family: Rhombosoleidae
- Genus: Rhombosolea
- Species: R. leporina

Binomial name
- Rhombosolea leporina Günther, 1862

Synonyms
- Rhombosolea millari Waite, 1911

= Yellowbelly flounder =

Species of fish

The yellowbelly flounder (Rhombosolea leporina; Māori: pātiki tōtara or pātōtara) is a flatfish of the genus Rhombosolea, found around New Zealand. A different species from the genus Rhombosolea is found in Australia and also goes by the name yellow-belly flounder. The Māori people have commonly fished for R. leporina, and many other species of flatfish, throughout New Zealand's coastal waters for hundreds of years. The Māori name for this species is pātiki tōtara.

== Identification ==
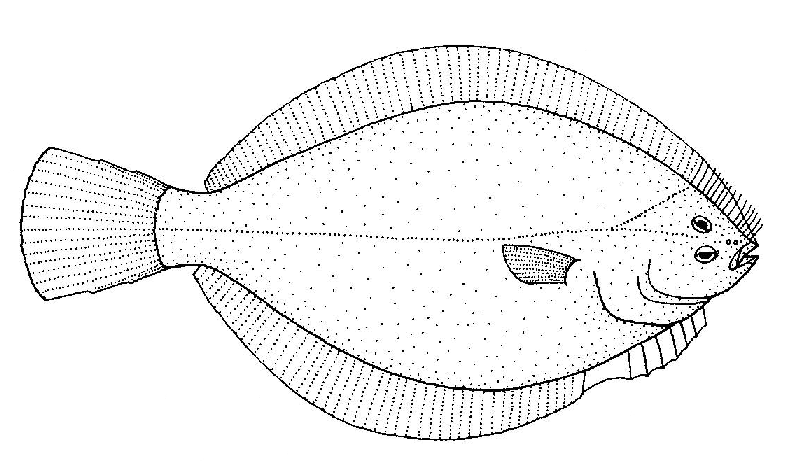
Drawing by Dr Tony Ayling

Rhombosolea leporina is part of the flounder family Pleuronectidae, where all species have both eyes on the right side of their bodies. This ocular side is a dark olive green, with dark-edged, smooth scales. The underside/blindside is usually white in juveniles, eventually becoming yellow with dark spots as the flounder matures. Adult flounders have long, oval shaped bodies, with small eyes that are set further back from the pointed snout than most flounder species. They also have 13–17 rakers in each gill, on both sides of the body, and approximately 75–86 scales along the lateral line. The average length of adults is between 25–40 cm, with some female reaching up to 45 cm. Females are on average longer and heavier than males.

== Distribution ==
R. leporina is only found in the South Pacific and is endemic to New Zealand's coastal waters. This species is widely distributed throughout New Zealand's inshore areas, but is more abundant around the North Island than the South Island, due to the flounder favouring a warmer climate.

== Habitat ==
R. leporina lives in the demersal zone of mud/sand flats, estuaries, bays, harbours and other moderately shallow areas along the coastal sea margin. The demersal zone includes the seafloor and bottom of the water column that lies above it. Like many species of flounder, they are benthic fish, meaning they live and feed on the seafloor.

Their preferred habitat temperature ranges from 12–18˚C, with larvae and juveniles preferring a higher temperature and adults preferring a lower temperature, especially during their breeding season. As flounder mature, they change their habitat depending on their life-stage. Larvae and juveniles <5 cm long tend to favour the warm, shallow waters of mud/sandflats that are heated by the sun.

Young flounder that are 5–20 cm long migrate out with the ebb tide and inhabit the slightly deeper inshore channels. Once the flounders reach adulthood, they migrate further out into the deeper and colder coastal waters. During spawning season in the winter and spring months, adults move offshore into coastal waters approximately 30-50m in depth to reproduce.

== Life cycle ==
R. leporina usually has a lifespan of three to four years, but in some cases, individuals may reach five years with good health and habitat conditions. This means that most individuals will only be able to spawn once in their lifetime, although those exceeding four years may be able to spawn twice (Coleman 1973, Paul 2000, p. 142). Their life cycle begins during spring when spawning season occurs in coastal waters averaging 15 °C and 30-50m deep.

After the eggs have been laid by the female flounder, larvae take four to five days to hatch when reared in controlled conditions, at 15 °C, in the laboratory. The embryo has a small yolk which feeds the larva as it drifts with the tide from a pelagic environment, towards the shallow and sheltered mud/sand flats along the coastline. Because the yolk cannot sustain the larva for very long, adult flounder try to breed in areas that are as close to the coastline as possible, whilst maintaining the right conditions for spawning. This reduces the amount of time that the larva spends feeding itself when drifting with the tides and ensures that the maximum number of offspring reach the inshore waters.

After hatching, R. leporina larvae are bilaterally symmetrical and resemble the larvae of other teleost species. Eye migration occurs during metamorphosis, where the left eye moves over to the right side of the body, creating an ocular side and blind side on the fish. This metamorphosis occurs as the larva moves from a pelagic habitat to an inshore, demersal one. Juveniles gather in the new inshore habitat and begin to lie on their sides, on the seafloor. The ocular right-side, now with both eyes present, deepens in colour to blend in with surrounding benthic environment, camouflaging the flounder and protecting them from predators. The flounder move into deeper waters as they grow, reaching adulthood after growing longer than 20 cm, at approximately two years of age.

== Reproduction ==
Sexual maturity is attained after age two, where the mean female and male lengths are 29 cm and 24 cm respectively. On average, female flounders have a faster growth rate and are longer and heavier than male flounders.

Female R. leporina are known for their high fecundity, but this can increase or decrease depending on the size and health of the female. Larger females have shown to produce more eggs than smaller females, which is shown in Coleman's monitoring of 676 female R. leporina in the Hauraki gulf. Flounder that were 45 cm in length released up to 1.25 million eggs, while smaller females that were only 30 cm, released around 250,000 eggs.

The winter before spawning season, the gonads of both sexes increase in size and weight. The ovaries in females also begin to develop and mature certain eggs to get them ready for fertilization. Adult flounders migrate offshore during the winter to breed in deeper, coastal areas over the winter and spring months. Although the breeding season is long, lasting at least six months, the flounder only spawn once during this period, before beginning the summer migration back to an estuarine habitat.

== Diet ==
Flounders are benthic feeders, meaning they obtain and consume their food from the seafloor. Juveniles younger than two years old tend to be non-selective with their diet, feeding on mostly small assorted invertebrates and detritus (decomposing plant, animal and other organic matter) at the bottom of shallow mudflats. Their diet consists of mainly amphipods, but they also eat other small crustaceans, annelids, molluscs, and nematodes, which are funnelled into their mouth using their asymmetric jaw. This feeding technique also means that a lot of sand, rock fragments, mud and detritus is funnelled in as well.

Young adults continue to eat a juvenile diet, but become more selective as they transition to an adult diet, consuming larger invertebrates and less sediment. Adults can feed in juvenile nursery areas, but tend to only consume crustaceans that have been swept in at high tide, such as mud crabs. During offshore migration in winter and spring, adults have also been known to consume whitebait.

Because R. leporina has small eyes that are located further back from the snout tip, they lack vision around their mouth region. This is compensated by an enhanced sense of touch in the anterior rays of the dorsal fins, the lateral lines along the body. The anterior rays are used to sense prey buried under sediment, or in turbulent water, and the lateral lines detect waves of pressure and low-frequency sound in the water. This species also has fin rays modified with taste buds, and a tongue and more taste buds located on the blind side of the head. These help the flounder to distinguish prey from any unwanted matter as it eats.

== Threats ==
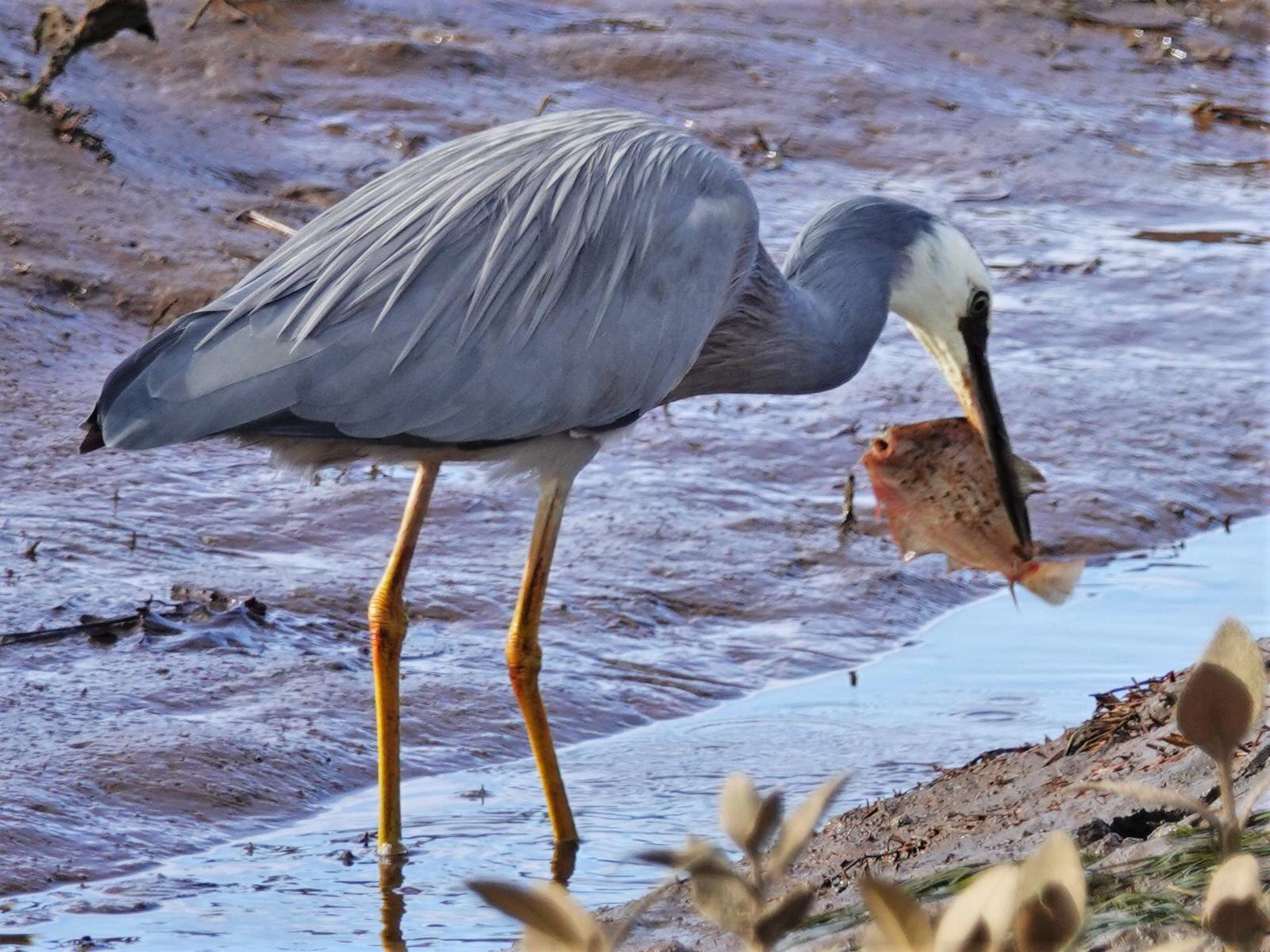
A yellowbelly flounder being eaten by a white-faced heron

=== Predators ===
During daylight when flounder are less active, they reduce the chance of being preyed on by using camouflage. The flounder visually blends into the seafloor and buries itself in the sediment with only its eyes protruding, watching for potential prey or predators. Large fish, sharks and eels prey on flounder when spotted.

=== Parasites ===
The nematode parasite Cucullanus antipodeus is a common present in the stomach and gut of R. leporina, but is mostly present in juveniles due to their non-selective feeding behaviours. Myxosporian parasites are also commonly found in the kidneys of harbor dwelling flounder. It is unsure whether these parasites have a detrimental effect on the host.

=== Disease ===
High temperatures, low oxygen levels, and low pH can cause physiological stress in the flounder, making them more vulnerable to disease and other heath complications. R. leporina is also vulnerable to illnesses and deformities caused by effluent, chemical and industrial pollution run-off in estuarine and harbour areas.

=== Human activity ===
Flounders are recreationally and commercially fished throughout New Zealand by using scoop nets or flatfish trawling, allowing large numbers of flounder to be caught at once. There is great concern surrounding the management of New Zealand's flatfish species, as there is a lack of sustainable management practices, enforcement of catch limits, and safe catching methods. Flatfish trawling, the most common method of catching flounder, causes serious disturbance to benthic habitats and can capture non-target species such as marine mammals, seabirds, and other fish. Although R. leporina population numbers are not currently of concern, it is part of eight species of flatfish that are managed as one fish stock. The lack of monitoring population dynamics and over-generalised management practices has caused concerns over the commercial sustainability of this species.

Weirs built into inland waterways are another threat to R. leporina. Their purpose is to alter the water flow to reduce flooding, slow down the water's velocity, and raise water levels upstream. Weirs can cause mortalities and intercept flounders migrating from inland waterways, to offshore areas for spawning. Consequently, adults are unable to spawn and less offspring are produced, potentially having a negative impact on population numbers.
