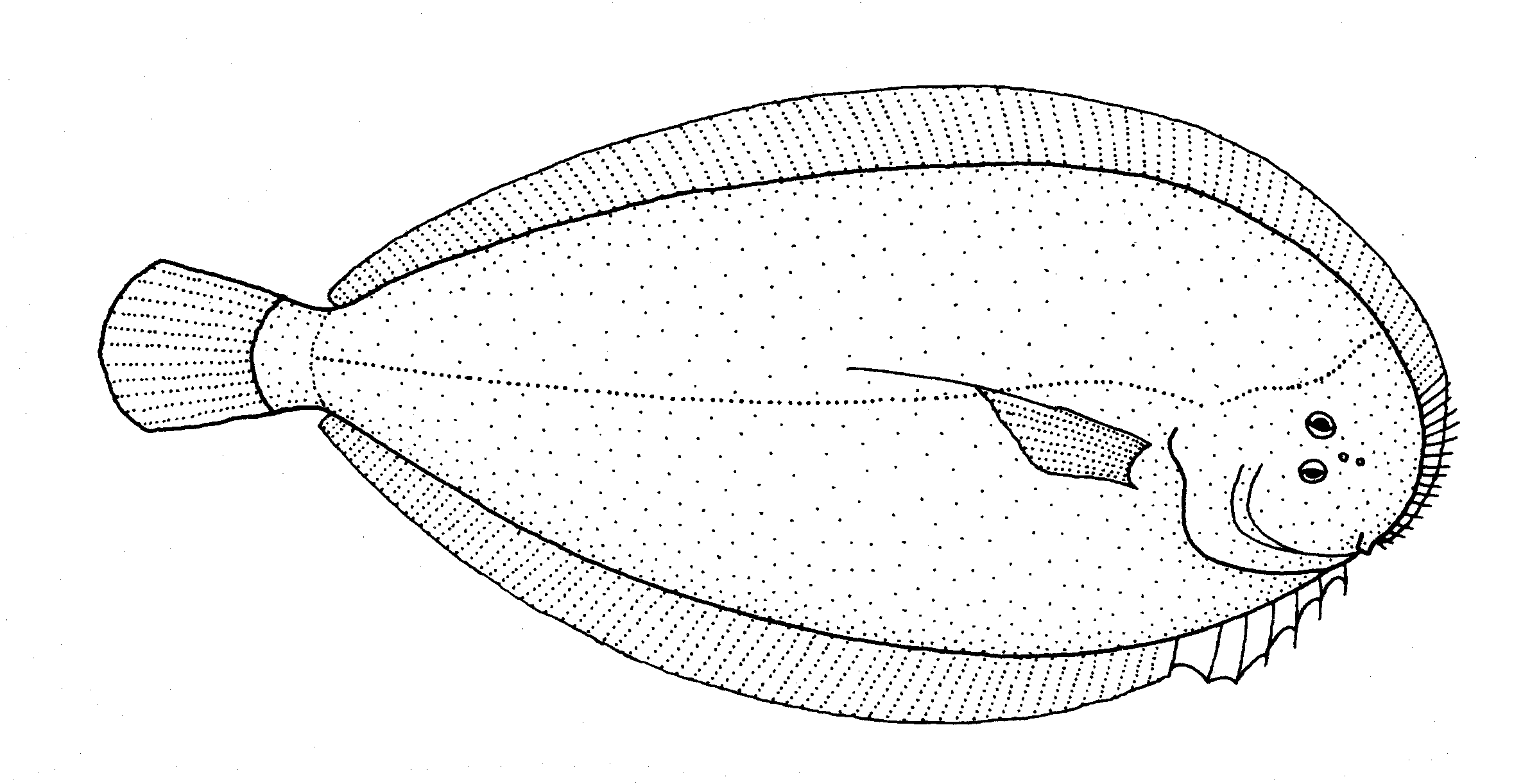
- Drawing by Dr Tony Ayling

Scientific classification
- Kingdom: Animalia
- Phylum: Chordata
- Class: Actinopterygii
- Order: Carangiformes
- Suborder: Pleuronectoidei
- Family: Rhombosoleidae
- Genus: Peltorhamphus
- Species: P. novaezeelandiae

Binomial name
- Peltorhamphus novaezeelandiae Günther, 1862

= New Zealand sole =

Species of fish

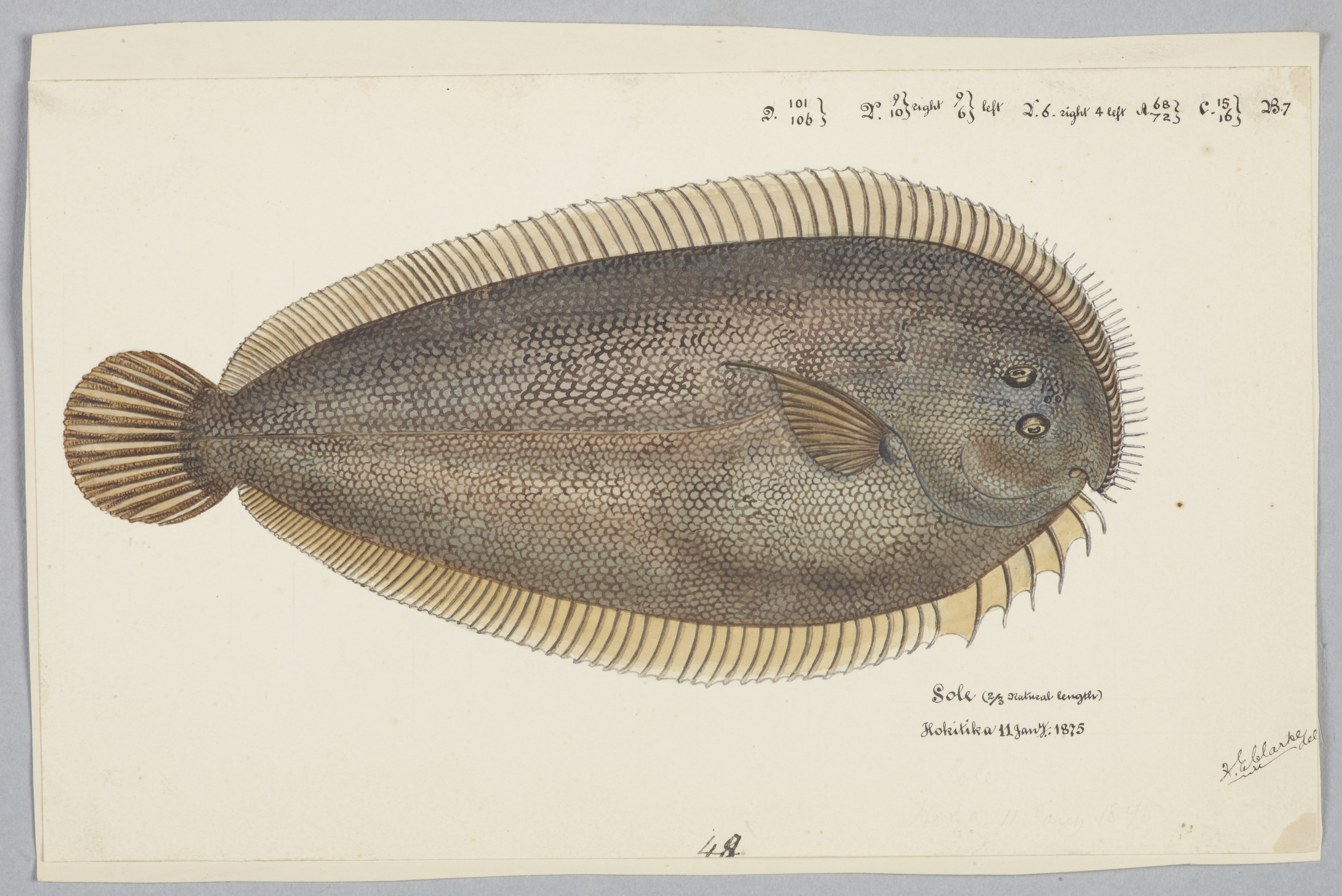
Peltorhamphus novaezeelandiae by Frank Edward Clarke

The New Zealand sole (Peltorhamphus novaezeelandiae), also known as the common sole, is a righteye flounder of the genus Peltorhamphus, found around New Zealand in shallow enclosed waters less than 100 m in depth. Their length is from 25 to 45 cm.

== Names ==
In English, Peltorhamphus novaezeelandiae is known as the common sole or the New Zealand sole. In the indigenous Māori language, the species is known by several names: horihori, pakeke, pātiki rore, pātiki rori, Raututu and tarore.
