= Mokoia railway station =

Railway station in New Zealand

Mokoia

General information
- Location: Mokoia, South Taranaki; New Zealand
- Coordinates: 39°37′45.7″S 174°22′12.4″E
- Elevation: 68 m (223 ft)
- System: New Zealand Government Railways (NZGR); Regional rail
- Line: Marton–New Plymouth line
- Distance: 53 mi 53 ch (approx. 86.4 km) from New Plymouth
- Platforms: Single, right side

Construction
- Structure type: At-grade

History
- Opened: 23 March 1885; 141 years ago
- Closed: 11 December 1976; 49 years ago (all traffic)
Location
Notes
- Previous Station: Manutahi Station; Next station: Whareroa Station

Mokoia railway station was a railway station on the Marton–New Plymouth line in South Taranaki, New Zealand, serving the small farming settlement of Mokoia between Hāwera and Pātea for over ninety years, from its opening in 1885 until its closure to all traffic in 1976.

== History ==
=== Early years ===
Mokoia station opened on 23 March 1885, as part of the Wanganui–Patea Railway, the section of what later became the Marton–New Plymouth line running north from Wanganui. The Hawera Road Board consented to a deviation of the main road around the station in 1883, and the road was further realigned in 1885 using recycled metal from the works; a water supply was established at the station the same year, following land being set aside for an approach road in 1884.

A private siding was established for a Mr Lysaght following applications in 1886 and 1889, and Lysaght separately applied in 1889 to rent a portion of the goods shed. By 1886 the station was recorded at 52 miles 26 chains from Wanganui.

Facilities recorded at the station from the 1890s included an accommodation shelter shed, a passenger platform on the right side of the line, a cart approach to the platform, a goods shed (recorded variously as 30 by 40 feet and 40 by 30 feet), a loading bank, cattle and sheep yards, a water service, and urinals, served by a loop able to hold around 32 wagons and a 12-wagon backshunt.

By 1907, Mokoia was reported as the busiest flag station on the coast, its road traffic swollen by settlers from the neighbouring Meremere district using the road connecting to the station — a situation that had become a boundary dispute between Mokoia and Meremere ratepayers over responsibility for maintaining the road.

In 1913, the Member for Patea, G. V. Pearce, questioned the Minister of Railways in the House of Representatives on the lack of ladies' accommodation at Mokoia. The Minister replied that a shelter shed and goods shed were already provided and that accommodation was "reasonably sufficient" for the volume of traffic, adding that his enquiries showed no pressing urgency to incur further expenditure. Pearce declared himself dissatisfied with the reply, pointing out that the backcountry served by the station had been settled for thirty to forty miles inland since it was built, and that women and children travelling that distance had no ladies' waiting room at all.

=== 1911–1914 deviation ===
Between 1911 and 1914 the Railway Department carried out a major deviation of the line immediately south of Mokoia, as part of a wider scheme to ease grades and curves and reduce operating costs. The existing track climbed a winding 1-in-50 grade to the station; the new deviation, about 2.25 miles (3.62 km) long, eased the grade to 1-in-80, replaced a series of curves with a single easy curve, and shortened the route by 20 chains. Much of the new formation ran through deep cuttings excavated by the "tunnel method" — a drive cut through at rail level, with shafts sunk from the surface to meet it, before the cutting was progressively opened out from above — including one cutting requiring a tunnel 28 chains (0.56 km) long driven through papa rock at a depth of 50 feet (15 m). The scheme also included replacing the timber viaduct over the Manawapou River with a steel structure twenty feet higher.

An elderly workman named Wilson had his arm broken in a fall of earth during the deviation works in August 1911. In 1913, land at Mokoia was given up for road purposes to the Hawera County Council as part of the associated works.

Following the deviation, the station's goods shed loop capacity was recorded as 40 wagons, with a further 34 at the goods shed and a 6-wagon backshunt, and by 1943 the station's distance was recorded as 53 miles 53 chains from New Plymouth.

In 1917, the disused former goods shed at Mokoia — previously used as a social room — was approved for relocation to Ohau for use as a pump house.

=== Level crossing ===
The Mokoia level crossing was raised as a safety concern by the South Taranaki Automobile Association in 1933, alongside crossings at Normanby and Ngaere. At this point, South Road crossed the railway line at Mokoia Station, then followed the old railway line alignment towards the Whenuakura River. By 1935 the Main Highways Board had approved a deviation of the road to avoid the crossing, rerouting traffic along the original south road past the Mokoia store rather than crossing the line by the factory, making use of an existing overhead bridge, which was to be widened and strengthened.

=== Later years and closure ===
The station remained a busy point for wool and produce traffic into the 1930s. On 2 July 1926, tablet porter George Thomas Rollerson was killed on duty at the station, struck by the engine of an excursion train from Hawera; an inquest returned a verdict of accidental death, with no blame attached to anyone.

Mokoia station was closed to all traffic on 11 December 1976. Today, only the main line and a concrete block former goods shed remain.

== Manawapou Viaduct ==
The Manawapou Viaduct, rebuilt as part of the 1911–1914 deviation, crosses the Manawapou River a short distance from the former station site.

== See also ==
- Marton–New Plymouth line
- Manutahi railway station
- Whareroa railway station
