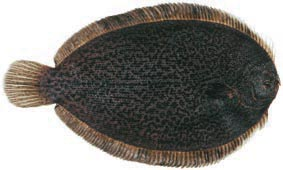

Scientific classification
- Kingdom: Animalia
- Phylum: Chordata
- Class: Actinopterygii
- Order: Carangiformes
- Suborder: Pleuronectoidei
- Family: Rhombosoleidae
- Genus: Colistium
- Species: C. guentheri

Binomial name
- Colistium guentheri (Hutton, 1873)

Synonyms
- Ammotretis guentheri Hutton, 1873

= New Zealand brill =

Species of fish

The New Zealand brill (Colistium guentheri; Māori: pātikinui) is an edible flatfish of the family Pleuronectidae. It is a demersal fish native to shallow seas around New Zealand, at depths of between 27 metres (89 ft) and 49 metres (161 ft). It can grow to 91 centimetres (36 in) in length and can weigh up to 1.8 kilograms (4.0 lb).

== Identification ==
The New Zealand brill is a righteyed flounder and so has both its eyes on the right-hand side of its body. Its upper surface is dark grey in colour, with its edges and fins almost black; the outer edge of each scale is black, which explains the longitudinal black lines that occur along the length of the body.
