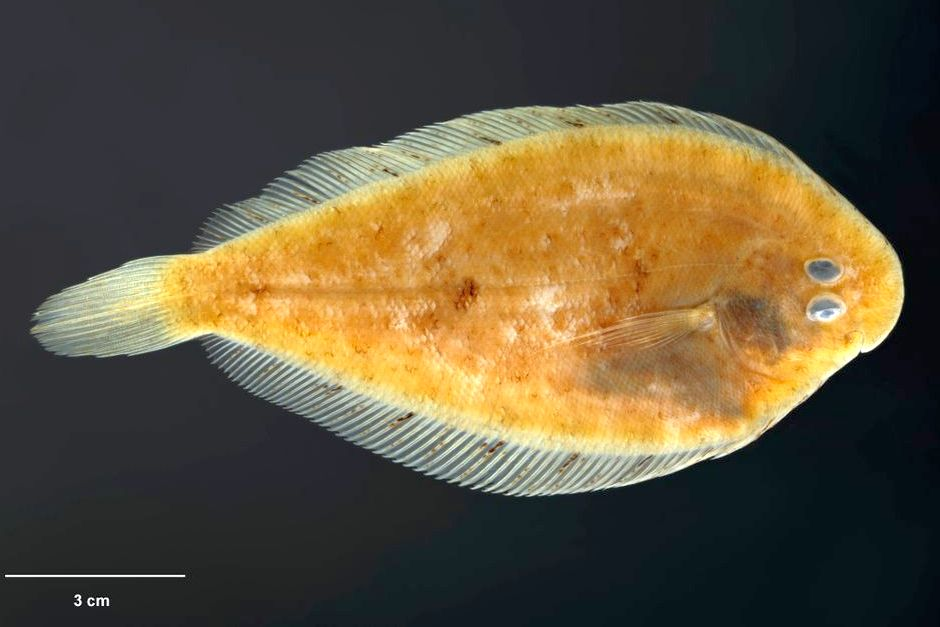

Scientific classification
- Kingdom: Animalia
- Phylum: Chordata
- Class: Actinopterygii
- Order: Carangiformes
- Suborder: Pleuronectoidei
- Family: Rhombosoleidae
- Genus: Peltorhamphus
- Species: P. latus

Binomial name
- Peltorhamphus latus G. D. James, 1972

= Speckled sole =

Species of fish

The speckled sole, Peltorhamphus latus, is a righteye flounder of the family Pleuronectidae, found around New Zealand and Norfolk Island in enclosed waters less than 55 m in depth. Their length is up to 17 cm.
