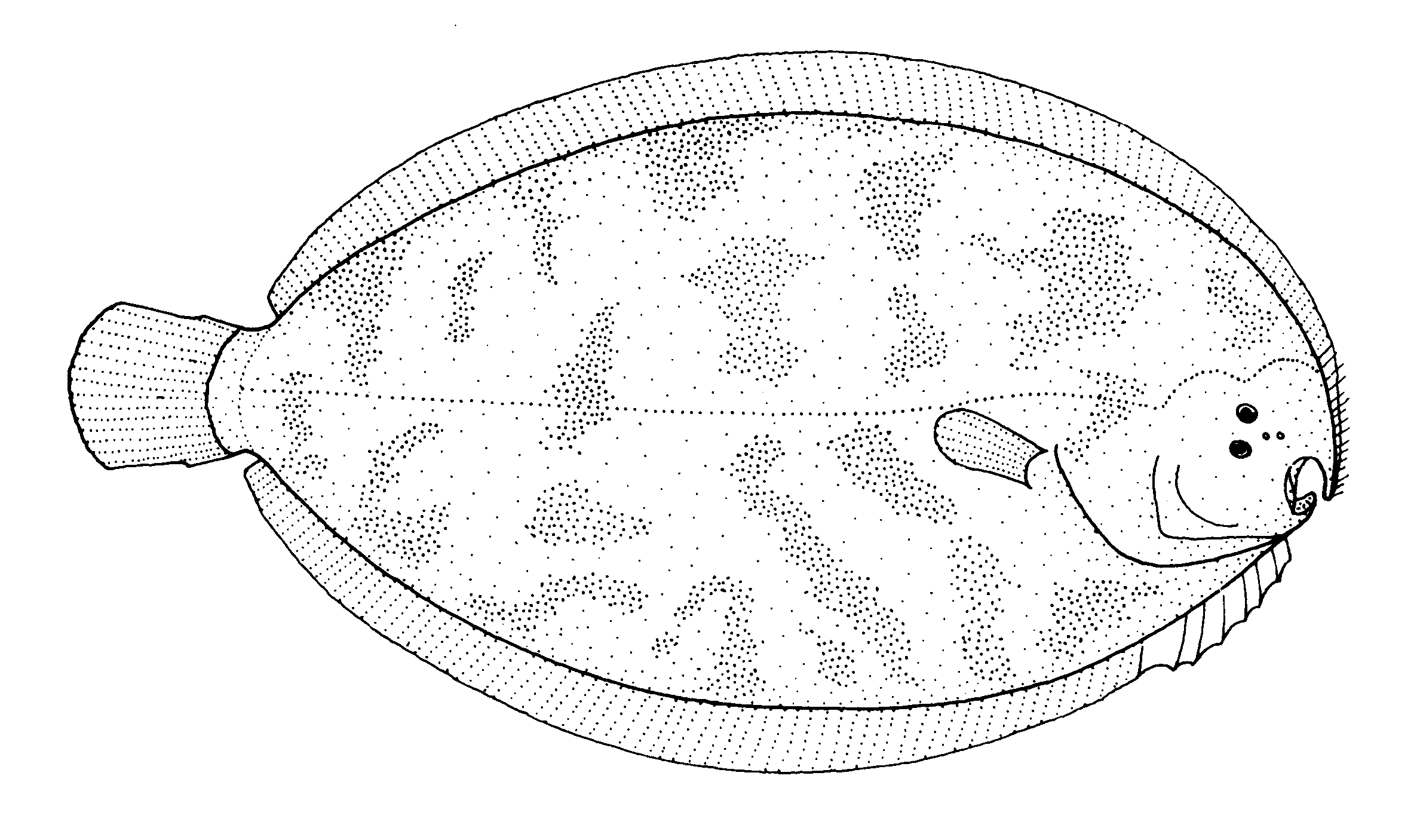
- Drawing by Dr Tony Ayling

Scientific classification
- Kingdom: Animalia
- Phylum: Chordata
- Class: Actinopterygii
- Order: Carangiformes
- Suborder: Pleuronectoidei
- Family: Rhombosoleidae
- Genus: Colistium
- Species: C. nudipinnis

Binomial name
- Colistium nudipinnis (Waite, 1911)

Synonyms
- Ammotretis nudipinnis Waite, 1911

= New Zealand turbot =

Species of fish

The New Zealand turbot (Colistium nudipinnis; Māori: pātiki) is a righteye flounder of the subfamily Rhombosoleinae in the family Pleuronectidae, found around New Zealand in shallow enclosed waters.

== Identification ==
Their length is from 25 to 90 cm, and they are the largest flounder in New Zealand. The body of the turbot is broad, even a small oval and flat, and their oval body is broader and thicker than other flounders. The overall size is richer than other gums and has a pointed little nose. There are many small black spots on the deep olive-green body. Some spots are from dark green to black, the abdomen is somewhat grayish, and there is a circle outside. The turbot has a small amount of thorns on its surface, and its dorsal fin is hard and long, extending from the tip of the nose, with short rays and almost to the back. Both sides of the body are heavily scaled with small, and scales are deeply embedded in thick skin (73-86 along the side lines), scales on both sides cover lots of ventral surfaces. Its caudal fin is relatively small, similar in shape to the dorsal fin, and extends from the dorsal fin to the caudal fin at the same level as the dorsal fin. The weight of the turbot is between 0.2 and 0.7 kilograms. Young turbot usually matures into large fish within 4–5 years, while female fish are larger than males, and the total age of a lifetime is about 15 years old.

== Distribution and habitat ==
Natural global range: NZ Turbot from New Zealand.

=== New Zealand range ===
Turbot is a marine species that spreads throughout New Zealand and requires a seawater environment between 8.5 and 77 meters deep on New Zealand's coastline and shallow waters, but mainly on the South Island, such as the West Coast, south of the Cook Strait.

=== Habitat preferences ===
Turbot is a marine species that spreads throughout New Zealand, but it is often found near the continental shelf in New Zealand. The habitat of the flounder is generally selected in shallow waters, bays., etc. It is rich in species on the west coast of the South Island and often appears in freshwater at a depth of about 30–90 meters. (McDowall, 1990). Young turbots gather in sheltered coastal waters such as estuaries, shoals and beaches, where they can survive for up to two years. Turbots also can be hidden by adjusting their body colors.

== * Life cycle ==
Younger turbots may gather in sheltered coastal waters such as estuaries, shoals and bays where they can survive for up to two years. Young turbots usually grow rapidly in the first three years of growth, and then growth begins to slow down significantly. The growth of turbot for more than five years is the slowest in the entire cycle. After investigation, it was found that the translucent and opaque areas will gradually form in the 5-10-year-old turbine. However, the analysis of the edge of the turbot for more than 10 years is inconclusive. Turbots grow faster and faster than other halibut, and their females are much faster and faster than males. At the same time, turbot has multiple ovulation ability during the breeding season, and its mating period peaks mainly from October to February, and may reach tens of thousands of eggs. Some eggs may float on the surface of the sea and then hatch after a few days.

== Diet / Prey / Predators ==
=== Diet and foraging ===
Young turbots prefer small invertebrates and benthic animals, such as molluscs and shrimps, and large adult turbots will feed on smaller fish than other flounders. Like to prey during the day, the reaction speed is also very fast. It mainly feeds on fish and shellfish. Their mating period lasts for several months in the summer, and hundreds of females lay eggs. The number of reproductions in winter is significantly reduced.

=== Predators and Diseases ===
Turbot is mainly harvested by seabirds and humans. Humans catch turbot to sell and eat. However, bacterial disease has become the most serious disease in turbot, such as Streptococcosis and Vibriosis. There is a high incidence of these diseases is in the summer or when the water temperature is low. Common symptoms are prominent eyeballs, then the eyes slowly become cloudy, and the body ulcerates and finally kills the host.
