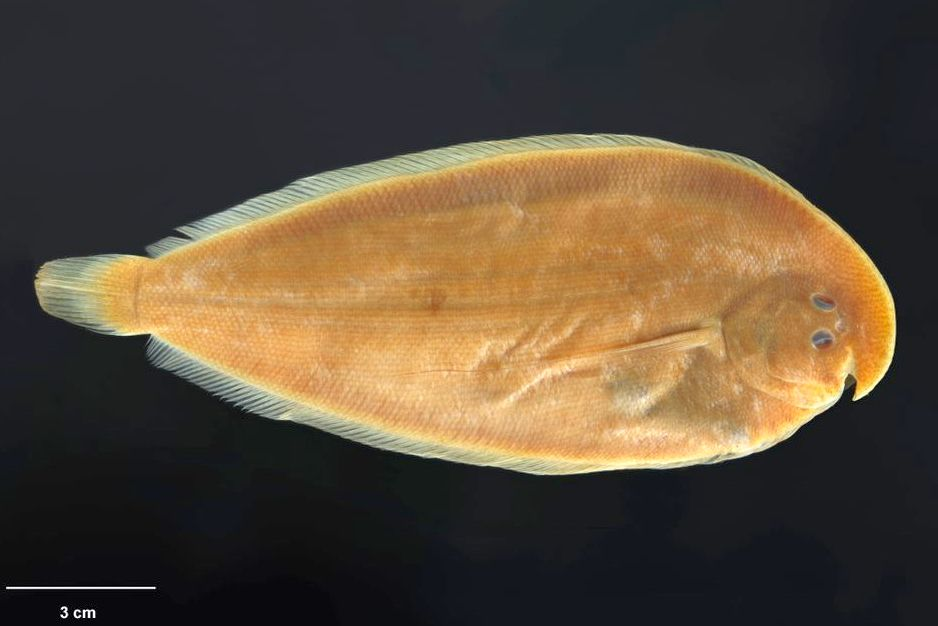

Scientific classification
- Kingdom: Animalia
- Phylum: Chordata
- Class: Actinopterygii
- Order: Carangiformes
- Suborder: Pleuronectoidei
- Family: Rhombosoleidae
- Genus: Peltorhamphus
- Species: P. tenuis

Binomial name
- Peltorhamphus tenuis G. D. James, 1972

= Peltorhamphus tenuis =

Species of fish

Peltorhamphus tenuis is a righteye flounder of the family Pleuronectidae, found only around New Zealand in enclosed waters less than 100 m in depth.
