= Tangahoe =

Tangahoe is a Māori word used for several related items in New Zealand:

- Tangahoe, Manawatu-Wanganui, a locality close to the Whanganui River, New Zealand
- Tangahoe (hapū) is a hapū (sept) of the Māori Ngāti Ruanui iwi (tribe)
- The Tangahoe River, in the western North Island of New Zealand
- The Tangahoe Formation, a geologic formation in the western North Island of New Zealand
