= Spotted flounder =

Spotted flounder is a common name for several fishes and may refer to:

- Ammotretis lituratus, native to the southern coast of Australia
- Azygopus pinnifasciatus, native to Australia and New Zealand
- Citharus linguatula, native to the eastern Atlantic Ocean and Mediterranean Sea
- Hippoglossina bollmani, native to the eastern Pacific Ocean
- Mancopsetta maculata, native to the Southern Ocean
