= Lake Rotokare =

Lake in the North Island of New Zealand

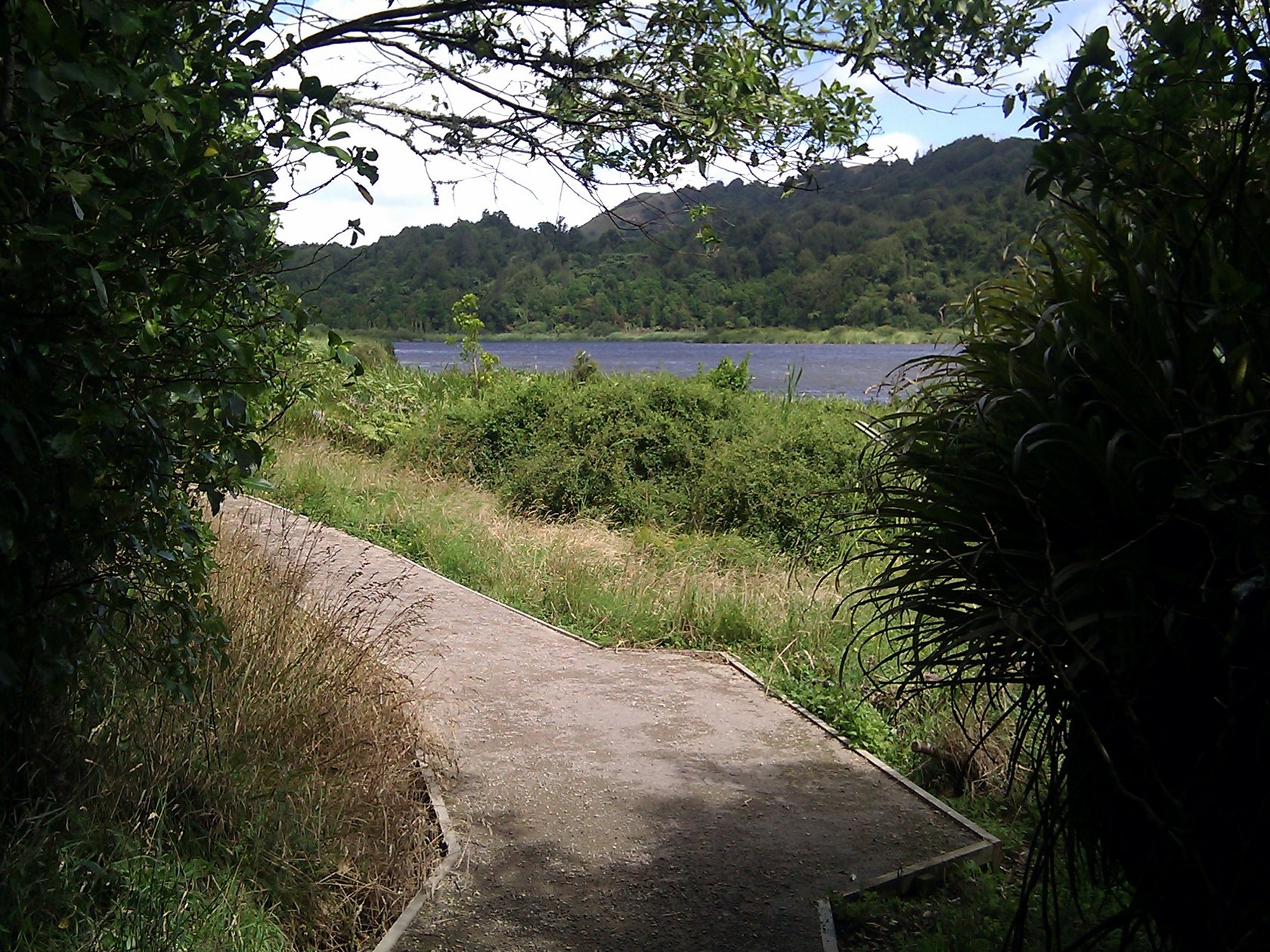
- Lake Rotokare

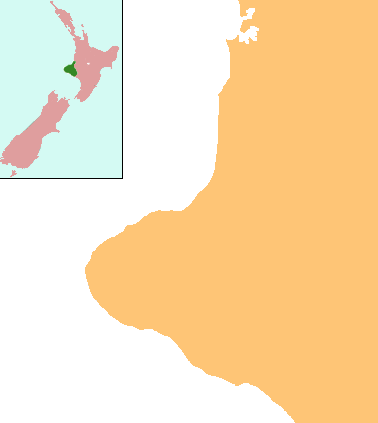
- Location within Taranaki Region
- Location: Taranaki, North Island
- Coordinates: 39.45°S 174.41°E
- Primary inflows: springs
- Primary outflows: Te Ararata Stream
- Basin countries: New Zealand
- Surface area: 17.8 ha (44 acres)
- Average depth: 6 m (20 ft)

Lake Rotokare is a landslide dammed lake in the New Zealand region of Taranaki. It is located 12 km (7.5 mi) east of Eltham, and is the largest extant remnant of the historic Ngaere swamp complex.

The 230 ha (570 acres) Scenic Reserve, in the Tangahoe catchment, is the country's largest wetland and lake habitat inside a predator proof fence. It is administered by South Taranaki District Council and Rotokare Scenic Reserve Trust. Species in the Reserve include raupō, harakeke, purei/makura, pukatea, kahikatea, coprosma, swamp maire, swamp millet, jointed baumea, Australasian bittern, spotless crake, fernbird, gold-striped gecko, banded kōkopu, koura, and short and longfin eels.

Lake Rotokare should not be confused with Barrett Lagoon near New Plymouth, which has the alternative Māori language name of Rotokare.

== History ==
The Reserve was created in the early 1870s. Road access was created in 1914. In 2008, the Rotokare Scenic Reserve Trust completed construction of a predator proof fence around the reserve.

== Reintroduction of native bird species ==
A number of bird species have been reintroduced into the reserve:

- Western Brown Kiwi (Apteryx mantelli) in 2012
- Tīeke/saddleback and pōpokatea/whitehead in May 2014.
- Hihi (Stitchbird) in 2017 with additional birds added to the population in 2018.
- Pāteke (Brown Teal) in May 2019.
- Titipounamu (Rifleman) in 2019
