= Derwent flounder =

Scientific classification
- Kingdom: Animalia
- Phylum: Chordata
- Class: Actinopterygii
- Order: Carangiformes
- Suborder: Pleuronectoidei
- Family: Rhombosoleidae
- Genus: Taratretis; Last, 1978
- Species: T. derwentensis

Binomial name
- Taratretis derwentensis Last, 1978

Species of fish

The Derwent flounder (Taratretis derwentensis) is a flatfish of the family Pleuronectidae. It is a demersal fish that lives on sand and mud bottoms in shallow coastal waters, at depths of between 3 and 50 metres (9.8 and 164.0 ft). Its native habitat is the south-western Pacific, particularly the south-east coast of Australia, from New South Wales to South Australia and Tasmania. It grows to at least 9 centimetres (3.5 in) in length, and can reach up to 12 centimetres (4.7 in).

== Commercial fishing ==
Although the Derwent flounder is listed as a minor component of the Tasmanian commercial flounder catch, its small size makes it undesirable, and any bycatch would probably be discarded. It is also recorded as bycatch in prawn trawling in South Australia.
