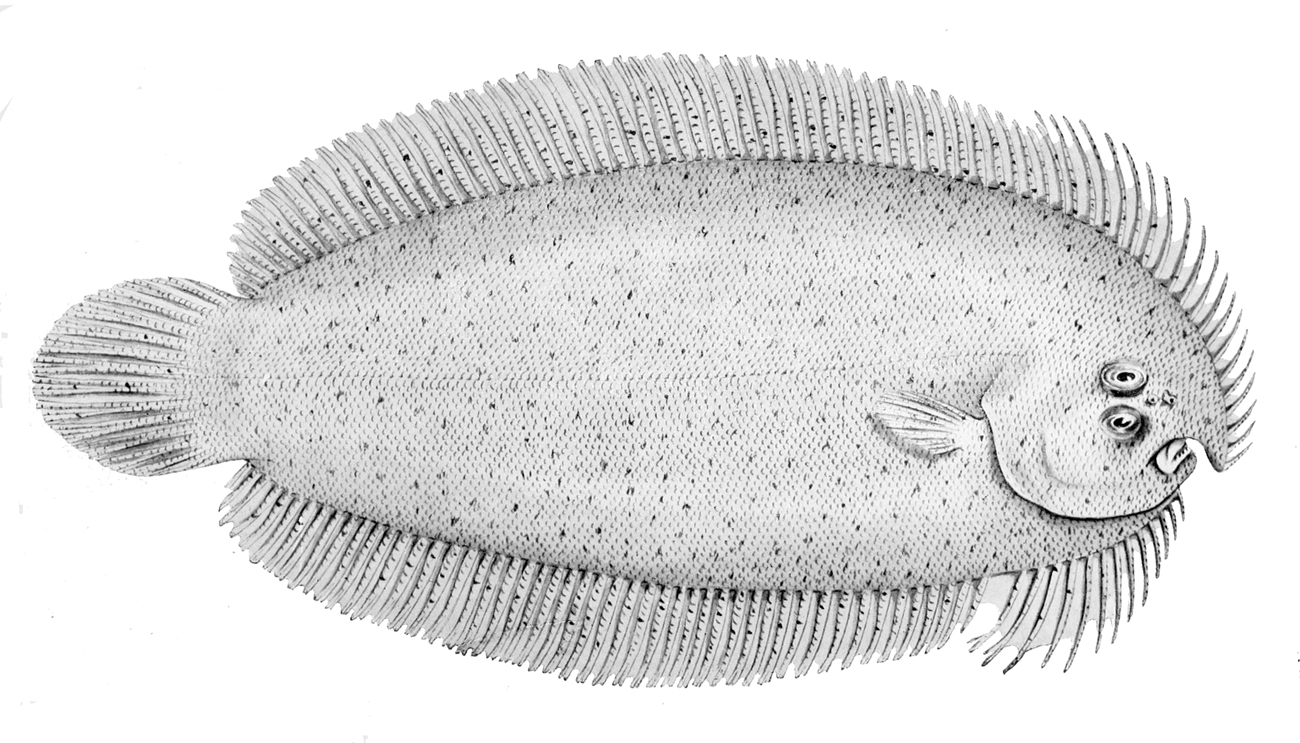
- Elongate Flounder (A. elongatus)

Scientific classification
- Domain: Eukaryota
- Kingdom: Animalia
- Phylum: Chordata
- Class: Actinopterygii
- Order: Carangiformes
- Suborder: Pleuronectoidei
- Family: Pleuronectidae
- Subfamily: Rhombosoleinae
- Genus: Ammotretis; Günther, 1862

Type species
- Ammotretis rostratus Günther 1862

= Ammotretis =

Genus of fishes

Ammotretis is a genus of righteye flounders native to the coastal waters off southern Australia.

== Species ==
There are currently five recognized species in this genus:

- Ammotretis brevipinnis Norman, 1926 (Shortfin flounder)
- Ammotretis elongatus McCulloch, 1914 (Elongate flounder)
- Ammotretis lituratus (J. Richardson, 1844) (Tudor's flounder)
- Ammotretis macrolepis McCulloch, 1914
- Ammotretis rostratus Günther, 1862 (Longsnout flounder)
