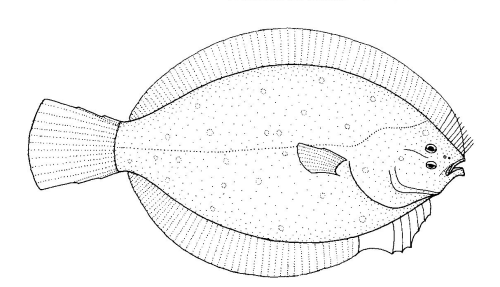
- Black Flounder (R. retiaria), drawing by Dr Tony Ayling

Scientific classification
- Domain: Eukaryota
- Kingdom: Animalia
- Phylum: Chordata
- Class: Actinopterygii
- Order: Carangiformes
- Suborder: Pleuronectoidei
- Family: Rhombosoleidae
- Genus: Rhombosolea; Günther, 1862

Type species
- Rhombosolea monopus Günther 1862

= Rhombosolea =

Genus of fishes

Rhombosolea is a genus of righteye flounders. The four species in this genus can be found in the waters around New Zealand and southern Australia.

== Species ==
There are currently four recognized species in this genus:

- Rhombosolea leporina Günther, 1862 (Yellowbelly flounder)
- Rhombosolea plebeia (Richardson, 1843) (Sand flounder)
- Rhombosolea retiaria Hutton, 1874 (Black flounder)
- Rhombosolea tapirina Günther, 1862 (Greenback flounder)
