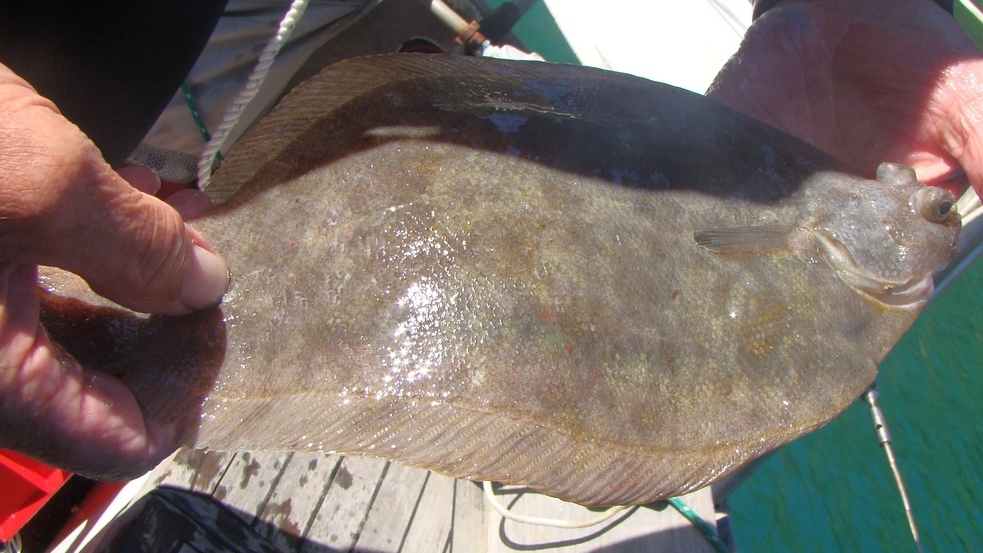
- Southern lemon sole

Conservation status
- Least Concern (IUCN 3.1)

Scientific classification
- Kingdom: Animalia
- Phylum: Chordata
- Class: Actinopterygii
- Order: Carangiformes
- Suborder: Pleuronectoidei
- Family: Rhombosoleidae
- Genus: Pelotretis
- Species: P. flavilatus

Binomial name
- Pelotretis flavilatus Waite, 1911

= Southern lemon sole =

Southern lemon sole Temporal range: Late Pliocene–present

Species of fish

The southern lemon sole (Pelotretis flavilatus; Māori: pātiki), also known as the New Zealand lemon sole, is a righteye flounder, the only species in the genus Pelotretis, found around New Zealand in enclosed waters such as estuaries, harbours, mudflats, and sandflats, in waters less than 385 m in depth. Their length is from 25 to 50 cm.

A fossil specimen tentatively assigned to this species is known from the Late Pliocene-aged Titiokura Formation of the North Island.
