= Tangahoe River =

River in New Zealand

Coordinates: 39°39′S 174°21′E

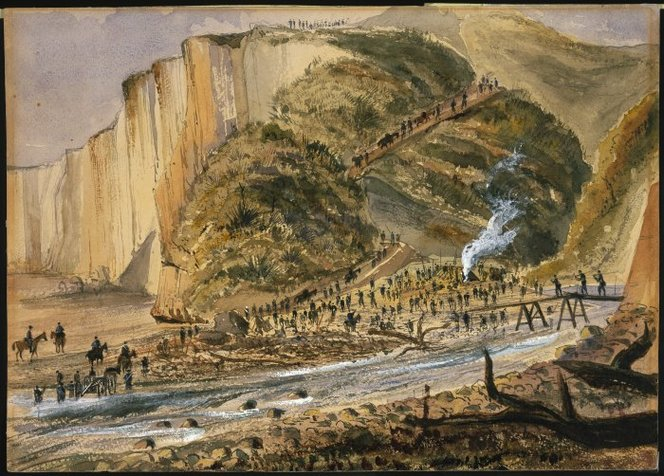
- 1865 painting of soldiers crossing the river at the beach during the Second Taranaki War

Location
- Country: New Zealand

Physical characteristics
- Source
  - elevation: 256 m (840 ft)
- Mouth
  - location: South Taranaki Bight
- Length: 27 km (17 mi)
- Basin size: 297.6 km^{2} (114.9 sq mi)
- Discharge
  - average: 4.2 m^{3}/s (150 cu ft/s)

The Tangahoe River is a river of the Taranaki Region of New Zealand's North Island. It flows generally southwest from its origins in hill country to the east of Lake Rotorangi, reaching the Tasman Sea in the South Taranaki Bight 5 km (3.1 mi) southeast of Hāwera.

== Name ==
An elder, of Tangahoe and Ngāti Hine descent, said the origin of the name, Tangahoe, is that it was given to the river following the loss of a steering oar (hoe) from a fishing waka (boat) at sea, trying to return to its tauranga waka (landing place). It was said that, had it had two steering oars, as on the Aotea waka, then it would have reached its landing.

== Pre colonial value ==
The Ngāti Ruanui Claims Settlement Act 2003 said the river was a major source of resources, providing shellfish and fish, including piharau, kōkopu, tuna and pātiki, birds such as kererū, pūkeko, tiwaiwaka, kāhu, kākāpō, kiwi, korimako, miromiro and pīpīwharauroa and plants, including koromiko, kōhia, hinau, piripiri, mamaku, and rewarewa.

== Defensive sites ==
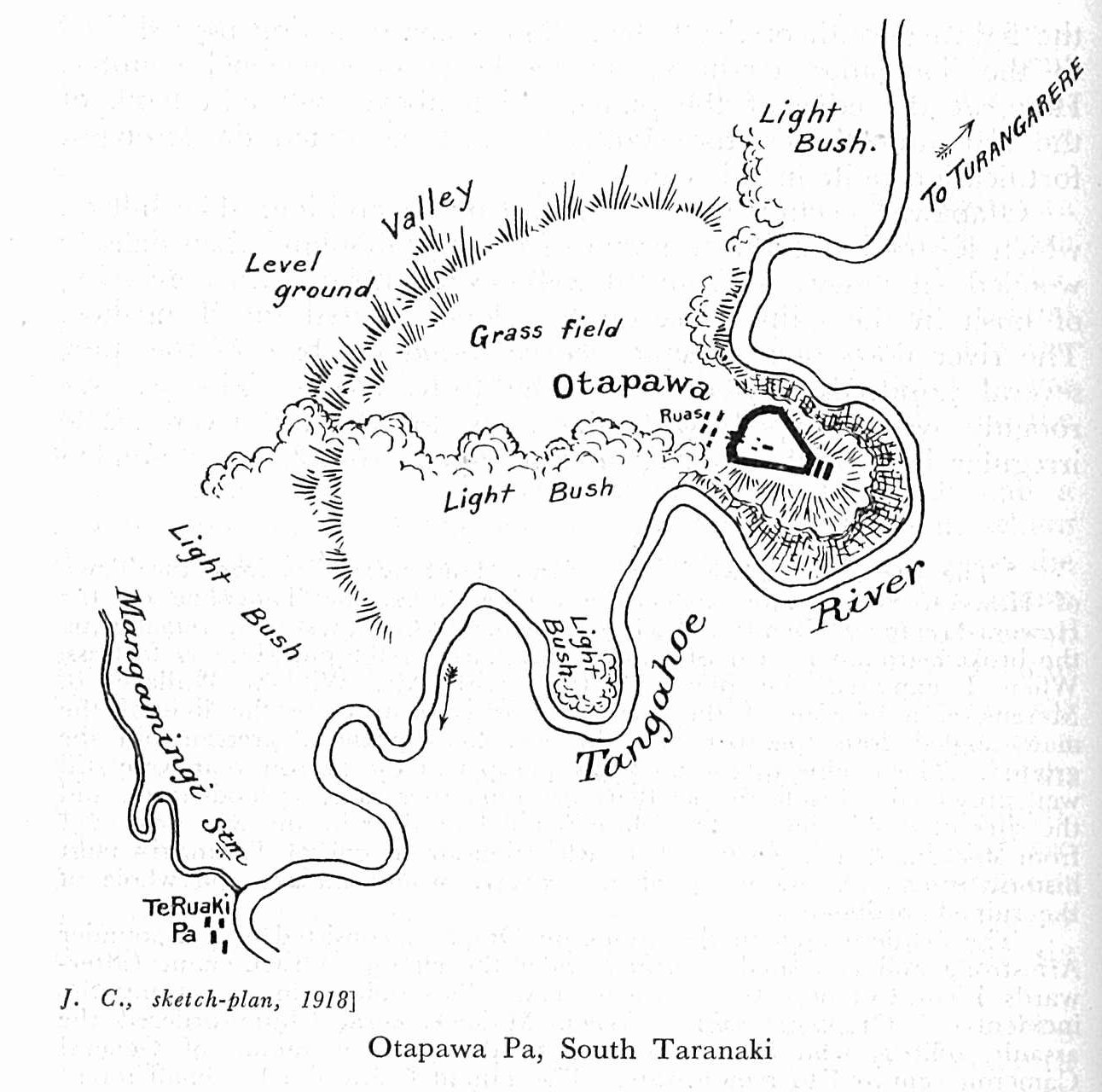
Otapawa pa, attacked in 1866

The steep valley sides of the lower river provided good defensive sites, as marked on the 1:50,000 map.

Otapawa pā was held by Tangahoe, Pakakohi and Ngāti Ruanui when it was attacked on 16 January 1866, during the Second Taranaki War. The account of the attack in 'The adventures of Kimble Bent' put Māori losses at 7, but others estimated 30 killed and 30 wounded. The Imperial troops lost 11 dead and 10 wounded. A bulldozer has destroyed most of the site.

Te Ruaki Pa has also been damaged - by cattle.

Tangahoe and Inman's Redoubts date from 17 March 1865. They remain in good condition under pasture.

== Geology ==
The river rises on a sandy mid-Pliocene Tangahoe Mudstone, formed in a shallow sea, then its valley is cut down to early-Pliocene Whenuakura Group rocks (bioclastic limestone, pebbly and micaceous sandstones and massive siltstone), whilst the surrounding land is covered by mid-Pleistocene beach deposits of conglomerate, sand, peat and clay. The river carries about 43,900 tonnes of sediment to the sea each year. It enters the sea between 30 and 50 m tall cliffs, eroded over the last 15,000 years, following tectonic uplift. Of the rivers flowing into the S Taranaki Bight, the Tangahoe ranks 13th for flow but 9th for sediment input, with a sediment rate of 1.39 kg/s.

== Water quality ==
Water quality in Taranaki has been under pressure. Quality varies over the length of the river, as shown in the table -

Site	MCI	Taxonomic richness	EPT
150m up from Patete Stream	good	24.5	41.5%
Tangahoe Valley Rd bridge	good	25.5	49%
90m down from rail viaduct	fair	20	40%

In the summer of 2016 the MCI level at the viaduct was the lowest ever, probably due to earthworks by Fonterra, causing the rating to drop to poor. Tangahoe is listed 5th in Taranaki for modification, with 2.27 km (1.41 mi) of consented stream modification in its catchment. Fonterra's Whareroa dairy has a consent to draw 30,000,000 L (6,600,000 imp gal) of water a day from the Tangahoe's tributary, the Tawhiti Stream, where flows, temperature, etc. are recorded at both Tawhiti Rd and Whareroa. 1,741,050 L (382,980 imp gal) is also consented for irrigation. The dairy removes silt from the water with plastic microbeads.

== Tunnel ==
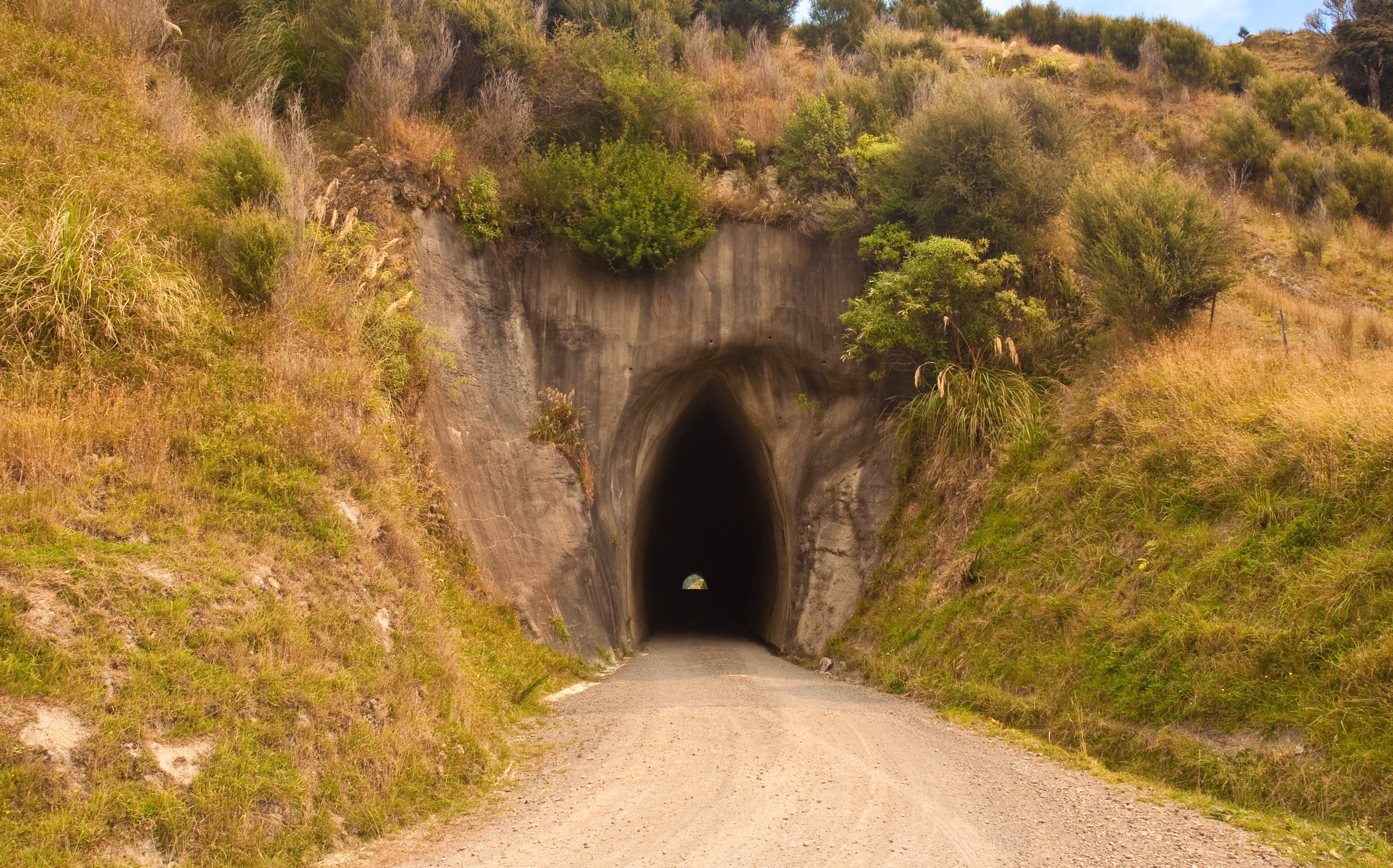
Eastern portal

Tangahoe Valley Tunnel runs under the ridge separating Pukekino Rd (leading to Lake Rotorangi) from the Tangahoe Valley. The 160 m (520 ft) tunnel was built in 1928. Digging was from both ends and didn't quite meet in the middle, hence a variation in the roof height in the centre.

In 1954 shotcrete was sprayed to consolidate the walls.

In 1986 part of the roof collapsed in an earthquake and the tunnel was closed. A deep and unstable cutting alongside, which proved to be often unpassable, served for traffic until, in 1996, South Taranaki District Council decided to reopen the tunnel, which re-opened in 1997, at a cost of $245,000.

In 2003 further restoration work was required, costing $250,000 to remove 25,000 m^{3} (33,000 yd^{3}) in the tunnel approaches, a further 10,000 m^{3} (13,000 yd^{3}) to reach the portal and add 1,000 m (1,100 yd) of rock bolts. Further repairs were done in 2009.

== Bridges ==
Tangahoe Valley Rd crosses the river on a 24.2 m (79 ft) through arch bridge which replaced one destroyed by floods in 1937, the new bridge being 2.4 m (7.9 ft) above the highest recorded flood level. The road was surveyed in 1898, money had been spent by 1900 and the road needed repair after floods in 1903, when £500 was voted for a bridge. A bridge was built in 1920 and the road gradually extended up the valley, with money still being voted in 1924.

Ohangai Rd crosses the river on a single lane bridge. The road was mentioned in 1877 and the bridge was old enough to need repairs by 1919. A new bridge was built in 1920.

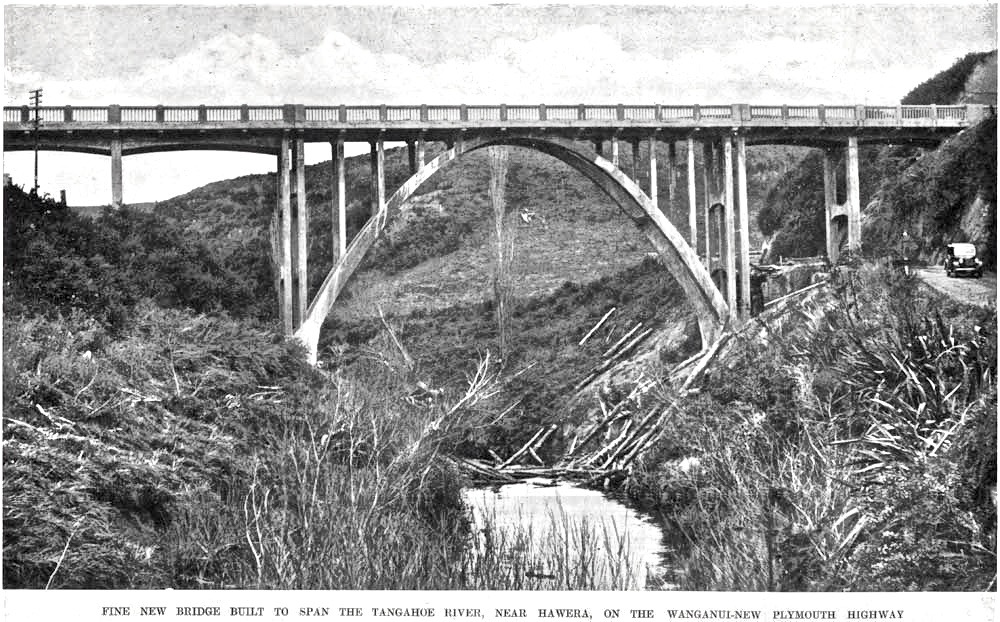
The road to the 1871 bridge is visible on the right

State Highway 3 crosses the river on a 65.5 m (215 ft) bridge. Until 1871 the route was via Manawapou Rd and the beach at low tide. A bridge was built in 1871 and replaced in 1887. The bridge was swept away by a flood on 22 February 1935 and temporarily replaced. Relief work to replace it and its winding route had already started in 1933 and was completed in 1936 at a cost of £6,000. It was widened from 6 m (20 ft) to 7.5 m (25 ft) in 2008. There were 7 crashes in the 4 years prior to widening.

The New Plymouth railway crosses the river about a kilometre downstream from SH3, on a 9-span trestle bridge 67 m (220 ft) long, the centre span being 18 m (60 ft), and the 4 each side of 3.0 m (10 ft) to 12 m (40 ft). The smaller spans are on piles driven into the rock, but the centre piers are concrete 5.5 m (18 ft) deep. The bridge was of totara 24 m (80 ft) above the river, or 20 m (65 ft) above flood level. A tender was accepted for a rebuild in 1910.

== See also ==
- List of rivers of New Zealand
- Lake Rotokare on the Te Ararata Stream tributary
