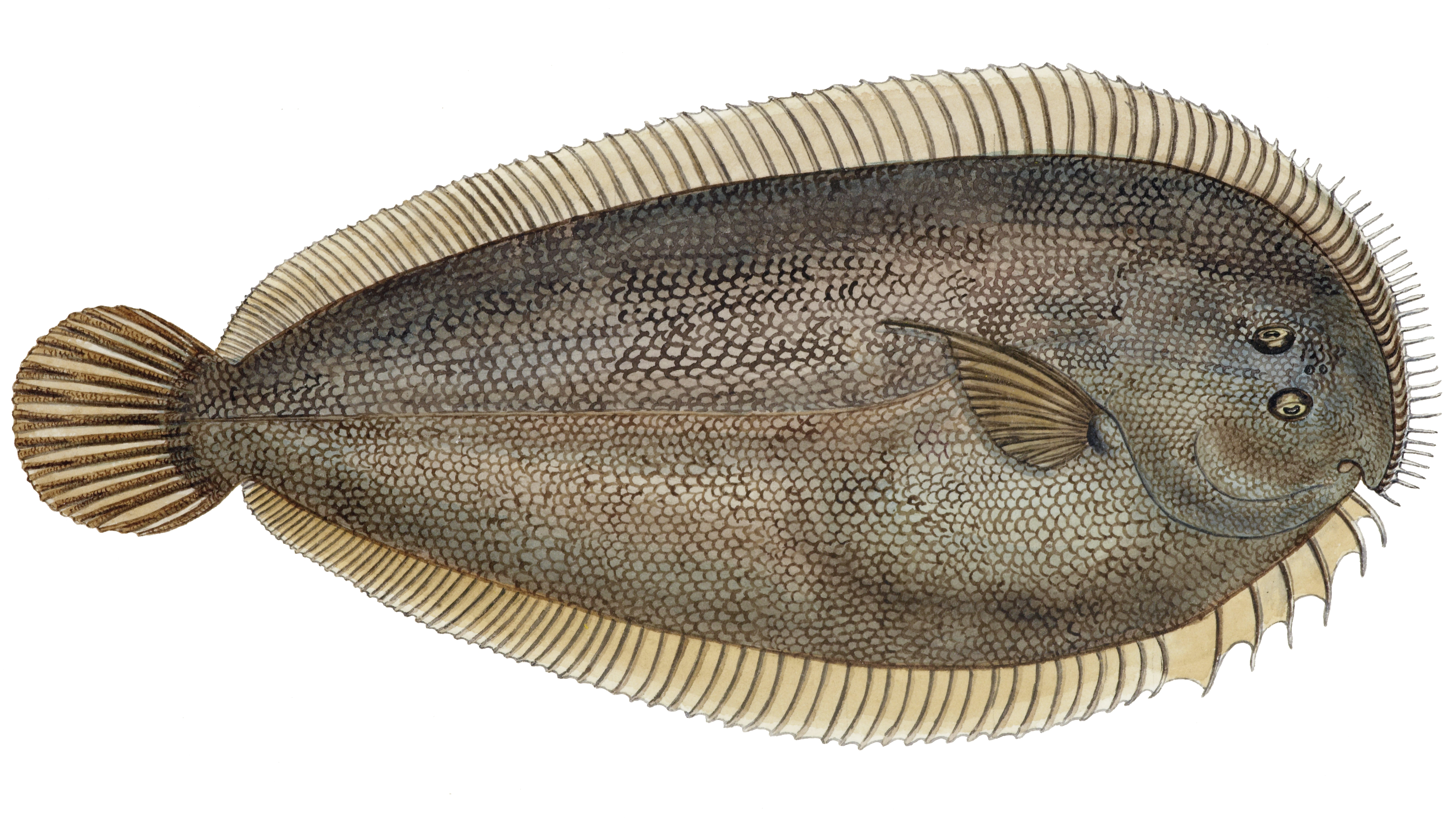
- Peltorhamphus novaezeelandiae

Scientific classification
- Domain: Eukaryota
- Kingdom: Animalia
- Phylum: Chordata
- Class: Actinopterygii
- Order: Carangiformes
- Suborder: Pleuronectoidei
- Family: Pleuronectidae
- Subfamily: Rhombosoleinae
- Genus: Peltorhamphus; Günther, 1862

Type species
- Peltorhamphus novaezeelandiae Günther, 1862

Species
- 4, see text.

= Peltorhamphus =

Genus of fishes

Peltorhamphus is a genus of righteye flounders native to the southwest Pacific Ocean around New Zealand and Norfolk Island (Australia).

== Species ==
There are currently four recognized species in this genus:

- Peltorhamphus kryptostomus Munroe, 2021
- Peltorhamphus latus G. D. James, 1972 (Speckled sole)
- Peltorhamphus novaezeelandiae Günther, 1862 (New Zealand sole)
- Peltorhamphus tenuis G. D. James, 1972
