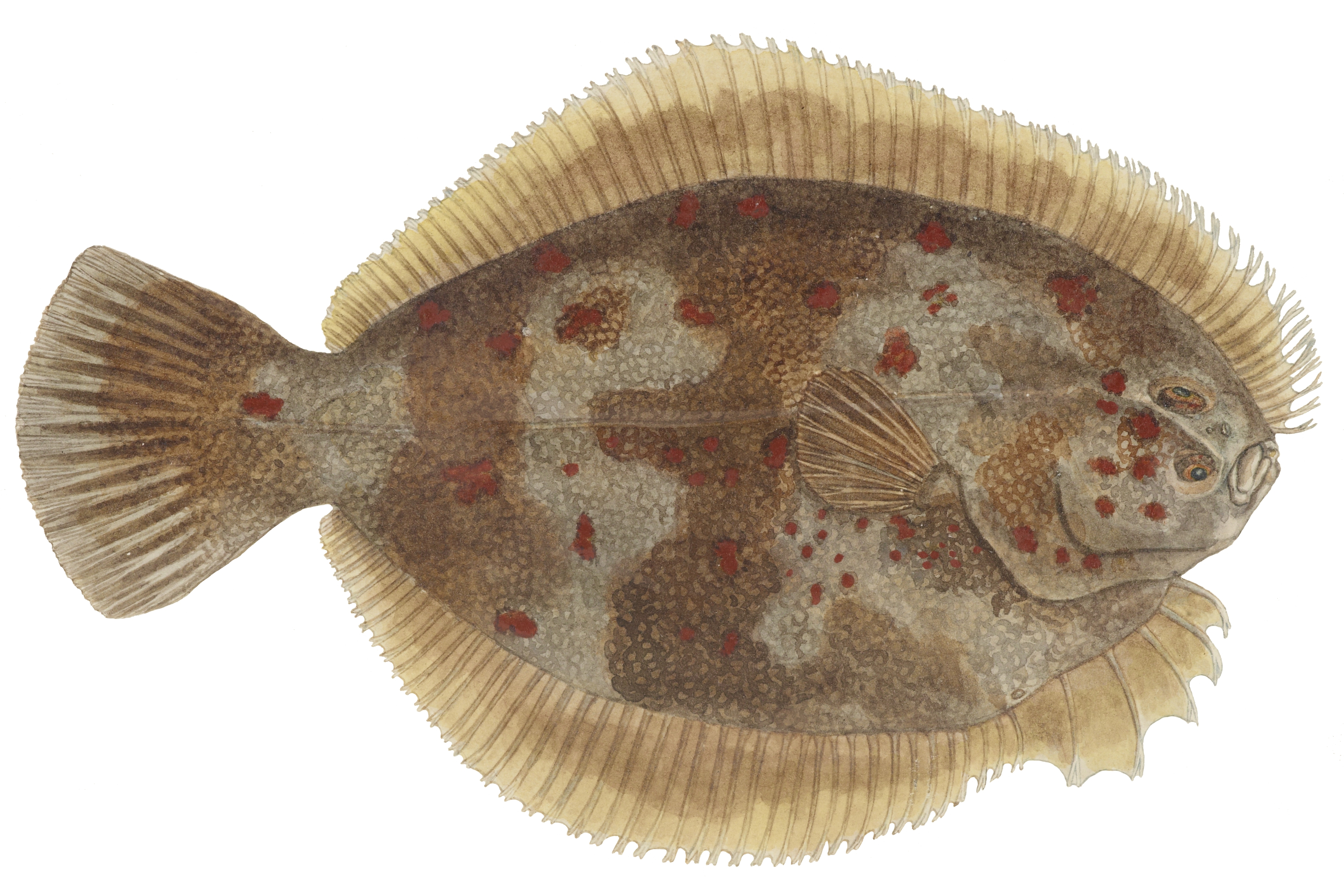

Conservation status
- Data Deficient (IUCN 3.1)

Scientific classification
- Kingdom: Animalia
- Phylum: Chordata
- Class: Actinopterygii
- Order: Carangiformes
- Suborder: Pleuronectoidei
- Family: Rhombosoleidae
- Genus: Rhombosolea
- Species: R. retiaria

Binomial name
- Rhombosolea retiaria Hutton, 1873
- Approximate known distribution of the black flounder on a map of New Zealand

Synonyms
- Rhombosolea (Adamasoma) retiaria adamas Whitley & Phillipps, 1939

= Black flounder =

Species of fish

The black flounder (Rhombosolea retiaria), also known by the Māori language name mohoao, is a species of flatfish in the family Rhombosoleidae, found around New Zealand in shallow enclosed waters and coastal freshwater lakes. Its adult length ranges from 20 to 45 cm (7.9 to 17.7 in).

== Description ==
Rhombosolea retiaria is known for its black back and orange spots.

== Habitat ==
Rhombosolea retiaria is the only species of flounder in New Zealand that can thrive in freshwater. It can be found in streams as far as 100 kilometres (62 mi) inland from the ocean.
