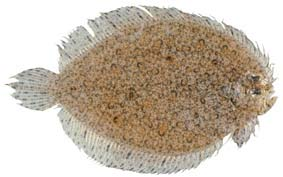

Scientific classification
- Kingdom: Animalia
- Phylum: Chordata
- Class: Actinopterygii
- Division: Teleostei
- Order: Carangiformes
- Suborder: Pleuronectoidei
- Family: Rhombosoleidae
- Genus: Psammodiscus; Günther, 1862
- Species: P. ocellatus

Binomial name
- Psammodiscus ocellatus Günther, 1862

= Indonesian ocellated flounder =

Species of fish

The Indonesian ocellated flounder, Psammodiscus ocellatus, is an edible flatfish of the family Pleuronectidae. It is a demersal fish that lives on sandy bottoms in the eastern Indian Ocean, particularly Indonesia and northwestern Australia. It can reach 15 centimetres (5.9 in) in length.
