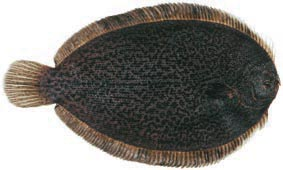
- C. guntheri
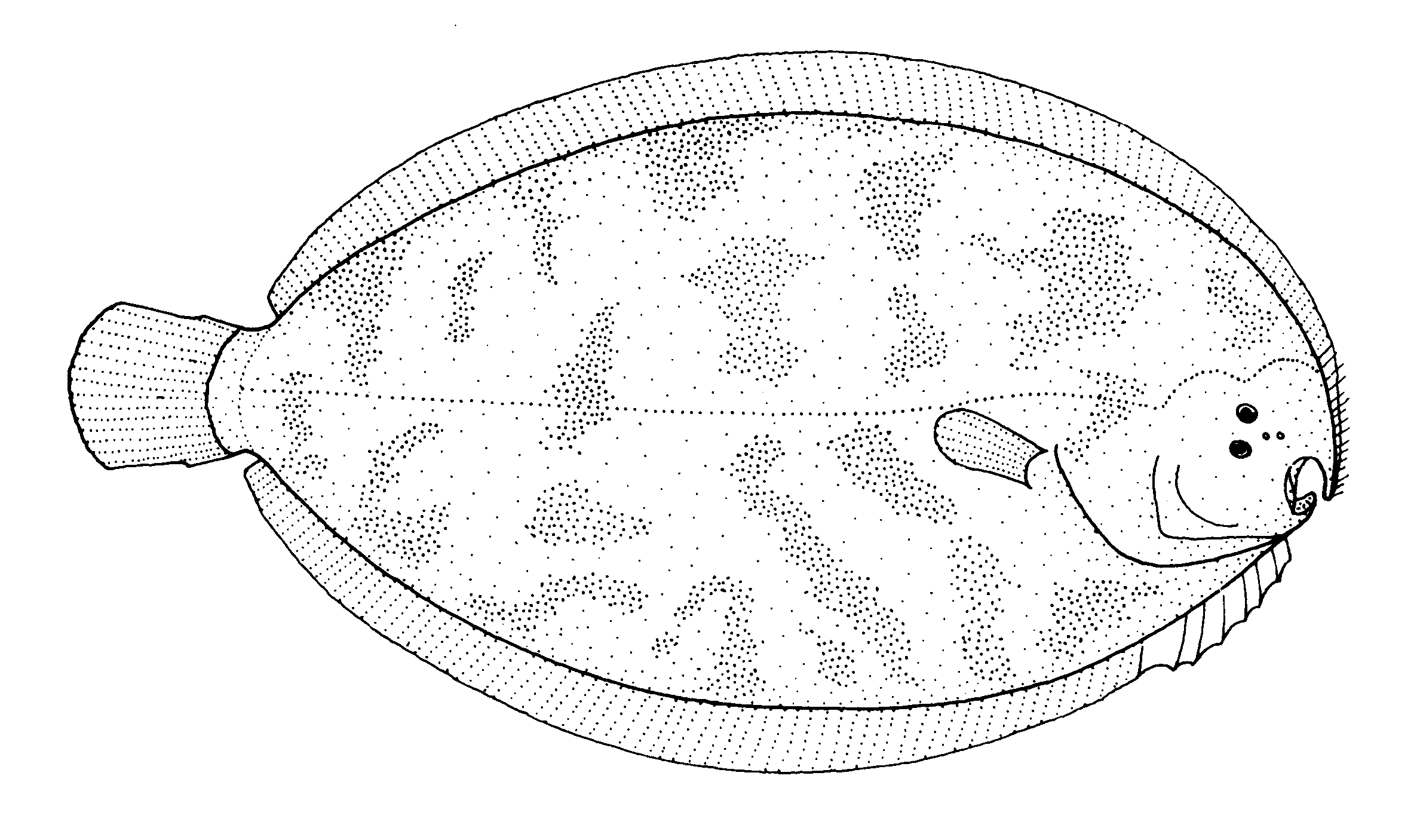
- C. nudipinnis

Scientific classification
- Kingdom: Animalia
- Phylum: Chordata
- Class: Actinopterygii
- Order: Carangiformes
- Suborder: Pleuronectoidei
- Family: Rhombosoleidae
- Genus: Colistium; Norman, 1926

Type species
- Ammotretis nudipinnis Waite, 1911

= Colistium =

Genus of fishes

Colistium is a genus of righteye flounders native to the southwest Pacific Ocean, where they occur around New Zealand. Both the species reach a length of about 90 cm (3 ft).

== Species ==
There are currently two recognized species in this genus:

- Colistium guntheri (Hutton, 1873) (New Zealand brill)
- Colistium nudipinnis (Waite, 1911) (New Zealand turbot)
