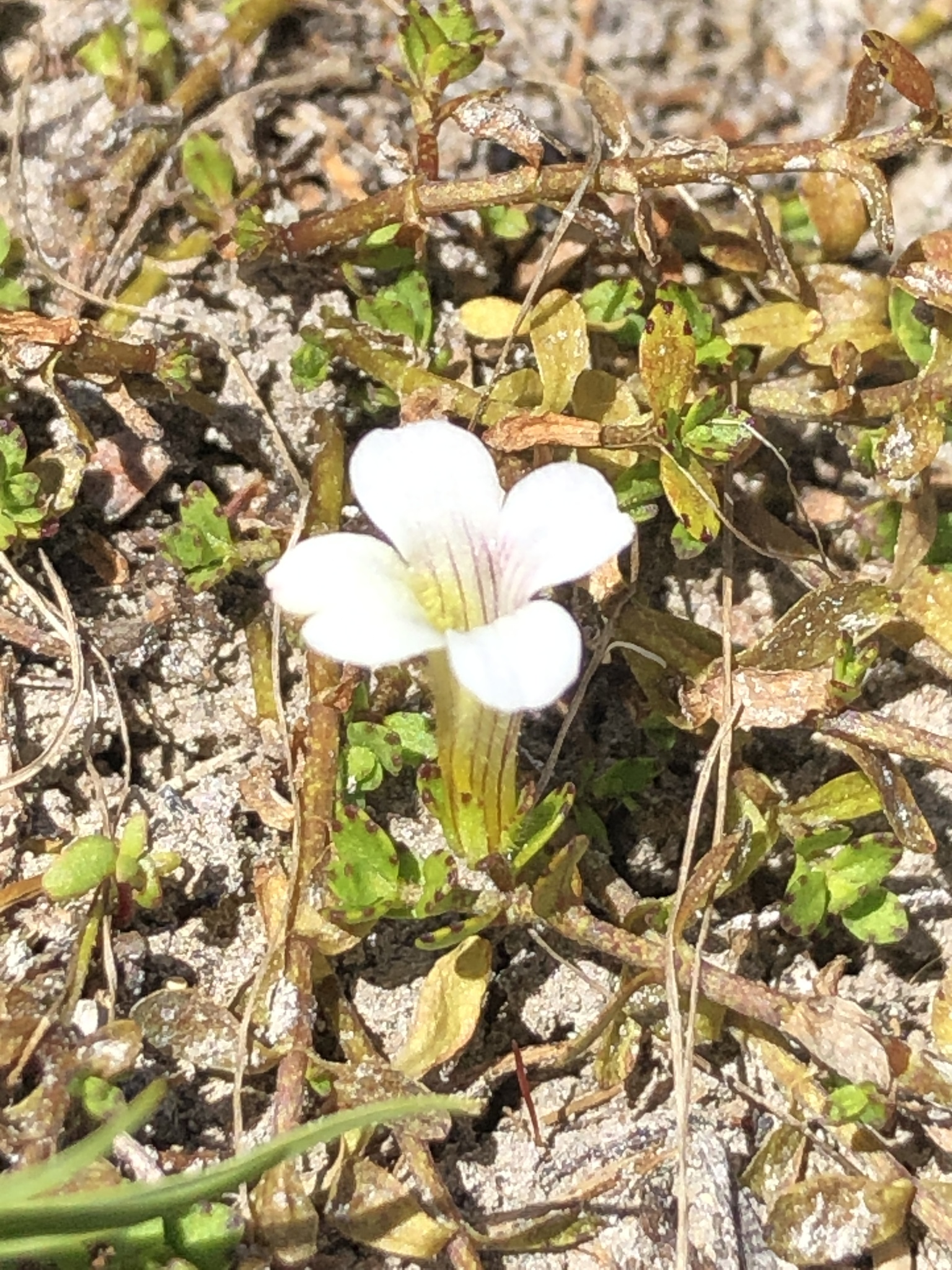
- Gratiola concinna in Nelson Lakes National Park

Conservation status
- Nationally Vulnerable (NZ TCS)

Scientific classification
- Kingdom: Plantae
- Clade: Embryophytes
- Clade: Tracheophytes
- Clade: Angiosperms
- Clade: Eudicots
- Clade: Asterids
- Order: Lamiales
- Family: Plantaginaceae
- Genus: Gratiola
- Species: G. concinna

Binomial name
- Gratiola concinna Colenso

= Gratiola concinna =

Species of flowering plant

Gratiola concinna is a species of flower from New Zealand.

== Description ==
A prostrate shrub with a small white flower.
