= Water quality in Taranaki =

Water quality in Taranaki is a notable environmental issue for many stakeholders with concerns about the potential impact from dairy farming in New Zealand and petrochemical industries.

Water resources in Taranaki are under the jurisdiction of the Taranaki Regional Council (TRC) under the Resource Management Act (RMA), and discharges to water require a resource consent. The TRC monitors waterway quality and publishes update reports.

Nationally, deterioration in freshwater quality has been associated with increases in dairy cattle numbers and in use of nitrogen fertiliser. TRC advise that dairying had not increased in Taranaki since 2000 and water quality is good and getting better. In 2015, the dairy cow population was 493,361, a 2.5% increase on 1998/99, with density of 2.85 cows per hectare (2.8 in 1998/99).

A review by Fish & Game and Forest & Bird found that many measures intended to control pollutants from dairying had not been implemented. In Taranaki, there are 1400 dairy sheds where the dairy effluent drains into streams instead of being sprayed to land, according to data from Taranaki Regional Council's 2012 State of the Environment report. In 2012, the president of the New Zealand Freshwater Sciences Society expressed surprise at the number of consented dairy discharges to streams, given most other regional councils prosecute dairy farmers who allow dairy effluent to enter waterways.

In 2019, Taranaki Regional Council reported that freshwater quality had deteriorated further, with only two of the fifteen sites tested meeting the standards for swimmability.

Instances of high levels of E.coli have been reported during summer periods.

== Water quality measurements ==
The following table shows average of measurements over the period 2005 to 2014.

Parameter	Taranaki	New Zealand	Comment
Total nitrogen, g/m^{3}	0.95	1.17	All organic and inorganic forms of nitrogen. Nitrogen can cause algal blooms.
Phosphorus, g/m^{3}	0.062	0.065	All forms of phosphorus, dissolved and particulate, organic and inorganic. Can come from waste water or agricultural run-off and can cause eutrophication.
Sediment, m	2.06	2.02	Black disc parameter measures water clarity. A larger number means the water has greater clarity.
E.coli, CFU/100ml	897	1,125	Escherichia coli is a common type of bacteria. High concentrations (>550) indicate faecal contamination which can be harmful to humans.
Sites	11	838	Count of the number of water monitoring sites.
Monitoring density, km^{2}/site	659	320	Taranaki has relatively few monitoring sites on a per km^{2} basis.

=== Graphs, 2005–2014 ===
Graphs of Taranaki water parameters, 2005–2014
Graph of Taranaki water clarity, 2005–2014

Graph of Taranaki E.coli measurements, 2005–2014

Graph of Taranaki water nitrogen measurements, 2005–2014

Graph of Taranaki water phosphorus measurements, 2005–2014
Data from 838 monitoring sites across New Zealand

== See also ==
- Water pollution in New Zealand
