= Banded-fin flounder =

Scientific classification
- Kingdom: Animalia
- Phylum: Chordata
- Class: Actinopterygii
- Order: Carangiformes
- Suborder: Pleuronectoidei
- Family: Rhombosoleidae
- Genus: Azygopus; Norman, 1926
- Species: A. pinnifasciatus

Binomial name
- Azygopus pinnifasciatus Norman, 1926

Species of fish

The banded-fin flounder or spotted flounder, Azygopus pinnifasciatus, is a righteye flounder and the only species in the genus Azygopus. It is found off southern Australia and New Zealand, on the continental slope at depths of between 120 and 900 m (390 and 2,950 ft). Its length is up to 20 cm (7.9 in).
