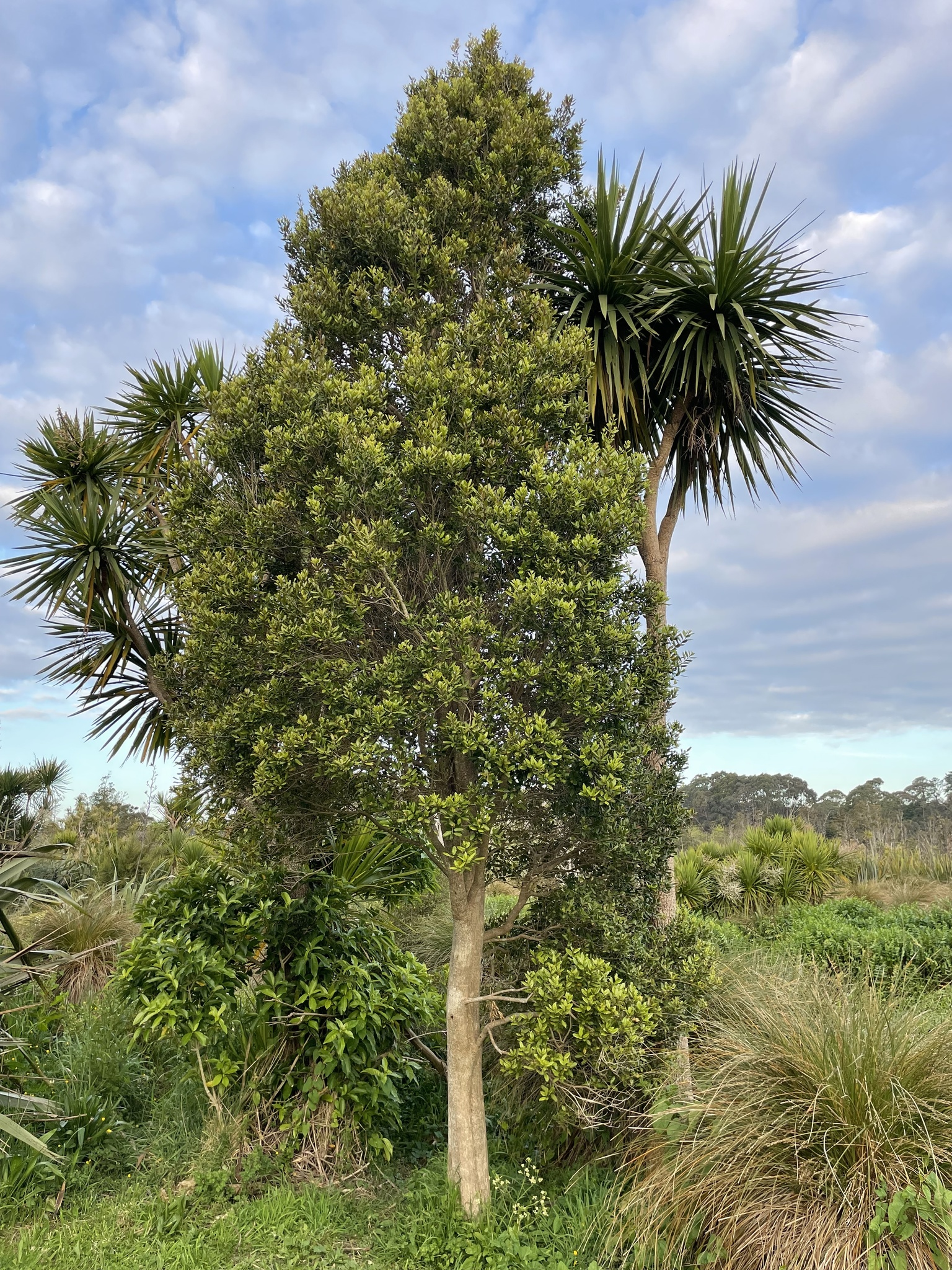
- S. maire in Auckland with tī kōuka (Cordyline australis) behind

Conservation status
- Critically Endangered (IUCN 3.1)

Scientific classification
- Kingdom: Plantae
- Clade: Tracheophytes
- Clade: Angiosperms
- Clade: Eudicots
- Clade: Rosids
- Order: Myrtales
- Family: Myrtaceae
- Genus: Syzygium
- Species: S. maire

Binomial name
- Syzygium maire (A.Cunn.) Sykes & Garn.-Jones

Synonyms
- Eugenia maire A.Cunn.

= Syzygium maire =

Swamp maire

Species of tree

Syzygium maire, commonly known as the swamp maire, is an evergreen tree endemic to New Zealand. It is found throughout the North Island, and in the northern half of the South Island. The Māori name for the tree is maire tawake. Swamp maire grows in wetlands, where it develops breathing roots in waterlogged soils, but is also tolerant of reasonably dry situations. The creamy-white flowers in autumn are followed by bright red drupes around 3 cm in length in late winter. The fruit are edible and can be eaten raw or cooked. The fruits are rich in antioxidants. Swamp maire is sold for use in gardens as an ornamental plant. It is not related to other species called maire, which are in the genus Notelaea.
