= Manawapou River =

Coordinates: 39°39′S 174°21′E

Location
- Country: New Zealand

Physical characteristics
- Mouth
  - location: South Taranaki Bight
- Length: 21 km (13 mi)

The Manawapou River is a river of the Taranaki Region of New Zealand's North Island. It flows southwest, from its origins in rough hill country to the northeast of Hāwera, to reach the South Taranaki Bight between Hāwera and Pātea.

== Geology ==
The river rises on a sandy mid-Pliocene Tangahoe Mudstone, formed in a shallow sea, then its valley is cut down to early-Pliocene Whenuakura Group rocks (bioclastic limestone, pebbly and micaceous sandstones and massive siltstone), whilst the surrounding land is covered by mid-Pleistocene beach deposits of conglomerate, sand, peat and clay.

== See also ==
- List of rivers of New Zealand
