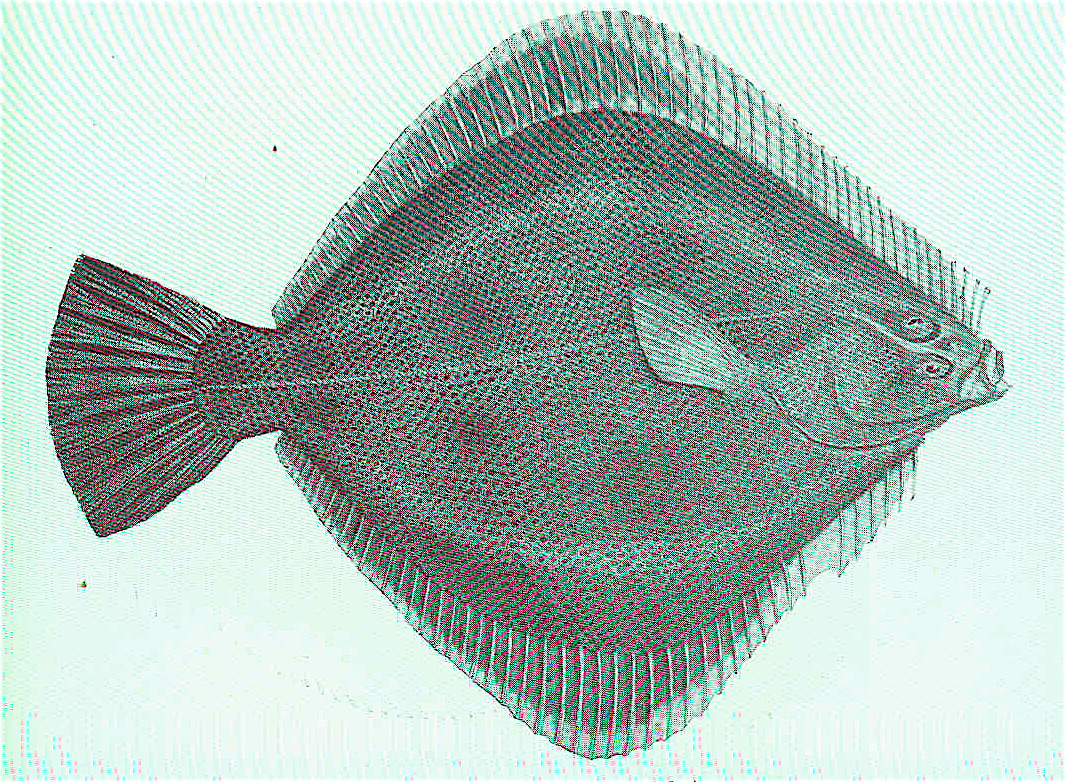
- Rhombosolea plebela
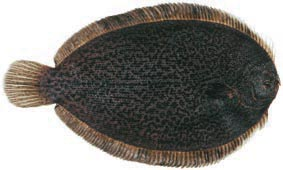
- Colistium guntheri New Zealand Brill

Scientific classification
- Kingdom: Animalia
- Phylum: Chordata
- Class: Actinopterygii
- Order: Carangiformes
- Suborder: Pleuronectoidei
- Family: Rhombosoleidae; Regan, 1910

Type genus
- Rhombosolea Günther, 1862

= Rhombosoleidae =

Family of flatfishes

Rhombosoleidae is a family of flatfish, comprising nine genera and 19 species; all members of this family are right eye flounders with asymmetrical pelvic fins. Species are typically demersal, living on bottoms in temperate marine waters on the continental shelf, although some species of Rhombosolea enter fresh water in New Zealand. Most are restricted to waters around Australia and New Zealand, though the Indonesian ocellated flounder, Psammodiscus ocellatus, occurs in Indonesia.

In some traditional classifications, this group was formerly recognised as a subfamily, Rhombosoleinae, of the Pleuronectidae. The Remo flounder Oncopterus darwinii, which occurs in the southwestern Atlantic and previously part of this family, is now placed in its own monotypic family.

== Genera ==
- Ammotretis
- Azygopus
- Colistium
- Pelotretis
- Peltorhamphus
- Psammodiscus
- Rhombosolea
- Taratretis
