= Moumahaki railway station =

Railway station in New Zealand

Moumahaki

General information
- Location: New Zealand
- Coordinates: 39.774697°S 174.676948°E
- Elevation: 82 m (269 ft)
- Line: Marton–New Plymouth line
- Platforms: Single side
- Tracks: 1

Construction
- Structure type: At-grade, timber

History
- Opened: 23 March 1881
- Closed: 4 January 1970 (passengers); 22 September 1986 (freight)
- Former names: Momahaki (to 15 March 1906)
Location
Notes
- Previous Station: Waitotara Station; Next Station: Waverley Station

Moumahaki railway station (originally Momahaki) was a railway station on the Marton–New Plymouth line (then the Patea–Manawatu Railway) in South Taranaki, New Zealand, between Waitotara and Waverley. It opened as a flag station in 1881 and served the adjoining Moumahaki Experimental Farm and surrounding farmland for over a century, closing to passengers in 1970 and to all traffic in 1986.

== History ==
=== Naming and opening ===
The goods shed at Momahaki was under construction by January 1881, and the station opened on 23 March 1881. Like the nearby Nukumaru station, it began as a flag station, with trains stopping only to set down or pick up passengers on request. The spelling of the name was inconsistent in its early years — timetables rendered it "Momohaki", while the station building itself was painted "Momahaki" — and the correct form, Moumahaki, was formally adopted on 15 March 1906.

=== Facilities ===
The station had a shelter shed, a platform on the right-hand side, a cart approach, a 40 by 30 foot goods shed, a loading bank and urinals, in place by at least 1896. A crossing loop and backshunt served the yard, their capacity expanded several times: from around 13–18 wagons in the loop and 11 in the backshunt in 1896, to 39, 13 and 6 wagons respectively by 1911, and 38, 12 and 12 wagons by 1969. A stationary hand crane was in regular use in the goods shed by the late 1890s; it was removed in October 1904 to replace the wharf shed crane at Wanganui. Cattle and sheep yards had been added by the mid-1900s, and were substantially extended in 1927 to assist farmers in the district. Electric lighting was installed at the station in 1928 to allow cattle loading at night. Railway houses were built on the Waverley side of the level crossing, opposite the station, in October 1920.

The station building was damaged by fire on 30 December 1937 and again on 12 September 1955. The original loading bank was removed in 1964 as being in poor repair and little used, but a new high-level bank was added in 1967 to handle grain traffic. By 1969 Moumahaki was formally recorded as an unattended flag station.

=== Moumahaki Experimental Farm ===
A private siding served the adjoining Moumahaki Experimental Farm, including its lucerne-drying plant, which converted hay grown on the farm; production continued until the early 1980s, when rising fuel costs made the process uneconomic. While the farm was operating, excursion trains regularly stopped at the station to bring visitors to open days and picnics. In March 1907 a special holiday excursion train ran from Palmerston North to the farm and back; in June 1908 a party of 65 Midhurst-district settlers and their wives, organised through the local Farmers' Union, travelled to the farm by mail train for a tour and luncheon; and in March 1911 employees of the Eastown railway workshops and maintenance department held their annual picnic at the farm, with a special train carrying ten carriages arriving mid-morning to be met by farm transport.

=== Incidents ===
In October 1927 the engine of a mixed train from New Plymouth was derailed at Moumahaki, causing a delay of about three hours; the Railways Department subsequently placed a porter permanently in charge at the station.

The station was the site of two fatal accidents involving men moving between railway vehicles while trains were in motion. On 6 January 1938, railway employee Albert Vinten jumped from the rear platform of a passing carriage onto the station platform; he was struck on the head by the carriage's axle box and thrown across the line, and died in Wanganui Hospital that evening. On 8 May 1941, soldier Private James Walter Strood was struck by the station's tablet exchanger while attempting to climb from a carriage onto the engine of a Wellington–New Plymouth express; he died at Patea Hospital eight days later, on 16 May.

In May 1940, a motor car was struck by a goods train at a level crossing in a cutting near the station, injuring both occupants.

=== Closure ===
Moumahaki closed to passenger traffic on 4 January 1970, thereafter handling wagon-load freight only; the station building and platform were slated for removal. The station building was sold to Joss Smith of Waverley on 4 June 1970 (the same Smith who, as Waverley's last stationmaster, later secured that station's building from removal and helped establish its railway museum). The goods shed and stockyards closed in February 1978, and were sold, along with the 1880-built platform, to F. J. Potts over the following months. High and low-level loading banks remained in use into 1980, but the last public sidings were scheduled for removal in 1985, leaving only a loop and private siding. The station closed to all traffic on 22 September 1986.

Little remains of the station site today. Immediately south of the Lower Okotuku Road junction, the line is now a single track. At the same time, a railway gate (with bent rail supports) remains beside State Highway 3 (recorded on older maps as Weraroa Road), marking the former approach to the station building. The former goods yard now stores gravel and aggregate.

== See also ==
- Marton–New Plymouth line
- Waverley, Taranaki
