= Waverley railway station, Taranaki =

Railway station in New Zealand

Waverley
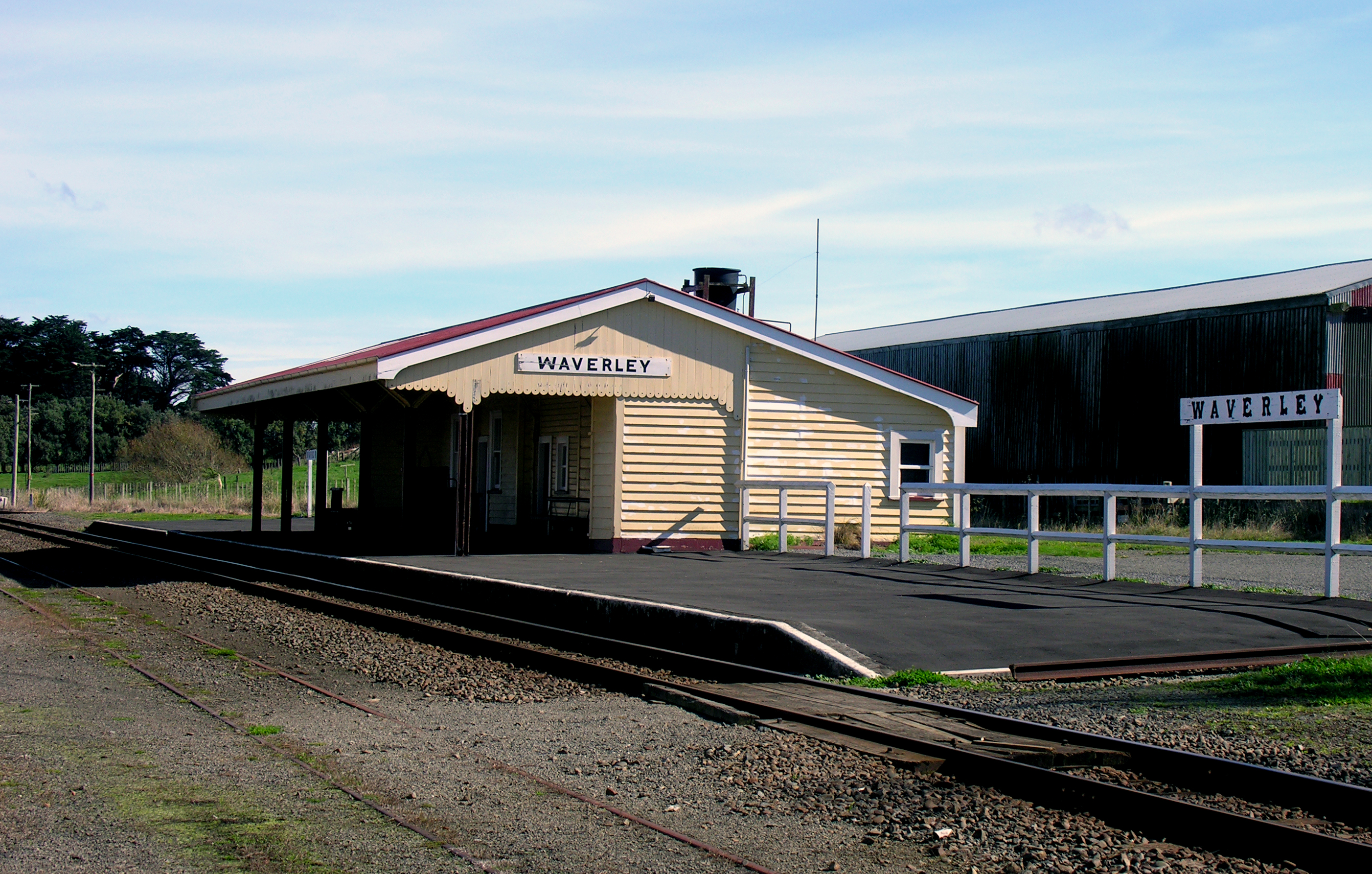
- Waverley Railway Station in April 2006

General information
- Location: Oturi Road, Waverley 4510; New Zealand
- Coordinates: 39.76861°S 174.6268°E
- Elevation: 76 m (249 ft)
- Line: Marton–New Plymouth line
- Distance: 89.19 kilometres (55.42 mi) from Marton
- Platforms: Single side
- Tracks: 1

Construction
- Structure type: At-grade, timber
- Parking: yes
- Architectural style: Vogel class 4 (modified)

Other information
- Classification: RHTNZ Category A building

History
- Opened: 23 March 1881; 145 years ago
- Closed: 30 July 1977; 49 years ago (passengers); 1986; 40 years ago (freight)

Heritage New Zealand – Category 1
- Designated: 28 June 1990
- Reference no.: 5109
Location
Notes
- Previous Station: Moumahaki Station; Next Station: Rangikura Station

Waverley railway station is a former railway station on the Marton–New Plymouth line in Waverley, South Taranaki, New Zealand. Built in 1880–81 as part of the line's extension north from Waitotara, it opened on 23 March 1881 and served the town for just over a century before closing to regular traffic in 1986. The station building, one of the oldest surviving examples in New Zealand of the Public Works Department's standard "Class 4" design, is registered by Heritage New Zealand (List No. 5109) and classified Category A by the Rail Heritage Trust of New Zealand.

== History ==
=== Construction ===
Waverley townspeople had until 1880 travelled to Waitotara to catch trains further south. David Wilkie, a local contractor with a personal stake in seeing the work progress quickly, signed a contract on 1 February 1880 to form and lay the permanent way from Waitotara to Waverley, with a proviso that the work be completed within a year. A separate contract for a stationmaster's house and platelayer's cottage, estimated at £1,125, was won the same month by local builders McFarlane & Swinbourn; Wilkie's firm found a ballast pit within 20 yards of the line, easing construction.

By late January 1881 the Patea Mail reported the station buildings "begin[ning] to assume form", with the engine shed nearly finished and the goods shed "getting on towards completion". The Rail Heritage Trust's own file notes for the station record a string of associated authority requests through 1880–81: for the stationmaster's house (17 January 1880), for the station's water supply (8 and 21 January 1881), for the approach road (24 January 1881), and for £40 10s to add a Telegraph office to the building (24 January 1881). A November 1880 report in the Patea Mail noted the Waverley section was "being pushed on" with speed, "a marked contrast" to the slower progress on the Kai Iwi and Waitotara sections.

The station building itself was of timber-frame construction, clad in rusticated weatherboards under an iron roof, built in the lean-to form typical of the Class 4 design, with a central recessed lobby flanked by an office (left, viewed from the track) and a ladies' waiting room with adjoining toilet (right). Ornate posts and arched windows were added for visual interest; the interior was match-lined with sash windows, and the building faced south-west directly into the prevailing wind.

=== Opening ===
The line to Waverley was certified fit for traffic on 27 March 1881, and archival file notes record that "the line to Waverley will be opened on 23/3/1881". The station was in use from early 1881 but not formally opened until 23 March, when a public banquet preceded the ceremony. An excursion train ran from Wanganui at around 7:00 am under the line's manager, and 50 to 60 gentlemen later assembled at the new town hall for a spread prepared by Mr Ballam of the Waverley Hotel. A telegram from the Hon. Major Atkinson offered congratulations and a promise to lose no opportunity in completing the gap between Waverley and Hawera "at as early a date as the funds of the colony will permit". That November, the Waverley–Waitotara Racing Club advertised that trains would run to the end of the line, a mile short of town, for race-day patrons. By November 1880 the Post and Telegraph section of the building was complete and cattle sidings had been added to the yard.

=== Stationmasters and incidents ===
Mr King is recorded as the station's first stationmaster. He was followed in 1881 by Mr Cleary, who arrived from New Plymouth and left in 1883 — well-regarded enough to be given a farewell luncheon at Mrs Price's Welcome Stranger Hotel in Waverley and a purse of 38 sovereigns before moving on to Feilding. His successor, Mr Bragg, left in May 1888 for Stratford, where he died the following year after a period of poor health; he was remembered for a businesslike, straightforward manner. In July 1888, shortly after Bragg's departure, an attempt was made to burgle the station; the new stationmaster, whose house was close by, disturbed the intruders and frightened them off, and a skeleton key left behind in the ticket office lock was thought to indicate a burglary at Pātea station the previous week. Separately, in August 1888 a man named Robert Jackson (alias Patrick Loughran) was brought before the New Plymouth police court charged with using skeleton keys to break into and steal from stores and shops between New Plymouth and Wanganui, including tickets worth over £7 from Patea station and a similar theft at Waverley.

Mr H. E. Burr served as stationmaster for "several years" until 1897, when he was replaced by Mr Horswell, promoted from a clerk's position at Palmerston North; Horswell left in 1900 owing to his wife's ill health, a departure that was regretted. In May 1915 two men, Herbert Bernard and Herbert Learning, faced the Wanganui criminal sessions over an alleged theft of £11 10s from Waverley railway station and an alleged attempted pocket-picking respectively; both were found not guilty and discharged. In October 1909 lightning struck and fused a wire at the telegraph office at nearby Alton, and at "just about the same time" a similar accident occurred at the Waverley station's telegraph office, fusing wires without injury to anyone.

=== Traffic and local trade ===
The station's goods shed and yard served the surrounding farming district for over a century. A 1930 newspaper advertisement for T. W. Wall, timber merchant, described the business as sited "immediately opposite Waverley Railway Station", making butter boxes and cheese crates with a staff of 20. The Waverley Dairy Company, discussed in a 1935 article, was likewise situated by the railway station and shipped its product through it. A single state house for the Railways Department was completed at Waverley in November 1953, and a new type of tablet exchanger was installed in February 1965 to speed the exchange of the single-line staff or tablet with passing trains.

=== Alterations ===
A verandah was added in 1896, giving the building its present gable form, set on six railway-iron posts with scalloped valancing at each end. The platform and station buildings were raised in 1899. New toilets were provided in 1939, and in 1956 the open lobby was enclosed with a swinging door from the platform, with the ladies' waiting room relocated. In 1981 a gang amenity was added to the building, with walls and partitions rearranged to make room for lockers, toilets, showers and a communal room.

== Closure and museum era ==
Waverley station closed to regular traffic in 1986, becoming a special-purpose station rather than being demolished outright. A few years later, tenders were called to remove the station building, goods shed and tracks; the retired and last-serving stationmaster, Joss Smith, secured a long-term lease over the complex and saved it from removal. The Friends of the Waverley Railway Station was formed the same year to maintain and develop the site, and in 1992 the station reopened as a historic site and railway museum. It closed again in 2011 following Smith's death. The Rail Heritage Trust's own record states the building was leased to the Friends group "until 2013", and describes it as "currently unoccupied".

Following the group's dissolution, items from its collection were dispersed to other heritage organisations. SteamRail Wanganui received at least three items formerly held by the Friends of the Waverley Railway Station: an LC-class high-sided wagon (LC 54732) and a YB-class ballast wagon (YB 1662, later E 7780), both delivered on 23 July 2013 with the help of Emmett's Cranes, and an XP-class box wagon (XP 3042, later E 6695), delivered on 13 February 2018 with the help of Emmett's Cranes and TIL (Hookers) Transport.

The former Waitotara station building, which had earlier been relocated to the Waverley yard for preservation, was translocated from the Waverley station yard to the Waitara Railway Preservation Society's Brixton depot in April 2022, with funding from the Toi Foundation and specialist work by Agtrans of Hawera. Further funding from the Taranaki Electricity Trust supported replacement timber, paint and electrical fittings; the exterior restoration was completed by volunteers over the following three years, with interior work under way as of August 2025. The building now stands alongside the former Tahora station building at the society's depot.

== Heritage listing ==
Waverley railway station was registered by Heritage New Zealand Pouhere Taonga under the Historic Places Act 1980 (List No. 5109). Heritage New Zealand describes it as representative of the more than 1,000 country stations that once served New Zealand's rural rail network, of which few now survive, and notes the Class 4 design's distinctive recessed lobby, decorated arches, capped posts and miniature arched windows. The Rail Heritage Trust of New Zealand separately classifies the complex — station building, goods shed, loading bank and sidings — as Category A, describing Waverley as the finest surviving example of a modified Vogel Class 4 station; no unmodified examples of the type are known to survive.

== Log hub proposal ==
In June 2020, a KiwiRail feasibility study into export log movement by rail in the Taranaki–Whanganui region concluded there was scope for such services and recommended Waverley as the preferred site for a log-handling hub, describing it as "operationally feasible" and able to be developed "at relatively low cost", being the nearest existing yard suited to the purpose. A 2021 newspaper column citing the report put the estimated cost at $8.8 million for wagons, $5.2 million for alterations to the Waverley site, and $3 million for alterations at Port Taranaki.

== Waverley Racecourse railway station ==
About a mile from the main station, a flag station and siding served the Waverley Racecourse. A gate and protective fencing had already been erected at the site by September 1882, and £300 was authorised for a proper flag station and siding in March 1884; erection of the shelter shed itself was delayed, for reasons recorded in a July 1885 file note but not stated. By 1886 the site was recorded as 1 mile 51 chains from Waverley station (33 miles 56 chains from Wanganui). A shelter shed, passenger platform and loading bank were in place by July 1896, served by a loop able to hold 16 wagons, expanded to 20 wagons the following year; the erection of a goods shed was urged in December 1896.

Sheep yards were added in December 1942, with electric lighting over the stockyards approved in 1945. By November 1960 the shelter shed was approved for removal, with file notes recording that there had been no passenger traffic "for some years" and that no trains were scheduled to stop for passengers — the site's role by then being entirely for stock and goods. Loading facilities were reconfigured repeatedly in the early 1970s for bulk grain handling, with sheep pens and a stock holding yard progressively removed between 1971 and 1974. A high-level loading bank and grain silos were added in 1980, but the site closed to all but wagon-lot traffic in September 1981. By November 1987 it was recorded simply as "Waverley Racecourse siding", 92.54 km from Marton Junction on the renumbered Marton–New Plymouth–Breakwater Line.

== See also ==
- Marton–New Plymouth line
- Waverley, Taranaki
