= Waitotara School =

Location
- Trent Street, Waitotara, New Zealand; 39.8042°S 174.7351°E

Information
- Type: State, Primary (Year 0-8)
- Established: 1874
- Ministry of Education Institution no.: 2474
- Principal: Ross Harvey
- Enrolment: 22
- Socio-economic decile: 2
- Website: waitotara.school.nz

Waitotara School is a small state primary school situated in the rural village of Waitōtara, located between Whanganui and Hāwera, New Zealand, on State Highway 3.

The school sits on the banks of the Waitōtara River, 47 km south of Ngamatapouri, and was fully refurbished after devastating floods in 2004. These floods destroyed much of the interior of the school buildings as well as furniture and equipment, while many homes in the small community of Waitōtara were also badly damaged.
