= Waverly School =

Waverly School may refer to:

- The Waverly School, California
- Waverly High School (disambiguation)
- Waverly Senior High School, Michigan

== See also ==
- Waverly School District (disambiguation)
