= Waiinu Beach =

Settlement in Taranaki Region, New Zealand

- Interactive map of Waiinu Beach
- Coordinates: 39.864°S 174.747°E
- Country: New Zealand
- Region: Taranaki
- Territorial authority: South Taranaki District
- Ward: Pātea General Ward; Te Tai Tonga Māori Ward
- Community: Pātea Community
- Electorates: Whanganui; Te Tai Hauāuru (Māori)

Government
  - Territorial Authority: South Taranaki District Council
  - Regional council: Taranaki Regional Council
  - Mayor of South Taranaki: Phil Nixon
  - Whanganui MP: Carl Bates
  - Te Tai Hauāuru MP: Debbie Ngarewa-Packer

Area
  - Total: 0.25 km^{2} (0.097 sq mi)

Population (June 2025)
  - Total: 90
  - Density: 360/km^{2} (930/sq mi)

Waiinu Beach is a settlement on the South Taranaki Bight in South Taranaki, New Zealand. Waverley is 18.5 km to the north-west by road, and Whanganui is 42 km to the south-east.

Road access to Waiinu Beach was by a single road to Waitōtara until 2024. The road has been closed four times in 26 years, due to flooding at the bridge over the Waitōtara River. To improve access, work began on an extension to Nukumaru Station Road in July 2021. The work uncovered several pre-colonial Māori storage pits. The new road opened in 2024.

The settlement contains a campground.

== Demographics ==
Waiinu Beach is described by Stats NZ as a rural settlement. It covers 0.25 km^{2} (0.097 sq mi) and had an estimated population of 90 as of June 2025, with a population density of 360 people per km^{2}. It is part of the larger Manutahi-Waitotora statistical area.

Historical population
Year	Pop.	±% p.a.
2006	93	—
2013	69	−4.17%
2018	81	+3.26%
2023	96	+3.46%

Waiinu Beach had a population of 96 in the 2023 New Zealand census, an increase of 15 people (18.5%) since the 2018 census, and an increase of 27 people (39.1%) since the 2013 census. There were 48 males and 48 females in 51 dwellings. The median age was 61.8 years (compared with 38.1 years nationally). There were 6 people (6.2%) aged under 15 years, 6 (6.2%) aged 15 to 29, 45 (46.9%) aged 30 to 64, and 42 (43.8%) aged 65 or older.

People could identify as more than one ethnicity. The results were 90.6% European (Pākehā), 15.6% Māori, and 6.2% other, which includes people giving their ethnicity as "New Zealander". English was spoken by 100.0%, and Māori by 6.2%. No people were born overseas, compared with 28.8% nationally.

Religious affiliations were 34.4% Christian, 3.1% Māori religious beliefs, and 3.1% New Age. People who answered that they had no religion were 56.2%, and 6.2% of people did not answer the census question.

Of those at least 15 years old, 3 (3.3%) people had a bachelor's or higher degree, 51 (56.7%) had a post-high school certificate or diploma, and 33 (36.7%) people exclusively held high school qualifications. The median income was $29,800, compared with $41,500 nationally. 3 people (3.3%) earned over $100,000 compared to 12.1% nationally. The employment status of those at least 15 was 27 (30.0%) full-time, 9 (10.0%) part-time, and 3 (3.3%) unemployed.
