= Pehimana =

Pehimana was the son of Ngā Rauru chief Āperahama Tama-i-parea, and was involved with the sale of the Waitotara block.

== Biography ==
Pehimana was not born to Aperahama Tama-i-parea but classed Aperahama as a father. This Aperahama came from Whanganui from Putiki and his wife Riria Kamuwai around the early 1840s. Under Aperahama Ngā Rauru had converted to Christianity and become involved economically with Pākehā settlers. This Aperahama was a superintendent not to get him mixed up with Aperahama Tamaiparea who was the Chief of Ihupuku and was part of the Anglican faith, he also did baptisms.. The reason I add this korero is because there are a lot of people who get mixed up with the two Aperahama names .. They were named by Reverend Richard Taylor and sometimes Rev Taylor would give them the same Christian names and change their last names by a dash...and Aperahama Tamaiparea his wife was Arihia. In 1859 Pehimana and Aperahama Tama-i-parea sold the Waitotara Block to the government.

As Māori-Pākehā conflict escalated in the 1860s, Pehimana and his father became Pai Marire adherents. Aperahama joined other chiefs at Weraroa pa on the Waitotara River, with whom he warned Lieutenant General Duncan Cameron to withdraw his troops south of the Kai Iwi Stream in February 1865. Cameron, however, took the villages of Perekama and Arei-ahi, and Pehimana and Aperahama duly submitted to the government. Aperahama Tama-1-parea was killed at putiki and the other aperahama tamaiparea died of old age.

Pehihama was subsequently employed by British troops as a guide, and in 1866 acted as General Chute’s advisor for the final Taranaki Campaign.
