= Waitōtara railway station =

Railway station in New Zealand

Waitōtara

General information
- Location: New Zealand
- Coordinates: 39.819756°S 174.724584°E
- Elevation: 18 m (59 ft)
- Line: Marton–New Plymouth line
- Distance: 78.71 kilometres (48.91 mi) from Marton
- Platforms: Single side
- Tracks: 1

Construction
- Structure type: At-grade, timber

History
- Opened: 20 September 1880; 146 years ago
- Closed: 15 September 1986; 40 years ago
Location
Notes
- Previous Station: Nukumaru Station; Next Station: Moumahaki Station

Waitōtara railway station was a railway station on the Marton–New Plymouth line (then the Wanganui–Patea Railway) in South Taranaki, New Zealand, on the north bank of the Waitōtara River. Opened on 20 September 1880 as the temporary northern terminus of the Whanganui line, the station closed on 15 September 1986, though its crossing loop was retained.

== History ==
=== Construction ===
A contract for the railway bridge over the Waitōtara River was let in late 1879 to Mr Bicheno, whose work was complicated by the nature of the riverbed and by an initial load of bridge timber being condemned by officials. Construction was further delayed in May 1880 when floodwater carried away scaffolding for the bridge's second span, a loss the contractor estimated at £30 and expected to delay completion by a month; much of the washed-away timber was later recovered downstream and barged back to the site. By late June 1880 the bridge was substantially complete. The station buildings contract, covering a wooden building of two rooms and a goods shed, was won by R. McLean of Foxton for £1,780, ahead of six other tenderers including D. Wilkie of Waitōtara itself; the stationmaster's house, completed in January 1880, was described as a commodious and well-finished residence facing the line near the Durie brothers' shearing shed. Rails reached the Waitōtara bridge by late April 1880.

Two labourers were seriously injured, one fatally, when a bank of earth collapsed on them in a cutting on the Waitōtara contract on 24 April 1879; the deceased was named as George Jackson in one contemporary report.

=== Opening ===
Regular goods traffic began running as far as Waitōtara from 1 September 1880, ahead of the line's formal opening, to assist local settlers while construction continued northward toward Waverley. The line opened to public traffic on Monday 20 September 1880, per an official notice published the preceding week under District Manager T. F. Rotheram; a ceremonial special train had run the previous day, with visitors entertained at Waitōtara by Adam Johnston and at Okehu by J. Handley, and a testimonial of a clock, barometer and field-glass presented to the contract's manager, Mr Whiting. Waitōtara remained the railhead for just over six months, until the extension to Waverley opened on 23 March 1881, the day Waitōtara ceased to be the line's northern terminus.

=== Facilities ===
==== Station building ====
The original 1880 station building contract, won by R. McLean of Foxton for £1,780, provided a wooden building of three compartments — a stationmaster's office, a lobby doubling as a general waiting room, and a ladies' waiting room — alongside a separate goods shed. An extension followed almost immediately: from 9 November 1880, carpenters added a fourth compartment, with its own door and window, to house the town's Post and Telegraph office (see below). The Cyclopedia of New Zealand later described the station as a wooden building "of four compartments," with a separate goods shed, reflecting this extended form rather than the original layout.

The Railways Department made further, unspecified alterations to the building's interior in early 1914, which locals described as giving staff considerably more working room. Photographic evidence shows the building was later shortened and its open lobby enclosed at some point between 1951 and 1977; the exact date and circumstances of this alteration are not recorded in available sources.

While Rail Heritage Trust archive entries for Waitōtara, spanning 1896 to 1911, consistently describe it as a "5th class station building", photographic comparison with a plain Class 5 building such as Rangikura suggests the building may instead have been constructed to Class 4 plans. (Note: A recessed central lobby and longer porch than Rangikura's have been noted as points of comparison. A precedent exists on this line for a station's built form differing from its documented class: nearby Inglewood station is recorded by the Rail Heritage Trust as "a modified Vogel class 4 station".)

==== Post and Telegraph Office ====
Waitōtara residents initially complained the station was too far out of town; the Durie brothers built a seven-stall stable and loosebox near their woolshed to accommodate travellers' horses, and the Railway Hotel ran a coach to meet each train. On 9 November 1880, carpenters began an addition to the station building to allow the town's Post and Telegraph office to relocate there, making the stationmaster also postmaster — an unpopular move locally, though it went ahead regardless; a cattle siding was added to the yard the same month. The Post Office at the station formally opened on 1 March 1881, operated by Railways Department staff. It was removed to the township in 1888, reopened at the station in July 1891 under postmaster Mr Andrews — remembered as accommodating, including once supplying returning military volunteers with tea from a large jug — and was removed to the township again in July 1894. The Railways Department made further, unspecified alterations to the station's interior in early 1914, giving staff considerably more working room.

==== Yard and triangle ====
Waitōtara's yard was substantially larger than its southerly neighbours, with loop capacity of around 21–27 wagons in 1896 growing to 51–58 wagons by the early 1900s, alongside a goods shed, loading bank, cattle and sheep yards, and a stationary hand crane. The electric tablet system was extended to Waitōtara from Turakina on 1 November 1901. A triangle for turning locomotives was built at the station, needed because engines banked trains up the Westmere and Maxwell grades; it was removed at the end of the steam era once diesel locomotives could work the Aramoho–Waitōtara section unassisted. In early 1932, a five-month relief-scheme project using 35 unemployed men eased a sharp curve on a 30-chain deviation south of the station, raising the line's speed limit there from 25 to 35 mph.

=== Incidents ===
A ganger named John Head died after a fall on the line in April 1895: while working near a curve, he fell forward onto the rails for reasons unknown and was struck in the head by an approaching engine, dying that night after surgery. He and his wife had already lost five of their eight children in the preceding sixteen months, two by drowning. On 13 December 1939, railway ganger Thomas Barnard, 51, of Waitōtara, was killed instantly when struck by the engine of a southbound mixed train while clearing weeds from a yard loop.

A washout on the line about a mile north of the station badly disrupted the "Flier" express and the Wellington–New Plymouth express on 21 July 1936; passengers were transferred to buses to Waverley before temporary repairs allowed traffic to resume, the "Flier" eventually reaching Hawera about two hours late.

=== Waitōtara Lime Works ===
A lime works operated alongside a special siding in the station yard, drawing shell-rock from deposits along the Waitōtara River, initially hauled across the river by dray and a pulley-and-wire system until a dedicated Lime Works Bridge was built shortly before the First World War, under the works' earlier owner, the Wairoa Lime Company Ltd. The Waitōtara Lime Company itself was formed on 14 January 1935 to take over the operation. Fire severely damaged the works in the early hours of 12 August 1937; the Wanganui Fire Brigade managed to save a considerable portion of the buildings, though full repairs were expected to take about two months. A Dunedin firm made a tentative offer to purchase the works in late 1942, by which point substantial alterations and plant additions had already been made since the company's formation.

== Decline and closure ==
Waitōtara's goods traffic remained substantial into the late 1920s — some 200 tons of wool passed through in a single day in December 1927 — but service levels declined thereafter. Residents of Waitōtara, Ngutuwera, Nukumaru, Rangitatau and Upper Waitōtara protested unsuccessfully against the cutting of a mail-train stop at the station in 1923. Falling revenue led to Waitōtara being closed as an officered station on 8 September 1930, with stationmaster Mr Prain transferred to Wanganui and the station left in the charge of tablet porters thereafter. From September 1933 two named services were reinstated to stop at the station on request.

Local services on the line were progressively withdrawn from the 1950s: the New Plymouth Express and Taranaki Flyer ran for the last time on 31 October 1955, their railcar substitute for the latter ending in February 1959, and the Standard railcars that replaced these were themselves displaced from the line in late 1972 in favour of refurbished "Blue Streak" railcars. Waitōtara closed to passenger traffic on 31 May 1976.

Waitōtara closed to all remaining traffic on 15 September 1986, though the crossing loop was retained and remains in KiwiRail's active network today, grouped operationally with the neighbouring Kai Iwi and Pātea loops.

== Building preservation ==
Following closure, the neglected building was relocated to Waverley station yard through the efforts of the Friends of the Waverley Railway Station, where it remained until the Waitara Railway Preservation Society took ownership and relocated it to their depot at Brixton in March 2022. The platform was extended in June 2023, and the building was restored, including recladding and further alterations to its front elevation, by August 2025.

== See also ==
- Marton–New Plymouth line
- Waitōtara
