= Waverly High School =

Waverly High School may refer to:

== United States ==
- Waverly High School (Illinois), Waverly, Illinois
- Waverly High School (Kansas), Waverly, Kansas
- Waverly Senior High School, Lansing, Michigan
- Waverly High School (Nebraska), Waverly, Nebraska
- Waverly Junior and Senior High School, Waverly, Tioga County, New York
- Waverly High School (Ohio), Waverly, Ohio
- Waverly High School (South Dakota), Waverly, Codington County, South Dakota
- Waverly Central High School, Waverly, Tennessee

== Elsewhere ==
- Waverley High School, Australia, Glen Waverley, Melbourne, Australia
- Waverley High School, New Zealand, Taranaki Region, New Zealand

== See also ==
- New Waverly High School, New Waverly, Texas
- Waverly-Shell Rock Senior High School, Waverly, Iowa
- Howard Lake-Waverly-Winsted High School, Howard Lake, Minnesota
