= Rangikura railway station =

Railway station in New Zealand

Rangikura

General information
- Location: Dryden Road, Waverley; New Zealand
- Coordinates: 39°46′27″S 174°33′03″E
- Elevation: 57 m (187 ft)
- System: New Zealand Government Railways (NZGR); Regional rail
- Line: Marton–New Plymouth line
- Distance: 69 mi 73 ch (approx. 112.5 km) from New Plymouth
- Platforms: Single, left side

Construction
- Structure type: At-grade, timber (5th class station)

History
- Opened: 28 August 1883; 143 years ago
- Closed: 16 April 1972; 54 years ago (all traffic)
- Former names: Whenuakura (until 1927)
Location
Notes
- Previous Station: Waverley Station; Next station: Pātea Station

Rangikura railway station, known as Whenuakura railway station until 1927, was a railway station on the Marton–New Plymouth line in South Taranaki, New Zealand. It served the district between Patea and Waverley for around ninety years, from its construction in the early 1880s until its closure to all traffic in 1972.

== History ==
=== Construction ===
The station was built as part of the Wanganui–Patea Railway, the section of what later became the Marton–New Plymouth line running north from Wanganui. A schedule of tenders for the station buildings was called on 26 July 1882, and the construction contract was signed on 8 August 1882. The final certificate for the buildings was issued on 5 April 1883, and further authority was sought that year for an approach road to the ballast pit and for a new road to the station itself. The Whenuakura Road Board complained to the Government in January 1884 about the poor state of the road leading to the station, and the County Road Board's estimate for metalling the worst section was put at £165 the following month — suggesting the station was already in use by the district's farmers and settlers by that point. The station took its original name, Whenuakura, from the nearby Whenuakura River.

The station was a Vogel-era 5th class building with a passenger platform. A survey in 1896 recorded the station building, a goods shed measuring 40 by 30 feet, a loading bank and urinals, served by loops able to hold 22 and 27 wagons and a 17-wagon backshunt; the loops were shortly after enlarged slightly, to 26 and 27 wagons, a configuration that remained largely unchanged for the next two decades. Cattle and sheep yards had been added by December 1911, and railway houses for staff were built in July 1919. Additional rooms were added to one of the station cottages in 1898.

==== Post Office ====
The station housed the area's post office from July 1905. This was common practice in rural areas, allowing mail to be delivered by rail. The post office was removed in August 1933, to be replaced with rural delivery from Waverley.

=== Later years ===
On 26 February 1927 the New Zealand Railways Department changed the station's name from Whenuakura to Rangikura. An application for a stacking site at the station was made to the Public Works Department in January 1938.

In March 1937, Rangikura featured as a landmark in a Taranaki Regiment training exercise. The 1st Battalion, camped nearby at the Waverley racecourse for its annual week, staged a mock defence against a hypothetical seaborne landing, with motorcycles, lorries and mock artillery fire reported ranging across the country "between Rangikura railway station and the coast" for most of the day.

A Retrolens aerial photograph taken on 29 January 1964 shows the station building and several outbuildings strung along the line at a road crossing, with a small cluster of railway houses further along the frontage road.

=== Closure ===
The Railways Department approved closure of Rangikura station to all traffic on 23 March 1972, with the closure taking effect on 16 April 1972.

== See also ==
- Marton–New Plymouth line
- Waverley railway station
- Whenuakura River
