= Pākaraka =

Settlement in Manawatū-Whanganui, New Zealand

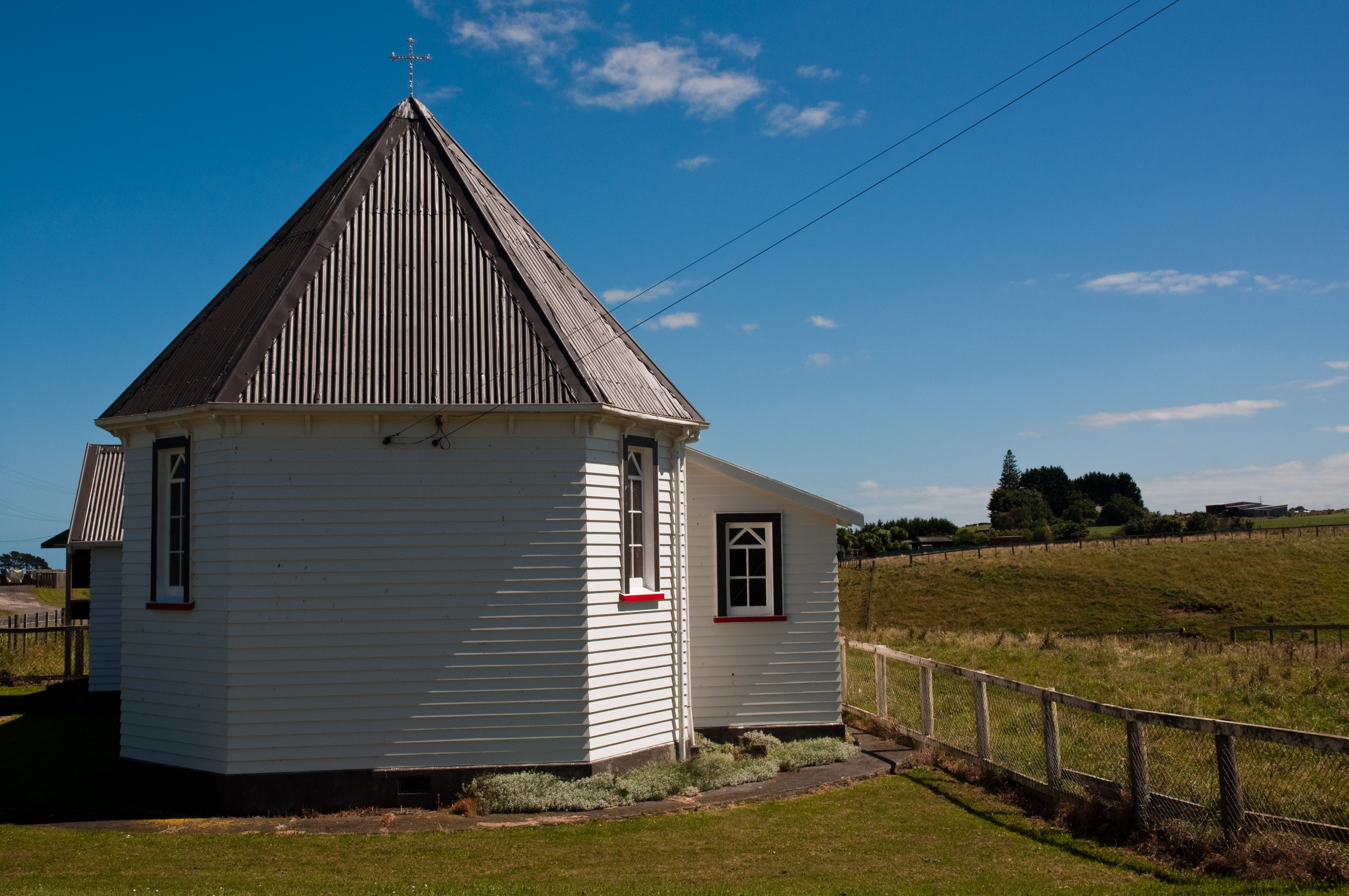
- Church in Pākaraka
- Interactive map of Pākaraka
- Coordinates: 39.821030°S 174.861786°E
- Country: New Zealand
- Region: Manawatū-Whanganui
- District: Whanganui District
- Community: Whanganui Rural Community
- Electorates: Whanganui; Te Tai Hauāuru (Māori)

Government
  - Territorial Authority: Whanganui District Council
  - Regional council: Horizons Regional Council
  - Mayor of Whanganui: Andrew Tripe
  - Whanganui MP: Carl Bates
  - Te Tai Hauāuru MP: Debbie Ngarewa-Packer

Area
  - Total: 58.24 km^{2} (22.49 sq mi)

Population (2023 Census)
  - Total: 192
  - Density: 3.30/km^{2} (8.54/sq mi)

Pākaraka, previously known as Okehu, Maxwelltown, and most recently Maxwell, is a farming and lifestyle community 20 kilometres (12 mi) west of Whanganui, in the North Island of New Zealand.

== Toponymy ==
Local Māori knew the area as Pākaraka ("an abundance of karaka trees"). Europeans first settled the area in the mid-1800s; they named the settlement "Maxwelltown", after Sergeant George Maxwell. Maxwell's actions in this location during Tītokowaru's War were described by Colonel George Stoddart Whitmore as follows:

I wish particularly to mention the extreme gallantry of Sergt G. Maxwell of the Kai Iwi Cavalry, who himself sabred two and shot one of the enemy...

This report omitted that the party that was attacked was made up of children aged between six and twelve who were out pig hunting.

In 1883, George William Rusden published a three-volume History of New Zealand, with many passages which distressed colonialists. One such passage asserted that Lieutenant John Bryce and Sergeant G. Maxwell had dashed upon women and children at Nukumara and had ‘cut them down gleefully and with ease’. At the time of publication, Bryce was Minister for Native Affairs. Bryce sued Rusden for libel in the High Court in London, winning his case on the grounds that, although he was in command of Sergeant Maxwell at the time of the killings, he did not personally participate in the killings and there were no women among the victims. Rusden's history was suppressed. Bryce was awarded £5,000 in damages, a vast sum at that time.

The area was known as Maxwelltown until 1927, and then just Maxwell. In 2020, the local hapū—Ngā Rauru—partnered with Whanganui District Council to have the name of Maxwell changed.

== History ==
The area in the 1960s offered good pig hunting sites due to the local heavy scrub. The town offers a range of activities, such as the local art gallery (Black Sands Studio), the church, swimming pool, and the newly renovated Birch Park Pool, which is situated towards the Taranaki. The area is heavily forested. Maxwell beach is a popular attraction as well; many come to see the small waterfall that runs from the farmland to the shore.

For just under a century, the area was served by Okehu (later Maxwell) railway station. It opened in 1880, closing to passengers in 1976 and freight in 1978.

== Demographics ==
Pākaraka locality covers 58.24 km^{2} (22.49 sq mi). It is part of the larger Mowhanau statistical area.

Historical population
Year	Pop.	±% p.a.
2006	192	—
2013	189	−0.22%
2018	147	−4.90%
2023	192	+5.49%

Pākaraka had a population of 192 in the 2023 New Zealand census, an increase of 45 people (30.6%) since the 2018 census, and an increase of 3 people (1.6%) since the 2013 census. There were 102 males and 90 females in 66 dwellings. 4.7% of people identified as LGBTIQ+. The median age was 34.6 years (compared with 38.1 years nationally). There were 45 people (23.4%) aged under 15 years, 33 (17.2%) aged 15 to 29, 84 (43.8%) aged 30 to 64, and 30 (15.6%) aged 65 or older.

People could identify as more than one ethnicity. The results were 90.6% European (Pākehā), 17.2% Māori, 3.1% Asian, and 3.1% other, which includes people giving their ethnicity as "New Zealander". English was spoken by 96.9%, Māori by 3.1%, and other languages by 3.1%. No language could be spoken by 3.1% (e.g. too young to talk). The percentage of people born overseas was 12.5, compared with 28.8% nationally.

The only religious affiliation given was 28.1% Christian. People who answered that they had no religion were 65.6%, and 4.7% of people did not answer the census question.

Of those at least 15 years old, 30 (20.4%) people had a bachelor's or higher degree, 78 (53.1%) had a post-high school certificate or diploma, and 36 (24.5%) people exclusively held high school qualifications. The median income was $45,600, compared with $41,500 nationally. 9 people (6.1%) earned over $100,000 compared to 12.1% nationally. The employment status of those at least 15 was 78 (53.1%) full-time, 24 (16.3%) part-time, and 3 (2.0%) unemployed.

== Culture ==
The local Pākaraka Marae and Te Whānau Pani II and III meeting houses are traditional meeting places for the Ngā Rauru hapū of Ngāti Maika II.
