= Āperahama Tama-i-parea =

Āperahama Tama-i-parea (fl. 1840–1882) was a notable New Zealand tribal leader. Of Māori descent, he identified with the Ngā Rauru iwi. He was active from about 1840.

== See also ==
- Pehimana
