= Westmere railway station =

Former railway station in New Zealand

Westmere

General information
- Other names: Brunswick
- Location: New Zealand
- Coordinates: 39.873444°S 175.010861°E
- Elevation: 141 m (463 ft)
- Line: Marton–New Plymouth line
- Platforms: Single side
- Tracks: 1

Construction
- Structure type: At-grade, timber (original)

History
- Opened: 28 June 1879; 147 years ago (as Brunswick)
- Closed: 14 November 1971; 55 years ago (all traffic)
- Former names: Brunswick
Location
Notes
- Previous Station: Aramoho Station; Next Station: Kai Iwi Station

Westmere railway station (originally Brunswick railway station) was a rural railway station on the Marton–New Plymouth line, serving the Westmere locality north of Whanganui, New Zealand. It stood at the top of the Westmere Bank, a steep climb from Aramoho that remains the line's ruling grade.

== History ==
=== Construction ===
Construction of the section north of Aramoho was under way by mid-1875: the Wanganui Herald described around fifty men, brought from Auckland by contractor Mr Lanigan, at work on "the Brunswick line", with numbers expected to nearly double. Work continued into 1876, with an advertisement that September calling for carpenters for bridge work at "Brunswick Railway Works".

Station-specific works began in September 1878, with the arrangement of the station recorded that month, tracings of alterations the following month, and further alterations later in October. Tenders for the station buildings were called in December 1878, with the contract signed before the end of the month. A request for authority for various alterations to the station followed in March 1879. The contract for the station buildings, let to Alex Fawse, was completed on 22 May 1879, with a final certificate issued on 30 May. The section from Aramoho to Kai Iwi, including the Westmere Bank, opened on 28 June 1879. At around the time of opening, a contractor working on the Wanganui reclamation requested a siding at 0 miles 36 chains on the "Brunswick Section" to help move fill.

=== Naming ===
The station (located roughly halfway between the settlements of Brunswick and Westmere) opened under the name Brunswick. It was renamed Westmere in January 1904.

=== Facilities and operations ===
Through the 1890s and 1900s the station was progressively expanded. A shelter shed, passenger platform, cart approach, goods shed (30 by 15 feet (9.1 by 4.6 m)), loading bank and urinals were in place by July 1896, with twos loops holding 20 wagons and 12 (for the goods shed), respectively. Capacity rose to 24 wagons by 1897, and a ganger's house was added in 1898. In April 1899, telephone connections were extended to Westmere and Kai Iwi, part of a wider rollout linking wayside stations back to Aramoho.

By 1908, Westmere had been converted into a switch-out (tablet) station, alongside Eyreton Junction and Puketeraki, as part of a nationwide signalling upgrade.

Fixed signals were recorded by 1904, while by 1911 the loop capacity rose to 40/22 wagons. Stockyards were applied for in 1914.

In 1891 the Waitotara County Council pressed for the road bridge near the station to be raised, and in 1896 a Wanganui resident complained that southbound trains were failing to draw up alongside the platform. In January 1925 the Waitotara County Council asked that trees at the south end of the level crossing be cut down to improve sightlines for road traffic.

Long-serving stationmaster Mr R. Kay retired in 1928 after "many years" in charge at Westmere, described in the local press as "a careful and courteous officer."

The station closed to all traffic, including passenger services, on 14 November 1971. A separate departmental notice the following month confirmed the closure.

== The Westmere Bank ==
Westmere station sat at the top of the Westmere Bank, a climb out of the Whanganui river valley from Aramoho. A 2001 official accident report described the grade approaching from the south as a 3 km long 1-in-40 upgrade to the top of the bank at Westmere, followed by a 5 km long 1-in-35 downgrade towards Wanganui (among the steepest sustained grades on the North Island's railway network). The climb was a persistent operational difficulty for over ninety years, and features repeatedly in newspaper reports independent of the station itself:

- In February 1936, a wagon caught fire while a mixed train was climbing the bank; it was uncoupled and shunted into the siding at Westmere.
- In May 1941, rain made the rails greasy on both the Wangaehu bank and the Westmere bank on the same night, forcing the mail train to be divided in two on each grade and hauled up in sections, with an engine change at Wanganui.
- In September 1943, the railcar Aotea broke down on the bank and returned to Aramoho, with a steam train substituted for the rest of the journey to New Plymouth.
- In August 1949, repeated slips on the bank overnight halted through traffic until track gangs cleared the line; a "Flyer" service and a following freight were both delayed.
- In June 1950, a railcar from Wellington to New Plymouth made two unsuccessful attempts to climb the grade before the service was cancelled north of Aramoho, with 41 passengers transferred to buses.

The difficulty of the grade also prompted lobbying to have it eased. In November 1944, a Wanganui civic conference identified the Westmere bank as the next obstacle to improved freight speeds, following completion of the Turakina–Okoia deviation. In May 1948, the Taranaki Local Bodies Association passed a resolution urging the same, on the grounds that easing the grade would allow heavier loads to be hauled between Wanganui and New Plymouth. Neither campaign led to a deviation, and the grade remained in place for the rest of the line's operating life.

== Notable events ==
On 5 October 1920, Wanganui's first aeroplane flight, piloted by Captain Russell from Wellington, landed in a paddock near Westmere railway station, with passenger flights subsequently offered from the site.

On 22 September 1928, the trans-Tasman aviators, including Squadron Leader Kingsford Smith, made a brief stop at Westmere on their return flight from Auckland to Wellington, landing at the Wanganui Jockey Club's grounds nearby. A special train ran from Wanganui to Westmere for the reception, picking up passengers at St John's and Aramoho, with buses also laid on by the City Council.

== Present day ==
No station buildings survive on the site. A pair of iron gateposts, likely remnants of the station yard, remain visible from the road amid wild fennel, though a heritage trail signpost that once directed visitors to the station site had itself disappeared by 2024.

The location remains an active location for train control on the Marton–New Plymouth line, listed by KiwiRail as the "Westmere Intermediate Board" at approximately 49.98 km. The Westmere Bank remains subject to a load limit, normally 1200 tonnes, and is still described as the steepest sustained grade on the North Island's railway network.

== See also ==
- Marton–New Plymouth line
- Whanganui
