= Waipipi Wind Farm =

Wind farm in New Zealand

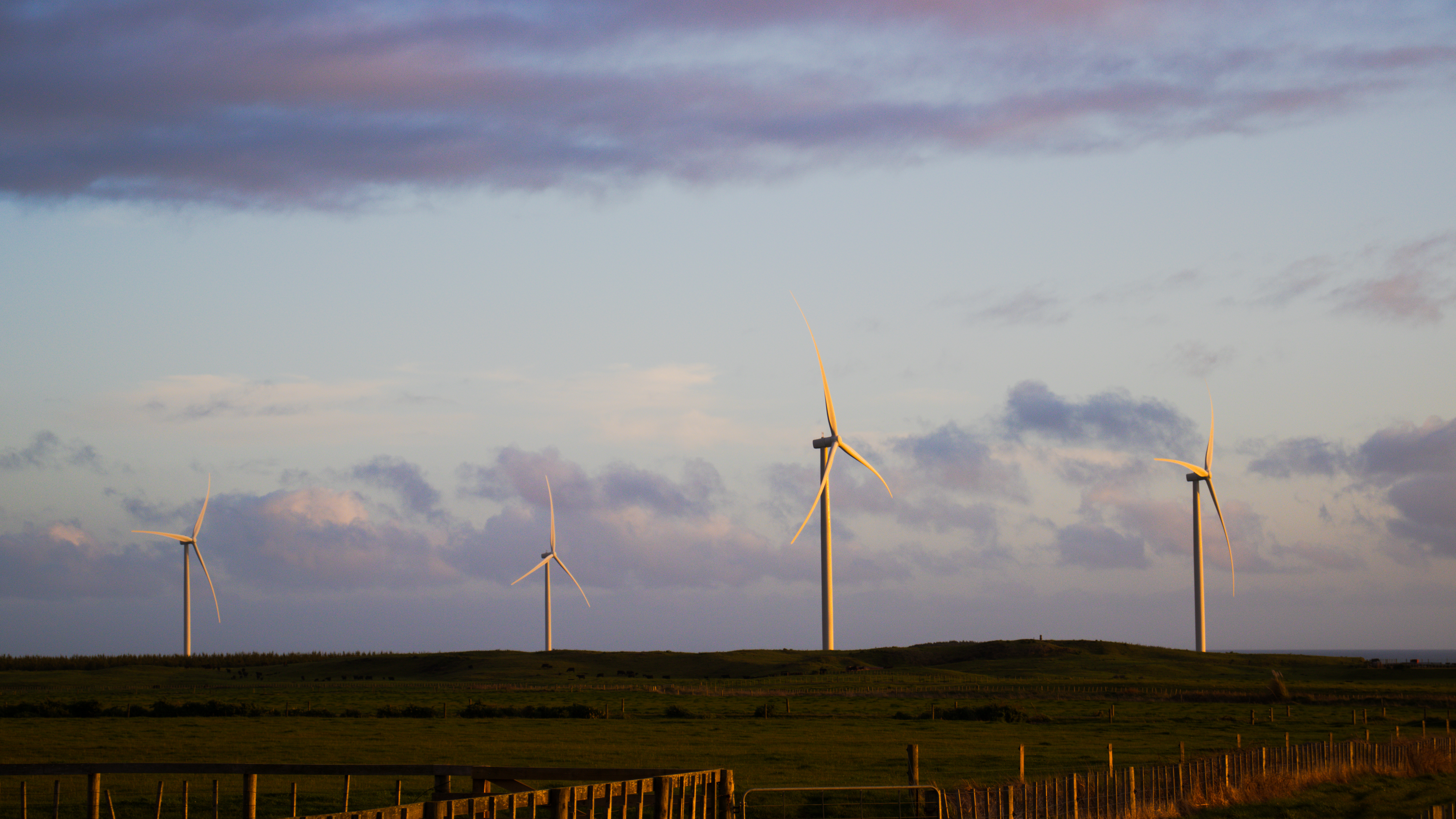
- Waipipi Wind Farm turbines showing the curved blades
- Country: New Zealand
- Location: near Waverley, New Zealand
- Coordinates: 39°47′S 174°33′E
- Status: Operational
- Construction began: 2019
- Commission date: 2021
- Construction cost: NZ$227 million
- Owner: Mercury NZ Ltd
- Operator: Tilt Renewables

Thermal power station
- Primary fuel: Wind power

Wind farm
- Type: Onshore
- Hub height: 95 m (312 ft)
- Rotor diameter: 130 m (430 ft)
- Site area: 700 Ha

Power generation
- Units operational: 31
- Make and model: Siemens Gamesa 4.3MW
- Nameplate capacity: 133 MW
- Annual net output: 455 GWh

The Waipipi Wind Farm is a wind powered electricity generation project in New Zealand owned and operated by Mercury NZ Ltd. This site is located between Pātea and Waverley in South Taranaki. The wind farm consists of 31 wind turbines over 980 hectares, generating up to 133 MW at a cost of approximately $277 million. The 4.3 MW machines are the largest wind turbines installed in New Zealand.

== History ==
The Waverley wind farm project was initially proposed in 2007 by Allco Wind Energy but development ceased in 2009 when Allco was put into receivership.

The project was acquired by Trustpower in 2010 and further developed in 2012. The application for resource consents was lodged with South Taranaki District Council and the Taranaki Regional Council in 2016. It was approved in July 2017. The final investment decision to proceed with the project was taken in August 2019.

Site work started with a sod-turning ceremony on 1 November 2019. The turbine components were shipped from Denmark and China, arriving at Port Taranaki in May 2020. The components were then transported by road to Waipipi. On 2 June 2020, the truck carrying the first turbine blade lost control and tipped over at Ōkato; the driver was uninjured and the blade suffered only minor damage.

The first four turbines were commissioned and started contributing power to the national grid on 16 November 2020. All turbines were commissioned by early 2021. The windfarm was officially opened in June 2021.

== Equipment ==
The wind farm uses 31 Siemens Gamesa turbines, each with a 130 m rotor diameter and rated at 4.3 MW.

An 11 km (7 mi) transmission line connects the wind farm to the national grid at Transpower's Waverley substation.

== See also ==
- Wind power in New Zealand
- Electricity sector in New Zealand
