= Maxwell railway station =

Railway station in New Zealand

Maxwell

General information
- Location: New Zealand
- Coordinates: 39.85397°S 174.86714°E
- Elevation: 66 m (217 ft)
- Line: Marton–New Plymouth line
- Platforms: Single side
- Tracks: 1

Construction
- Structure type: At-grade, timber

History
- Opened: 20 September 1880; 146 years ago
- Closed: 31 May 1976; 50 years ago (passengers); 3 September 1978; 48 years ago (freight)
- Former names: Okehu (to 1 August 1927)
Location
Notes
- Previous Station: Kai Iwi Station; Next Station: Nukumaru Station

Maxwell railway station (originally Okehu railway station) was a railway station on the Marton–New Plymouth line (then the Wanganui–Patea Railway), serving the locality now known as Pākaraka, near Whanganui. It opened on 20 September 1880 and was renamed from Okehu to Maxwell in 1927; it closed to passengers in 1976 and completely in 1978.

== History ==
=== Construction and opening ===
The valley through which the station would eventually be built was already known to railway surveyors by August 1871, when engineer James Hogg reported to the Public Works Department that his survey of the proposed Wanganui–Patea line had reached the Okehu Valley, about 11½ miles from Wanganui. Construction proceeded under the Waitotara Contract, and the section from Kai Iwi opened to public traffic on 20 September 1880, with Okehu among the stations served. A postal tender notice from that same period listed "Maxwelltown Post Office and Railway Platform, Okehu" as a proposed daily mail service, indicating the site was already understood as the railway's connection point for the nearby settlement of Maxwelltown even as the line neared completion.

=== Facilities ===
By the mid-1890s Okehu had a station building, a passenger platform on the left side of the line, a cart approach, a 40 by 30 foot goods shed, a loading bank, cattle and sheep yards, a stationmaster's house and urinals. Sheep loading accommodation was reported on in May 1893, and footpaths along the line at "Okehu flag station" were requested in August 1888. A stationary hand crane and water service were added by 1904, along with fixed signals. The crossing loop was lengthened in February 1915, and again in January 1927, shortly before the station's renaming.

The railway's approach to the station from the east was operationally difficult. An 1894 investigation into easing grades on the Wellington–Taranaki line examined a possible deviation between Kai Iwi and Okehu, where the existing route climbed at 1 in 40, descended at 1 in 38, and climbed again toward the station at 1 in 46½; the alternative considered included a roughly 30-chain tunnel, estimated at £50,000, but was not built. A new railway ballast pit was opened at Okehu in 1895 as part of main line improvements. Cattle yards were erected at the station during the year ending 31 March 1925, among a number of similar additions to open lines that year.

Completion of a bridge over the lower Okehu Stream in January 1923 opened Handley Road to traffic, providing a direct link between the station and Rapanui.

=== Renaming: Okehu to Maxwell ===
By the mid-1920s, locals had come to view the railway station's name, Okehu, as a source of confusion with the similarly named Okoia, southeast of Wanganui. In June 1925 F. Handley proposed to the Maxwelltown branch of the Farmers' Union that the station be renamed; in 1926, residents of Maxwelltown and Okehu petitioned the Railway Board for the change, and the Honorary Geographic Board agreed at its 30 August 1926 hui. Separately, the township itself was renamed from Maxwelltown to Maxwell, effective 27 January 1927. The station's own renaming from Okehu to Maxwell took effect on 1 August 1927, "so as to be uniform with the township." The Geographic Board's decision was formally gazetted as an official name only in 1948, under the requirements of the New Zealand Geographic Board Act 1946.

=== Staffing and operations ===
Thomas Roche, officer in charge of the station, died in May 1902 of tuberculosis contracted after exposure to weather during a railway accident at Kakaramea some eighteen months earlier; he had served in the Railways Department for over twenty years and left a widow and seven children. Henry Winter was recorded as tablet porter at Maxwell in January 1928, residing with his family at the station. In 1936 Maxwell was converted to switch-out tablet working under a special arrangement extending the block over three ordinary sections, rather than the usual one. R. H. P. Boswell was recorded as tablet porter at Maxwell in wartime manpower appeal proceedings in May 1942.

A Wanganui–Opunake excursion train called at Maxwell in both directions on 4 March 1939, indicating the station remained an established passenger stop. Mail continued to be carried to Maxwell by rail as late as 1950, when the local MP proposed substituting road transport to improve the service's speed. In July 1950 the Wanganui Provincial Executive of Federated Farmers complained about the poor condition of the station's stock loading yards, describing them as ankle-deep in mud with gates and fences wired shut.

=== Incidents ===
A station-hand named Thomas Carroll was struck and killed by a train near the Okehu bridge in May 1881 while walking home along the line. In April 1886, an engine's driving-wheel axle broke near Okehu, derailing the front wheels and blocking the line for several hours, though the engine itself remained on the track and no other damage was reported. A collision occurred at the station in March 1914 when an inbound train ran into a stationary train standing on an adjoining line while shunting, derailing a wagon and partially derailing a guard's van; several standing passengers were thrown off their feet. A platelayer had a narrow escape in February 1925 when he was forced to jump clear of his jigger as a special train rounded a curve near the station, the jigger being smashed by the engine. A washout at a culvert a mile south of Maxwell delayed the New Plymouth–Wellington express by nearly three hours in July 1931, with passengers transferred to cars for onward travel.

=== Tewkesbury: a planned township ===
In the early 1880s, landowner John Handley laid out a subdivided township named Tewkesbury immediately adjoining the Okehu railway station, on part of Blocks 51 and 52 of the Waitotara County survey. By 1893 the wider Okehu Estate, of around 800 acres, was advertised for sale with Tewkesbury "located in the centre of the property," its proximity to the Okehu railway station cited as a specific selling point, alongside a proposed dairy creamery. The anticipated development boom did not materialise: a 1939 retrospective recalled that Tewkesbury's quarter-acre sections, originally sold for £60–£70 each, were later bought back by the original vendor for around £10 apiece. By 1918, the Waitotara County Council was forced to auction eight sections for unpaid rates, buying two itself and selling the remainder for between £16 and £55.

=== Proposed coastal deviation ===
From at least 1923, various schemes were floated to avoid the steep Brunswick Hill grade on the approach to Wanganui by diverting the line closer to the coast via Okehu. The most developed of these, promoted by Wanganui businessman W. Draffin and taken up by the Wanganui Tourist and Development League, proposed a deviation of the Wellington–New Plymouth line beginning at Turakina, running along the coast through Putiki, Springvale, Rapanui and Kai Iwi before rejoining the existing line at Maxwell. The scheme was taken seriously enough that the general manager of railways personally inspected the proposed route with commercial and engineering staff in October 1937, though its adoption would have meant abandoning concurrent construction work on the Turakina–Okoia deviation, on which £500,000 was already committed. The scheme was not adopted.

=== Closure and future use ===
Maxwell closed to passenger traffic on 31 May 1976 and closed completely on 3 September 1978. By 1990, only a shelter shed remained at the site, with no platform or sidings. A 2017 Whanganui District Council report noted that a recent proposal for a log-transhipment depot at the site of the former station had not proceeded, owing to a lack of agreement from the adjoining landowner.

== Current state ==
Nothing of the former station survives today, including the shelter shed still present in 1990; the site sits on Maxwell Station Road, alongside the still-active Marton–New Plymouth line. The road itself retains the "Maxwell Station" name despite the 2022 renaming of the nearby locality to Pākaraka and the discontinuation of "Maxwell Railway Station" as an official geographic name that same year, the Geographic Board having noted the feature no longer existed.

== See also ==
- Marton–New Plymouth line
- Pākaraka
