= Ngamatapouri =

Rural locality in Taranaki Region, New Zealand

- Interactive map of Ngamatapouri
- Coordinates: 39°34′24″S 174°49′29″E
- Country: New Zealand
- Region: Taranaki
- Territorial authority: South Taranaki District
- Ward: Pātea General Ward; Te Tai Tonga Māori Ward
- Community: Pātea Community
- Electorates: Whanganui; Te Tai Hauāuru (Māori)

Government
  - Territorial Authority: South Taranaki District Council
  - Regional council: Taranaki Regional Council
  - Mayor of South Taranaki: Phil Nixon
  - Whanganui MP: Carl Bates
  - Te Tai Hauāuru MP: Debbie Ngarewa-Packer

Ngamatapouri is a small rural locality in the Waitōtara River valley, 47 km north of Waitōtara village, in south Taranaki, New Zealand. Whanganui is about 80 km to the southeast. The road is sealed as far as the school.

The New Zealand Ministry for Culture and Heritage gives a translation of "the black teals" for Ngāmatapōuri.

Community life centres on Ngamatapouri School. The area is predominantly reliant on sheep and beef pastoral farming.

== Demographics ==
Ngamatapouri is in Mangawhio statistical area, which covers 1,368.63 km^{2} (528.43 sq mi) and had an estimated population of 730 as of June 2025, with a population density of 0.53 people per km^{2}.

Historical population for Mangawhio
Year	Pop.	±% p.a.
2006	729	—
2013	747	+0.35%
2018	723	−0.65%
2023	702	−0.59%

Mangawhio had a population of 702 in the 2023 New Zealand census, a decrease of 21 people (−2.9%) since the 2018 census, and a decrease of 45 people (−6.0%) since the 2013 census. There were 384 males, 315 females, and 3 people of other genders in 288 dwellings. 1.7% of people identified as LGBTIQ+. The median age was 38.1 years (compared with 38.1 years nationally). There were 147 people (20.9%) aged under 15 years, 126 (17.9%) aged 15 to 29, 333 (47.4%) aged 30 to 64, and 96 (13.7%) aged 65 or older.

People could identify as more than one ethnicity. The results were 91.0% European (Pākehā); 15.8% Māori; 2.6% Pasifika; 2.1% Asian; 0.4% Middle Eastern, Latin American and African New Zealanders (MELAA); and 4.3% other, which includes people giving their ethnicity as "New Zealander". English was spoken by 97.9%, Māori by 3.4%, Samoan by 0.4%, and other languages by 3.0%. No language could be spoken by 1.7% (e.g. too young to talk). New Zealand Sign Language was known by 0.4%. The percentage of people born overseas was 7.7, compared with 28.8% nationally.

Religious affiliations were 30.8% Christian, 0.4% Māori religious beliefs, 0.4% Buddhist, and 0.4% New Age. People who answered that they had no religion were 59.4%, and 8.5% of people did not answer the census question.

Of those at least 15 years old, 72 (13.0%) people had a bachelor's or higher degree, 327 (58.9%) had a post-high school certificate or diploma, and 153 (27.6%) people exclusively held high school qualifications. The median income was $42,300, compared with $41,500 nationally. 48 people (8.6%) earned over $100,000 compared to 12.1% nationally. The employment status of those at least 15 was 321 (57.8%) full-time, 78 (14.1%) part-time, and 21 (3.8%) unemployed.

== Education ==
Ngamatapouri School is a coeducational full primary (years 1–8) school with a roll of 3 as of July 2025. The school opened about 1900 as Marohema School, and was later called Makakaho Junction School.
