= Kai Iwi railway station =

Railway station in New Zealand

Kai Iwi

General information
- Location: New Zealand
- Coordinates: 39.84822°S 174.92717°E
- Elevation: 40 m (130 ft)
- Line: Marton–New Plymouth line
- Platforms: Single side
- Tracks: 1

Construction
- Structure type: At-grade, timber

History
- Opened: 28 June 1879; 147 years ago
- Closed: 31 May 1976; 50 years ago (passengers); 22 September 1986; 40 years ago (freight)
- Rebuilt: 8 October 1975; 51 years ago
Location
Notes
- Previous Station: Westmere Station; Next Station: Okehu / Maxwell Station

Kai Iwi railway station is a railway location on the Marton–New Plymouth line near Whanganui. It opened on 28 June 1879 as the northern railhead of the line, closed to passengers in 1976 and to regular freight in 1986, but its crossing loop was reinstated in 1998 and remains part of the operating network today.

== History ==
=== Construction and opening ===
Tenders for the station buildings were called in December 1878, and the contract, won by Alex Tawse, was signed on 29 December. The Public Works Department's 1879 annual report records the associated Brunswick plate-laying contract, extending the railway 9 miles 15 chains north from Aramoho to Kai Iwi, as completed on 22 May 1879; the station buildings and water supply were finished in time for opening. A water supply dam associated with the station drew a formal objection from a Mr Oakes (recorded elsewhere in the same file as "Oakden") in April 1879.

The Aramoho–Kai Iwi section opened for traffic on 28 June 1879. According to a contemporary account, the general manager received instructions to open the line "forthwith" only the previous Friday; with almost no notice and in poor weather, just three passengers travelled to Kai Iwi on the first train and two made the return journey. A week later, the Wanganui Chronicle reported the transfer of Mr Cottam, formerly stationed at Palmerston, to Kai Iwi; the Manawatu Times described the posting as a "most forlorn and desolate locality."

=== Railhead and coach interchange, 1879–80 ===
Construction did not stop at Kai Iwi: the Kai Iwi–Waitōtara contract, 12 miles 70 chains long, was already around three-quarters complete when the earlier section opened, with roughly a further fourteen months' work remaining before it in turn opened on 20 September 1880. For that period, Kai Iwi functioned as the line's northern terminus and a rail–coach interchange. Cobb & Co coaches that ran to Wanganui now advertised that passengers could leave Whanganui by train at 6 a.m., reaching Kai Iwi at 6.45, and transferring at 7 a.m. to coach services running north to Maxwell, Waitōtara, Waverley, Pātea, Kakaramea, Manutahi, Hāwera, Normanby and Stratford, timed to connect with the railway in both directions.

=== Facilities ===
By 1896 Kai Iwi had a 5th class station building, passenger platform, cart approach, a 40 by 30 foot goods shed, loading bank, cattle yards, water service, a stationmaster's house and urinals. Cattle yards had been recommended a decade earlier, in 1886, along with a recommendation for telephone communication with Aramoho in the same period; a telephone connecting Kai Iwi and Brunswick stations with Aramoho was confirmed installed by April 1899. Sheep yards and a crane were added by 1898, and that September approval was given for a weighing machine, a crane and additions to the goods shed. A 4,000-gallon water vat was authorised in October 1899. Further land was taken for railway purposes in 1892.

From December 1899, part of the station building was converted for use as a Post and Telegraph office, with the alteration recorded as complete in February 1900. The Post and Telegraph Department's own 1901 report refers to the "Kai Iwi Post Office Railway Station," corroborating the arrangement independently of the railway's own records. The station building itself was lengthened 16 feet in August 1901, and from 2 September that year it was placed in the charge of a resident stationmaster and opened for railway, postal and telegraph business together. A further 15-foot extension followed on 16 June 1914, meaning the building had grown by at least 31 feet beyond its original 1879 construction. Water supply was improved in June 1913, and siding accommodation and the stationmaster's house were both improved in 1914; a May 1914 file note also records a semaphore signal found showing "clear" while its lever remained locked at "danger."

==== Shell rock, ballast and road metal ====
A siding to a shell-rock deposit near Kai Iwi was proposed in July 1900 and recorded again in 1905, and a dedicated ballast pit followed in 1907. The connection was substantial enough to be individually authorised by Parliament: the Railways Authorisation Act 1907 specifically authorised the "Foxton–New Plymouth (Kai Iwi Ballast-pit Siding)," a branch line from Kai Iwi to Sections 6K and 5C, Block XV, Nukumaru Survey District, about two and a quarter miles in length. Material drawn from the pit continued to supply local roadworks decades later: in 1925 the Waitotara County Council called tenders to cart around 250 cubic yards of crushed metal from Kai Iwi railway station onto Kai Iwi Valley Road.

=== Community role ===
The station developed into something of a local focal point beyond its railway functions. An 1896 account discussing relocation of the Goat Valley school proposed a site around 30 chains from the station, partly because a train stopped at Kai Iwi each morning before 9 a.m., and placed the Wanganui Friendly Society's annual picnic ground within about five minutes' walk of it. When stationmaster L. W. Hawkins was promoted to Hillside in 1916, the Wanganui Chronicle remarked that Kai Iwi settlers would regret losing an "obliging and courteous officer."

=== The 1894 deviation proposal ===
Difficult grades on the approach to Kai Iwi prompted a formal deviation proposal in 1894. Engineer C. E. Reynolds examined the Kai Iwi–Okehu section, where the existing line climbed at about 1 in 40, descended at 1 in 38, and climbed again toward Okehu at roughly 1 in 46 1/2. His proposed alternative, incorporating a roughly 30-chain tunnel and a maximum 1-in-70 grade, would have relocated Kai Iwi station itself around 30 chains inland and 10–15 feet higher, at an estimated cost of £50,000. The scheme was not built.

==== Dairy traffic ====
The Kai Iwi Co-operative Dairy Company purchased the local cheese factory in 1915, adding a curing room and beginning cheesemaking on 4 October that year; by 1925 the company reported manufacturing 94 tons of cheese for the season. The Railways Department's 1939 freight tariff specifically listed cheese and butter carried from Kai Iwi to Wanganui at 8s 10d per ton, confirming dairy produce as part of the station's regular freight.

==== Withdrawal of staff ====
Responsibility for the station's post office passed from Railways Department to Postal Department staff from 1 January 1929, and Kai Iwi ceased to be an officered railway station on 25 May 1929; the post office itself was removed from the station in September 1933. Despite the loss of resident staff, the station continued in active use: electric lighting was installed at the station, yard and signals in 1930, and the station still carried significant freight traffic, including dairy produce, decades later.

==== Slips and deviations ====
The steep grades around Kai Iwi caused repeated engineering difficulty. On 28 June 1929, an embankment carrying the line between Westmere and Kai Iwi subsided beneath a passing train, taking the engine and several wagons down with it toward a creek bed; a temporary deviation restored traffic after about 15 hours. A far larger landslide struck the Kai Iwi bank in August 1949, prompting five bulldozers and four mechanical shovels to be brought in to cut a foundation for replacement permanent way; personnel and machinery were diverted from concurrent railway improvement works at Aramoho to complete the Kai Iwi deviation, which was finished before the Aramoho work resumed the following month.

=== Incidents ===
A Mrs Guard was injured in 1887 attempting to board a moving train as it left the station, falling between the platform and a carriage and suffering broken toes; the driver stopped the train immediately. In March 1905, 23-year-old Arthur Cutfield was fatally injured after leaving his train, which had been placed in a siding to let the mail train pass, to retrieve his dog from the line; he was struck by the passing mail train and later died in hospital.

=== Fire and rebuilding ===
The original station building, by then substantially altered and extended since 1879, was totally destroyed by fire on 26 July 1972. Approval to relocate the former Bunnythorpe station building to Kai Iwi as a replacement was given on 24 January 1975, and the transfer took place on 8 October 1975.

=== Closure and reopening as a crossing loop ===
Kai Iwi closed to passenger traffic on 31 May 1976. Facilities were progressively reduced thereafter: by February 1983 only a small station building and passenger platform remained alongside the crossing loop and a northern backshunt, and from 10 July 1983 the station was closed to all traffic except goods carried in wagon lots. Kai Iwi closed completely on 22 September 1986. By September 1990 the crossing loop itself had been removed, though the high- and low-level loading banks survived after the sidings were gone.

The station building and platform were still extant in June 1998, and a new 700-metre crossing loop opened there the following month, restoring Kai Iwi to the operating network. KiwiRail's current operating instructions confirm Kai Iwi remains a "warrant station" on the line today, with 594 metres of standing room in the loop and an 80-metre service siding. On 26 November 2000, the northbound Longburn–Whareroa milk train derailed near Kai Iwi after entering a curve about 25 km/h faster than its authorised 50 km/h limit, with ten loaded milk-tanker wagons leaving the track; the Transport Accident Investigation Commission found the locomotive engineer had experienced a microsleep, with no injuries resulting.

=== Tunnel bypass 2008 ===
By the early 2000s, the restricted loading gauge of Tunnel No. 4 near Kai Iwi had become a constraint on freight movements, limiting high-cube ISO containers and oversize loads on the line. A realignment bypassing the tunnel was constructed and completed in 2008.

== Current state ==
The former Bunnythorpe station building remains standing on the platform at Kai Iwi, beside the active crossing loop.

== See also ==
- Marton–New Plymouth line
