= Howard Lake-Waverly-Winsted High School =

Coordinates: 45.0281°N 94.0662°W

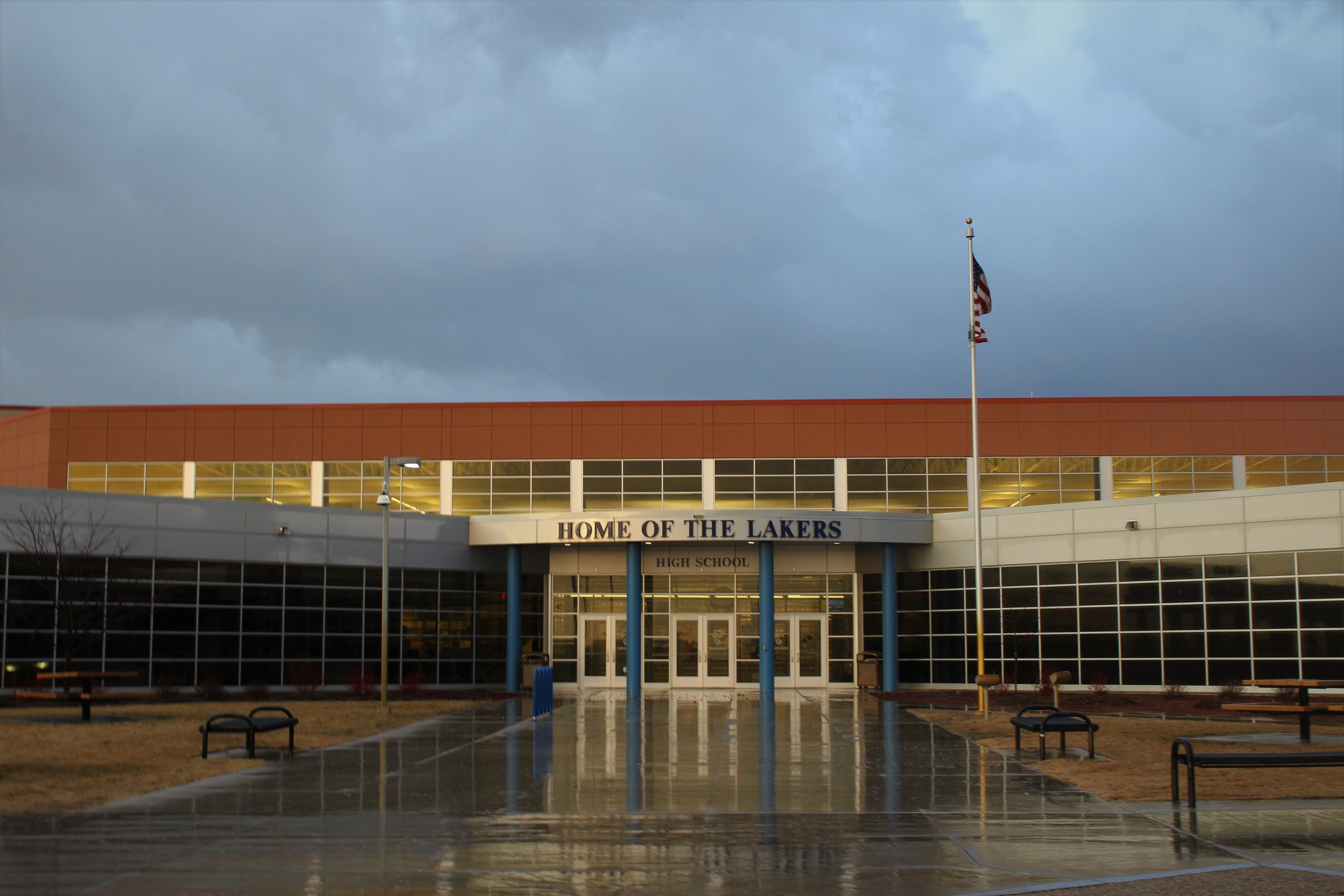

Location
- 8700 County Road 6 SW; Howard Lake, Wright, Minnesota 55349; United States

Information
- School type: Public School
- Motto: Excellence Through Education
- School district: Howard Lake-Waverly-Winsted Public Schools
- Superintendent: Dan Edwards
- NCES School ID: 270012300751
- Principal: Stephanie Kuehn
- Staff: 21.36 (FTE)
- Grades: 9–12
- Enrollment: 399 (2023-2024)
- Student to teacher ratio: 18.68
- Colours: Navy and gold
- Athletics conference: Wright County West Conference
- Team name: Lakers
- Website: hlww.k12.mn.us

Howard Lake-Waverly-Winsted High School (HLWW HS) is located just south of Howard Lake, Minnesota, United States. The Public High School enrolls 9th–12th Graders in the Howard Lake-Waverly-Winsted Public School District. As of 2019, the school had 315 students enrolled. The campus consists of the High School, complete with a Gymnasium, the Laker Theater, the Middle School, with a field house housing three full-court basketball courts, a walking track, a weight room; a Football Field; the Track; several Baseball Fields; a School Garden; and the District's Bus Garage.

== History ==
The previous building was built in 1930 and located in the city of Howard Lake. It had additions built in 1947 and 1954, as well as the addition of Humphrey Hall (named after former Vice President Hubert H. Humphrey a resident of Waverly) in 1966. In its latter years it served as the middle school for the school district after the new high school was constructed after an extensive fire in 1975. But due to the expensive repairs that were needed, a new middle school was built and the old complex demolished with the exception of the Humphrey Hall area, which was renovated. That portion of the school is now home to the Meeker and Wright Special Education Cooperative as well as the HLWW Alternative Learning Program. It still possesses its gymnasium which is attached to Humphrey Hall which is also used for the Laker gymnastics practices and home meets.

The current building is located between Howard Lake, Minnesota and Winsted, Minnesota. It was constructed in 2006 and connected to the Middle School in 2016.

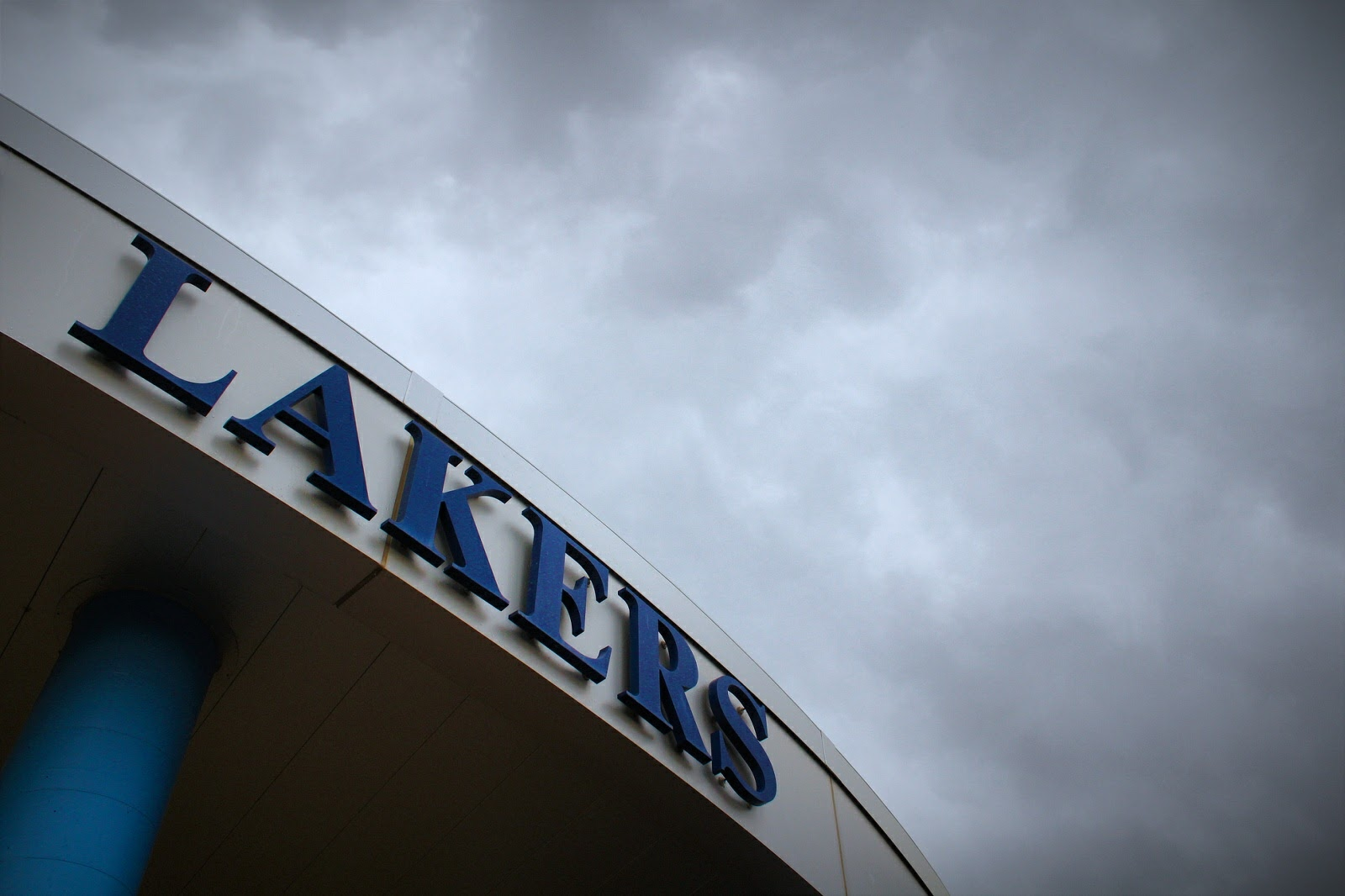
The Lakers text over the entrance of the building.

== Extracurricular activities ==
HLWW is a member of the Central Minnesota Conference and will join the Wright County West Conference in 2021. The HLWW School District offers the following activities.

Sports:

- Fall
  - Cross Country
  - Football
  - Volleyball
- Winter
  - Boys/Girls Basketball
  - Gymnastics
  - Wrestling
- Spring
  - Baseball/Softball
  - Golf
  - Track and Field

Other activities:

- Band
- Choir
- Cheerleading
- Clay Target
- Drama
- FFA
- KLKR Studios
- Knowledge Bowl
- Speech

== The Laker Theatre ==
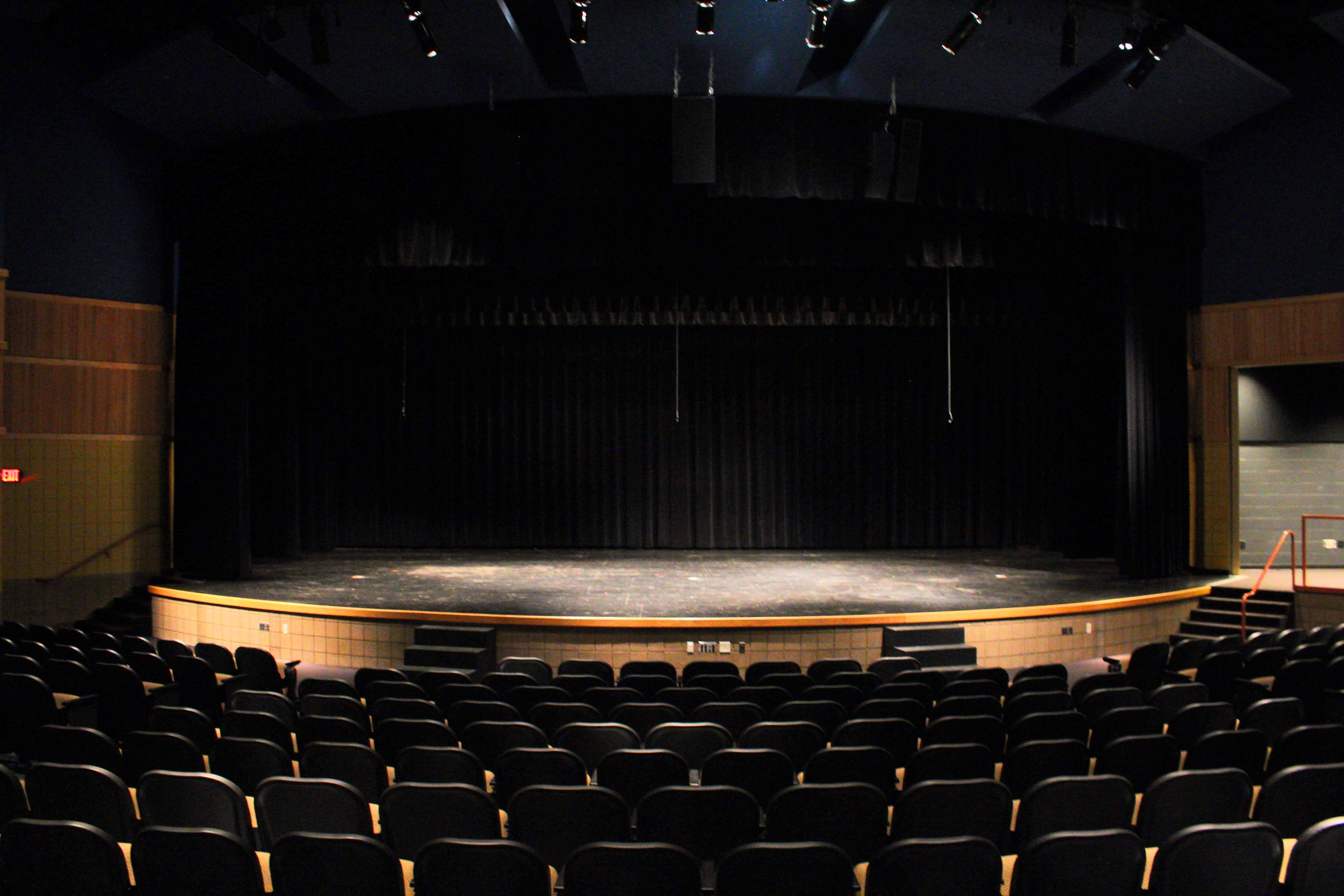
The Laker Stage, from the back of the auditorium with some of the stage lights turned on and an empty set.

The Laker Theatre is an Auditorium located within the high school, which hosts the school district's band and choir concerts, plays and musicals, as well as occasionally hosting community productions. The auditorium has a main floor which has a seating capacity of 458 seats, and a balcony, only accessible by stairs which can seat an additional 130 persons. The auditorium was built with the school but was not finished until 2009, the balcony of which was not finished until the Middle School was added to the complex.

== The Laker Gymnasium ==
The Laker Gymnasium has a main court with basketball lines and a main volleyball court in the middle of two roll-out bleachers. However, for some youth tournaments the gym can be converted to two courts by rolling back the bleachers and lowering a curtain which is above the half court line of the main court. There are motorized basketball hoops situated on the ceiling that can be raised and lowered depending on the requirements. The gym also has two Daktronics scoreboards which are used in tandem during main events but can be operated independently if the gym is separated to two courts. One of the scoreboards has additional side player panels which display additional information about active players during the game.

The gymnasium located adjacent to the Laker Theatre in the High School hosts the Laker's home Basketball and Volleyball games, as well as Wrestling meets. It will also occasionally be the host site of some playoff games however the location is not ideal because of a smaller seating capacity, therefore larger games are scheduled elsewhere.

== Campus ==
=== Laker Football Field and Track ===
The Laker Football Field and Track is a prominent fixture on campus, as athletic events which occur here attract spectators. It contains the football field encircled by the track, and has bleacher seating, a press box on top of the bleachers, a Daktronics, football scoreboard which can be switched to displaying track results, stadium lighting, and a basic loudspeaker system.

Early in 2019, a new, permanent concession stand was installed below the bleachers replacing a temporary trailer that had been previously used since the high school was built.

==== Football field ====
The natural grass football field on campus is a standard American football field, which is home to the Laker's Junior Varsity and Varsity home games. The field has irrigation lines which keeps the grass healthy during the summer. The football field's end zones and mid-field are typically painted with the Laker emblem with the help of volunteers. The team practices on a smaller field that is directly south of the stadium field and is irrigated as well.

==== Track ====
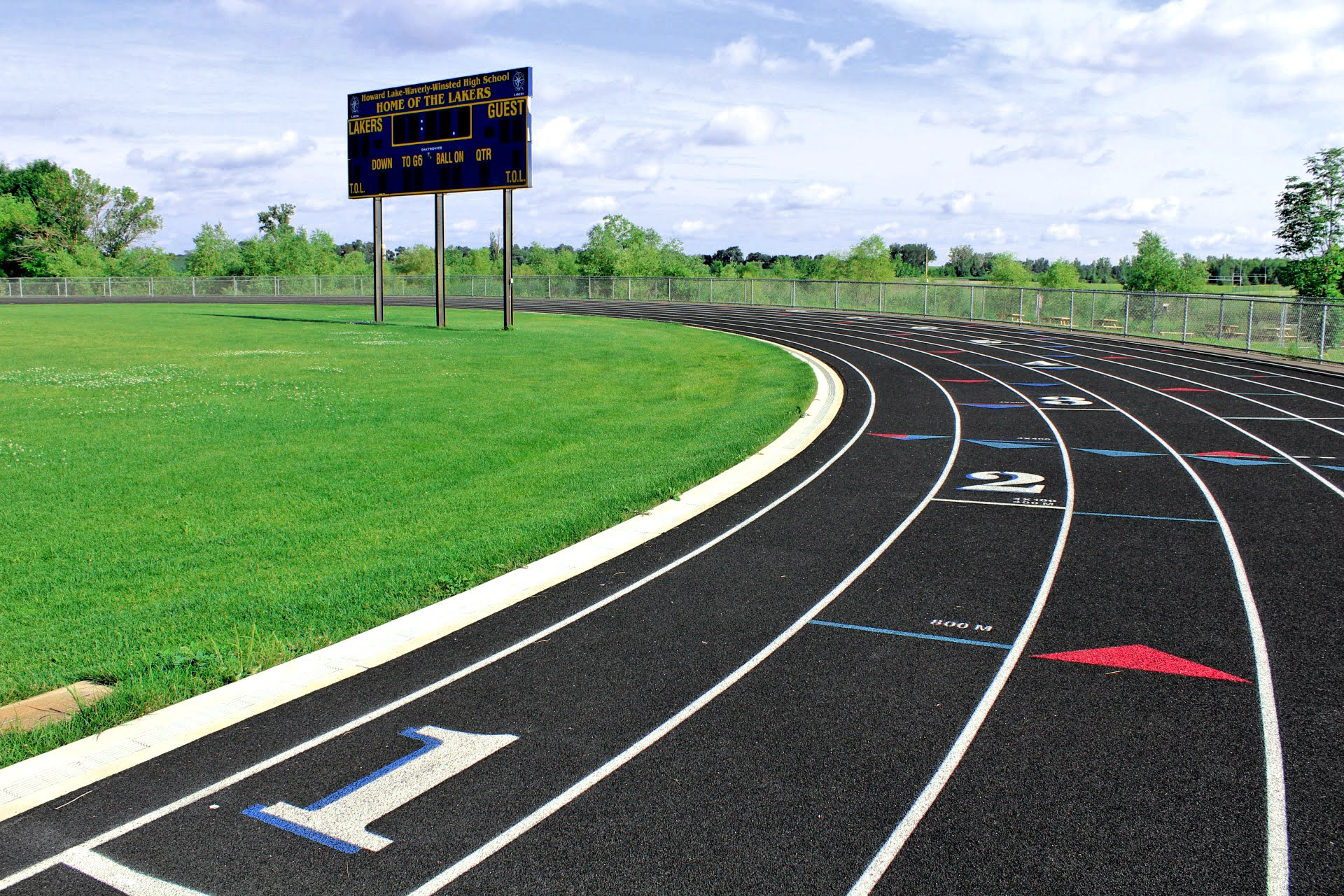
The 400 starting side of the Laker Track.

The Laker Track is a standard 400m track with a black rubber surface. The track has an additional space spanning the circle on the north end for high jump, and as an additional fenced-in area with three runways, two of which lead to triple and long jump pits, and one which has pole-vault capabilities. There are also sand traps for shot put in this area. Discus takes place on the football practice field on the northeast side of the campus.
