= Waverley High School, New Zealand =

Former high school in New Zealand

Waverley High School was a high school in the town of Waverley, Taranaki, New Zealand. The school, for years 7–13, closed on 20 April 2007.

The Whanganui Chronicle reported that the school opened in 1954, and added seventh form education in 1977. It had mentioned a school of the same name in 1943.

During its last four years, the school had a rapidly declining role and widespread absenteeism. On 3 April 2007, Education Minister Steve Maharey announced that the school was "no longer viable." He said the roll was too low to effectively provide the curriculum.

In December 2006, the school's ability to assess for NCEA was removed, due to the "unreliable" nature of its assessment.

The school was discussed in Parliament on 14 February 2007, when local MP Chester Borrows claimed that half the students were truant every day but not reported; the school had a teacher-pupil ratio of 1:8 and "everyone fails"; teachers only taught 3.5 days per week; the New Zealand Qualifications Authority had evidence of cheating by students and teachers; two-thirds of Waverley children were bussed to schools out of town rather than attend the school; there were are no remedial programmes for literacy and numeracy: "Whose head will roll for letting this community down so badly?"
