= Nukumaru railway station =

Railway station in New Zealand

Nukumaru

General information
- Location: New Zealand
- Coordinates: 39.83320°S 174.7906°E
- Elevation: 80 m (260 ft)
- Line: Marton–New Plymouth line
- Distance: 72.0 kilometres (44.7 mi) from Marton
- Platforms: Single side
- Tracks: 1

Construction
- Structure type: At-grade, timber

History
- Opened: 20 September 1880; 146 years ago
- Closed: 1 September 1968; 58 years ago (passengers); 11 September 1972; 54 years ago (freight)
Location
Notes
- Previous Station: Okehu / Maxwell Station; Next Station: Waitōtara Station

Nukumaru railway station was a flag station on the Marton–New Plymouth line (then the Wanganui–Patea Railway), in the locality of Nukumaru near Lake Waikato, New Zealand. The site lies at the boundary of the present-day (2026) Manawatū-Whanganui and Taranaki regions; the station itself was within Whanganui-Manawatū, but Taranaki begins immediately north and west of the station site. (Note: Based on the boundary as rendered by OpenStreetMap and Google Maps; no gazetted boundary description has been consulted to confirm this precisely.) It opened on 20 September 1880 and closed in stages between 1968 and 1972.

== History ==
=== Site dispute and construction ===
What would become Nukumaru railway station was established a little over a decade after New Zealand troops fought the nearby Battle of Nukumaru in January 1865, one of the engagements of Lieutenant-General Duncan Cameron's Second Taranaki War campaign.

As early as 1878, before construction had reached the area, a site for the station had not yet been settled: a reply from the Public Works Office to a memorial from local residents J. M. Thompson, William Parsons and others stated that no particular site had been fixed, and that public requirements would be considered before one was. In March 1878 a proposal to site the station at Marahau was strenuously objected to by petitioners, who argued a better site was available.

Tenders were let in 1878 to continue the line from Kai Iwi across the Waitōtara River, a distance of 13 miles 70 chains, even though the preceding contract from Aramoho to Kai Iwi had not yet been let. Messrs Collie, Scott and Wilkinson won the contract, for £39,791, but progress was dogged by bad weather and poor management; the firm's sureties, E. W. Mills and Co. of Wellington, engaged a Mr Whiting to manage construction and revive the project, and difficulty was also had sourcing ballast from a convenient source.

=== Opening ===
The station was established at the foot of the sand dunes near the junction of the railway with what is now the southern end of Nukumaru Station Road. It opened on 20 September 1880, the same day as the rest of the Kai Iwi–Waitōtara extension. As a flag station, it had no official opening ceremony, and despite the years of prior correspondence over its siting there was initially no road access to it at all. In December 1880 the Wanganui–Waitotara Highway Board was approached about forming an approach road, and in June 1881 tenders were called for the formation and fencing of the approach road to "Nukumaru Station." The road was apparently still not free of dispute the following year: a March 1882 letter to the editor concerning "The Nukumaru Station Road" saw a Mr W. F. Russell alleging the road crossed his private property without right, a claim its writer, Wm Lowes, disputed.

=== Facilities ===
Nukumaru's buildings were consistently described in Rail Heritage Trust archive entries as a "shelter shed" together with a passenger platform, cart approach, a 40 by 30 foot goods shed, a loading bank and sheep yards, established by the mid-1890s. A cart approach to the platform, initially lacking, was finally provided by 1897. One 1897 entry describes the station as "5th class," a term more usually applied to a numbered building-plan type rather than a plain shelter shed; (Note: The Rail Heritage Trust's own description of Ruru station, a comparable shelter shed, describes the type as "the successor to the class 7 station building," suggesting the numbered classification and the shelter-shed type were not always used with strict consistency.) elsewhere the same file notes are more consistent with a class 6 or lower type. Sheep yards were formally erected in 1897, and the yard's crossing loop and backshunt capacity was expanded several times between 1896 and 1911. A request for trucking yards was made in June 1914, and railway houses were built at the station in 1920.

Between 1894 and 1896, the Wanganui Town Clerk and later the Waitotara County Council both pressed for a siding to be provided at Nukumaru to open up a nearby "Shell Block Bed" for use as road-building material. A water service, established about three-quarters of a mile north of the station, was maintained there for decades.

=== Tablet working ===
In July 1919 a proposal was made to convert Nukumaru into a switch-out tablet station, followed by staff housing built in 1920. Tablet operations were operating till at least 1954; a photograph by Derek Cross shows a northbound train waiting in the loop for a southbound one to pass, with a note that the station agent had not yet set up the tablet for exchange with tablet exchange equipment clearly in view.

=== Staffing and decline ===
Nukumaru had at least one resident officer in charge: a Mr Anderson was given a farewell social function in June 1920 on his transfer to Hangatiki, on the Main Trunk line, having held charge of the station for a considerable time and being remembered as popular with local settlers. By October 1944, however, Nukumaru was recorded as an unofficered station: when a fire destroyed the contents of three wagons on a Wanganui–Hawera goods train as it approached the station around midnight, investigators had to travel out by car rather than rely on any station staff, the cause and extent of the loss being unascertainable until they arrived.

=== Closure ===
Nukumaru was closed to all traffic, including passengers, except goods in wagon lots from 1 September 1968, and closed completely on 11 September 1972.

== Naming of the approach road ==
The road leading to the station has been known by two names for much of its history, seemingly in parallel rather than in strict succession. Survey and cadastral records, including a 1929 Lands and Survey map, and a 1931 tender notice describing land "at the lower end of the Russell Road across the railway line," used the name Russell Road; this name may derive from a Mr W. F. Russell, recorded disputing a claim over land the road crossed in 1882. In everyday and official use, however, "Nukumaru Station Road" appears at least as early as 1946, and was used by the Waitotara County Council itself in a March 1947 resolution concerning pine trees on the road's reserve. Topographical maps continued to label the road Russell Road as late as 1999, only showing it as Nukumaru Station Road by 2009, decades after the name was already in common local and official use (and well after the actual station had closed). Following an extension completed in 2024, the road connecting to Waiinu Beach was given the official name Te Ranganuku.

== Legacy ==
Over twenty years after closure, the former station yard was still known and referred to by that name: a 1995 Transport Accident Investigation Commission report into an unrelated Hi-Rail vehicle collision near Maxwell records a maintenance worker searching for usable discarded rail at "the former Nukumaru Station yard," at the 72.0 km mark on the Marton–New Plymouth line, without success.

Today, the former station site remains fenced off; the line of bushes visible behind the station building in a 1954 photograph survives, but no trace of the station itself or the adjoining railway houses remains.

== See also ==
- Marton–New Plymouth line
