= Waverly School District =

Waverly School District may refer to:

- Waverly Community Schools, Michigan
- Waverly Community Unit School District 6, Illinois
- Waverly School District 145, Nebraska
- Waverly Central School District, New York
