= Waverley, Taranaki =

Settlement in Taranaki Region, New Zealand

Waverley
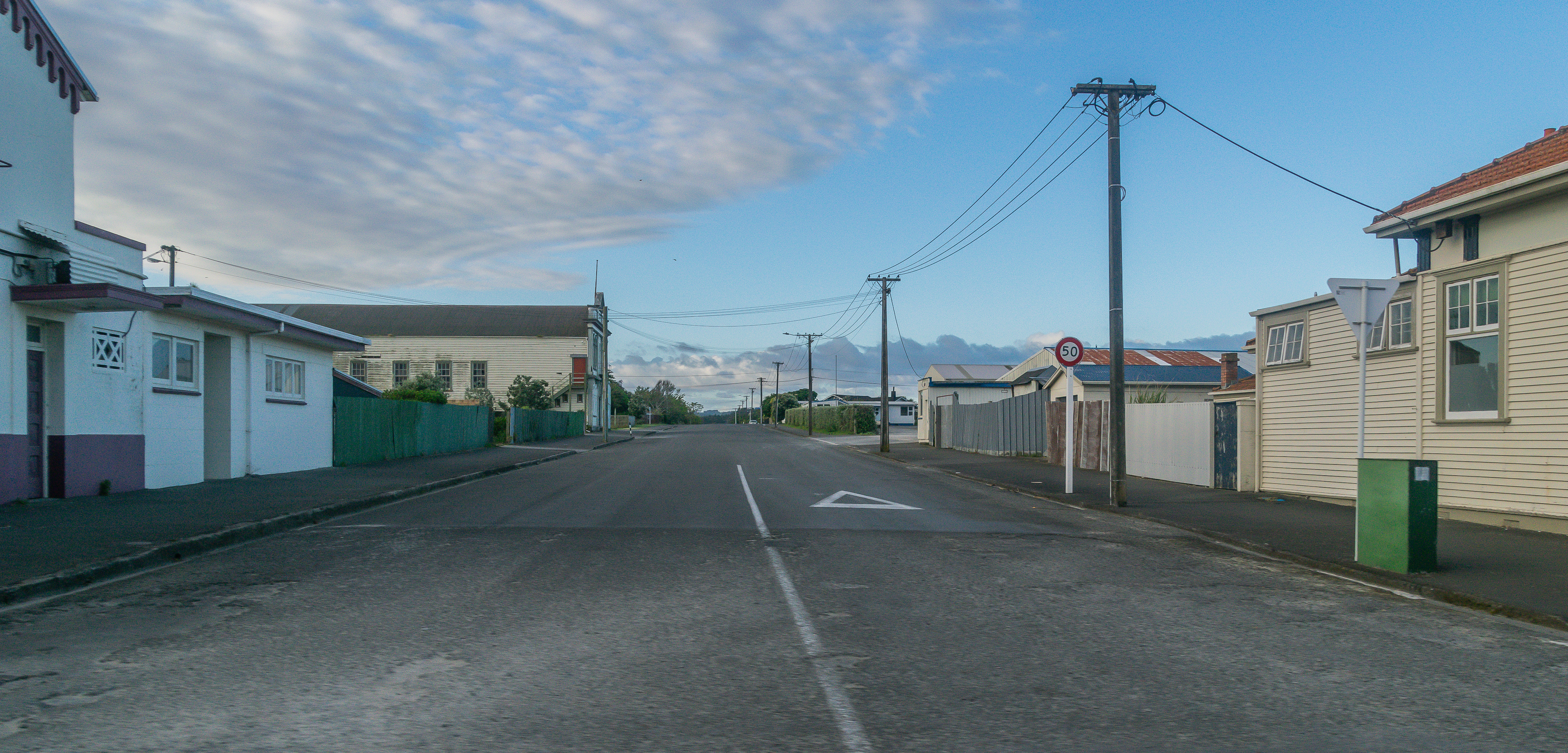
- Bear Street
- Interactive map of Waverley
- Coordinates: 39°45′40″S 174°37′48″E
- Country: New Zealand
- Region: Taranaki
- Territorial authority: South Taranaki District
- Ward: Pātea General Ward; Te Tai Tonga Māori Ward
- Community: Pātea Community
- Electorates: Whanganui; Te Tai Hauāuru (Māori)

Government
  - Territorial Authority: South Taranaki District Council
  - Regional council: Taranaki Regional Council
  - Mayor of South Taranaki: Phil Nixon
  - Whanganui MP: Carl Bates
  - Te Tai Hauāuru MP: Debbie Ngarewa-Packer

Area
  - Total: 2.28 km^{2} (0.88 sq mi)

Population (June 2025)
  - Total: 820
  - Density: 360/km^{2} (930/sq mi)

Waverley is a town located in the South Taranaki District in New Zealand. It is 44 km northwest of Whanganui. Pātea is 17 km to the west, and Waitōtara is 10 km to the southeast. State Highway 3 and the Marton–New Plymouth line railway run through the town.

== History and culture ==
Waverley was an important colonial stronghold during the New Zealand Wars of the 1860s, during which time the town was called Wairoa. The town is well known for its farming and thoroughbred stables. The race horse Kiwi was trained in the paddocks of a Waverley sheep farm by owner Snow Lupton and went on to go from last on the final bend to win the 1983 Melbourne Cup.

=== Marae ===
The local Te Wairoa-iti Marae and Maruata meeting house are a meeting place for Ngāti Tai, a hapū of Ngā Rauru Kītahi.

=== Ironsand mining and renewable energy ===
The Waipipi onshore ironsand mine operated near Waverley from 1971 to 1987, producing a total of 15.7 million tonnes of concentrate for export. The Waipipi site is now being developed for the Waipipi Wind Farm, with 31 turbines generating up to 133 MW.

== Demographics ==
Waverley is described by Stats NZ as a rural settlement, which covers 2.28 km^{2} (0.88 sq mi). It had an estimated population of 820 as of June 2025, with a population density of 360 people per km^{2}. It is part of the larger Manutahi-Waitotora statistical area.

Historical population for Waverley
| Year | Pop. | ±% p.a. |
|---|---|---|
| 2006 | 864 | — |
| 2013 | 798 | −1.13% |
| 2018 | 819 | +0.52% |
| 2023 | 831 | +0.29% |

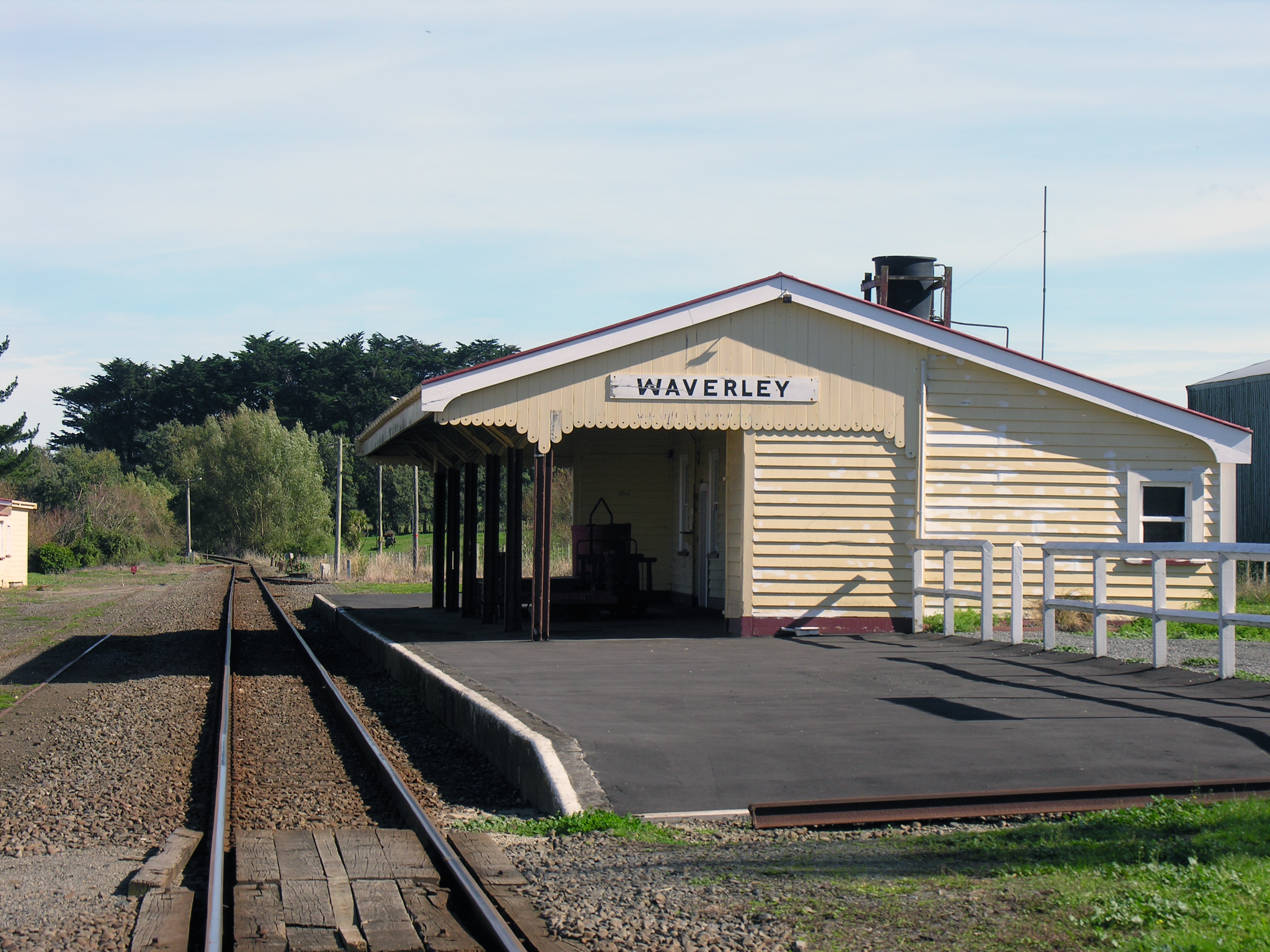
Waverley Railway Station on 22 April 2006.

Waverley had a population of 831 in the 2023 New Zealand census, an increase of 12 people (1.5%) since the 2018 census, and an increase of 33 people (4.1%) since the 2013 census. There were 435 males, 399 females, and 3 people of other genders in 381 dwellings. 2.2% of people identified as LGBTIQ+. The median age was 51.2 years (compared with 38.1 years nationally). There were 138 people (16.6%) aged under 15 years, 111 (13.4%) aged 15 to 29, 351 (42.2%) aged 30 to 64, and 231 (27.8%) aged 65 or older.

People could identify as more than one ethnicity. The results were 79.8% European (Pākehā); 31.8% Māori; 4.0% Pasifika; 1.8% Asian; 0.4% Middle Eastern, Latin American and African New Zealanders (MELAA); and 2.2% other, which includes people giving their ethnicity as "New Zealander". English was spoken by 97.8%, Māori by 6.9%, Samoan by 0.4%, and other languages by 3.6%. No language could be spoken by 1.8% (e.g. too young to talk). New Zealand Sign Language was known by 0.7%. The percentage of people born overseas was 8.3, compared with 28.8% nationally.

Religious affiliations were 28.9% Christian, 0.4% Hindu, 0.4% Islam, 1.1% Māori religious beliefs, 0.7% New Age, and 0.4% other religions. People who answered that they had no religion were 57.0%, and 11.6% of people did not answer the census question.

Of those at least 15 years old, 57 (8.2%) people had a bachelor's or higher degree, 381 (55.0%) had a post-high school certificate or diploma, and 252 (36.4%) people exclusively held high school qualifications. The median income was $26,700, compared with $41,500 nationally. 12 people (1.7%) earned over $100,000 compared to 12.1% nationally. The employment status of those at least 15 was 216 (31.2%) full-time, 93 (13.4%) part-time, and 30 (4.3%) unemployed.

=== Manutahi-Waitotora statistical area ===
Manutahi-Waitotora statistical area, which also includes Manutahi, Waitōtara and Waiinu Beach, covers 293.06 km^{2} (113.15 sq mi) and had an estimated population of 2,050 as of June 2025, with a population density of 7.0 people per km^{2}.

Historical population for Manutahi-Waitotora
| Year | Pop. | ±% p.a. |
|---|---|---|
| 2006 | 2,082 | — |
| 2013 | 1,962 | −0.84% |
| 2018 | 1,956 | −0.06% |
| 2023 | 2,013 | +0.58% |
The 2006 population is for a larger area of 293.22 km^{2}. Source:

Manutahi-Waitōtora had a population of 2,013 in the 2023 New Zealand census, an increase of 57 people (2.9%) since the 2018 census, and an increase of 51 people (2.6%) since the 2013 census. There were 1,062 males, 945 females, and 3 people of other genders in 885 dwellings. 1.8% of people identified as LGBTIQ+. The median age was 44.1 years (compared with 38.1 years nationally). There were 414 people (20.6%) aged under 15 years, 279 (13.9%) aged 15 to 29, 891 (44.3%) aged 30 to 64, and 429 (21.3%) aged 65 or older.

People could identify as more than one ethnicity. The results were 80.6% European (Pākehā); 25.0% Māori; 1.9% Pasifika; 4.6% Asian; 0.3% Middle Eastern, Latin American and African New Zealanders (MELAA); and 2.1% other, which includes people giving their ethnicity as "New Zealander". English was spoken by 97.3%, Māori by 6.6%, Samoan by 0.1%, and other languages by 4.0%. No language could be spoken by 2.1% (e.g. too young to talk). New Zealand Sign Language was known by 0.6%. The percentage of people born overseas was 9.2, compared with 28.8% nationally.

Religious affiliations were 32.5% Christian, 0.3% Hindu, 0.1% Islam, 1.3% Māori religious beliefs, 0.7% Buddhist, 0.7% New Age, and 0.6% other religions. People who answered that they had no religion were 54.8%, and 8.8% of people did not answer the census question.

Of those at least 15 years old, 171 (10.7%) people had a bachelor's or higher degree, 903 (56.5%) had a post-high school certificate or diploma, and 528 (33.0%) people exclusively held high school qualifications. The median income was $33,900, compared with $41,500 nationally. 96 people (6.0%) earned over $100,000 compared to 12.1% nationally. The employment status of those at least 15 was 696 (43.5%) full-time, 219 (13.7%) part-time, and 54 (3.4%) unemployed.

== Features ==
Waverley had a large sawmill which employed 65 staff. The mill was the only major sawmill as far as New Plymouth in the north and Levin in the south.The mill closed in 2019. There is a large hydroponic Lettuce farm operating in Waverley now.

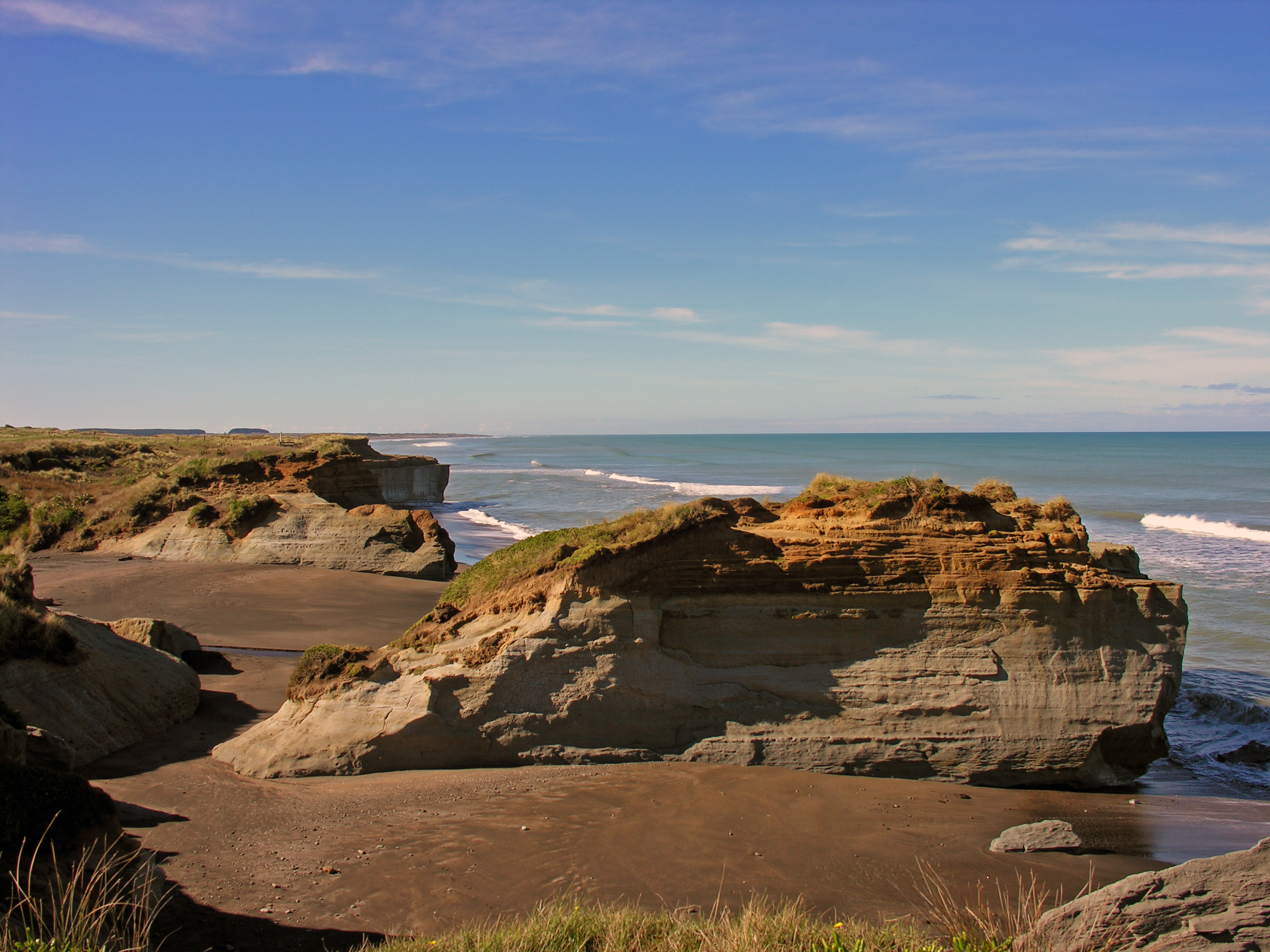
Waverley Beach

Waverley has a black sand beach, the colour is due to iron sand deposits. The campground at the beach is well used in the summer months, as the beach provides safe surfing. Waverley has a number of cafes and coffee shops and is a popular place for tourists to stop for a break before entering the Taranaki region.

Waverley and surrounding community has a South Taranaki District Council LibraryPlus, which provides a full library service and Council related services. These services include being able to register your dog, pay your rates or inquire about obtaining a building permit. Other services include a Tot Time for the under 5s and bookclub catering to intermediate and high school age children. The LibraryPlus also has three APN computers, offering free internet and Skype to the public.

Waverley railway station, built in 1880–81 as part of the line's extension north from Waitotara, is one of the oldest surviving examples in New Zealand of the Public Works Department's standard "Class 4" design, is registered by Heritage New Zealand (List No. 5109) and classified Category A by the Rail Heritage Trust of New Zealand.

Waverley has a small skatepark as well as a playground in the town park that can be seen off the main road that runs through Waverley. Also there are well kept tennis courts and on Brassey St there is a small dirt jump track for push bikes. The locals call it the BMX track. The cave at Waverley's cave beach has collapsed due to erosion. There is a Craft and Farmers Market every 3rd Sunday at the Community hall in Chester St from 9am to 1pm

== Education ==
Waverley Primary School is a co-educational contributing primary (years 1–8) school with a roll of 157 students as of July 2026. Public education started in the area in 1873. Waverley High School closed on 20 April 2007, after its NCEA assessments were found to be unreliable.

== Notable people ==
Notable people who were born or lived in Waverley include:

- Simon Dickie, a New Zealand rowing cox who won three Olympic medals
- Ernest Fookes, England national rugby union team representative (1896-1899)
- Steph Lewis, Member of Parliament for Whanganui (2020 to 2023)
- Snow Lupton, trainer of Kiwi, winner of the 1983 Melbourne Cup
- Bill Rowling, the 30th Prime Minister of New Zealand (1974 to 1975)
- Judith Stanway, a New Zealand economist and chairwoman of the Lakes District Health Board
- Paul Williams, international rugby referee
