= Waitōtara River =

River in New Zealand

Coordinates: 39°51′06″S 174°41′13″E

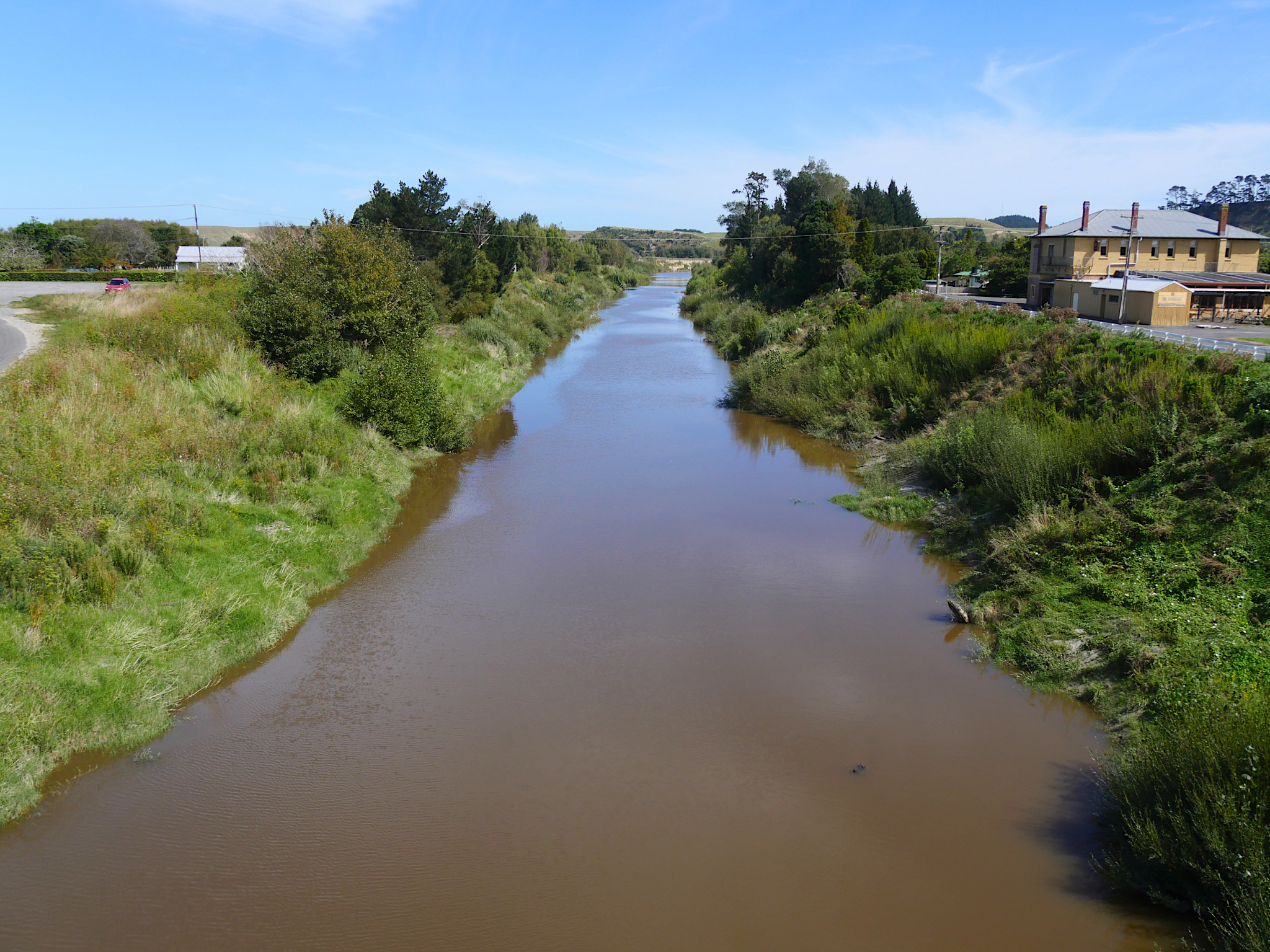
View of the river facing south-west

The Waitōtara River in New Zealand's North Island stretches approximately 100 kilometres (62 mi) in length from its headwaters in the Matemateāonga Range to its mouth on the South Taranaki Bight. The river takes in significant tributaries such as the Ngutuwera, Makakaho, Pokeka, Omaru and Totara Streams.

== Settlements and access ==
The river catchment and its tributaries are accessed via the Waitotara Valley Road and Ngutuwera Road, and associated side-roads. The village of Waitōtara is the predominant settlement of the catchment, located at the junction of the Waitotara Valley Road and State Highway 3. The viability of the Waitōtara settlement has recently been challenged by a number of devastating flood events, while the Waitotara School has undergone complete refurbishment.

Along the Waitōtara River lie the localities of Rangitatau, Puau, Orangimea, Tawhiwhi, Makakaho Junction, Ngamatapouri and Taumatatahi. Ngutuwera catchment localities include Ngutuwera, Mangawhio, Waikare and the Omata Valley. Located in the upper reaches of the Makakaho Stream is the locality of Makakaho. The upper valley localities are particularly isolated, Ngamatapouri Primary School being 47 kilometres (29 mi) from Waitōtara village.

== Traditional Māori land use ==
The Waitōtara River is the home to Ngā Rauru Kītahi, a local Māori iwi. Hapū include Ngā Ariki (Waipapa Marae), Ngāti Pourua (Takirau Marae), Ngāti Hinewaiata te hapū o Te Ihupuku Marae, Ngāti Hou Tipua (Whare Tapapa, Kaipo Marae). The Ngā Rauru Kītahi headquarters are in Waverley.

The river was traditionally utilised as a means of transport. Food traditionally gathered from the Waitōtara River include kakahi (fresh water mussels), tuna (eels), whitebait, smelt, flounder, and sole.

== Contemporary land use ==
The lower catchment (together with the Ngutuwera, Makakahoe and Pokeke catchments) is largely reliant upon sheep and beef pastoral farming. The upper catchment (including the Omaru and Totara tributaries) remains as pristine forest, and is managed by DOC as the Waitōtara Conservation Area. “Remote Adventures” operates a tourism service in Taumatatahi, 57 kilometres (35 mi) from Waitōtara village.
