= Waitōtara =

Settlement in Taranaki Region, New Zealand

- Interactive map of Waitōtara
- Coordinates: 39°48′21″S 174°44′4″E
- Country: New Zealand
- Region: Taranaki
- Territorial authority: South Taranaki District
- Ward: Pātea General Ward; Te Tai Tonga Māori Ward
- Community: Pātea Community
- Electorates: Whanganui; Te Tai Hauāuru (Māori)

Government
  - Territorial Authority: South Taranaki District Council
  - Regional council: Taranaki Regional Council
  - Mayor of South Taranaki: Phil Nixon
  - Whanganui MP: Carl Bates
  - Te Tai Hauāuru MP: Debbie Ngarewa-Packer

Area
  - Total: 0.25 km^{2} (0.097 sq mi)

Population (June 2025)
  - Total: 70
  - Density: 280/km^{2} (730/sq mi)

Waitōtara is a town in South Taranaki, New Zealand. Waverley is 10 km to the north-west, and Whanganui is 34 km to the south-east. State Highway 3 passes through it. The Waitōtara River flows past the east side of the town.

More than 30 homes were evacuated during flooding in February 2004.

A local freezing works is a major employer.

In April 2025 the 104-year old Waitotara Hotel, which was also used as a grocery story and postal centre, was devastated by a fire.

Waitōtara railway station opened on 20 September 1880 but closed on 15 September 1986. The building is now preserved near Waitara.

== Demographics ==
Waitōtara is described by Statistics New Zealand as a rural settlement. It covers 0.25 km^{2} (0.097 sq mi) and had an estimated population of 70 as of June 2025, with a population density of 280 people per km^{2}. It is part of the larger Manutahi-Waitotora statistical area.

Historical population
| Year | Pop. | ±% p.a. |
|---|---|---|
| 2006 | 66 | — |
| 2013 | 66 | +0.00% |
| 2018 | 72 | +1.76% |
| 2023 | 69 | −0.85% |

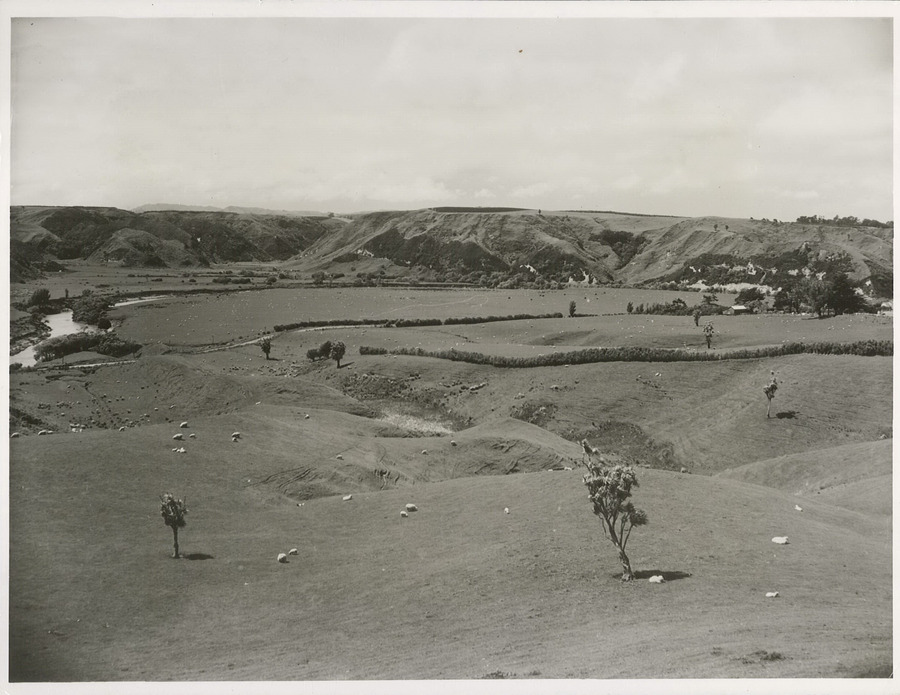
Site of the Waitōtara Redoubt, built during the Second Taranaki War (shown in 1948).

Waitōtara had a population of 69 in the 2023 New Zealand census, a decrease of 3 people (−4.2%) since the 2018 census, and an increase of 3 people (4.5%) since the 2013 census. There were 39 males and 30 females in 36 dwellings. The median age was 54.3 years (compared with 38.1 years nationally). There were 9 people (13.0%) aged under 15 years, 12 (17.4%) aged 15 to 29, 27 (39.1%) aged 30 to 64, and 21 (30.4%) aged 65 or older.

People could identify as more than one ethnicity. The results were 73.9% European (Pākehā), 34.8% Māori, and 4.3% Asian. English was spoken by 100.0%, and Māori by 4.3%. No language could be spoken by 4.3% (e.g. too young to talk). The percentage of people born overseas was 4.3, compared with 28.8% nationally.

Religious affiliations were 21.7% Christian, and 4.3% Hindu. People who answered that they had no religion were 56.5%, and 17.4% of people did not answer the census question.

Of those at least 15 years old, 3 (5.0%) people had a bachelor's or higher degree, 27 (45.0%) had a post-high school certificate or diploma, and 30 (50.0%) people exclusively held high school qualifications. The median income was $26,500, compared with $41,500 nationally. 3 people (5.0%) earned over $100,000 compared to 12.1% nationally. The employment status of those at least 15 was 21 (35.0%) full-time, 6 (10.0%) part-time, and 6 (10.0%) unemployed.

== Marae ==
Waitōtara has marae associated with the hapū of Ngā Rauru Kītahi:

- Te Ihupuku Marae and Te Kawerau and Karepoonia are affiliated with Ngāti Hinewaiata.
- Kaipō or Wharetapapa Marae and its Tokanuhea III meeting house are affiliated with Ngāti Hou Tipua.
- Takirau Marae and Ko Te Marunga Nui o Pourua meeting house are affiliated with Ngāti Pourua.
- Tauranga Ika Marae and Te Aputa ki Wairau meeting house are affiliated with Ngāti Ruaiti.
- Waipapa Marae and Ngā Paiaka meeting house are affiliated with Ngā Ariki.

In October 2020, the Government committed $522,926 from the Provincial Growth Fund to upgrade Te Ihupuku Marae, Waipapa Marae and Te Aroha Marae, creating 92 jobs.

== Education ==
Waitotara School is a coeducational full primary (years 1–8) school with a roll of 41 students as of July 2026. The school was founded in 1874.

== See also ==
- Pehimana
- Waitotara (New Zealand electorate)
