= Waitara railway station, New Zealand =

Railway station in New Zealand

Waitara
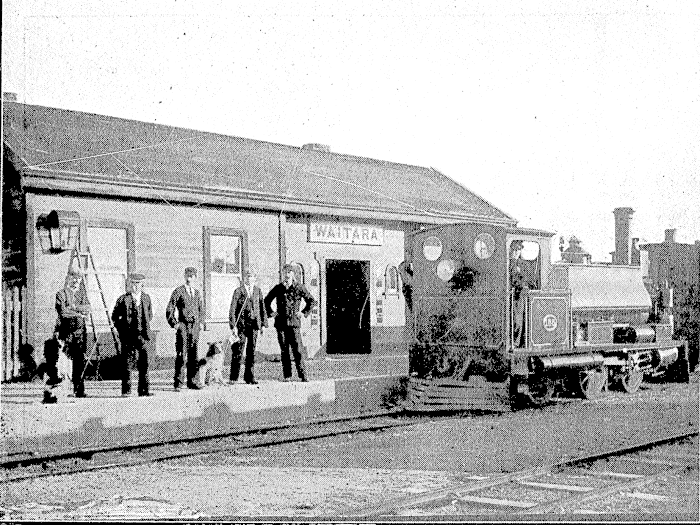
- Waitara Railway Station in 1904, with an F-class locomotive in the yard.

General information
- Location: Ogle Street; Waitara 4320; New Zealand
- Coordinates: 39°00′2.8512″S 174°14′5.1072″E
- Elevation: 15 m (49 ft)
- System: New Zealand Government Railways (NZGR); Regional rail
- Line: Waitara Branch
- Distance: 6.77 km (4.21 mi) from Lepperton
- Platforms: Single side

Construction
- Structure type: at-grade
- Parking: No
- Architectural style: Vogel class 5 (original building); Vogel class 3 (rebuild)

History
- Opened: 15 October 1875 (passengers); 25 October 1875 (freight)
- Closed: 29 April 1946 (passengers); 22 February 1999 (freight)
- Rebuilt: 1893 after fire
Location
Notes
- Previous station: Waitara Road Station; Next station: None

Waitara railway station is an urban railway station on the Waitara Branch railway serving the regional town of Waitara in New Zealand's Taranaki district. It previously served the local freezing works and local port.

It is now run by the Waitara Railway Preservation Society who run heritage services on the line.

== History ==
The original railway station was officially opened on 14 October 1875, the day the New Plymouth – Waitara railway opened to traffic (though the builders John Brogden and Sons had operated limited services since 26 June that year). The station was located at the edge of the small settlement, then named Raleigh, on the banks of the Waitara River.

Facilities included a Vogel-era Class 5 station building with wooden platform (on the northern side of the yard), a goods shed, 3 loops on the southern side of the yard, an engine shed and sidings to West Quay and the port. Shortly afterwards a 5th-class stationmaster's house was also built.

On 15 June 1893 a fire broke out in the station building's lamp room. The station was destroyed, with the only items surviving being documents in the safe, and a round table salvaged before the fire consumed it. The passenger carriages were pushed to safety as well. Consideration was given to relocating the Class-5 station building from Ngaere as a replacement before eventually deciding to build a brand new building.

The replacement building was recorded as being a Vogel-era Class 4 station, though photographs show a Class 3 station was built. By now the following facilities were in place: station building with a concrete passenger platform, cart approach & urinals, a 60 ft x 40 ft goods shed, an engine shed, water services, a weighbridge for goods received by boat & a stationmaster's house. Trackage included 3 loops with capacity for 27 wagons (x1) and 16 wagons (x2), and back shunts of 7 wagons, 5 wagons and 4 wagons length. The opportunity was taken to move the station to the town side of the yards, and cattle and sheep yards were added 2 years later.

=== Municipal tensions ===
There was considerable agitation around the location of the railway station almost from the time it opened, as the station effectively split the township in two, with only one level crossing at Queen Street.

In January 1878, an estimate was prepared for the moving Waitara station to leave Queen Street unobscured. In 1884 and again in 1885, the Raleigh Town Board applied for a crossing to be provided at Cracroft Street (which was eventually built), and in 1886 and 1887 the Town Board asked for the station to be moved to allow for a level crossing at Domett Street.

In 1893 after the original station building burnt down, the town board and petitioners successfully lobbied to have the replacement building built on the town side of the yards where it remained for nearly 100 years.

=== New century ===
By the early 20th century the station had become a busy location. For example, in March 1909 the station recorded the following traffic: 2,986 Passengers, 14 season tickets, 189 parcels, 29 dogs, 8 horses, 168 cattle, 15,851 sheep, 24 pigs, 126 ton of chaff, 200 bales of wool, 157,600 feet of timber, 40 ton grain, 290 ton merchandise, 77 ton of coal & 111 ton of other minerals. Total revenue for the month was £1,105 9s 6d. Space at the goods shed was so tight a considerable number of trucks filled with goods were unable to be unloaded owing to want of space in the shed.

Complaints were also mounting around the lack of weather protection for passengers and goods at the station building. In 1905 the mayor requested to premier Richard Seddon during a town visit, for both a verandah at the station and improved carriages for passenger services. It would be 1911 that the station finally received its verandah, and was repainted at the same time along with general improvements to the goods shed.

In 1941 the engine shed was moved to a more convenient site closer to the station building, and a new siding for washing stock wagons was provided. The siding ran behind the goods shed and allowed for stock wagons to be washed out over a specially designed pit by means of pressure hoses. This was screened off from public view by a high wall with hinged doors provided for the purpose of shovelling the manure when it was being carted away.

== Other facilities ==
=== Waitara Port sidings ===
The port at Waitara was located on West Quay, just down from the road bridge over the river. The port was already established when the Waitara Branch was opened and was a major reason this line was built before the route south. Between 1875 and 1885 (when the Breakwater line was opened connecting to the deep water port in New Plymouth) Waitara Port was the only rail-served port in the district. Several warehouses and stores were built at the port along West Quay, served by both ship and rail.

The port slowly declined in importance, with the river bar being a major issue. The port was finally decommissioned in 1941. The railway sidings were noted by this point as not having been used for several years. However a backshunt was retained through the former port as it also served the nearby meat works and cool stores. This was finally removed in November 2002 in preparation for the upgrade of West Quay as a recreational space.

=== Post Office ===
On 1 December 1876, a post office for the town was opened in the station building. This was initially operated by Railways staff; in 1885 it was reported as being run by the railways ganger. On 1 April 1885 post office staff were employed to run the postal side of the business.

The post office remained when the station was rebuilt, but in December 1898 the post office moved to a new site on the corner of Queen and Whittaker Streets.

=== Meat works sidings ===
In 1885 the New Zealand Frozen Meat Company established a meet freezing works and cannery on land adjacent to the port and railway line. The site was chosen as steamers could load directly from the site without needing further transport, but there were also good rail links to the deep water port at Moturoa and the rest of the province. The works has a rocky start – in 1887 they were closed due to financial issues with the parent company and equipment removed. In 1890 they were purchased privately and reopened, and after another sale in 1898 were eventually purchased by Thomas Borthwick and Sons Ltd on 13 April 1903.

Traffic from the works was steady, with livestock arriving and chilled goods dispatched. This became more important as sea exports from the port stopped in the early 20th century. By the mid-20th century, multiple sidings served the works and cool stores. These lasted in place until the closure of the (now AFFCO) works in 1997 and the demolition of the abattoir (the cool stores continued to be used).

== Decline and closure ==
Waitara station on 30 August 1974, showing the goods yard and the neighbouring Borthwicks meat works. The former port was at the bottom of the photo.

In the post-war years, much of the general traffic started to drop away as motor vehicles became more affordable. The first to go was passenger services, which were replaced with Road Services buses. At first these ran between Waitara and Lepperton stations to connect with passenger and mixed services on the Marton-New Plymouth railway, but eventually ran direct to New Plymouth.

While general traffic was falling, stock and frozen meat traffic from the freezing works remained steady. However, stock traffic moved to trucks in the 1970s as railways moved away from the carriage of live animals. By 1979 all that remained at the station was the station building & passenger platform, jigger sheds, goods shed with crane, low-level loading bank and the sidings to the freezing works.

In April 1984 the goods shed was removed. By this time Queen Street had been diverted through the former stock yard and cleaning area to connect with Grey Street. In 1989 the station building was demolished also. By this time, frozen meat containers were the only remaining freight on the line.

The railway station's final closure came swiftly. In 1997 the AFFCO meatworks closed (having begun laying off staff in 1989). With no other traffic on offer, the line was closed by Tranz Rail on 2 February 1999 and the station (by now reduced to a main line, single loop and works sidings) with it.

== Today ==
The station still exists as the Waitara Railway Preservation Society purchased the line in 2001 and now operates heritage passenger services along the branch. Two loops have been partially reinstated for wagon storage, though no station building has been built in the town to replace the one demolished in 1989. Trains now operate from an abridged port siding that stops just before West Quay.

The land where the goods shed and stock yards once were is now fenced off and used as a bus depot and commercial business, using a building originally erected to restore railway locomotives built by the Hooterville Heritage Charitable Trust. Grey Street has been extended over the railway yards as well.

Some railway tracks remain in the former works site, where ANZCO Foods Ltd set up a plant to manufacture beef patties, hamburgers, salamis, beef jerky and sausages. This remaining trackage is not connected to the station yards.
