= Waitara Railway Preservation Society =

Railway society established in 1999

Coordinates: 39°01′08″S 174°13′20″E

- Locale: Waitara, Taranaki New Zealand
- Terminus: Waitara

Commercial operations
- Name: Waitara Branch
- Built by: New Zealand Government Railways
- Original gauge: 1,067 mm (3 ft 6 in)

Preserved operations
- Owned by: Waitara Railway Preservation Society
- Operated by: Waitara Railway Preservation Society
- Stations: Two
- Length: 7.45 km (4.63 mi)
- Preserved gauge: 1,067 mm (3 ft 6 in)

Commercial history
- Opened: 1875
- Closed to passengers: 1948
- Closed: 1999

Preservation history
- 1999: Purchased from Tranz Rail
- 2003: Reopened for passengers
- 2004: Tahora Station moved to Brixton
- 2015: Waiongana River bridge reopened
- 2020: Line extended to Lepperton Yards

Website
- www.waitararailway.org.nz

The Waitara Railway Preservation Society is a society established in 1999 to operate a heritage railway over the former Waitara Industrial Line railway that operated between Lepperton and Waitara in the New Plymouth District of New Zealand's North Island. The line had been closed that year after 124 years of operation, after the closure of the local AFFCO freezing works in the town.

== The preserved line ==
The preserved line begins at the northern end of the Lepperton Railway Yards (just past the main line turnout) and continues parallel to the Marton - New Plymouth Railway for a few hundred meters before turning right at Sentry Hill towards the Waiongana Stream. After crossing the stream the line runs to the former Waitara Road station and former Waitara Taranaki Co-Operative Dairy Company buildings at Brixton. The line continues from here towards Waitara, passing underneath State Highway 3 at Big Jim's Overpass. Finally, the line drops into the Waitara Valley and into the township of Waitara proper, finishing just before the Waitara River.

In Waitara, most of the infrastructure is gone with only the main line and one loop remaining in the yard. The former Tahora station has been relocated to Waitara Road, where the society's rolling stock is stored. The site of the Lepperton railway station & yard is still owned and operated by KiwiRail, where the station building was removed in 1994.

The branch line has 8 level crossings along its length, all of which are protected by compulsory stop signs. Issues with these were raised in the community in 2004 as legally traffic has to stop even though trains seldom ran more than once a month. The Land Transport Safety Authority (now NZTA) would not allow Give Way signs and reinstating bells and lights had been reported as costing over $250,000 per crossing (almost the purchase price of the entire line in 1999) making installation unlikely for foreseeable future. Rail operations have become more frequent since then but motorists failing to stop for the societies trains is still an issue.

== Operation ==
Trains are run twice daily on the first and third Sundays of the month, departing from Waitara. The trip takes 70-80 minutes return. The railway also offers charter services by arrangement.

Since around 2007, trains had only journeyed as far as the Waiongana River bridge due to the deterioration of the sleepers on the structure. In April 2014 the bridge was re-sleepered and maintenance completed on the main bridge structure (including removing the former Waitara town water pipes from the side). This has allowed trains to return to the entire branch line (and a proposed loop at the former Sentry Hill station site).

In 2019 the society entered into a lease to the Lepperton railway sidings (but not the main line and loop) which will allow locomotives to switch ends of the train. As part of this agreement, the society has built a new linking track to bypass the Kiwirails network which is under Centralised Traffic Control.

Former logo of the Waitara Railway Preservation Society.

== Rolling stock ==
=== Locomotives ===
The Waitara Railway Preservation Society owns a number of diesel shunting locomotives, either operational or awaiting restoration. These include:

Class & Number	TMS Number	Type	Year	Built by	Makers Number	Status	Notes
-	-	0-4-0D diesel shunter	1954	Drewry	2507	Unknown	Built for Northland Fertiliser Co, Whangarei. Donated in 1999.
PC 11	-	0-6-0D diesel shunter	1958	Bagnall	3144	In service	Built for Portland Cement. Donated to the Taranaki Flyer Society Incorporated in 2010 but returned in 2013 when that group folded.
D^{sa} 240	DSA414	0-6-0D diesel shunter	1956	Bagnall	3079	Stored	Arrived 2008 from Ravensdown Fertilizer, New Plymouth.
D^{sc} 423	DSC2257	Bo-Bo diesel shunter	1963	NZR Addington Workshops	403 of 1963	Stored	Formerly use at Ravensdown Fertilizer, New Plymouth.
D^{sc} 453	DSC2584	Bo-Bo diesel shunter	1966	NZR Addington Workshops	433 of 1966	Stored	Purchased in 2003.
-	TR1026 / Price222	0-6-0D diesel shunter	1968	A & G Price Ltd	222 of 1968	In Service	Built for Pacific Steel in Otahuhu. Purchased by Tranz Rail in 1997 and classified as Price 222, before being reclassified TR 1026. Privately owned.
T^{r} 108	TR407	0-4-0D diesel shunter	1957	A & G Price Ltd	177 of 1957	In service	

==== Former resident locomotives ====
Locomotives formerly based at Waitara include:

- F^{A} 250 0-6-2T steam locomotive, built in 1892. Leased from the Waikato branch of the NZR&LS
- T^{r} 164 0-4-0D diesel shunter, built in 1959. Now at F&DSRS in Feilding. Privately owned.

The WRPS's collection of rolling stock consists of both passenger carriages and freight wagons, and is either owned outright by the society or is leased from the Rail Heritage Trust of New Zealand. This includes:

=== Passenger Vehicles ===
Class & Number	TMS Number	Type	Year	Built by	Status	Notes
A 1952	A56536	56ft Passenger Car	1939	NZR Addington Workshops	In Use	
A^{L} 1837	AL50182	50ft Car Van	1936	NZR Otahuhu Workshops	Under Restoration	
A^{d} 709	AD1403	60-foot Carriage			Stored	Privately Owned. Former Postal Van F^{p} 709 / Business Car
A^{d} ???	AD1432	60-foot Carriage			Stored	Privately Owned. Former Postal Van F^{p} 711/ Business Car

=== Guards Vans ===
Class & Number	TMS Number	Type	Year	Built by	Notes
F 582	F1180	50' Guards Van	1931	NZR Addington Workshops	
F 726	F1892	37'6" Guards Van	1964	NZR Otahuhu Workshops	Modified for passenger use.
F 745	F2094	37'6" Guards Van	1967	NZR Otahuhu Workshops	

=== Goods Wagons ===
Class & Number	TMS Number	Type	Sub-type	Year	Built by	Notes
N^{A} 1566	NA749	Flat Deck		1977	NZR Addington Workshops	Rebuilt as NAK 6118 in 1987. Mobile ticket office built on deck of wagon.
N^{A} 1671	NA2396	Flat Deck		1977	NZR Addington Workshops	Rebuilt as NAK 6486 in 1987.
N^{A} 1907	NA4993	Flat Deck		1977	NZR Addington Workshops	Rebuilt as NAK 6078 in 1986. Used as open carriage for passengers.
N^{A} 1777	NA3562	Flat Deck		1977	NZR Addington Workshops	Rebuilt as NAK 6541 in 1987.
N^{A} 1872	NA4618	Flat Deck		1977	NZR Addington Workshops	Rebuilt as NAK 6056 in 1987. Passenger body built on deck.
N^{AK}	NAK6595	Flat Deck				
L^{A} 17200	LA3264	High-side	L^{A}-6	1931	NZR Otahuhu Workshops	
U^{B} 955	UB833	Flat Deck	U^{B}-5	1938	NZR Otahuhu Workshops	Used as open passenger vehicle EA3298.
U^{C} 810	UC248	Tank wagon	UC-3	1938	NZR Petone Workshops	
U^{G} 79	EA1012	Horse Box	U^{G}-4	1931	NZR Otahuhu Workshops	Frame only. Used as passenger vehicle.
U^{S} 3082	US55	Flat Deck	US-1	1968	NZR Hillside Workshops	
Y^{B} 65	-	Ballast Wagon	Y^{B}-2	1890		
Y^{B} 600	YB1466	Ballast Wagon	YB-4	1941	NZR Otahuhu Workshops	
Y^{C} 710	YC124	Ballast Wagon	Y^{C}-1	1959	NZR East Town Workshops	
-	YH477	Ballast Wagon	Y^{H}-1	1979	NZR East Town Workshops	
Z 282	Z201	Box Wagon	Z-14	1941	NZR Otahuhu Workshops	
Z^{P} 656	ZP10063	Box Wagon		1968	Mitsubishi Heavy Industries	
-	ZP14531	Box Wagon			Mitsubishi Heavy Industries	

== Buildings & Facilitates ==
=== Station Buildings ===
None of the original station buildings remained when the line was purchased. Since the railway was purchased, new stations have been created. This has included relocating two historic station buildings, both former New Zealand Railways stations.

- Waitara Road's station complex includes the former Tahora & Waitōtara station buildings. The Tahora building is fully restored while the Waitōtara building is under restoration.
- The shelter at Magnolia Glade is a former New Plymouth City Transport bus shelter.

=== Magnolia Glade ===
Magnolia Glade is located just past Waitara Road station and is the site of over 200 new trees planted along the line, including a significant number of Magnolias. Trains are operated as part of the Taranaki Fringe Garden Festival each year while the trees are in bloom.
