= Tikorangi =

Settlement in Taranaki, New Zealand

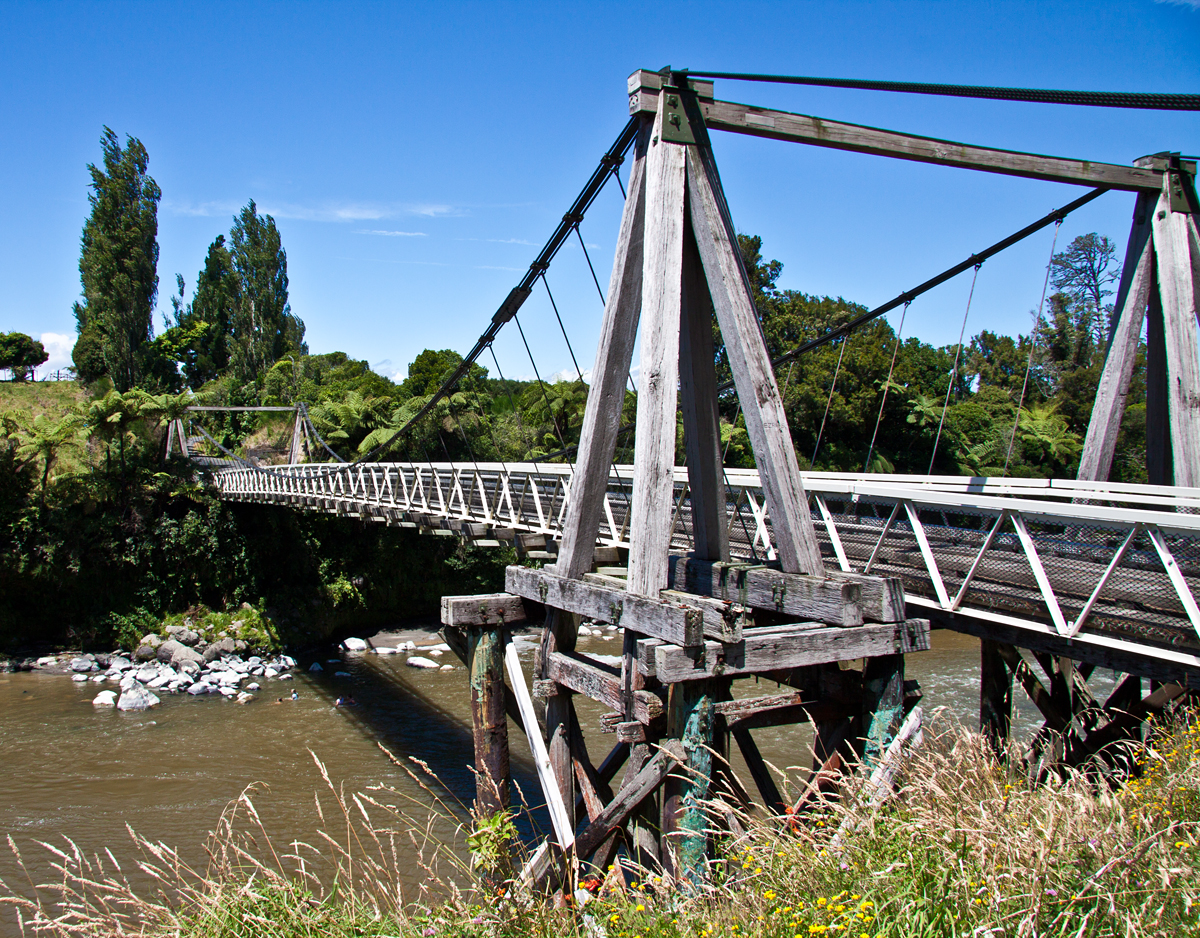
- The Bertrand road suspension bridge
- Interactive map of Tikorangi
- Coordinates: 39°2′2″S 174°16′47″E
- Country: New Zealand
- Region: Taranaki Region
- Territorial authority: New Plymouth District
- Ward: North General Ward; Te Purutanga Mauri Pūmanawa Māori Ward
- Community: Clifton Community
- Electorates: Taranaki-King Country; Te Tai Hauāuru (Māori)

Government
  - Territorial Authority: New Plymouth District Council
  - Regional council: Taranaki Regional Council
  - Mayor of New Plymouth: Max Brough
  - Taranaki-King Country MP: Barbara Kuriger
  - Te Tai Hauāuru MP: Debbie Ngarewa-Packer

Area
  - Total: 67.74 km^{2} (26.15 sq mi)

Population (2023 Census)
  - Total: 612
  - Density: 9.03/km^{2} (23.4/sq mi)

Tikorangi is a settlement in Taranaki, New Zealand. Waitara lies about 6 kilometres to the north-west. The Waitara River flows to the west of the settlement, with the Bertrand Road suspension bridge providing access to the other side. The Mangaemiemi or Otaraua Marae and Te Ahi Kaa Roa meeting house are a local meeting place for Otaraua, a hapū of Te Āti Awa.

Tikorangi was the site of the Tikorangi Redoubt, a British military post set up in June 1865 during the Second Taranaki War.

Tikorangi's Jury Garden has been awarded the highest rating by the New Zealand Gardens Trust: Garden of National Significance. It is open to the public for part of the year.

The Bertrand Road suspension bridge connects Tikorangi to Huirangi.

== Demographics ==
Tikorangi locality covers 67.74 km^{2} (26.15 sq mi). The locality is part of the Tikorangi statistical area.

Historical population for Tikorangi locality
Year	Pop.	±% p.a.
2013	561	—
2018	564	+0.11%
2023	612	+1.65%

The locality had a population of 612 in the 2023 New Zealand census, an increase of 48 people (8.5%) since the 2018 census, and an increase of 51 people (9.1%) since the 2013 census. There were 312 males and 297 females in 219 dwellings. 2.0% of people identified as LGBTIQ+. There were 120 people (19.6%) aged under 15 years, 126 (20.6%) aged 15 to 29, 282 (46.1%) aged 30 to 64, and 81 (13.2%) aged 65 or older.

People could identify as more than one ethnicity. The results were 86.3% European (Pākehā), 26.0% Māori, 2.0% Pasifika, 1.0% Asian, and 4.4% other, which includes people giving their ethnicity as "New Zealander". English was spoken by 98.0%, Māori by 4.4%, Samoan by 1.0%, and other languages by 2.5%. No language could be spoken by 2.0% (e.g. too young to talk). The percentage of people born overseas was 8.8, compared with 28.8% nationally.

Religious affiliations were 23.5% Christian, 0.5% Māori religious beliefs, 2.5% New Age, and 1.0% other religions. People who answered that they had no religion were 63.7%, and 8.3% of people did not answer the census question.

Of those at least 15 years old, 72 (14.6%) people had a bachelor's or higher degree, 318 (64.6%) had a post-high school certificate or diploma, and 99 (20.1%) people exclusively held high school qualifications. 51 people (10.4%) earned over $100,000 compared to 12.1% nationally. The employment status of those at least 15 was 303 (61.6%) full-time, 78 (15.9%) part-time, and 3 (0.6%) unemployed.

=== Tikorangi statistical area ===
Tikorangi statistical area includes Motunui, Onaero and Urenui and covers 167.27 km^{2} (64.58 sq mi) and had an estimated population of 2,130 as of June 2025, with a population density of 13 people per km^{2}.

Historical population for Tikorangi statistical area
Year	Pop.	±% p.a.
2006	1,590	—
2013	1,755	+1.42%
2018	1,815	+0.67%
2023	2,055	+2.51%
The 2006 population is for a larger area of 167.69 km^{2}. Source:

The statistical area had a population of 2,055 in the 2023 New Zealand census, an increase of 240 people (13.2%) since the 2018 census, and an increase of 300 people (17.1%) since the 2013 census. There were 1,041 males, 1,005 females, and 6 people of other genders in 801 dwellings. 1.9% of people identified as LGBTIQ+. The median age was 42.9 years (compared with 38.1 years nationally). There were 369 people (18.0%) aged under 15 years, 318 (15.5%) aged 15 to 29, 957 (46.6%) aged 30 to 64, and 411 (20.0%) aged 65 or older.

People could identify as more than one ethnicity. The results were 89.8% European (Pākehā); 21.8% Māori; 1.8% Pasifika; 1.5% Asian; 0.1% Middle Eastern, Latin American and African New Zealanders (MELAA); and 2.6% other, which includes people giving their ethnicity as "New Zealander". English was spoken by 97.8%, Māori by 3.9%, Samoan by 0.6%, and other languages by 3.1%. No language could be spoken by 2.0% (e.g. too young to talk). New Zealand Sign Language was known by 0.3%. The percentage of people born overseas was 8.9, compared with 28.8% nationally.

Religious affiliations were 29.3% Christian, 0.3% Islam, 0.3% Māori religious beliefs, 0.1% Buddhist, 0.9% New Age, and 0.6% other religions. People who answered that they had no religion were 59.3%, and 9.6% of people did not answer the census question.

Of those at least 15 years old, 249 (14.8%) people had a bachelor's or higher degree, 1,071 (63.5%) had a post-high school certificate or diploma, and 369 (21.9%) people exclusively held high school qualifications. The median income was $39,500, compared with $41,500 nationally. 198 people (11.7%) earned over $100,000 compared to 12.1% nationally. The employment status of those at least 15 was 885 (52.5%) full-time, 276 (16.4%) part-time, and 24 (1.4%) unemployed.

== Education ==
Tikorangi School is a coeducational contributing primary (years 1–6) school with a roll of 164 students as of July 2026. The school opened in 1867.
