= Waitara Road railway station =

Railway station in New Zealand

Waitara Road
- Aerial photograph of Waitara Road Railway Station taken 14 August 1950.

General information
- Other names: Waitara West Crossing
- Location: 52 Waitara Road; Brixton 4382; New Zealand
- Coordinates: 39°01′14.6926″S 174°13′16.18003″E
- Elevation: 46 m (151 ft)
- System: New Zealand Government Railways (NZGR); Regional rail
- Line: Waitara Branch
- Distance: 4.0 km (2.5 mi) from Lepperton
- Platforms: Single side

Construction
- Structure type: at-grade
- Parking: No
- Architectural style: Vogel class 6

History
- Opened: 1882 (passengers); 1883 (freight)
- Closed: 29 April 1946 (passengers); 22 February 1999 (freight)
Location
Notes
- Previous station: Sentry Hill Station; Next station: Waitara Station

Waitara Road railway station is a rural railway station on the modern day Waitara Branch railway serving the small locality of Brixton in New Zealand's Taranaki district. It previously served the Waitara Taranaki Co-operative Dairy Company and plant nurseries Duncan and Davies Ltd.

It is now the main working base for the Waitara Railway Preservation Society who run heritage services on the line.

== History ==
The original railway station was opened in around 1883, 8 years after the opening of the New Plymouth - Waitara railway. The station was located at the crossing of Waitara Road and was opened primarily to serve the Waitara Road Dairy Factory, the first such factory in the district.

The station first appeared in timetables in 1882 as a flag station or stopping place for trains but it wasn't until 1883 that plans for a 12 wagon loop were submitted. In both 1893 and 1894, urgent requests were received for the provision of a shelter shed. But it would be November 1896 when estimates for a passenger platform and shelter shed were received, and September 1897 when the passenger platform and shelter were finally opened.

By the turn of the century, that station was described as having an accommodation shelter shed & passenger platform (southern side), a loading bank for goods and a 16-wagon loop for delivering goods. Issues remained for customers dropping off or picking up their deliveries, caused by a small loading bank and an open drain close by making cart parking tight, and also that sacks of grain, potatoes and other heavy goods were often dumped at the station building or platform on the opposite side of the track from the cart access, meaning customers had to try and back their cart over the railway line to collect their goods. This wasn't rectified until 1926 when the coal shed from Turakina was relocated as a goods shed at Waitara Road (with the addition of a verandah) - work which was costed at approximately £102.

== Decline and closure ==
In the post-war years, general traffic at Waitara Road station declined as motor vehicles became more affordable. The first to go was passenger services, which were replaced with Road Services buses in 1946. Next to go was the goods shed, which was removed in late 1957 as general consignment freight reduced.

While general traffic was falling, industrial traffic continued to keep the station running. Increasing traffic from the dairy factory (now called the Clifton Co-Operative Dairy Company, having taken over several smaller companies in the area) led to new loading warehouses being built on the former goods yard in the 1960s and a progressive expansion in the factory size.

In the late 1970s a new siding was laid to serve the plant nursery Duncan & Davies, which had relocated directly south of the station & shipped plants both nationally and internationally.

By the 1980s traffic began to drop. The dairy factory (which in 1980 became the Brixton complex for Moa-Nui Co-operative Dairies) closed in the early 1990s after over a century at the site, and Duncan & Davies stopped sending by rail before eventually going out of business completely.

Waitara Road station on 30 August 1974, showing the Clifton Co-Operative Dairy Company factory and the new Duncan and Davies nurseries (prior to the siding being laid).

The station remained technically open until 2 February 1999 when Tranz Rail closed the entire line.

== Today ==
The station still exists as the Waitara Railway Preservation Society purchased the line in 2001 and established its main base at Waitara Road.

Since then passenger facilities have been reinstated (including 2 former NZR station buildings from Tahora and Waitōtara) and new sidings have been laid (including lifting and reusing the track from the Duncan and Davies siding). Passenger services stop at the station during running days.

The neighbouring dairy factory complex still exists but is now used as a truck depot.
