= Sentry Hill railway station =

Railway station in New Zealand

Sentry Hill
- Aerial photograph of Sentry Hill Railway Station taken 20 May 1953. The 'new' Sentry Hill station was located towards the bottom of the photograph.

General information
- Other names: Sentry Hill Junction
- Location: Te Arei Road West; Lepperton 4373; New Zealand
- Coordinates: 39°02′15.684″S 174°12′9.8568″E
- Elevation: 49 m (161 ft)
- System: New Zealand Government Railways (NZGR); Regional rail
- Line: Waitara Branch
- Distance: 1.5 km (0.93 mi) from Lepperton
- Platforms: Single side

Construction
- Structure type: at-grade
- Parking: No
- Architectural style: Vogel class 6

History
- Opened: 14 October 1875
- Closed: 29 April 1946 (passengers); 22 December 1963 (freight)
- Rebuilt: 21 November 1894 (new site); 25 May 1908 (new site closed)
Location
Notes
- Previous station: Lepperton Station; Next station (mainline): Corbett Road Station; Next station (branch): Waitara Road Station

Sentry Hill railway station was a rural railway station on the modern day Waitara Branch railway. It also served as the junction between the New Plymouth - Waitara railway and the main line south until the junction was relocated to Lepperton in 1908.

The station is no longer open but the station site still sees trains from the Waitara Railway Preservation Society passing through.

== History ==
The original railway station was opened on 14 October 1875, approximately 12.47 km (7 miles 60 chains) east of New Plymouth station on the newly opened New Plymouth - Waitara railway. The station was located on Te Arei Road, close to the intersection with Mountain Road. Facilities included a Class 6 shelter shed and passenger platform, a loading bank, 40 x 30 foot shed for goods and several sidings.

The station officially became a junction station on 30 November 1877 when the line south to Inglewood opened. At this time Waitara was the main port for Northern Taranaki, and the junction with the railway south was built facing Waitara. This meant that trains from Inglewood heading to New Plymouth (or vice versa) had to change direction at Sentry Hill.

As early as 1888 the design of the junction at Sentry Hill was causing complaints. A report from the time stated that "the junction at present is very inconvenient" and "the annoyance and delay of shunting every train in and out of New Plymouth is great". Consequently, a sharply-curved loop line was built forming a triangle. This allowed trains to head from New Plymouth south without the need to change direction - though at the cost of bypassing the Sentry Hill station yard. This meant trains stopping at Sentry Hill had to reverse back out of the station before taking the bypass loop to continue their journey.

This bypass loop was sharp (with a curve radius of only 6 chains) and cut under the existing road. A new overbridge was built to allow traffic to move freely. It was the first step in moving the junction station to a more suitable location.

=== A Replacement Station ===
The next stage in upgrading the station occurred in 1894. On the 21st of November, a new station opened situated 768 metres (38 chains) from the old station, just south of the new loop line. This station (also called Sentry Hill) contained an accommodation shelter shed, passenger platform, water & coal services, fixed signals, urinals and a loop big enough to hold 32 wagons (plus back shunt). Good traffic continued to be worked at the old station grounds, with objections being received from J Little & Coy of Sentry Hill to the removal of the goods shed to the new site. The passenger shelter was removed from the old station.

The new station site was not completely satisfactory. The new station building did not have road access built at the time of the station opening, leading to complaints about poor access. By 1897 the junction station was still not completed, and at the request of residents, trains began stopping at the old station site again. It was noted that "Waitara Branch train stops at the goods yard for goods traffic and also for coaling and watering the engine when required." In 1903 a new passenger shelter was constructed at the old Sentry Hill station site after petitions from the local community.

The other problem with the new station was that it was located on a grade, which caused issues with trains taking off from the new station site. By 1907, with the expense of interlocking the signalling looming, it was decided to move the entire new station roughly half a mile south to a more suitable location. The replacement station was named Lepperton Junction. At the same time, the Waitara Branch was extended to the new Lepperton Station, running parallel to the Marton - New Plymouth line.

On 25 May 1908, the new Lepperton Station was opened and the 'new' Sentry Hill station was closed. The 'old' Sentry Hill station was retained, served by branch line trains only. Finally, in 1914 the direct track between New Plymouth and old Sentry Hill station was finally removed.

== Other Facilities ==
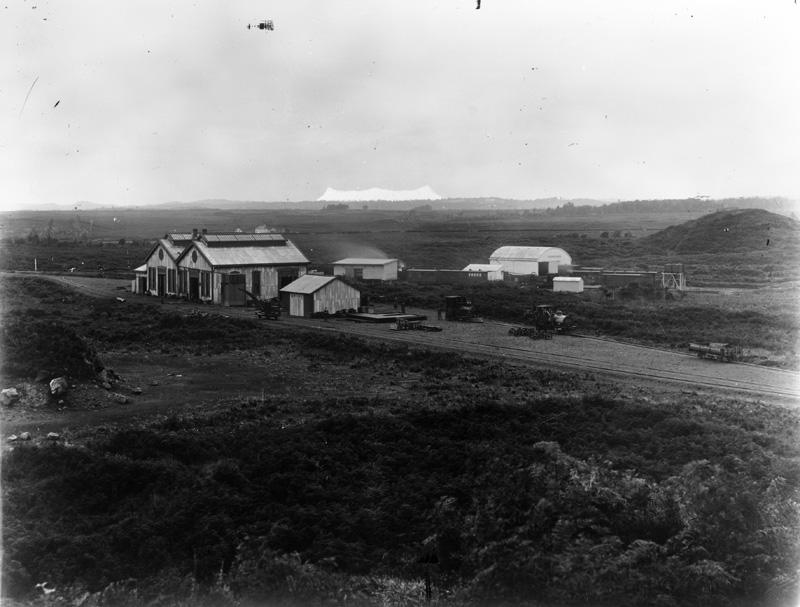
Railway workshops and goods yards at Sentry Hill Junction on the Waitara to New Plymouth branch line. Photograph taken circa 1880. Mount Ruapehu is seen covered in snow in the background.The railway junction is surrounded by bare land and trees.

=== Sentry Hill Workshops ===
On 30 September 1880 a new railway workshop was opened at Sentry Hill, responsible for all heavy maintenance on the isolated Taranaki Railways. It was located parallel to the main line on the northern side of Sentry Hill station. The workshops employed 15 men and 4-5 boys by 1885.

With the opening of the railway through to Wanganui and Palmerston North on 23 March 1885, heavy maintenance work was soon relocated to East Town Workshops in Wanganui (despite local protests at the move).

The workshops were kept open in a reduced capacity as a car and wagon repair depot. However, by 1897 it was reported that the workshop was to close, with work being transferred to the railways new Morley Road facilities on the New Plymouth port line.

=== Sentry Hill Ballast Pits ===
A small ballast pit was operated to the west of Sentry Hill station, with the first record dating from 1882 to provide road and railway metal for the district. The quality of metal from the pit was not of the best quality, but it was considered adequate in the absence of other sources at the time. The bottom of the pit was around 55 feet above the water level of the Mangaraka Stream. By contrast, the railway bridge over the same stream was 31 feet above water level.

The siding was last noted as being in place in 1911.

== Decline and closure ==
After 1908 the station settled into a familiar routine similar to most country stations in New Zealand. As traffic moved to road, the amount of traffic sent through Sentry Hill dropped and facilities began to close. The first of these was the sidings on the station's north side that had once been used for loading road metal and receiving coal (used in connection with an oil well in the area). These were removed by 12 September 1923.

In 1935, a new 40-foot platform was approved for the station to replace the old one that had rotted away, but on 29 April 1946 all passenger services were cancelled and replaced with Road Services buses, and the branch became goods only.

In 1940 it was noted that the remaining loops were sometimes used to store meat wagons for Borthwick's meat works when the Waitara yard was full.

In 1957 the loading bank and goods shed were removed, followed by a trolley shed and tool hut in 1960 (both burnt down) and in 1962 by the shelter shed and platform. By 1963 all that remained were the two 21 wagon loops for storage, and the station was closed on 22 December 1963, with the remaining yard removed shortly after.

== Today ==
Few traces of Sentry Hill station exist today. Waitara Railway Preservation Society trains continue to pass through the station site on their journey between Waitara and Lepperton. A shed has also been erected by the society at the former station site.
