= Bertrand Road suspension bridge =

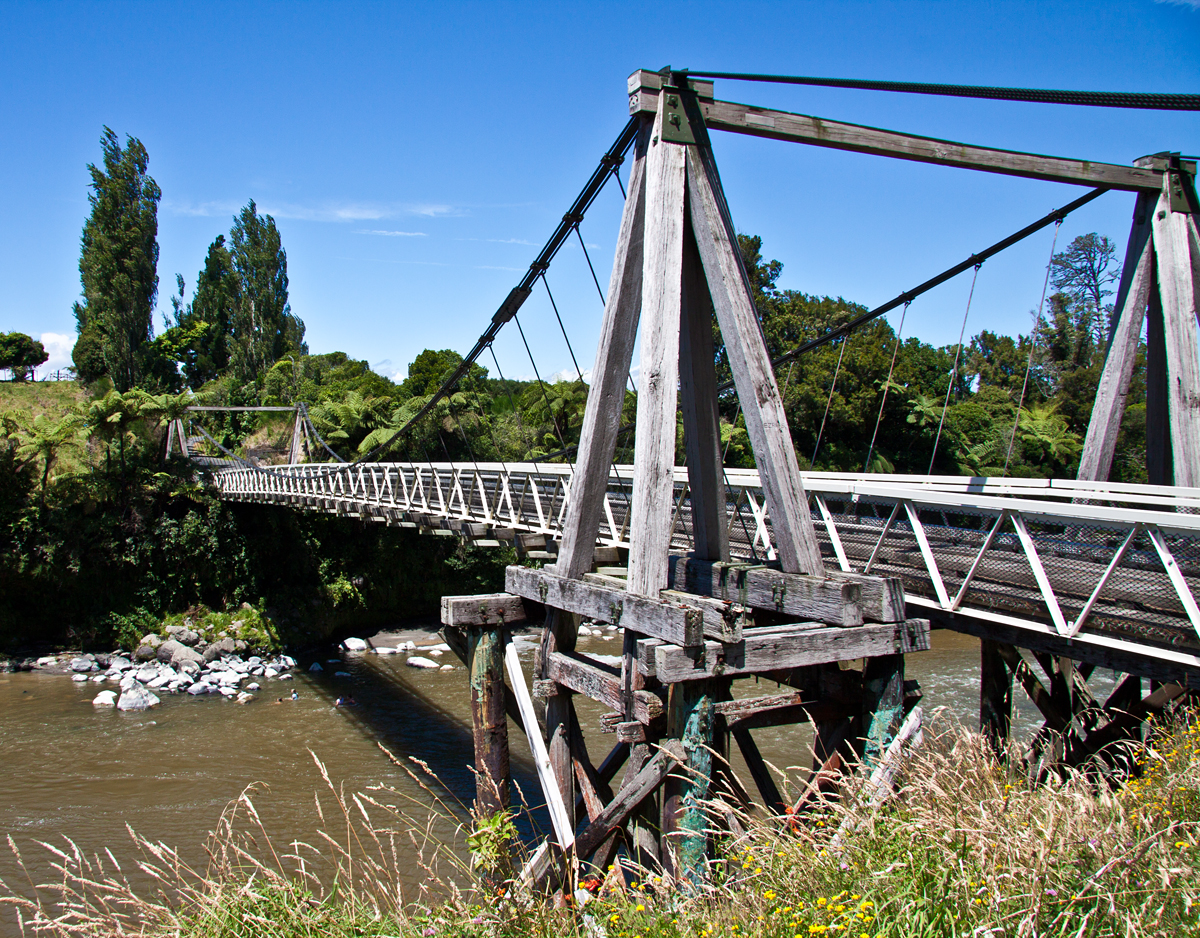
- Coordinates: 39°02′50″S 174°15′18″E
- Carries: One lane of Bertrand road 4 tonne limit
- Crosses: Waitara River
- Locale: Taranaki, New Zealand

Characteristics
- Design: Suspension Bridge
- Longest span: 61 metres (200 ft)

History
- Construction end: 1927

Statistics

Heritage New Zealand – Category 2
- Designated: 9 September 1983
- Reference no.: 936

The Bertrand Road suspension bridge is a suspension bridge in Huirangi. It is listed as a category 2 historic structure with Heritage New Zealand It crosses the Waitara River, linking Huirangi, near Lepperton and Tikorangi in north Taranaki, New Zealand. The original bridge was built in 1897, and a new bridge was built between 1926–1927 (using an adapted form of the original design).

== History ==
The original idea for the bridge was proposed by a Waitara councillor, Levi Sarten, as crossing the river to Tikorangi was proving treacherous, and road access to the area was poor. The bridge was subsequently built across the river in 1897, with a length of 210 feet, a width of 9 feet and at a cost of £695.

In the 1920s, the bridge was damaged by flooding, and was dismantled to build another crossing, using wood and steelwork from its predecessor. The second crossing opened in 1927, using a modified version of the original design, which made the bridge stronger and more wind resistant.

Over time, the bridge started to age, with height and weight restrictions imposed to extend its life. The bridge was eventually declared unsafe, and was closed to vehicular traffic in 1985. This resulted in a 16 kilometre detour. However, the bridge was still open for foot traffic and recreational use. Many attempts to reopen the bridge were unsuccessful, and the bridge became completely closed to all users in 2004.

The Bertrand Road Suspension Bridge Trust was set up to fund repairs of the bridge, with a community fundraising scheme. This included a "buy a plank" initiative, where a donation saw the donor's name engraved on the bridge. Further funding was received from the TSB Community Trust, the Taranaki Electricity Trust, and the New Zealand Lottery Environment and Heritage Committee. The Taranaki District Council also donated the $70,000 it had initially earmarked for the demolition of the bridge.

Using as much of the old bridge design as possible, and after raising $630,000, the bridge was reopened to all traffic in June 2006. The bridge now has a central span of 61 metres and a maximum weight restriction of 4 tonnes.
