= Waitara =

Waitara is the name of a number of localities:

- Waitara, New South Wales
- Waitara, New Zealand
- Waitara, Queensland
- Waitara River in Taranaki, New Zealand
