= Onaero =

Settlement in Taranaki, New Zealand

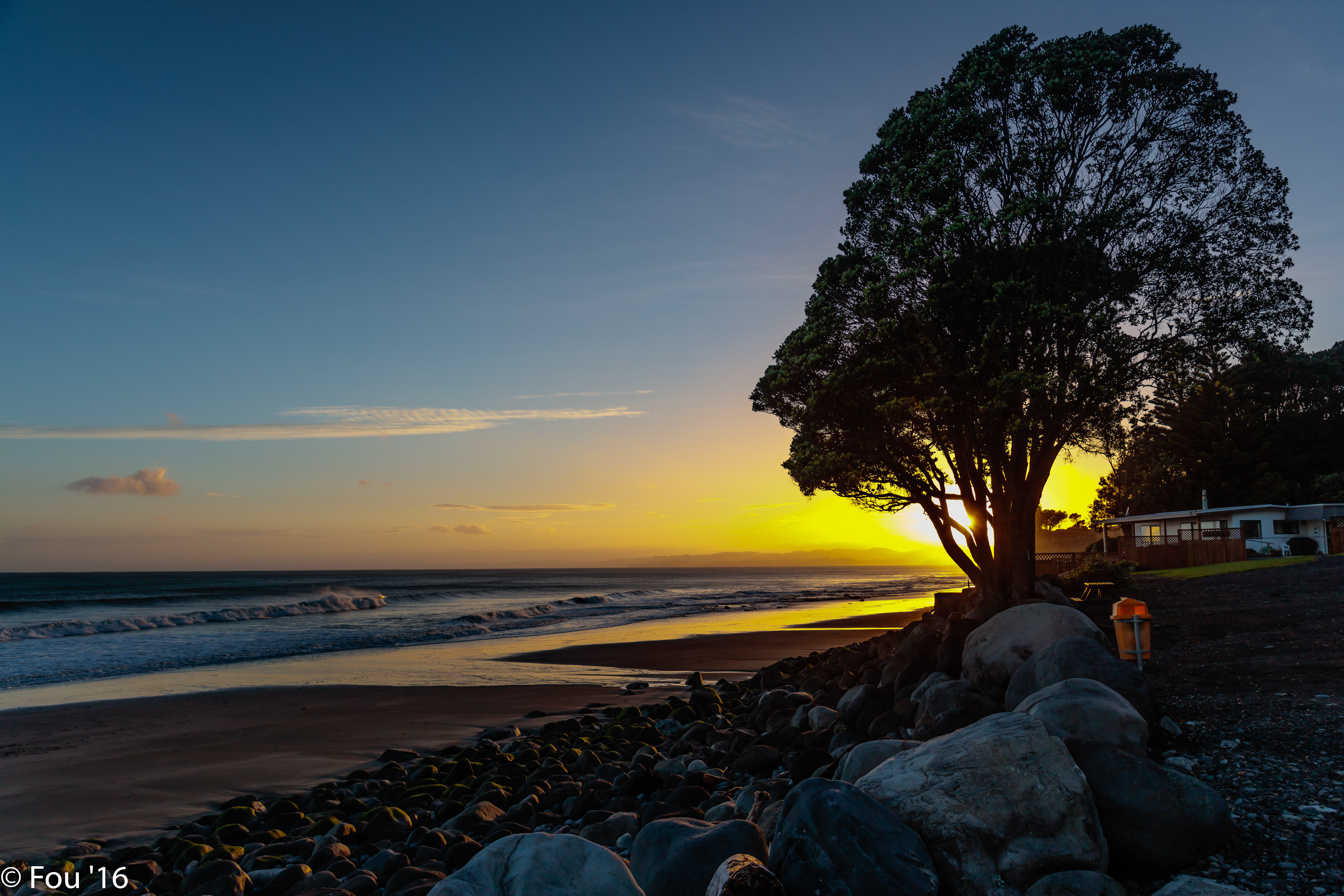
- Onaero Beach
- Interactive map of Onaero
- Coordinates: 39°00′S 174°21′E
- Country: New Zealand
- Region: Taranaki Region
- Territorial authority: New Plymouth District
- Ward: North General Ward; Te Purutanga Mauri Pūmanawa Māori Ward
- Community: Clifton Community
- Electorates: Taranaki-King Country; Te Tai Hauāuru (Māori)

Government
  - Territorial Authority: New Plymouth District Council
  - Regional council: Taranaki Regional Council
  - Mayor of New Plymouth: Max Brough
  - Taranaki-King Country MP: Barbara Kuriger
  - Te Tai Hauāuru MP: Debbie Ngarewa-Packer

Area
  - Total: 0.15 km^{2} (0.058 sq mi)

Population (June 2025)
  - Total: 70
  - Density: 470/km^{2} (1,200/sq mi)

Onaero is a settlement in northern Taranaki, on the shore of the North Taranaki Bight, in the North Island of New Zealand. Waitara is 10 kilometres (6.2 mi) to the west and Motunui a little closer, and Urenui is 4 kilometres (2.5 mi) to the east. State Highway 3 runs past Onaero.

The No. 2 Company Redoubt was a British military installation created at Onaero in 1865 during the Second Taranaki War by soldiers from the Tikorangi Redoubt. It was abandoned several months later.

== Demographics ==
Onaero Beach is described by Stats NZ as a rural settlement, which covers 0.15 km^{2} (0.058 sq mi). It had an estimated population of 70 as of June 2025, with a population density of 467 people per km^{2}. It is part of the larger Tikorangi statistical area, which covers 167.79 km^{2} (64.78 sq mi).

Historical population
Year	Pop.	±% p.a.
2006	75	—
2013	78	+0.56%
2018	75	−0.78%
2023	75	+0.00%

Ōnaero Beach had a population of 75 in the 2023 New Zealand census, unchanged since the 2018 census, and a decrease of 3 people (−3.8%) since the 2013 census. There were 33 males and 39 females in 39 dwellings. The median age was 61.2 years (compared with 38.1 years nationally). There were 3 people (4.0%) aged under 15 years, 6 (8.0%) aged 15 to 29, 42 (56.0%) aged 30 to 64, and 24 (32.0%) aged 65 or older.

People could identify as more than one ethnicity. The results were 92.0% European (Pākehā), and 8.0% Māori. English was spoken by 100.0%, and other languages by 12.0%. New Zealand Sign Language was known by 4.0%. The percentage of people born overseas was 16.0, compared with 28.8% nationally.

The only religious affiliation given was 32.0% Christian. People who answered that they had no religion were 52.0%, and 16.0% of people did not answer the census question.

Of those at least 15 years old, 15 (20.8%) people had a bachelor's or higher degree, 39 (54.2%) had a post-high school certificate or diploma, and 12 (16.7%) people exclusively held high school qualifications. The median income was $43,700, compared with $41,500 nationally. 9 people (12.5%) earned over $100,000 compared to 12.1% nationally. The employment status of those at least 15 was 27 (37.5%) full-time, 9 (12.5%) part-time, and 6 (8.3%) unemployed.
