= Waiongona railway station =

Railway station in Waiongona, New Zealand

Waiongona
- Aerial photograph of Waiongona railway station, taken on 14 August 1950.

General information
- Location: Mountain Road; Waiongona 4389; New Zealand
- Coordinates: 39°05′48.1″S 174°12′27.3″E
- Elevation: 117 metres (384 ft)
- System: New Zealand Government Railways (NZGR); Regional rail
- Line: Marton–New Plymouth line
- Platforms: Single side

Construction
- Structure type: at-grade
- Parking: No

History
- Opened: 30 November 1877
- Closed: 29 April 1956 (freight); 13 July 1958 (passengers)
- Rebuilt: 26 June 1893
Location
Notes
- Previous Station: Inglewood Station; Next Station: Lepperton Station

Waiongona railway station was a rural railway station on the Marton - New Plymouth Line serving the small locality of Waiongona in New Zealand's Taranaki district. Located on Mountain Road, the station was relocated from its original site in 1893. The station closed to all traffic in 1958, though freight trains continue to pass through the station site.

== History ==
The original Waiongona station opened in 1877 as part of the new railway line between Sentry Hill and Inglewood. It was located just north of the Waiongona Stream bridge and Mountain Road level crossing (since bypassed). The official opening date was 30 November 1877, but an advertisement from 9 August 1877 shows good trains running every Tuesday and Friday for "Waiongona Siding". Tenders for the construction of the class-six shelter shed was advertised 30 April of the following year.

In 1892 it was noted that "Waiongona station is at the foot of a 1 in 56 grade, and consists of a backshunt for six wagons. Trains stopping to shunt block the main road and a portion could be on the river bridge." These issues led to the closure of the station and its movement 1 mile 37 chain closer to New Plymouth. Despite a petition from local residents against the station being moved this was completed on 26 June 1893 and the old site cleared.

=== The Replacement Station ===
The new station was listed as having an accommodation shelter shed & passenger platform (on the roadside of the station), a cart approach to the platform, and a loading bank. A single loop was provided, originally listed as having space for 15 wagons but gradually increased in capacity until by 1911 it was recorded as having capacity for 45 wagons.

There was no dedicated goods shed originally provided, but in 1928 a galvanised iron shed measuring 12 feet by 8 feet was approved for transfer from Fordell station for storage of manures, etc. at Waiongona. The cost of the move was approximately £50.

In 1941 approval was sought from a local delivery goods loop to be provided for wagon loads of goods, as the existing loop was used for passing of trains. Due to wartime pressures, it wasn't until March 1946 that this was provided, with a twelve-wagon loop added for local traffic. The goods shed and loop were moved accordingly.

Unfortunately for the station, this change did little to secure the station's future, as in November 1955 it was noted that "Siding not used in over twelve months; goods shed not used for years." and in 1956 the siding and goods shed closed to goods traffic, but the station remained open for passenger, parcels, and goods traffic in small lots. The end came soon afterwards and on 13 July 1958 the station was closed for both passenger and crossing purposes. By 15 October 1959 the crossing loop had been removed.

== Mangapapa and Aikenhead stations ==
Mangapapa and Aikenhead were two short-lived stations between Waiongona and Lepperton.

Aikenhead Station, also known in early documents as Aikenhead’s Clearing, functioned as a passenger stopping place located approximately one mile beyond the original Lepperton station site. It featured a platform and appeared in early public timetables, indicating its role in passenger traffic. The station was officially closed on 1 April 1885.

Mangapapa Station was a freight siding situated about 3½ miles from Sentry Hill. Unlike Aikenhead, Mangapapa did not appear in public timetables, suggesting it was never intended for passenger use. In 1885, a petition was submitted to relocate the platform from Aikenhead to Mangapapa, and in 1886 a request was made to add a shelter shed at the siding. However, by 1892 the Railways Department reported that “practically no business [was] done from this siding for some time.” It was located on a steep 1 in 23 grade, had minimal capacity—accommodating only two wagons—and lacked basic infrastructure such as a shed or platform. Originally installed to serve local firewood traffic, Mangapapa was deemed redundant and officially closed on 26 June 1893, with any residual freight traffic redirected to the newly relocated Waiongona station that opened on the same day.

== Today ==
Little remains at the site of either Waiongona station site other than the main line, which sees regular freight trains for New Plymouth.
