= New Zealand DSH class locomotive =

Type of diesel-hybrid locomotives being manufactured for KiwiRail

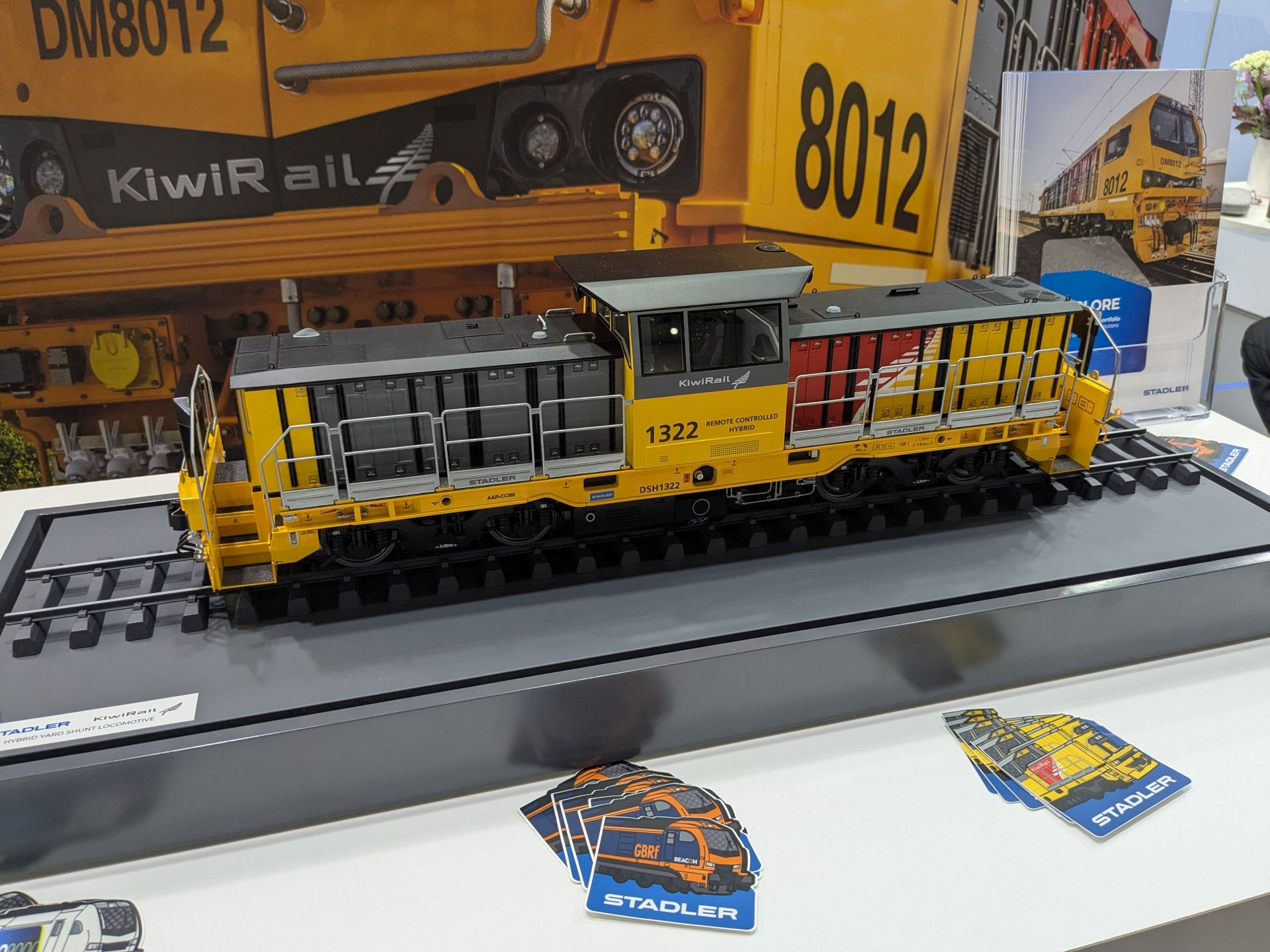
- Publicity model produced by Stadler of the DSH class locomotive
Type and origin
- Power type: Battery-diesel
- Builder: Stadler Rail, Valencia
Specifications
- Configuration
  - UIC: Bo′Bo′
- Gauge: 1,067 mm (3 ft 6 in)
- Fuel type: Diesel
- Prime mover: Catepillar C13B EU Stage V
- Engine type: diesel engine
Career
- Number in class: 24
- Delivered: 2027
- Current owner: KiwiRail

The New Zealand DSH class of battery-diesel hybrid shunting locomotives is under order for KiwiRail from Stadler Rail. 24 locomotives are on order from Stadler, with the first three expected to enter service in June 2027.

The locomotives are intended to replace the DSC class locomotives, the remainder of which were introduced in the 1960s. They will be the first hybrid locomotives in New Zealand since the E and EB class locomotives.

== See also ==
- Locomotives of New Zealand
