= Waitara Branch =

Railway branch line in New Zealand

Overview
- Other name(s): Waitara Industrial Line; New Plymouth - Waitara Railway
- Status: Preserved
- Owner: Waitara Railway Preservation Society
- Locale: Taranaki, New Zealand
- Termini: Lepperton railway station; Waitara
- Connecting lines: KiwiRail Marton–New Plymouth line
- Stations: 4

Service
- Type: Heavy Rail
- System: New Zealand Government Railways (NZGR)
- Operator(s): Railways Department; Waitara Railway Preservation Society

History
- Work began: 1872
- Opened: 14 October 1875
- Closed: 2 February 1999

Technical
- Line length: 7.25 km (4.50 mi)
- Num of tracks: Single
- Character: Rural, at-grade
- Track gauge: 3 ft 6 in (1,067 mm)

Map

The Waitara Branch is a 7.245 km long branch line railway in the Taranaki region of New Zealand's North Island. It was built as part of the region's first railway, linking New Plymouth with the closest suitable port, then the river port of Waitara. In 1884 the Breakwater port was opened in New Plymouth, but the line was saved when a (meat) freezing works was opened at Waitara in 1885.

For many years the line served the Borthwicks freezing works in town, until it closed in 1995. Services ceased on 16 June 1995. The branch was closed on 2 February 1999. The line has since been purchased by the Waitara Railway Preservation Society, who now operate tourist trains on the line.

== Construction ==
In 1872 surveys began for the best route and two were considered: a coastal route which was more direct, and an inland route which was longer, but more convenient for future extensions to the south. The inland route was chosen. The contract to build the railway was let in 1873 and the line was completed and opened in October 1875.

In 1874, while the land was being cleared at Sentry Hill for the new railway, the daughter of William Perrett (a labourer working on the line) was abducted after he had ignored requests not to dig through a Māori burial ground from the New Zealand Wars a decade earlier. Caroline Perrett (known to all as "Queenie") was not seen by her parents again and not rediscovered by her original family until 1926, 52 years after the incident occurred.

== Operation ==
The line was officially opened on 14 October 1875, with the first train departing New Plymouth with around 100 passengers. Trains were operated initially by two A class locomotives named "Fox" and "Ferret" which ran mixed trains services over the line. The first trip over the line took just 46 minutes to complete. Shortly after the railway was complete, extensions began due south from Sentry Hill alongside Mountain Road towards Inglewood, which was opened in 1877.

Waitara's role as the main port for New Plymouth did not last long. Shortly after the line was completed a breakwater was built at what is now Port Taranaki and Waitara became a local port only. The establishment of a freezing works in 1887 provided steady traffic over the line and prevented the line from closure. Other notable traffic included plants from the Duncan & Davies nurseries and produce from the Waitara Taranaki Co-operative Dairy Factory (later Moa-Nui Co-op Daries) sidings, both located at Waitara Road station.

The original track was replaced with 53lb rail in 1911, allowing heavier locomotives to work the line. Workers were camped in portable railway huts at Waitara Station.

=== Passenger Services ===
Passenger services were usually run as mixed services, with a service run early in the morning to take children to high school in New Plymouth, returning in the late afternoon. In 1877 there were two return services, operated from New Plymouth, with a third service added three times a week by 1883. By 1925, eight trains with passenger accommodation ran each way each day, connecting to the New Plymouth Express and three mixed services running between New Plymouth and Hawera in each direction. As well as regular services, picnic trains to Sentry Hill were popular in the late 19th and early 20th century.

Passenger accommodation was removed from Monday, 28 April 1946. They were replaced by buses operated by the Railways Road Service, who had purchased the private New Plymouth - Waitara bus service the previous year. These continued operating until 1991 when private enterprise took over the services.

== Motive power ==
When the Waitara - New Plymouth railway line was opened the rolling stock consisted of "two 11-ton A class locomotives, ...three carriages, three box wagons, six low-sided wagons, two brake vans, two weighbridges and 12 tarpaulins". However issues with hauling trains up the 1-35 grade out of New Plymouth or the 1-40 grade out from Waitara led to two new C class locomotives being introduced, with the older locomotives being relegated to shunting duties. The line continued to be served by tank engines for many years, including at various times F class and W^{F} class locomotives.

By the 1950s the line was operated by tender engines such as the A^{B} class, the last of which (A^{B} 708) departed Waitara Station on 8 November 1966. These were replaced with the DB class in the 1970s and DBR, DC and DSC class in the 1980s and 90s. In the final years it was not uncommon for trains to be replaced with trucks as tonnages declined.

== Stations ==
The following stations were located on the Waitara Branch. Distance measured from final junction in Lepperton.

Station Name	Distance	Opened	Closed Passenger	Closed Freight
Lepperton	0 km	12 November 1894	21 January 1983	22 Sep 1986
Sentry Hill	1.2 km	14 October 1875	29 April 1946	5 Dec 1963
Waitara Road	4.0 km	c. 1883	29 April 1946	2 Feb 1999
Waitara	6.8 km	14 October 1875	29 April 1946	2 Feb 1999

Station buildings at Waitara Road and Sentry Hill were simple Class 6 shelter sheds, befitting their status as flag stops only.

=== Waitara Station ===
Waitara's original Class 5 station building was located on the north side of the tracks (close to where the good shed was eventually located). The replacement Class 4 station building was located on the south (town) side of the yard when it was built in 1893, after lobbying from the Raleigh Town Board for the station to be in a more convenient location. This change of location created a situation where the passenger station was located on a loop in the goods yard, rather than the main line as is more usual.

The station complex was upgraded again at the end of 1911 with a full repaint and the addition of a veranda to the station building.

=== Sentry Hill Junction ===
The railway junction at Sentry Hill was built facing Waitara rather than New Plymouth. Initially, this made sense as Waitara was the major port for the region, but this decision required that all trains from New Plymouth to destinations south were required to stop and have the locomotive swap ends of the train to continue their journey. This operation became an increasing bottleneck in the system, especially after 1886 when through services began between Wellington and the new deep water port at the New Plymouth Breakwater. A proposed "loop line" bypassing Sentry Hill station and allowing the direct running of trains was eventually approved and opened in 1892, creating a triangle junction arrangement and avoiding the need to remarshal through trains between New Plymouth and points south.

With this solution came a new issue, however, as it caused direct trains to bypass the old Sentry Hill station site which was now located on the branch line instead of the main line. For a time, trains needing to stop at the station would reverse into or out of the station yard before continuing their journey, but this wasn't a satisfactory solution.

To fix this problem, in 1894 a new Sentry Hill passenger station was opened located roughly 49 chains south of the old station and just past the junction points for the new loop line. The old Sentry Hill station was closed and passenger facilities removed (though the yard and goods shed remained at the old location pending completion of the new station site).

The new Sentry Hill station location was not entirely satisfactory. There were complaints about poor access to the new platform, and the station location was located on a grade that was less than desirable from an operational perspective. In 1903 a new passenger shelter was even constructed at the old Sentry Hill station site after petitions from the local community and was served by branch line trains, despite the new station still being in operation a short distance away on the mainline.

=== Lepperton Junction ===
In 1907 it was decided to relocate the entire junction half a mile south to a more suitable site. The new site was closer to Lepperton than Sentry Hill and so the new junction was named Lepperton Junction. The station and yards opened in 1908 and included extending the Waitara Branch line parallel with the main line between the old and new station sites.

On the same date that Lepperton Junction opened both the “new” Sentry Hill station and the original Lepperton station (located closer to Manutahi Road) were closed to all traffic. From the same date the “old” Sentry Hill station was fully reopened, now serving as a branch line station only. The rails for the direct link between Waitara and New Plymouth remained in situ (though largely unused) until 1914. In that year the rails for the original direct link between Waitara and New Plymouth were finally lifted and the triangle junction arrangement was removed for good.

== Proposed extensions ==
=== Routes North ===
During the 1880s the final route for what would become the North Island Main Trunk railway between Auckland and Wellington was still being considered. The current route was decided in 1884, but, when it was realised just how difficult that route was, further surveys considered two other options in 1888. One of these was via Taumarunui to Waitara.

A practical route for the line was found by heading north from Waitara along the coast until reaching the Mimi River valley, before heading inland along the river valley. From the top of the valley, a tunnel to Tangarakau was needed, before following the Ohura River Valley. "The total distance is 40. miles, and the steepest gradient one in 50, and only two small tunnels will be required. The country is somewhat broken."

This proposal was still under consideration in 1893 (along with an alternative route linking just south of Stratford, which would eventually become the Stratford – Okahukara Line). An alternative survey considered taking the link up the Urenui River. A report in 1899 ended any chance of the route being built through Waitara, citing that the land for most of the route is not well suited for development and, as the route would not be able to compete with sea travel, the aim of the route should be to connect as much back country as possible with the local port instead.

=== Extension to Urenui ===
In 1911 the Clifton Country Council passed a resolution calling for the railway to be extended to the township of Urenui, a distance of approximately 9 miles (14 km). It was stated that "the ordinary traffic on the main road between Urenui and Waitara has increased to such proportions as to make a railway a matter of necessity," as well as citing the difficulty to sourcing suitable roading metal and the undue burden of the cost of maintaining the road. In 1912 North Taranaki Dairy Company lent their support to the idea, suggesting the extension run further to Mimi Junction.

Such an extension would have required a substantial bridge over the Waitara river, with an opening span to allow for steamer traffic to pass through.

=== Light railway to Te Kūiti ===
In 1920 another extension proposal was put forward by the Clifton County Council, this time for a light railway between Waitara and Te Kūiti via Mokau and its coal mines. Concern was raised by some councils that this might hamper the push for the completion of the Main North Road and the Mokau River bridge. Nothing came of this proposal.

== Notable events ==
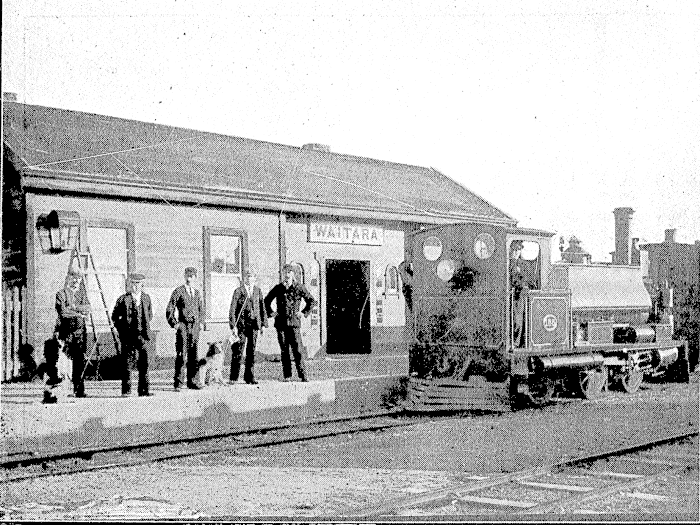
Waitara Railway Station in 1904.

At 2:00am on the morning of 15 June 1893, the station building at Waitara was burned to the ground by a fire originating in the lamp room of the building. It was reported that "all the records were burnt, but the safe with cash is intact." Consideration was given in the following months to relocating the Ngaire station building to Waitara as a replacement.

In 1929 preparations were made to replace the level crossing between the railway and Mamaku Road (later Devon Road and now part of State Highway 3) at Big Jim's Hill. This location had become the site of a few near-misses over the previous decades, including from 'trolleys' which provided no warning to road users of their approach. The level crossing was replaced with an overpass for the highway, known today as Big Jim's Overpass.

On the 3rd March 1962 A^{B}817 was taken for a joyride from the Waitara Engine shed to the top of Big Jims hill by four locals (including a former railways employee) in the early hours of the morning. The engine was then driven back to the Waitara station yard.

In the 13 July 1970 the Waitara railway station had part of its roof torn off in a tornado. The tornado (which travelled inland along Domett Street) also ripped roofs of several houses and the St Johns Anglican church hall.

At the other end of the line, the island railway station at Lepperton Junction was replaced in 1965 with a smaller station adjacent to Mountain Road (State Highway 3A), that survived onsite until 1994 when the building was removed (having been sold in 1992).

== Closure and preservation ==
In 1999, Tranz Rail announced that the Waitara Branch, along with the Hautapu-Cambridge section of the Cambridge Branch railway, were to close. After the AFFCO freezing works had closed, there was little prospect of much new freight traffic being on offer. On 25 May 1999 the Waitara Railway Preservation Society was formed with the aim to save the line. This goal was finally achieved in 2001 when the line was purchased with the help of grants from the Taranaki Electricity Trust and the TSB Community Trust.

Since that time passenger services have resumed and work is being done to rehabilitate the line. The former Tahora railway station building has been relocated to the site of the former Waitara Road station and various carriages, locomotives and other rolling stock is being restored to operational standards for use on the line. The former port sidings have been removed as part of a riverside redevelopment, shortening the branch to 7.03 km in length.

=== Other railway buildings ===
Aside from the railway proper, other railway buildings still exist in the vicinity. The former Sentry Hill goods shed is still extant a short distance from where it originally stood. It is visible behind the Lepperton Tennis Club courts on Manutahi Road, which has been there since the 1950s. In Waitara, two-thirds of the former Midhirst railway station sits on Memorial Place next to the War Memorial Hall. By the river mouth, the former north signal box from Stratford was relocated to Waitara in 1960 as a clubhouse for the Waitara Boating Club.

== Official name ==
When first opened the railway line was generally referred to using variations of "New Plymouth Waitara Railway." From 1877 when the line to Inglewood opened, it became the "Waitara Branch Railway" and this name was reconfirmed on 5 May 1977 in The New Zealand Gazette. On 13 August 1996 the line was officially renamed as the "Waitara Industrial Line", the legal name it carries to this day.

== See also ==
- Marton-New Plymouth Line
- Mount Egmont Branch
- Ōpunake/Kapuni Branch
- Stratford–Okahukura Line
