= Huirangi =

- Interactive map of Huirangi
- Coordinates: 39°3′13″S 174°14′56″E
- Country: New Zealand
- Region: Taranaki
- District: New Plymouth District
- Ward: Kōhanga Moa General Ward; Te Purutanga Mauri Pūmanawa Māori Ward
- Community: Inglewood Community
- Electorates: Taranaki-King Country; Te Tai Hauāuru (Māori)

Government
  - Territorial Authority: New Plymouth District Council
  - Regional council: Taranaki Regional Council
  - Mayor of New Plymouth: Max Brough
  - Taranaki-King Country MP: Barbara Kuriger
  - Te Tai Hauāuru MP: Debbie Ngarewa-Packer

Area
  - Total: 12.02 km^{2} (4.64 sq mi)

Population (2023 Census)
  - Total: 123
  - Density: 10.2/km^{2} (26.5/sq mi)

Huirangi is a settlement in Taranaki, New Zealand. Waitara lies about 7 kilometres to the north. The Waitara River flows to the east of the settlement, with the Bertrand Road suspension bridge providing access to the other side.

== Demographics ==
Huirangi locality covers 12.02 km^{2} (4.64 sq mi). The locality is part of the Everett Park statistical area.

Historical population
Year	Pop.	±% p.a.
2006	87	—
2013	105	+2.72%
2018	111	+1.12%
2023	123	+2.07%

The locality had a population of 123 in the 2023 New Zealand census, an increase of 12 people (10.8%) since the 2018 census, and an increase of 18 people (17.1%) since the 2013 census. There were 63 males, 60 females, and 3 people of other genders in 45 dwellings. 2.4% of people identified as LGBTIQ+. The median age was 36.9 years (compared with 38.1 years nationally). There were 33 people (26.8%) aged under 15 years, 15 (12.2%) aged 15 to 29, 57 (46.3%) aged 30 to 64, and 18 (14.6%) aged 65 or older.

People could identify as more than one ethnicity. The results were 90.2% European (Pākehā), 14.6% Māori, and 4.9% other, which includes people giving their ethnicity as "New Zealander". English was spoken by 100.0%, and other languages by 2.4%. The percentage of people born overseas was 7.3, compared with 28.8% nationally.

Religious affiliations were 26.8% Christian, and 2.4% New Age. People who answered that they had no religion were 58.5%, and 14.6% of people did not answer the census question.

Of those at least 15 years old, 18 (20.0%) people had a bachelor's or higher degree, 51 (56.7%) had a post-high school certificate or diploma, and 18 (20.0%) people exclusively held high school qualifications. The median income was $43,400, compared with $41,500 nationally. 9 people (10.0%) earned over $100,000 compared to 12.1% nationally. The employment status of those at least 15 was 51 (56.7%) full-time and 12 (13.3%) part-time.

== Education ==
Huirangi School is a coeducational contributing primary (years 1–6) school with a decile rating of 2 and a roll of 62. The school opened in 1872 and celebrated the school and district centennial jubilee in 1972.

== Notable residents ==
- Elsie Andrews (1888–1948), teacher and community leader
