= Lepperton railway station =

Railway station in New Zealand

Lepperton
- Aerial photo of Lepperton railway station in 1953

General information
- Other names: Lepperton Junction; Manutahi
- Location: Mountain Road; Lepperton 4373; New Zealand
- Coordinates: 39°03′4.31″S 174°11′56.49″E
- Elevation: 63 m (207 ft)
- System: New Zealand Government Railways (NZGR); Regional rail
- Line: Marton–New Plymouth line
- Distance: 196.15 km (121.88 mi) from Marton
- Platforms: Single side

Construction
- Structure type: at-grade
- Parking: No

History
- Opened: 30 November 1877
- Closed: 21 January 1983 (passengers); 22 September 1986 (freight)
- Rebuilt: 25 May 1908; February 1965
Route map
Station as at 1908
Location
Notes
- Previous station: Waiongona Station; Next station: Sentry Hill Station

Lepperton railway station is a rural railway station on the Marton–New Plymouth line serving the village of Lepperton in New Zealand's Taranaki district. It is also the junction with the 7.25-kilometre (4.50 mi) Waitara Branch railway line.

The station no longer has goods handling facilities but is still used for the crossing of trains. It is also used by the Waitara Railway Preservation Society as a destination for their trains from Waitara.

== History ==
The original railway station was opened on 30 November 1877, approximately 2.5 km (1 mile 45 chain) south of Sentry Hill, then the junction between the Waitara–New Plymouth Railway and the new southern line to Inglewood. The station was located close to the intersection of Mountain and Manutahi Roads. Facilities included a shelter shed and passenger platform, a loading bank for goods and a loop big enough to hold 26 wagons.

The station was originally called Manutahi, but this was changed in 1882 after the Patea–Wanganui railway reached the town of Manutahi in southern Taranaki and a new railway station was opened. To avoid confusion, this station was renamed Lepperton after the closest settlement. The station must have been fairly quiet as on 30 November 1894 petitioners were recorded as protesting against the closure of the station. The station remained open but bigger changes were in store.

In 1907, it was desired to interlock the Sentry Hill station yard (the next station to the north of Lepperton). However, Sentry Hill station was located on a grade that caused issues for trains proceeding southwards to get underway after stopping. To rectify this, a new station was built on flatter land south of Sentry Hill, and roughly 1,400 metres (70 chains) north of Lepperton Station. Because of the short distance between the proposed new station and the existing Lepperton station, the railways decided to close the existing station and name the new station Lepperton Junction. On 25 May 1908, the old station was closed.

== Lepperton Junction ==
The new Lepperton Junction was a much larger station. It featured an island platform with a station building and signal box, interlocked points and semaphore singles, water tanks, a mainline and passing loop on alternate sides of the station, and an engine turning triangle.

For goods traffic, there was also a goods shed and loading bank, stockyards, two goods loops off the main line that could hold 37 and 22 wagons respectively, two loops for branch line traffic that could hold 36 and 21 wagons, and a 19 wagon back shunt. Electricity was provided in 1927.

The Waitara branch railway was extended parallel to the main line from the former Sentry Hill to the new junction station, allowing for much easier transfers between branch and mainline services.

Despite protests that the new station was less convenient for locals (and that the name board for the station was unnecessarily hidden under the station verandas), the new station was much more successful operationally. In the early 20th century, most passenger services from the mainline were met with connecting services on the Waitara Branch, including the Hawera–New Plymouth mixed trains and the passenger-only New Plymouth Mail train to Wellington.

Aerial photograph of Lepperton railway station in April 1976

=== Replacement station ===
By 1965, the station and buildings were in a poor state of repair, so as part of the modernisation of New Zealand Railways, the original island station was demolished and replaced with a much smaller weatherboard station just south of the goods shed and stockyards. Shortly afterwards, the signal box and island platform were also removed, replaced with centralised traffic control and 3-aspect colour light signals.

The new station building featured a passenger waiting room and station master's office for tablet working. There were two dogboxes on the platform and a station master's house. The platform was a short, concrete-fronted passenger platform with electric lighting, long enough for the RM class Standard railcars then being used on New Plymouth–Wellington services. The new station building was not directly accessible to Waitara Branch trains, connecting passenger services on the branch having ceased almost 20 years earlier on 29 April 1946.

The station continued to serve the local district for many years, as well as goods and livestock traffic from the meat works in Waitara. In 1983, a new spur siding was laid for the transport of concrete prefabricated units for use in the construction of the new Petragas Chemicals methanol plant outside of Waitara.

== Decline and closure ==
On 21 January 1983, the New Plymouth–Taumaranui carriage train (final daytime successor to the New Plymouth Night Express) was terminated, ending all passenger services through Lepperton. By this time, all remaining mixed services had also been withdrawn.

In 1986, with the completion of the methanol plants, remaining freight was non-existent, and the station closed to goods traffic on 22 September. The station building was sold in 1992 and removed from the site in 1994. Trains stopped using the yard in 1997 after the closure of the Waitara freezing works, and the branch officially closed in 1999.

== Today ==
Today Lepperton Station is still used for the crossing of trains, and the station remains under CTC control. The two former branch sidings are leased to the Waitara Railway Preservation Society, which now owns the former branch line and uses the sidings to turn the society's trains.

Freight trains continue to pass through, but none stop at the station.
