= East Town Railway Workshops =

Coordinates: 39°54′42.02″S 175°3′46.26″E

- Type: Division of NZR
- Industry: Railways
- Defunct: 17 October 1986
- Fate: Dissolved due to rationalisation
- Successor: Aramoho Railway Workshops
- Headquarters: Wanganui, New Zealand
- Services: Heavy rail maintenance and vehicle construction
- Number of employees: 450+ (at time of closure)
- Parent: New Zealand Government Railways (NZGR)

The East Town Railway Workshops were a major manufacturing, maintenance and repair facility of the New Zealand Railways Department (NZR) located by the Marton - New Plymouth Line in the city of Wanganui in New Zealand's North Island. Output included not only rolling stock but also tools, equipment, huts, furniture and tarpaulins. It was a prodigious facility, and one of the larger employers in the city. Its name is sometimes formatted as Eastown or Easttown.

== History ==
East Town was commissioned in August 1880, and was the second North Island railway workshops established as part of Julius Vogel's Great Public Works policy. A contract was let in 1879 by public tender to the Wanganui firm of Gibbes and Pinches for the construction of a Locomotive Erecting Shop, Machine Shop and Wood Mill. The following year, a second contract was let to Thomson and McLean to construct the Blacksmiths Shop and attached Boiler Shop. Work up to 1900 focused on the repair of rolling stock operated in the area between Taranaki and Hawke's Bay.

In 1900, the Engine Shed was relocated to the north-west corner of the yard. A single-road Paint Shop was erected, a wagon servicing pit was built, and the Erecting Shop was extended.

As a result of the Royal Commission of 1925 conducted by English railwaymen Sir Sam Fay and Sir Vincent Raven, the output of the workshops changed. The capacity of the Locomotive Shop was dramatically reduced, and the Tarpaulin Shop expanded to handle the production requirements of the entire North Island. The Points and Crossings Shop previously located at the Addington Workshops was relocated to East Town.

East Town had been operating as two complete sets of workshops for both the Maintenance Branch and the Locomotive Branch, separated by only a road. In August 1931, it was decided to amalgamate the facilities into a single operation, a move that proved to be beneficial for the staff in the form of improved conditions and schedules. As a result of this amalgamation, it was necessary to move the Points and Crossings Shop to the Hutt Workshops, and the workshops once again focused on the repair of locomotives, carriages and brake vans. Later work done at East Town also included the manufacture and repair of tools, velocipedes, track gauges, railway huts, furniture for railway stations and offices, and heavy track machinery. Overhauls on shunting locomotives were also carried out at East Town from 1963, work that was previously done at the Hutt Workshops.

Between 1947 and 1949, land was purchased at the west end of the yard and various workshop buildings were extended. A new Motor Shop was also erected. The first intake of apprentices, comprising nine carpenters and six fitters, started in January 1949 once a suitable building had been acquired. Further extensions were made to the Tarpaulin Shop in 1950, and a new Wagon Shop was also built.

East Town became particularly well known was the production of tarpaulins to cover goods wagons which were used at stations across the country. These were originally made of canvas and treated with linseed oil and vegetable black to weather-proof them. As the work was initially done by hand, those employed to make them were usually sailmakers by trade, with mechanisation not introduced until 1915. At the end of 1914, a new Tarpaulin Shop was commissioned, but it did not last long, being destroyed by fire in January 1915. In 1928, a dedicated tarpaulin factory was opened and, with the transfer of staff from the Newmarket Workshops, production increased to the rate of 50 tarpaulins per week. The Tarpaulin Manufacturing Shop was razed by fire on 5 August 1954, requiring an increase in the output of the Addington Workshops until the destroyed facility at East Town was replaced mid-1955. Just two months later, on 18 October, the Tarpaulin Depot Repair Shop was similarly destroyed. In 1973, NZR switched to using PVC tarpaulins which were cheaper to make and easier to repair.

East Town closed on 17 October 1986 as the result of an effort by the New Zealand Railways Corporation to rationalise its workshop facilities around the country. At the time it closed, it was the employer of over 450 local residents. At the same time the Aramoho Plant Zone workshops were retained and slightly expanded, at a cost of $866,000, but they have also since been closed.

== Rolling stock ==
Some of the rolling stock work conducted at East Town included:

- An order in 1951 for the production of 150 K^{C} class box wagons.
- The servicing of K class steam locomotives from 1932 until 1967.
- The repair, in October 1946, of A^{B}, F, K, and W^{W} class locomotives.
- Overhauling and engine upgrades for DB and DI class diesel locomotives from 1976 to 1980.
- An order in mid 1979 for 85 YH class ballast wagons.
- Overhauling the entire fleet of DE class locomotives, circa 1980.
- Sharing in the re-engining of DSC class locomotives with Auckland and Palmerston North workshops.
- Overhauling the DM/D class electric multiple units.
