= Lepperton =

Settlement in Taranaki, New Zealand

- Interactive map of Lepperton
- Coordinates: 39°3′37″S 174°12′38″E
- Country: New Zealand
- Region: Taranaki Region
- Territorial authority: New Plymouth District
- Ward: North General Ward; Te Purutanga Mauri Pūmanawa Māori Ward
- Community: Waitara Community
- Electorates: New Plymouth; Te Tai Hauāuru (Māori)

Government
  - Territorial Authority: New Plymouth District Council
  - Regional council: Taranaki Regional Council
  - Mayor of New Plymouth: Max Brough
  - New Plymouth MP: David MacLeod
  - Te Tai Hauāuru MP: Debbie Ngarewa-Packer

Area
  - Total: 1.26 km^{2} (0.49 sq mi)

Population (June 2025)
  - Total: 410
  - Density: 330/km^{2} (840/sq mi)

Lepperton is a small village in North Taranaki, New Zealand. It is approximately 6 km (3.7 mi) inland from Waitara township, 5 km (3.1 mi) west of the Waitara River, and 1 km (0.62 mi) east of State Highway 3A, which connects Inglewood to Waitara.

== Demographics ==
Lepperton is described by Statistics New Zealand as a rural settlement which covers 1.26 km^{2} (0.49 sq mi). It had an estimated population of 410 as of June 2025, with a population density of 325 people per km^{2}. Lepperton is part of the larger Lepperton-Brixton statistical area.

Historical population for Lepperton
Year	Pop.	±% p.a.
2006	300	—
2013	231	−3.66%
2018	294	+4.94%
2023	384	+5.49%
The 2006 population is for a larger area of 7.63 km^{2}. Source:

Lepperton had a population of 384 in the 2023 New Zealand census, an increase of 90 people (30.6%) since the 2018 census, and an increase of 153 people (66.2%) since the 2013 census. There were 195 males and 186 females in 129 dwellings. 0.8% of people identified as LGBTIQ+. The median age was 35.8 years (compared with 38.1 years nationally). There were 99 people (25.8%) aged under 15 years, 48 (12.5%) aged 15 to 29, 192 (50.0%) aged 30 to 64, and 42 (10.9%) aged 65 or older.

People could identify as more than one ethnicity. The results were 90.6% European (Pākehā), 17.2% Māori, 3.9% Pasifika, 5.5% Asian, and 3.1% other, which includes people giving their ethnicity as "New Zealander". English was spoken by 96.1%, Māori by 1.6%, and other languages by 3.1%. No language could be spoken by 3.1% (e.g. too young to talk). The percentage of people born overseas was 10.2, compared with 28.8% nationally.

Religious affiliations were 24.2% Christian, 0.8% Hindu, and 0.8% other religions. People who answered that they had no religion were 64.8%, and 8.6% of people did not answer the census question.

Of those at least 15 years old, 54 (18.9%) people had a bachelor's or higher degree, 180 (63.2%) had a post-high school certificate or diploma, and 57 (20.0%) people exclusively held high school qualifications. The median income was $50,700, compared with $41,500 nationally. 42 people (14.7%) earned over $100,000 compared to 12.1% nationally. The employment status of those at least 15 was 168 (58.9%) full-time, 45 (15.8%) part-time, and 6 (2.1%) unemployed.

=== Lepperton-Brixton ===
Lepperton-Brixton statistical area covers 46.52 km^{2} (17.96 sq mi) and had an estimated population of 1,970 as of June 2025, with a population density of 42 people per km^{2}.

Historical population for Lepperton-Brixton
Year	Pop.	±% p.a.
2006	1,296	—
2013	1,524	+2.34%
2018	1,725	+2.51%
2023	1,893	+1.88%

Lepperton-Brixton had a population of 1,893 in the 2023 New Zealand census, an increase of 168 people (9.7%) since the 2018 census, and an increase of 369 people (24.2%) since the 2013 census. There were 960 males, 930 females, and 6 people of other genders in 690 dwellings. 1.4% of people identified as LGBTIQ+. The median age was 42.3 years (compared with 38.1 years nationally). There were 387 people (20.4%) aged under 15 years, 258 (13.6%) aged 15 to 29, 903 (47.7%) aged 30 to 64, and 342 (18.1%) aged 65 or older.

People could identify as more than one ethnicity. The results were 89.1% European (Pākehā); 20.4% Māori; 1.4% Pasifika; 3.8% Asian; 0.5% Middle Eastern, Latin American and African New Zealanders (MELAA); and 3.3% other, which includes people giving their ethnicity as "New Zealander". English was spoken by 97.9%, Māori by 3.6%, and other languages by 4.9%. No language could be spoken by 1.7% (e.g. too young to talk). New Zealand Sign Language was known by 0.3%. The percentage of people born overseas was 11.1, compared with 28.8% nationally.

Religious affiliations were 26.8% Christian, 0.2% Hindu, 0.5% Islam, 0.5% Māori religious beliefs, 0.2% Buddhist, 0.5% New Age, and 0.6% other religions. People who answered that they had no religion were 60.7%, and 9.7% of people did not answer the census question.

Of those at least 15 years old, 225 (14.9%) people had a bachelor's or higher degree, 912 (60.6%) had a post-high school certificate or diploma, and 369 (24.5%) people exclusively held high school qualifications. The median income was $43,400, compared with $41,500 nationally. 180 people (12.0%) earned over $100,000 compared to 12.1% nationally. The employment status of those at least 15 was 789 (52.4%) full-time, 285 (18.9%) part-time, and 24 (1.6%) unemployed.

== Kairoa Pa ==
Near Lepperton is Kairoa Pa, an historic centre for local Maori settlement. It is also an entry point for the Whakaahurangi track to Ketemarae Pa near Normanby. This track linked northern and southern Taranaki before British settlement.

== Climate ==
Climate data for Lepperton, New Zealand
Month	Jan	Feb	Mar	Apr	May	Jun	Jul	Aug	Sep	Oct	Nov	Dec	Year
Daily mean °C (°F)	17 (63)	17 (63)	16 (61)	14 (57)	12 (54)	10 (50)	9 (48)	10 (50)	11 (52)	12 (54)	14 (57)	16 (61)	13 (55)
Average precipitation mm (inches)	103 (4.1)	92 (3.6)	105 (4.1)	124 (4.9)	145 (5.7)	149 (5.9)	158 (6.2)	139 (5.5)	111 (4.4)	117 (4.6)	120 (4.7)	119 (4.7)	1,481 (58.3)
Source: Weatherbase

== Education ==
Lepperton School is a coeducational contributing primary (years 1-6) school with a roll of 123 students as of July 2026. The school was founded in 1870.
