= Urenui =

Settlement in Taranaki, New Zealand

- Interactive map of Urenui
- Coordinates: 39°00′S 174°23′E
- Country: New Zealand
- Region: Taranaki Region
- Territorial authority: New Plymouth District
- Ward: North General Ward; Te Purutanga Mauri Pūmanawa Māori Ward
- Community: Clifton Community
- Electorates: Taranaki-King Country; Te Tai Hauāuru (Māori)

Government
  - Territorial Authority: New Plymouth District Council
  - Regional council: Taranaki Regional Council
  - Taranaki-King Country MP: Barbara Kuriger
  - Te Tai Hauāuru MP: Debbie Ngarewa-Packer

Area
  - Total: 3.65 km^{2} (1.41 sq mi)

Population (June 2025)
  - Total: 460
  - Density: 130/km^{2} (330/sq mi)

Urenui is a settlement in northern Taranaki, in the North Island of New Zealand. It is located on State Highway 3 close to the shore of the North Taranaki Bight, 13 kilometres east of Waitara and 6 km south-west of Mimi. The Urenui River flows past the settlement into the North Taranaki Bight.

== Etymology ==
The New Zealand Ministry for Culture and Heritage gives a translation of "great courage" for Urenui, noting that courage is "a figurative expression". A fuller explanation is that the name was given by Manaia in honour of his well-endowed son. Ure means "penis", and nui means "large".

== History ==
The town was the site of the Urenui Redoubt, created in winter 1865 during the Second Taranaki War. Originally envisioned as a settlement for Māori loyal to the colonial government, however by 1866 it was decided that the town should be a settlement for soldiers.

== Demographics ==
Urenui is described by Stats NZ as a rural settlement, which covers 3.65 km^{2} (1.41 sq mi). It had an estimated population of 460 as of June 2025, with a population density of 126 people per km^{2}. It is part of the larger Tikorangi statistical area, which covers 167.79 km^{2} (64.78 sq mi).

Historical population
| Year | Pop. | ±% p.a. |
|---|---|---|
| 2006 | 429 | — |
| 2013 | 429 | +0.00% |
| 2018 | 411 | −0.85% |
| 2023 | 447 | +1.69% |

Urenui had a population of 447 in the 2023 New Zealand census, an increase of 36 people (8.8%) since the 2018 census, and an increase of 18 people (4.2%) since the 2013 census. There were 222 males and 225 females in 204 dwellings. 1.3% of people identified as LGBTIQ+. The median age was 49.8 years (compared with 38.1 years nationally). There were 72 people (16.1%) aged under 15 years, 51 (11.4%) aged 15 to 29, 201 (45.0%) aged 30 to 64, and 123 (27.5%) aged 65 or older.

People could identify as more than one ethnicity. The results were 89.9% European (Pākehā), 28.2% Māori, 1.3% Pasifika, 0.7% Asian, and 1.3% other, which includes people giving their ethnicity as "New Zealander". English was spoken by 98.0%, Māori by 6.0%, and other languages by 1.3%. No language could be spoken by 1.3% (e.g. too young to talk). New Zealand Sign Language was known by 0.7%. The percentage of people born overseas was 8.1, compared with 28.8% nationally.

Religious affiliations were 27.5% Christian, 0.7% New Age, and 0.7% other religions. People who answered that they had no religion were 61.7%, and 9.4% of people did not answer the census question.

Of those at least 15 years old, 48 (12.8%) people had a bachelor's or higher degree, 231 (61.6%) had a post-high school certificate or diploma, and 93 (24.8%) people exclusively held high school qualifications. The median income was $33,900, compared with $41,500 nationally. 36 people (9.6%) earned over $100,000 compared to 12.1% nationally. The employment status of those at least 15 was 174 (46.4%) full-time, 57 (15.2%) part-time, and 6 (1.6%) unemployed.

== Marae ==
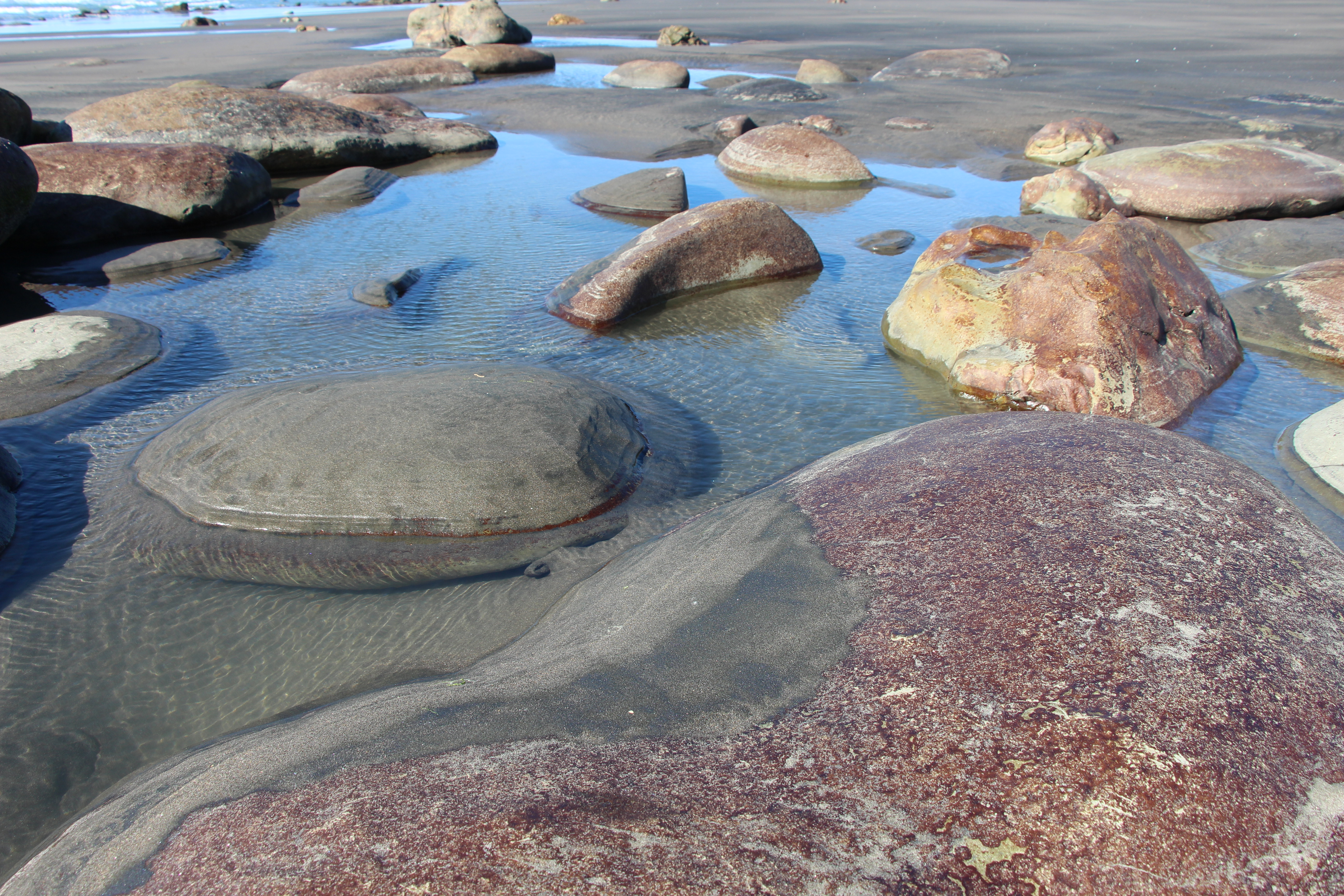
Urenui beach

Urenui Marae, located about 3 kilometres from the town, is the only remaining marae of Ngāti Mutunga. It includes Te Aroha meeting house.

In October 2020, the Government committed $363,060 from the Provincial Growth Fund to upgrade the marae, creating 21 jobs.

== Education ==
Urenui School is a coeducational contributing primary (years 1–6) school with a roll of 96 students as of July 2026. The school was founded in 1876 and celebrated its 125th jubilee in 2001.

== Notable people ==
- Māui Pōmare, politician
- Te Rangi Hīroa (Sir Peter Buck), doctor, politician

== See also ==
- Ngāti Mutunga
- Taranaki Region
