= New Zealand DSC class locomotive =

Heavy shunting locomotive

New Zealand DSC class
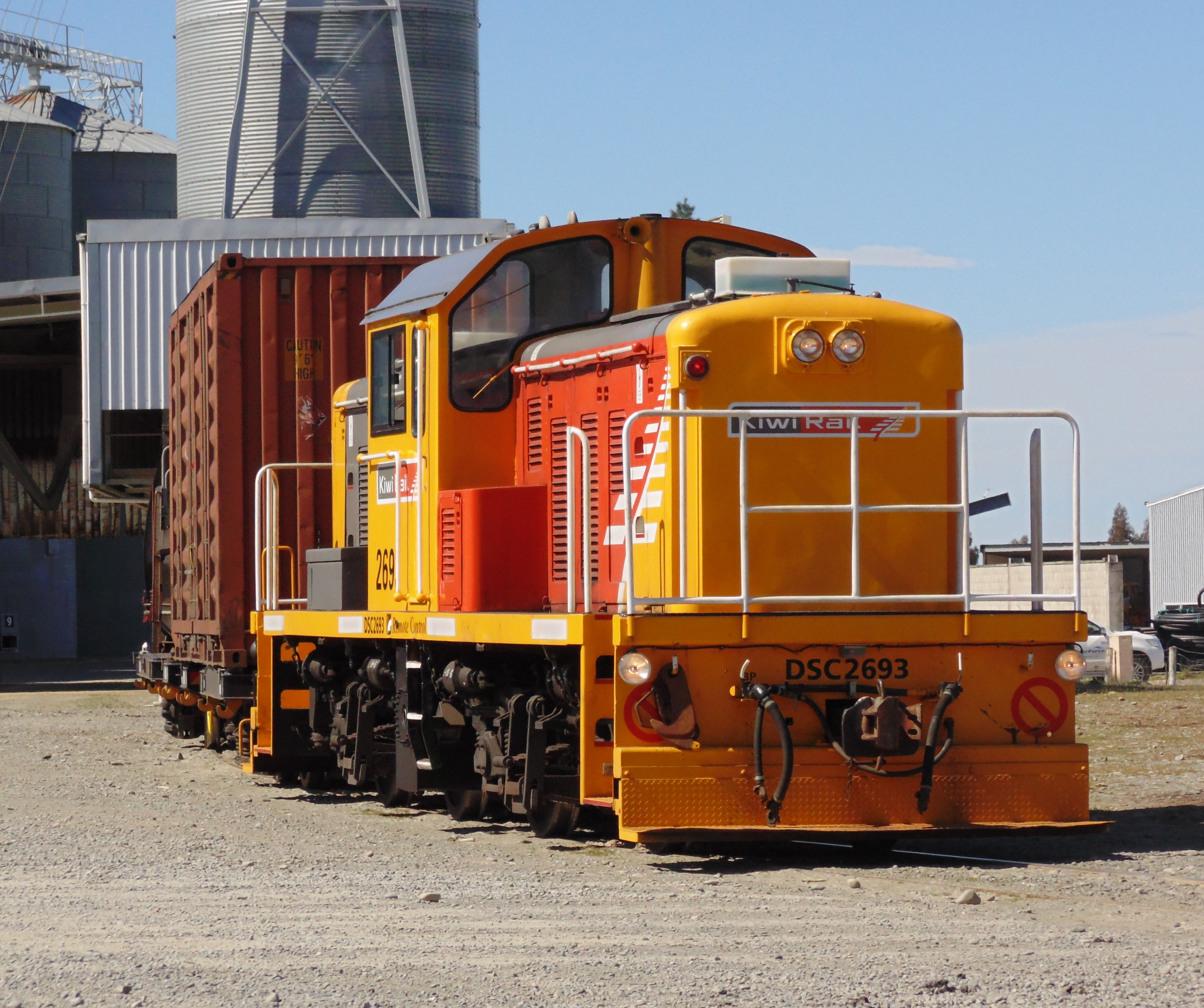
- DSC 2693 with a shunt north of Ashburton
Type and origin
- Power type: Diesel-electric
- Builder: British Thomson-Houston (18), NZR Hillside Workshops and Addington Workshops (52)
- Build date: 1958–1967
Specifications
- Configuration
  - UIC: Bo-Bo
- Gauge: 1,067 mm (3 ft 6 in)
- Length: 11.66 m (38 ft 3 in)
- Width: 2.54 m (8 ft 4 in)
- Height: 3.5 m (11 ft 6 in)
- Loco weight: 41.1 tonnes (40.5 long tons; 45.3 short tons)
- Prime mover: BTH: Rolls-Royce C6SFL, 2 off; later: Rolls-Royce C6TFL, 2 off. NZR: Leyland UE902, 2 off; later: Cummins NT855, 2 off.
Performance figures
- Maximum speed: 64 km/h (40 mph)
- Power output: 315 kW (422 hp)
- Tractive effort: 46 kN (10,300 lbf)
Career
- Operators: New Zealand Railways, Tranz Rail, Toll Rail, KiwiRail
- Number in class: 70
- Numbers: Early numbers: 400–469; TMS numbers: 2000–2759
- Locale: All of New Zealand
- First run: 24 March 1959 - 12 December 1967
- Retired: February 1989 – present
- Disposition: 28 in service 2 withdrawn 34 scrapped 3 preserved 3 are owned by industrial users

The New Zealand DSC class locomotive (Note: Following the introduction of TMS in 1979, the class classification was capitalised, whereas previously the second letter was a smaller capital letter, that is D^{SC}) is a heavy shunting locomotive used throughout New Zealand. The class was built in seven batches, the first 18 locomotives being built by British Thomson-Houston of the United Kingdom, with the further 52 locomotives being built by New Zealand Railways (NZR).

The class is widely used in both the North and South Islands of New Zealand, mainly for heavy yard shunting, although some members of the class have been used for local mainline shunting services. All remaining members of the class are now fitted with shunters refuges, and most are fitted with remote control capabilities.

== Design ==
In the late 1950s, NZR needed a suitable heavy shunting locomotive that produced more power than the existing D^{S} and D^{SA} class locomotives and would be suitable for replacing the B^{B}, C, and W^{F} class steam locomotives. In 1958, an order was placed with British Thompson-Houston in association with the Clayton Equipment Company for eighteen centre-cab shunting engines with a horsepower output of around 420 hp (310 kW).

== Introduction ==
The new locomotives, allocated road numbers D^{SC} 400-417, entered service in 1959-60 and were allocated to Auckland and Frankton Junction (Hamilton). For a time in 1962, D^{SC} 402 was dispatched to Picton to shunt the NZR inter-island rail and road ferry GMV Aramoana until newly constructed Addington D^{SC} 418 arrived to take over, allowing 402 to return north.

The BTH locomotives were powered by two 6-cylinder inline 210 hp (160 kW) Rolls-Royce C6SFL diesel engines connected to BTH generators, which were in turn coupled to four BTH traction motors, one to each axle. Issues arose with the air brakes and spare parts for the diesel engines among others problems. Once these were resolved, the class settled down to work reliably in their intended role.

Two further orders were placed with the NZR Addington and Hillside Workshops in the 1960s, with production running from 10 August 1962 to 12 December 1967. The NZR-built locomotives were different in that they were powered by two Leyland UE902 diesel engines producing 210 hp (160 kW), and had electrical equipment built by Associated Electrical Industries Ltd (AEI), which had purchased BTH earlier. Again there were various troubles, this time more to do with the mechanical components and compatibility on later batches.

== In service ==
In the late 1970s, New Zealand Railways decided to undertake a re-engining programme for the DSC class. Due to design differences, it would not be possible to use the same type of diesel engine across all locomotives, so two different types were selected:

- All BTH locomotives would be repowered with the Rolls-Royce C6TFL diesel engine.
- All NZR locomotives would be repowered with the Cummins NT855 diesel engine.

The process was spread out from the late 1970s into the early 1980s. As part of this, some locomotives were repainted in the International Orange livery but with their pre-TMS numbers instead of the later TMS numbers. As a result of this, the locomotives were equipped with new radiator header tanks which were mounted behind the radiator on top of the engine hoods in a 'north-south' alignment. Later the tanks were relocated to an 'east-west' alignment.

=== Renumbering ===
The introduction of the Traffic Monitoring System (TMS) in 1979 saw the locomotives renumbered.

=== Shunter's refuges ===
In 1994, DSC 2406 was trialled as the first shunting locomotive to be fitted with shunter's refuges at either end of the locomotive. New recessed steps were fitted at either end of the locomotive frames with a vertical handrail on the running board proper. The locomotive's engine hoods were not shortened at the time.

This modification was successful, but it was noted that the engine hoods were a potential constraint. All further DSC class locomotives equipped with the refuges had their engine hoods shortened by 500 mm (20 in), necessitating the relocation of the radiator header tanks to their present 'east-west' alignment.

This modification was subsequently made to all DSG, DSJ, and DH class locomotives as well as DAR517. None of the BTH-built DSC class locomotives were fitted with these refuges and several NZR-built examples did not receive them either, due to withdrawal before they could be fitted or by dint of being used for other purposes.

== Disposal ==
As of September 2018, 42 units have been withdrawn from service.

=== British Thomson-Houston locomotives ===
As a part of the program of the New Zealand Railways Corporation to rationalize the locomotive fleet in the late 1980s, all of the British Thomson-Houston built locomotives were withdrawn. All, besides one, were scrapped either at Otahuhu Workshops, or at Hutt Workshops between October 1989 and early 1990.

DSC 2067 was given a reprieve when it was sold to the NZ Dairy Group (later subsumed into Fonterra) to shunt their Waharoa dairy factory. In 2003, the locomotive was overhauled at the Westfield servicing facility. The overhaul included repairs and a repaint. In 2007, the locomotive was sold to Alliance Group Limited to shunt at their Pukeuri freezing works on the outskirts of Oamaru. In the late 2000s/early 2010s, it was repainted into the Alliance Group's yellow livery, and the locomotives two Rolls-Royce engines were replaced with two Cummins engines.

=== NZR locomotives ===
With the rationalization of the locomotive fleet in the late 1980s, three of the NZR-built DSCs were withdrawn in 1989. Between 1989 and 1990, two units were laid up after being damaged due to accidents. Between 1998 and 2013, at least 20 units were laid up due to being either, surplus to requirements, due to accident damage or catching fire. Eleven were scrapped, and the rest were either returned to service or sold. The frame of DSC2231 was used as a test-bed for overhauled Cummins engines after being withdrawn. In September 2015, DSC2338 was also laid up and sent to Hutt Workshops for storage.

The first unit to be preserved, DSC2759, was purchased by Ian Welch in August 2002. The locomotive was moved to Mainline Steams Plimmerton depot. The locomotive was repainted in Mainline Steams variation of the Tranz Rail Blue livery. It was named "Show Pony". This locomotive was purchased from Ian Welch by the Gisborne City Vintage Railway and arrived in Gisborne on 14 August 2020. (It had to be transported by road as the Wairoa - Muriwai section of the railway line had still not been repaired from the storm damage sustained in March 2012.) The second unit to be preserved, DSC 2584, was purchased by the Waitara Railway Preservation Society in January 2003. In 2011, the locomotive was repainted in their own livery, of dark blue and light yellow.

Two units were also sold, but this time to industrial users. DSC 2421 was sold to Alliance Group for their freezing works in Lorneville in July 2002. The locomotive was given a mechanical tidy-up at Hutt Workshops, and was repainted in the company's livery with a grey cab, yellow hoods and thin red chevron stripes on the ends, and is still in service. The other unit, DSC 2257, was sold sometime in 2007 to Ravensdown Fertilizer for their New Plymouth plant. The locomotive had been on loan to the company for a time before being sold. It was placed into storage due to operational reasons and had been cheaper to hire a locomotive from KiwiRail. In 2016, the locomotive was sold to the Waitara Railway Preservation Society.

In August 2016, KiwiRail issued a Request for Quotation (RFQ) via the Government Electronic Tendering Service (GETS) for DSCs 2285, 2338, 2434 and 2680. Following the sale of the four DSCs, 2285, 2434 and 2680 were scrapped in March 2017, and 2338 was sold to DBM Contracting. In November 2017, 2366 was withdrawn and sent to Hutt Workshops, with 2543 following in February 2018. The latter is now officially written off.

=== Replacement ===
In August 2017, KiwiRail announced they were in discussions with global suppliers including General Electric, Electro-Motive Diesel, Alstom, CRRC and Stadler Rail to construct replacements for the remainder of the class. It was expected the first of the replacements to arrive in 2020-21.

The tender was eventually awarded to Stadler Rail in 2024, for an order of 24 diesel-hybrid locomotives, to be classified as the DSH class locomotive. The DSH class are expected to begin to enter service in June 2027.
