= AFFCO Holdings =

New Zealand meat processor

AFFCO Holdings Limited
- Formerly: Auckland Farmers' Freezing Co-Operative
- Type: Subsidiary
- Industry: Meat Processing; Tannery
- Founded: 1904 in Auckland, New Zealand
- Headquarters: Hamilton City, New Zealand
- Key people: Nigel Stevens, CFO
- Products: Beef; Veal; Pelts; Lamb
- Revenue: ▲$968 million NZD
- Number of employees: 2800+
- Parent: Talley's Group
- Divisions: Affco USA, Inc; Affco Europe Ltd
- Website: www.affco.co.nz

AFFCO Holdings Limited, commonly referred to as AFFCO or "Auckland Farmers Freezing Company", is New Zealand's fourth largest meat processor. AFFCO has been in operations since 1904. It has been wholly owned by Talley's Group since 2010 and it is currently one of the few remaining Talley's owned companies to employ unionised workers at their plants. AFFCO has twelve plants in New Zealand.

== History ==
In 2002 AFFCO acquired all shares of shareholders that held 1,000 shares or less. This buyback accounted for 0.87% of all shares listed at the time and effectively removed over 7,000 shareholders from its share register.

In 2004 AFFCO acquired New Zealand's largest processor of Bobby Calves Dairy Meats New Zealand Ltd for $42.2 million.

In 2007, Affco through its subsidiary Dairy Trust acquired 55.5% Waikato-based dairy exporter Open Country Cheese Limited for an undisclosed amount. In December 2013, AFFCO's shareholding was raised to 70.5% after Talleys; through AFFCO, purchased 14.99% from Olam International.

== Talley's ==
Talley's takeover began in 2001 after the fishery acquired a 10% stake on top of its existing 1.3% stake for $6 million (NZD).

In 2003, after multiple bids, Talley's successfully raised its shareholding to 37% after purchasing 11% from Hugh Green Investments.

In March 2006, Talley's made another bid to acquire more shares in AFFCO taking their stake to 50.01% from its then 40% stake. It was also reported that Talley's has been constantly been acquiring shares in AFFCO through both on-market and off-market acquisitions. Later in the year Talley's closed its bid receiving an 18% stake from several minor shareholders taking its stake to just over 58%.

In 2010 it was reported that Talley's had come to an agreement to purchase John Spencer's stake in AFFCO by purchasing his shares held by Toocooya Nominees increasing its shareholding to 76.2% for $43.9 million. Later in the year Talley's launched a full-scale takeover of AFFCO.

By October 2010, Talley's had acquired 90.474% of all AFFCO shares forcing a compulsory acquisition to occur giving Talley's 100% of all AFFCO shares. AFFCO was subsequently de-listed from the NZX.

== Controversy ==
In 2006 AFFCO fired multiple workers under suspicion of a theft ring was operating in its Wairoa plant. In 2007 an Employment Relations Authority court found in favor of the fired workers for unjustified dismissal and awarded upwards of $60,000 combined as compensation and unpaid wages.

In 2014 AFFCO was fined over $30,000 after firing a worker for refusing to work on the Sabbath as it was against his religion. The worker took the case to the Human Rights Review Tribunal as an infringement on his human right to religion.

=== Strikes ===
In 2012 a strike occurred throughout all AFFCO Meatworks plants after AFFCO locked out over 750 union workers. After weeks of protest the strike found support in multiple organisations, including the Mana Party and the New Zealand Labour Party. The strike was called off after AFFCO and the New Zealand Meatworkers came to an agreement after 12 weeks of striking.

In June 2015 another strike broke out after lockouts started occurring once again after a contractual disagreement between New Zealand Meatworkers and AFFCO regarding individual contracts and seasonal workers. In early-2016 the Employment Court ruled that AFFCO had illegally locked out workers and ruled that the company must allow workers back to work.

In March 2016 more strikes occurred after AFFCO announced staff layoffs.

=== Unsafe working conditions ===
In 2008 AFFCO received fines amounting to $75,000 after failing to ensure a safe working environment after a worker had his finger cut off during work.

In 2010 AFFCO was fined up to $53,000 after failing to ensure a safe working environment after a workers leg was broken after being trapped in a machine that did not have appropriate safety gear.

In July 2012 AFFCO was fined over $62,000 after failing to ensure a safe working environment after a worker fell 7 metres (23 ft) into a carton well area. Preventative measures taken after the initial probability of accident was noticed, including installing a gate at the top of the well-shaft and providing employees with a fall arrest harness, were not sufficient to prevent the fall from happening.

In February 2015 AFFCO was fined $5,000 after the Employment Relations Authority found that a former worker was unjustifiably dismissed after launching complaints of bullying in the workplace.

==== Meat hook incident ====
In 2014 it was reported that a male at the Rangiuru site was impaled in the cheek during work. In June 2015 AFFCO was charged by Worksafe New Zealand under the Health and Safety Employment Act. After an investigation it was found that AFFCO had not followed company safety regulations and was found guilty of breaking the Health and Safety Employment Act. After a lengthy trial AFFCO was fined $30,000 for failing to uphold the Health and Safety Employment Act. They were also fined a further $25,000 in reparation fees for the impaled worker.

==== Sewage discharge ====
Affco NZ Ltd processing plant at Moerewa and Wairoa are a major source of trade wastewater in the form of e. coli contamination to freshwater streams.

== In popular culture ==
- AFFCO is the subject of a song by New Zealand band The Skeptics which is best known for its music video that includes graphic scenes of animals being slaughtered.
- AFFCO was the subject of a Billy T James song sketch "AFFCO Man", based on The Village People's song "Macho Man".
