= Waitara River =

River in New Zealand

Coordinates: 38°59′S 174°14′E

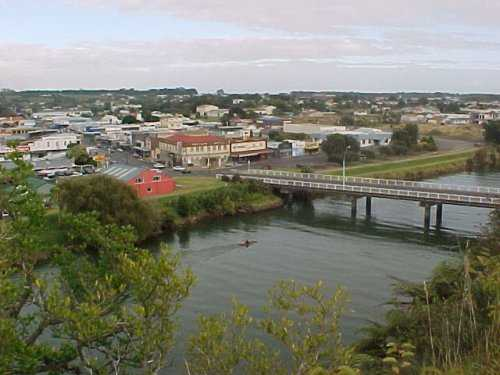
Waitara River in Waitara

The source of the Waitara River lies in the very steep hill country to the east of Mount Taranaki/Egmont, near Tahora. After proceeding in a southwesterly direction toward Central Taranaki, the river abruptly turns to flow in a northwesterly direction to the Tasman Sea: meeting it at the coastal town of Waitara.

The river once had a dock in Waitara, where export meat from the town's Thos. Borthwick & Sons freezing-works was loaded onto ships. However, this trade was subsequently conducted from New Plymouth's Port Taranaki until the works closed in 1995.

The Waitara is the first mud-bottomed river to the north of Cape Egmont. It is prone to flooding, and there are stop banks (levees) to the west of the river (upstream from the bridge) and on both sides downstream.

The historic Bertrand Road suspension bridge, (one of only a few such road bridges in New Zealand) is several kilometres from State Highway 3 (just up from the town).

== New Zealand Wars ==
In December 1860 during the First Taranaki War campaign of the New Zealand Wars, British forces under Major-General Pratt carried out sapping operations against a major Māori defensive line called Te Arei ("The barrier") on the west side of the Waitara River, which was barring the way to the historic hill pā of Pukewairangi. During this operation, Colour Serjeant John Lucas was awarded the Victoria Cross on 18 March 1861.

== Water quality ==
Historically, water quality of the Waitara River was poor due to uncontrolled discharges of untreated Waitara town sewage and to industrial wastes from the meatworks. The river was observed to run red with discharges from the meatworks. The water quality improved significantly following the 1978 construction of an ocean outfall for sewage and following shutdown of the meatworks. Until 1999, sewage from Inglewood was discharged into the river.

In terms of e.coli levels, the Waitara River is listed as the second worst of 77 sites listed in the NIWA National River Water Quality Network, ranked as suitable for contact recreation, e.g. swimming.
