= 1977 National Provincial Championship =

The 1977 season was the second year of the National Provincial Championship (NPC), a provincial rugby union competition in New Zealand. Canterbury were the winners of Division 1, thus claiming the title of national champions.

== Division 1 ==
Relegated to Division Two

Pos	Team	Pld	W	D	L	PF	PA	PD	TF	Pts
1	Canterbury	10	10	0	0	190	81	+109	30	20
2	Counties	10	8	0	2	254	94	+160	42	16
3	Auckland	10	6	0	4	166	164	+2	20	12
4	Manawatu	10	6	0	4	152	95	+57	20	12
5	Hawke's Bay	10	5	0	5	160	174	−14	20	10
6	Taranaki	10	5	0	5	142	123	+19	14	10
7	Wellington	10	5	0	5	155	146	+9	25	10
8	Otago	10	4	0	6	149	171	−22	17	8
9	Southland	10	4	0	6	131	132	−1	13	8
10	Bay of Plenty	10	2	0	8	144	283	−139	18	4
11	Marlborough	10	0	0	10	90	270	−180	12	0

=== Results ===
May

25 May 1977

Marlborough	3–12	Canterbury
Pen: Ray Gordon (1/4)		Try: Scott Cartwright; Andy Jefferd; Alex Wyllie; Con: Richard Wilson (0/3); Pen: Richard Wilson (0/4)

Lansdowne Park, Blenheim
Referee: Graeme Harrison (Wellington)

28 May 1977

Wellington	15–12	Manawatu
Try: Warwick Procter; Paul Quinn; Con: Richard Cleland (2/2); Pen: Richard Cleland (1/1)		Try: Mark Donaldson; Brian Morris; Con: Kenneth Granger (2/2)

Athletic Park, Wellington

31 May 1977

Auckland	24–19	Hawke's Bay
Try: Mike Richards; Maurice Trapp; Con: Steve Watt (2/2); Pen: Steve Watt (4/4)		Try: Bruce Dunstan; Ken Taylor; Con: Hepa Paewai (1/2); Pen: Hepa Paewai (2/2); Drop: Hepa Paewai (1/1)

Eden Park, Auckland

June

6 June 1977

Marlborough	12–27	Wellington
Try: Lucky Macdonald; Con: Kevin Sutherland (1/1); Pen: Kevin Sutherland (2/2)		Try: Bernie Fraser (2); Ian May; Clive Currie; Con: Richard Cleland (4/4); Drop: John Dougan (1/1)

Lansdowne Park, Blenheim

14 June 1977

Taranaki	18–10	Wellington
Try: Ross Fraser; John O'Sullivan; Con: Stephen Davidson (2/2); Pen: Stephen Davidson (2/2)		Try: Andy Leslie; Con: Clive Currie (0/1); Pen: Clive Currie (2/2)

Hicks Park, Hāwera

25 June 1977

Counties	24–3	Hawke's Bay
Try: Patrick Yates; Alan Dawson; Mark Codlin; Andy Dalton; Con: Mark Codlin (1/3); Pen: Mark Codlin (2/2)		Pen: Murray Tocker (1/1)

Pukekohe Stadium, Pukekohe

July

2 July 1977

Canterbury	4–3	Manawatu
Try: John Ashworth; Con: Richard Wilson (0/1)		Pen: Doug Rollerson (1/1)

Lancaster Park, Christchurch

5 July 1977

Auckland	10–14	Counties
Try: Andy Haden; Con: Barry Riley (0/1); Pen: Barry Riley (1/1); Drop: Perry Parlane (1/1)		Try: Peter Goldsmith; Peter Clotworthy; Con: Mark Codlin (0/2); Pen: Mark Codlin (1/1); Buff Milner (1/1)

Eden Park, Auckland

16 July 1977

Manawatu	21–22	Auckland
Try: Paul Broederlow; Gary Knight; Con: Mike Banks (2/2); Pen: Mike Banks (3/3)		Try: Tim Twigden (2); Bryan Williams; Con: Steve Watt (2/2); Pen: Steve Watt (2/2)

Showgrounds Oval, Palmerston North

20 July 1977

Taranaki	37–4	Marlborough
Try: Stephen Davidson; Peter White; Peter Fleming; Graham Mourie; Ross Fraser; Con: Stephen Davidson (4/5); Pen: Stephen Davidson (3/3)		Try: Brian Ford; Con: Steve Marfell (0/1)

Rugby Park, New Plymouth

23 July 1977

Bay of Plenty	29–20	Marlborough
Try: Alan McNaughton; Peter Kingi; Eddie Stokes; Greg Rowlands; Tony Compton; Con: Greg Rowlands (3/5); Drop: John Brake (1/1)		Try: Brian Ford; Mark Best; Ross Rendel; Con: Steve Marfell (1/1); Pen: Steve Marfell (1/1); Drop: Brian Hunter (1/1)

Rugby Park, Rotorua

27 July 1977

Bay of Plenty	0–22	Manawatu
		Try: Kenneth Granger; Murray Watts; Mark Wright; Con: Mike Banks (2/3); Pen: Mike Banks (2/2)

Tauranga Domain, Tauranga

August

2 August 1977

Southland	22–7	Marlborough
Try: Steven Pokere; Sam Anderson; Con: Brian McKechnie (1/2); Pen: Brian McKechnie (3/3); Jeffrey Gardiner (1/1)		Try: Bill Stephenson; Con: Kevin Sutherland (0/1); Pen: Kevin Sutherland (1/1)

Rugby Park, Invercargill

6 August 1977

Hawke's Bay	25–17	Manawatu
Try: Ricky Allen; Hepa Paewai; Graham Wiig; Con: Richard Cox (2/2); Pen: Richard Cox (2/2); Drop: Richard Cox (1/1)		Try: Kenneth Granger; Murray Watts; George Hawkins; Con: Mike Banks (1/3); Pen: Mike Banks (1/1)

McLean Park, Napier

6 August 1977

Marlborough	7–51	Counties
Try: Mark Best; Con: Steve Marfell (0/1); Pen: Steve Marfell (1/1)		Try: Bob Lendrum (2); Richard Palmer (2); Bill Cummings; Buff Milner; Roy Craig; Bruce Robertson; Robert Kururangi; Con: John Hughes (4/7); Bob Lendrum (2/2); Pen: John Hughes (1/1)

Lansdowne Park, Blenheim

6 August 1977

Otago	4–13	Southland
Try: Simon Thompson; Con: Bevan Wilson (0/1)		Try: Steven Pokere; Evan Maclellan; Con: Brian McKechnie (1/2); Drop: Brian McKechnie (1/1)

Carisbrook, Dunedin

17 August 1977

Hawke's Bay	19–32	Canterbury
Try: Murray Smith; Tim Carter; Con: Richard Cox (1/2); Pen: Richard Cox (3/3)		Try: Murray McEwan (2); Randall Scott; Richard Wilson; Con: Richard Wilson (2/2); Pen: Richard Wilson (2/2); Drop: Doug Bruce (2/2)

Nelson Park, Hastings

18 August 1977

Marlborough	17–25	Otago
Try: Ian McAlpine; Steve Marfell; Con: Kevin Sutherland (0/2); Pen: Kevin Sutherland (2/2); Drop: Brian Hunter (1/1)		Try: Robert Roy; Simon Thompson; Bevan Wilson; Con: Bevan Wilson (2/3); Pen: Bevan Wilson (2/2)

Lansdowne Park, Blenheim

20 August 1977

Counties	4–9	Canterbury
Try: Alan Dawson; Con: Mark Codlin (0/1)		Pen: Richard Wilson (2/2); Drop: Richard Wilson (1/1)

Pukekohe Stadium, Pukekohe

20 August 1977

Taranaki	13–6	Hawke's Bay
Try: Peter White; Con: Stephen Davidson (0/1); Pen: Stephen Davidson (3/3)		Try: Murray Smith; Con: Murray Tocker (1/1)

Rugby Park, New Plymouth

20 August 1977

Wellington	17–13	Otago
Try: Paul Quinn (2); Warwick Procter; Con: Richard Cleland (1/3); Pen: Richard Cleland (1/1)		Try: Tim Burcher; Con: Bevan Wilson (0/1); Pen: Bevan Wilson (3/3)

Athletic Park, Wellington

20 August 1977

Southland	26–6	Bay of Plenty
Try: Brian McKechnie (2); Sam Anderson; Con: Brian McKechnie (1/3); Pen: Brian McKechnie (3/3); Drop: Brian McKechnie (1/1)		Pen: Greg Rowlands (2/2)

Rugby Park, Invercargill

24 August 1977

Otago	33–30	Bay of Plenty
Try: Simon Thompson; Graeme Elvin; Wayne Graham; Con: Bevan Wilson (0/3); Pen: Bevan Wilson (6/6); Drop: Lyn Jaffray (1/1)		Try: Graeme Moore; Mark Taylor; Mike Connor; Jim Helmbright; Con: John Brake (4/4); Pen: John Brake (1/1); Greg Rowlands (1/1)

Carisbrook, Dunedin

24 August 1977

Southland	6–13	Auckland
Pen: Brian McKechnie (2/2)		Try: Tua Saseve; Con: Steve Watt (0/1); Pen: Steve Watt (3/3)

Rugby Park, Invercargill

27 August 1977

Manawatu	15–10	Counties
Try: Jim Carroll; Con: Doug Rollerson (1/1); Pen: Mike Banks (2/2); Drop: Doug Rollerson (1/2)		Try: Peter Clotworthy; Con: Bob Lendrum (0/1); Pen: Bob Lendrum (2/2)

Showgrounds Oval, Palmerston North
Attendance: 15,000
Referee: Colin Gregan (Waikato)

27 August 1977

Wellington	6–10	Hawke's Bay
Try: Paul Quinn; Con: Richard Cleland (1/1)		Try: Murray Tocker; Con: Roger Whinham (0/1); Pen: Roger Whinham (2/2)

Athletic Park, Wellington

27 August 1977

Canterbury	30–12	Bay of Plenty
Try: Shane Gibbons (2); David Thompson; Graeme Higginson; John Phillips; Con: Richard Wilson (2/2); Pen: Richard Wilson (2/2)		Try: Graham Moore; Eddie Stokes; Con: Greg Rowlands (2/2)

Lancaster Park, Christchurch

27 August 1977

Otago	18–24	Auckland
Try: Peter McLeod; Con: Bevan Wilson (1/1); Pen: Bevan Wilson (4/4)		Try: Bryan Williams (2); Colin Farrell; Con: Steve Watt (1/1); Pen: Steve Watt (3/3); Drop: Mike Richards (1/1)

Carisbrook, Dunedin

31 August 1977

Southland	10–13	Canterbury
Try: Dave Shanks; Con: Brian McKechnie (0/1); Pen: Brian McKechnie (2/2)		Try: Shane Gibbons; Con: Richard Wilson (0/1); Pen: Richard Wilson (1/1); Drop: Doug Bruce (2/2)

Rugby Park, Invercargill

September

3 September 1977

Counties	36–3	Bay of Plenty
Try: Mark Codlin; Buff Milner; Robert Kururangi; Richard Palmer; Henk Habraken; Bob Lendrum; Con: Mark Codlin (3/6); Pen: Mark Codlin (3/3)		Pen: Greg Rowlands (1/1)

Pukekohe Stadium, Pukekohe

3 September 1977

Manawatu	21–7	Marlborough
Try: Kevin Maharey (2); John Callesen; Con: Doug Rollerson (0/3); Pen: Doug Rollerson (3/3)		Try: Brian Ford; Con: Brian Hunter (0/1); Drop: Brian Hunter (1/1)

Showgrounds Oval, Palmerston North
Attendance: 7,000
Referee: Peter McDavitt (Wellington)

3 September 1977

Wellington	11–3	Southland
Try: Brendan Gard'ner; Warwick Procter; Con: Brian Cederwall (0/2); Drop: John Dougan (1/1)		Pen: Brian McKechnie (1/1)

Athletic Park, Wellington

3 September 1977

Otago	9–14	Canterbury
Try: Tim Burcher; Con: Bevan Wilson (1/1); Pen: Bevan Wilson (1/1)		Try: Shane Gibbons; Randall Scott; Richard Wilson; Con: Richard Wilson (1/3)

Carisbrook, Dunedin

7 September 1977

Bay of Plenty	6–19	Taranaki
Pen: Greg Rowlands (2/2)		Try: Paul Martin; Wally Mahura; Con: Stephen Davidson (1/2); Pen: Stephen Davidson (3/3)

Rugby Park, Rotorua

7 September 1977

Manawatu	18–6	Southland
Try: Alan Innes; Kenneth Granger; John Loveday; Con: Doug Rollerson (0/3); Pen: Doug Rollerson (1/1); Drop: Doug Rollerson (1/1)		Pen: Brian McKechnie (1/1); Drop: Brian McKechnie (1/1)

Showgrounds Oval, Palmerston North
Attendance: 11,000
Referee: Keith Lawrence (Bay of Plenty)

10 September 1977

Taranaki	12–21	Counties
Pen: Stephen Davidson (4/4)		Try: Mark Codlin; Bob Lendrum; Con: Mark Codlin (2/2); Pen: Mark Codlin (2/2)

Rugby Park, New Plymouth

11 September 1977

Hawke's Bay	23–16	Southland
Try: Robbie Stuart (2); Pat Ryan; Con: Richard Cox (1/3); Pen: Richard Cox (3/3)		Try: Brian McKechnie; Con: Brian McKechnie (0/1); Pen: Brian McKechnie (2/2); Drop: Brian McKechnie (1/1); Graeme Anderson (1/1)

McLean Park, Napier

11 September 1977

Canterbury	17–0	Wellington
Try: Alex Wyllie; Murray McEwan; Terry Mitchell; Con: Richard Wilson (1/1); Drop: Richard Wilson (1/1)

Lancaster Park, Christchurch

14 September 1977

Counties	24–9	Southland
Try: Mike Sherbourne; Mac McCallion; Graeme Taylor; Henk Habraken; Con: Mark Codlin (1/4); Pen: Mark Codlin (1/1); Drop: Mark Codlin (1/1)		Try: Brian McKechnie; Con: Brian McKechnie (1/1); Pen: Brian McKechnie (1/1)

Pukekohe Stadium, Pukekohe

14 September 1977

Bay of Plenty	9–54	Auckland
Try: Eddie Stokes; Mark Taylor; Roger Dallison; Con: Greg Rowlands (3/3); Pen: Greg Rowlands (2/2)		Try: Greg Thaggard; Con: Steve Watt (1/1); Pen: Steve Watt (2/2)

Rugby Park, Rotorua

17 September 1977

Auckland	9–6	Wellington
Pen: Steve Watt (3/3)		Pen: Brian Cederwall (2/2)

Eden Park, Auckland

17 September 1977

Hawke's Bay	3–8	Otago
Pen: Richard Cox (1/1)		Try: Kenneth Mitchell (2); Con: Bevan Wilson (0/2)

McLean Park, Napier

17 September 1977

Manawatu	6–3	Taranaki
Try: Kevin Maharey; Con: Doug Rollerson (1/1)		Pen: Stephen Davidson (1/1)

Showgrounds Oval, Palmerston North
Attendance: 22,000
Referee: John Pring (Auckland)

21 September 1977

Counties	27–17	Otago
Try: John Spiers; Robert Kururangi; Richard Palmer; Bruce Robertson; Henk Habraken; Con: Mark Codlin (2/5); Pen: Mark Codlin (1/1)		Try: Barry Reeve; Ken Mitchell; Con: Bevan Wilson (0/2); Pen: Bevan Wilson (3/3)

Pukekohe Stadium, Pukekohe

21 September 1977

Canterbury	22–3	Taranaki
Try: Alex Wyllie; Mark Romans; Alwyn Harvey; Randall Scott; Con: Richard Wilson (3/4)		Pen: Stephen Davidson (1/1)

Lancaster Park, Christchurch

24 September 1977

Bay of Plenty	9–54	Wellington
Pen: Greg Rowlands (3/3)		Try: Warwick Procter (2); Paul Quinn (3); Stu Wilson (2); Brian Cederwall; Murray Mexted; Andy Leslie; Bernie Fraser; Con: Brian Cederwall (5/11)

Rugby Park, Rotorua

24 September 1977

Manawatu	17–3	Otago
Try: Hugh Blair; John Callesen; Con: Doug Rollerson (0/2); Pen: Doug Rollerson (2/2); Drop: Jim Carroll (1/1)		Pen: Bevan Wilson (1/1)

Showgrounds Oval, Palmerston North
Attendance: 15,000
Referee: Alan Taylor (Canterbury)

24 September 1977

Canterbury	37–18	Auckland
Try: Barry Thompson (2); Shane Gibbons; Lyn Davis; Murray McEwan; Scott Cartwright; Con: Richard Wilson (5/6); Pen: Richard Wilson (1/1)		Try: Bryan Williams; Colin Farrell; Terry Morrison; Bruce Gemmell; Con: Colin Farrell (1/4)

Lancaster Park, Christchurch

28 September 1977

Otago	19–9	Taranaki
Try: Merv Jaffray; Simon Thompson; Barry Reeve; Con: Bevan Wilson (2/3); Pen: Bevan Wilson (1/1)		Try: Tony Brown; Con: Stephen Davidson (1/1); Pen: Stephen Davidson (1/1)

Carisbrook, Dunedin

October

1 October 1977

Auckland	25–4	Marlborough
Try: Bryan Williams (2); Greg Thaggard; Andy Haden; Stu Conn; Con: Steve Watt (1/5); Pen: Steve Watt (1/1)		Try: Ross Rendel; Con: Steve Marfell (0/1)

Eden Park, Auckland

1 October 1977

Hawke's Bay	31–25	Bay of Plenty
Try: Murray Tocker; Pat Ryan; James Halbert; Robbie Stuart; Con: Richard Cox (3/4); Pen: Richard Cox (3/3)		Try: Eddie Stokes (2); Mike Connor; Roger Dallison; Con: Greg Rowlands (2/4); Pen: Greg Rowlands (1/1)

McLean Park, Napier

1 October 1977

Wellington	43–9	Counties
Try: Warwick Procter; Con: Brian Cederwall (1/1); Pen: Brian Cederwall (1/1)		Try: Robert Kururangi; Bruce Robertson; Alan Dawson; Richard Palmer; Graeme Taylor; Peter Williams; Con: Mark Codlin (3/5); Buff Milner (1/1); Pen: Bob Lendrum (1/1)

Athletic Park, Wellington

== Division 2 (North Island) ==
Pos	Team	Pld	W	D	L	PF	PA	PD	TF	Pts
1	North Auckland	8	8	0	0	238	32	+206	40	16
2	Waikato	8	6	0	2	203	70	+133	29	12
3	Poverty Bay	8	5	1	2	132	101	+31	17	11
4	Wanganui	8	5	1	2	160	134	+26	24	11
5	Wairarapa Bush	8	4	0	4	90	79	+11	10	8
6	King Country	8	3	0	5	75	149	−74	10	6
7	Thames Valley	8	2	1	5	99	158	−59	14	5
8	East Coast	8	1	1	6	74	203	−129	12	3
9	Horowhenua	8	0	0	8	48	193	−145	6	0

=== Results ===
May

7 May 1977

Horowhenua	11–17	King Country
Try: Mike Nutting; Midge O'Donnell; Con: Michael Brodie (0/1); Pen: Michael Brodie (1/1)		Try: Murray Kidd (2); Graham Tibby; Con: Sam Pye (1/3); Pen: Maraku Cribb (1/1)

Levin Domain, Levin

10 May 1977

Wairarapa Bush	13–9	King Country
Try: Neville Taylor; Con: Neil Kjestrup (0/1); Pen: Neil Kjestrup (2/2)		Try: Barry Donovan; Con: Maraku Cribb (1/1); Pen: Maraku Cribb (1/1)

Rugby Park, Pahiatua

21 May 1977

King Country	4–13	Wanganui
Try: Barry Donovan; Con: Maraku Cribb (0/1)		Try: Murdoch McKenzie; Con: Francis Hill (0/1); Pen: Francis Hill (3/3)

Taumarunui Domain, Taumarunui

June

6 June 1977

Poverty Bay	23–18	East Coast
Try: Kevin Gaukrodger; Jody Walters; Charlie Keelan; Con: Willie Nikora (1/3); Pen: Willie Nikora (3/3)		Try: Boydie Donald; Ray Falcon; Marty Charteris; Con: Terry Roberts (3/3)

Rugby Park, Gisborne

25 June 1977

King Country	10–6	Thames Valley
Try: Murray Kidd; Con: James Poutu (0/1); Pen: James Poutu (1/1); John Wereta (1/1)		Pen: Graham Bax (2/2)

Island Reserve, Ōtorohanga

25 June 1977

Horowhenua	7–28	Wanganui
Try: Robbie Puklowski; Con: Maihi Marino (0/1); Pen: Maihi Marino (1/1)		Try: Murdoch McKenzie; Larry Graham; Trevor Olney; Rob Manson; Con: Peter Te Huna (2/3); Murdoch McKenzie (1/1); Pen: Peter Te Huna (1/1); Murdoch McKenzie (1/1)

Levin Domain, Levin

July

2 July 1977

North Auckland	42–0	Thames Valley
Try: Eddie Dunn; Joe Pilcher; Phil Halse; Charles Going; Peter Sloane; Joe Morgan; David Haynes; Con: Arnold Morgan (4/7); Pen: Arnold Morgan (2/2)

Okara Park, Whangārei

14 July 1977

Poverty Bay	23–4	Horowhenua
Try: Graeme Torrie (2); Brett Sherriff; Con: Wayne Muir (1/3); Pen: Wayne Muir (2/2); Graeme Torrie (1/1)		Try: Jock Free; Con: Keith McCreedy (0/1)

Rugby Park, Gisborne

16 July 1977

East Coast	16–15	Horowhenua
Try: Wilson Walker (2); Wayne Truman; Con: Lance Rickard (2/3)		Pen: Keith McCreedy (5/5)

Whakarua Park, Ruatoria

16 July 1977

Poverty Bay	21–3	King Country
Try: Lawrie Knight (2); Graeme Torrie; Paul Tocker; Con: Willie Nikora (1/4); Pen: Willie Nikora (1/1)		Con: John Lang (1/1)

Rugby Park, Gisborne

19 July 1977

Thames Valley	16–4	Horowhenua
Try: Graham Bax (2); Don McMillan; Con: Colin Barlow (2/3)		Try: Paul Lucas Martin; Con: Keith McCreedy (0/1)

Rugby Park, Waihi

19 July 1977

East Coast	10–17	King Country
Try: Wilson Walker; Con: Terry Roberts (0/1); Pen: Terry Roberts (2/2)		Try: Murray Kidd (2); Don Milham; Con: John Lang (1/3); Pen: John Lang (1/1)

Whakarua Park, Ruatoria

31 July 1977

Wanganui	16–6	Wairarapa Bush
Try: Trevor Olney; Bob Barrell; Con: Bob Barrell (1/2); Pen: Bob Barrell (2/2)		Try: Hona Huriwai; Con: Neil Kjestrup (1/1)

Cooks Gardens, Wanganui

August

6 August 1977

East Coast	0–28	Wairarapa Bush
		Try: Ritchie Robertson; Jimmy Cotter; Bruce Patrick; Con: Neil Kjestrup (2/3); Pen: Neil Kjestrup (3/3); Drop: Jimmy Cotter (1/1)

Whakarua Park, Ruatoria

9 August 1977

Thames Valley	22–12	Wairarapa Bush
Try: Brian Duggan; Chris Ellis; Don McMillan; Con: Colin Barlow (2/3); Pen: Colin Barlow (2/2)		Try: Ritchie Robertson; Con: Tony Brown (1/1); Pen: Tony Brown (2/2)

Paeroa Domain, Paeroa

11 August 1977

Waikato	28–9	East Coast
Try: Thomas Hiriaki (3); Trevor Irwin; John O'Rourke; Con: Trevor Irwin (1/5); Pen: Trevor Irwin (2/2)		Try: Chris Waru; Con: Terry Roberts (1/1); Pen: Terry Roberts (1/1)

Rugby Park, Hamilton

14 August 1977

North Auckland	51–7	East Coast
Try: David Haynes (2); Alan Martin (2); Lloyd Roberts (2); Steve Griffin; Phil Halse; Eddie Dunn; Mike Gunson; Con: Eddie Dunn (3/9); Mike Gunson (1/1); Pen: Mike Gunson (1/1)		Try: John Maddever; Con: Terry Roberts (0/1); Pen: Terry Roberts (1/1)

Okara Park, Whangārei

20 August 1977

Poverty Bay	20–11	Wairarapa Bush
Try: Kevin Gaukrodger; Paul Tocker; Con: Wayne Muir (0/2); Pen: Wayne Muir (4/4)		Try: Bill Rowlands; Dallas Spowart; Con: Jimmy Cotter (0/2); Pen: Jimmy Cotter (1/1)

Rugby Park, Gisborne

20 August 1977

Waikato	59–12	King Country
Try: John O'Rourke (4); Paul Anderson (2); Dick Myers; Matt Deane; Con: Trevor Irwin (6/8); Pen: Trevor Irwin (5/5)		Try: Laurie Sands; Con: John Lang (1/1); Pen: John Lang (2/2)

Rugby Park, Hamilton

20 August 1977

East Coast	10–10	Thames Valley
Try: Boydie Donald; Peter McGrannachan; Con: Terry Roberts (1/2)		Try: Tony Jackson; Con: Colin Barlow (0/1); Pen: Colin Barlow (2/2)

Whakarua Park, Ruatoria

27 August 1977

Thames Valley	9–19	Waikato
Try: Reg Hennessy; Con: Allen Fisher (1/1); Pen: Allen Fisher (1/1)		Try: Miah Melsom; Matt Deane; Con: Trevor Irwin (2/2); Drop: Ross McGlashan (1/1)

Boyd Park, Te Aroha

27 August 1977

Wanganui	15–15	Poverty Bay
Try: Bruce Middleton; Rob Manson; Con: Murdoch McKenzie (2/2); Pen: Peter Te Huna (1/1)		Pen: Laurie Holmes (4/4); Drop: Graeme Thompson (1/1)

Cooks Gardens, Wanganui

27 August 1977

Wairarapa Bush	6–0	Horowhenua
Pen: Neil Kjestrup (2/2)

Memorial Park, Masterton

31 August 1977

North Auckland	52–6	Wanganui
Try: Sid Going (2); Joe Pilcher (2); Maihi Mahanga (2); Charles Going; Toni Waaka; Harley Sowman; David Haynes; Wuzz Phillips; Con: Mike Gunson (4/11)		Pen: Murdoch McKenzie (2/2)

Central Ground, Kaikohe

September

3 September 1977

Waikato	21–11	Wanganui
Try: John O'Rourke; Paul Anderson; Con: Trevor Irwin (2/2); Pen: Trevor Irwin (2/2); Drop: Ross McGlashan (1/1)		Try: Larry Graham; Ray Stafford; Con: Murdoch McKenzie (0/2); Pen: Murdoch McKenzie (1/1)

Rugby Park, Hamilton

3 September 1977

Horowhenua	0–36	North Auckland
		Try: Sid Going; Mike Gunson; John Belton; Toni Waaka; Eddie Dunn; Darcy Ruddell; Con: Mike Gunson (3/6); Pen: Mike Gunson (2/2)

Levin Domain, Levin

6 September 1977

Wairarapa Bush	7–9	North Auckland
Try: Hona Huriwai; Con: Neil Kjestrup (0/1); Pen: Neil Kjestrup (1/1)		Try: Charles Going; Con: Mike Gunson (1/1); Pen: Mike Gunson (1/1)

Memorial Park, Masterton

8 September 1977

Horowhenua	7–51	Waikato
Try: Danny Ryland; Con: Keith McCreedy (0/1); Pen: Keith McCreedy (1/1)		Try: Matt Deane (2); Brian Morrissey (2); Trevor Irwin; Ron Lockwood; Kit Fawcett; Norm Morrow; Miah Melsom; Thomas Hiriaki; Con: Trevor Irwin (3/9); Kit Fawcett (1/1); Pen: Trevor Irwin (1/1)

Levin Domain, Levin

10 September 1977

King Country	3–16	North Auckland
Pen: Sam Pye (1/1)		Try: Mike Gunson; John Belton; Con: John Belton (1/2); Pen: John Belton (1/1)

Turangitukua Park, Tūrangi

10 September 1977

Thames Valley	11–21	Poverty Bay
Try: Tuk Sheehan; Greg Harris; Con: Graham Bax (0/2); Pen: Graham Bax (1/1)		Try: Jody Walters; Leslie Barbara; Graham Barbara; Con: Laurie Holmes (1/3); Pen: Laurie Holmes (1/1)

Boyd Park, Te Aroha

10 September 1977

Wanganui	31–4	East Coast
Try: Murdoch McKenzie (2); Nig Paki Paki; Richard Murray; Rob Manson; Ray Stafford; Con: Murdoch McKenzie (2/6); Drop: Bill Osborne (1/1)		Try: Tom Wilson; Con: Terry Roberts (0/1)

Cooks Gardens, Wanganui

10 September 1977

Wairarapa Bush	7–3	Waikato
Try: John Tuckerman; Con: Neil Kjestrup (0/1); Pen: Ian Barry Blake (1/1)		Drop: Kit Fawcett (1/1)

Memorial Park, Masterton

17 September 1977

Waikato	16–6	Poverty Bay
Try: Trevor Irwin; Kevin Greene; Con: Trevor Irwin (1/2); Pen: Trevor Irwin (1/1); Drop: Ross McGlashan (1/1)		Try: Ian Kirkpatrick; Con: Laurie Holmes (1/1)

Rugby Park, Hamilton

10 September 1977

Wanganui	40–25	Thames Valley
Try: Richard Murray (3); Bill Osborne (2); Rob Manson; Kerry O'Hara; Con: Bob Barrell (2/6); Murdoch McKenzie (1/1); Pen: Bob Barrell (2/2)		Try: Don McMillan (2); Brian Duggan; Reg Hennessy; Con: Graham Bax (3/4); Pen: Graham Bax (1/1)

Cooks Gardens, Wanganui

21 September 1977

North Auckland	23–3	Poverty Bay
Try: Charles Going (2); Toni Waaka; Con: Mike Gunson (2/2); John Belton (1/1)		Pen: Laurie Holmes (1/1)

Okara Park, Whangārei

24 September 1977

North Auckland	9–6	Waikato
Pen: Mike Gunson (2/2); Drop: Eddie Dunn (1/1)		Pen: Trevor Irwin (2/2)

Okara Park, Whangārei

== Division 2 (South Island) ==
Pos	Team	Pld	W	D	L	PF	PA	PD	TF	Pts
1	South Canterbury	5	5	0	0	111	21	+90	17	10
2	Mid Canterbury	5	4	0	1	87	36	+51	15	8
3	Nelson Bays	5	3	0	2	56	63	−7	6	6
4	West Coast	5	2	0	3	65	81	−16	9	4
5	North Otago	5	1	0	4	43	99	−56	5	2
6	Buller	5	0	0	5	18	80	−62	2	0

=== Results ===
June

6 June 1977

South Canterbury	17–4	Mid Canterbury
Try: Ian Palmer (2); Neville Richards; Con: Doug Nicol (1/3); Pen: Doug Nicol (1/1)		Try: Paul Williams

Fraser Park, Timaru

6 June 1977

Nelson Bays	10–3	Buller
Try: Stewart Robertson; Con: Jim Speedy (0/1); Pen: Jim Speedy (2/2)		Pen: Rex Mumm (1/1)

Trafalgar Park, Nelson

11 June 1977

Buller	3–12	West Coast
Pen: Alan Ireland (1/1)		Try: Peter Teen; Con: Gavin Cook (1/1); Pen: Gavin Cook (1/1); Kelvin McBride (1/1)

Victoria Square, Westport

July

23 July 1977

Mid Canterbury	20–0	Buller
Try: Geoff Bryant; John Greenslade; Alan Grieve; Alan Edge; Con: Murray Straight (2/4)

Ashburton Showgrounds, Ashburton

26 July 1977

South Canterbury	26–6	Buller
Try: Ian Palmer (3); Doug Nicol; Tony Goddard; Barry Gallagher; Con: Doug Nicol (1/6)		Try: Piet Groot; Con: Rex Mumm (1/1)

Fraser Park, Timaru

August

6 August 1977

West Coast	4–11	Nelson Bays
Try: Ken Beams		Try: Stewart Robertson (2); Con: Jim Speedy (0/2); Pen: Jim Speedy (1/1)

Rugby Park, Greymouth

6 August 1977

Buller	6–12	North Otago
Try: Rex Mumm; Con: Rex Mumm (1/1)		Try: Gary Fairbanks; Con: Barry Simpson (1/1); Pen: Barry Simpson (2/2)

Victoria Square, Westport

9 August 1977

West Coast	35–13	North Otago
Try: Peter Teen (3); Bruce Davidson; Ken Beams; Con: Stephen Boon (3/5); Pen: Stephen Boon (2/2); Drop: Stephen Boon (1/1)		Try: Gary Fairbanks; Phil Winter; Con: Barry Simpson (1/2); Pen: Barry Simpson (1/1)

Rugby Park, Greymouth

25 August 1977

North Otago	15–22	Nelson Bays
Try: Graham Johnston (2); Con: Barry Simpson (2/2); Pen: Barry Simpson (1/1)		Try: Stewart Robertson; Graham Rogers; Con: Jim Speedy (1/2); Pen: Jim Speedy (4/4)

Centennial Park, Oamaru

27 August 1977

South Canterbury	12–0	Nelson Bays
Pen: Doug Nicol (2/2); Drop: Doug Nicol (1/1); Tony Goddard (1/1)

Fraser Park, Timaru

30 August 1977

Mid Canterbury	29–13	Nelson Bays
Try: Geoff Bryant (5); Con: Ian McLenaghen (0/5); Pen: Ian McLenaghen (1/1); Drop: Murray Roulston (1/1)		Try: Colin Haigh; Con: Jim Speedy (0/1); Pen: Jim Speedy (2/8); Drop: Jim Speedy (1/1)

Ashburton Showgrounds, Ashburton

September

3 September 1977

North Otago	3–27	South Canterbury
Pen: Barry Simpson (1/1)		Try: Ian Palmer; Doug Nicol; Bill Anderson; Robin Heron; Con: Doug Nicol (1/4); Pen: Doug Nicol (3/3)

Centennial Park, Oamaru

3 September 1977

Mid Canterbury	25–6	West Coast
Try: Geoff Bryant (3); Alan Grieve (2); Con: Ian McLenaghen (1/5); Pen: Ian McLenaghen (1/1)		Pen: David Curtain (2/2)

Ashburton Showgrounds, Ashburton

17 September 1977

West Coast	8–29	South Canterbury
Try: Ken Beams; Con: Russell Johns (1/1)		Try: Neville Richards; Robin Heron; Peter Walsh; Doug Nicol; Con: Doug Nicol (2/4); Pen: Doug Nicol (3/3)

Rugby Park, Greymouth

17 September 1977

North Otago	0–9	Mid Canterbury
		Pen: Jock Ross (1/1); Drop: Murray Roulston (2/2)

Centennial Park, Oamaru

== Promotion/Relegation ==
Bay of Plenty and Marlborough finished in the bottom two of Division 1.

The winners of Division 2 North, North Auckland, were automatically promoted to Division 1; Bay of Plenty were relegated, just one season after they won the National Championship.

The winners of Division 2 South, South Canterbury, played Marlborough and won 13–9 to earn promotion to Division 1; Marlborough were relegated to Division 2.
