= 1976 National Provincial Championship =

The 1976 season was the inaugural year of the National Provincial Championship (NPC), also known for sponsorship reasons as the Radio New Zealand National Championship, a provincial rugby union competition in New Zealand. Bay of Plenty were the winners of Division 1, while Taranaki and South Canterbury were the winners of Division 2 North Island and Division 2 South Island respectively.

== Division 1 ==
=== Standings ===
Pos	Team	Pld	W	D	L	PF	PA	PD	TF	Pts
1	Bay of Plenty	10	8	1	1	195	112	+83	25	17
2	Manawatu (RS)	10	7	1	2	142	104	+38	17	15
3	Auckland	10	6	1	3	160	133	+27	19	13
4	Canterbury	10	6	0	4	153	118	+35	20	12
5	Counties	10	6	0	4	118	107	+11	20	12
6	Wellington	10	5	1	4	165	122	+43	20	11
7	Otago	10	4	2	4	106	148	+42	11	10
8	Hawke's Bay	10	4	0	6	125	130	−5	18	8
9	Marlborough	10	3	0	7	146	192	−46	19	6
10	Southland	10	2	1	7	105	161	−56	13	5
11	North Auckland	10	0	1	9	76	164	−88	8	1

=== Results ===
==== May ====
12 May 1976

Hawke's Bay	7–10	Auckland
Try: Robbie Stuart; Pen: Roger Whinham		Try: Tua Mose Saseve; Pen: Steve Watt; Drop: Mark Sisam

McLean Park, Napier
Referee: Bill Adlam (Wanganui)

19 May 1976

Canterbury	23–9	Marlborough
Try: Scott Cartwright; Terry Mitchell; Murray McEwan; John Phillips; Con: Doug Heffernan (2); Pen: Doug Heffernan		Pen: Steve Marfell (3)

Lancaster Park, Christchurch
Referee: Dave Millar (Otago)

==== June ====
7 June 1976

Manawatu	23–13	Wellington
Try: Doug Rollerson (2); Kenneth Granger; Con: Doug Rollerson; Pen: Doug Rollerson (2)		Try: Geoff Skipper; Con: Clive Currie (2); Pen: Brian Cederwall

Showgrounds Oval, Palmerston North
Referee: Colin Patrick Gregan (Waikato)

16 June 1976

Counties	12–19	Auckland
Try: John Hughes; Andy Dalton; Patrick Yates		Try: Terry Morrison (2); Con: Steve Watt; Pen: Steve Watt (2); Drop: Perry Parlane

The Stadium, Pukekohe
Referee: Ian James Clarke (Waikato)

26 June 1976

North Auckland	3–12	Auckland
Pen: Chippy Semenoff		Try: Dave Palmer; Con: Steve Watt; Pen: Steve Watt; Drop: Joe Whiu

Okara Park, Whangārei
Referee: Kevin Hugh Lynch (Poverty Bay)

26 June 1976

Counties	4–15	Wellington
Try: Patrick Yates		Try: Grant Griffith; Con: Clive Currie; Pen: Clive Currie (3)

The Stadium, Pukekohe
Referee: Mike Farnworth (Auckland)

==== July ====
3 July 1976

Bay of Plenty	9–10	Counties
Pen: Tuck Waaka (2); Drop: John Brake		Try: Richard Palmer; Henk Habraken; Con: Graeme Taylor

The Stadium, Rotorua
Referee: D. Cooper (Poverty Bay)

8 July 1976

Manawatu	19–6	North Auckland
Try: Murray Watts; Mark Donaldson; Grant Bowater; Con: Doug Rollerson (2); Drop: Doug Rollerson		Pen: Brian McCarroll (2)

Showgrounds Oval, Palmerston North
Referee: Brian Walter Duffy (Taranaki)

10 July 1976

Wellington	13–0	North Auckland
Try: Stu Wilson; Kevin Phelan; Con: Clive Currie; Pen: Clive Currie

Athletic Park, Wellington
Referee: Barry Williams (West Coast)

13 July 1976

Marlborough	24–17	North Auckland
Try: Dave Neal (2); Brian Dwyer; Con: Kevin Sutherland (3); Pen: Kevin Sutherland; Drop: Ray Gordon		Try: Phil Halse (2); David Haynes; Con: Brian McCarroll; Pen: Brian McCarroll

Lansdowne Park, Blenheim
Referee: Norm Thomas (Manawatu)

17 July 1976

Southland	9–23	Manawatu
Try: Ron Davis; Con: Geoff Valli; Pen: Geoff Valli		Try: Paul Broederlow; Ken Maharey; Mark Wright; Doug Rollerson; Con: Doug Rollerson (2); Drop: Doug Rollerson

Rugby Park, Invercargill
Referee: Lester Te Au (South Canterbury)

20 July 1976

Otago	0–0	Manawatu

Carisbrook Ground, Dunedin
Referee: John Gordon Macdonald(North Otago)

20 July 1976

Marlborough	15–25	Auckland
Try: Dave Neal; Mark Best; Con: Kevin Sutherland (2); Pen: Kevin Sutherland		Try: Terry Morrison; Joe Whiu; Barry Ashworth; Glenn Rich; Con: Steve Watt (3); Pen: Steve Watt

Lansdowne Park, Blenheim
Referee: Allan Creighton (Otago)

24 July 1976

Hawke's Bay	33–10	Marlborough
Try: Robbie Hunter (3); Ian Grant; Roger Bremmer; Con: Richard Cox (2); Pen: Richard Cox (3)		Try: Mark Best; Pen: Kevin Sutherland; Drop: Ray Gordon

Nelson Park, Hastings
Referee: D. R. Buckland (Wellington)

27 July 1976

Counties	10–6	Marlborough
Try: Richard Palmer; Pen: Bob Lendrum; Drop: Bob Lendrum		Try: Steve Marfell; Con: Kevin Sutherland

The Stadium, Pukekohe
Referee: Bob Francis (Wairarapa Bush)

31 July 1976

Marlborough	13–24	Bay of Plenty
Try: Philip Neal; Pen: Kevin Sutherland (3)		Try: Eddie Stokes (2); Barry Spry; Allan McNaughton; Graham Moore; Con: Greg Rowlands

Lansdowne Park, Blenheim
Referee: Nelson Burton Whittaker (Manawatu)

==== August ====
4 August 1976

Wellington	18–18	Bay of Plenty
Try: Geoff Skipper; Con: Brian Cederwall; Pen: Brian Cederwall (4)		Pen: Greg Rowlands (4); Tuck Waaka; Drop: Greg Rowlands

Athletic Park, Wellington
Referee: Mike Farnworth (Auckland)

7 August 1976

Manawatu	9–28	Bay of Plenty
Pen: Doug Rollerson (2); Sheridan Martin Murphy		Try: Eddie Stokes; Mark Taylor; Jimmy Kamizona; Lawrence Keepa; Con: Greg Rowlands (3); Pen: Greg Rowlands (2)

Showgrounds Oval, Palmerston North
Referee: Bob Watson (North Auckland)

7 August 1976

Southland	9–10	Otago
Pen: Geoff Valli (2); Drop: John Polson		Try: Kenneth Mitchell; Pen: Bevan Wilson; Drop: Bevin Guthrie

Rugby Park, Invercargill
Referee: Tom Doocey (Canterbury)

11 August 1976

Otago	6–18	Hawke's Bay
Pen: Bevan Wilson (2)		Try: Tim Carter; Pat Ryan; Jock McCarroll; Con: Richard Cox (3)

Carisbrook Ground, Dunedin
Referee: Barry Williams (West Coast)

11 August 1976

Manawatu	15–10	Canterbury
Try: Paul Broederlow; Con: Doug Rollerson; Pen: Doug Rollerson (2); Drop: Brian Morris		Try: Vance Stewart; Doug Heffernan; Con: Doug Heffernan

Showgrounds Oval, Palmerston North
Referee: Bill Adlam (Wanganui)

14 August 1976

Southland	6–7	Hawke's Bay
Pen: Geoff Valli (2)		Try: Robbie Stuart; Pen: Richard Cox

Rugby Park, Invercargill
Referee: Jeff Walker (Otago)

14 August 1976

North Auckland	13–21	Canterbury
Try: Mike Gunson; Pen: Brian McCarroll (2); David Laurie		Try: Scott Cartwright (2); John Phillips; Andy Jefferd; Con: Doug Heffernan; Pen: Doug Heffernan

Okara Park, Whangārei
Referee: Jim Innes (Counties)

17 August 1976

Bay of Plenty	12–6	Canterbury
Try: Graham Moore; Con: Greg Rowlands; Pen: Greg Rowlands; Drop: John Brake		Pen: Richard Wilson (2)

The Domain, Tauranga
Referee: Kevin Hugh Lynch (Poverty Bay)

18 August 1976

Auckland (RS)	9–9	Southland
Pen: Steve Watt (3)		Try: Dave Saunders; Con: Geoff Valli; Pen: Geoff Valli

Eden Park, Auckland
Referee: Brian Walter Duffy (Taranaki)

21 August 1976

Auckland (RS)	10–12	Manawatu
Try: Andy Haden; Terry Morrison; Con: Steve Watt		Try: Doug Rollerson; Con: Duncan Hales; Pen: Doug Rollerson; Drop: Doug Rollerson

Eden Park, Auckland
Referee: Colin Patrick Gregan (Waikato)

21 August 1976

Canterbury	13–6	Hawke's Bay
Try: Alex Wyllie; Scott Cartwright; Con: Doug Heffernan; Pen: Doug Heffernan		Pen: Richard Cox (2)

Lancaster Park, Christchurch
Referee: Graeme Harrison (Wellington)

21 August 1976

Bay of Plenty	27–12	Southland
Try: Eddie Stokes (2); Peter Horrocks; Tony Brown; Graham Moore; Con: Greg Rowlands; Tuck Waaka; Pen: Greg Rowlands		Try: Leicester Rutledge; Con: Geoff Valli; Pen: Geoff Valli (2)

The Domain, Whakatāne
Referee: John Pring (Auckland)

24 August 1976

Counties	12–14	Manawatu
Try: Patrick Yates (2); Con: Mark Codlin (2)		Try: Kenneth Granger; Doug Rollerson; Murray Watts; Con: Duncan Hales

The Stadium, Pukekohe
Referee: L. Paul (Counties)

24 August 1976

North Auckland	9–15	Southland
Try: Murray Dyer; Con: Brian McCarroll; Pen: Brian McCarroll		Try: Leicester Rutledge; Ash McGregor; Con: Geoff Valli (2); Pen: Geoff Valli

Okara Park, Whangārei
Referee: Keith Harold Lawrence (Bay of Plenty)

28 August 1976

Auckland	28–31	Bay of Plenty
Try: Terry Morrison; Denis Thorn; Glenn Rich; Con: Steve Watt (2); Pen: Steve Watt (3); Drop: Mike Richards		Try: Tony Brown; Mark Taylor; Graham Moore; Con: Greg Rowlands (2); Pen: Greg Rowlands (4); Drop: John Brake

Eden Park, Auckland
Referee: Dave Millar (Otago)

28 August 1976

Hawke's Bay	25–16	North Auckland
Try: Jock McCarroll (2); Peter Durham (2); Robbie Hunter; Con: Richard Cox; Pen: Richard Cox		Try: Harley Sowman; David Haynes; Mike Gunson; Con: Brian McCarroll (2)

McLean Park, Napier
Referee: Alan Bailey (Wellington)

28 August 1976

Otago	16–6	Counties
Try: Tim Burcher; Pen: Bevan Wilson (3); Drop: Bevan Wilson		Pen: Mark Codlin (2)

Carisbrook Ground, Dunedin
Referee: Alan Ralph Taylor (Canterbury)

28 August 1976

Wellington	14–15	Canterbury
Try: Stu Wilson (2); Pen: Richard Cleland (2)		Try: Paul Macfie; Don Stewart; Con: Doug Heffernan (2); Pen: Doug Heffernan

Athletic Park, Wellington
Referee: Bill Adlam (Wanganui)

==== September ====
1 September 1976

Southland	10–19	Counties
Try: Murray Arthur Mitchell; Geoff Valli; Con: Geoff Valli		Try: Bob Lendrum; Peter Clotworthy; Joe Rawiri; Con: Bob Lendrum (2); Pen: Bob Lendrum

Rugby Park, Invercargill
Referee: S. C. Miller (South Canterbury)

4 September 1976

Auckland	16–26	Otago
Try: Lin Colling; Glenn Rich; Con: Steve Watt; Pen: Steve Watt (2)		Try: Lindsay Clark; Merv Jaffray; Alistair Barton; Bevan Wilson; Con: Bevan Wilson (2); Pen: Bevan Wilson (2)

Eden Park, Auckland
Referee: Peter Alan McDavitt (Wellington)

4 September 1976

Hawke's Bay	13–25	Wellington
Try: Junior Paraha; Peter Durham; Con: Richard Cox; Pen: Richard Cox		Try: Warwick Procter (2); Stu Wilson (2); Con: Richard Cleland (3); Pen: Richard Cleland

Nelson Park, Hastings
Referee: Kevin Hugh Lynch (Poverty Bay)

4 September 1976

Canterbury	6–11	Counties
Pen: Doug Heffernan (2)		Try: Patrick Yates (2); Drop: Bob Lendrum

Lancaster Park, Christchurch
Referee: Barry McKay Dawson (Southland)

4 September 1976

Marlborough	28–12	Southland
Try: Brian Ford; Ray Gordon; John Davie; Dave Neal; Con: Kevin Sutherland (3); Pen: Kevin Sutherland; Drop: Kerry Ross Hodges		Try: Leicester Rutledge (2); Con: Geoff Valli (2)

Lansdowne Park, Blenheim
Referee: John Gordon Macdonald (North Otago)

4 September 1976

North Auckland	3–17	Bay of Plenty
Pen: David Laurie		Try: Graham Moore; Mark Taylor; Greg Rowlands; Con: Greg Rowlands; Pen: Greg Rowlands

Okara Park, Whangārei
Referee: Colin Patrick Gregan (Waikato)

8 September 1976

North Auckland	3–3	Otago
Pen: David Laurie		Pen: Bevan Wilson

Okara Park, Whangārei
Referee: Bob Watson (North Auckland)

12 September 1976

Canterbury	16–7	Southland
Try: Geoff Brain; Pen: Doug Heffernan (4)		Try: Ron Davis; Drop: Brian McKechnie

Lancaster Park, Christchurch
Referee: Dave Millar (Otago)

12 September 1976

Manawatu (RS)	15–3	Hawke's Bay
Try: Murray Watts; Alan Campbell Innes; Con: Doug Rollerson (2); Pen: Doug Rollerson		Pen: Richard Cox

Showgrounds Oval, Palmerston North
Referee: John Pring (Auckland)

12 September 1976

Wellington	9–12	Auckland
Try: Geoff Skipper; Con: Richard Cleland; Pen: Richard Cleland		Try: Terry Morrison; Andy Haden; Con: Steve Watt (2)

Athletic Park, Wellington
Referee: Norm Thomas (Manawatu)

13 September 1976

Bay of Plenty	19–6	Otago
Try: Jimmy Kamizona; Peter Horrocks; John Brake; Con: Greg Rowlands (2); Pen: Greg Rowlands		Pen: Bevan Wilson (2)

The Stadium, Rotorua
Referee: Bill Adlam (Wanganui)

15 September 1976

Counties	15–6	North Auckland
Try: Ean McRobbie; Bob Lendrum; Con: Mark Codlin (2); Pen: Mark Codlin		Pen: Ross McAllister (2)

The Stadium, Pukekohe
Referee: Brian Walter Duffy (Taranaki)

16 September 1976

Southland	16–13	Wellington
Try: John Wayne Ellis; Roger Ramsey; Dave Saunders; Con: Geoff Valli (2)		Try: Geoff Skipper; Warwick Procter; Con: Richard Cleland; Pen: Clive Currie

Rugby Park, Invercargill
Referee: Barry Williams (West Coast)

18 September 1976

Auckland	19–9	Canterbury
Try: Denis Thorn; Jon McLachlan; Con: Steve Watt; Pen: Steve Watt (3)		Pen: Doug Heffernan (3)

Eden Park, Auckland
Referee: Nelson Burton Whittaker (Manawatu)

18 September 1976

Otago	7–29	Wellington
Try: John Colling; Pen: Bevan Wilson		Try: Ian Stevens (2); Paul Quinn; Stu Wilson; Con: Clive Currie (2); Pen: Clive Currie (2); Drop: John Dougan

Carisbrook Ground, Dunedin
Referee: Lester Te Au (South Canterbury)

18 September 1976

Marlborough	13–12	Manawatu
Try: John Davie; Brian Ford; Con: Kevin Sutherland; Pen: Kevin Sutherland		Pen: Doug Rollerson (3); Drop: Brent Wright

Lansdowne Park, Blenheim
Referee: G. L. Harrison (Wellington)

18 September 1976

Bay of Plenty	10–7	Hawke's Bay
Try: Greg Rowlands; Pen: Greg Rowlands (2)		Try: Jock McCarroll; Pen: Richard Cox

The Stadium Rotorua
Referee: Jim Innes (Counties)

22 September 1976

Otago	20–14	Marlborough
Try: Tim Burcher; Alistair Barton; Merv Jaffray; Con: Bevan Wilson; Pen: Bevan Wilson; Drop: Bevan Wilson		Try: Brian Ford; Bruce Kenny; Pen: Kevin Sutherland (2)

Carisbrook Ground, Dunedin
Referee: Barry McKay Dawson (Southland)

25 September 1976

Canterbury	34–12	Otago
Try: Donald James Stewart (2); John Munro; Andy Jefferd; John Ashworth; Con: Doug Heffernan (4); Pen: Doug Heffernan; Drop: Terry Mehrtens		Try: Rob Roy; Con: Bevan Wilson; Pen: Bevan Wilson (2)

Lancaster Park, Christchurch
Referee: Alan Bailey (Wellington)

25 September 1976

Wellington	16–14	Marlborough
Try: Stu Wilson; Warwick Procter; Con: Clive Currie; Pen: Clive Currie (2)		Try: Alan Sutherland (3); Con: Kevin Sutherland

Athletic Park, Wellington
Referee: Bob Francis (Wairarapa Bush)

25 September 1976

Hawke's Bay	6–19	Counties
Pen: Roger Whinham (2)		Try: Buff Milner (2); Patrick Yates; Owen Trevor Burnside; Drop: Bob Lendrum

McLean Park, Napier
Referee: Peter Alan McDavitt (Wellington)

== Division 2 (North Island) ==
=== Standings ===
Pos	Team	Pld	W	D	L	PF	PA	PD	TF	Pts
1	Taranaki	8	8	0	0	209	49	+160	28	16
2	Wanganui	8	7	0	1	216	87	+129	31	14
3	King Country	8	4	1	3	110	144	−34	9	9
4	Poverty Bay	8	4	0	4	92	115	−23	11	8
5	Waikato	8	4	0	4	173	76	+97	28	8
6	Wairarapa Bush	8	4	0	4	98	107	−9	13	8
7	East Coast	8	2	0	6	41	214	−173	6	4
8	Thames Valley	8	1	1	6	70	128	−58	6	3
9	Horowhenua	8	1	0	7	94	183	−89	15	2

=== Results ===
==== May ====
8 May 1976

Horowhenua	11–12	East Coast
Try: Mike Nutting; Lindsay Robinson; Pen: Lindsay Robinson		Pen: Vic Takarangi (4)

Park Domain Oval, Levin
Referee: Colin John Pedley (Wanganui)

==== June ====
7 June 1976

Wanganui	12–32	Taranaki
Try: Brent Dallison; Con: Bob Barrell; Pen: Bob Barrell (2)		Try: Alistair Scown (2); John O'Sullivan; Paul Wharehoka; Herbie Kowhai; Con: Paul Martin (2); Steve Davidson; Drop: Paul Martin; Ian Snook

Spriggens Park, Wanganui
Referee: Norm Thomas (Manawatu)

16 June 1976

Waikato	23–3	Thames Valley
Try: Peter Gilbert (2); Alan Clark; Dick Myers; Con: Andy Baker (2); Pen: Andy Baker		Pen: Graham Bax

Rugby Park, Hamilton
Referee: Harry Innes (North Auckland)

19 June 1976

Wanganui	45–4	Horowhenua
Try: Bruce Middleton (2); Bob Barrell (2); Francis Hill; Brent Dallison; Rob Manson; Con: Bob Barrell (4); Pen: Bob Barrell (3)		Try: Michael Brodie

Spriggins Park, Wanganui
Referee: Keith Harold Lawrence (Bay of Plenty)

26 June 1976

Thames Valley	4–12	East Coast
Try: David Strange		Try: Charlie Keelan; Wayne Truman; Jerry McClutchie

Rugby Park, Waihi
Referee: Gary Arthur Urbahn (North Auckland)

==== July ====
3 July 1976

East Coast	0–22	Poverty Bay
		Try: George Newlands; Pen: Glenn Ross (5); Drop: Glenn Ross

Uawa Domain, Tolaga Bay
Referee: Lawrence Robert Woodgate (Bay of Plenty)

14 July 1976

Thames Valley	9–9	King Country
Pen: Graham Bax (3)		Try: Murray Kidd; Con: Jim Barr; Pen: Jim Barr

Sports Domain, Te Aroha
Referee: Ian Burrell (Bay of Plenty)

24 July 1976

Wanganui	28–9	King Country
Try: Richard Murray; Brent Dallison; Peter Bailey; Ray Stafford; Bruce Middleton; Con: Bob Barrell (4)		Pen: Jim Barr (3)

Spriggens Park, Wanganui
Referee: Graeme Anderson (Nelson Bays)

28 July 1976

King Country	6–3	Wairarapa Bush
Try: Paul Bowen; Con: Jim Barr		Pen: Neil Kjestrup

The Domain, Taumarunui
Referee: Garry Klatt (Counties)

31 July 1976

Waikato	7–8	Wairarapa Bush
Try: Kevin Greene; Pen: Andy Baker		Try: Kevin Wayne Carter (2)

Rugby Park, Hamilton
Referee: Basil Marsh (Hawke's Bay)

==== August ====
7 August 1976

Horowhenua	11–16	Thames Valley
Try: Mike Nutting; Michael Brodie; Pen: Michael Brodie		Try: Pita Cherrington; David Strange; Con: Kerry Moloney; Pen: Kerry Moloney (2)

Park Domain Oval, Levin
Referee: Ian Diprose (Buller)

10 August 1976

Wairarapa Bush	20–11	Thames Valley
Try: Alistair John O'Neill; Con: Neil Kjestrup; Pen: Neil Kjestrup (2)		Try: David Strange; Donald George McMillan; Pen: Allen Henry Fisher

Memorial Park, Masterton
Referee: Alan Bailey (Wellington)

12 August 1976

Poverty Bay	13–6	Thames Valley
Try: Glenn Ross; Michael Whitehead; Con: Glenn Ross; Pen: Glenn Ross		Try: Kerry Moloney (2)

Rugby Park, Gisborne
Referee: Len Watkins (Hawke's Bay)

14 August 1976

Wairarapa Bush	18–4	East Coast
Try: Alistair John O'Neill; Ritchie Robertson; Con: Neil Kjestrup (2); Pen: Neil Kjestrup (2)		Try: Ray Falcon

Rugby Park, Pahiatua
Referee: Warwick Bringans (Wellington)

14 August 1976

Taranaki	16–6	King Country
Try: John O'Sullivan; Graham Mourie; Con: Steve Davidson; Pen: Steve Davidson (2)		Try: Murray Kidd; Con: Sam Pye

Rugby Park, New Plymouth
Referee: Norm Thomas (Manawatu)

17 August 1976

Thames Valley	12–20	Wanganui
Pen: Graham Bax (4)		Try: Rob Manson; Brent Dallison; Bruce Patrick; Con: Bob Barrell; Pen: Bob Barrell (2)

The Domain, Paeroa
Referee: E. G. Pennell (Auckland)

18 August 1976

King Country	9–8	Poverty Bay
Try: David Flavell; Con: Sam Pye; Drop: Malcolm Fluker		Try: Philip Duncan; Grant Allen

Island Reserve, Ōtorohanga
Referee: Lawrence Robert Woodgate (Bay of Plenty)

19 August 1976

East Coast	3–54	Wanganui
Pen: Terry Roberts		Try: Richard Murray (3); Bruce Patrick (2); Douglas Patchett; Rob Manson; John Knofflock penalty try Con: Bob Barrell (6); Pen: Bob Barrell (2)

Whakarua Park, Ruatoria
Referee: Kevin Hugh Lynch (Poverty Bay)

21 August 1976

Poverty Bay	7–17	Wanganui
Try: Robbie Newlands; Pen: John Whittle		Try: John Knofflock; Douglas Patchett; Con: Bob Barrell (2); Drop: Les Stowell

Rugby Park, Gisborne
Referee: Paul Anthony Arthur (Auckland)

21 August 1976

King Country	13–47	Waikato
Try: Murray Kidd; Jim Tarrant; Con: Jim Barr; Pen: Jim Barr		Try: Roger Litt (2); Kevin Magill; Murray Taylor; Alan Clark; Dick Myers; Peter Gilbert; Con: Andy Baker (5); Pen: Andy Baker (3)

The Domain, Taumarunui
Referee: Hugh Miller (Counties)

21 August 1976

Taranaki	6–3	Horowhenua
Pen: Steve Davidson (2)		Pen: Michael Brodie

Rugby Park, New Plymouth
Referee: Colin Aitken (Nelson Bays)

26 August 1976

East Coast	0–41	Taranaki
		Try: Stephen Brophy; Dennis Avison; Bryce McEldowney; Ian Eliason; John O'Sullivan; Alistair Scown; Con: Dennis Avison (4); Pen: Dennis Avison (3)

Whakarua Park, Ruatoria
Referee: Gordon Way (Thames Valley)

28 August 1976

Poverty Bay	6–43	Taranaki
Pen: Glenn Ross (2)		Try: Ross Fraser (2); Stephen Brophy (2); Paul Wharehoka; Con: Dennis Avison; Pen: Dennis Avison (3); Drop: Ian Snook (4)

Rugby Park, Gisborne
Referee: Ian Burrell (Bay of Plenty)

28 August 1976

Horowhenua	12–23	Wairarapa Bush
Try: Robbie Puklowski; Michael Brodie; Con: Michael Brodie (2)		Try: Michael Barnes (2); Brian McConnochie; Bruce Bernard Patrick; Con: Neil Kjestrup (2); Pen: Neil Kjestrup

Park Domain Oval, Levin
Referee: Lyall Daines (Marlborough)

28 August 1976

Wanganui	21–7	Waikato
Try: Rob Manson; Grant Mitchinson; Con: Bob Barrell (2); Pen: Bob Barrell (3)		Try: Michael Deane; Pen: Andy Baker

Spriggins Park, Wanganui
Referee: Tom Doocey (Canterbury)

==== September ====
4 September 1976

Poverty Bay	15–14	Waikato
Try: Nigel Shanks; Simon Spence; Con: John Whittle (2); Pen: John Whittle		Try: Clive Ormsby; Dick Myers; Drop: Murray Taylor (2)

Rugby Park, Gisborne
Referee: Nelson Burton Whittaker (Manawatu)

4 September 1976

Taranaki	42–10	Wairarapa Bush
Try: Stephen Brophy (2); John O'Sullivan (2); Graham Mourie; Dave Loveridge; Ian Eliason; Con: Dennis Avison (4); Pen: Dennis Avison; Drop: Paul Martin		Try: Nigel Sargent; Pen: Neil Kjestrup (2)

Rugby Park, New Plymouth
Referee: Colin John Pedley (Wairarapa Bush)

7 September 1976

East Coast	0–39	Waikato
		Try: Murray Taylor (2); Roger Litt (2); Kevin Magill; Peter Gilbert; Graeme Irwin; Ross McGlashan; Con: Andy Baker (2); Pen: Andy Baker

Whakarua Park, Ruatoria
Referee: Vic Thurston (Hawke's Bay)

8 September 1976

King Country	29–23	Horowhenua
Try: Murray Kidd (3); Graham Potaka; Sam Pye; David Flavell; Con: John Lang (3); Pen: John Lang		Try: Paul Lucas Martin (2); Mike Nutting; John William Luoni; Con: Michael Brodie (2); Pen: Michael Brodie

Rugby Park, Te Kūiti
Referee: Colin William Alford (King Country)

11 September 1976

Waikato	33–7	Horowhenua
Try: Clive Ormsby (2); Kevin Greene (2); John O'Rourke; Con: Roger Litt (2); Pen: Roger Litt (3)		Try: Mike Nutting; Pen: Michael Brodie

Rugby Park, Hamilton
Referee: Peter Richard Harpur (King Country)

11 September 1976

Wairarapa Bush	3–6	Poverty Bay
Pen: Neil Kjestrup		Try: George Newlands; Con: John Whittle

Memorial Park, Masterton
Referee: Jeremy Gilbert Oakley Stubbs (King Country)

15 September 1976

Horowhenua	23–15	Poverty Bay
Try: Mike Nutting (3); Geoffrey Wilfred Hobson; Con: Michael Brodie (2); Pen: Michael Brodie		Try: Graeme Thompson; Brett Sherriff; Con: Glenn Ross (2); Pen: Glenn Ross

Park Domain Oval, Levin
Referee: John Luckin (Taranaki)

16 September 1976

Thames Valley	9–20	Taranaki
Try: Huia Martin; Con: Graham Bax; Pen: Graham Bax (3)		Try: Dave Loveridge; John O'Sullivan; Pen: Dennis Avison (3); Drop: Ian Snook

Rugby Park, Waihi
Referee: Keith Harold Lawrence (Bay of Plenty)

18 September 1976

Wairarapa Bush	13–19	Wanganui
Try: Bruce Bernard Patrick; Pen: Neil Kjestrup (3)		Try: Bob Barrell; Richard Murray; Con: Bob Barrell; Pen: Bob Barrell (3)

Memorial Park, Masterton
Referee: Larry Auckram (Horowhenua)

18 September 1976

Waikato	3–9	Taranaki
Pen: Andy Baker		Try: Graham Mourie; Con: Dennis Avison; Pen: Paul Martin

Rugby Park, Hamilton
Referee: Bob Watson (North Auckland)

18 September 1976

King Country	25–10	East Coast
Try: Barry Donovan (2); Murray Kidd; Rod Takiari; Con: John Lang (3); Pen: Alan McDonald		Try: Jimmy Morice; Henry Reedy; Con: Terry Roberts

Island Reserve, Ōtorohanga
Referee: Lawrence Robert Woodgate (Bay of Plenty)

== Division 2 (South Island) ==
=== Standings ===
Pos	Team	Pld	W	D	L	PF	PA	PD	TF	Pts
1	South Canterbury	5	4	0	1	103	39	+64	14	8
2	Buller	5	3	0	2	64	40	+24	9	6
3	Nelson Bays	5	3	0	2	72	77	−5	11	6
4	Mid Canterbury	5	2	1	2	50	55	−5	6	5
5	West Coast	5	1	1	3	59	63	−4	6	3
6	North Otago	5	1	0	4	41	115	−74	6	2

=== Results ===
==== June ====
7 June 1976

Buller	9–14	Nelson Bays
Try: Calvin Cochrane; Con: Gerald Hart; Pen: Gerald Hart		Try: Stewart Robertson; Paul Burgess; Bob Neighbours; Con: Merrin Hodgson

Victoria Square, Westport
Referee: John Gordon Macdonald (North Otago)

==== July ====
17 July 1976

Nelson Bays	17–14	Mid Canterbury
Try: Colin Haigh (2); Pen: Bill Lucre (3)		Try: Peter MacGregor; Michael Tapley; Pen: Michael Tapley (2)

Trafalgar Park, Nelson
Referee: Larry Auckram (Horowhenua)

21 July 1976

Buller	6–7	Mid Canterbury
Pen: Gerald Hart (2)		Try: Michael Tapley; Pen: Michael Tapley

Victoria Square, Westport
Referee: Keith Armstrong (Canterbury)

24 July 1976

West Coast	9–9	Mid Canterbury
Try: Gavin Cook; Con: Russell Nelson; Pen: Russell Nelson		Pen: Michael Tapley

Cass Square, Hokitika
Referee: Peter Richard Harpur (King Country)

31 July 1976

West Coast	6–16	Buller
Pen: Russell Nelson		Try: Alec Fussell; Paddy Alexander; Con: Gerald Hart; Pen: Gerald Hart (2)

Rugby Park, Greymouth
Referee: Gordon Way (Thames Valley)

==== August ====
7 August 1976

Nelson Bays	24–3	North Otago
Try: Stewart Robertson; Bill Lucre; Colin Haigh; Gary Organ; Con: Bill Lucre; Pen: Bill Lucre (2)		Pen: Paddy Whyte

Rugby Park, Motueka
Referee: Robin Brown (Wairarapa Bush)

14 August 1976

Mid Canterbury	17–13	North Otago
Try: Alan Grieve (2); Michael Tapley; Con: Michael Tapley; Pen: Michael Tapley		Try: Richard May; Paddy Whyte; Con: Paddy Whyte; Pen: Paddy Whyte

Showgrounds, Ashburton
Referee: Laurie Craven (Marlborough)

14 August 1976

South Canterbury	15–9	West Coast
Try: Robin Heron; Con: Doug Nicol; Pen: Doug Nicol (3)		Try: Colin Skates; Con: Russell Nelson; Pen: Russell Nelson

Fraser Park, Timaru
Referee: Kevin McLoughlin (Otago)

17 August 1976

North Otago	16–7	West Coast
Try: Peter Johnson; Paddy Whyte; Bill Cooper; Con: Paddy Whyte (2)		Try: Bruce Davidson; Pen: Russell Nelson

Centennial Park, Oamaru
Referee: Murray Jarvis (Southland)

21 August 1976

Buller	14–7	South Canterbury
Try: Tony Mundy (2); John Dickson; Con: Gerald Hart		Try: Robin Heron; Pen: Doug Nicol

Victoria Square, Westport
Referee: Bob Francis (Wairarapa Bush)

24 August 1976

Nelson Bays	10–23	South Canterbury
Try: Greg Lummis; Pen: Bill Lucre (2)		Try: Peter Grant; Robin Heron; Alan McLaren; Con: Doug Nicol; Pen: Doug Nicol (3)

Trafalgar Park, Nelson
Referee: Baden George Whale (Wairarapa Bush)

==== September ====
4 September 1976

Mid Canterbury	3–10	South Canterbury
Pen: Michael Tapley		Try: Robin Heron; Pen: Doug Nicol; Drop: Tony Goddard

Showgrounds, Ashburton
Referee: Allan Creighton (Otago)

4 September 1976

Nelson Bays	7–28	West Coast
Try: Colin Haigh; Pen: Bill Lucre		Try: Gavin Cook (2); Jim Steffens; Con: Russell Nelson (2); Pen: Russell Nelson (2); Drop: Russell Nelson; Gavin Cook

Trafalgar Park, Nelson
Referee: Allan Lilley (Mid Canterbury)

11 September 1976

South Canterbury	48–3	North Otago
Try: Robin Heron (2); Geoff Hannan (2); Ian Palmer; Alan McLaren; Neville Richards; Paul Hewitson; Con: Doug Nicol (5); Pen: Doug Nicol (2)		Pen: Paddy Whyte

Fraser Park, Timaru
Referee: Murray Jarvis (Southland)

18 September 1976

North Otago	6–19	Buller
Try: Richard McNamara; Con: Barry Simpson		Try: Tony Mundy (2); Lindsay Kearns; Con: Tom Aldridge; Pen: Tom Aldridge (2)

Centennial Park, Oamaru
Referee: Arthur Gormack (Southland)

== Promotion/relegation matches ==
As North Auckland came last in Division 1, the unbeaten winners of Division 2 (North Island), Taranaki, were promoted to Division 1 to replace them.

South Canterbury won Division 2 (South Island), giving them a promotion play-off against Southland; they lost the game 24–11 remained in Division 2.
