= Ranfurly Shield 1970–1979 =

New Zealand rugby union trophy

Ranfurly Shield
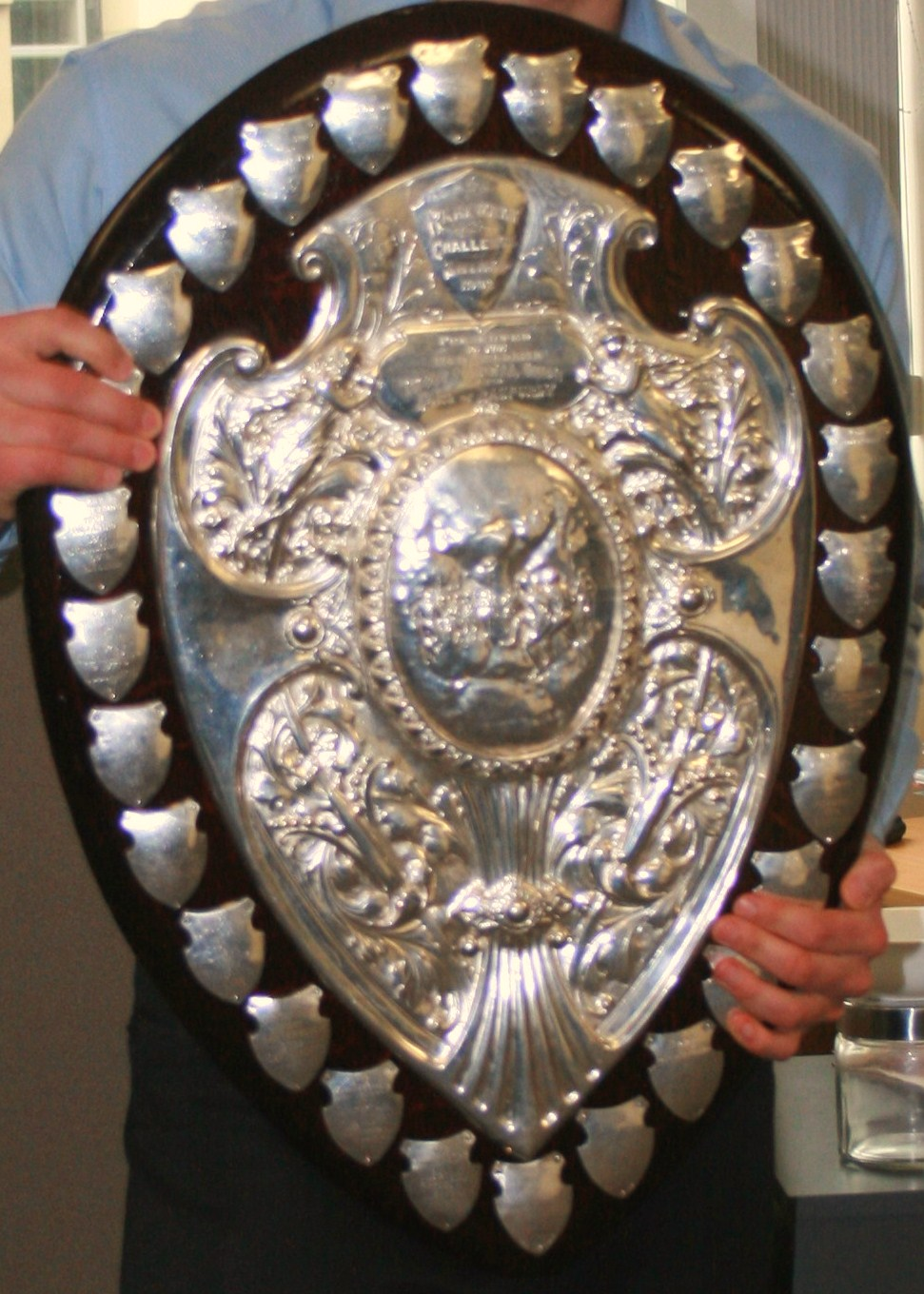
- Countries: New Zealand

Official website
- www.provincial.rugby/ranfurly-shield/

The Ranfurly Shield, colloquially known as the Log o' Wood, is a trophy in New Zealand's domestic rugby union competition. First played for in 1904, the Ranfurly Shield is based on a challenge system, rather than a league or knockout competition as with most football trophies. The holding union must defend the Shield in challenge matches, and if a challenger defeats them, they become the new holder of the Shield.

Canterbury began the decade as shield holders, and held it two separate times throughout the 1970s. Marlborough notably won their first shield challenge in 1973, and held it for six successful defences before losing it to South Canterbury.

== Fixtures ==
=== 1970 ===
8 August 1970	Canterbury	19–8	South Canterbury	Christchurch

29 August 1970	Canterbury	14–9	Waikato	Christchurch

5 September 1970	Canterbury	13–3	Taranaki	Christchurch

8 September 1970	Canterbury	19–8	Buller	Christchurch

16 September 1970	Canterbury	28–8	Mid Canterbury	Christchurch

19 September 1970	Canterbury	20–9	Southland	Christchurch

26 September 1970	Canterbury	16–12	Otago	Christchurch

30 September 1970	Canterbury	3–3	Wellington	Christchurch

=== 1971 ===
21 August 1971	Canterbury	19–8	North Otago	Christchurch

28 August 1971	Canterbury	16–20	Auckland	Christchurch

11 September 1971	Auckland	17–8	Counties	Auckland

18 September 1971	Auckland	12–17	North Auckland	Auckland
				Attendance: 47,000

25 September 1971	North Auckland	16–6	King Country	Whangarei

=== 1972 ===
1 July 1972	North Auckland	35–0	Buller	Whangarei

22 July 1972	North Auckland	31-3	Poverty Bay	Gisborne

29 July 1972	North Auckland	4–4	Manawatu	Whangarei

5 August 1972	North Auckland	27–15	Taranaki	Whangarei

12 August 1972	North Auckland	22–6	Bay of Plenty	Whangarei

26 August 1972	North Auckland	15–16	Auckland	Whangarei
				Attendance: 40,000

5 September 1972	Auckland	6–12	Canterbury	Auckland

16 September 1972	Canterbury	47–3	West Coast	Christchurch

27 September 1972	Canterbury	23–9	Otago	Christchurch

=== 1973 ===
28 July 1973	Canterbury	6–13	Marlborough	Christchurch

11 August 1973	Marlborough	36–0	Wairarapa Bush	Blenheim

1 September 1973	Marlborough	26–9	North Otago	Blenheim

8 September 1973	Marlborough	30–6	Wanganui	Blenheim

22 September 1973	Marlborough	29–9	Nelson Bays	Blenheim

29 September 1973	Marlborough	36–9	Mid Canterbury	Blenheim

=== 1974 ===
27 July 1974	Marlborough	18–0	West Coast	Blenheim

17 August 1974	Marlborough	6–18	South Canterbury	Blenheim

31 August 1974	South Canterbury	9–3	North Otago	Timaru

3 September 1974	South Canterbury	3–9	Wellington	Timaru

15 September 1974	Wellington	18–12	Waikato	Wellington

21 September 1974	Wellington	13–26	Auckland	Wellington

28 September 1974	Auckland	9–6	Waikato	Auckland

=== 1975 ===
13 August 1975	Auckland	22–0	Thames Valley	Auckland

30 August 1975	Auckland	19–6	Hawke's Bay	Auckland

6 September 1975	Auckland	19–14	Wellington	Auckland

10 September 1975	Auckland	7–6	Counties	Auckland

20 September 1975	Auckland	22–16	North Auckland	Auckland

27 September 1975	Auckland	17–13	Waikato	Auckland

30 September 1975	Auckland	13–4	Marlborough	Auckland

=== 1976 ===
4 August 1976	Auckland	16–9	Wanganui	Eden Park, Auckland

18 August 1976	Auckland	9–9	Southland	Eden Park, Auckland
	Pen: Steve Watt (3/3)		Try: Dave Saunders; Con: Geoff Valli (1/1); Pen: Geoff Valli (1/1)	Referee: Brian Walter Duffy (Taranaki)

21 August 1976	Auckland	10–12	Manawatu	Eden Park, Auckland
	Try: Andy Haden; Terry Morrison; Con: Steve Watt (1/2)		Try: Doug Rollerson; Con: Duncan Hales (1/1); Pen: Doug Rollerson (1/1); Drop: Doug Rollerson (1/1)	Referee: Colin Patrick Gregan (Waikato)

4 September 1976	Manawatu	36–16	Horowhenua	Showgrounds Oval, Palmerston North

12 September 1976	Manawatu	15–3	Hawke's Bay	Showgrounds Oval, Palmerston North
	Try: Murray Watts; Alan Campbell Innes; Con: Doug Rollerson (2/2); Pen: Doug Rollerson (1/1)		Pen: Richard Cox (1/1)	Referee: John Pring (Auckland)

=== 1977 ===
17 August 1977	Manawatu	12–6	Wairarapa Bush	Showgrounds Oval, Palmerston North
	Try: Kenneth Granger; Con: Mike Banks (1/1); Pen: Mike Banks (1/1); Doug Rollerson (1/1)		Pen: Neil Kjestrup (2/2)	Attendance: 6,000; Referee: Kevin Lynch (Poverty Bay)

20 August 1977	Manawatu	26–9	Wanganui	Showgrounds Oval, Palmerston North
	Try: Brian Morris (2); Mark Donaldson; Kevin Maharey; Con: Mike Banks (2/4); Pen: Mike Banks (2/2)		Try: Bob Barrell; Con: Murdock McKenzie (1/1); Pen: Bob Barrell (1/1)	Attendance: 12,000; Referee: Alan Taylor (Canterbury)

27 August 1977	Manawatu	15–10	Counties	Showgrounds Oval, Palmerston North
	Try: Jim Carroll; Con: Doug Rollerson (1/1); Pen: Mike Banks (2/2); Drop: Doug Rollerson (1/2)		Try: Peter Clotworthy; Con: Bob Lendrum (0/1); Pen: Bob Lendrum (2/2)	Attendance: 15,000; Referee: Colin Gregan (Waikato)

3 September 1977	Manawatu	21–7	Marlborough	Showgrounds Oval, Palmerston North
	Try: Kevin Maharey (2); John Callesen; Con: Doug Rollerson (0/3); Pen: Doug Rollerson (3/3)		Try: Brian Ford; Con: Brian Hunter (0/1); Drop: Brian Hunter (1/1)	Attendance: 7,000; Referee: Peter McDavitt (Wellington)

7 September 1977	Manawatu	18–6	Southland	Showgrounds Oval, Palmerston North
	Try: Alan Innes; Kenneth Granger; John Loveday; Con: Doug Rollerson (0/3); Pen: Doug Rollerson (1/1); Drop: Doug Rollerson (1/1)		Pen: Brian McKechnie (1/1); Drop: Brian McKechnie (1/1)	Attendance: 11,000; Referee: Keith Lawrence (Bay of Plenty)

17 September 1977	Manawatu	6–3	Taranaki	Showgrounds Oval, Palmerston North
	Try: Kevin Maharey; Con: Doug Rollerson (1/1)		Pen: Stephen Davidson (1/1)	Attendance: 22,000; Referee: John Pring (Auckland)

24 September 1977	Manawatu	17–3	Otago	Showgrounds Oval, Palmerston North
	Try: Hugh Blair; John Callesen; Con: Doug Rollerson (0/2); Pen: Doug Rollerson (2/2); Drop: Jim Carroll (1/1)		Pen: Bevan Wilson (1/1)	Attendance: 15,000; Referee: Alan Taylor (Canterbury)

=== 1978 ===
29 July 1978	Manawatu	51–10	West Coast	Showgrounds Oval, Palmerston North
	Try: Mac Thompson (2); Hugh Blair (3); Mick O'Callaghan; Kenneth Granger (3); Jim Carroll; Gary Knight; Con: Mac Thompson (1/10); Jim Carroll (1/1); Pen: Mac Thompson (1/3)		Try: Colin Skates; Con: Tony Kissick (0/1); Pen: Tony Kissick (2/2)	Attendance: 8,000; Referee: Jeff Walker (Otago)

5 August 1978	Manawatu	42–14	Horowhenua	Showgrounds Oval, Palmerston North
	Try: Hugh Blair; Kenneth Granger; Jim Carroll; Wayne Green; Perry Harris; Gary Knight; Con: Mike Banks (3/6); Pen: Mike Banks (2/2); Drop: Jim Carroll (2/2)		Try: Mike Nutting; John McKenzie; Warren Robinson; Con: Mark Liddicoat (1/3)	Attendance: 3,000; Referee: John Macdonald (North Otago)

29 August 1978	Manawatu	24–0	Poverty Bay	Showgrounds Oval, Palmerston North
	Try: Kenneth Granger; Jim Carroll; Geoff Old; Wayne Green; Con: Mike Banks (1/4); Pen: Mike Banks (1/1); Drop: Jim Carroll (1/1)			Attendance: 8,000; Referee: Colin Gregan (Waikato)

2 September 1978	Manawatu	13–6	Wellington	Showgrounds Oval, Palmerston North
	Try: Hugh Blair; Mick O'Callaghan; Con: Mike Banks (1/2); Pen: Mike Banks (1/1)		Pen: Brian Cederwall (2/2)	Attendance: 22,000; Referee: Mike Farnworth (Auckland)

12 September 1978	Manawatu	10–12	North Auckland	Showgrounds Oval, Palmerston North
	Try: Hugh Blair; Con: Mike Banks (0/1); Pen: Mike Banks (1/1); Drop: Jim Carroll (1/1)		Pen: Chippie Semenoff (4/4)	Attendance: 11,000; Referee: Bill Adlam (Wanganui)

=== 1979 ===
28 July 1979	North Auckland	21–6	King Country	Okara Park, Whangarei
	Try: David Haynes (2); Mike Burgoyne; Peter Sloane; Con: Eddie Dunn (1/4); Pen: Eddie Dunn (1/1)		Pen: John Lang (2/2)	Attendance: 5,000; Referee: Keith Lawrence (Bay of Plenty)

4 August 1979	North Auckland	35–3	Thames Valley	Okara Park, Whangarei
	Try: David Haynes; Charles Going; Eddie Dunn; Tuck Waaka (2); Peter Sloane; Con: Lloyd Roberts (3/5); Tuck Waaka (1/1); Pen: Tuck Waaka (1/1)		Pen: Peter Slavich (1/1)	Attendance: 6,500; Referee: Norm Thomas (Manawatu)

18 August 1979	North Auckland	29–6	Marlborough	Okara Park, Whangarei
	Try: David Haynes (2); Charles Going; Jo Pilcher; Ian Phillips; Peter Sloane; Con: Mike Gunson (1/6); Pen: Mike Gunson (0/4); Drop: Eddie Dunn (1/1)		Pen: Steve Marfell (2/2)	Attendance: 6,000; Referee: Dave Millar (Otago)

1 September 1979	North Auckland	20–12	South Canterbury	Okara Park, Whangarei
	Try: Ian Phillips; Lloyd Roberts; Con: Eddie Dunn (0/2); Pen: David Haynes (1/1); Eddie Dunn (1/1); Drop: Eddie Dunn (2/2)		Try: Dave Callon; Con: Tony Kelley (1/1); Pen: Tony Kelley (2/2)	Attendance: 5,000; Referee: Bob Francis (Wairarapa Bush)

11 September 1979	North Auckland	23–11	Taranaki	Okara Park, Whangarei
	Try: Mike Gunson; Steve Griffin (2); Tuck Waaka; Con: Tuck Waaka (1/3); Eddie Dunn (1/1); Pen: Tuck Waaka (1/1)		Try: Brett Gould; Dave Loveridge; Con: Paul Martin (1/2)	Attendance: 12,000; Referee: Murray Jarvis (Southland)

22 September 1979	North Auckland	3–9	Auckland	Okara Park, Whangarei
	Pen: Eddie Dunn (1/1)		Pen: Colin Farrell (1/1); Drop: Lindsay Harris (1/1); Richard Dunn (1/1)	Attendance: 32,000; Referee: Brian Duffy (Taranaki)

29 September 1979	Auckland	11–9	Counties	Eden Park, Auckland
	Try: Colin Farrell; Tim Twigden; Con: Richard Dunn (0/2); Pen: Richard Dunn (1/1)		Try: Hank Habraken; Con: Mark Codlin (1/1); Pen: Mark Codlin (1/1)	Attendance: 50,100; Referee: Bob Francis (Wairarapa Bush)
