= Lendrum =

Lendrum is a surname. Notable people with the surname include:

- Bob Lendrum (born 1948), New Zealand rugby union player
- J. Tom Lendrum (born 1927), American politician

== See also ==
- Lendrum Place, Edmonton, a neighbourhood in Canada
