= John Brake =

John Brake may refer to:

- John Brake (rugby union, born 1952), New Zealand rugby union player and coach
- John Brake (rugby union, born 1988), English rugby union and rugby sevens player
