= Ralph Caulton =

Rugby player (1937–2024)

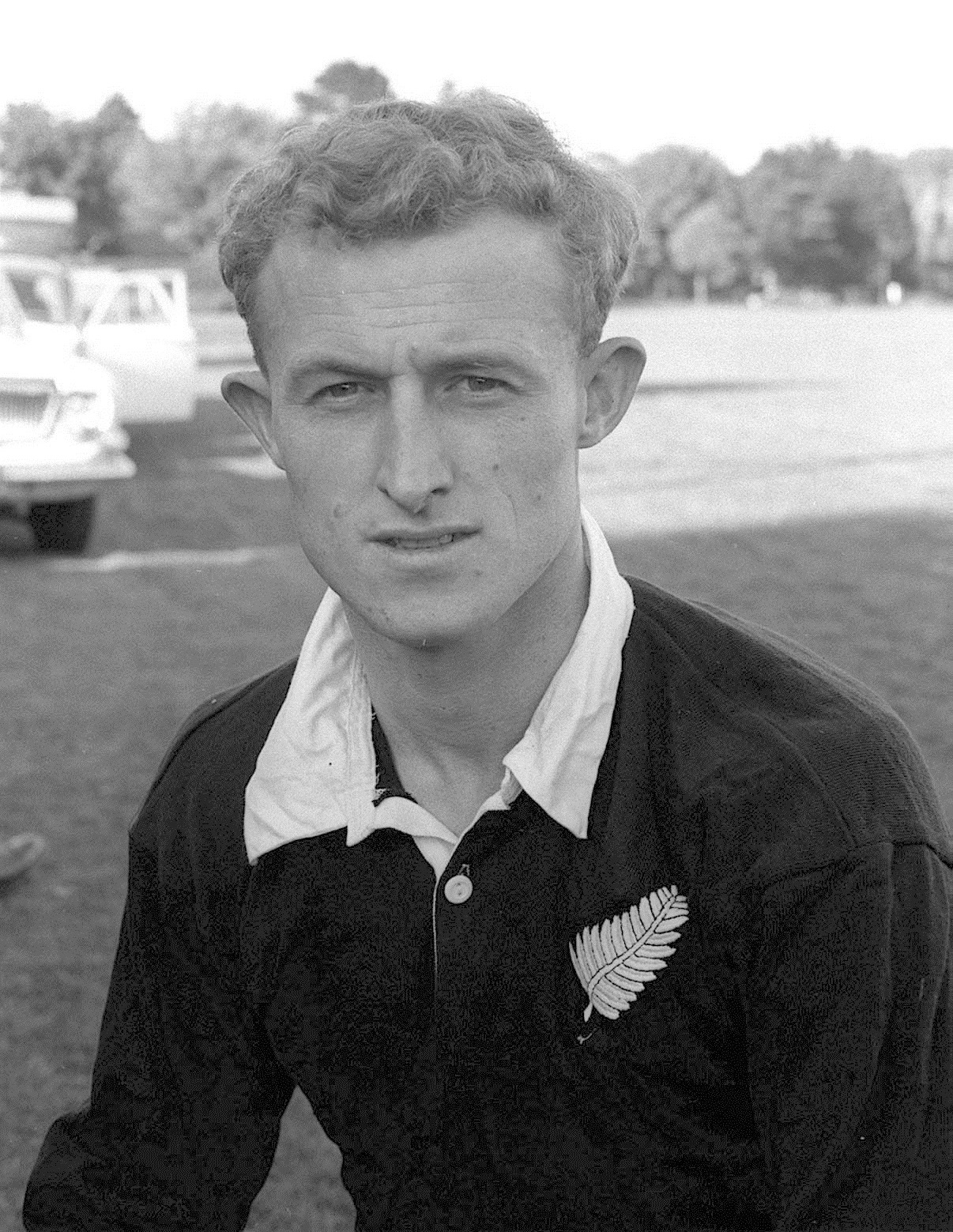
- Caulton in 1959
- Born: Ralph Walter Caulton; 10 January 1937 Wellington, New Zealand
- Died: 9 June 2024 (aged 87) Nelson, New Zealand
- Height: 1.81 m (5 ft 11 in)
- Weight: 77 kg (170 lb)
- School: Wellington College

Rugby union career
- Position: Wing
Provincial / State sides
Years	Team	Apps	(Points)
1957–1965	Wellington		
International career
Years	Team	Apps	(Points)
1959–1964	New Zealand	16	(24)

Ralph Walter Caulton (10 January 1937 – 9 June 2024) was a New Zealand rugby union player. A wing, Caulton played for the Poneke club and represented Wellington at a provincial level.

Caulton was a member of the New Zealand national side, the All Blacks, from 1959 to 1964. He played 50 matches for the All Blacks including 16 internationals. He scored two tries in each of his first two test matches against the 1959 British Lions and scored eight tries in total in his 16 test matches.

Later, Caulton was a Marlborough selector in the 1970s, including the period they held the Ranfurly Shield after winning it from Canterbury. He served on the committees of both the Wellington and New Zealand Rugby Unions, and in 1985 was coach of the national under-17 rugby team. Caulton died in Nelson on 9 June 2024, at the age of 87.
