= Eric Anderson (rugby union) =

- Born: Eric James Anderson; 4 April 1931 Whakatāne, New Zealand
- Died: 27 July 2014 (aged 83)
- Height: 1.85 m (6 ft 1 in)
- Weight: 94 kg (207 lb)
- School: Te Puke High School
- Occupation: Stock buyer

Rugby union career
- Position(s): Lock, prop
Provincial / State sides
| Years | Team | Apps | (Points) |
| 1956–61 | Bay of Plenty | 28 | |
International career
| Years | Team | Apps | (Points) |
| 1960 | New Zealand | 0 | (0) |
Coaching career
- Years: Team
- 1974–78: Bay of Plenty

Eric James Anderson (4 April 1931 – 27 July 2014) was a New Zealand rugby union player and coach. Originally a lock, Anderson represented Bay of Plenty at a provincial level, and was a member of the New Zealand national side, the All Blacks, in 1960, playing as a prop. He played 10 matches for the All Blacks but did not make any test appearances. He later became the coach of the Bay of Plenty team, taking them to the inaugural NPC first division title in 1976.
