= Colin Farrell (rugby union) =

New Zealand rugby union player (born 1956)

- Born: Colin Paul Farrell; 19 March 1956 (age 70) Auckland, New Zealand
- Height: 1.78 m (5 ft 10 in)
- Weight: 76 kg (12 st 0 lb)
- School: St Paul's College

Rugby union career
- Position: Fullback
Provincial / State sides
Years	Team	Apps	(Points)
1974–81	Auckland	77	
International career
Years	Team	Apps	(Points)
1977	New Zealand	2	(0)

Colin Paul Farrell (born 19 March 1956) is a former New Zealand rugby union player. A fullback, Farrell represented Auckland at a provincial level. He played two test matches for the New Zealand national side, the All Blacks, in 1977 against the touring British Lions side.

== Playing career ==
Farrell was only a 17-year old when he first played for Suburbs in Auckland senior club rugby and in 1974, aged 18, he was selected in the Auckland provincial team. He also played for the New Zealand Colts side in 1976.

He played 77 games for Auckland from 1974 and 1981, including the following:

- 26-23 win and successful Ranfurly Shield challenge against Wellington in 1974
- 13-10 win over the 1976 Ireland tourists, scoring a try
- 15-34 loss to the 1977 Lions
- 9-3 win in a successful Ranfurly Shield match against North Auckland (1979)
- 11-9 win over Counties in their 1979 Ranfurly Shield defence, scoring a try
- 12-39 loss to the 1981 Springboks, scoring a try.

Farrell was a surprise selection in the All Black team, coached by Jack Gleeson, to play against the 1977 Lions. He was chosen on the recommendation of Bryan Williams. However, Farrell's test matches against the Lions did not go well for him and he was dropped from the team in favour of Bevan Wilson and never selected again.

Farrell later spent three years playing rugby for Parma in Italy before coaching at Rovigo and Parma.

His brother, Brian, represented Auckland in 1972 and 1974.
