= Ian Snook =

New Zealand cricketer

Personal information
- Full name: Ian Robert Snook
- Born: 7 May 1950 (age 76); Dunedin, New Zealand
- Batting: Right-handed
- Bowling: Right-arm off-spin
- Role: Batsman

Domestic team information
- Years: Team
- 1971/72–1987/88: Central Districts

Career statistics
Competition	First-class	List A
Matches	40	22
Runs scored	1,344	452
Batting average	21.00	22.60
100s/50s	1/5	0/4
Top score	100*	65
Balls bowled	132	2
Wickets	1	0
Bowling average	107.00	–
5 wickets in innings	0	–
10 wickets in match	0	–
Best bowling	1/8	–
Catches/stumpings	23/–	8/–
- Source: Cricinfo, 6 September 2024

Ian Robert Snook (born 7 May 1950) is a former New Zealand cricketer who played for Central Districts between 1972 and 1988.

Snook was born in Dunedin. He scored his maiden first-class century in his last first-class match in 1987–88, when he captained Central Districts. He captained the New Zealand Under-23 cricket team in their annual first-class match in February 1972. He also played for Taranaki and Wairarapa in the Hawke Cup between 1968 and 1989, captaining Taranaki to the title in 1983–84 and 1987–88. In October 2024 he was awarded life membership of the Taranaki Cricket Association for his contribution to the game in the Taranaki region as player, coach and administrator.

Snook holds the unusual record for the most runs conceded by a bowler in a one-over spell in first-class cricket. Playing for Central Districts against the touring England team at Palmerston North during the 1983–84 season, Snook's only over cost 32 runs, courtesy of some big hitting by Ian Botham.

Snook was also a talented rugby player, representing Taranaki at first five, and then Wairarapa Bush, in the late 1970s. He has coached Clifton's Senior A side in the Taranaki club rugby competition and later coached Francis Douglas Memorial College's 1st XV along with former Taranaki hooker Shane MacDonald. Snook wrote a weekly sports column in the Taranaki Daily News until December 2017.
