= Lin Colling =

NZ international rugby union player

- Born: George Lindsay Colling; 27 August 1946 Cromwell, New Zealand
- Died: 13 July 2003 (aged 56) Auckland, New Zealand
- Height: 1.75 m (5 ft 9 in)
- Weight: 74 kg (163 lb)
- School: Cromwell District High School
- Notable relative: Belinda Colling (niece)

Rugby union career
- Position: Halfback
Provincial / State sides
Years	Team	Apps	(Points)
1967–1973	Otago		
1974–1976	Auckland		
International career
Years	Team	Apps	(Points)
1972–1973	New Zealand	0	(0)

George Lindsay Colling (27 August 1946 – 13 July 2003) was a New Zealand rugby union player, coach and administrator. A halfback, Colling represented Otago and Auckland at a provincial level, and was a member of the New Zealand national side, the All Blacks, in 1972 and 1973. He played 21 matches for the All Blacks but did not appear in any internationals.

== Post-retirement life ==
Colling went on to coach Ponsonby alongside Bryan Williams, and also was an All Black selector in 1994. He also served on the board of the Auckland Rugby Union. Colling died of a brain tumour in Auckland in 2003.

== Personal life ==
Colling was married, and had two children. His niece, Belinda Colling, represented New Zealand in both basketball and netball.
