= Alan McNaughton =

- Born: Alan Murray McNaughton; 5 July 1947 (age 79) Christchurch, New Zealand
- Height: 1.88 m (6 ft 2 in)
- Weight: 90 kg (200 lb)
- School: Rotorua Boys' High School

Rugby union career
- Position: Flanker
Provincial / State sides
Years	Team	Apps	(Points)
1968–80	Bay of Plenty	122	
International career
Years	Team	Apps	(Points)
1971–72	New Zealand	3	(0)

Alan Murray McNaughton (born 5 July 1947) is a former New Zealand rugby union player. A flanker, McNaughton represented Bay of Plenty at a provincial level, and was a member of the New Zealand national side, the All Blacks, from 1971 to 1972. He played nine matches for the All Blacks including three internationals.
