= Jon McLachlan =

New Zealand rugby union footballer (1949–2024)

- Full name: Jon Stanley McLachlan
- Born: 23 June 1949 Auckland, New Zealand
- Died: 3 December 2024 (aged 75) Papamoa, New Zealand
- Height: 1.80 m (5 ft 11 in)
- Weight: 78 kg (172 lb)
- School: Selwyn College

Rugby union career
- Position: Wing
Provincial / State sides
Years	Team	Apps	(Points)
1970–1978	Auckland	54	(76)
International career
Years	Team	Apps	(Points)
1974	New Zealand	1	(0)

Jon Stanley McLachlan (23 June 1949 – 3 December 2024) was a New Zealand rugby union player. A wing, McLachlan represented Auckland at a provincial level, and was a member of the New Zealand national side, the All Blacks, on their 1974 tour of Australia and Fiji. He played eight matches for the All Blacks including one international. McLachlan died at Papamoa on 3 December 2024, at the age of 75.
