= Geoff Valli =

- Born: Geoffrey Thomas Valli; 3 November 1954 (age 72) Nightcaps, New Zealand
- Height: 1.78 m (5 ft 10 in)
- Weight: 86 kg (190 lb)
- School: Nightcaps District High School
- Occupation: Builder

Rugby union career
- Position: Fullback
Provincial / State sides
Years	Team	Apps	(Points)
1974–76, 1980	Southland	42	(352)
1981–84	North Auckland	32	(216)
International career
Years	Team	Apps	(Points)
1975	New Zealand Colts	4	
1980	New Zealand	0	(0)

Geoffrey Thomas Valli (born 3 November 1954) is a former New Zealand rugby union player. A full-back, Valli represented Southland and North Auckland at a provincial level. He played a single game for the New Zealand national side, the All Blacks, against Fiji in 1980, for which the New Zealand Rugby Union did not award full international caps.

Valli's brother, Keith, was killed in the Pike River Mine disaster in 2010.
