= 1980 Fiji rugby union tour of New Zealand =

Summary
P	W	D	L
Total
12	4	0	8
Test match
1	1	0	0
Opponent
P	W	D	L
New Zealand XV
1	1	0	0

The 1980 Fiji rugby union tour of New Zealand was a series of twelve matches by the Fiji national rugby union team in New Zealand in August and September 1980. The Fiji team won only four of the twelve matches, and lost the single international match against a New Zealand XV – for which New Zealand did not award full international caps.

== Matches ==
Scores and results list Fiji-s points tally first.

Opposing Team	For	Against	Date	Venue	Status
Wanganui	11	16	6 August 1980	Wanganui	Tour match
Wellington	8	24	9 August 1980	Wellington	Tour match
West Coast	28	12	13 August 1980	Greymouth	Tour match
Canterbury	4	10	16 August 1980	Christchurch	Tour match
Southland	22	21	19 August 1980	Invercargill	Tour match
Otago	10	18	23 August 1980	Dunedin	Tour match
Hawke's Bay	28	19	26 August 1980	Napier	Tour match
NZ Maori	9	22	30 August 1980	Rotorua	Tour match
King Country	31	22	3 September 1980	Taumarunui	Tour match
Counties	10	35	6 September 1980	Pukekohe	Tour match
North Auckland	4	38	9 September 1980	Whangārei	Tour match
New Zealand XV	0	33	13 September 1980	Eden Park, Auckland	Test match
