= Kit Fawcett =

New Zealand rugby union player

- Born: Christopher Louis Fawcett; 28 October 1954 (age 72) Matamata, New Zealand
- Height: 1.85 m (6 ft 1 in)
- Weight: 87 kg (192 lb)
- School: Matamata College; St Paul's Collegiate School
- University: University of Otago; University of Waikato
- Occupations: Teacher; property manager

Rugby union career
- Position(s): Fullback, three-quarter
Provincial / State sides
Years	Team	Apps	(Points)
1975	Otago	6	(8)
1977	Waikato	22	(23)
International career
Years	Team	Apps	(Points)
1976	New Zealand	2	(0)
1975–1978	NZ Universities	11	(128)

Christopher Louis Fawcett (born 27 October 1954) is a former New Zealand rugby union player. A fullback and three-quarter, Fawcett represented Otago and Waikato at a provincial level, and was a member of the New Zealand national side, the All Blacks, on the 1976 tour to South Africa. He played 13 matches on that tour including two internationals.
