= Bay of Plenty Rugby Union =

New Zealand rugby union club

- Sport: Rugby union
- Jurisdiction: Bay of Plenty Region
- Abbreviation: BOPRU (also known as the steamers)
- Founded: 1911; 115 years ago
- Affiliation: New Zealand Rugby
- Headquarters: Mount Maunganui

Official website
- www.boprugby.co.nz
- (New Zealand)

The Bay of Plenty Rugby Union (also referred to as "Bay of Plenty" or "BOPRU") is the governing body for rugby union in a portion of the Bay of Plenty Region of New Zealand. Its colours are dark blue and yellow in a hooped design. The BOPRU govern the running of the Bay of Plenty representative team which have won New Zealand's first-tier domestic competition National Provincial Championship (Air New Zealand Cup and ITM Cup) once. Their most recent victory was the 1976 competition, they were the first side to win the competition. Bay of Plenty also acts as a primary feeder to the Chiefs, who play in the Super Rugby competition.

The union also administers all club rugby within the region, including the Bayfair Baywide competition and other senior club rugby. The union is also responsible for school rugby.

== History ==
Bay of Plenty played a prominent role in the early history of rugby in New Zealand. The 1888–89 New Zealand Natives (the first New Zealand representative rugby team to tour beyond Australia) included five Warbrick brothers from the small Bay of Plenty settlement of Matata. Dave Gallaher, the captain of the legendary 1905 All Black Originals, grew up in Katikati. But it was not until 1911 that a separate Bay of Plenty Rugby Football Union was established. Before then Bay of Plenty was included within the South Auckland union. The current nickname for the team is the "Steamers".

=== Representatives ===
Bay of Plenty-based players were amongst the earliest teams in the formative years of the game, but it was not until 1911 that the Bay of Plenty union was fully affiliated to the national body. Up until this time the BOP union was included within the South Auckland union boundaries. As the boundaries of the new union grew, and new sub-unions were formed, the union achieved its first national representation when A.L. McLean was selected for the All Blacks in 1921. McLean was the first of 27 men who have represented New Zealand while wearing the blue and gold hoops, in addition to the many players who received their rugby education in the Bay of Plenty before achieving international selection elsewhere. As the area of Maori rugby the region has produced a large number of Māori All Blacks, while age group and secondary school teams from throughout the union have also established a long and consistent competitive record.

=== Great players ===
Sam Cane who hails from Reporoa is the most capped All Black who has represented Bay of Plenty. Cane has 104 caps for the New Zealand National team and was the captain since the start of 2020 to the end of 2023.

Les McLean was the first of the 27 players who have so far been selected for the All Blacks from Bay of Plenty. He played as a forward in the second and third tests against the 1921 Springboks – and at full-back against New South Wales in 1923.

Hika Reid hails from Ngongotahā near Rotorua, Reid's grandfather, J. Hikatarewa, played for New Zealand Maori in 1913. Reid was selected for the All Blacks in 1980 when test incumbent Andy Dalton was unavailable for what turned out to be a disappointing tour of Australia. Reid's performances at hooker, however, were impressive. A dynamic runner with ball in hand, he revolutionised the way in which hookers played the game. Sean Fitzpatrick was the most famous of those to adopt this high-energy approach. His try in the second test victory over Australia in Brisbane has been described as one of 'the most spectacular tries in test history'. He started and finished a move that began 10 m from his own try line. Despite this sort of ability, for much of his career Reid was Andy Dalton's understudy. By 1986 he had also slipped behind Fitzpatrick, and he was overlooked for the 1987 World Cup.

Greg Rowlands, a 1976 All Black to Argentina, holds the record for the most games – 161 – and most points – 1008 – for Bay of Plenty.

== Honours ==
- NPC/Air New Zealand Cup/ITM Cup (1):

1976

- Ranfurly Shield (1):

2004 (1)

- Melrose Sevens (1):

1992

== Stadia ==
As being a larger region than most, the Steamers are one of the few teams to have two home stadiums, the Tauranga Domain in Tauranga and Rotorua International Stadium in Rotorua.

=== Tauranga Domain ===
Tauranga Domain has a capacity of 5,000 people and hosted Bay of Plenty games up until 2000 and since 2015. There are also plans for a 20,000 seat boutique stadium, to help revitalise the city centre of Tauranga which has struggled due to the development of suburban malls and earthquake strengthening closing a number of CBD buildings.

=== Baypark Stadium ===
Built in 2000, opened in 2001 and formerly known as Bluechip stadium and Western Bay Stadium, Baypark stadium is a multi-purpose stadium that the Bay of Plenty Steamers use as a home ground along with Rotorua International Stadium. It has a capacity of 19,800, which was almost attained when Bay of Plenty had the Ranfurly Shield run of 2004. Baypark was subsequently shunned in favour of Tauranga Domain due to the stadium's poor surface and the lack of proximity between the fans and the players due to the racing track circling the pitch.

=== Rotorua International Stadium ===
With a capacity of 34,000, Rotorua International Stadium is one of the larger stadiums in New Zealand, but doesn't get the matches that will draw the crowds. It is one of the two stadiums that the Steamers use as a home field, with many considering it the home of Bay of Plenty Rugby. It is also known as "The Hangi Pit", because of the mud-pools around Rotorua.

== Other representative teams ==
In addition to the Men's 1st XV, the BOPRU has a number of other representative teams for both Men and Women. BOPRU is part of the Women's Provincial Championship.

== Club Rugby ==
The Bay of Plenty Rugby Union holds union-wide and sub-union competitions including the Kusabs Cup, the premier Bay of Plenty rugby trophy starting in 1912. It has 38 local clubs under affiliated with them and three sub-unions to be part of. The Baywide competition runs for 20–21 weeks and split to four stages:

- Local Sub-Union Competition
- Baywide Round One
- Baywide Championship Round
- Bartercard Baywide Semi-finals and Finals Day

The 38 clubs are split into three sub-unions, the Central, Eastern and Western Sub-Unions.

=== Central ===
There are ten clubs in the Central Bay of Plenty sub-union.

- Kahukura Rugby Sports Club
- Whakarewarewa Rugby Community Sports
- Rotoiti Sports & Community Association
- Waikite Sports Club
- Ngongotaha Sports & Community Association
- Reporoa Rugby Club
- Marist St Michael's Rugby & Sports Club
- Eastern Pirates Rotorua Sports & Cultural Club
- Murupara Rugby & Sports Club
- Painoaiho Sports & Social Club

=== Eastern ===
There are 14 clubs in the Eastern Bay of Plenty sub-union.

- Te Teko Rugby Football Club
- Whakatane United Rugby Sports Club
- Opotiki Rugby
- Poroporo Rugby Club
- Kawerau Sports Club
- Paroa Sports Rugby Club
- Taneatua Rugby Club
- Edgecumbe Sports Club
- Matata Rugby & Sports Club
- Ruatoki Sports & Cultural Club
- Waimana Rugby Club
- Waiohau Rugby Sports & Cultural Club
- Te Whanau A Apanui Sports Club
- Galatea Rugby Football Club

=== Western ===
There are 13 clubs in the Western Bay of Plenty sub-union.

- Tauranga Sports Club "The Raptors"
- Te Puke Sports & Recreation Club "The Dirty Mustard Pirates"
- Rangataua Sports & Cultural Club "The Maori Mud Crabs"
- Mount Maunganui Sports Club "The Marlins"
- Te Puna Rugby Football Club
- Rangiuru Sports Club
- Greerton Marist Recreation & Community Sports Club "The Mighty Gurnards"
- Arataki Sports Club
- Judea Rugby Club
- Papamoa Rugby Club
- Eastern Districts Rugby & Sports Club
- Matakana Island Recreation & Community
- Katikati Rugby Football Club

=== Structure ===
Stage One runs for 6–7 weeks, clubs are put into their respective sub-unions and complete a local competition. 24 teams are put into 2 sections with 2 groups of 6 in each section. Each teams faces the other teams in their group once with the Rugby Union Bonus Points System used to determine their placings.

- Championship Round

The four top placed teams after a round-robin from each group in the top section go on to compete in the Baywide Premier competition for the Kusabs Cup. The two bottom placed teams each group of section 1 and the two top placed teams from the two groups of section 2 go on to compete in the first division. The remaining eight teams compete in the second division. And division three is made of teams from the local competitions.

Each division goes through a round-robin where every team faces each other and the top four from each division goes on to the Bartercard Baywide Semi-finals and Finals Day.

- Semi-finals and finals day

The semi-finals and finals are played over two weeks and the Premier Division Champions win the Kusabs Cup. In recent years the Tauranga Raptors have won the premier title in the Bay of Plenty four consecutive times 2007–10.

=== Baywide Premier Club Champions ===
The Baywide Club Championship (rather than sub-union club championships) started in 1990. The following are the champions:

Year	Champion club
1990	Waikite (1)
1991	Eastern Pirates (1)
1992	Whakatane Marist (1)
1993	Mount Maunganui (1)
1994	Eastern Pirates (2)
1995	Whakatane Marist (2)
1996	Waikite (2)
1997	Ngongotaha (1)
1998	Ngongotaha (2)
1999	Tauranga Sports (1)
2000	Waikite (3)
2001	Waikite (4)
2002	Whakarewarewa (1)
2003	Tauranga Sports (2)
2004	Whakatane Marist (3)
2005	Mount Maunganui (2)
2006	Whakarewarewa (2)
2007	Tauranga Sports (3)
2008	Tauranga Sports (4)
2009	Tauranga Sports (5)
2010	Tauranga Sports (6)
2011	Te Puke Sports (1)
2012	Te Puke Sports (2)
2013	Tauranga Sports (7)
2014	Mount Maunganui (3)
2015	Tauranga Sports (8)
2016	Rangataua (1)
2017	Mount Maunganui (4)
2018	Te Puke Sports (3)
2019	Te Puna (1)
2020	Western Final: Tauranga Sports
2020	Central Final: Whakarewarewa
2021	Tauranga Sports (10)
2022	Mount Maunganui (4)
2023	Te Puna (2)
2024	Te Puke Sports (4)
2025	Whakarewarewa (3)
2026	Greerton Marist (1)

=== Recent Baywide Premier Trophy club finals ===
- 2026 - Greerton Marist 37-17 Te Puke
- 2025 - Whakarewarewa 29-25 Tauranga Sports
- 2024 - Te Puke 22-17 Greerton Marist
- 2023 - Te Puna 23-14 Mount Maunganui
- 2022 - Mount Maunganui 27-25 Te Puna

== All Blacks ==
This is a list of players who have represented New Zealand from the Bay of Plenty representative rugby union team. Players are listed by the decade they were first selected.

=== 1920–1929 ===
- Andrew Leslie McLean – 1921
- Leslie Frank Cupples – 1924

=== 1950–1959 ===
- William Ngataiawhio Gray – 1955
- Richard James Conway – 1959

=== 1960–1969 ===
- Eric James Anderson – 1960
- Arthur Grahn Jennings – 1967

=== 1970–1979 ===
- Alan Murray McNaughton – 1971
- Grant Bernard Batty – 1972
- Graeme Murray Crossman – 1974
- Leonard John Brake – 1976
- Gregory David Rowlands – 1976
- Edward James Taite Stokes – 1976
- Norman Mark Taylor – 1977

=== 1980–1989 ===
- Hikatarewa Rockcliffe Reid – 1980
- Frank Nuki Ken Shelford – 1981
- Arthur Massey Stone – 1981
- Gary John Braid – 1983

=== 2000–2009 ===
- Kevin Senio – 2005
- Mike Peter Delany – 2009
- Tanerau Dylan Latimer – 2009

=== 2010–2019 ===
- Sam Jordan Cane – 2012
- Brodie Allan Retallick – 2012
- Nathan Paul Harris - 2014

=== 2020-2029 ===
- Aidan Ross - 2022
- Emoni Narawa - 2023
- Viliami Pasilio Tosi - 2024
- Leroy Carter - 2025
