= Eddie Stokes =

- Born: Edward James Taite Stokes; 26 June 1950 (age 76) Auckland, New Zealand
- Height: 1.80 m (5 ft 11 in)
- Weight: 92 kg (203 lb)
- School: Mount Maunganui College

Rugby union career
- Position: Centre
Provincial / State sides
Years	Team	Apps	(Points)
1971–81	Bay of Plenty	128	
International career
Years	Team	Apps	(Points)
1972–79	New Zealand Māori	28	
1976	New Zealand	0	(0)

Edward James Taite Stokes (born 26 June 1950) is a former New Zealand rugby union player. A centre, Stokes represented Bay of Plenty at a provincial level, and was a member of the New Zealand national side, the All Blacks, on the 1976 tour of South America. He participated in five matches during the tour, one of which was against Uruguay; however, international caps were not awarded for that game.
