= Greg Rowlands =

New Zealand rugby player (1947–2021)

- Born: Gregory David Rowlands; 10 December 1947 Rotorua, New Zealand
- Died: 15 August 2021 (aged 73) Tauranga, New Zealand
- Height: 1.70 m (5 ft 7 in)
- Weight: 74 kg (163 lb)
- School: Tauranga Boys' College

Rugby union career
- Position: Fullback
Provincial / State sides
Years	Team	Apps	(Points)
1969–82	Bay of Plenty	161	(1008)
International career
Years	Team	Apps	(Points)
1976	New Zealand	0	(0)

Gregory David Rowlands (10 December 1947 – 15 August 2021) was a New Zealand rugby union player. A fullback, Rowlands represented Bay of Plenty at a provincial level, and was a member of the New Zealand national side, the All Blacks, on their 1976 tour of South America. He played four matches for the All Blacks on the tour including two matches against Argentina, but these were not given full international status by the New Zealand Rugby Union.

Rowlands died in Tauranga on 15 August 2021, aged 73.
