= Tim Twigden =

- Born: Timothy Moore Twigden; 14 May 1952 (age 74) Taumarunui, New Zealand
- Height: 1.75 m (5 ft 9 in)
- Weight: 81 kg (179 lb)
- School: Auckland Grammar School

Rugby union career
- Position: Wing, centre
Provincial / State sides
Years	Team	Apps	(Points)
1975–80	Auckland	71	
International career
Years	Team	Apps	(Points)
1979–80	New Zealand	2	(0)

Timothy Moore Twigden (born 14 May 1952) is a former New Zealand rugby union player. A wing and centre, Twigden represented Auckland at a provincial level, and was a member of the New Zealand national side, the All Blacks, in 1979 and 1980. He played 15 matches for the All Blacks including two internationals. Tim and his twin brother Greg were prominent surf life saving beach sprint champions competing at national level in this sport.
