= Clive Currie =

New Zealand sportsman

- Born: Clive James Currie; 25 December 1955 (age 70) Wellington, New Zealand
- Height: 1.83 m (6 ft 0 in)
- Weight: 86 kg (190 lb)
- School: Rongotai College
- Occupation: School teacher

Rugby union career
- Position: Fullback
Provincial / State sides
Years	Team	Apps	(Points)
1975–77	Wellington	26	
1978	Canterbury	1	
International career
Years	Team	Apps	(Points)
1976	New Zealand Colts	2	
1978	New Zealand	2	(0)
- Cricket career

Cricket information
- Batting: Left-handed
- Bowling: Right-arm offbreak
- Role: Batsman

Domestic team information
- Years: Team
- 1976/77: Wellington
- FC debut: 7 January 1977 Wellington v Canterbury
- Last FC: 5 February 1977 Wellington v Australia
- Only LA: 13 March 1977 Wellington v Northern Districts

Career statistics
Competition	First-class	List A
Matches	3	1
Runs scored	59	2
Batting average	14.75	2.00
100s/50s	0/0	0/0
Top score	36*	2
Catches/stumpings	1/–	0/–
- Source: CricketArchive, 7 September 2014

Clive James Currie (born 25 December 1955) is a former New Zealand rugby union player and cricketer.

== Rugby union ==
A fullback, Currie represented Wellington and Canterbury at a provincial level, and was a member of the New Zealand national side, the All Blacks, on their 1978 tour of Britain and Ireland. He played four matches on that tour, including two internationals, before receiving a broken jaw in the test against Wales.

== Cricket ==
A left-handed batsman and right-arm offbreak bowler, Currie played for the New Zealand secondary schools cricket team, and later appeared in three first-class matches for Wellington during the 1976–77 season.
