= Duncan Hales =

New Zealand international rugby union player (1947–2024)

- Hales in 1972
- Born: Duncan Alister Hales; 22 November 1947 Dannevirke, New Zealand
- Died: 8 January 2024 (aged 76) United Kingdom
- Height: 1.78 m (5 ft 10 in)
- Weight: 85 kg (187 lb)
- School: Dannevirke High School
- University: Lincoln College; Palmer College of Chiropractic
- Occupation: Chiropractor

Rugby union career
- Position: Three-quarter
Provincial / State sides
Years	Team	Apps	(Points)
1971–73	Canterbury	26	
1974	Hawke's Bay	1	
1975–77	Manawatu	37	
International career
Years	Team	Apps	(Points)
1972	New Zealand Universities		
1972–73	New Zealand	4	(0)

Duncan Alister Hales (22 November 1947 – 8 January 2024) was a New Zealand rugby union player. A three-quarter, Hales represented Canterbury, Manawatu and, briefly, Hawke's Bay at a provincial level, and was a member of the New Zealand national side, the All Blacks, from 1972 to 1973. He played 27 matches for the All Blacks including four internationals.

After retiring from rugby, Hales studied in the United States to become a chiropractor. He died in the United Kingdom on 8 January 2024, at the age of 76.
