= Brian Cederwall =

New Zealand sportsman

- Born: 24 February 1952 (age 74) Christchurch
- Height: 1.80 m (5 ft 11 in)
- Weight: 80 kg (180 lb)
- School: Rongotai College
- Occupation: Teacher

Rugby union career
- Position: Fullback
Amateur team(s)
Years	Team	Apps	(Points)
- Athletic
Provincial / State sides
Years	Team	Apps	(Points)
1972 - 1983	Wellington	103	

Brian William Cederwall (born 24 February 1952, Christchurch, New Zealand) represented Wellington in rugby union between 1972 and 1983 playing 103 first class matches. Cederwall also played 52 first-class cricket matches for Wellington. He is the older brother of Grant Cederwall. He played four All Black trials also making the New Zealand juniors in 1973 and 1974. He now works as a teacher at St Patrick's College Kilbirnie in Wellington.
