= John Dougan =

- Born: John Patrick Dougan; 22 December 1946 Lower Hutt, New Zealand
- Died: 16 November 2006 (aged 59) Sydney, New South Wales, Australia
- Height: 1.71 m (5 ft 7 in)
- Weight: 76 kg (168 lb)
- School: St Bernard's College

Rugby union career
- Position: Rugby union positions First five-eight
Provincial / State sides
Years	Team	Apps	(Points)
1967, 1970–77	Wellington		
1968–69	Hawke's Bay		
International career
Years	Team	Apps	(Points)
1972–73	New Zealand	2	(4)

John Patrick Dougan (22 December 1946 – 16 November 2006) was a New Zealand rugby union player. A first five-eighth, Dougan represented Wellington and Hawke's Bay at a provincial level, and was a member of the New Zealand national side, the All Blacks, from 1972 to 1973. He played 12 matches for the All Blacks including two internationals.
