= Andy Jefferd =

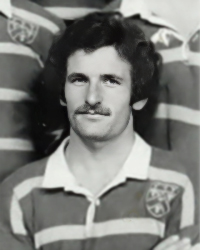
- Jefferd in 1975
- Born: Andrew Charles Reeves Jefferd; 13 June 1953 (age 73) Gisborne, New Zealand
- Height: 1.80 m (5 ft 11 in)
- Weight: 83 kg (183 lb)
- School: Wanganui Collegiate School
- University: Lincoln College
- Occupation: Farmer

Rugby union career
- Position: Second five-eighth
Provincial / State sides
Years	Team	Apps	(Points)
1974–1978	Canterbury	36	(67)
1978–1981	East Coast	32	(16)
International career
Years	Team	Apps	(Points)
1980–1981	New Zealand	3	(0)

Andrew Charles Reeves Jefferd (born 13 June 1953) is a former New Zealand rugby union player. Predominantly a second five-eighth, Jefferd represented Canterbury and East Coast at a provincial level, and was a member of the New Zealand national side, the All Blacks, in 1980 and 1981. He played five matches for the All Blacks including three internationals.
