= Scott Cartwright =

New Zealand rugby union player

- Born: Scott Calvert Cartwright; 7 January 1954 (age 72) Christchurch, New Zealand
- Height: 1.78 m (5 ft 10 in)
- Weight: 70 kg (150 lb)
- School: St Andrew's College

Rugby union career
- Position: Wing
Provincial / State sides
Years	Team	Apps	(Points)
1973–79	Canterbury	30	(68)
International career
Years	Team	Apps	(Points)
1976	New Zealand	7	(28)

Scott Calvert Cartwright (born 7 January 1954) is a former New Zealand rugby union player. A wing, Cartwright represented Canterbury at a provincial level and was a member of the New Zealand national side, the All Blacks, on their 1976 tour of South America. He played seven matches and was the top try scorer for the team on that tour which included two matches against Argentina, but these were not given full test status.
