= John Callesen =

New Zealand rugby union player

- Born: John Arthur Callesen; 24 May 1950 (age 76) Palmerston North, New Zealand
- Height: 1.96 m (6 ft 5 in)
- Weight: 98 kg (216 lb)
- School: Nelson College
- Occupation: Farmer

Rugby union career
- Position: Lock
Provincial / State sides
Years	Team	Apps	(Points)
1970–78	Manawatu		
International career
Years	Team	Apps	(Points)
1974–76	New Zealand	4	(0)

John Arthur Callesen (born 24 May 1950) is a former New Zealand rugby union player who played four test matches for the All Blacks in 1974 and 1975.
