= John Brake (rugby union, born 1952) =

- Born: Leonard John Brake; 3 July 1952 (age 74) Rotorua, New Zealand
- Height: 1.783 m (5 ft 10 in)
- Weight: 71 kg (157 lb)
- School: Western Heights High School

Rugby union career
- Position: First five-eighth
Provincial / State sides
Years	Team	Apps	(Points)
1973–81	Bay of Plenty		
International career
Years	Team	Apps	(Points)
1976	New Zealand	0	(0)
Coaching career
- Years: Team
- 1989–91: Bay of Plenty

Leonard John Brake was a New Zealand rugby union player and coach. A first five-eighth, Brake represented Bay of Plenty at a provincial level, and was a member of the New Zealand national side, the All Blacks, on their 1976 tour of South America. He played five matches on that tour, but did not appear in either of the unofficial tests against Argentina. He went on to be the Bay of Plenty selector–coach between 1989 and 1991.
