= Terry Morrison (rugby union) =

New Zealand rugby union player (1951–2021)

- Born: 16 June 1951 Hamilton, New Zealand
- Died: 24 December 2021 (aged 70) Maroochydore, Queensland, Australia
- Height: 1.78 m (5 ft 10 in)
- Weight: 82 kg (181 lb)
- School: Matamata College

Rugby union career
- Position: Wing
Provincial / State sides
| Years | Team | Apps | (Points) |
| 1972–73 | Otago | | |
International career
| Years | Team | Apps | (Points) |
| 1973 | New Zealand | 1 | (0) |

Terry Geoffrey Morrison (16 June 1951 – 24 December 2021) was a New Zealand rugby union player. A wing, Morrison represented Otago at a provincial level, and was a member of the New Zealand national side, the All Blacks, in 1973. He played four matches for the All Blacks including one international. He was the New Zealand 200 m champion in 1976, with a time of 21.95 s. Morrison died from a heart attack on 24 December 2021, at the age of 70.
