= Okara Park =

Stadium in Whangārei, New Zealand

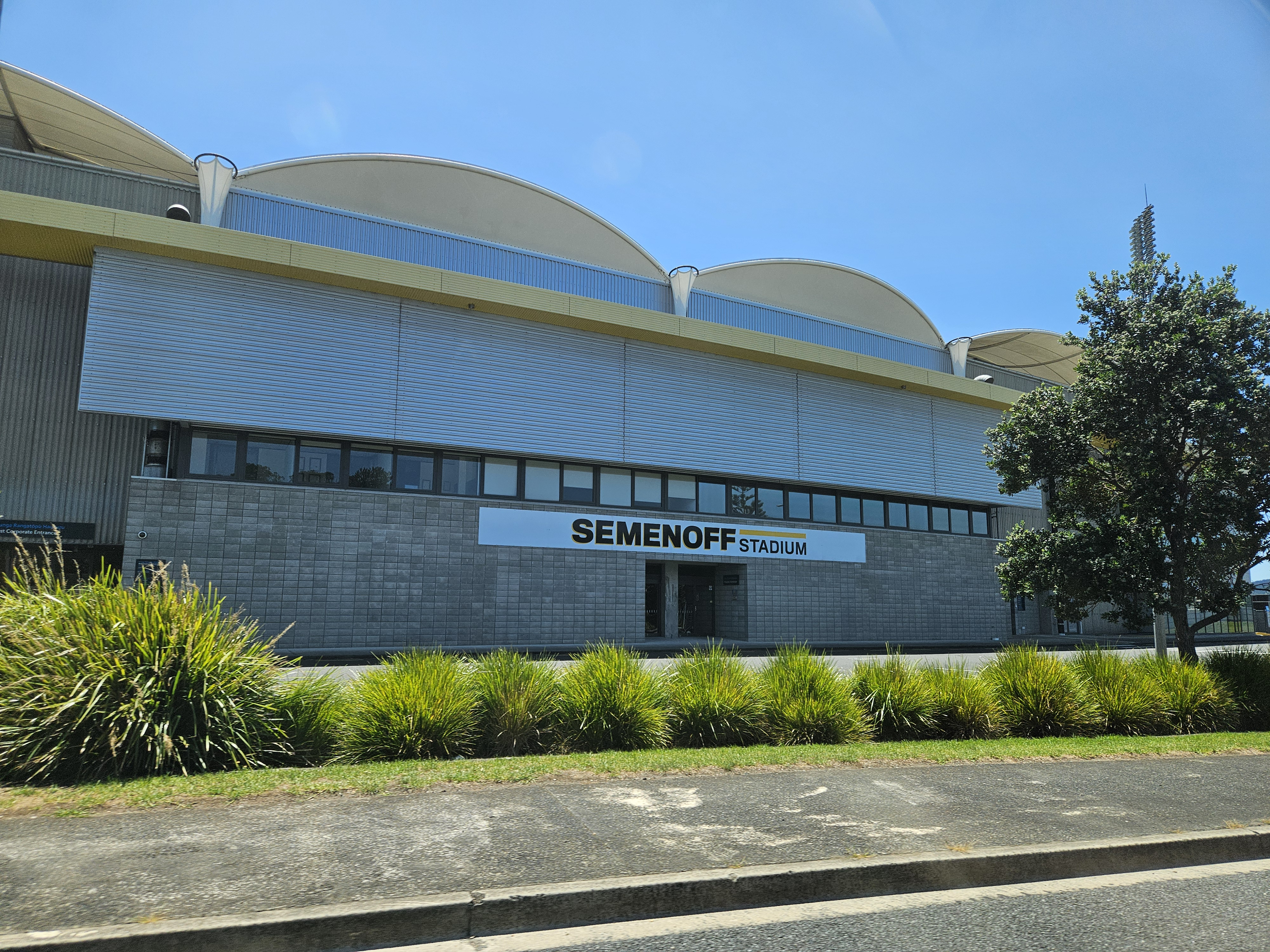
- Interactive map of Okara Park
- Location: Whangārei, New Zealand
- Coordinates: 35°44′3″S 174°19′46″E
- Capacity: 18,500
- Surface: Grass

Construction
- Opened: May 22, 1965
- Renovated: 2008

Tenants
- Northland Rugby Union (1965–present); Northern Swords

Okara Park, currently known commercially as Semenoff Stadium (previously known as Toll Stadium due to a sponsorship agreement) is a multi-purpose stadium in Whangārei, New Zealand. It is currently used mostly for rugby union matches and is the home stadium of Northland Rugby Union. The stadium is able to hold 18,500 people and was built in 1965.

The park has recently had a $16m redevelopment with the new grandstand known as the Northland Events Centre being built. The new development has turned Okara Park into a multi-purpose Northland sports hub.

Despite Okara Park only having a capacity for 18,500 people at a stretch, there was a match of Rugby Union in 1979 where around 40,000 people crammed into the stadium thanks to its large embankment. The occasion for this record crowd was the defence by the local side, North Auckland, of the prized Ranfurly Shield against Auckland.

The stadium has held national games, including the New Zealand Māori rugby league team beating the Great Britain Lions 40–28 in 1996 and the New Zealand Māori rugby union team beating the Tongan national side 66–7 at Okara Park in 1998. It has also hosted matches between Northland and touring international sides such as the British & Irish Lions, and Tonga, Samoa and Fiji in the last two decades.

In 2010, Okara Park hosted a match of the New Zealand Maori Rugby centenary series, with New Zealand Māori playing the New Zealand Barbarians in what was effectively an All Blacks trial match.

The stadium was used as a venue for the 2011 Rugby World Cup. The stadium hosted two group stage matches, Tonga vs. Canada and Tonga vs. Japan.

On 1 November 2014, the stadium hosted its first rugby league international when New Zealand played Samoa as part of the 2014 Rugby League Four Nations. New Zealand won the match 14–12.

On 3 June 2017, the 2017 British & Irish Lions began their tour here with a 13–7 win against New Zealand Barbarians.
