= Doug Rollerson =

NZ international rugby union & league player (1953-2017)

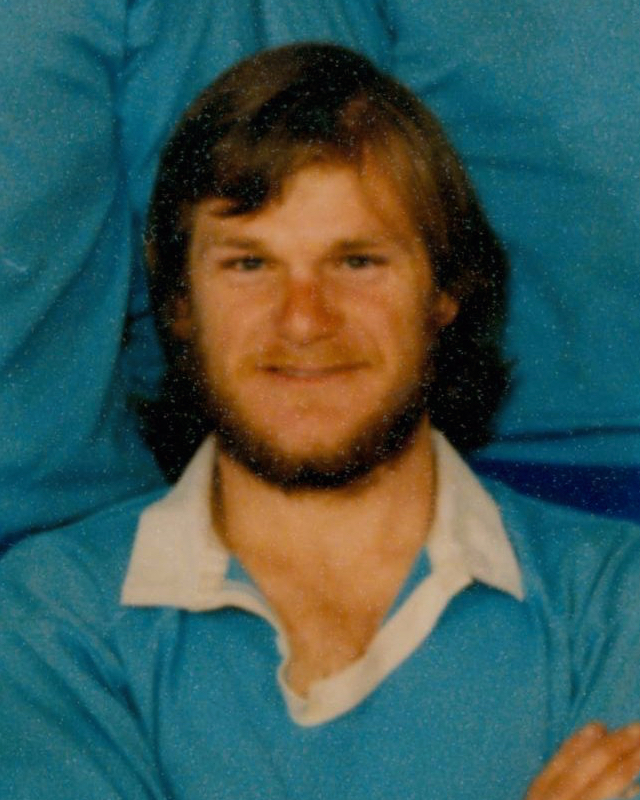
- Rollerson in 1978
- Born: Douglas Leslie Rollerson; 14 May 1953 Papakura, New Zealand
- Died: 3 May 2017 (aged 63) Auckland, New Zealand
- Height: 1.75 m (5 ft 9 in)
- Weight: 82 kg (181 lb)
- School: Wesley College
- University: Massey University

Rugby union career
- Position(s): First five-eighth Fullback
Provincial / State sides
Years	Team	Apps	(Points)
1972–77, 80–81	Manawatu		(515)
1979–80	Middlesex	3	
International career
Years	Team	Apps	(Points)
1973–77	NZ Universities		
1976, 1980–81	New Zealand	8	(24)
- Rugby league career

Playing information
- Position: Fullback
Club
Years	Team	Pld	T	G	FG	P
1982–83	North Sydney

Douglas Leslie Rollerson (14 May 1953 – 3 May 2017) was a New Zealand rugby union and rugby league player, and rugby union executive.

== Rugby union ==
Primarily a fullback and first five-eighth, Rollerson represented Manawatu at a provincial level, and was a member of the New Zealand national side, the All Blacks, in 1976, 1980 and 1981.

He played 24 matches for the All Blacks including eight full internationals.

Rollerson played for Manawatu in their 16–22 loss to the Irish team of 1976. He did not score as the Freyberg Old Boys winger Sheridan Murphy did the goal kicking that day.

Against the 1977 British Lions Doug scored 3 penalties for Manawatu-Horowhenua in their 12–18 loss and 1 conversion and 3 penalties for the New Zealand Universities team in their 21–9 victory. He did not play for the All Blacks in that series.

Rollerson was called in to replace an injured Eddie Dunn at first five-eighth for the second test against the 1981 Scottish team which the All Blacks won comprehensively by 40–15. He then played for Manawatu in their 19–31 loss against the 1981 Springboks, scoring 1 conversion and 3 penalties. Manawatu led for the first hour of the match and according to Chester and McMillan “Manawatu’s hero was Rollerson, who pressured Botha all day. His quick thinking led to Manawatu’s first try.”. Rollerson was selected as first five-eighth in all three tests against the Springboks and over the series scored a try (in the first test), 2 conversions, 1 penalty and a dropped goal. He shared the goal kicking with Allan Hewson in the third test, Rollerson took the goal kicks from the left hand side and Hewson those on the right.

He later served as the chief executive of the North Harbour Rugby Union from December 1997 to March 2004.

== Rugby league ==
From 1982, Rollerson spent two seasons with the North Sydney Bears, playing fullback, mostly in reserve grade.

== Death ==
He died on 3 May 2017 from cancer.
