= John Pring =

New Zealand rugby union referee

John Pring MBE
- Born: John Pym Gray Pring; 30 December 1927 Auckland, New Zealand
- Died: 10 March 2014 (aged 86) Northcote, Auckland, New Zealand
- Occupation: Bank manager

Rugby union career
Refereeing career
Years	Competition	Apps
- British & Irish Lions tours

John Pym Gray Pring MBE (30 December 1927 – 10 March 2014) was a New Zealand rugby union referee. His refereeing career spanned 40 years, and included controlling all four test matches between the All Blacks and the British Lions on their 1971 tour to New Zealand. He was the first, and so far only, person to referee every test match in a Lions series.

In the 1979 Queen's Birthday Honours, Pring was appointed a Member of the Order of the British Empire, for services to rugby refereeing.

Pring died in the Auckland suburb of Northcote on 10 March 2014. His wife, Kathleen, died in 2021.
