= Richard Cox (New Zealand athlete) =

New Zealand cricketer (born 1951)

- Born: Richard Dawson Cox; 1 May 1951 (age 75) Waipawa, New Zealand

Rugby union career
- Position: Fullback
Provincial / State sides
Years	Team	Apps	(Points)
1976–1977	Hawke's Bay	21	(177)
- Cricket career

Cricket information
- Batting: Right-handed
- Bowling: Right-arm medium

Domestic team information
- Years: Team
- 1971/72–1975/76: Central Districts
- Source: Cricinfo, 29 October 2020

Richard Dawson Cox (born 1 May 1951) is a New Zealand cricketer. He played in one first-class and one List A match for Central Districts in 1971/72 and 1975/76.

He also played representative rugby for Hawke's Bay. He played two seasons as fullback in the 1976 and 1977 National Provincial Championship. A goal kicker, in 21 games he scored 177 points.

== See also ==
- List of Central Districts representative cricketers
