= Murray Watts (rugby union) =

New Zealand rugby player (born 1955)

- Born: Murray Gordon Watts; 31 March 1955 (age 71) Pātea, New Zealand
- Height: 1.80 m (5 ft 11 in)
- Weight: 82 kg (181 lb)
- Occupation: School teacher

Rugby union career
- Position: Wing three-quarter
Provincial / State sides
Years	Team	Apps	(Points)
1975–77	Manawatu	31	(48)
1978–85	Taranaki	123	(220)
International career
Years	Team	Apps	(Points)
1979–80	New Zealand	5	(4)

Murray Gordon Watts (born 31 March 1955) is a former New Zealand rugby union player. A wing three-quarter, Watts represented Manawatu and Taranaki at a provincial level, playing over 150 games for those two provinces. He was a member of the New Zealand national side, the All Blacks, between 1979 and 1980, appearing in 13 matches including five internationals. In all he scored seven tries for the All Blacks.
