= Kenneth Granger =

Ken Granger
- Born: Kenneth William Granger; 20 March 1951 Wellington, New Zealand
- Height: 1.80 m (5 ft 11 in)
- Weight: 82 kg (181 lb)
- School: Queen Charlotte College; Freyberg High School

Rugby union career
- Position: Wing three-quarter
Amateur team(s)
Years	Team	Apps	(Points)
1979–81	Harlequins		
Provincial / State sides
Years	Team	Apps	(Points)
1971–84	Manawatu	128	
International career
Years	Team	Apps	(Points)
1976	New Zealand	0	(0)

Kenneth William Granger (born 20 March 1951) is a former New Zealand rugby union player. A wing three-quarter, Granger represented Manawatu at a provincial level between 1971 and 1984, playing 128 matches and scoring 66 tries. He was a member of the New Zealand national side, the All Blacks, on their 1976 tour of South America. He scored five tries in his six matches on that tour, including the international against Uruguay for which the New Zealand Rugby Union did not award test caps.
