= Arena Manawatu =

Stadium in New Zealand

Central Energy Trust Arena
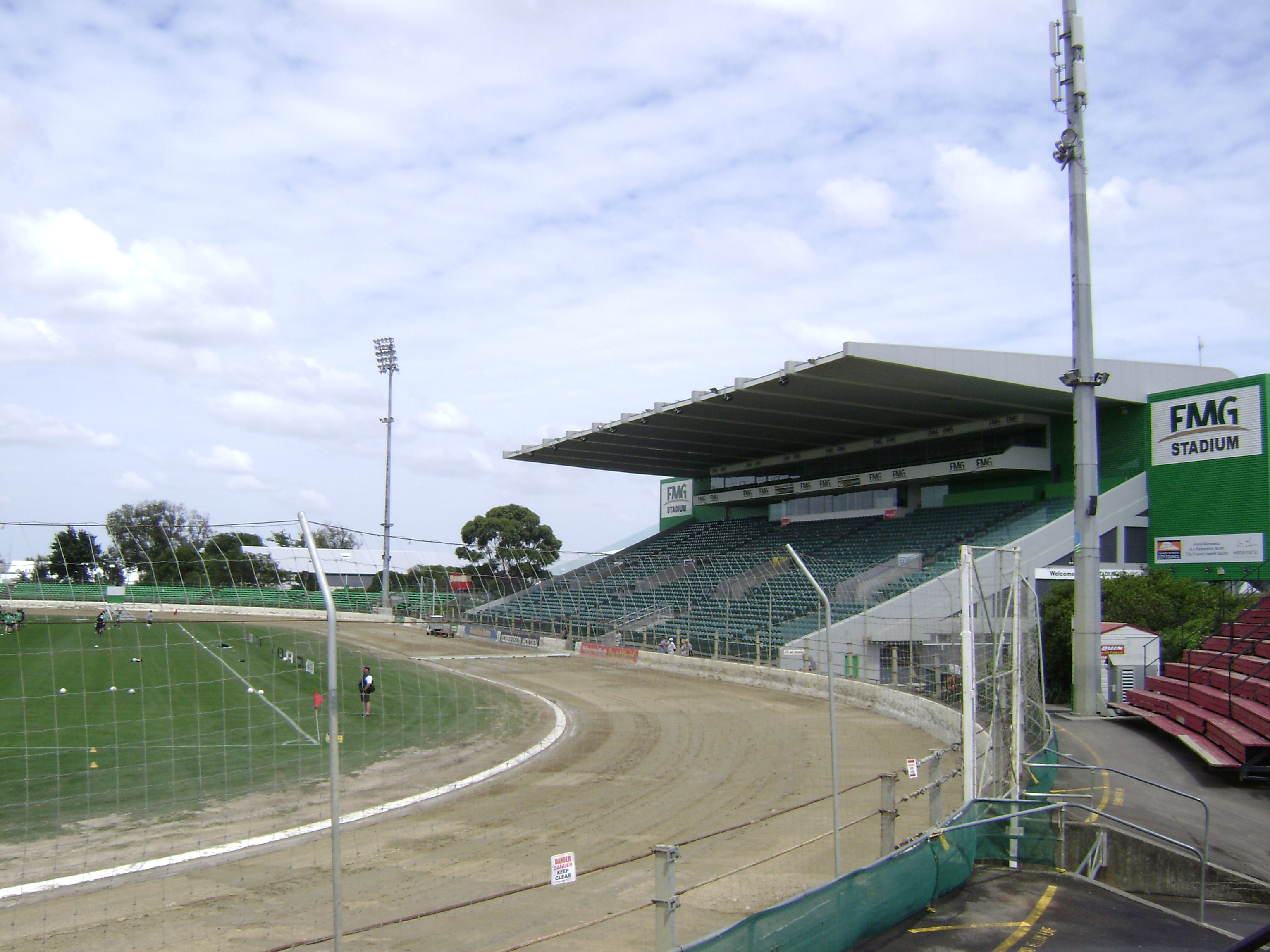
- Interactive map of Central Energy Trust Arena
- Former names: Palmerston North Showgrounds, Manawatu Sports Stadium, Arena Manawatu, FMG Stadium
- Location: Palmerston North Central, Manawatū-Whanganui, New Zealand
- Coordinates: 40°21′24″S 175°36′4″E
- Owner: Palmerston North City Council
- Capacity: 15,000 (Arena 1); 5,000 (Arena 2); 2,000 (Arena 3)

Construction
- Opened: July 1886
- Renovated: March 2005
- Rebuilt: April 1981

Tenants
- Hurricanes; Manawatu Turbos; Robertson Prestige International Speedway; Wellington Phoenix; Manawatu rugby league team

Central Energy Trust Arena is the current name of the 180,000 square meter publicly owned recreational complex just west of the Palmerston North city centre in the Manawatū-Whanganui region of New Zealand.

It has three linked indoor stadiums with movable tiered seating. Outdoor facilities include football fields and a speedway track with a grandstand.

In June 2015, FMG Insurance chose not to renew the sponsorship deal for the main stadium name.

== History ==
Originally founded in 1886 as the Palmerston North Showgrounds, its pavilion burnt down in a fire in 1977. It was replaced with a new stand, and the ground was reopened in 1981 as the Manawatu Sports Stadium. Since 1973 it has been owned by the Palmerston North City Council.

== Arena 1: Central Energy Trust Arena ==
=== Capacity ===
Central Energy Trust Arena has a capacity of 15,000. Temporary seating is added for major events, allowing the capacity to reach 20,000.

Central Energy Trust Arena is home to Manawatu Rugby. It is the home ground of the Manawatu Turbos, and also generally hosts one club game per week. Playing in the Air New Zealand Cup, crowd attendances at Turbos' games have been among the highest in the competition, averaging 7,000 per game.

=== History ===
Central Energy Trust Arena was formerly known as Arena 1 and FMG Stadium. It was the venue for the first ever Super 12 rugby match in 1996, which was played by the Wellington Hurricanes and the Auckland Blues.

The stadium was the host of the 1987 Rugby World Cup game between Wales and Tonga on 29 May. Wales won 29–16.

The ground was a venue for the British & Irish Lions on the 2005 British & Irish Lions tour to New Zealand with a game against Manawatu Turbos on 28 June.

On 28 March 2009, The Highlanders played a Super Rugby 'home' game at Central Energy Trust Arena against the Bulls. The game attracted a large crowd of over 10,000—one of the Highlanders' biggest of the 2009 season.

On 4 September 2011, The Manawatu Turbos hosted the Hawkes Bay Magpies in the ITM Championship Cup Final at Central Energy Trust Arena. Crowd attendance was 13,100.

The stadium hosted two pool games in the 2011 Rugby World Cup, in which New Zealand was the host nation. With the city's central location, large student population, the stadium's close proximity to the CBD, International Pacific College, as well as the New Zealand Rugby Institute (a facility which the All Blacks used to use), the idea of basing a team and having a pool game in Palmerston North was attractive.

On 18 March 2016, The Hurricanes played another Super Rugby 'home' game at Central Energy Trust Arena against the Western Force. The game attracted a crowd of over 8,000.

=== Rugby league ===
The stadium hosted its first rugby league test match when New Zealand lost to Great Britain 11–10 on 24 June 1990 in front of 8,073 fans.

The stadium hosted New Zealand Kiwis' victory in their first rugby league test of the 1992 Great Britain Lions tour of Australia and New Zealand. In front of 11,548 fans, the Kiwis defeated Great Britain 15-14 after a late Daryl Halligan field goal.

Palmerston North also hosted the second game of the 1993 Trans-Tasman series against Australia, played on a water-logged ground after constant rain. Despite the arctic like conditions, an overflow crowd of 19,000 hardy fans saw the Mal Meninga led Aussies run out 16-8 winners.

Overall, the stadium hosted six test matches between 1990 and 1996. Its last test to date saw New Zealand defeat Great Britain 18–15 on 25 October 1996 in front of 12,000 fans.

Rugby league Test matches

List of Test matches played at Palmerston North.

Game#	Date	Result	Attendance	Notes
1	24 June 1990	Great Britain def. New Zealand 11-10	8,073	1990 New Zealand vs Great Britain series
2	12 July 1992	New Zealand def. Great Britain 15-14	11,548	1992 New Zealand vs Great Britain series
3	25 June 1993	Australia def. New Zealand 16-8	19,500	1993 Trans-Tasman Test series
4	16 June 1995	New Zealand drew with France 16-16	10,846	1995 New Zealand vs France series
5	11 October 1996	New Zealand def. Papua New Guinea 64-0	2,000	1996 New Zealand vs Papua New Guinea series
6	25 October 1996	New Zealand def. Great Britain 18-15	12,000	1996 New Zealand vs Great Britain series

=== Motorcycle speedway ===
The site has been used as a motorcycle speedway venue for many years. Originally known as Palmerston North Showgrounds speedway track, it hosted several important events, including a qualifying round of the Speedway World Championship in 1976, and the New Zealand Solo Championship in 1949, 1962, 1963, 1969 and 1975.

Today it is called the Robertson Holden International Speedway, with a 434 metres (475 yards) track encircling the field. The national Teams Championships have been held there, early February, bringing racers from all over the country. The season starts mid-October and finishes by the start of May.

=== Other sports ===
The YoungHeart Manawatu association football team used to play at the ground, however they have since moved to Memorial Park, Palmerston North.

Central Energy Trust Arena hosted the Wellington Phoenix association football team in a home game against Sydney FC on 12 December 2009 in the Hyundai A-League.

Central Energy Trust Arena was twice host of Te Matatini nationwide Kapa haka competition.

== Arena 2 ==
Redeveloped in 2004, Arena 2 is a multipurpose indoor sporting facility, capable of holding exhibitions, conventions, and entertainment events. It has been the host of the Central Pulse home matches in Palmerston North and International netball fixtures between New Zealand and Australia; international motor shows; conferences and houses the home court to the Manawatu Jets who play in the New Zealand National Basketball League. The arena has also played host to international basketball, hosting the New Zealand Tall Blacks on occasions, including the FIBA Oceania Championship. For sponsorship reasons, the arena is known as the Fly Palmy Arena.

== Arenas 3, 5, and 6 ==
Arena 3 has a floor area of 2100 square metres and is an indoor sports centre. It has a capacity of 2,000 persons.

Arena 5 includes Bell Hall, Barber Hall, Waldegrave Lounge and gym.

Arena 6 has the Outdoor No. 2, 3 & 4 sports grounds.

== B&M Centre ==
The B&M Centre is a multipurpose indoor stadium.

== Military use ==
The Palmerston North Showgrounds have had a long military association, which saw it recognised as a Place of Remembrance by the Palmerston North City Council and the New Zealand Poppy Places Trust in 2019.

From the early 1900s, the Palmerston North Showgrounds was the venue for various Military Tournaments, with Boxing Day Military displays popular with the local community. Examples of Military Tournaments held at the Palmerston North Showgrounds were:

- 2 February 1901, the Imperial Representative Corps paraded in The Square with the Manawatu Mounted Rifles and the Palmerston North Rifles. The parade concluded at the Showgrounds with military displays.
- 9 November 1908, The Wellington Engineer Volunteers participated in a Military Tournament at the show grounds, where they engaged in an improvised bridge-building display.
- 3 January 1911, a large Naval and Military Tournament took place at the Palmerston North Showgrounds with crowds numbering 7,000 to 8,000.

During the 1st World War, the showgrounds were used as a remount depot for the New Zealand Mounted Rifles and as a stop-over location for men passing through Palmerston North as they transited to other various military camps around New Zealand.

On 19 July 1919, the showgrounds were the venue for Palmerston Norths celebrations marking the end of World War One. After a parade around the Square followed by speeches watched by a crowd of about 7,000 including 800 children from all the local schools.

During the Second World War, the Showgrounds were requisitioned for military use for the duration of the war by the New Zealand Army, and was by the following units:

- The 28th (Māori) Battalion was formed at the Showgrounds on 25 January 1940, and after initial training for three months en-trained at the Palmerston North Railway Station on 2 May 1940 for overseas service,
- The Manawatu Mounted Rifles,
- Headquarters 2 Brigade,
- Headquarters 4 Division,
- No 2 Company, New Zealand Army Service Corps, and
- No 2 Ordnance Sub Depot, New Zealand Army Ordnance Corps from 1942 to 1945.

On 31 December 1944 a large fire occurred in the building occupied by Ordnance Depot, destroying Halls 1, 2, and 3 and causing stock losses of £225,700 ($18,639,824.86 at 2018 value).
