= Bevan Wilson (rugby union, born 1956) =

NZ international rugby union player

- Born: Bevan William Wilson; 22 March 1956 (age 70) Dunstan, New Zealand
- Height: 1.85 m (6 ft 1 in)
- Weight: 82 kg (181 lb)
- School: Dunstan High School
- Occupation: Farmer

Rugby union career
- Position: Full-back
Provincial / State sides
Years	Team	Apps	(Points)
1975–79	Otago	51	
International career
Years	Team	Apps	(Points)
1977–79	New Zealand	8	(55)

Bevan William Wilson (born 22 March 1956) is a former New Zealand rugby union player. A full-back, Wilson represented Otago at a provincial level, and was a member of the New Zealand national side, the All Blacks, from 1977 to 1979. He played 12 matches for the All Blacks including eight internationals.
