= Bob Lendrum =

- Born: Robert Noel Lendrum; 22 March 1948 (age 78) Waiuku, New Zealand
- Height: 1.80 m (5 ft 11 in)
- Weight: 81 kg (179 lb)
- School: Papakura High School

Rugby union career
- Position: Fullback
Provincial / State sides
Years	Team	Apps	(Points)
1968–79	Counties	>100	
International career
Years	Team	Apps	(Points)
1973	New Zealand	1	(2)

Robert Noel Lendrum (born 22 March 1948) is a former New Zealand rugby union player. A fullback, Lendrum represented Counties at a provincial level, and was a member of the New Zealand national side, the All Blacks, in 1973. He played three matches for the All Blacks including one international. He was briefly coach of the Counties team in 1995.
