= List of New Zealand national rugby union players =

As of 17 October 2026, 1243 players have played rugby union for New Zealand's national team, known since 1905 as the All Blacks. The first New Zealand representative match was played in May 1884 against a Wellington XV before the New Zealand team departed for their tour of New South Wales. This side predates the formation of the New Zealand Rugby Football Union (now New Zealand Rugby), which was not established until 1892. Still, it is nevertheless recognized as the first official New Zealand team. The first side contained fifteen players whose playing order as All Blacks have been determined alphabetically. Therefore, the first All Black was James Allan, whilst the most recent is Chay Fihaki - All Black #1243.

== List ==
Notes on list:

- Total matches refers to all matches that the player has played for New Zealand, regardless of whether they are classified as test matches
- Test caps refers to the number of test matches in which the player participated. Only games recognized as test matches by New Zealand Rugby are included in the figures listed here.
- Province refers to the player's province from when they made their international debut.

Number	Name	Year of debut	Total matches	Test caps	Total points	Test points	Province
1	James Allan	1884	8	0	6	0	Otago
2	Henry Braddon	1884	7	0	0	0	Otago
3	George Carter	1884	7	0	0	0	Auckland
4	John Dumbell	1884	5	0	9	0	Wellington
5	George Helmore	1884	7	0	16	0	Canterbury
6	John Lecky	1884	7	0	8	0	Auckland
7	William Millton	1884	8	0	35	0	Canterbury
8	Timothy O'Connor	1884	7	0	2	0	Auckland
9	James O'Donnell	1884	7	0	8	0	Canterbury
10	Henry Roberts	1884	7	0	8	0	Wellington
11	George Robertson	1884	8	0	8	0	Otago
12	Thomas Ryan	1884	9	0	35	0	Auckland
13	John Taiaroa	1884	9	0	21	0	Otago
14	Hart Udy	1884	8	0	0	0	Wellington
15	Peter Webb	1884	8	0	2	0	Wellington
16	Edward Millton	1884	7	0	2	0	Canterbury
17	Joe Warbrick	1884	7	0	12	0	Auckland
18	Robert Wilson	1884	6	0	2	0	Canterbury
19	Edwin Davy	1884	3	0	2	0	Wellington
20	Henry Butland	1893	9	0	9	0	West Coast
21	Sam Cockroft	1893	12	0	3	0	Manawatu
22	Archibald D'Arcy	1893	7	0	0	0	Wairarapa
23	Thomas Ellison	1893	7	0	23	0	Wellington
24	David Gage	1893	8	0	6	0	Wellington
25	John Gardner	1893	4	0	0	0	South Canterbury
26	Francis Jervis	1893	10	0	38	0	Auckland
27	James Lambie	1893	12	0	12	0	Taranaki
28	William McKenzie	1893	20	0	23	0	Wellington
29	Frederick Murray	1893	20	0	16	0	Auckland
30	Walter Pringle	1893	5	0	0	0	Wellington
31	Graham Shannon	1893	6	0	9	0	Manawatu
32	Charles Speight	1893	7	0	3	0	Auckland
33	Hoeroa Tiopira	1893	8	0	0	0	Hawke's Bay
34	Tabby Wynyard	1893	7	0	14	0	Wellington
35	Alfred Bayly	1893	20	0	20	0	Taranaki
36	Maurice Herrold	1893	2	0	0	0	Auckland
37	John Mowlem	1893	4	0	0	0	Manawatu
38	Angus Stuart	1893	7	0	0	0	Wellington
39	Charles Macintosh	1893	4	0	0	0	South Canterbury
40	Henry Wilson	1893	7	0	12	0	Manawatu
41	George Harper	1893	3	0	7	0	Nelson
42	Alan Good	1893	4	0	0	0	Taranaki
43	Rod Gray	1893	2	0	0	0	Wairarapa
44	Robert McKenzie	1893	2	0	0	0	Auckland
45	Robert Oliphant	1893	3	0	3	0	Wellington
46	Billy Watson	1893	3	0	0	0	Wairarapa
47	William Balch	1894	1	0	0	0	Canterbury
48	Walter Bayly	1894	1	0	0	0	Taranaki
49	Alfred Cooke	1894	1	0	0	0	Canterbury
50	Hugh Good	1894	1	0	0	0	Taranaki
51	Daniel Hughes	1894	1	0	0	0	Taranaki
52	George Humphreys	1894	1	0	3	0	Canterbury
53	George Maber	1894	1	0	0	0	Wellington
54	Dick Stewart	1894	1	0	0	0	South Canterbury
55	John Swindley	1894	1	0	0	0	Wellington
56	Lewis Allen	1896	13	0	29	0	Taranaki
57	Harry Frost	1896	1	0	0	0	Canterbury
58	Sandy Kerr	1896	1	0	3	0	Canterbury
59	Peter McDonnell	1896	1	0	0	0	Wanganui
60	Nisbet McRobie	1896	1	0	0	0	Southland
61	Sydney Orchard	1896	8	0	0	0	Canterbury
62	Tom Pauling	1896	9	0	18	0	Wellington
63	William Roberts	1896	8	0	12	0	Wellington
64	Frank Surman	1896	1	0	0	0	Auckland
65	Donald Watson	1896	1	0	0	0	Taranaki
66	Francis Young	1896	1	0	0	0	Wellington
67	John Blair	1897	9	0	5	0	Wanganui
68	Joseph Calnan	1897	9	0	8	0	Wellington
69	Jimmy Duncan	1897	10	1	9	0	Otago
70	Robert Handcock	1897	8	0	9	0	Auckland
71	Bill Hardcastle	1897	7	0	3	0	Wellington
72	William Harris	1897	9	0	0	0	Otago
73	Arthur Humphries	1897	15	0	45	0	Taranaki
74	George William Smith	1897	39	2	102	6	Auckland
75	Bill Wells	1897	7	0	0	0	Taranaki
76	Barney Armit	1897	9	0	21	0	Otago
77	Frank Brooker	1897	4	0	0	0	Canterbury
78	Ernest Glennie	1897	6	0	12	0	Canterbury
79	Alex Wilson	1897	8	0	14	0	Auckland
80	Hugh Mills	1897	8	0	12	0	Taranaki
81	John Burt	1901	1	0	0	0	Otago
82	Bill Cunningham	1901	39	9	22	3	Auckland
83	Ernie Dodd	1901	3	1	0	0	Wellington
84	William Hay-MacKenzie	1901	2	0	0	0	Auckland
85	Phil Jacob	1901	2	0	6	0	Southland
86	Dick McGregor	1901	10	2	12	3	Auckland
87	John O'Brien	1901	1	0	0	0	Wellington
88	Bernard O'Dowda	1901	2	0	0	0	Taranaki
89	Charles Purdue	1901	3	1	0	0	Southland
90	Dan Udy	1901	9	1	3	0	Wairarapa
91	Morrie Wood	1901	12	2	34	0	Wellington
92	Tom Cross	1901	3	2	3	3	Canterbury
93	Walter Drake	1901	1	0	0	0	Canterbury
94	Loftus Armstrong	1903	5	0	3	0	Wairarapa
95	Albert Asher	1903	11	1	51	3	Auckland
96	Reuben Cooke	1903	10	1	3	0	Canterbury
97	Dave Gallaher	1903	36	6	14	0	Auckland
98	Fred Given	1903	9	0	3	0	Otago
99	Henry Kiernan	1903	8	1	9	0	Auckland
100	Paddy Long	1903	10	1	12	0	Auckland
101	Duncan McGregor	1903	31	4	106	18	Canterbury
102	Archie McMinn	1903	10	2	9	6	Wairarapa
103	George Nicholson	1903	39	4	24	0	Auckland
104	John Stalker	1903	6	0	6	0	Otago
105	Billy Stead	1903	42	7	36	0	Southland
106	George Tyler	1903	36	7	27	5	Auckland
107	Billy Wallace	1903	51	11	379	50	Wellington
108	Bernard Fanning	1903	9	2	0	0	Canterbury
109	Harry Porteous	1903	3	0	0	0	Otago
110	John Spencer	1903	6	2	6	0	Wellington
111	Billy Glenn	1904	19	2	0	0	Taranaki
112	Eric Harper	1904	11	2	24	6	Canterbury
113	Patrick Harvey	1904	1	1	0	0	Canterbury
114	Paddy McMinn	1904	1	1	0	0	
115	Charlie Seeling	1904	39	11	33	6	
116	Steve Casey	1905	38	8	0	0	
117	Frank Glasgow	1905	35	6	43	9	
118	Jimmy Hunter	1905	36	11	144	15	
119	Massa Johnston	1905	27	3	12	0	
120	Simon Mynott	1905	39	8	58	0	
121	Fred Newton	1905	19	3	3	3	
122	Jimmie O'Sullivan	1905	29	5	6	0	
123	Fred Roberts	1905	52	12	72	11	
124	Hector Thomson	1905	15	1	50	3	
125	John Corbett	1905	16	0	0	0	
126	George Gillett	1905	38	8	41	7	
127	Ernie Booth	1905	24	3	19	0	
128	Alex McDonald	1905	40	7	50	11	
129	Bob Deans	1905	24	5	63	9	
130	Harold Abbott	1905	11	1	47	8	
131	William Mackrell	1905	7	1	3	0	
132	Bob Bennet	1905	1	1	0	0	
133	George Burgess	1905	1	1	0	0	
134	Arthur Francis	1905	18	10	31	16	
135	Colin Gilray	1905	1	1	0	0	
136	Donald Macpherson	1905	1	1	0	0	
137	Pat Purdue	1905	1	1	0	0	
138	William Smith	1905	1	1	0	0	
139	Hubert Turtill	1905	1	1	0	0	
140	Eric Watkins	1905	1	1	0	0	
141	Edgar Wrigley	1905	1	1	3	3	
142	Jack Colman	1907	6	4	8	2	
143	Frank Fryer	1907	9	4	33	0	
144	Ned Hughes	1907	9	6	3	3	
145	Frank Mitchinson	1907	31	11	80	32	
146	George Spencer	1907	5	0	6	0	
147	Alfred Eckhold	1907	3	0	0	0	
148	Harry Paton	1907	8	2	18	3	
149	John Hogan	1907	2	0	0	0	
150	Donald Cameron	1908	3	3	3	3	
151	Ranji Wilson	1908	21	10	18	6	
152	Paddy Burns	1908	9	5	15	6	
153	Doddy Gray	1908	14	3	12	9	
154	Donald Cameron Hamilton	1908	1	1	0	0	
155	Peter Murray	1908	1	1	0	0	
156	Sandy Paterson	1908	9	5	6	3	
157	Bill Reedy	1908	2	2	0	0	
158	Harold Hayward	1908	1	1	3	3	
159	Sam Bligh	1910	5	0	0	0	
160	Alf Budd	1910	3	0	0	0	
161	David Evans	1910	4	1	3	0	
162	William Fuller	1910	6	2	15	3	
163	Joe O'Leary	1910	8	4	33	16	
164	Jimmy Ridland	1910	6	3	0	0	
165	Jack Stohr	1910	15	3	73	6	
166	Frank Wilson	1910	2	0	4	0	
167	Gerald McKellar	1910	5	3	3	0	
168	James Maguire	1910	6	3	0	0	
169	James Ryan	1910	15	4	20	0	
170	Henry Avery	1910	6	3	0	0	
171	Billy Mitchell	1910	5	2	6	3	
172	Fred Ivimey	1910	1	0	0	0	
173	Harry Atkinson	1913	10	1	3	0	
174	John Cuthill	1913	16	2	31	0	
175	Henry Dewar	1913	16	2	3	0	
176	Albert Downing	1913	26	5	21	0	
177	Tom Lynch	1913	23	4	113	12	
178	Dougie McGregor	1913	11	2	45	3	
179	Jock McKenzie	1913	20	4	57	15	
180	Toby Murray	1913	22	4	36	9	
181	Dick Roberts	1913	23	5	102	29	
182	George Sellars	1913	15	2	6	0	
183	Henry Taylor	1913	23	5	60	12	
184	Peter Williams	1913	9	1	3	0	
185	Jim Wylie	1913	12	2	18	3	
186	Alex Bruce	1913	10	2	9	0	
187	Mick Cain	1913	24	4	17	0	
188	James Douglas	1913	9	0	24	0	
189	James Graham	1913	19	3	76	10	
190	Jim Baird	1913	1	1	0	0	
191	Jim Barrett	1913	3	2	0	0	
192	Charles Brown	1913	11	2	8	3	
193	William Cummings	1913	3	2	3	3	
194	Bill Francis	1913	12	5	9	6	
195	Mac Geddes	1913	1	1	0	0	
196	Charles Gillespie	1913	1	1	0	0	
197	Edward Hasell	1913	7	2	21	3	
198	Victor Macky	1913	1	1	0	0	
199	Jim McNeece	1913	11	5	6	3	
200	Gus Spillane	1913	2	2	0	0	
201	James Stewart	1913	2	2	0	0	
202	Reg Taylor	1913	2	2	3	3	
203	Eric Cockroft	1913	7	3	7	0	
204	Alfred Fanning	1913	1	1	3	3	
205	James Tilyard	1913	10	1	20	0	
206	George Loveridge	1913	11	0	20	0	
207	Edward Roberts	1913	26	5	110	4	
208	Sal Irvine	1914	10	3	0	0	
209	Bill Lindsay	1914	4	0	3	0	
210	Jack O'Brien	1914	12	1	7	0	
211	Bobby Black	1914	6	1	9	0	
212	Tom Fisher	1914	5	0	3	0	
213	Lyn Weston	1914	1	0	0	0	
214	Beethoven Algar	1920	6	0	9	0	
215	Ces Badeley	1920	15	2	27	0	
216	David Baird	1920	9	0	17	0	
217	Alphonsus Carroll	1920	8	0	13	0	
218	Jim Donald	1920	22	2	18	0	
219	William Duncan	1920	11	3	3	0	
220	Hohepa Jacob	1920	8	0	25	0	
221	Charles McLean	1920	5	0	21	0	
222	Jim Moffitt	1920	12	3	14	0	
223	Jack Steel	1920	38	6	114	9	
224	Percy Storey	1920	12	2	50	3	
225	Alfred West	1920	24	2	20	0	
226	Moke Belliss	1920	20	3	27	3	
227	Vivian Wilson	1920	7	0	18	0	
228	Jack Shearer	1920	5	0	3	0	
229	George Aitken	1921	2	2	0	0	
230	Richard Fogarty	1921	2	2	0	0	
231	Charles Kingstone	1921	3	3	0	0	
232	Harry Nicholls	1921	7	1	3	0	
233	Mark Nicholls	1921	51	10	284	48	
234	Johnstone Richardson	1921	42	7	58	3	
235	Andrew White	1921	38	4	48	3	
236	Les McLean	1921	3	2	17	3	
237	Laurie Brownlie	1921	1	0	0	0	
238	Phillippe Cabot	1921	1	0	0	0	
239	Cyril Edward Evans	1921	1	0	0	0	
240	Charles Fletcher	1921	2	1	0	0	
241	Jockey Ford	1921	9	0	21	0	
242	Paul Markham	1921	1	0	0	0	
243	Lou Petersen	1921	8	0	3	0	
244	Eddie Ryan	1921	1	0	0	0	
245	Sydney Shearer	1921	8	0	3	0	
246	Jock Turnbull	1921	1	0	0	0	
247	Francis Ward	1921	1	0	0	0	
248	William Fea	1921	1	1	0	0	
249	Karl Ifwersen	1921	1	1	0	0	
250	Keith Siddells	1921	1	1	0	0	
251	Reginald Bell	1922	8	0	5	0	
252	Les Cupples	1922	29	2	18	0	
253	Charles Fitzgerald	1922	5	0	3	0	
254	Harold Masters	1922	4	0	0	0	
255	Robert Mathieson	1922	4	0	0	0	
256	Jim O'Brien	1922	3	0	3	0	
257	Frank Smyth	1922	3	0	3	0	
258	Kenneth Svenson	1922	34	4	94	12	
259	Len Williams	1922	9	0	3	0	
260	Vic Badeley	1922	5	0	13	0	
261	Maurice Brownlie	1922	61	8	63	6	
262	Umberto Calcinai	1922	5	0	0	0	
263	George Dickinson	1922	5	0	9	0	
264	Percy Hickey	1922	2	0	0	0	
265	Sam Gemmell	1923	1	0	0	0	
266	David McMeeking	1923	2	0	3	0	
267	Jimmy Mill	1923	33	4	53	0	
268	Waate Potaka	1923	2	0	3	0	
269	Len Righton	1923	9	0	9	0	
270	Jimmy Sinclair	1923	2	0	23	0	
271	Frank Snodgrass	1923	3	0	13	0	
272	Peina Taituha	1923	2	0	0	0	
273	Fred Tilyard	1923	1	0	3	0	
274	Joseph Bell	1923	1	0	0	0	
275	Quentin Donald	1923	23	4	18	0	
276	Fred Lucas	1923	41	7	75	3	
277	Patrick McCarthy	1923	1	0	0	0	
278	Arnold Perry	1923	1	0	0	0	
279	Alexander Pringle	1923	1	0	3	0	
280	William Irvine	1923	41	5	21	9	
281	Read Masters	1923	31	4	18	0	
282	Herman Morgan	1923	1	0	3	0	
283	Harold Nicholls	1923	1	0	3	0	
284	Tiaki Omana	1923	1	0	0	0	
285	Lui Paewai	1923	8	0	6	0	
286	Cliff Porter	1923	41	7	48	12	
287	Edward Stewart	1923	1	0	6	0	
288	Ron Stewart	1923	39	5	32	3	
289	Robert Tunnicliff	1923	1	0	3	0	
290	Handley Brown	1924	20	0	35	0	
291	Cyril Brownlie	1924	31	3	33	0	
292	Bert Cooke	1924	44	8	123	12	
293	Gus Hart	1924	17	1	69	0	
294	Abe Munro	1924	9	0	9	0	
295	George Nēpia	1924	46	9	99	5	
296	Bill Dalley	1924	35	5	15	0	
297	Brian McCleary	1924	12	0	0	0	
298	Neil McGregor	1924	27	2	21	0	
299	Jim Parker	1924	21	3	56	3	
300	Alan Robilliard	1924	27	4	75	0	
301	Ian Harvey	1924	18	1	0	0	
302	James Archer	1925	2	0	0	0	
303	Jackie Blake	1925	13	0	15	0	
304	Bill Elvy	1925	12	0	36	0	
305	Innes Finlayson	1925	36	6	35	0	
306	Jack Harris	1925	8	0	4	0	
307	Lance Johnson	1925	25	4	19	0	
308	Alexander Kirkpatrick	1925	12	0	3	0	
309	Laurie Knight	1925	5	0	6	0	
310	Mick Lomas	1925	15	0	9	0	
311	Herman Mattson	1925	6	0	3	0	
312	Jack Walter	1925	7	0	12	0	
313	George Wise	1925	7	0	15	0	
314	Don Wright	1925	6	0	12	0	
315	David Dickson	1925	7	0	15	0	
316	Jack McNab	1925	1	0	0	0	
317	Tommy Corkill	1925	4	0	0	0	
318	Davy Johnston	1925	2	0	4	0	
319	Arthur Law	1925	4	0	3	0	
320	Gordon Lawson	1925	2	0	0	0	
321	Arthur Thomas	1925	3	0	0	0	
322	Archie McCormick	1925	1	0	0	0	
323	Bill Hazlett	1926	26	8	21	0	
324	Arthur Knight	1926	14	1	12	3	
325	Toby Sheen	1926	8	0	3	0	
326	Don Stevenson	1926	4	0	0	0	
327	Geoff Alley	1926	19	3	3	0	
328	Bill Wright	1926	1	0	0	0	
329	Bert Grenside	1928	21	6	42	9	
330	Swin Hadley	1928	11	4	0	0	
331	Herb Lilburne	1928	40	10	65	4	
332	George Scrimshaw	1928	11	1	15	0	
333	John Swain	1928	16	4	9	3	
334	Sydney Carleton	1928	21	6	6	0	
335	Pat Ward	1928	10	0	3	0	
336	Jim Burrows	1928	9	0	6	0	
337	Frank Kilby	1928	18	4	10	3	
338	David Lindsay	1928	14	3	63	3	
339	Rube McWilliams	1928	27	10	25	3	
340	Charlie Rushbrook	1928	10	0	53	0	
341	Eric Snow	1928	16	3	3	0	
342	Archie Strang	1928	17	5	44	13	
343	John Hore	1928	45	10	33	9	
344	Walter Batty	1928	6	4	3	3	
345	Nicholas Bradanovich	1928	2	0	19	0	
346	Victor Butler	1928	1	0	0	0	
347	Frank Clark	1928	4	0	0	0	
348	Frank Freitas	1928	4	0	3	0	
349	Arthur Holden	1928	3	0	0	0	
350	Lew Hook	1928	12	3	7	0	
351	William McClymont	1928	3	0	3	0	
352	Charlie Oliver	1928	33	7	67	6	
353	Bert Palmer	1928	18	3	14	3	
354	Dick Steere	1928	21	6	3	0	
355	Mick Willoughby	1928	4	0	0	0	
356	George Mehrtens	1928	3	0	0	0	
357	Topi Robinson	1928	3	0	9	0	
358	James Howden	1928	1	0	0	0	
359	James Mackay	1928	2	0	12	0	
360	Craig Mackenzie	1928	2	0	0	0	
361	Curly Page	1928	1	0	0	0	
362	Anthony Cottrell	1929	22	11	12	0	
363	Rawi Cundy	1929	6	1	31	3	
364	Wiremu Heke	1929	6	3	0	0	
365	Keith Reid	1929	5	2	3	0	
366	Charlie Sonntag	1929	8	3	0	0	
367	Alf Waterman	1929	7	2	18	0	
368	Clinton Stringfellow	1929	7	2	16	3	
369	Bert Geddes	1929	6	1	21	0	
370	Atholstan Mahoney	1929	26	4	6	0	
371	Walter Reside	1929	6	1	0	0	
372	Robert Souter	1929	4	0	0	0	
373	Jack Tuck	1929	6	3	0	0	
374	Tiny Leys	1929	5	1	0	0	
375	Alfred Kivell	1929	5	2	0	0	
376	George Hart	1930	35	11	84	21	
377	Don Oliver	1930	3	2	6	3	
378	Merv Corner	1930	25	6	25	0	
379	Hubert McLean	1930	29	9	50	9	
380	Nelson Ball	1931	22	5	37	12	
381	Ronald Bush	1931	1	1	14	14	
382	Ted Jessep	1931	8	2	0	0	
383	Don Max	1931	8	3	3	3	
384	Tom Metcalfe	1931	7	2	6	0	
385	Rusty Page	1931	18	6	9	3	
386	George Purdue	1931	7	4	3	3	
387	Frank Solomon	1931	9	3	9	3	
388	George Bullock-Douglas	1932	15	5	45	9	
389	Harcourt Caughey	1932	39	9	106	9	
390	Ray Clarke	1932	9	2	0	0	
391	Arthur Collins	1932	15	3	110	9	
392	Gordon Innes	1932	7	1	6	0	
393	Jack Manchester	1932	36	9	23	3	
394	Joe Procter	1932	4	1	18	0	
395	Ray Williams	1932	1	0	0	0	
396	Harold Pollock	1932	8	5	41	29	
397	Ned Barry	1932	10	1	6	0	
398	Edward Holder	1932	10	1	29	0	
399	Jack Griffiths	1934	30	7	50	0	
400	Bill Hadley	1934	25	8	6	6	
401	Arthur Lambourn	1934	40	10	9	0	
402	Hawea Mataira	1934	5	1	3	0	
403	Rod MacKenzie	1934	35	9	36	0	
404	Ronald King	1934	42	13	21	0	
405	Johnny Leeson	1934	5	0	0	0	
406	Herb Smith	1934	2	0	3	0	
407	Mike Gilbert	1935	27	4	127	20	
408	Tori Reid	1935	27	9	20	6	
409	George Adkins	1935	10	0	6	0	
410	Jack Best	1935	6	0	0	0	
411	Douglas Dalton	1935	21	9	3	0	
412	Neville Mitchell	1935	32	8	60	12	
413	Cyril Pepper	1935	17	0	12	0	
414	Joey Sadler	1935	19	5	12	0	
415	Dave Solomon	1935	8	0	3	0	
416	Bill Collins	1935	7	0	0	0	
417	Eric Tindill	1935	17	1	24	0	
418	Frederick Vorrath	1935	12	0	6	0	
419	Henry Brown	1935	8	0	15	0	
420	Jim Wynyard	1935	13	0	15	0	
421	Everard Jackson	1936	11	6	3	0	
422	Brian Killeen	1936	2	1	3	0	
423	Jack Rankin	1936	4	3	9	6	
424	Jim Watt	1936	2	2	6	6	
425	Jock Wells	1936	3	2	0	0	
426	Colin Gillies	1936	2	1	0	0	
427	Terry Lockington	1936	1	0	3	0	
428	Jack Sullivan	1936	9	6	18	9	
429	Ron Ward	1936	4	3	0	0	
430	Donald Cobden	1937	1	1	0	0	
431	John Dick	1937	5	3	6	3	
432	Jack Hooper	1937	7	3	9	0	
433	Allan Parkhill	1937	10	6	9	3	
434	Harold Simon	1937	3	3	0	0	
435	Jack Taylor	1937	9	6	45	24	
436	David Trevathan	1937	3	3	16	16	
437	Bill Phillips	1937	7	3	6	3	
438	Trevor Berghan	1938	6	3	0	0	
439	Les George	1938	7	3	0	0	
440	Harold Milliken	1938	7	3	6	3	
441	Tom Morrison	1938	5	3	14	4	
442	Charles Quaid	1938	4	2	0	0	
443	Charles Saxton	1938	7	3	12	9	
444	Claude Williams	1938	4	0	6	0	
445	Snow Bowman	1938	6	3	6	6	
446	Bill Carson	1938	3	0	3	0	
447	Arthur Wesney	1938	3	0	23	0	
448	Alan Wright	1938	4	0	33	0	
449	Fred Allen	1946	21	6	21	0	
450	Wally Argus	1946	10	4	42	12	
451	Has Catley	1946	21	7	3	0	
452	Jack Dunn	1946	1	1	0	0	
453	Ken Elliott	1946	2	2	3	3	
454	Ron Elvidge	1946	19	9	15	12	
455	Jack Finlay	1946	1	1	3	3	
456	Harry Frazer	1946	15	5	3	0	
457	Jimmy Haig	1946	2	2	3	3	
458	Morrie McHugh	1946	15	3	3	0	
459	Patrick Rhind	1946	2	2	0	0	
460	Bob Scott	1946	52	17	240	74	
461	Johnny Smith	1946	9	4	9	6	
462	Roy White	1946	10	4	3	3	
463	Charles Willocks	1946	22	5	0	0	
464	Jack McRae	1946	2	2	0	0	
465	Eric Boggs	1946	9	2	3	0	
466	Alf Budd	1946	2	2	0	0	
467	Morrie Goddard	1946	20	5	27	3	
468	Keith Arnold	1947	8	2	6	3	
469	Ben Couch	1947	7	3	3	0	
470	Ray Dalton	1947	20	2	3	0	
471	Lachie Grant	1947	23	4	12	0	
472	Fred Hobbs	1947	6	0	9	0	
473	Jack McLean	1947	5	2	21	0	
474	Johnny Simpson	1947	30	9	6	0	
475	Percy Tetzlaff	1947	7	2	0	0	
476	Neville Thornton	1947	19	3	21	3	
477	Jim Kearney	1947	22	4	33	9	
478	Tim Mason	1947	6	1	9	3	
479	Vincent Bevan	1947	25	6	3	0	
480	Leo Connolly	1947	5	0	0	0	
481	Jim McCormick	1947	3	0	0	0	
482	Peter Smith	1947	3	0	12	0	
483	Tom Webster	1947	4	0	38	0	
484	Arthur Hughes	1947	7	6	0	0	
485	Neville Black	1949	11	1	3	0	
486	Ian Botting	1949	9	0	6	0	
487	Pat Crowley	1949	21	6	12	3	
488	Peter Henderson	1949	19	7	24	6	
489	Jack McNab	1949	17	6	3	0	
490	Larry Savage	1949	12	3	3	0	
491	Kevin Skinner	1949	63	20	9	3	
492	Norman Wilson	1949	20	3	3	3	
493	Graham Delamore	1949	9	1	0	0	
494	Lester Harvey	1949	22	8	0	0	
495	Peter Johnstone	1949	26	9	9	3	
496	Bill Meates	1949	20	7	9	0	
497	Des Christian	1949	11	1	0	0	
498	Bill Conrad	1949	10	0	3	0	
499	Jack Goddard	1949	8	0	34	0	
500	Keith Gudsell	1949	6	0	0	0	
501	Alan Blake	1949	1	1	0	0	
502	Ron Bryers	1949	1	1	0	0	
503	Ronald Dobson	1949	1	1	0	0	
504	Jack Kelly	1949	16	2	86	3	
505	Bert Lunn	1949	2	2	0	0	
506	Graham Moore	1949	1	1	3	3	
507	Bill Mumm	1949	1	1	0	0	
508	Ray O'Callaghan	1949	1	1	3	3	
509	Rex Orr	1949	1	1	0	0	
510	Bob Stuart	1949	27	7	3	3	
511	Richard White	1949	55	23	36	9	
512	Hector Wilson	1949	13	5	12	3	
513	Garth Bond	1949	1	1	0	0	
514	Desmond O'Donnell	1949	1	1	0	0	
515	Roy Roper	1949	5	5	9	9	
516	Harrison Rowley	1949	1	1	0	0	
517	George Beatty	1950	1	1	0	0	
518	Nau Cherrington	1950	7	1	30	0	
519	Laurie Haig	1950	29	9	15	5	
520	Graham Mexted	1950	6	1	15	0	
521	John Tanner	1950	24	5	33	3	
522	Maurice Cockerill	1951	11	3	50	11	
523	Bob Duff	1951	18	11	0	0	
524	Percy Erceg	1951	9	4	9	0	
525	Brian Fitzpatrick	1951	22	3	15	0	
526	Ian Hammond	1951	8	1	3	0	
527	Bill McCaw	1951	32	5	18	0	
528	Eddie Robinson	1951	11	5	3	3	
529	Brian Steele	1951	9	3	5	0	
530	Len Wilson	1951	7	0	17	0	
531	Ron Jarden	1951	37	16	213	42	
532	Tom Lynch	1951	10	3	27	9	
533	Ray Bell	1951	9	3	29	6	
534	Peter Burke	1951	12	3	6	0	
535	Ponty Reid	1951	17	5	6	0	
536	Ross Wightman	1951	4	0	18	0	
537	Peter Eastgate	1952	17	3	3	0	
538	Allan Elsom	1952	22	6	42	3	
539	Jim Fitzgerald	1952	17	1	45	3	
540	John Hotop	1952	3	3	6	6	
541	Ian Irvine	1952	1	1	0	0	
542	Hugh McLaren	1952	1	1	0	0	
543	Kevin Meates	1952	2	2	0	0	
544	Noel Bowden	1952	1	1	3	3	
545	Mick Bremner	1952	18	2	0	0	
546	Keith Davis	1952	25	10	12	0	
547	Jack Skeen	1952	1	1	0	0	
548	Keith Bagley	1953	20	0	3	3	
549	Bill Clark	1953	24	9	21	9	
550	Colin Loader	1953	16	4	9	0	
551	Arthur Woods	1953	14	0	2	0	
552	Ian Clarke	1953	83	24	16	0	
553	Nelson Dalzell	1953	22	5	15	3	
554	Stu Freebairn	1953	14	0	30	0	
555	Ronald Hemi	1953	46	16	18	3	
556	Peter Jones	1953	37	11	60	6	
557	Des Oliver	1953	20	2	12	0	
558	Hallard White	1953	16	4	6	0	
559	Doug Wilson	1953	14	2	18	0	
560	Guy Bowers	1953	15	2	6	0	
561	Maurice Dixon	1953	28	10	51	6	
562	Bob O'Dea	1953	5	0	0	0	
563	Robin Archer	1955	13	4	15	0	
564	Mark Irwin	1955	25	7	0	0	
565	Ross Smith	1955	1	1	0	0	
566	Kevin Stuart	1955	1	1	0	0	
567	Lindsay Townsend	1955	2	2	0	0	
568	Ivan Vodanovich	1955	3	3	3	3	
569	Pat Walsh	1955	27	13	23	12	
570	Bill Gray	1955	11	6	6	0	
571	Tom Katene	1955	1	1	0	0	
572	Ross Brown	1955	25	16	27	12	
573	John Buxton	1955	2	2	0	0	
574	Tiny Hill	1955	19	11	2	0	
575	Don McIntosh	1956	13	4	9	0	
576	Pat Vincent	1956	2	2	0	0	
577	Frank McAtamney	1956	9	1	6	0	
578	Nev MacEwan	1956	52	20	27	6	
579	Dennis Young	1956	61	22	9	0	
580	Don Clarke	1956	89	31	781	207	
581	Terry Lineen	1957	35	12	48	0	
582	Frank McMullen	1957	29	11	45	12	
583	Colin Meads	1957	133	55	86	21	
584	Russell Watt	1957	42	9	114	3	
585	Wilson Whineray	1957	77	32	24	6	
586	Dave Gillespie	1957	23	1	3	0	
587	Howard Levien	1957	8	0	30	0	
588	Brian Molloy	1957	5	0	3	0	
589	Rex Pickering	1957	21	3	21	0	
590	Alistair Soper	1957	8	0	3	0	
591	Mick Cossey	1958	1	1	0	0	
592	Tom Coughlan	1958	1	1	0	0	
593	John Graham	1958	53	22	33	6	
594	Lloyd Ashby	1958	1	1	0	0	
595	Adrian Clarke	1958	14	3	12	0	
596	Brian Finlay	1959	1	1	0	0	
597	Bruce McPhail	1959	2	2	0	0	
598	Roger Urbahn	1959	15	3	9	3	
599	Kevin Briscoe	1959	43	9	55	0	
600	Ralph Caulton	1959	50	16	93	24	
601	Dick Conway	1959	10	3	15	9	
602	Tuppy Diack	1959	1	0	0	0	
603	John McCullough	1959	3	0	0	0	
604	Kel Tremain	1959	38	27	48	81	
605	Des Webb	1959	1	1	0	0	
606	Eric Anderson	1960	10	0	6	0	
607	Hugh Burry	1960	11	0	24	0	
608	Tony Davies	1960	17	3	94	0	
609	Maurice Graham	1960	1	0	0	0	
610	Ron Horsley	1960	3	0	28	3	
611	Kevin Laidlaw	1960	17	3	21	0	
612	Terry O'Sullivan	1960	16	4	21	3	
613	Eddie Stapleton	1960	1	0	3	0	
614	Denis Cameron	1960	8	0	6	0	
615	Steve Nesbit	1960	13	2	6	0	
616	Roger Boon	1960	6	0	0	0	
617	Des Connor	1961	15	12	3	0	
618	Don McKay	1961	12	5	54	6	
619	Stan Meads	1961	30	15	12	0	
620	Neil Wolfe	1961	14	6	6	0	
621	Victor Yates	1961	9	3	15	3	
622	Paul Little	1961	29	10	27	3	
623	Kevin Barry	1962	23	0	26	0	
624	John Creighton	1962	6	1	12	0	
625	Rod Heeps	1962	10	5	47	3	
626	Jules Le Lievre	1962	25	1	8	0	
627	Waka Nathan	1962	37	14	69	12	
628	Bruce Watt	1962	29	8	27	9	
629	Ray Moreton	1962	12	7	24	9	
630	John Morrissey	1962	3	3	6	6	
631	Keith Nelson	1962	18	2	6	0	
632	Mack Herewini	1962	32	10	95	21	
633	Barry Thomas	1962	4	4	0	0	
634	Ian Uttley	1963	2	2	0	0	
635	Malcolm Dick	1963	55	15	126	12	
636	Ken Gray	1963	50	24	27	12	
637	Brian Lochore	1963	68	25	21	6	
638	Allan Stewart	1963	26	8	6	0	
639	Derek Arnold	1963	15	4	24	0	
640	Bill Davis	1963	53	11	72	9	
641	Chris Laidlaw	1963	57	20	48	12	
642	Ian MacRae	1963	45	17	42	9	
643	John Major	1963	24	1	0	0	
644	Ian Smith	1963	24	9	30	6	
645	Earle Kirton	1963	49	13	42	12	
646	Don Clark	1964	2	2	0	0	
647	John Collins	1964	3	3	0	0	
648	Bruce McLeod	1964	46	24	27	12	
649	Mick Williment	1964	9	9	70	70	
650	Peter Murdoch	1964	5	5	6	6	
651	Ron Rangi	1964	10	10	9	9	
652	Bill Birtwistle	1965	12	7	33	12	
653	Fergie McCormick	1965	44	16	453	121	
654	Jack Hazlett	1966	12	6	3	0	
655	Sid Going	1967	86	29	164	44	
656	Brian Muller	1967	35	14	9	0	
657	Sam Strahan	1967	45	17	10	0	
658	Wayne Cottrell	1967	37	9	33	6	
659	Arthur Jennings	1967	6	0	0	0	
660	Grahame Thorne	1967	39	10	119	3	
661	Murray Wills	1967	5	0	0	0	
662	Phil Clarke	1967	4	0	0	0	
663	Alister Hopkinson	1967	35	9	12	0	
664	Tony Steel	1966	23	9	60	21	
665	Gerald Kember	1967	19	1	158	14	
666	Ian Kirkpatrick	1967	113	39	180	57	
667	Alan Smith	1967	18	3	3	0	
668	Graham Williams	1967	18	5	50	0	
669	Michael Knight	1968	8	0	18	0	
670	Alan Sutherland	1968	64	10	151	12	
671	Bill Currey	1968	7	0	24	0	
672	Peter Johns	1968	6	0	6	0	
673	Tom Lister	1968	26	8	33	6	
674	Terry McCashin	1968	7	0	3	0	
675	Tony Kreft	1968	4	1	6	0	
676	Mick O'Callaghan	1968	3	3	0	0	
677	Owen Stephens	1968	1	1	0	0	
678	George Skudder	1969	14	1	15	3	
679	Jake Burns	1970	9	0	0	0	
680	Jamie Hendrie	1970	1	0	0	0	
681	Bevan Holmes	1970	31	0	37	0	
682	Bruce Hunter	1970	10	3	24	0	
683	Buff Milner	1970	16	1	27	0	
684	Neil Thimbleby	1970	13	1	0	0	
685	Blair Furlong	1970	11	1	32	0	
686	Keith Murdoch	1970	27	3	20	4	
687	Ron Urlich	1970	35	2	30	0	
688	Alex Wyllie	1970	40	11	42	8	
689	Bryan Williams	1970	113	38	401	71	
690	Bob Burgess	1971	30	7	50	6	
691	Ken Carrington	1971	9	3	20	0	
692	Richie Guy	1971	9	4	8	0	
693	Alan McNaughton	1971	9	3	12	0	
694	Tane Norton	1971	61	27	8	0	
695	Peter Whiting	1971	56	20	20	12	
696	Howard Joseph	1971	2	2	0	0	
697	Laurie Mains	1971	15	4	153	21	
698	Mick Duncan	1971	2	2	0	0	
699	Phil Gard	1971	7	1	0	0	
700	Hamish Macdonald	1972	48	12	8	4	
701	Trevor Morris	1972	23	3	175	33	
702	Bruce Robertson	1972	102	34	142	22	
703	Graham Whiting	1972	31	6	4	0	
704	Lin Colling	1972	21	0	24	0	
705	John Dougan	1972	12	2	11	4	
706	Ian Eliason	1972	19	0	8	0	
707	Duncan Hales	1972	27	4	48	0	
708	Jeff Matheson	1972	13	5	0	0	
709	Mike Parkinson	1972	20	7	20	0	
710	Alistair Scown	1972	17	5	8	4	
711	Lyn Jaffray	1972	23	7	28	4	
712	Graham Sims	1972	1	1	0	0	
713	Joe Karam	1972	42	10	345	65	
714	Mark Sayers	1972	15	0	16	0	
715	Grant Batty	1972	56	15	180	16	
716	Andy Haden	1972	117	41	32	8	
717	Ian Hurst	1972	32	5	48	8	
718	Kent Lambert	1972	40	11	6	0	
719	Ian Stevens	1972	33	3	32	4	
720	Ken Stewart	1972	55	13	24	0	
721	Lindsay Clark	1972	7	0	0	0	
722	Sandy McNicol	1973	5	0	0	0	
723	Murray Jones	1973	5	1	0	0	
724	Terry Morrison	1973	5	1	4	0	
725	Bob Lendrum	1973	3	1	32	2	
726	Peter Sloane	1973	16	1	12	0	
727	John Callesen	1974	18	4	4	0	
728	Ash Gardiner	1974	11	1	8	0	
729	Bruce Gemmell	1974	6	2	4	0	
730	Lawrie Knight	1974	35	6	52	4	
731	Andy Leslie	1974	34	10	28	4	
732	Jon McLachlan	1974	8	1	32	0	
733	Joe Morgan	1974	22	5	20	4	
734	Duncan Robertson	1974	30	10	50	8	
735	Kerry Tanner	1974	27	7	0	0	
736	Bob Barber	1974	6	0	16	0	
737	Doug Bruce	1974	41	14	43	15	
738	Bill Bush	1974	37	12	4	0	
739	Graeme Crossman	1974	19	0	12	0	
740	Kevin Eveleigh	1974	30	4	4	0	
741	Greg Kane	1974	7	0	16	0	
742	Ken Going	1974	3	0	11	0	
743	Terry Mitchell	1974	17	1	36	0	
744	Bill Osborne	1975	48	16	40	0	
745	Lyn Davis	1976	16	3	12	0	
746	Neil Purvis	1976	12	1	36	0	
747	Kit Fawcett	1976	13	2	44	0	
748	Gary Seear	1976	34	12	46	11	
749	Brad Johnstone	1976	45	13	28	8	
750	Frank Oliver	1976	43	17	8	4	
751	Perry Harris	1976	4	1	0	0	
752	John Brake	1976	5	0	8	0	
753	Scott Cartwright	1976	7	0	28	0	
754	Stewart Cron	1976	6	0	8	0	
755	Kenneth Granger	1976	6	0	20	0	
756	Kevin Greene	1976	8	0	0	0	
757	Graham Mourie	1976	61	21	64	16	
758	Doug Rollerson	1976	24	8	110	24	
759	Pat Ryan	1976	5	0	4	0	
760	Paul Sapsford	1976	7	0	8	0	
761	John Spiers	1976	28	5	4	0	
762	Vance Stewart	1976	12	0	8	0	
763	Eddie Stokes	1976	5	0	4	0	
764	Richard Wilson	1976	25	2	272	10	
765	John Black	1976	26	3	12	0	
766	Stuart Conn	1976	6	0	0	0	
767	Merv Jaffray	1976	4	0	12	0	
768	John McEldowney	1976	10	2	0	0	
769	Greg Rowlands	1976	4	0	44	0	
770	Murray Taylor	1976	30	7	28	3	
771	Mark Taylor	1976	27	9	51	4	
772	Stu Wilson	1976	85	34	200	76	
773	Colin Farrell	1977	2	2	0	0	
774	Brian Ford	1977	20	4	32	0	
775	Bevan Wilson	1977	12	8	60	55	
776	John Ashworth	1977	52	24	4	4	
777	Andy Dalton	1977	58	35	16	12	
778	Brian McKechnie	1977	26	10	148	46	
779	Dick Myers	1977	5	1	4	0	
780	Robbie Stuart	1977	6	1	4	0	
781	Mark Donaldson	1977	35	13	28	4	
782	Gary Knight	1977	66	36	12	4	
783	Barry Ashworth	1978	7	2	8	0	
784	Leicester Rutledge	1978	31	13	28	0	
785	John Fleming	1978	35	5	16	4	
786	Robert Kururangi	1978	8	0	16	0	
787	John Loveday	1978	7	0	0	0	
788	Ash McGregor	1978	3	0	0	0	
789	Clive Currie	1978	4	2	18	0	
790	Eddie Dunn	1978	20	2	25	4	
791	Dave Loveridge	1978	54	24	36	12	
792	Wayne Graham	1978	8	1	0	0	
793	Murray Watts	1979	13	5	28	4	
794	Gary Cunningham	1979	17	5	12	0	
795	Mike McCool	1979	2	1	0	0	
796	Lachie Cameron	1979	17	5	16	0	
797	Bernie Fraser	1979	55	23	184	23	
798	Murray Mexted	1979	72	34	84	16	
799	Barry Thompson	1979	8	0	0	0	
800	Mike Burgoyne	1979	6	0	4	0	
801	Kieran Keane	1979	6	0	0	0	
802	Rod Ketels	1979	16	5	0	0	
803	Tim Twigden	1979	15	2	28	0	
804	Allan Hewson	1979	34	19	357	201	
805	Geoff Hines	1980	12	1	16	0	
806	Wayne Smith	1980	35	17	36	6	
807	Brett Codlin	1980	13	3	127	23	
808	Graeme Higginson	1980	14	6	12	0	
809	Hika Reid	1980	40	9	32	8	
810	Mark Shaw	1980	69	30	104	20	
811	Stephen Scott	1980	4	0	20	0	
812	Nicky Allen	1980	9	2	28	4	
813	Grant Perry	1980	1	0	0	0	
814	Ken Bloxham	1980	2	0	0	0	
815	Andy Jefferd	1980	5	3	0	0	
816	Greg Burgess	1980	2	1	0	0	
817	Geoff Old	1980	17	3	4	0	
818	Jamie Salmon	1980	7	3	8	4	
819	Ken Taylor	1980	1	0	8	0	
820	Geoff Valli	1980	1	0	9	0	
821	Craig Wickes	1980	1	0	0	0	
822	Fred Woodman	1980	14	3	24	0	
823	Tu Wyllie	1980	1	0	4	0	
824	Hud Rickit	1981	2	2	0	0	
825	Steven Pokere	1981	39	18	36	8	
826	Frank Shelford	1981	22	4	36	0	
827	Gary Whetton	1981	101	58	36	4	
828	Andrew Donald	1981	20	7	20	0	
829	Wayne Neville	1981	4	0	0	0	
830	Jock Ross	1981	5	0	0	0	
831	Paul Koteka	1981	6	2	4	0	
832	Arthur Stone	1981	23	9	23	7	
833	Brian Morrissey	1981	3	0	4	0	
834	John Boe	1981	2	0	0	0	
835	Ian Dunn	1983	13	3	8	0	
836	Jock Hobbs	1983	39	21	52	16	
837	Warwick Taylor	1983	40	24	36	20	
838	Kevin Boroevich	1983	26	3	0	0	
839	Gary Braid	1983	13	2	4	0	
840	Scott Crichton	1983	7	2	0	0	
841	Robbie Deans	1983	19	5	252	50	
842	Craig Green	1983	39	20	108	44	
843	David Kirk	1983	34	17	68	24	
844	Alastair Robinson	1983	4	0	0	0	
845	Bruce Smith	1983	10	3	28	4	
846	Brett Wilson	1983	3	0	4	0	
847	Albert Anderson	1983	25	6	0	0	
848	Kieran Crowley	1983	35	19	316	105	
849	Murray Davie	1983	5	1	4	4	
850	Brian McGrattan	1983	23	6	16	0	
851	Mike Clamp	1984	15	2	72	4	
852	Murray Pierce	1984	54	26	16	0	
853	Alan Whetton	1984	65	35	104	40	
854	John Kirwan	1984	96	63	275	143	
855	Kawhena Woodman	1984	6	0	12	0	
856	Mark Finlay	1984	2	0	18	0	
857	Grant Fox	1984	78	46	1067	645	
858	John Mills	1984	2	0	4	0	
859	Bruce Hemara	1985	3	0	0	0	
860	Buck Shelford	1985	48	22	88	20	
861	Kurt Sherlock	1985	3	0	0	0	
862	Steve McDowall	1985	81	46	28	12	
863	Bryce Robins	1985	4	0	16	0	
864	Victor Simpson	1985	4	2	0	0	
865	John Drake	1985	12	8	4	4	
866	Frano Botica	1986	27	7	123	6	
867	Mike Brewer	1986	61	32	49	4	
868	Mark Brooke-Cowden	1986	6	3	12	8	
869	Greg Cooper	1986	7	7	63	63	
870	Andy Earl	1986	45	14	57	12	
871	Sean Fitzpatrick	1986	128	92	90	55	
872	Brett Harvey	1986	1	1	0	0	
873	Gordon Macpherson	1986	1	1	0	0	
874	Joe Stanley	1986	49	27	28	16	
875	Terry Wright	1986	64	30	208	72	
876	Brent Anderson	1986	3	1	4	0	
877	Michael Speight	1986	5	1	0	0	
878	Marty Berry	1986	10	1	9	0	
879	John Gallagher	1986	41	18	251	52	
880	Dean Kenny	1986	3	0	0	0	
881	Richard Loe	1986	78	49	56	25	
882	Michael Jones	1987	74	55	69	56	
883	Zinzan Brooke	1987	100	58	195	89	
884	Bernie McCahill	1987	32	10	16	4	
885	Graeme Bachop	1987	54	31	79	18	
886	John Buchan	1987	2	0	0	0	
887	Matthew Cooper	1987	26	8	224	55	
888	Robbie McLean	1987	2	0	0	0	
889	John Schuster	1987	26	10	36	4	
890	Paul Simonsson	1987	2	0	28	0	
891	Bruce Deans	1987	23	10	56	24	
892	Warren Gatland	1988	17	0	8	0	
893	Jasin Goldsmith	1988	8	0	20	0	
894	Ron Williams	1988	10	0	0	0	
895	Shayne Philpott	1988	14	2	33	0	
896	Steve Gordon	1989	17	2	0	0	
897	Paul Henderson	1989	25	7	21	9	
898	Walter Little	1989	75	50	71	44	
899	Graham Purvis	1989	28	2	4	4	
900	Va'aiga Tuigamala	1989	39	19	61	21	
901	Craig Innes	1989	30	17	60	24	
902	Ian Jones	1989	105	79	65	42	
903	Matthew Ridge	1989	6	0	4	0	
904	Kevin Schuler	1989	13	4	19	0	
905	John Timu	1989	50	26	117	31	
906	Rob Gordon	1990	3	0	0	0	
907	Laurence Hullena	1990	9	0	0	0	
908	Simon Mannix	1990	9	1	70	0	
909	Paul McGahan	1990	6	0	8	0	
910	Olo Brown	1990	69	56	20	20	
911	Chris Tregaskis	1991	4	0	0	0	
912	Mark Carter	1991	10	7	5	0	
913	Jon Preston	1991	27	10	83	34	
914	Jason Hewett	1991	1	1	4	4	
915	Frank Bunce	1992	69	55	131	96	
916	Mark Cooksley	1992	23	11	5	0	
917	Richard Turner	1992	2	2	4	4	
918	Arran Pene	1992	26	15	16	16	
919	Eroni Clarke	1992	24	10	50	25	
920	Jamie Joseph	1992	30	20	15	5	
921	Blair Larsen	1992	40	17	14	4	
922	Ant Strachan	1992	17	11	18	8	
923	Graham Dowd	1992	8	1	0	0	
924	Robin Brooke	1992	69	62	20	20	
925	Stephen Bachop	1992	18	5	33	0	
926	Marc Ellis	1992	20	8	98	55	
927	Eric Rush	1992	29	9	90	25	
928	Pat Lam	1992	1	0	0	0	
929	Dallas Seymour	1992	3	0	5	0	
930	Glenn Taylor	1992	6	1	0	0	
931	Craig Dowd	1992	67	60	15	10	
932	Lee Stensness	1993	14	8	15	15	
933	Mark "Bull" Allen	1993	27	8	10	5	
934	Stu Forster	1993	12	6	0	0	
935	Jeff Wilson	1993	71	60	299	234	
936	Liam Barry	1993	10	1	10	0	
937	Richard Fromont	1993	10	0	0	0	
938	Norm Hewitt	1993	14	9	35	0	
939	Shane Howarth	1993	10	4	135	54	
940	John Mitchell	1993	6	0	10	0	
941	Jonah Lomu	1994	73	63	215	185	
942	Alama Ieremia	1994	40	30	45	25	
943	Josh Kronfeld	1995	56	54	80	70	
944	Andrew Mehrtens	1995	72	70	994	967	
945	Glen Osborne	1995	29	19	85	55	
946	Simon Culhane	1995	9	6	150	114	
947	Todd Blackadder	1995	25	12	15	5	
948	Justin Marshall	1995	88	81	140	120	
949	Taine Randell	1995	61	51	60	60	
950	Tabai Matson	1995	5	0	5	0	
951	Carlos Spencer	1995	44	35	383	291	
952	Christian Cullen	1996	60	58	266	236	
953	Scott McLeod	1996	17	10	30	5	
954	Adrian Cashmore	1996	2	2	0	0	
955	Con Barrell	1996	4	0	0	0	
956	Andrew Blowers	1996	18	11	5	0	
957	Ofisa Tonu'u	1996	8	5	10	0	
958	Chresten Davis	1996	2	0	0	0	
959	Phil Coffin	1996	3	0	0	0	
960	Anton Oliver	1996	67	59	25	15	
961	Tana Umaga	1997	79	74	185	180	
962	Charles Riechelmann	1997	10	6	15	5	
963	Jeremy Stanley	1997	3	0	0	0	
964	Todd Miller	1997	4	0	20	0	
965	Mark Robinson (halfback)	1997	8	3	15	5	
966	Steve Surridge	1997	3	0	5	0	
967	Aaron Hopa	1997	4	0	5	0	
968	Gordon Slater	1997	6	3	5	5	
969	Mark Mayerhofler	1997	6	6	10	10	
970	Caleb Ralph	1997	15	13	45	40	
971	Carl Hoeft	1997	31	30	0	0	
972	Isitolo Maka	1998	4	4	5	5	
973	Joeli Vidiri	1998	2	2	5	5	
974	Scott Robertson	1998	23	23	20	20	
975	Royce Willis	1998	12	12	0	0	
976	Norm Berryman	1998	1	1	0	0	
977	Kees Meeuws	1998	45	42	50	50	
978	Xavier Rush	1998	8	8	0	0	
979	Pita Alatini	1998	20	17	35	30	
980	Tony Brown	1998	19	18	178	171	
981	Kupu Vanisi	1999	1	1	0	0	
982	Dylan Mika	1999	8	7	5	5	
983	Byron Kelleher	1999	58	57	40	40	
984	Mark Hammett	1999	30	29	15	15	
985	Daryl Gibson	1999	19	19	5	5	
986	Norm Maxwell	1999	36	36	25	25	
987	Greg Feek	1999	10	10	0	0	
988	Reuben Thorne	1999	51	50	25	25	
989	Rhys Duggan	1999	1	1	0	0	
990	Troy Flavell	2000	22	22	30	30	
991	Greg Somerville	2000	59	58	5	5	
992	Doug Howlett	2000	63	62	245	245	
993	Filo Tiatia	2000	2	2	10	10	
994	Ron Cribb	2000	15	15	20	20	
995	Leon MacDonald	2000	53	53	141	141	
996	Mark Robinson (centre)	2000	9	0	5	5	
997	Bruce Reihana	2000	2	2	10	10	
998	Jason O'Halloran	2000	1	1	0	0	
999	Marty Holah	2001	39	36	20	15	
1000	Carl Hayman	2001	46	45	10	10	
1001	Mark Ranby	2001	1	1	0	0	
1002	Jerry Collins	2001	50	48	25	25	
1003	Chris Jack	2001	68	67	25	25	
1004	Ben Blair	2001	6	4	62	4	
1005	Dave Hewett	2001	24	22	10	10	
1006	David Hill	2001	3	1	0	0	
1007	Simon Maling	2001	13	11	0	0	
1008	Nathan Mauger	2001	2	0	0	0	
1009	Paul Miller	2001	2	0	5	0	
1010	Roger Randle	2001	2	0	0	0	
1011	Dion Waller	2001	3	1	0	0	
1012	Tom Willis	2001	7	5	0	0	
1013	Aaron Mauger	2001	46	45	100	90	
1014	Richie McCaw	2001	149	148	135	135	
1015	Joe McDonnell	2002	8	8	5	5	
1016	Sam Harding	2002	1	1	0	0	
1017	Sam Broomhall	2002	4	4	0	0	
1018	Steve Devine	2002	10	10	0	0	
1019	Andrew Hore	2002	83	83	40	40	
1020	Keith Lowen	2002	1	1	0	0	
1021	Keith Robinson	2002	12	12	0	0	
1022	Ali Williams	2002	78	77	35	35	
1023	Danny Lee	2002	2	2	5	5	
1024	Brad Mika	2002	3	3	0	0	
1025	Tony Woodcock	2002	118	118	50	50	
1026	Keven Mealamu	2002	133	132	60	60	
1027	Daniel Braid	2002	6	6	5	5	
1028	Rodney So'oialo	2002	63	62	30	30	
1029	Regan King	2002	1	1	5	5	
1030	Paul Steinmetz	2002	1	1	0	0	
1031	Ma'a Nonu	2003	104	103	160	155	
1032	Joe Rokocoko	2003	69	68	235	230	
1033	Mils Muliaina	2003	102	100	170	170	
1034	Dan Carter	2003	112	112	1598	1598	
1035	Brad Thorn	2003	60	59	20	20	
1036	Corey Flynn	2003	17	15	15	15	
1037	Ben Atiga	2003	1	1	0	0	
1038	Jono Gibbes	2004	8	8	0	0	
1039	Nick Evans	2004	16	16	103	103	
1040	Sam Tuitupou	2004	9	9	5	5	
1041	Craig Newby	2004	3	3	0	0	
1042	Mose Tuiali'i	2004	10	9	5	5	
1043	Rico Gear	2004	20	19	65	55	
1044	Conrad Smith	2004	94	94	130	130	
1045	Saimone Taumoepeau	2004	4	3	5	5	
1046	Jimmy Cowan	2004	53	51	35	35	
1047	Steven Bates	2004	2	1	0	0	
1048	Casey Laulala	2004	3	2	5	0	
1049	Piri Weepu	2004	73	71	110	103	
1050	Jerome Kaino	2004	83	81	65	60	
1051	James Ryan	2005	9	9	0	0	
1052	Sitiveni Sivivatu	2005	46	45	145	145	
1053	Derren Witcombe	2005	5	5	0	0	
1054	Sosene Anesi	2005	1	1	0	0	
1055	Sione Lauaki	2005	17	17	15	15	
1056	Campbell Johnstone	2005	3	3	0	0	
1057	Luke McAlister	2005	31	30	153	153	
1058	Kevin Senio	2005	1	1	0	0	
1059	Chris Masoe	2005	20	20	15	15	
1060	Neemia Tialata	2005	44	43	10	10	
1061	Angus Macdonald	2005	2	2	0	0	
1062	John Afoa	2005	38	36	5	5	
1063	Jason Eaton	2005	17	15	5	5	
1064	Isaia Toeava	2005	37	36	40	40	
1065	Clarke Dermody	2006	3	3	5	5	
1066	Greg Rawlinson	2006	4	4	0	0	
1067	Scott Hamilton	2006	2	2	5	5	
1068	Andy Ellis	2006	28	28	20	20	
1069	Brendon Leonard	2007	14	13	10	10	
1070	Ross Filipo	2007	5	4	0	0	
1071	John Schwalger	2007	2	2	5	5	
1072	Anthony Tuitavake	2008	7	6	5	5	
1073	Adam Thomson	2008	31	29	30	30	
1074	Anthony Boric	2008	25	24	15	10	
1075	Stephen Donald	2008	25	23	116	98	
1076	Richard Kahui	2008	18	17	50	50	
1077	Rudi Wulf	2008	4	4	0	0	
1078	Kevin O'Neill	2008	1	1	0	0	
1079	Hosea Gear	2008	15	14	30	30	
1080	Cory Jane	2008	55	53	90	90	
1081	Jamie Mackintosh	2008	2	1	0	0	
1082	Liam Messam	2008	45	43	30	30	
1083	Kieran Read	2008	128	127	130	130	
1084	Ben Franks	2008	48	47	10	10	
1085	Scott Waldrom	2008	1	0	0	0	
1086	Hika Elliot	2008	5	4	0	0	
1087	Alby Mathewson	2008	5	4	0	0	
1088	Isaac Ross	2009	8	8	10	10	
1089	Tanerau Latimer	2009	6	5	0	0	
1090	Bryn Evans	2009	2	2	0	0	
1091	Wyatt Crockett	2009	72	71	10	10	
1092	Lelia Masaga	2009	1	1	0	0	
1093	George Whitelock	2009	1	1	5	5	
1094	Owen Franks	2009	108	108	0	0	
1095	Aled de Malmanche	2009	5	5	0	0	
1096	Tom Donnelly	2009	15	15	0	0	
1097	Zac Guildford	2009	11	10	30	30	
1098	Mike Delany	2009	2	1	3	0	
1099	Tamati Ellison	2009	5	4	0	0	
1100	Ben Smith	2009	85	84	200	195	
1101	Israel Dagg	2010	66	66	138	138	
1102	Benson Stanley	2010	3	3	0	0	
1103	Victor Vito	2010	33	33	20	20	
1104	Sam Whitelock	2010	153	153	35	35	
1105	Aaron Cruden	2010	50	50	322	322	
1106	Rene Ranger	2010	6	6	5	5	
1107	Colin Slade	2010	21	21	78	78	
1108	Sonny Bill Williams	2010	58	58	65	65	
1109	Jarrad Hoeata	2011	3	3	0	0	
1110	Brodie Retallick	2012	109	109	45	45	
1111	Julian Savea	2012	54	54	230	230	
1112	Aaron Smith	2012	125	125	147	147	
1113	Sam Cane	2012	105	104	90	85	
1114	Luke Romano	2012	32	31	10	10	
1115	Beauden Barrett	2012	151	147	859	843	
1116	Charlie Faumuina	2012	50	50	20	20	
1117	Dane Coles	2012	90	90	115	115	
1118	Tawera Kerr-Barlow	2012	29	27	10	10	
1119	Ben Afeaki	2013	1	1	0	0	
1120	Jeremy Thrush	2013	12	12	10	10	
1121	Steve Luatua	2013	15	15	10	10	
1122	Charles Piutau	2013	17	17	25	25	
1123	Matt Todd	2013	25	25	15	15	
1124	Ryan Crotty	2013	48	48	60	60	
1125	Tom Taylor	2013	3	3	14	14	
1126	Francis Saili	2013	2	2	0	0	
1127	Dominic Bird	2013	3	2	0	0	
1128	Frank Halai	2013	1	1	5	5	
1129	Luke Whitelock	2013	8	7	0	0	
1130	Jeffery Toomaga-Allen	2013	3	1	0	0	
1131	Malakai Fekitoa	2014	24	24	40	40	
1132	TJ Perenara	2014	90	89	85	80	
1133	Patrick Tuipulotu	2014	64	59	45	40	
1134	Joe Moody	2014	57	57	25	25	
1135	Nathan Harris	2014	22	20	15	10	
1136	Augustine Pulu	2014	2	2	0	0	
1137	James Parsons	2014	2	2	0	0	
1138	George Moala	2015	4	4	15	15	
1139	Nepo Laulala	2015	53	53	0	0	
1140	Brad Weber	2015	18	18	30	30	
1141	Charlie Ngatai	2015	1	1	0	0	
1142	Waisake Naholo	2015	27	26	80	80	
1143	Codie Taylor	2015	115	114	135	125	
1144	James Broadhurst	2015	1	1	0	0	
1145	Lima Sopoaga	2015	18	16	61	55	
1146	Nehe Milner-Skudder	2015	13	13	60	60	
1147	Ardie Savea	2016	114	112	175	175	
1148	Seta Tamanivalu	2016	5	3	0	0	
1149	Elliot Dixon	2016	3	3	5	5	
1150	Ofa Tuʻungafasi	2016	70	68	5	5	
1151	Liam Squire	2016	24	23	25	20	
1152	Kane Hames	2016	10	9	0	0	
1153	Anton Lienert-Brown	2016	98	94	85	85	
1154	Damian McKenzie	2016	84	83	428	423	
1155	Scott Barrett	2016	93	91	35	35	
1156	Rieko Ioane	2016	94	91	220	200	
1157	Liam Coltman	2016	8	8	0	0	
1158	Vaea Fifita	2017	12	11	15	10	
1159	Jordie Barrett	2017	87	86	311	306	
1160	Ngani Laumape	2017	17	15	50	40	
1161	David Havili	2017	32	30	45	45	
1162	Tim Perry	2017	8	6	0	0	
1163	Asafo Aumua	2017	31	27	20	15	
1164	Matt Duffie	2017	2	0	5	0	
1165	Jack Goodhue	2017	19	18	15	15	
1166	Akira Ioane	2017	22	21	5	5	
1167	Richie Mo'unga	2017	59	57	470	464	
1168	Atu Moli	2017	5	4	0	0	
1169	Mitchell Drummond	2017	2	1	0	0	
1170	Dillon Hunt	2017	2	1	0	0	
1171	Karl Tu'inukuafe	2018	27	27	5	5	
1172	Shannon Frizell	2018	35	35	40	40	
1173	Jackson Hemopo	2018	5	5	0	0	
1174	Te Toiroa Tahuriorangi	2018	3	3	5	5	
1175	Angus Taʻavao	2018	23	23	15	15	
1176	Dalton Papali'i	2018	37	37	40	40	
1177	Matt Proctor	2018	1	1	5	5	
1178	George Bridge	2018	19	19	60	60	Canterbury
1179	Gareth Evans	2018	1	1	0	0	Hawke's Bay
1180	Tyrel Lomax	2018	56	55	0	0	Tasman
1181	Brett Cameron	2018	1	1	0	0	Canterbury
1182	Sevu Reece	2019	37	37	110	110	Waikato
1183	Luke Jacobson	2019	31	30	30	30	Waikato
1184	Braydon Ennor	2019	9	9	5	5	Canterbury
1185	Josh Ioane	2019	1	1	8	8	Otago
1186	Hoskins Sotutu	2020	14	14	10	10	Counties Manukau
1187	Caleb Clarke	2020	37	35	85	80	Auckland
1188	Tupou Vaa'i	2020	54	53	35	35	Taranaki
1189	Peter Umaga-Jensen	2020	1	1	0	0	Wellington
1190	Alex Hodgman	2020	4	4	0	0	Auckland
1191	Will Jordan	2020	63	63	280	280	Tasman
1192	Cullen Grace	2020	1	1	0	0	Canterbury
1193	Quinn Tupaea	2021	32	31	25	25	Waikato
1194	George Bower	2021	33	31	5	5	Otago
1195	Ethan Blackadder	2021	18	15	15	5	Tasman
1196	Finlay Christie	2021	28	28	5	5	Tasman
1197	Ethan de Groot	2021	47	46	25	25	Southland
1198	Samisoni Taukei'aho	2021	49	46	75	70	Waikato
1199	Josh Lord	2021	20	18	0	0	Taranaki
1200	Leicester Fainga'anuku	2022	12	12	30	30	Tasman
1201	Pita Gus Sowakula	2022	2	2	5	5	Taranaki
1202	Aidan Ross	2022	1	1	0	0	Bay of Plenty
1203	Folau Fakatava	2022	2	2	0	0	Hawke's Bay
1204	Roger Tuivasa-Sheck	2022	3	3	0	0	Auckland
1205	Fletcher Newell	2022	44	43	10	10	Canterbury
1206	Stephen Perofeta	2022	6	6	0	0	Taranaki
1207	Mark Tele'a	2022	19	19	65	65	North Harbour
1208	Emoni Narawa	2023	7	4	20	10	Bay of Plenty
1209	Tamaiti Williams	2023	27	27	25	25	Canterbury
1210	Cam Roigard	2023	26	26	85	85	Counties Manukau
1211	Samipeni Finau	2023	12	12	10	10	Waikato
1212	Shaun Stevenson	2023	1	1	5	5	North Harbour
1213	Dallas McLeod	2023	1	1	0	0	Canterbury
1214	Cortez Ratima	2024	28	25	10	10	Waikato
1215	Billy Proctor	2024	14	13	15	15	Wellington
1216	Noah Hotham	2024	4	3	5	0	Tasman
1217	George Bell	2024	4	4	5	5	Canterbury
1218	Wallace Sititi	2024	28	25	15	10	North Harbour
1219	Pasilio Tosi	2024	22	19	5	5	Bay of Plenty
1220	Sam Darry	2024	15	12	15	10	Auckland
1221	Harry Plummer	2024	1	1	0	0	Auckland
1222	Peter Lakai	2024	19	16	20	20	Wellington
1223	Ruben Love	2024	12	11	76	62	Wellington
1224	Fabian Holland	2025	18	16	5	5	Otago
1225	Christian Lio-Willie	2025	3	3	0	0	Otago
1226	Du'plessis Kirifi	2025	9	9	5	5	Wellington
1227	Ollie Norris	2025	5	3	0	0	Waikato
1228	Timoci Tavatavanawai	2025	6	3	5	0	Tasman
1229	Brodie McAlister	2025	2	2	5	5	Canterbury
1230	Simon Parker	2025	12	10	0	0	Northland
1231	Kyle Preston	2025	10	6	5	0	Wellington
1232	Leroy Carter	2025	13	11	40	25	Bay of Plenty
1233	Xavier Numia	2026	8	6	0	0	Wellington
1234	Fehi Fineanganofo	2026	3	1	0	0	Bay of Plenty
1235	Jamie Hannah	2026	2	1	0	0	Canterbury
1236	Josh Moorby	2026	9	7	35	20	Waikato
1237	Anton Segner	2026	5	3	0	0	Auckland
1238	Siale Lauaki	2026	1	0	0	0	Wellington
1239	Josh Jacomb	2026	3	0	0	0	Taranaki
1240	Bradley Slater	2026	1	0	0	0	Taranaki
1241	Semisi Tupou Ta'eiloa	2026	1	0	0	0	Southland
1242	Saula Ma'u	2026	1	0	0	0	Otago
1243	Chay Fihaki	2026	1	1	0	0	Canterbury

== See also ==
- List of All Blacks tours and series
- List of New Zealand rugby union test matches
- List of New Zealand rugby sevens internationals
- New Zealand national schoolboy rugby union team
- New Zealand national under-19 rugby union team
- New Zealand national under-20 rugby union team
- New Zealand national under-21 rugby union team
- Junior All Blacks
- New Zealand Heartland XV
- List of international rugby union families
