= Alan Wright (rugby union) =

- Full name: Alan Hercules Wright
- Born: 14 April 1914 Upper Hutt, New Zealand
- Died: 2 December 1990 (aged 76) Wellington, New Zealand
- Height: 1.79 m (5 ft 10 in)
- Weight: 89 kg (196 lb)
- School: Wellington College

Rugby union career
- Position: Wing three-quarter
International career
| Years | Team | Apps | (Points) |
| 1938 | New Zealand | | |

Alan Hercules Wright (14 April 1914 — 2 December 1990) was a New Zealand rugby union international.

Born in Upper Hutt, Wright was one of four sons of national rugby league captain Hercules Wright and a nephew of Wellington mayor Robert Wright. He attended Wellington College.

Wright, known as "Bumper", was a sturdy wing three-quarter and began playing for Wellington in 1934. He gained an All Blacks call up for the 1938 tour of Australia as a replacement for John Dick, who was suffering from measles. Despite scoring 11 tries from four uncapped matches, Wright was unable to force his way into the Test team.

== See also ==
- List of New Zealand national rugby union players
