= Alexander Pringle =

Alexander Pringle may refer to:

- Alexander Pringle (politician) (1791 – 1857)
- Alexander Pringle (rugby union)
