= Arthur Law (rugby union) =

- Full name: Arthur Douglas Law
- Born: 8 May 1904 Palmerston North, New Zealand
- Died: 4 September 1961 (aged 57) Dannevirke, New Zealand
- Height: 180 cm (5 ft 11 in)
- Weight: 81 kg (179 lb)

Rugby union career
- Position: Three–quarter
Provincial / State sides
Years	Team	Apps	(Points)
- Manawatu
- Hawke's Bay
International career
Years	Team	Apps	(Points)
1925	New Zealand		

Arthur Douglas Law (8 May 1904 – 4 September 1961) was a New Zealand international rugby union player.

Law grew up in Palmerston North and was the first All Black produced by Palmerston North Boys' High School.

A speedy three–quarter, Law debuted for Manawatu at the age of 19 and later appeared briefly with Hawke's Bay. He received an All Blacks call up for their 1925 tour of Australia and was utilised on a wing, contributing a try in the last of the three "international" fixtures against New South Wales in Sydney.

Law spent the remainder of his life farming near Dannevirke and spent a period coaching the Pirates.

== See also ==
- List of New Zealand national rugby union players
