= Ian Hammond =

- Full name: Ian Arthur Hammond
- Born: 25 October 1925 Blenheim, New Zealand
- Died: 20 May 1998 (aged 72) Blenheim, New Zealand
- Height: 178 cm (5 ft 10 in)
- School: Marlborough Boys' College

Rugby union career
- Position: Hooker
International career
Years	Team	Apps	(Points)
1952	New Zealand	1	(0)

Ian Arthur Hammond (25 October 1925 — 20 May 1998) was a New Zealand rugby union international.

Hammond was born on the Longfield estate outside Blenheim and educated at Marlborough Boys' College.

A hooker, Hammond was an understudy to Norman Wilson on the 1951 tour of Australia and made six tour appearances for the All Blacks. The following year, he became the first Marlborough player to feature in a Test match, when picked for the second Bledisloe Cup match against the Wallabies at Athletic Park, Wellington.

Hammond, a farmer by profession, retired from rugby union in 1953.

== See also ==
- List of New Zealand national rugby union players
