= Don Wright (rugby union) =

- Full name: Donald Hector Wright
- Born: 20 October 1902 Auckland, New Zealand
- Died: 26 December 1966 (aged 64) Napier, New Zealand
- Height: 170 cm (5 ft 7 in)
- Weight: 67 kg (148 lb)
- School: Auckland Grammar School

Rugby union career
- Position: Halfback
Provincial / State sides
Years	Team	Apps	(Points)
1922–25	Auckland	23	
International career
Years	Team	Apps	(Points)
1925	New Zealand		

Donald Hector Wright (20 October 1902 – 26 December 1966) was a New Zealand international rugby union player.

Wright was born in Auckland and attended Auckland Grammar School, where he played for the 1st XV in 1919.

A halfback, Wright debuted for Auckland in 1922 and was a contentious omission from the All Blacks squad for their 1924–25 northern hemisphere tour, losing out to Bill Dalley and Jimmy Mill. He however represented the All Blacks on a 1925 tour of Australia and missed only one of the tour fixtures. This proved to be his final season in first–class rugby.

== See also ==
- List of New Zealand national rugby union players
