= Claude Williams (rugby union) =

New Zealand rugby player (1916–1998)

- Full name: Claude Wright Williams
- Born: 16 May 1916 Centre Bush, New Zealand
- Died: 30 April 1998 (aged 81) Christchurch, New Zealand
- Height: 1.88 m (6 ft 2 in)
- Weight: 94 kg (207 lb)

Rugby union career
- Position: Loose forward / Lock
International career
Years	Team	Apps	(Points)
1938	New Zealand		

Claude Wright Williams (16 May 1916 — 30 April 1998) was a New Zealand rugby union international.

Williams was born in Centre Bush and educated at Timaru Boys' High School.

A forward, Williams played rugby at the University of Canterbury and was an All Blacks representative on the 1938 tour of Australia, where he featured in four uncapped matches, as a flanker and lock.

Williams served as a Royal Engineers officer during World War II and was involved in the Burma campaign, attached to the Indian Army. He was later a coach and selector of Canterbury's colts team.

The Milliken-Williams Trophy, contested annually between Timaru Boys' High School and St Andrew's College, is jointly named after Williams and Harold Milliken, an All Black who attended the latter.

== See also ==
- List of New Zealand national rugby union players
