= Frank Clark (rugby union) =

- Full name: Francis Leslie Clark
- Born: 25 September 1902 Smithfield, New Zealand
- Died: 12 November 1972 (aged 70) Auckland, New Zealand

Rugby union career
- Position: Hooker
Provincial / State sides
Years	Team	Apps	(Points)
1925–28	Canterbury	20	
International career
Years	Team	Apps	(Points)
1928	New Zealand		

Francis Leslie Clark (25 September 1902 – 12 November 1972) was a New Zealand international rugby union player.

Clark was born in Smithfield, Canterbury, and attended Christchurch Boys' High School.

A hooker, Clark was on the Canterbury team which claimed the Ranfurly Shield for the first time in 1927 and the following year made four uncapped appearances for the All Blacks. Three of these matches came in a home series with New South Wales, packing the front row with Bert Palmer, and the other was against West Coast-Buller.

Clark was an electrician by profession.

== See also ==
- List of New Zealand national rugby union players
