= Bill Elvy =

- Full name: William Lister Elvy
- Born: 2 December 1901 Christchurch, New Zealand
- Died: 29 July 1977 (aged 75) New Plymouth, New Zealand
- Height: 170 cm (5 ft 7 in)
- Weight: 73 kg (161 lb)
- School: Waltham School

Rugby union career
- Position: Wing three-quarter
Provincial / State sides
Years	Team	Apps	(Points)
- Canterbury
-	Wellington		
International career
Years	Team	Apps	(Points)
1925–26	New Zealand		

William Lister Elvy (2 December 1901 – 29 July 1977) was a New Zealand international rugby union player.

A native of Christchurch, Elvy was a Canterbury amateur welterweight boxing champion and played his rugby on the wing, with his sidestepping abilities making up for a lack of pace.

Elvy, a train driver by profession, toured New South Wales with the All Blacks in 1925 and scored two tries in the first of the unofficial Tests against the Waratahs, before missing the remaining fixtures with injury. He retained his place for their repeat tour in 1926 and scored nine tries from eight appearances.

== See also ==
- List of New Zealand national rugby union players
