= Hugh McLaren =

Hugh McLaren may refer to:

- Hugh McLaren (footballer, born 1901) (1901–1971), Scottish footballer
- Hugh McLaren (footballer, born 1926) (1926–1965), Scottish footballer
- Hugh McLaren (rugby union) (1926–1992), New Zealand international
