= Jack McNab =

Jack McNab may refer to:

- Jack McNab (rugby union, born 1895) (1895–1979), New Zealand rugby union player for Hawke's Bay and the national team
- Jack McNab (rugby union, born 1924) (1924–2009), New Zealand rugby union player for Otago and the national team
