= Mick Lomas =

- Full name: Albert Robert Lomas
- Born: 15 November 1894 Thames, New Zealand
- Died: 24 March 1975 (aged 80) Thames, New Zealand
- Height: 178 cm (5 ft 10 in)
- Weight: 89 kg (196 lb)

Rugby union career
- Position: Hooker
Provincial / State sides
Years	Team	Apps	(Points)
1920s	Auckland	13	
International career
Years	Team	Apps	(Points)
1925–26	New Zealand		

Albert Robert "Mick" Lomas (15 November 1894 — 24 March 1975) was a New Zealand international rugby union player active in the 1920s.

A fisherman by trade, Lomas hailed from the town of Thames. His early career was interrupted by World War I, during which he served with the Auckland Mounted Rifles, before making his Auckland representative debut in 1920.

Lomas was a powerful hooker and won his maiden All Blacks call up as a 30-year old in 1925. He debuted in a match against Wellington, then took part in the 1925 tour of New South Wales, playing all three "internationals". New South Wales were the country's sole representative team at the time and Australia later awarded these matches Test status. He made another Australian tour with the All Blacks in 1926 and finished his career with 15 uncapped All Black appearances.

== See also ==
- List of New Zealand national rugby union players
