= Harry Frazer =

Harry Frazer may refer to:

- Harry Fraser (director) or Frazer, American film director and screenwriter
- Harry Frazer (rugby union), New Zealand rugby union player
