= Bill Wells (rugby union) =

- Full name: William John Geddes Wells
- Born: 9 December 1867 New Plymouth, New Zealand
- Died: 11 December 1911 (aged 44) Brixton, New Zealand
- Weight: 82 kg (181 lb)

Rugby union career
- Position: Forward
Provincial / State sides
Years	Team	Apps	(Points)
1891–99	Taranaki	18	
International career
Years	Team	Apps	(Points)
1897	New Zealand		

William John Geddes Wells (9 December 1867 – 11 December 1911) was a New Zealand international rugby union player active in the 1890s.

A farmer from North Taranaki, Wells was a forward and played for Spotswood club Star. He competed with Taranaki through the 1890s and won a New Zealand call up in 1897 as a replacement for Sandy Kerr in the squad to tour Australia, where he debuted in a match against New South Wales at Sydney.

Wells was also a member of the Waitara cricket and rowing clubs.

== See also ==
- List of New Zealand national rugby union players
