= Jack Hooper (rugby union) =

- Full name: John Alan Hooper
- Born: 20 November 1913 Christchurch, New Zealand
- Died: 21 April 1976 (aged 62) Sydney, Australia
- Height: 1.78 m (5 ft 10 in)
- Weight: 70 kg (154 lb)

Rugby union career
- Position: Second five-eighth
International career
Years	Team	Apps	(Points)
1937	New Zealand	3	(0)

John Alan Hooper (20 November 1913 — 21 April 1976) was a New Zealand rugby union international.

Christchurch-born Hooper made his Canterbury debut in 1934 and after a year with West Coast returned in 1936 to play a role in Canterbury's win over the Wallabies. He played his rugby for Sunnyside.

Hooper was capped three times for the All Blacks in 1937 as a second five-eighth against the touring Springboks, then played three uncapped matches the following year during the tour of Australia.

== See also ==
- List of New Zealand national rugby union players
