= Garth Bond =

- Full name: Jack Garth Parker Bond
- Born: 24 May 1919 Carterton, New Zealand
- Died: 29 July 1999 (aged 80) Christchurch, New Zealand
- Height: 1.83 m (6 ft 0 in)
- Weight: 90 kg (198 lb)
- School: Hornby High School

Rugby union career
- Position: Prop
International career
Years	Team	Apps	(Points)
1949	New Zealand	1	(0)

Jack Garth Parker Bond (24 May 1919 – 29 July 1999) was a New Zealand rugby union international.

Born in Carterton, Bond was a great nephew of the McKenzie brothers, who included All Black William "Mac" McKenzie and rugby administrator Norm McKenzie. He attended Hornby High School while growing up in Canterbury.

During the war, Bond saw active service in Italy, then took part in the 1945–46 Victory Internationals with the "Kiwis", touring Britain, France and Germany. The team was made up of 2nd NZEF soldiers.

Bond, an Albion and Canterbury prop, was capped for the All Blacks in the 2nd Test against the Wallabies at Eden Park in 1949, as part of a team handicapped by a concurrent tour taking place in South Africa.

== See also ==
- List of New Zealand national rugby union players
