= Jack McRae =

- Full name: John Alexander McRae
- Born: 29 April 1914 Springhills, New Zealand
- Died: 24 February 1977 (aged 62) Invercargill, New Zealand
- Height: 1.78 m (5 ft 10 in)
- Weight: 87 kg (192 lb)

Rugby union career
- Position: Hooker
International career
Years	Team	Apps	(Points)
1946	New Zealand	2	(0)

John Alexander McRae (29 April 1914 — 24 February 1977) was a New Zealand rugby union international.

Born in Springhills, Southland, McRae was a hooker and played his rugby for Invercargill club Marist.

McRae gained two All Blacks caps in 1946, as a 32-year old against the touring Wallabies. He replaced an ill Harry Frazer at halftime in the 1st Test at Carisbrook and started as hooker in the 2nd Test at Eden Park.

One of McRae's sons, Ken, was a Southland hooker who played for the Junior All Blacks.

== See also ==
- List of New Zealand national rugby union players
