= Daniel Hughes (rugby union) =

New Zealand rugby union player

- Born: Daniel John Hughes; 19 September 1869 Pātea, South Taranaki District, New Zealand
- Died: 11 February 1951 (aged 81) Hāwera, South Taranaki District, New Zealand
- School: Manaia School, Taranaki
- Occupation(s): farmer, Manaia, Taranaki

Rugby union career
- Position: Hooker
Provincial / State sides
Years	Team	Apps	(Points)
1892–98	Taranaki		
International career
Years	Team	Apps	(Points)
1894	New Zealand	1	(0)

Daniel John Hughes (19 September 1869 – 11 February 1951) was a Taranaki and New Zealand rugby union player. He is number 51 on the list of New Zealand national rugby union players.

== Biography ==
Born in Pātea, Hughes was educated at Manaia School, Taranaki. Playing in the hooker position, Hughes represented the Waimate (Manaia) and later Tukapa rugby clubs as well as the Taranaki Rugby Football Union at provincial level.

At the age of 24, Hughes played one match for the New Zealand national rugby union team, against New South Wales at Lancaster Park in Christchurch on 15 September 1894. New South Wales had lost seven out of its eight games prior to the international including 6–21 in its game against Taranaki, in which Hughes played. However, New Zealand unexpectedly lost to New South Wales by 6 points to 8. Alfred Bayly who was the New Zealand captain scored a try before leaving the field injured with concussion, which seriously affected the home side. After the New South Wales loss, New Zealand did not play another match until against a touring Queensland team in 1896.

Hughes was regarded as having a powerful physique and was an accomplished wrestler.

In later life Hughes stood for the New Zealand Parliament as a New Zealand Liberal Party candidate in the Taranaki electorate. He was runner up in the 1914 New Zealand general election to Henry Okey of the Reform Party (New Zealand). Hughes was also a director of the Kaupokonui Dairy Company and a member of the Waimate Council.
