= Jack Harris (rugby union) =

- Full name: Jack Hardy Harris
- Born: 26 April 1903 Christchurch, New Zealand
- Died: 19 May 1944 (aged 41) Italy
- Height: 178 cm (5 ft 10 in)
- Weight: 73 kg (161 lb)
- School: Christchurch Boys' High
- Occupation: Wool clerk

Rugby union career
- Position: Fullback
Provincial / State sides
Years	Team	Apps	(Points)
1923–29	Canterbury	39	
International career
Years	Team	Apps	(Points)
1925	New Zealand		

Jack Hardy Harris (26 April 1903 — 19 May 1944) was a New Zealand international rugby union player.

== Biography ==
Born in Christchurch, Harris was a Canterbury representative fullback and came close to selection to the invincible 1924–25 All Blacks squad, losing out to an uncapped George Nēpia following the trials. He toured New South Wales with a second string All Blacks side in 1925 and scored a drop goal which secured their 4–0 win over the Waratahs in the second of three "internationals" (these fixtures were retrospectively considered Wallabies matches). In the 1927–28 season, Harris was a member of Canterbury's first Ranfurly Shield-winning side.

Harris, a wool clerk, was mobilised with 3rd Battalion, Canterbury Regiment, during World War II. He was later posted as a cadet officer to the 4th Battalion. On 19 May 1944, Harris died of wounds received while on active service in Italy.

== See also ==
- List of New Zealand national rugby union players
