= Nicholas Bradanovich =

- Full name: Nicholas Martin Bradanovich
- Born: 13 September 1907 Auckland, New Zealand
- Died: 14 April 1961 (aged 53) Pukekohe, New Zealand
- Weight: 64 kg (141 lb)
- School: Sacred Heart College

Rugby union career
- Position: Five-eighth
Provincial / State sides
| Years | Team | Apps | (Points) |
- Auckland
| - | Otago | | |
International career
| Years | Team | Apps | (Points) |
| 1928 | New Zealand | | |

Nicholas Martin Bradanovich (13 September 1907 — 14 April 1961) was a New Zealand international rugby union player.

Bradanovich was born in Auckland and attended Sacred Heart College.

An attacking first five-eighth, Bradanovich toured Australia with a New Zealand Universities representative side in 1927 and the following year was called up by the All Blacks for home fixtures against New South Wales, contributing 19 points from two matches as the designated goal–kicker. This included four penalty goals in the opening match of the series, to help New Zealand secure a 15–12 win. A knee injury kept him out of the third and final match. He also represented Auckland, Otago and the South Island.

Bradanovich was a dentist by profession.

== See also ==
- List of New Zealand national rugby union players
