= Robert Mathieson =

New Zealand international rugby union player

- Full name: Robert George Mathieson
- Born: 11 January 1899 Chatham Islands
- Died: 16 April 1966 (aged 67) Oamaru, New Zealand
- Weight: 71 kg (11 st 3 lb)

Rugby union career
- Position: First five-eighth / Halfback
Provincial / State sides
Years	Team	Apps	(Points)
- Otago
International career
Years	Team	Apps	(Points)
1922	New Zealand		

Robert George Mathieson (11 January 1899 – 16 April 1966) was a New Zealand international rugby union player.

Mathieson was the only All Black to have hailed from the Chatham Islands and attended Otago Boys' High School.

An inside back, Mathieson played for the Dunedin Pirates and made his representative debut for Otago at age 19. He appeared in four uncapped matches for the All Blacks in 1922, which included three fixtures on their tour of Australia. Although initially selected as a five eighth, Mathieson was utilised largely by the All Blacks as a reserve halfback.

== See also ==
- List of New Zealand national rugby union players
