= Herman Morgan =

- Full name: Herman David Morgan
- Born: 13 June 1902 Milton, New Zealand
- Died: 19 January 1969 (aged 66) Dunedin, New Zealand

Rugby union career
- Position: Wing three-quarter
Provincial / State sides
Years	Team	Apps	(Points)
1923–26	Otago	8	
International career
Years	Team	Apps	(Points)
1923	New Zealand		

Herman David Morgan (13 June 1902 — 19 January 1969) was a New Zealand international rugby union player.

Morgan was born in Milton, near Dunedin, and educated at Southland Boys High School.

Active during the 1920s, Morgan was a speedy wing three-quarter, attached to Dunedin club Pirates. He made only intermittent provincial appearances for Otago and in 1923 represented the national team against New South Wales at Athletic Park, with his try contributing to an All Blacks win.

Morgan also competed in athletics and was the 1926 New Zealand 440 yards hurdles national champion.

== See also ==
- List of New Zealand national rugby union players
