= Pat Ward (rugby union) =

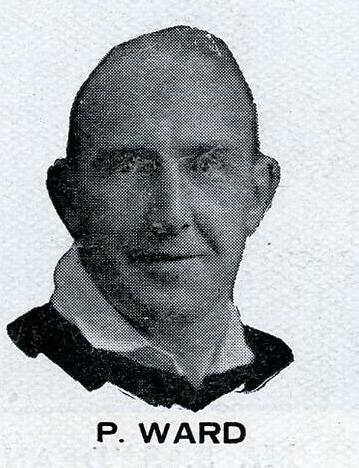
- Full name: Edward Percival Ward
- Born: 28 June 1899 Timaru, New Zealand
- Died: 25 September 1958 (aged 59) Timaru, New Zealand
- Height: 175 cm (5 ft 9 in)
- Weight: 98 kg (216 lb)

Rugby union career
- Position: Forward
Provincial / State sides
Years	Team	Apps	(Points)
- South Canterbury
-	Canterbury		
-	Taranaki		
International career
Years	Team	Apps	(Points)
1928	New Zealand		

Edward Percival Ward (28 June 1899 — 25 September 1958) was a New Zealand international rugby union player.

Ward was born in Timaru and attended the Waimataitai school.

A strongly built utility forward, Ward began in provincial rugby at South Canterbury in 1921. He next played with Canterbury and then in 1927 featured for his third union when he was transferred to Taranaki for work. It was from Taranaki that he won an All Blacks call up in 1928, as their sole representative on the tour of South Africa, where he made 10 uncapped appearances. He captained Taranaki against the 1930 British Lions.

== See also ==
- List of New Zealand national rugby union players
