= Harrison Rowley =

- Full name: Harrison Cotton Banks Rowley
- Born: 15 June 1924 Cromwell, New Zealand
- Died: 16 December 1956 (aged 32) Waimate, New Zealand
- Height: 1.85 m (6 ft 1 in)
- Weight: 90 kg (198 lb)
- School: Southland Boys' High School
- Occupation: Stock buyer

Rugby union career
- Position: Loose forward
International career
Years	Team	Apps	(Points)
1949	New Zealand	1	(0)

Harrison Cotton Banks Rowley (15 June 1924 — 16 December 1956) was a New Zealand rugby union international.

Born in Cromwell, Rowley was educated at Southland Boys' High School.

Rowley, a loose forward, made his solitary Test appearance for the All Blacks in a win over the Wallabies at Eden Park in 1949. He had to spend most of the match on the wing, with the backline reshuffled after fullback Jack Kelly was injured.

A stock buyer by profession, Rowley often relocated during his rugby career and as a result made appearances for four unions, Bush, Wanganui, Thames Valley and North Auckland.

Rowley died in 1956 of injuries received when his car collided with a goods train at a crossing.

== See also ==
- List of New Zealand national rugby union players
