= Trevor Berghan =

New Zealand international rugby union player (1914-1998)

- Born: 14 July 1914 Houhora, New Zealand
- Died: 23 September 1998 (aged 84) Auckland, New Zealand
- Height: 1.72 m (5 ft 8 in)
- Weight: 74 kg (163 lb)
- School: Rotorua Boys' High School
- University: University of Otago
- Occupation: Dentist

Rugby union career
- Position: First five-eighth
Provincial / State sides
| Years | Team | Apps | (Points) |
| 1937–40 | Otago | 21 | |
International career
| Years | Team | Apps | (Points) |
| 1938 | New Zealand | 3 | (0) |

Trevor Berghan (13 July 1914 – 23 September 1998) was a New Zealand rugby union player. A first five-eighth, Berghan represented Otago at a provincial level, and was a member of the New Zealand national side, the All Blacks, on their 1938 tour of Australia. He played six matches for the All Blacks on that tour, including three internationals.

Berghan studied at the University of Otago, graduating with a Bachelor of Dental Surgery in 1941. He was commissioned as a lieutenant in the New Zealand Dental Corps in June 1941, and later promoted to captain. He was seconded to the Royal New Zealand Navy with the rank of temporary surgeon lieutenant (D) in July 1943.
