= Don Stevenson (rugby union) =

New Zealand rugby union player (1903–1962)

- Full name: Donald Robert Louis Stevenson
- Born: 3 February 1903 Dunedin, New Zealand
- Died: 11 April 1962 (aged 59) Doncaster, England

Rugby union career
- Position: Fullback
Provincial / State sides
| Years | Team | Apps | (Points) |
| 1924–30 | Otago | 12 | |
International career
| Years | Team | Apps | (Points) |
| 1926 | New Zealand | | |

Donald Robert Louis Stevenson (3 February 1903 – 11 April 1962) was a New Zealand international rugby union player of the 1920s. He later became a doctor in England.

Born in Dunedin, Stevenson attended both Otago Boys' High School and Napier Boys' High School, before undertaking medical studies at the University of Otago. He was a varsity rugby player and twice toured Australia with New Zealand Universities. In addition to rugby, Stevenson was active in varsity athletics and held an Otago record for the long jump.

Stevenson, a utility back, was utilised as a fullback by the All Blacks on a 1926 tour of Australia. He was below his best due to injury and had to return home mid tour, after three uncapped appearances.

== See also ==
- List of New Zealand national rugby union players
