= David Dickson (rugby union) =

New Zealand international rugby union player (1900–1978)

- Full name: David McKee Dickson
- Born: 25 September 1900 Temuka, New Zealand
- Died: 19 April 1978 (aged 77) Christchurch, New Zealand
- Height: 183 cm (6 ft 0 in)
- Weight: 86 kg (190 lb)

Rugby union career
- Position: Loose forward
Provincial / State sides
Years	Team	Apps	(Points)
- Otago
- Canterbury
International career
Years	Team	Apps	(Points)
1925	New Zealand		

David McKee Dickson (25 September 1900 – 19 April 1978) was a New Zealand international rugby union player.

Dickson was born in Temuka and attended Christchurch Boys' High School, where he had two years in the first XV. He combined rugby with medical studies at Otago University, which made him unavailable to try out for the 1924–25 tour. A powerful back row forward, Dickson toured Australia with the All Blacks in 1925 and featured in all three of their matches against New South Wales. He was also utilised as an occasional goal–kicker during the tour.

After retiring, Dickson became a referee and officiated a Springboks match against Manawatu in 1937.

Dickson was a surgeon by profession.

== See also ==
- List of New Zealand national rugby union players
