= Len Williams (rugby union) =

- Full name: Alexander Leonard Williams
- Born: 18 October 1898 Middlemarch, New Zealand
- Died: 13 June 1972 (aged 73) Dunedin, New Zealand
- Height: 185 cm (6 ft 1 in)
- Weight: 93 kg (205 lb)

Rugby union career
- Position: Lock forward
Provincial / State sides
Years	Team	Apps	(Points)
- Otago
International career
Years	Team	Apps	(Points)
1922–23	New Zealand		

Alexander Leonard Williams (18 October 1898 – 13 June 1972) was a New Zealand international rugby union player.

Born in Middlemarch, Williams was a solidly–built Otago forward, noted for his line out abilities.

Williams played for Kaikorai and represented the All Blacks in nine uncapped matches, four of which came on a tour of New South Wales in 1922, and reportedly came close to selection for their 1924–25 northern hemisphere tour. His career was ended by a serious leg injury suffered in a club fixture in 1925.

After retiring as a player, Williams served for many years on the Kaikorai committee, including a stint as president, and was also an administrator with the Otago Rugby Football Union.

== See also ==
- List of New Zealand national rugby union players
