= Jimmy Sinclair (rugby union) =

New Zealand medical doctor and rugby union player

- Full name: Robert Gemmell Burnett Sinclair
- Born: 31 August 1896 New Plymouth, New Zealand
- Died: 27 June 1932 (aged 35) Wellington, New Zealand
- School: New Plymouth BHS
- University: University of Otago
- Occupation: Doctor

Rugby union career
- Position: Fullback
Provincial / State sides
Years	Team	Apps	(Points)
1922–23	Otago		
1924	Taranaki		
International career
Years	Team	Apps	(Points)
1923	New Zealand		

Robert Gemmell Burnett Sinclair (31 August 1896 – 27 June 1932) was a New Zealand medical doctor and international rugby union player of the 1920s.

== Biography ==
Sinclair was born in New Plymouth and attended New Plymouth Boys' High School from 1909 to 1915, before pursuing a medical degree at Otago University, where he made his name playing varsity rugby. His medical studies were interrupted by World War I, during which he served as an officer with the Taranaki Infantry Battalion.

A tall fullback, Sinclair was the first All Black of that position to be selected from Otago University. His kicking game was his greatest asset and the All Blacks utilised him as a goal–kicker in his two international appearances, both uncapped home fixtures against New South Wales. He contributed 23 points from the two matches.

Sinclair had a medical practice in Hawera and was also an anaesthetist at the local hospital.

In 1932, Sinclair fell ill with appendicitis and died of post surgery complication on 27 June, aged 35.

== See also ==
- List of New Zealand national rugby union players
