= John O'Brien (rugby union) =

- Born: 28 October 1871 Greymouth, New Zealand
- Died: 25 April 1946 (aged 74) Auckland, New Zealand

Rugby union career
- Position: Forward
Provincial / State sides
Years	Team	Apps	(Points)
- West Coast
- Wellington
International career
Years	Team	Apps	(Points)
1901	New Zealand		

John O'Brien (28 October 1871 – 25 April 1946) was a New Zealand international rugby union player.

O'Brien was born in Greymouth and was the son of a local hotel keeper.

A forward, O'Brien played his early rugby for West Coast club Oriental and in 1898 linked up with Athletic in Wellington, from where he gained his New Zealand call up. He made his New Zealand debut against Wellington in 1901, a warm up match prior to their "international" with New South Wales, for which he wasn't to be selected.

O'Brien, a police sergeant, was married with two daughters and two sons.

== See also ==
- List of New Zealand national rugby union players
