= Phil Jacob =

- Full name: John Phillip le Grande Jacob
- Born: 19 May 1877 Marton, New Zealand
- Died: 3 November 1909 (aged 32) Stratford, New Zealand

Rugby union career
- Position: Wing three-quarter
Provincial / State sides
Years	Team	Apps	(Points)
1894	Wanganui		
1897–98	Taranaki		
1901	Wellington		
1901–02	Southland		
International career
Years	Team	Apps	(Points)
1901	New Zealand		

John Phillip le Grande Jacob (19 May 1877 – 3 November 1909) was a New Zealand international rugby union player.

Jacob was born in Marton and educated at Wanganui Collegiate, where he was a first XV player for three seasons.

An attacking wing three-quarter, Jacob was a regular try scorer for his provinces, which numbered four as he had a well travelled career. He was New Zealand representative for two uncapped matches in 1901, debuting against Wellington. His other appearance came against New South Wales at Athletic Park, and he contributed two tries in a 20–3 win.

Jacob died of a lung haemorrhage at the age of 32 in 1909.

== See also ==
- List of New Zealand national rugby union players
