= Fred Hobbs (rugby union) =

- Full name: Frederick George Hobbs
- Born: 18 March 1920 Christchurch, New Zealand
- Died: 15 October 1985 (aged 65) Christchurch, New Zealand
- Height: 1.87 m (6 ft 2 in)
- Weight: 92 kg (203 lb)

Rugby union career
- Position: Flanker / Lock
International career
Years	Team	Apps	(Points)
1947	New Zealand		

Frederick George Hobbs (18 March 1920 — 15 October 1985) was a New Zealand rugby union international.

Hobbs was born in Christchurch and educated at Christchurch West High School.

Active in the 1940s, Hobbs was a forward and made his Canterbury debut at age 20, before his career was stalled by wartime army service. He was vice captain of the All Blacks team on the 1947 tour of Australia, where he featured in six uncapped matches, three as captain. Injuries ruled him out of selection for both of the Test matches.

== See also ==
- List of New Zealand national rugby union players
