= Jockey Ford =

New Zealand international rugby union player

- Full name: William August Ford
- Born: 25 August 1895 Christchurch, New Zealand
- Died: 7 July 1959 (aged 63) Christchurch, New Zealand
- Height: 165 cm (5 ft 5 in)
- Weight: 63 kg (139 lb)

Rugby union career
- Position: Wing
Provincial / State sides
Years	Team	Apps	(Points)
- Canterbury
International career
Years	Team	Apps	(Points)
1921–23	New Zealand		

William August "Jockey" Ford (25 August 1895 – 7 July 1959) was a New Zealand international rugby union player.

== Rugby union career ==
Ford was a diminutive wing three–quarter, known by the nickname "Jockey", and played his rugby in Christchurch. He was in the New Zealand Services team which undertook tours of the UK and South Africa in 1919. A regular on the wing for Canterbury, Ford scored the decisive try in the province's win over the 1921 Springboks.

=== International ===
Ford represented the All Blacks in nine uncapped matches, after first gaining selection in 1921 for a home fixture against New South Wales (NSW). He received further opportunities in 1922 as a member the All Blacks squad for a tour of NSW, where he made four uncapped appearances. On their return to New Zealand, Ford scored a hat–trick for the All Blacks in a fixture against Manawatu-Wellington at Palmerston North. His final All Blacks match came against NSW in 1923.

== See also ==
- List of New Zealand national rugby union players
