= Jock Wells =

- Full name: John Wells
- Born: 4 January 1908 Onetea, New Zealand
- Died: 7 January 1994 (aged 86) Wellington, New Zealand
- Height: 1.78 m (5 ft 10 in)
- Weight: 90 kg (198 lb)
- School: Dargaville High School
- Occupation: Bank officer

Rugby union career
- Position: Flanker
International career
Years	Team	Apps	(Points)
1936	New Zealand	2	(0)

John "Jock" Wells (4 January 1908 — 7 January 1994) was a New Zealand rugby union international.

Wells was raised at Onetea in the Tangowahine Valley, Northland, attending Dargaville High School.

A flanker, Wells played his early provincial rugby for North Auckland, debuting at age 20. He relocated to the capital on a job transfer in 1933 and started playing for Wellington the next year. In 1936, Wells was capped twice by the All Blacks, for both Tests against the touring Wallabies. He captained Wellington's Athletic club to the 1936 and 1937 Jubilee Cup titles.

Wells served as president of the Wellington Rugby Football Union.

== See also ==
- List of New Zealand national rugby union players
