= Len Wilson =

- Full name: Alfred Leonard Wilson
- Born: 15 June 1927 Dunfermline, Scotland
- Died: 26 August 2009 (aged 82) Invercargill, New Zealand
- Height: 178 cm (5 ft 10 in)

Rugby union career
- Position: First five-eighth
International career
Years	Team	Apps	(Points)
1951	New Zealand		

Alfred Leonard Wilson (15 June 1927 — 26 August 2009) was a New Zealand rugby union international.

Born in Scotland, Wilson was a first five-eighth and toured Australia with the All Blacks in 1951, featuring in seven uncapped matches. He was picked as an understudy to Laurie Haig and didn't get to play any of the Tests.

Wilson played his provincial rugby with Southland, debuting as a 22 year old. He made a total of 58 provincial appearances for Southland and captained the side which beat the touring Wallabies in 1952.

== See also ==
- List of New Zealand national rugby union players
