= Charles Quaid =

New Zealand rugby union player

- Born: Charles Edward Quaid; 17 August 1908 Christchurch, New Zealand
- Died: 18 December 1984 (aged 76) Upper Hutt, New Zealand
- Height: 1.75 m (5 ft 9 in)
- Weight: 86 kg (190 lb)
- Occupation: Shopkeeper

Rugby union career
- Position: Hooker
Provincial / State sides
Years	Team	Apps	(Points)
1931	Canterbury	3	
1932–34	Wellington	9	
1935–39	Otago	41	
International career
Years	Team	Apps	(Points)
1938	New Zealand	2	(0)

Charles Edward Quaid (17 August 1908 – 18 December 1984) was a New Zealand rugby union player. A hooker, Quaid represented Canterbury, Wellington, and Otago at a provincial level. He was a member of the New Zealand national side, the All Blacks, on their 1938 tour of Australia on which he played four matches, including two internationals.

Quaid died at Upper Hutt on 18 December 1984, and was buried at Akatarawa Cemetery.
