= Robert Souter =

- Born: 5 January 1905 Cambusnethan, Scotland
- Died: 1 January 1976 (aged 70) Auckland, New Zealand
- Height: 170 cm (5 ft 7 in)
- Weight: 80 kg (176 lb)

Rugby union career
- Position: Hooker / Prop
Provincial / State sides
| Years | Team | Apps | (Points) |
| 1927–31 | Otago | 26 | |
International career
| Years | Team | Apps | (Points) |
| 1929 | New Zealand | | |

Robert Souter (5 January 1905 — 1 January 1976) was a New Zealand international rugby union player.

Born in Cambusnethan, Scotland, Souter immigrated to New Zealand as a teenager in 1919.

Souter was a forward, short but sturdy and fast in the open. He played his club rugby for the Dunedin-based Alhambra and competed for Otago at provincial level, gaining 26 caps. In 1929, Souter won All Blacks selection as a hooker on the tour of Australia, where he made four uncapped appearances.

== See also ==
- List of New Zealand national rugby union players
