= Peter Johns (rugby union) =

- Full name: Peter Arthur Johns
- Born: 16 March 1944 (age 82) New Plymouth, New Zealand
- Height: 180 cm (5 ft 11 in)

Rugby union career
- Position: Centre
International career
Years	Team	Apps	(Points)
1968	New Zealand		

Peter Arthur Johns (born 16 March 1944) is a New Zealand former rugby union international.

Johns was born in New Plymouth and educated at New Plymouth Boys' High School.

Based out of Waiouru Military Camp, Johns played centre on the Wanganui-King Country side which beat the 1966 British Lions and subsequently earned New Zealand Junior selection.

Johns was a member of the All Blacks squad for the 1968 tour of Australia and featured in six uncapped matches.

== See also ==
- List of New Zealand national rugby union players
