= Arnold Perry =

Arnold Perry OBE VRD
- Born: 18 April 1899 Wellington, New Zealand
- Died: 2 October 1977 (aged 78) Cherry Farm, Dunedin, New Zealand

Rugby union career
- Position: Five-eighth
Provincial / State sides
Years	Team	Apps	(Points)
1919–1923	Otago		
International career
Years	Team	Apps	(Points)
1923	New Zealand		

Arnold Perry OBE VRD (18 April 1899 – 2 October 1977) was a New Zealand international rugby union player.

Perry was educated at Wellington College and Otago University, where he played Varsity "A" rugby from 1917 to 1924 as a five-eighth. He debuted for Otago in 1919 and four years later received an All Blacks call up for a fixture against New South Wales at Christchurch, which remained his only international appearance. During the 1930s, Perry remained involved in rugby as a selector and president for Otago Rugby Union.

A graduate of Otago Medical School, Perry practised medicine in Dunedin for many years. He served as a ship's surgeon on HMS Achilles during World War II and later in the conflict was stationed at Devonport Naval Base. After the war, Perry remained in England briefly and became surgeon captain in the Naval Reserve. He was made an Officer of the Order of the British Empire (OBE) in 1946 for his wartime service. In 1953, he was awarded the Queen Elizabeth II Coronation Medal.

== See also ==
- List of New Zealand national rugby union players
