= Topi Robinson =

- Full name: Topi Patuki Robinson
- Born: 1 January 1906 Little River, New Zealand
- Died: 2 August 1975 (aged 69) Wairoa, New Zealand

Rugby union career
- Position: Loose forward
Provincial / State sides
Years	Team	Apps	(Points)
1927–30	Canterbury	21	
International career
Years	Team	Apps	(Points)
1928	New Zealand		

Topi Patuki Robinson (1 January 1906 – 2 August 1975), also known as Toby Robinson, was a New Zealand international rugby union player.

One of eight siblings, Robinson hailed from Little River on the Banks Peninsular and was a brother of Canterbury/New Zealand Maori representative player Tom Robinson.

Robinson, a loose forward, played with rural club Te Kotahitanga and represented Canterbury.

In 1928, Robinson played three uncapped home fixtures for the All Blacks, scoring three tries. He marked his debut against New South Wales in Dunedin with a try and contributed a further two tries in a later fixture against West Coast-Buller.

Robinson was a great-great uncle of rugby player turned television presenter Melodie Robinson.

== See also ==
- List of New Zealand national rugby union players
