= Jim Baird (rugby union) =

NZ international rugby union player (1893–1917)

- Full name: James Alexander Steenson Baird
- Born: 17 December 1893 Dunedin, New Zealand
- Died: 7 June 1917 (aged 23) Bailleul, France
- Height: 5 ft 9 in (175 cm)
- Weight: 168 lb (76 kg)
- School: Caversham School

Rugby union career
- Position: Centre
Provincial / State sides
| Years | Team | Apps | (Points) |
| 1913 | Otago | 2 | |
International career
| Years | Team | Apps | (Points) |
| 1913 | New Zealand | 1 | (0) |

James Alexander Steenson Baird (17 December 1893 — 7 June 1917) was a New Zealand international rugby union player and New Zealand Expeditionary Force soldier. He died aged 23 in World War I.

== Biography ==
Baird was born in Dunedin, where he attended Caversham School.

=== Rugby union ===
A centre three-quarter, Baird played his club rugby with Dunedin club Zingari-Richmond and had made only two representative appearances for Otago the year he won an All Blacks call up in 1913. He was a replacement player for Eric Cockroft in the side to play Australia at Carisbrook, selected over others as he was already in Dunedin. The All Blacks won 25–13 and he kept his place for the third Test in Christchurch, but had to pull out with a hand injury. He didn't play any rugby in 1914 due to illness.

=== War service ===
Baird enlisted in the army on 29 June 1916 and served with the Otago Infantry Regiment. He died on 7 June 1917 at the No. 1 Australian Casualty Clearing Station in France from wounds received earlier that day during the Battle of Messines.

== See also ==
- List of New Zealand national rugby union players
