= Terry Lockington =

- Full name: Terence McClatchey Lockington
- Born: 26 March 1913 Waihi, New Zealand
- Died: 8 September 2001 (aged 88) Auckland, New Zealand
- Height: 1.88 m (6 ft 2 in)
- Weight: 89 kg (196 lb)

Rugby union career
- Position: Flanker
International career
Years	Team	Apps	(Points)
1936	New Zealand		

Terence McClatchey Lockington (26 March 1913 — 8 September 2001) was a New Zealand rugby union international.

Born in Waihi, Lockington attended Waihi High School and later Auckland Grammar School, where he was a member of the 1929 1st XV. He played his post school rugby for Grammar and made his Auckland debut in 1934.

Lockington, a loose forward, made an uncapped All Blacks appearance in 1936 against South Canterbury, a fixture taking place during the Bledisloe Cup. After scoring a first half try, he broke his hand, ruling him out of Test contention.

== See also ==
- List of New Zealand national rugby union players
