= William McClymont =

- Full name: William Graham McClymont
- Born: 22 June 1905 Lawrence, New Zealand
- Died: 21 May 1970 (aged 64) Waitati, New Zealand
- Weight: 76 kg (168 lb)
- University: University of Otago
- Occupation: Teacher / Historian

Rugby union career
- Position: Wing three-quarter
Provincial / State sides
| Years | Team | Apps | (Points) |
- Otago
International career
| Years | Team | Apps | (Points) |
| 1928 | New Zealand | | |

William Graham McClymont (22 June 1905 – 21 May 1970) was a New Zealand educator, historian and international rugby union player of the 1920s.

== Biography ==
Born in Lawrence, Otago, McClymont attended Tokomairiro District High School and the University of Otago, where he graduated with honours in history. He played varsity rugby mainly as a wing three-quarter and in 1927 made his representative debut for Otago. In 1928, McClymont appeared for the All Blacks in all three of their home fixtures against New South Wales, which were Australia's only representative team at the time.

McClymont, a teacher by profession, held positions at Otago Boys' High School both sides of World War II, during which he served with the Second NZEF in Italy. He later published a book on war history entitled To Greece. After retiring from high school teaching in 1961, McClymont continued as a lecturer at the University of Otago.

== See also ==
- List of New Zealand national rugby union players
