= Brian Killeen =

- Full name: Brian Alexander Killeen
- Born: 13 April 1911 Wellington, New Zealand
- Died: 9 March 1993 (aged 81) Auckland, New Zealand
- Height: 1.80 m (5 ft 11 in)
- Weight: 77 kg (170 lb)
- School: Wellington College

Rugby union career
- Position: Five-eighth
International career
Years	Team	Apps	(Points)
1936	New Zealand	1	(0)

Brian Alexander Killeen (13 April 1911 — 9 March 1993) was a New Zealand rugby union international.

Killeen, known as "Shorty", was born in Wellington and educated at Wellington College.

Primarily a second five eighth, Killeen was an attacking player who started out in the Hutt third grade team, from where he was spotted by Bert Cooke and got promoted straight into the firsts. He played provincial rugby for Wellington until moving to Auckland in 1935, making an immediate impression with four tries on debut against Waikato.

In 1936, Killeen gained an All Blacks cap against the Wallabies at Athletic Park, Wellington.

Killeen, who captained Auckland against the touring Springboks in 1937, was a bank employee and due to work transfers represented a further two unions, Taranaki in 1939 and Golden Bay-Motueka from 1940 to 1941.

== See also ==
- List of New Zealand national rugby union players
