= Scotty Baird =

New Zealand international rugby union player

- Full name: David Lindsay Baird
- Born: 26 July 1895 Gore, New Zealand
- Died: 26 July 1943 (aged 48)
- Height: 183 cm (6 ft 0 in)
- Occupation: Coal miner

Rugby union career
- Position: Wing-forward
Provincial / State sides
Years	Team	Apps	(Points)
- Southland
International career
Years	Team	Apps	(Points)
1920	New Zealand		

David Lindsay "Scotty" Baird (26 July 1895 — 26 July 1943) was a New Zealand international rugby union player.

Born in Gore, Baird was a wing-forward, selected by the All Blacks to tour New South Wales in 1920. He made nine uncapped appearances for the All Blacks that year, debuting in a warm-up match against Auckland, before playing all three "internationals" against the NSW Waratahs, which at the time were Australia's sole representative team. On his return to New Zealand, Baird featured for the All Blacks as a centre in a match against Wellington.

Baird, an Invercargill Star player, captained the Southland team that beat Wellington in 1920 to claim the Ranfurly Shield, marking the first occasion a South Island union had held the shield.

In 1943, Baird died in a coal mining accident at Nightcaps.

== See also ==
- List of New Zealand national rugby union players
