= Johnny Leeson =

- Full name: John Leeson
- Born: 15 November 1909 Morrinsville, New Zealand
- Died: 11 March 1960 (aged 50) Morrinsville, New Zealand
- Height: 1.75 m (5 ft 9 in)
- Weight: 82 kg (181 lb)
- Occupation: Farmer

Rugby union career
- Position: Prop
International career
Years	Team	Apps	(Points)
1934	New Zealand		

John Leeson (15 November 1909 — 11 March 1960) was a New Zealand rugby union international.

Leeson came from the town of Morrinsville in Waikato and attended Morrinsville District High School.

A product of the Kereone club, Leeson appeared at representative level for Waikato, along with his brothers George and Ted. He played for Waikato-King Country-Thames Valley against the 1930 and 1937 British Lions.

Leeson was an All Black on the 1934 tour of Australia, featuring in four uncapped matches.

Playing first-class rugby until the age of 44, lastly for NZ Harlequins, Leeson was a farmer in the Morrinsville district.

== See also ==
- List of New Zealand national rugby union players
