= Howard Levien =

- Full name: Howard Joseph Levien
- Born: 6 September 1934 Taumarunui, New Zealand
- Died: 28 December 2008 (aged 74) Paeroa, New Zealand
- Height: 175 cm (5 ft 9 in)
- School: Taumarunui High School
- University: Otago University

Rugby union career
- Position(s): Second five-eighth Three-quarter
International career
Years	Team	Apps	(Points)
1957	New Zealand		

Howard Joseph Levien (6 September 1934 — 28 December 2008) was a New Zealand rugby union international.

Levien attended Taumarunui High School and played junior rugby for King Country with Colin Meads. He studied dentistry at the University of Otago and broke into the Otago representative side in 1956.

A pacy back, Levien made eight uncapped appearances for the All Blacks during the 1957 tour of Australia, scoring nine tries. This included a hat-trick against Riverina. His career ended four months later when a motor cycle he was riding struck a Dunedin bus, which necessitated the amputation of his left leg below the knee.

== See also ==
- List of New Zealand national rugby union players
