= Tom Metcalfe =

- Full name: Thomas Charles Metcalfe
- Born: 13 May 1909 Invercargill, New Zealand
- Died: 26 May 1969 (aged 60) Dunedin, New Zealand
- Height: 1.80 m (5 ft 11 in)
- Weight: 87 kg (192 lb)

Rugby union career
- Position: Loose forward
International career
Years	Team	Apps	(Points)
1931–32	New Zealand	2	(0)

Thomas Charles Metcalfe (13 May 1909 — 26 May 1969) was a New Zealand rugby union international.

Born in Invercargill, Metcalfe played with the city's Pirates club and made a total of 63 appearances for Southland in representative rugby. He was captain of the Southland team which defeated the touring Wallabies in 1931.

Metcalfe, a loose forward, was capped twice by the All Blacks during the early 1930s. He debuted in the back row against the Wallabies at Eden Park in 1931, which was the last occasion that the All Blacks packed a 2–3–2 scrum in a Test match. The following year, Metcalfe was on the tour of Australia, where he played in the 1st Test in Sydney.

== See also ==
- List of New Zealand national rugby union players
