= Don Clark (rugby union) =

- Full name: Donald William Clark
- Born: 22 February 1940 (age 86) Cromwell, New Zealand
- Height: 1.83 m (6 ft 0 in)
- Weight: 90 kg (198 lb)
- School: Timaru Boys' High School
- Notable relative: Kerry Clark (cousin)
- Occupation: Farmer

Rugby union career
- Position: Flanker
Provincial / State sides
Years	Team	Apps	(Points)
1960–1967	Otago	79	
International career
Years	Team	Apps	(Points)
1964	New Zealand	2	(0)

Donald William Clark (born 22 February 1940) is a New Zealand former rugby union international.

Clark was born in Cromwell, Central Otago, and grew up in the small settlement of Tarras, as the second eldest of four brothers. He attended Timaru Boys' High School.

Debuting for Otago at the age of 20, Clark was a loose forward and made a total of 79 provincial appearances with Otago, for which his brothers Colin and Tony also played. He was capped twice by the All Blacks in the 1964 Bledisloe Cup series, at Carisbrook and Lancaster Park, with both matches won by New Zealand. A member of the Otago side that beat the 1966 British Lions, Clark's career ended the following year, as the result of a farm accident.

Clark's cousin Kerry won a gold medal in lawn bowls at the 1974 British Commonwealth Games.

== See also ==
- List of New Zealand national rugby union players
