= Tim Mason (rugby union) =

- Full name: David Frank Mason
- Born: 21 November 1923 Wellington, New Zealand
- Died: 3 July 1981 (aged 57) Johannesburg, South Africa
- Height: 1.75 m (5 ft 9 in)
- Weight: 74 kg (163 lb)
- School: Wellington College
- Notable relative: Bruce Mason (brother)
- Occupation: Insurance executive

Rugby union career
- Position: Wing
International career
Years	Team	Apps	(Points)
1947	New Zealand	1	(3)

David Frank "Tim" Mason (21 November 1923 — 3 July 1981) was a New Zealand rugby union international.

Born in Wellington, Mason was the younger brother of playwright Bruce Mason and attended Wellington College.

Mason, a wing three-quarter from Wellington College Old Boys, was on the 1947 tour of Australia with the All Blacks and scored a try in his solitary Test appearance, a 27–14 win over the Wallabies at the SCG. He took the field as a first-half replacement for injured winger Wally Argus and got his try on full-time, gathering a kick from Bob Scott.

In 1948, Mason relocated to South Africa, where he played for Union (Cape Town) and Western Province. He remained in South Africa for the remainder of his life, working as an insurance executive.

== See also ==
- List of New Zealand national rugby union players
