= Craig Mackenzie =

New Zealand rugby union player and cricketer

- Full name: Robert Henry Craig Mackenzie
- Born: 17 February 1904 Wellington, New Zealand
- Died: 19 July 1993 (aged 89) Wellington, New Zealand
- School: Wellington College

Rugby union career
- Position: First five-eighth
Provincial / State sides
Years	Team	Apps	(Points)
1925–29	Wellington		
International career
Years	Team	Apps	(Points)
1928	New Zealand		

Robert Henry Craig Mackenzie (17 February 1904 – 19 July 1993) was a New Zealand rugby union player who made two uncapped appearances for the All Blacks in 1928. He was also a first-class cricketer for Wellington in the 1929/30 season.

== See also ==
- List of New Zealand national rugby union players
- List of Wellington representative cricketers
