= Keith Siddells =

- Full name: Stanley Keith Siddells
- Born: 16 July 1897 Wellington, New Zealand
- Died: 3 March 1979 (aged 81) Pahiatua, New Zealand
- Height: 185 cm (6 ft 1 in)
- Weight: 87 kg (192 lb)
- School: Whanganui Collegiate
- University: Victoria University
- Occupation: Lawyer

Rugby union career
- Position: Fullback / Wing
Provincial / State sides
Years	Team	Apps	(Points)
1914–15	Whanganui		
1920–22	Wellington		
1923–27	Bush		
International career
Years	Team	Apps	(Points)
1921	New Zealand	1	(0)

Stanley Keith Siddells (16 July 1897 — 3 March 1979) was a New Zealand international rugby union player.

== Biography ==
Born in Wellington, Siddells was educated at Whanganui Collegiate and made his provincial debut for Whanganui as a 17 year old. He served with the New Zealand Rifle Brigade in World War I.

Siddells, primarily a fullback, got picked as a wing three-quarter for his solitary All Blacks appearance, tasked with containing Springboks wing Attie van Heerden in a Test match at Athletic Park, Wellington in 1921. The match finished in a 0–0 draw, with Siddells prevented from opening the scoring when the ball got stuck in a puddle of water and he was unable to dribble it forward. He earned another call up the following year, but couldn't make the trip to Australia.

A graduate of Victoria University, Siddells was a lawyer by profession and served as mayor of the town of Pahiatua, near Palmerston North. He was a commandant of an internment camp during World War II.

== See also ==
- List of New Zealand national rugby union players
