= Jock Turnbull =

- Full name: John Steele Turnbull
- Born: 2 October 1898 East Taieri, New Zealand
- Died: 18 January 1947 (aged 48) Mosgiel, New Zealand

Rugby union career
- Position: Forward
Provincial / State sides
Years	Team	Apps	(Points)
	Otago	8	
International career
Years	Team	Apps	(Points)
1921	New Zealand		

John Steele Turnbull (2 October 1898 – 18 January 1947) was a New Zealand international rugby union player.

Turnbull was born in East Taieri and attended East Taieri School while growing up in the Otago town. Enlisting at the age of 20, Turnbull served with mounted forces in Palestine during World War I.

A loose forward, Turnbull played rugby for Kaikorai after the war, as his hometown were no longer fielding a team. He wasn't always selected for Otago, but still managed an All Blacks appearance in 1921, substituting Phillippe Cabot during the second half against New South Wales in Dunedin. The All Blacks were effectively a New Zealand "A" outfit as their first team players were on a concurrent tour of South Africa. He retired in his early 20s.

== See also ==
- List of New Zealand national rugby union players
