= Reg Bell (sportsperson, born 1893) =

New Zealand cricketer

Personal information
- Full name: Reginald Clive Bell
- Born: 1 January 1893 (Note: Bell's birth date is given as 11 December 1894 by both CricInfo and CricketArchive. This would make him 65 at the time of his death. The All Blacks give it as 1 January 1893 which would make him 67 when he died. This tallies with the press release from the New Zealand Press association printed in The Press in November 1960.); Burnie, Tasmania, Australia
- Died: 19 November 1960 (aged 67); Taieri River, Otago, New Zealand
- Batting: Left-handed

Domestic team information
- Years: Team
- 1914/15–1920/21: Otago
- Source: ESPNcricinfo, 5 May 2016

Reginald Clive Bell (1 January 1893 – 19 November 1960) was a New Zealand rugby union player and cricketer. He was a member of the New Zealand national rugby side, the All Blacks, in 1922, playing eight matches. He played four first-class matches for Otago between the 1914–15 and 1920–21 seasons.

Bell was born in Australia, at Burnie in Tasmania in 1894. After moving to New Zealand he played both cricket and rugby in Dunedin, for Carisbrook Cricket Club as a batsman and Pirates F.C. as a fullback. He made his first-class cricket debut for Otago in a December 1915 Plunket Shield match against Canterbury at Lancaster Park, scoring five and 11 in his two innings. Two matches in early 1915 against Wellington and Southland were followed by his final top-level cricket appearance against the touring Australians in March 1921.

Later in 1921 Bell made his senior rugby debut at the age of 28, playing for Otago against the touring South African side. He kicked Otago's only points in the match. Considered an attacking fullback, Bell played for Otago the following season and toured Australia with the All Blacks side. Bell played in all six matches on the tour, including in the three matches against New South Wales representative sides. (Note: These three matches have since been awarded Test status by the Australian Rugby Union but remain recognised only as representative matches by the New Zealand Rugby Union.) He played in two other matches for the All Blacks when the team returned to New Zealand which are considered part of the tour.

Bell worked as a clerk. He died in 1960 aged 67. He was fishing on the Taieri River when he drowned. His body was recovered after three days.
