= Don McIntosh =

New Zealand rugby union player (1931–2025)

- McIntosh at an All Blacks reunion 2006
- Born: Donald Neil McIntosh; 1 April 1931 Lower Hutt, New Zealand
- Died: 17 July 2025 (aged 94) Levin, New Zealand
- Height: 1.88 m (6 ft 2 in)
- Weight: 94 kg (207 lb)
- School: Featherston District High School
- Occupation: Farmer

Rugby union career
- Position: Flanker
Provincial / State sides
Years	Team	Apps	(Points)
1951–1960	Wellington	120	
International career
Years	Team	Apps	(Points)
1956–1957	New Zealand	4	(0)

Donald Neil McIntosh (1 April 1931 – 17 July 2025) was a New Zealand rugby union player. A flanker, McIntosh represented Wellington at a provincial level, and was a member of the New Zealand national side, the All Blacks, in 1956 and 1957. He played 13 matches for the All Blacks including four internationals.

McIntosh was the first player to represent Wellington a hundred times, with a final tally of 120 appearances. He captained his province from 1955 to 1959, including in international matches against the touring Springboks in 1956 and the 1959 British Lions. He played in Wellington's successful Ranfurly Shield challenge against Waikato in 1953, and captained another successful challenge in 1956 against Canterbury.

McIntosh died at the Levin Home for War Veterans on 17 July 2025, at the age of 94.
