= Jack McNab (rugby union, born 1895) =

New Zealand rugby union player

- Born: John Alexander McNab; 14 December 1895 Hastings, New Zealand
- Died: 23 July 1979 (aged 83) Hastings, New Zealand
- Height: 1.85 m (6 ft 1 in)
- Weight: 85 kg (187 lb)
- School: Hastings Boys' High School
- Occupation: Farmer

Rugby union career
- Position: Flanker
Provincial / State sides
Years	Team	Apps	(Points)
1920–1925	Hawke's Bay	43	
International career
Years	Team	Apps	(Points)
1925	New Zealand	0	(0)

John Alexander McNab (14 December 1895 – 23 July 1979) was a New Zealand rugby union player. A flanker, McNab represented Hawke's Bay at a provincial level, and was a member of the New Zealand national side, the All Blacks, in 1925. Considered unlucky to have missed selection for the 1924–1925 tour of Britain, Ireland and France, he was named in the team for the 1925 tour of New South Wales, but only appeared in one match against New South Wales before contracting appendicitis.
