= Herb Smith (rugby) =

New Zealand international rugby union footballer

- Full name: Charles Herbert Smith
- Born: 13 February 1909 Dunedin, New Zealand
- Died: 10 April 1976 (aged 67) Dunedin, New Zealand

Rugby union career
- Position: Centre
Senior career
Years	Team	Apps	(Points)
- Southern RFC
International career
Years	Team	Apps	(Points)
1931–36	Otago	28	
1933–34	South Island		
1934	New Zealand	0	

Charles Herbert Smith (13 February 1909 – 10 April 1976) was a New Zealand rugby union player who played as a centre in the 1930s. He played at representative level for New Zealand (non-test matches), South Island and Otago (captain), and at club level for Southern RFC.

== Playing career ==
Smith represented New Zealand on the 1934 tour of Australia, playing in the 16–13 victory over New South Wales at Sydney on Monday 6 August 1934, and scoring a try in the 35–3 victory over Newcastle at Newcastle, New South Wales on Wednesday 22 August 1934.

Smith played for South Island in the match against North Island in the 1933 season, and as a replacement against North Island in 1934 season.

Smith played for Otago in the defeats by Canterbury in the 1931 and 1933, and was captain in the 15–6 victory over Canterbury in 1935, and the three defences in 1936.

He died in April 1976.
