= William Smith (rugby union) =

- Born: William Ernest Smith; 9 March 1881 Wellington, New Zealand
- Died: 25 May 1945 (aged 64) Wellington, New Zealand
- Height: 1.88 m (6 ft 2 in)
- Weight: 90 kg (200 lb)
- School: Nelson College
- Occupation: Accountant

Rugby union career
- Position: First five-eighth
Provincial / State sides
Years	Team	Apps	(Points)
1900–08	Nelson		
International career
Years	Team	Apps	(Points)
1905	New Zealand	1	(0)

William Ernest Smith (9 March 1881 – 25 May 1945) was a New Zealand rugby union player. He was educated at Nelson College where he was a member of the 1st XV in 1897. A first five-eighth, Smith represented Nelson at a provincial level, and played only one match for the national side, the All Blacks, in 1905, an international against Australia in Dunedin.

Smith served in the Canterbury Infantry Battalion in World War I and was wounded at Gallipoli. He died in Wellington in 1945 and was buried in the soldiers' section of Karori Cemetery.
