= Sandy Kerr =

- Full name: Alexander Kerr
- Born: 3 May 1871 East Taieri, New Zealand
- Died: 18 June 1936 (aged 65) Christchurch, New Zealand
- Height: 183 cm (6 ft 0 in)
- Weight: 90 kg (198 lb)

Rugby union career
- Position: Loose forward
Provincial / State sides
| Years | Team | Apps | (Points) |
| 1895–97 | Canterbury | | |
International career
| Years | Team | Apps | (Points) |
| 1896 | New Zealand | | |

Alexander "Sandy" Kerr (3 May 1871 – 18 June 1936) was a New Zealand international rugby union player.

Kerr was born in East Taieri and educated at Green Island School, which he left as an 11 year old.

A powerful loose forward, Kerr started out at Kaikorai in Dunedin and after moving to Christchurch club Linwood played provincial rugby with Canterbury. He shares with Sydney Orchard the distinction of being the first All Black to be selected from Linwood, making his international debut against Queensland at Wellington in 1896. After contributing a try to help his side to victory, Kerr retained his place for the 1897 tour of Australia, but was forced to withdraw.

Kerr was a leather tanner and later coal merchant by profession.

== See also ==
- List of New Zealand national rugby union players
