= Bob Bennet =

- Born: Robert Bennet; 23 July 1879 Caversham, Dunedin, New Zealand
- Died: 9 April 1962 (aged 82) Dunedin, New Zealand
- School: Albany Street School (Dunedin)
- Occupation: Tailor

Rugby union career
- Position: Centre Three-quarter
Amateur team(s)
Years	Team	Apps	(Points)
1899–1906, 08–09, 11	Alhambra		
Provincial / State sides
Years	Team	Apps	(Points)
1899–1906, 08–09, 11	Otago	36	
International career
Years	Team	Apps	(Points)
1905	New Zealand	1	(0)

Robert Bennet (23 July 1879 – 9 April 1962) was a New Zealand rugby union player who represented the All Blacks in 1905. His position of choice was centre three-quarter.

Bennet was born in Caversham (now a suburb of Dunedin) in 1879. He was educated at Albany Street School in Dunedin.

== Career ==
Bennet played for the Alhambra club and appeared for the Otago province 36 times in his career.

He played just once for the New Zealand national side in the test match against Australia in 1905. His selection was aided by the fact that the Original All Blacks had left the country and were unavailable. This match was won 14–3. Bennet did not score any points.

He continued playing club and provincial rugby until 1911.

== Personal and death ==
Bennet was a tailor and had a wife named Elizabeth. He died in Dunedin in 1962 and was buried at Andersons Bay Cemetery.
