= Jack Tuck =

New Zealand rugby union player

- Born: Jack Manson Tuck; 13 May 1907 Tikokino, New Zealand
- Died: 23 March 1967 (aged 59) Whangaroa, New Zealand
- Height: 1.68 m (5 ft 6 in)
- Weight: 66 kg (146 lb)
- School: Hamilton High School

Rugby union career
- Position: Utility back
Provincial / State sides
Years	Team	Apps	(Points)
1927–29, 1930	Waikato	14	
1929	Wellington	1	
International career
Years	Team	Apps	(Points)
1929	New Zealand	3	(0)

Jack Manson Tuck (13 May 1907 – 23 March 1967) was a New Zealand rugby union player. A utility back, Tuck represented Waikato and briefly Wellington at a provincial level, and was a member of the New Zealand national side, the All Blacks, on their 1929 tour of Australia. On that tour, he played six matches for the All Blacks including all three internationals.
