= Hornby High School =

- Te Huruhuru ao o Horomaka (Māori)

Location
- 180 Waterloo Road; Hornby; Christchurch 8042; New Zealand; 43.538°S 172.527°E

Information
- Type: State co-ed secondary (Year 7–13)
- Motto: Commitment. Achievement. Resilience. Respect
- Established: 1975
- Ministry of Education Institution no.: 338
- Chairperson: Kaye Banks
- Principal: Iain Murray
- Enrolment: 1,022 (July 2026)
- Colours: Gold and Blue
- Socio-economic decile: 3H
- Website: www.hornby.school.nz

Hornby High School is a state coeducational secondary school located in the western Christchurch, New Zealand suburb of Hornby. It caters for approximately 1,022 students from Years 7 to 13 (ages 10 to 18).

== History ==
The school opened in February 1975 to serve the growing Hornby area. The permanent classroom blocks were supposed to be ready for the first intake of 240 Form 3 (now Year 9) students, but delays within the Treasury and Ministry of Works saw the completion date pushed back to early 1976. As a temporary solution, the Canterbury Education Board constructed twelve CEBUS relocatable classroom blocks (Note: CEBUS stands for Canterbury Education Board Unit System) at the eastern end of the school site. Most of the CEBUS classrooms are still present at the school, alongside the permanent S68 classroom blocks typical of 1970s-built New Zealand state secondary schools.

Originally a Year 9 to 13 secondary school, the school added Years 7 and 8 in January 2014 following the closure of nearby Branston Intermediate School.

== Enrolment ==
As of July 2026, Hornby High School has roll of 1,022 students, of which 227 (22.2%) identify as Māori.

As of 2026, the school has an Equity Index of 489, placing it amongst schools whose students have above average socioeconomic barriers to achievement (roughly equivalent to deciles 2 and 3 under the former socio-economic decile system).

== Notable staff ==
- John Minto, political activist
- Chelsea Bremner, rugby union player
