= Harold Pollock =

- Born: Harold Raymond Pollock; 7 September 1909 Petone, New Zealand
- Died: 10 January 1984 (aged 74) Ōtaki, New Zealand
- Height: 1.78 m (5 ft 10 in)
- Weight: 60 kg (130 lb)
- Occupation: Plumber

Rugby union career
- Position: Utility back
Provincial / State sides
Years	Team	Apps	(Points)
1929–39	Wellington	49	
International career
Years	Team	Apps	(Points)
1932–36	New Zealand	5	(29)

Harold Raymond Pollock (7 September 1909 – 10 January 1984) was a New Zealand rugby union player. He was a utility back, although his preferred position was at fullback. Pollock represented Wellington at a provincial level, and was a member of the New Zealand national side, the All Blacks, in 1932 and 1936. He played eight matches for the All Blacks including five internationals, scoring 41 points in all.

He was selected by the editors of the 1937 Rugby Almanac of New Zealand as one of their 5 players of the year.
