= Norman Wilson (rugby union) =

New Zealand rugby union player

Norm Wilson
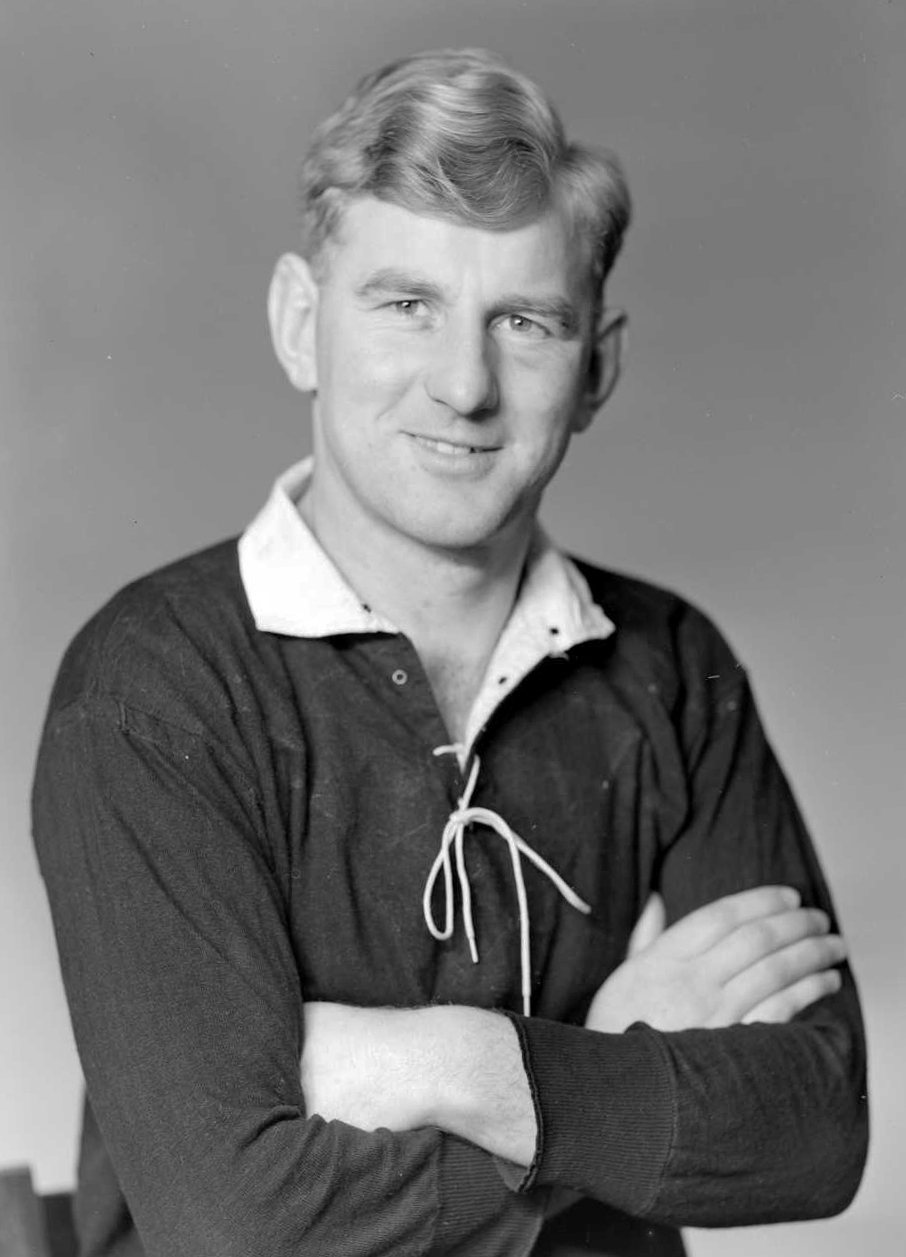
- Wilson in 1948
- Born: Norman Leslie Wilson; 13 December 1922 Masterton, New Zealand
- Died: 10 October 2001 (aged 78) Lower Hutt, New Zealand
- Height: 1.80 m (5 ft 11 in)
- Weight: 85 kg (187 lb)
- School: Wairarapa College
- University: University of Otago

Rugby union career
- Position: Hooker
Provincial / State sides
Years	Team	Apps	(Points)
1948–53	Otago		
International career
Years	Team	Apps	(Points)
1949–51	New Zealand	3	(3)

Norman Leslie Wilson (13 December 1922 – 10 October 2001) was a New Zealand rugby union player. A hooker, Wilson represented Otago at a provincial level, and was a member of the New Zealand national side, the All Blacks, from 1949 to 1951. He played 20 matches for the All Blacks including three internationals. Between 1975 and 1987 he was a comments man for rugby on TV One.

Wilson studied at the University of Otago, graduating with a Bachelor of Arts in 1953.
