= John Dick (rugby union) =

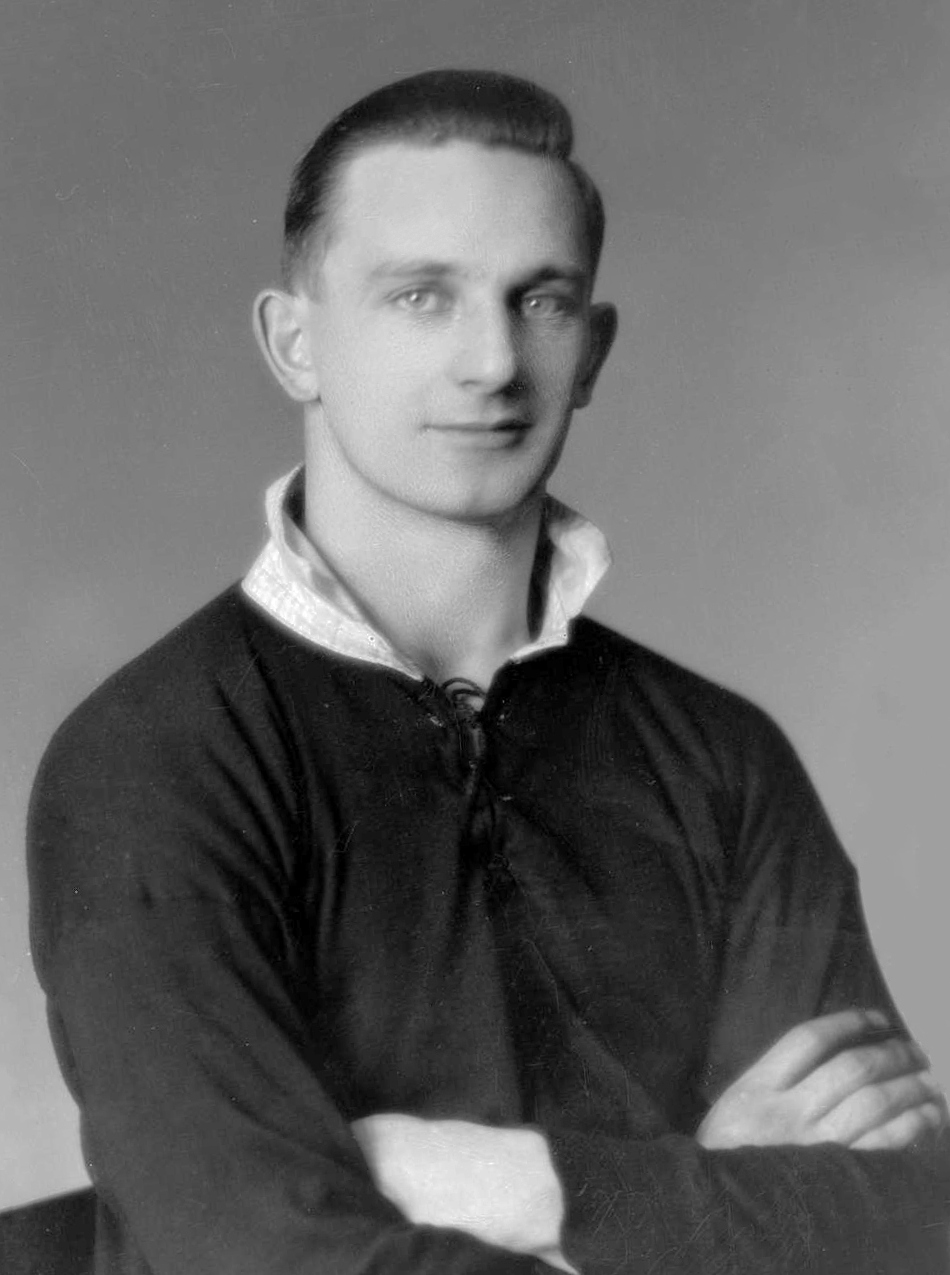
- Born: 3 October 1912 Auckland, New Zealand
- Died: 29 March 2002 (aged 89) Auckland, New Zealand
- Height: 1.78 m (5 ft 10 in)
- Weight: 79 kg (174 lb)
- School: Auckland Grammar School
- Notable relative: Malcolm Dick (son)
- Occupation: Warehouseman

Rugby union career
- Position: Wing
Provincial / State sides
Years	Team	Apps	(Points)
1935–39	Auckland		
1943	Canterbury		
International career
Years	Team	Apps	(Points)
1937–38	New Zealand	3	(3)

John Dick (3 October 1912 – 29 March 2002) was a New Zealand rugby union player. A wing three-quarter, Dick represented Auckland and, briefly, Canterbury, at a provincial level, and was a member of the New Zealand national side, the All Blacks, in 1937 and 1938. He played five matches for the All Blacks including three internationals.

During World War II, Dick served with the Royal New Zealand Air Force (RNZAF), and played in forces matches representing the RNZAF in 1943.
