= Bert Palmer =

- Born: Bertram Pitt Palmer; 14 November 1901 Mosstown, Wanganui, New Zealand
- Died: 4 September 1932 (aged 30) Auckland, New Zealand
- Height: 1.73 m (5 ft 8 in)
- Weight: 83 kg (183 lb)

Rugby union career
- Position(s): Hooker, prop
Provincial / State sides
Years	Team	Apps	(Points)
1924–1932	Auckland	63	
International career
Years	Team	Apps	(Points)
1928–1932	New Zealand	3	(3)

Bertram Pitt Palmer (14 November 1901 – 4 September 1932) was a New Zealand rugby union player. A hooker and prop, Palmer represented Auckland at a provincial level, and was a member of the New Zealand national side, the All Blacks, from 1928 to 1932. He played 18 matches for the All Blacks including three internationals. He died on 4 September 1932, a day after suffering a broken neck in an Auckland club rugby match.
