= Hugh McLaren (rugby union) =

New Zealand rugby union player

Hugh Campbell McLaren (8 June 1926 – 9 May 1992) was a New Zealand rugby union international player, who played in one test match in 1952.
