= Alexander Pringle (rugby union) =

- Born: 9 November 1899 Wellington, New Zealand
- Died: 21 February 1973 (aged 73) Christchurch, New Zealand
- Height: 1.96 m (6 ft 5 in)
- Occupation: Public servant

Rugby union career
- Position(s): Loose forward, lock
Provincial / State sides
Years	Team	Apps	(Points)
1922–27	Wellington	26	
International career
Years	Team	Apps	(Points)
1923	New Zealand	0	(0)

Alexander Pringle (9 November 1899 – 21 February 1973) was a New Zealand rugby union player. A loose forward or lock, Pringle represented Wellington at a provincial level. He played just one match for the New Zealand national side, the All Blacks, against the touring New South Wales team in 1923.

Pringle died in Christchurch on 21 February 1973, and was buried at the Ruru Lawn Cemetery.
