= Harry Frazer (rugby union) =

New Zealand rugby union player

- Born: Harry Frederick Frazer; 21 April 1916 Whanganui, New Zealand
- Died: 8 April 2003 (aged 86) Napier, New Zealand
- Height: 1.85 m (6 ft 1 in)
- Weight: 95 kg (209 lb)
- School: Napier Boys' High School
- Occupation: Carpenter

Rugby union career
- Position(s): Lock, prop
Provincial / State sides
Years	Team	Apps	(Points)
1937–41, 1946–50	Hawke's Bay		
1943	Auckland		
1944	Waikato		
International career
Years	Team	Apps	(Points)
1943	RNZAF		
1944	NZ Combined Services		
1946–1949	New Zealand	5	(0)

Harry Frederick Frazer (21 April 1916 – 8 April 2003) was a New Zealand rugby union player. A lock and prop, Frazer represented Hawke's Bay, and briefly Auckland and Waikato during World War II, at a provincial level, and was a member of the New Zealand national side, the All Blacks, from 1946 to 1949. He played 15 matches for the All Blacks including five internationals.
