= 1925 New Zealand rugby union tour of New South Wales =

- Top try scorer: George Wise (5)
- Top test point scorer(s): George Wise; David Dickson (15 each)
Summary
P	W	D	L
Total
6	5	0	1
Test match
0	0	0	0
Opponent
P	W	D	L
(New South Wales) NS Wales (Note: The three matches played by New South Wales were retroactively accorded Test status by the Australian Rugby Union in 1986, but remain as tour matches only for the NZRU.)
3	3	0	0

Tour chronology
- ← 1924–25 Europe & N.America 1926 NS Wales →

The 1925 New Zealand tour rugby to New South Wales was the 12th tour by the New Zealand national team to Australia.

During the First World War the activity of Rugby Union was suspended. In Australia, the sport was initially reprised only in New South Wales (many players switched to Rugby league especially in Queensland), so official test matches between the two national sides were not resumed until 1929.

The three most important matches were played against the New South Wales Waratahs, and New Zealand won the 3 match series 3–0. In 1986 the Australian Rugby Union accorded Test status to the New South Wales matches played against international teams in the 1920–1928 period, but the matches against the All Blacks are not recorded as Tests by the New Zealand Rugby Union.

== Tour matches ==
Complete list of matches played by the All Blacks in New South Wales:

Test matches

#	Date	Rival	City	Venue	Score
1	3 Jun	Wellington RU	Wellington		6–10
2	13 Jun	(New South Wales) NSW Waratahs	Sydney	Royal Agricultural Showground	26–3
3	17 Jun	NSW 2nd	Sydney	University Oval	16–18
4	20 Jun	(New South Wales) NSW Waratahs	Sydney	Royal Agricultural Showground	4–0
5	23 Jun	(New South Wales) NSW Waratahs	Sydney	Royal Agricultural Showground	11–3
6	27 Jun	All NSW	Newcastle	N° 1 Sports Ground	20–13
7	1 Jul	E.J. Thorn's	Sydney	Manly Oval	24–9
8	8 Jul	Wellington / Manawatu / Horowhenua	Wellington		25–11

Notes

Balance
Pl	W	D	L	Ps	Pc
8	6	0	2	187	109

== Bibliography ==
All found on link

- The Brisbane Courier, Monday 15 June 1925 p 14
- The Advertiser (Adelaide) Thursday 18 June 1925 p 12
- The Sydney Morning Herald Monday 22 June 1925 p 8
- The Barrier Miner (Broken Hill, NSW) Wednesday 24 June 1925 p 3
- The Brisbane Courier Monday 29 June 1925 p 14
- The Sydney Morning Herald Thursday 2 July 1925 p 5
