= 1938 New Zealand rugby union tour of Australia =

Summary
P	W	D	L
Total
9	9	0	0
Test match
3	3	0	0
Opponent
P	W	D	L
Australia
3	3	0	0

The 1938 New Zealand tour rugby to Australia was the 16th tour by the New Zealand national rugby union team to Australia.

It followed a 1934 tour of Australia by the All Blacks, and the 1936 Australia rugby union tour of New Zealand. New Zealand won all three test matches and retained the Bledisloe Cup.

== The tour ==
Scores and results list New Zealand's points tally first.

Opposing Team	For	Against	Date	Venue	Status
New South Wales	28	8	16 July 1938	Cricket Ground, Sydney	Tour match
Combined W.Districts	31	0	20 July 1938	Bell Road Ground, Wellington	Tour match
Australia	24	9	23 July 1938	Cricket Ground, Sydney	Test match
Newcastle	39	16	27 July 1938	Sportsground, Newcastle	Tour match
Queensland	30	9	30 July 1938	Ekka Ground, Brisbane	Tour match
Darling Downs	36	6	3 August 1938	Stadium, Toowoomba	Tour match
Australia	20	14	6 August 1938	Ekka Ground, Brisbane	Test match
A.C.T.	57	5	10 August 1938	Manuka Oval, Canberra	Tour match
Australia	14	6	13 August 1938	Cricket Ground, Sydney	Test match
