= Ranfurly Shield 1960–1969 =

New Zealand rugby union trophy

Ranfurly Shield
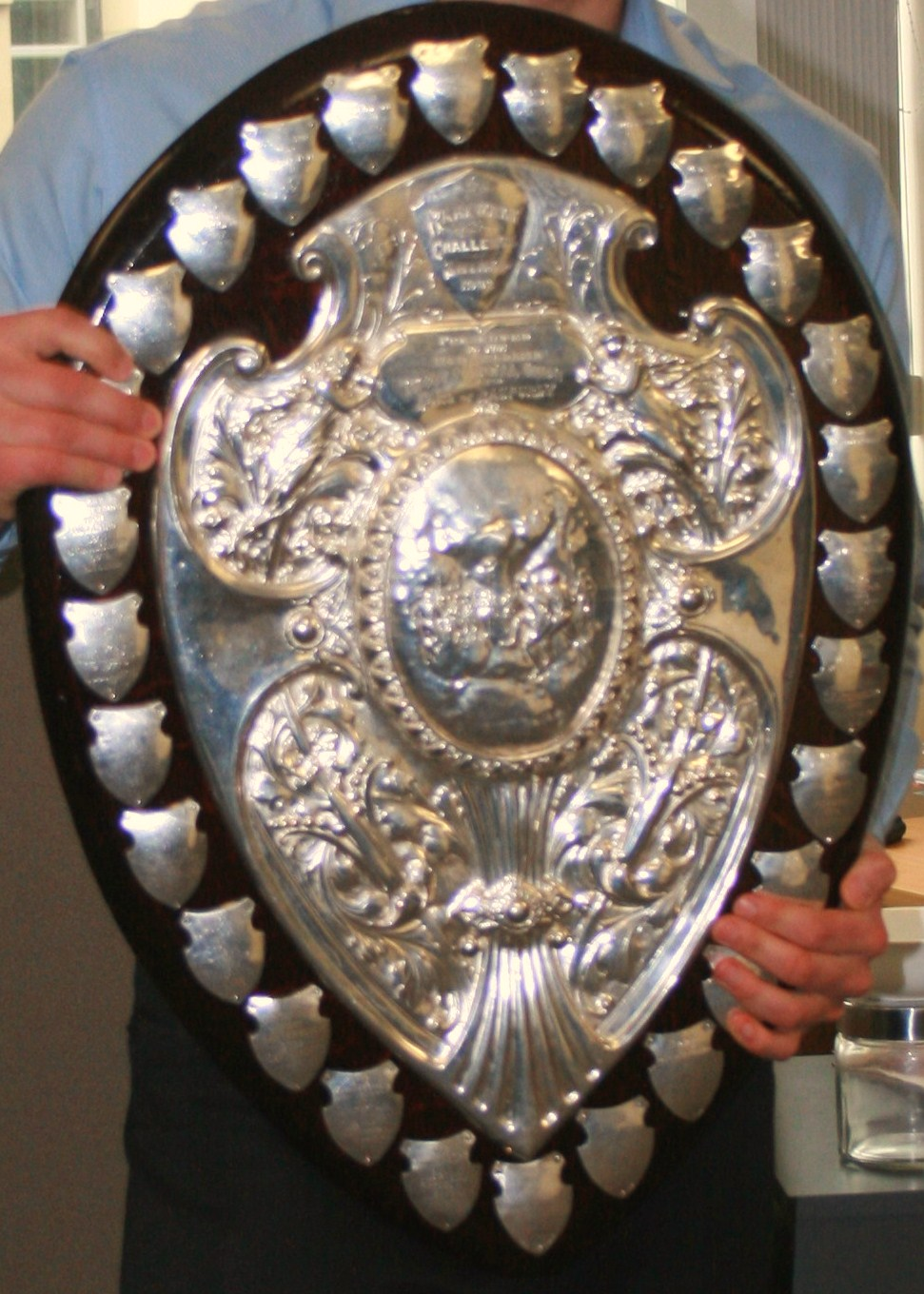
- Countries: New Zealand

Official website
- www.provincial.rugby/ranfurly-shield/

The Ranfurly Shield, colloquially known as the Log o' Wood, is a trophy in New Zealand's domestic rugby union competition. First played for in 1904, the Ranfurly Shield is based on a challenge system, rather than a league or knockout competition as with most football trophies. The holding union must defend the Shield in challenge matches, and if a challenger defeats them, they become the new holder of the Shield.

Auckland began the decade as shield holders, and held it two other times throughout the 1960s. Six other provinces held the shield during the decade ending with Canterbury at the end of the decade.

== Fixtures ==
=== 1960 ===
13 August 1960	Auckland	22–6	Thames Valley	Eden Park, Auckland
	Try: Warren Moran (3); Lyn Russell; Waka Nathan; Con: Mike Cormack (2/5); Pen: Mike Cormack (1)		Pen: M. R. Jacomb (2)

17 August 1960	Auckland	14–3	Counties	Eden Park, Auckland
	Try: C. Currie; Paul Little; Lew Fell; Con: Mike Cormack (1/3); Pen: Mike Cormack (1/1)		Pen: E. Hopa (1/1)

20 August 1960	Auckland	11–17	North Auckland	Eden Park, Auckland
	Try: Warren Moran; Con: Mike Cormack (1/1); Pen: Mike Cormack (1/1); Drop: Mack Herewini (1/1)		Try: Ned Erceg; A. J. Bennett; Con: Muru Walters (1/2); Pen: Muru Walters (3/3); Cards: Maurice Marinkovich (yellow card) 31'	Attendance: 30,000; Referee: R. H. Phizacklea (Canterbury)

27 August 1960	North Auckland	24–3	Poverty Bay	Rugby Park, Whangārei
	Try: Ned Erceg (2); A. J. Bennett; Con: Muru Walters (3/3); Pen: Muru Walters (3/4)		Pen: I. J. Hata (1/2)	Attendance: 6,000; Referee: James Logan (Wellington)

31 August 1960	North Auckland	3–6	Auckland	Rugby Park, Whangārei
	Try: H. Phillips 4'; Con: Muru Walters (0/1); Pen: Muru Walters (0/4); Drop: Muru Walters (0/1)		Try: Don McKay 58'; John Sibun 77'; Pen: John Sibun (0/1)	Attendance: 17,000; Referee: Allan Fleury (Otago)

10 September 1960	Auckland	31–8	Manawatu	Eden Park, Auckland
	Try: Don McKay (2); Warren Moran; Hallard White (2); Con: Mike Cormack (2/5); Pen: Mike Cormack (4)		Try: Jimmy Nicholls; Con: J. E. Hibberd (1/1); Pen: J. E. Hibberd (1/1)	Referee: Robert Hines (Thames Valley)

14 September 1960	Auckland	9–6	Bay of Plenty	Eden Park, Auckland
	Try: N. Bowerman; Con: Mike Cormack (0/1); Pen: Mike Cormack (2/3)		Try: Mick Doherty; Con: Mick Doherty (0/1); Pen: Mick Doherty (1/1)	Referee: G. Henwood (Wanganui)

17 September 1960	Auckland	22–9	Wellington	Eden Park, Auckland
	Try: Paul Little; Don McKay; Con: Tony Davies (2); Pen: Mike Cormack (0/1); Tony Davies (4/5)		Try: Barry Alfred Cull; Con: Mick Williment (0/1); Pen: Mick Williment (2/4)	Attendance: 30,000

24 September 1960	Auckland	25–6	Taranaki	Eden Park, Auckland
	Try: Don McKay (2); Warren Moran; Bob Graham; Con: Mike Cormack (2/3); Pen: Mike Cormack (2/3); Drop: Mack Herewini (1/1)		Try: Kerry Hurley; Con: J. L. Bayly (0/1); Pen: W. J. Cameron (1/2)

28 September 1960	Auckland	19–18	Canterbury	Eden Park, Auckland
	Try: Kel Tremain; Waka Nathan; Con: Mike Cormack (2/2); Pen: Mike Cormack (3/6)		Try: Buddy Henderson; Con: Buddy Henderson (0/1); Pen: Buddy Henderson (5/6); Drop: Fergie McCormick (0/1)	Attendance: 20,000; Referee: Pat Murphy (North Auckland)

=== 1961 ===
12 August 1961	Auckland	5–3	Hawke's Bay	Eden Park, Auckland
	Try: Waka Nathan; Con: John Brady (1/1)		Pen: Tony Small (1/2)	Referee: Robert Hines (Thames Valley)

16 August 1961	Auckland	17–3	King Country	Eden Park, Auckland
	Try: Malcolm Dick; Mack Herewini; Lew Fell; Con: John Sibun (1/3)		Pen: Waka Coffin (1/4); Raymond Coffin (0/1)	Referee: Sonny Sciascia (Horowhenua)

19 August 1961	Auckland	17–12	Counties	Eden Park, Auckland
	Try: Bob Graham (2); John Sibun; Albie Pryor; Con: John Sibun (1/2); Pen: John Sibun (1/1); Drop: Mack Herewini (0/1)		Pen: Eddie Whatarau (2/2); Drop: Eddie Whatarau (2/2)	Referee: D. Last (Buller)

26 August 1961	Auckland	14–9	Otago	Eden Park, Auckland
	Try: Bob Graham; R. M. King; Con: John Sibun (1/1); Pen: John Sibun (1/2); Drop: John Sibun (1/1)		Try: G. Merrilees; Con: Tony Davies (0/1); Pen: Tony Davies (2/2); Drop: L. Stevenson (0/1)	Referee: F. G. M. Parkinson (Manawatu)

30 August 1961	Auckland	9–6	Southland	Eden Park, Auckland
	Try: Bob Graham; Con: John Sibun (0/1); Pen: John Sibun (1/1); Drop: John Sibun (1/1)		Pen: Barrie Cullen (2/2)	Referee: V. Langford (Canterbury)

9 September 1961	Auckland	13–8	Wellington	Eden Park, Auckland
	Try: Albie Pryor; Hallard White; Con: Mike Cormack (2/2); Pen: Mike Cormack (1/1)		Try: Nev MacEwan; Con: Mick Williment (1/1); Pen: Mick Williment (1/1)	Referee: Allan Fleury (Otago)

16 September 1961	Auckland	10–0	Waikato	Eden Park, Auckland
	Try: Paul Little (2); Con: Mike Cormack (2/2)		Pen: Don Clarke (0/3); Drop: Don Clarke (0/1)	Attendance: 47,000; Referee: Chis Robson (Wellington)

30 September 1961	Auckland	26–11	North Auckland	Eden Park, Auckland
	Try: Lew Fell; Waka Nathan (2); Wilson Whineray; Con: Mike Cormack (4/4); Pen: Mike Cormack (2/5)		Try: A. J. Bennett; Eddie Dean; Con: Muru Walters (1/1); Pen: Muru Walters (1/1)	Attendance: 42,000; Referee: Cliff McAuley (Otago)

=== 1962 ===
7 August 1962	Auckland	24–9	Thames Valley	Eden Park, Auckland
	Try: Lew Fell; Wilson Whineray; Rocky Patterson; Malcolm Dick; Frank Colthurst; Con: Mike Cormack (1/2); B. Williams (2/3); Pen: Mike Cormack (1/6)		Pen: Terry Shaw (3/3)	Referee: Sonny Sciascia (Horowhenua)

11 August 1962	Auckland	29–6	Bay of Plenty	Eden Park, Auckland
	Try: Albie Pryor (2); Malcolm Dick (2); Waka Nathan; Con: Mike Cormack (4/5); Pen: Mike Cormack (2/2)		Try: Ian MacRae; Con: Mick Doherty (0/1); Pen: Mick Doherty (0/3); Rod Oswald (1/1)	Referee: Chis Robson (Wellington)

18 August 1962	Auckland	8–3	North Auckland	Eden Park, Auckland
	Try: Mack Herewini; Con: Mike Cormack (1/1); Pen: Mack Herewini (1/1)		Try: Eddie Dean; Con: Victor Yates (0/1)	Attendance: 27,000

25 August 1962	Auckland	52–6	West Coast	Eden Park, Auckland
	Try: Albie Pryor (3); Rocky Patterson (2); Malcolm Dick (2); Ron Rangi; A. A. T. Edgar; Lew Fell; Hallard White; Frank Colthurst; Con: Mike Cormack (8/12); Pen: Mike Cormack (0/1)		Pen: John Michael Eathorne (1/1); Drop: Neil McAra (1/1)	Referee: Pat Murphy (North Auckland)

1 September 1962	Auckland	15–11	Waikato	Eden Park, Auckland
	Try: Mack Herewini; Con: Mike Cormack (0/1); Pen: Mike Cormack (2/2); Drop: Mack Herewini (2/2)		Try: Brian Clarke; Con: Don Clarke (1/1); Pen: Don Clarke (2/2)	Attendance: 48,000; Referee: F. G. Parkinson (Manawatu)

4 September 1962	Auckland	27–3	Taranaki	Eden Park, Auckland
	Try: Mack Herewini; Lew Fell (2); Wilson Whineray; Hallard White; Con: Mike Cormack (3/5); Pen: Mike Cormack (1/1); Drop: Mack Herewini (1/1)		Pen: Bobby O'Dowda (1/1)	Attendance: 18,000; Referee: Jack Forsyth (Waikato)

15 September 1962	Auckland	15–6	Canterbury	Eden Park, Auckland
	Try: Mack Herewini; Paul Little; Con: Mike Cormack (0/2); Pen: Mike Cormack (3/8); Drop: Mack Herewini (0/3); Bob Graham (0/1)		Pen: Fergie McCormick (2/2); Drop: Fergie McCormick (0/1); Bruce Watt (0/2); Ray Moreton (0/1); Mike Allen (0/1)	Attendance: 40,000; Referee: Chis Robson (Waikato)

25 September 1962	Auckland	46–6	Bush	Eden Park, Auckland
	Try: Albie Pryor (2); Adrian Clarke (2); Malcolm Dick; Ron Rangi; Jim Maniapoto; Lew Fell; Wilson Whineray; Con: Mike Cormack (8/9); Pen: Mike Cormack (1/1)		Try: H. E. Williams; Con: Russell Eames (0/1); Pen: Russell Eames (1/1)	Referee: Ian Wilson (Marlborough)

29 September 1962	Auckland	20–8	Wellington	Eden Park, Auckland
	Try: Don McKay; Wilson Whineray; Paul Little; Malcolm Dick; Con: Pat Walsh (1/4); Drop: Pat Walsh (1/1); Adrian Clarke (1/1)		Try: Nev MacEwan; Con: Mick Williment (1/1); Pen: Mick Williment (0/1); Drop: Mick Williment (1/1)	Attendance: 42,000

=== 1963 ===
6 August 1963	Auckland	22–8	Wairarapa	Eden Park, Auckland
	Try: Rocky Patterson; Don McKay; Mack Herewini; Lew Fell; Con: Mike Cormack (2/4); Pen: Mike Cormack (2/2)		Try: George Rangi Mahupuku; Ian Robert Laing; Con: R. C. Blake (1/2)	Attendance: 12,000; Referee: R. Lambert (Taranaki)

24 August 1963	Auckland	41–18	Wanganui	Eden Park, Auckland
	Try: Mack Herewini; Lew Fell (2); Waka Nathan (2); Wilson Whineray; Rocky Patterson; Ron Rangi; Te Roi Tataurangi; Con: Haupai Henare (4/9); Pen: Haupai Henare (2/2)		Pen: Colin Pierce (5/5); Drop: Donald Dormer (1/1)	Referee: Owen McDowell (Canterbury)

27 August 1963	Auckland	3–3	Hawke's Bay	Eden Park, Auckland
	Try: Malcolm Dick 55'; Con: Haupai Henare (0/1)		Pen: Tony Small (1/2) 25'	Referee: Pat Murphy (North Auckland)

31 August 1963	Auckland	3–8	Wellington	Eden Park, Auckland
	Try: Don McKay; Con: Haupai Henare (0/1)		Try: Paul Antonio Russo; Con: Mick Williment (1/1); Pen: Mick Williment (1/1)	Referee: Cliff McAuley (Otago)

7 September 1963	Wellington	3–17	Taranaki	Athletic Park, Wellington
	Pen: Mick Williment (1/1)		Try: Ritchie Coles (2); Terry O'Sullivan; Kevin Briscoe; Con: Bobby O'Dowda (1/4); Pen: Bobby O'Dowda (1/1)	Referee: Chis Robson (Waikato)

14 September 1963	Taranaki	14–12	Wanganui	Rugby Park, New Plymouth
	Try: Kerry Hurley; Ross Brown; John McCullough; Con: Bobby O'Dowda (1/3); Pen: Bobby O'Dowda (1/1); Drop: Ross Brown (0/1)		Pen: Colin Pierce (4/4)	Attendance: 20,000; Referee: John Pring (Auckland)

=== 1964 ===
22 July 1964	Taranaki	11–0	Buller	Rugby Park, New Plymouth
	Try: Eric Keith; Gary Hayes; Con: Murray Wills (1/2); Drop: Ross Brown (1/1)			Attendance: 8,000; Referee: Allan Gilbert Burns (North Auckland)

1 August 1964	Taranaki	15–15	Wanganui	Rugby Park, New Plymouth
	Try: Gary Hayes; John Major; Con: Bobby O'Dowda (0/2); Drop: Ross Brown (3/3)		Try: Colin Pierce; Con: Colin Pierce (0/1); Pen: Colin Pierce (4/4)	Attendance: 21,000; Referee: Colin J. Wilson (Mid Canterbury)

8 August 1964	Taranaki	3–0	Wellington	Rugby Park, New Plymouth
	Drop: Neil Paterson (1/1) 62'			Attendance: 28,000

15 August 1964	Taranaki	21–0	King Country	Rugby Park, New Plymouth
	Try: Neil Wolfe (3); Lloyd Clarke; Frederick Harris; Con: Bobby O'Dowda (0/5); Pen: Bobby O'Dowda (1/1); Drop: Ross Brown (1/1)

22 August 1964	Taranaki	12–9	Canterbury	Rugby Park, New Plymouth
	Pen: Bobby O'Dowda (1/1); Kevin Briscoe (2/3); Drop: Ross Brown (1/1)		Pen: Fergie McCormick (3/3)	Referee: John Pring (Auckland)

29 August 1964	Taranaki	32–8	Wairarapa	Rugby Park, New Plymouth
	Try: Ross Brown; Neil Wolfe; Terry O'Sullivan; Eric Keith; Murray Wills; Con: Kevin Briscoe (4/5); Pen: Kevin Briscoe (1/1); Drop: Ross Brown (1/1); Kerry Hurley (1/1)		Try: Brian Lochore; Con: Toby Hawea (1/1); Pen: Toby Hawea (1/1)

1 September 1964	Taranaki	6–3	Manawatu	Rugby Park, New Plymouth
	Pen: Kevin Briscoe (2/2); Drop: Bobby O'Dowda (0/1); Ross Brown (0/3)		Drop: Jimmy Taitoko (1/1)	Attendance: 12,000

12 September 1964	Taranaki	14–9	Waikato	Rugby Park, New Plymouth
	Try: Kerry Hurley; Con: Kevin Briscoe (1/1); Pen: Kevin Briscoe (3/3)		Try: J. A. S. McKenzie; Con: David Flavell (0/1); Pen: David Flavell (2/2)	Attendance: 21,000

26 September 1964	Taranaki	12–8	North Auckland	Rugby Park, New Plymouth
	Drop: Ross Brown (3/3); Terry O'Sullivan (1/1)		Try: Victor Yates; Con: Ted Thompson (1/1); Pen: Ted Thompson (1/1)	Referee: Leonard Stanley Kirk (Canterbury)

=== 1965 ===
28 July 1965	Taranaki	33–6	Bush	Rugby Park, New Plymouth
	Try: Murray Wills (2); Ross Brown; Ian Eliason; Ritchie Coles; Kerry Hurley; Con: Kevin Briscoe (3/6); Pen: Kevin Briscoe (3/3)		Pen: Ian McHardy (1/1); Graeme Humphrey (1/1)

7 August 1965	Taranaki	23–9	Wanganui	Rugby Park, New Plymouth
	Try: Murray Wills (2); Kevin Briscoe; Lloyd Clarke; Con: Kevin Briscoe (4/4); Pen: Kevin Briscoe (1/1)		Try: Colin Pierce; Lyndsay John Meads; Con: Colin Pierce (0/1); Lyndsay John Meads (0/1); Pen: Colin Pierce (0/3); Lyndsay John Meads (1/1)	Attendance: 20,000

14 August 1965	Taranaki	11–3	Wellington	Rugby Park, New Plymouth
	Try: Neil Wolfe; John McCullough; Con: Kevin Briscoe (1/2); Drop: Ross Brown (1/1)		Pen: Mick Williment (1/1)	Attendance: 30,000; Referee: Alan Ralph Taylor (Canterbury)

28 August 1965	Taranaki	6–6	Southland	Rugby Park, New Plymouth
	Try: Lloyd Clarke; Con: Kerry Hurley (0/1); Pen: Kevin Briscoe (0/2); Drop: Ross Brown (1/3)		Try: Graham Alan Townsend; Pen: Barrie John Cullen	Attendance: 18,000

4 September 1965	Taranaki	21–17	Hawke's Bay	Rugby Park, New Plymouth
	Try: Kerry Hurley (2); Ross Brown; Roger Urbahn; Pen: Kerry Hurley (3/3)		Try: Flores Duvenage (2); Ian MacRae; Con: Tony Small (1/2); Pen: Tony Small (1/1); Drop: Max Loughlin (1/1)	Attendance: 22,000

11 September 1965	Taranaki	11–16	Auckland	Rugby Park, New Plymouth
	Try: Ross Brown; Con: Kevin Briscoe (1/1); Pen: Kevin Briscoe (2/2)		Try: Tony Davies; Bob Graham; Rocky Patterson; Con: Tony Davies (2/3); Pen: Tony Davies (1/1)

29 September 1965	Auckland	14–6	Waikato	Eden Park, Auckland
	Try: Des Connor; Lew Fell; Con: Tony Davies (1/2); Pen: Tony Davies (2/2)		Try: Ian Begbie; Con: David Flavell (0/1); Pen: David Flavell (1/1); Drop: Ray Kemp (0/2)	Attendance: 20,000; Referee: Cliff McAuley (Otago)

=== 1966 ===
16 August 1966	Auckland	14–6	King Country	Eden Park, Auckland
	Try: Rocky Patterson (2); Con: David Laurie (1/2); Pen: David Laurie (2/2)		Try: Stan Meads; Con: Rangi Paki (0/1); Pen: Rangi Paki (1/5)	Attendance: 12,000; Referee: Colin J. Wilson (Mid Canterbury)

20 August 1966	Auckland	11–11	Canterbury	Eden Park, Auckland
	Try: Rocky Patterson (2); Con: David Laurie (1/2); Pen: David Laurie (2/2)		Try: Ian Harold Penrose; Con: Fergie McCormick (1/1); Pen: Fergie McCormick (1/1); Alex Wyllie (1/2)	Attendance: 22,137; Referee: Pat Murphy (North Auckland)

27 August 1966	Auckland	11–16	Waikato	Eden Park, Auckland
	Try: Don McKay; Peter Murdoch; Con: Mike Cormack (1/2); Pen: Mike Cormack (1/1)		Try: John Laurence Cresswell (2); Con: David Flavell (2/2); Pen: David Flavell (2/2)

24 September 1966	Waikato	0–6	Hawke's Bay	Rugby Park, Hamilton
			Try: Bill Davis; Con: Ian Bishop (0/1); Pen: Ian Bishop (1/1)	Attendance: 20,000

=== 1967 ===
22 July 1967	Hawke's Bay	11–6	Manawatu	McLean Park, Napier
	Try: Dave Bone; Ian MacRae; Con: Ian Bishop (1/2); Pen: Ian Bishop (1/1)		Pen: Lindsay Meads (2/2)	Attendance: 21,500; Referee: John Pring (Auckland)

29 July 1967	Hawke's Bay	35–9	Waikato	McLean Park, Napier
	Try: Kel Tremain (2); Ian MacRae (4); Denis Smith; Con: Ian Bishop (7/7)		Pen: Brian Cooper (3/3)	Attendance: 22,500; Referee: Dave Millar (Otago)

12 August 1967	Hawke's Bay	27–6	Wairarapa	McLean Park, Napier
	Try: Neil Thimbleby; Kel Tremain (2); Dave Bone (2); Bill Davis; Con: Ian Bishop (3/6); Pen: Ian Bishop (1/1)		Pen: Dermot Payton (1/1); Drop: Ray Kemp (1/1)	Attendance: 18,800; Referee: Pat Murphy (North Auckland)

2 September 1967	Hawke's Bay	29–6	Southland	McLean Park, Napier
	Try: Kel Tremain (3); Blair Furlong; Con: Ian Bishop (4/4); Pen: Ian Bishop (3/3)		Pen: Barrie John Cullen (2/2)	Attendance: 19,600; Referee: Raymond Kenneth Marsh (Wellington)

16 September 1967	Hawke's Bay	16–3	Taranaki	McLean Park, Napier
	Try: Blair Furlong; Aidan Thomas; Con: Ian Bishop (2/2); Pen: Ian Bishop (2/2)		Pen: Kerry Hurley (1/1)	Attendance: 24,200; Referee: Chis Robson (Waikato)

23 September 1967	Hawke's Bay	9–8	Otago	McLean Park, Napier
	Try: Aidan Thomas; Con: Ian Bishop (0/1); Pen: Ian Bishop (2/2)		Try: Warren Townsend; Con: Laurie Mains (1/1); Pen: Laurie Mains (1/1)	Attendance: 19,150; Referee: Kenneth Bush (Manawatu)

30 September 1967	Hawke's Bay	12–12	Wellington	McLean Park, Napier
	Try: Mick Duncan; Con: Ian Bishop (0/1); Pen: Ian Bishop (2/2); Drop: Blair Furlong (1/1)		Pen: Mick Williment (2/8); Drop: Mattie Blackburn (2/2)	Attendance: 25,580; Referee: Dave Millar (Otago)

=== 1968 ===
29 June 1968	Hawke's Bay	36–6	Bush	McLean Park, Napier
	Try: Bill Davis (3); Karaan Crawford; Kel Tremain; Mick Duncan; Con: Ian Bishop (3/6); Pen: Ian Bishop (3/3); Drop: Blair Furlong (1/1)		Pen: Paul Goldsworthy (2/2)	Attendance: 13,781; Referee: Royden Macey (Nelson)

6 July 1968	Hawke's Bay	31–0	East Coast	McLean Park, Napier
	Try: Tom Johnson (2); Mick Duncan (2); Blair Furlong; Doug Curtis; Bill Davis; Gary Condon; Con: Ian Bishop (2/8); Pen: Ian Bishop (1/1)			Attendance: 13,292; Referee: Noel Scott (Wairarapa)

3 August 1968	Hawke's Bay	21–5	Poverty Bay	McLean Park, Napier
	Try: Karaan Crawford; Mick Duncan; Tom Johnson; Con: Ian Bishop (0/3); Pen: Ian Bishop (2/2); Drop: Blair Furlong (1/1); Ian Bishop (1/1)		Try: John Collins; Con: Murray Hollis (1/1)	Attendance: 14,249; Referee: Keith Gawn (North Otago)

24 August 1968	Hawke's Bay	30–3	Marlborough	McLean Park, Napier
	Try: Kel Tremain (2); Mick Duncan; John Doughan; Rod Abel; Con: Ian Bishop (3/5); Pen: Ian Bishop (1/1); Drop: Blair Furlong (2/2)		Drop: Kerry Hodges (1/1)	Attendance: 20,125; Referee: Laurence O'Keefe (Taranaki)

7 September 1968	Hawke's Bay	18–3	Counties	McLean Park, Napier
	Try: Blair Furlong; Gary Condon; Con: Ian Bishop (0/2); Pen: Ian Bishop (4/4)		Pen: Kenneth Macmillan (0/3); Bill Hardgrave (1/1)	Attendance: 13,241; Referee: Laurence O'Keefe (Taranaki)

21 September 1968	Hawke's Bay	14–0	Bay of Plenty	McLean Park, Napier
	Try: Mick Duncan; Hepa Paewai; Con: Ian Bishop (1/2); Pen: Ian Bishop (1/1); Drop: Blair Furlong (1/1)		Pen: Ernst van der Leeden (0/4)	Attendance: 18,695; Referee: Humphrey Rainey (Wellington)

28 September 1968	Hawke's Bay	9–9	Auckland	McLean Park, Napier
	Pen: Ian Bishop (2/2); Paul Carney (1/1)		Pen: Roger Whatman (2/2); Drop: Roger Whatman (1/1)	Attendance: 25,423; Referee: Dave Millar (Otago)

=== 1969 ===
26 July 1969	Hawke's Bay	18–11	Wairarapa	McLean Park, Napier
	Try: John Doughan; Hilton Meech; Mick Duncan; Con: Ian Bishop (0/3); Pen: Ian Bishop (2/2); Drop: John Doughan (1/1)		Try: Bill Rowlands; Con: Dermot Payton (1/1); Pen: Dermot Payton (1/1); Drop: John Tuckerman (1/1)	Attendance: 16,480; Referee: Royden Macey (Nelson)

2 August 1969	Hawke's Bay	22–6	Manawatu	McLean Park, Napier
	Try: Ian MacRae; Mick Duncan; Kel Tremain; Bill Davis; Con: Paul Carney (2/4); Pen: Paul Carney (1/1); Drop: John Doughan (1/1)		Pen: Jamie Francis (2/2)	Attendance: 17,986; Referee: Alan Ralph Taylor (Canterbury)

9 August 1969	Hawke's Bay	19–16	King Country	McLean Park, Napier
	Try: Mick Duncan; Bill Davis; Ian MacRae; Hepa Paewai; Con: Ian Bishop (2/4); Drop: John Doughan (1/1)		Try: Dave Koni; Ian Ingham; George Peake; John Wereta; Con: Maurice Rush (2/4)	Attendance: 21,252; Referee: John Pring (Auckland)

23 August 1969	Hawke's Bay	27–13	Waikato	McLean Park, Napier
	Try: Bill Davis (4); Hilton Meech; Dennis Smith; Con: Ian Bishop (3/6); Pen: Ian Bishop (1/1)		Try: Mike Hull; Penalty try Con: Noel Pickrang (2/2); Pen: Noel Pickrang (1/1)	Attendance: 17,385; Referee: Laurence O'Keefe (Taranaki)

30 August 1969	Hawke's Bay	14–6	Wellington	McLean Park, Napier
	Try: Ian MacRae; Bill Davis; Hepa Paewai; Con: Ian Bishop (1/3); Pen: Ian Bishop (1/1)		Try: Ian Stevens; Drop: Mattie Blackburn (1/1)	Attendance: 26,292; Referee: Keith Gawn (North Otago)

10 September 1969	Hawke's Bay	10–8	North Auckland	McLean Park, Napier
	Try: Ian MacRae; Kel Tremain; Con: Ian Bishop (2/2)		Try: Bevan Holmes; Con: Brian Going (1/1); Drop: Sid Going (1/1)	Attendance: 20,574; Referee: Albert George Derby (King Country)

20 September 1969	Hawke's Bay	24–8	Taranaki	McLean Park, Napier
	Try: Dennis Smith (2); Mick Duncan; John Rumball; Con: Ian Bishop (3/4); Pen: Ian Bishop (2/2)		Try: Bill Currey; Con: Barry O'Dowda (1/1); Pen: Barry O'Dowda (1/1)	Attendance: 20,177; Referee: Alan Ralph Taylor (Canterbury)

27 September 1969	Hawke's Bay	11–18	Canterbury	McLean Park, Napier
	Try: Blair Furlong (2); Con: Ian Bishop (1/2); Pen: Ian Bishop (1/1)		Try: Alex Wyllie; Gary Bacon; Con: Fergie McCormick (0/2); Pen: Fergie McCormick (4/4)	Attendance: 24,017; Referee: Pat Murphy (North Auckland)
