= 1963–64 New Zealand rugby union tour of Britain, Ireland, France and North America =

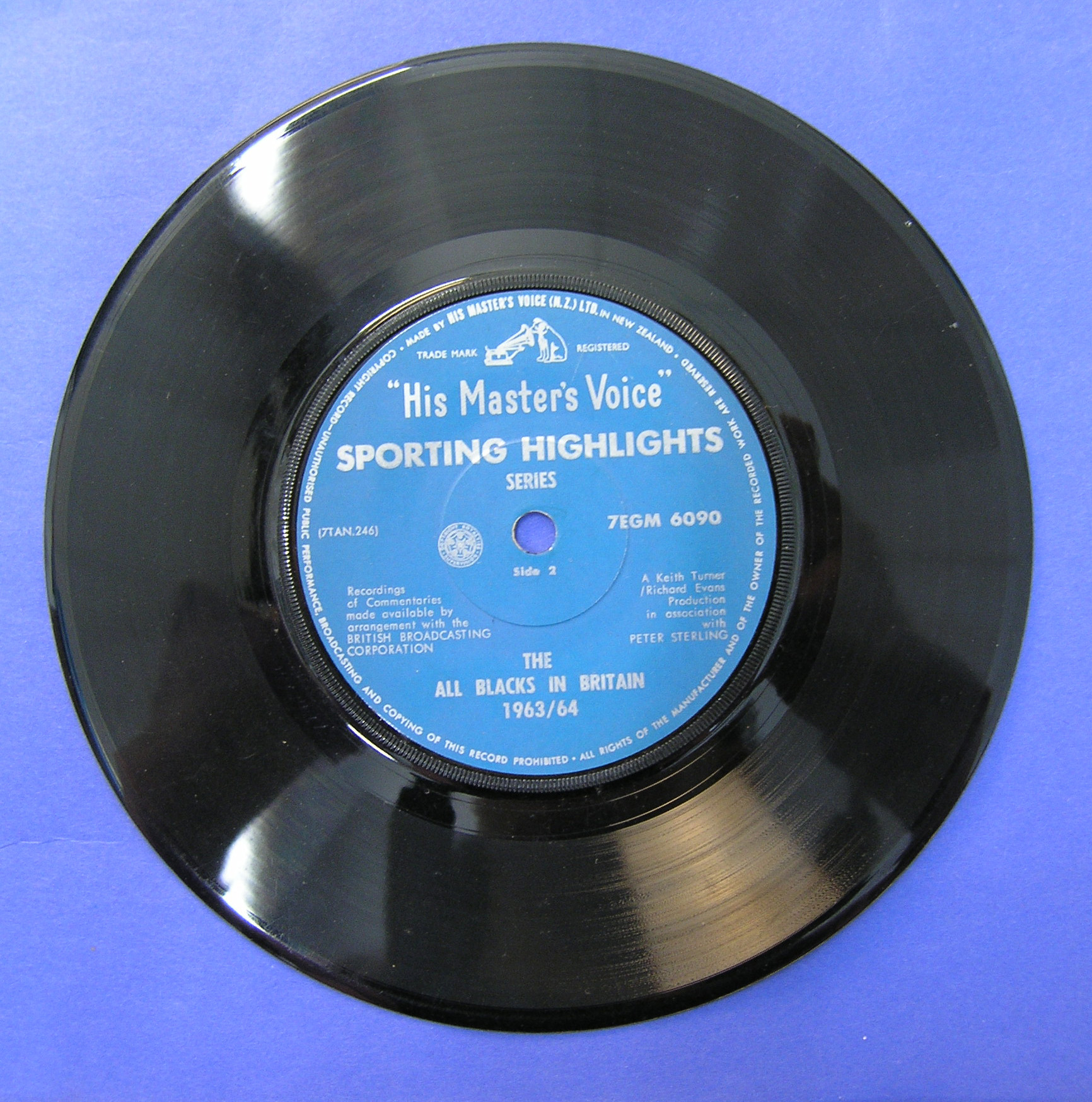
Gramophone recording of highlights of BBC commentary on the 1963–64 tour

The 1963–64 New Zealand tour of Britain, Ireland and France was a rugby union tour undertaken by the New Zealand national rugby union team. The tour took in the five major Northern Hemisphere rugby nations of England, Scotland, Ireland, Wales and France. The tour also took in matches against club opposition and invitational county teams, ending in Europe with an encounter with the Barbarians. The final two games of the tour were played in Canada.

The New Zealand team were nearly invincible on this tour, their only defeat coming at Newport. They played 36 matches in total, winning 34, losing one and drawing one. They won four of their five international matches, being prevented from completing a clean sweep by a 0–0 draw in the match against Scotland.

== Matches ==
Scores and results list New Zealand's points tally first.

	Date	Opponent	Location	Result	Score
Match 1	23 October	Oxford University	Iffley Road, Oxford	Won	19–3
Match 2	26 October	Southern Counties	Greyhound Stadium, Hove	Won	32–3
Match 3	30 October	Newport	Rodney Parade, Newport	Lost	0–3
Match 4	2 November	Neath and Aberavon	Talbot Athletic Ground, Port Talbot	Won	11–6
Match 5	6 November	Abertillery and Ebbw Vale	Abertillery Ground, Abertillery	Won	13–0
Match 6	9 November	London Counties	Twickenham, London	Won	27–0
Match 7	13 November	Cambridge University	Grange Road, Cambridge	Won	20–6
Match 8	16 November	South of Scotland	Mansfield Park, Hawick	Won	8–0
Match 9	20 November	Glasgow - Edinburgh	Little Hughenden Park, Glasgow	Won	33–3
Match 10	23 November	Cardiff	Cardiff Arms Park, Cardiff	Won	6–5
Match 11	27 November	Pontypool and Cross Keys	Pontypool Park, Pontypool	Won	11–0
Match 12	30 November	South-Western Counties	County Ground, Exeter	Won	38–6
Match 13	3 December	Midland Counties	Coundon Road, Coventry	Won	37–9
Match 14	7 December	IRELAND	Lansdowne Road, Dublin	Won	6–5
Match 15	11 December	Munster	Thomond Park, Limerick	Won	6–3
Match 16	14 December	Swansea	St. Helen's, Swansea	Won	16–9
Match 17	17 December	Western Counties	Memorial Ground, Bristol	Won	22–14
Match 18	21 December	WALES	Cardiff Arms Park, Cardiff	Won	6–0
Match 19	26 December	Combined Services	Twickenham, London	Won	23–9
Match 20	28 December	Midland Counties	Welford Road, Leicester	Won	14–6
Match 21	31 December	Llanelli	Stradey Park, Llanelli	Won	22–8
Match 22	4 January	ENGLAND	Twickenham, London	Won	14–0
Match 23	8 January	North-Western Counties	White City Ground, Manchester	Won	12–3
Match 24	11 January	North-Eastern Counties	Yorkshire Agricultural Showgrounds, Harrogate	Won	17–11
Match 25	14 January	North of Scotland	Linksfield Stadium, Aberdeen	Won	15–3
Match 26	18 January	SCOTLAND	Murrayfield, Edinburgh	Drawn	0–0
Match 27	22 January	Leinster	Lansdowne Road, Dublin	Won	11–8
Match 28	25 January	Ulster	Ravenhill, Belfast	Won	24–5
Match 29	29 January	South-Eastern Counties	King's Park, Bournemouth	Won	9–6
Match 30	1 February	France B	Stade Municipal, Toulouse	Won	17–8
Match 31	5 February	South-West France	Stade Municipal, Bordeaux	Won	23–0
Match 32	8 February	FRANCE	Stade Colombes, Paris	Won	12–3
Match 33	12 February	South-East France	Stade Municipal, Lyon	Won	8–5
Match 34	15 February	Barbarians	Cardiff Arms Park, Cardiff	Won	36–3
Match 35	22 February	British Columbia Under-25 XV	Empire Stadium, Vancouver	Won	6–3
Match 36	24 February	British Columbia	Empire Stadium, Vancouver	Won	39–3

== Touring party ==
- Manager: F. D. Kilby
- Assistant Manager: Neil McPhail
- Captain: Wilson Whineray

=== Backs ===
- Don Clarke (Waikato)
- Malcolm Dick (Auckland)
- Ian MacRae (Hawke's Bay)
- Earle Kirton (Otago)
- Ralph Caulton (Wellington)
- Bill Davis (Hawke's Bay)
- Ian Smith (Otago)
- Paul Little (Auckland)
- Derek Arnold (Canterbury)
- Pat Walsh (Counties)
- Mack Herewini (Auckland)
- Bruce Watt (Canterbury)
- Kevin Briscoe (Taranaki)
- Chris Laidlaw (Otago)

=== Forwards ===
- Wilson Whineray (Auckland)
- John Major (Taranaki)
- Jules Le Lievre (Canterbury)
- Allan Stewart (Canterbury)
- Ron Horsley (Manawatu)
- Kel Tremain (Hawke's Bay)
- Brian Lochore (Wairarapa)
- Keith Nelson (Otago)
- Colin Meads (King Country)
- Ken Gray (Wellington)
- Ian Clarke (Waikato)
- Dennis Young (Canterbury)
- Stanley Meads (King Country)
- Kevin Barry (Thames Valley)
- John Graham (Canterbury)
- Waka Nathan (Auckland)
