= Otahuhu RFC =

Coordinates: 36.948482°S 174.840461°E

(New Zealand) Otahuhu Rugby Football Club
- Union: Auckland Rugby Football Union
- Founded: 1926
- Location: Ōtāhuhu, Auckland
- Ground: Sturges Park
- President: Aiolupotea John Roache
- League: Auckland Premier

Ōtāhuhu Rugby Football Club is a rugby union club based in Auckland, New Zealand. The club was established in 1926 and is affiliated with the Auckland Rugby Football Union. The club have historically been one of the most successful in Auckland history, having won the Gallaher Shield on nine occasions, most recently in 2000. Ōtāhuhu have also produced numerous Auckland and international representatives, including 13 All Blacks.

== Honours ==
Auckland Club Championship (9) 1956*, 1959, 1960, 1961, 1963, 1965, 1969, 1982, 2000

- *Shared with University.

== All Blacks ==
- Bert Palmer
- Henry Brown
- Des Christian
- Frank McMullen
- Waka Nathan
- Mack Herewini
- Peter Murdoch
- Ron Urlich
- Barry Ashworth
- Brad Mika
- Keven Mealamu
