= Hawke's Bay Rugby Union =

New Zealand rugby union governing body

- Sport: Rugby union
- Jurisdiction: Hawke's Bay, also including Dannevirke club Aotea
- Abbreviation: HBRU
- Founded: 1884; 142 years ago
- Headquarters: Napier
- President: Mavis Mullins
- Chairman: Brendan Mahony
- CEO: Jay Campbell

Official website
- www.hbmagpies.co.nz
- (New Zealand)

The Hawke's Bay Rugby Union (HBRU) is the governing body of rugby union in the Hawke's Bay region of New Zealand. The union is based in Napier.

The Hawke's Bay representative team are nicknamed The Magpies.

== History ==
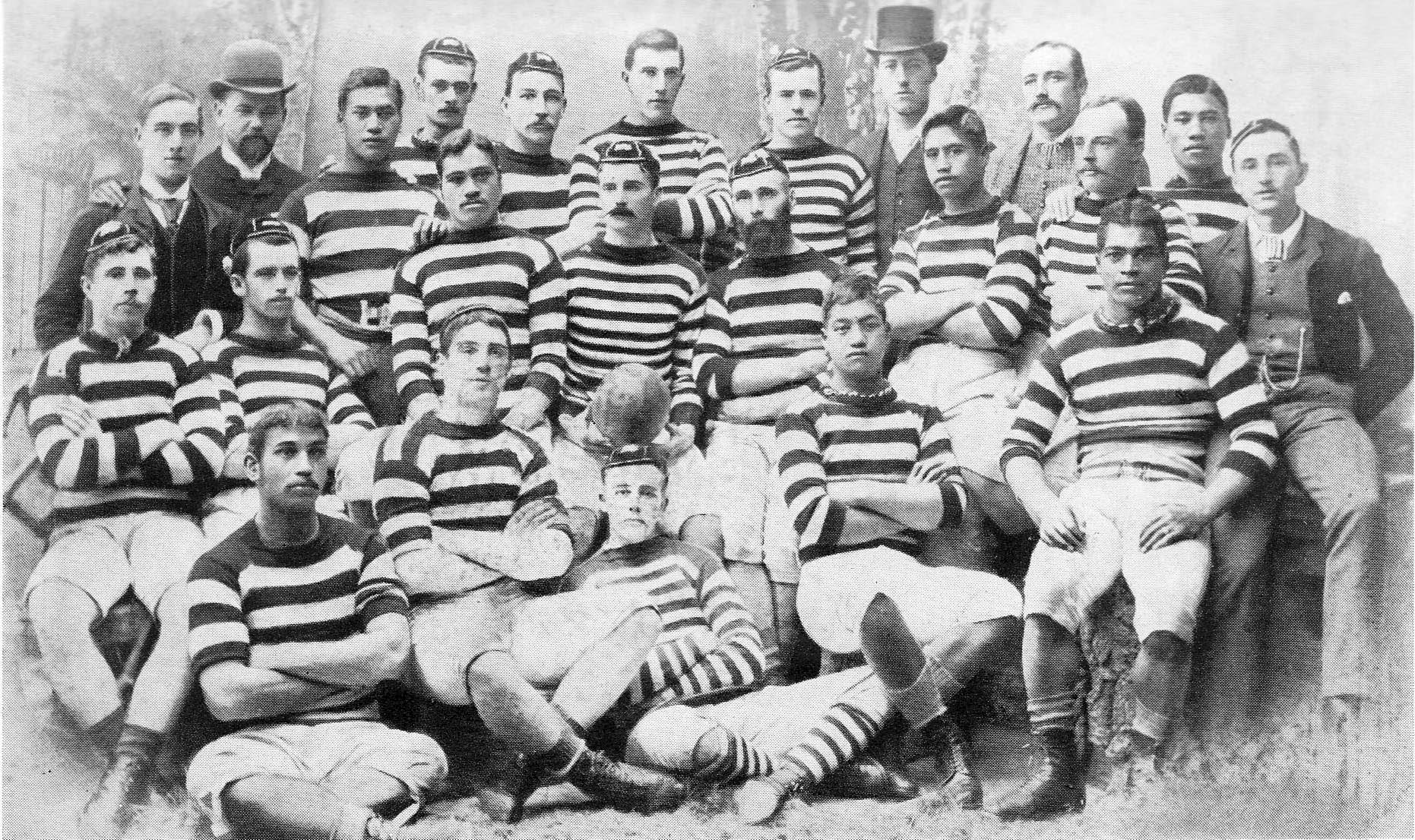
The Hawke's Bay team of 1889

The Hawke's Bay Rugby Union was founded in 1884. This makes it the oldest Provincial Rugby Union outside the four main centres. Hawke's Bay has a very good Ranfurly Shield record with 24 defences from 1922 to 1927, 21 successful defences between 1966 and 1969 as well as 2 defences in 1934. Hawke's Bay won the shield again, claiming it from Otago, on 1 September 2013. They lost the shield soon after to Counties-Manukau, before winning it back from them in August 2014 and holding it for eleven defences until October 2015. Hawke's Bay next held the Shield for 14 defences between October 2020 and September 2022 before losing it to Wellington, and they then regained it back from Wellington on 30 September 2023. Because of relatively few periods of holding the Ranfurly Shield and some long series of defences, Hawke's Bay holds the record for the highest average number of defences per Shield era.

Hawke's Bay's glory days as a rugby union came long before the NPC was founded. As such Hawke's Bay does not have a very flattering record in either that competition or the Air New Zealand Cup. The best position they have managed in either is 3rd. Hawke's Bay dominated the second division of the NPC in the 1990s before the Air New Zealand Cup was set up in 2006.

In 1996, Hawke's Bay and Manawatu merged their teams to form the Central Vikings. It was an attempt to elevate the unions back to the then first division. Players including Mark "Bull" Allen, Christian Cullen, Mark Ranby, Stephen Bachop and Roger Randle featured in the team. The 1997 season saw Central finish overall second with 6 wins, 2 losses and into the semi-finals. In the semi-final, the Vikings avenged their loss to Bay of Plenty in round robin play to face Northland in the final. Northland won the final 63–10. Northland were thus promoted to the First Division. However, had the Vikings won, they would not have been eligible to be promoted. 1998 saw a repeat of form for the Vikings who went unbeaten in the season. They subsequently won the final against Bay of Plenty at McLean Park, Napier and were promoted to First Division. However, due to financial issues, the merger split back to Hawke's Bay and Manawatu. Both unions subsequently became foundation unions of the Air New Zealand Cup which started in 2006.

In the past, Hawke's Bay has produced some great All Blacks, including Kel Tremain and George Nēpia. Hawke's Bay also defeated the 1993 British Lions and in 1994 defeated France (who beat the All Blacks twice in that same tour).

=== Super Rugby application ===
In 2009, Hawke's Bay announced they intended to apply to join the Super Rugby competition, when it was announced a fifteenth franchise was to be created. However, in August 2009 the club's chairman Richard Hunt announced they were withdrawing their bid because they had not had sufficient time to present a business plan. He insisted the club remained very serious about joining the club in the future. Hawke's Bay would be New Zealand's sixth team if they were to join Super Rugby. With the announcement that New Zealand might receive a 6th Super Franchise in the SANZAAR Super Rugby competition beginning 2016, the Hawke's Bay Union announced its interest in forming this franchise together with Manawatu, therefore effectively resurrecting the Central Vikings brand as a Super Rugby franchise.

== Club rugby ==
=== Format ===
After the 2019 club rugby season, changes to the two highest divisions of men's club rugby in Hawke's Bay were announced. Because the first round of the club rugby season of 2020 was cancelled due to the COVID-19 pandemic, these changes only took effect in 2021.

The new format is as follows. In the first round of the season, ten Premier teams play for the Nash Cup. Only the top eight sides from the Nash Cup will play in the second round for the Maddison Trophy. The two lowest ranked Nash Cup teams will play in a modified Division 1 competition for the new Hepa Paewai Memorial Trophy, along with the six best teams of the round 1 Town & Country competition (two of five Country teams, four of 12 Town teams).

At the end of the second round, the two clubs that reach the Division 1 final will earn promotion to the following year's Nash Cup, unless those clubs already have a Premier team in the Nash Cup competition. In that situation, the promotion goes to one or both of the beaten semi-finalists (if eligible themselves). In case two beaten semi-finalists are in contention for one spot in the Nash Cup competition, the winner of the earlier round-robin match between the two clubs will earn the promotion.

The new format doesn't only introduce the new Hepa Paewai Memorial Trophy for Division 1, but also sees the introduction of a new trophy for Division 2, the Tom Mulligan Cup.

There are no changes to the format of the women's, division 3 and colts' competitions.

=== 2023 Format variation ===
The 2023 season brought several changes to the club rugby competition format.

Eleven premiers club teams competed for the 2023 Nash Cup in a 10-week round robin competition with the highest ranked team claiming the Cup. The six (not eight) teams that ranked highest on the Nash Cup table played for the Maddison Trophy in the second round of the premiers competition.

The five teams at the bottom of the Nash Cup table played in Division 1 for the Hepa Paewai Trophy. The sixth team in Division 1 would have been the winner of the Town & Country final, but neither of the finalists – Napier Old Boys Marist RFC Premiers Reserves (ineligible) or Ōtāne Sports Club (opted out) – did take that spot in the Division 1 round 2 competition and instead played in Division 2 for the Tom Mulligan Cup with the other club teams finishing in the top 3 of the Country grade and the top 5 of the Town grade.

The Town & Country grade was played in three separate pools. The five teams in the Country grade (one pool) played four round robin games, with the highest ranked team winning the Arthur Brown Cup and qualifying for the Town v Country final. The ten Town teams played five round robin games in two pools of five clubs. The highest ranked teams of each pool played each other for the Jack Swain Cup and a place in the Town v Country final. The winner of that Town v Country final earned the Pratt Trophy.

The two lowest ranked Country teams and five Town teams that didn't qualify for Division 2 in round 2 of the club rugby competition, played in Division 2A for a new trophy.

In round 1 of Division 3, nine teams competed for the Maury Coady Cup in an 8-game round robin. The four highest ranked teams played in round 2 for the Ron Parker Memorial Trophy. Four of the remaining teams played in a new Division 3A for the inaugural AJ Gardiner Trophy. Both Division 3 and 3A consisted of three round robin games, with the two highest ranked teams playing a Final.

Five teams competed in the women's grade, with the highest ranked team after the round robin winning the Marsh Cup and the top two teams playing for the Championship Cup. Different from previous years, the women's teams only played one round in 2023.

In the Colts grade, eight club teams played a round robin in pools of four teams, with the top two of each pool playing finals for the Arthur Brown Cup in round 1. In round 2, all eight teams played a 7-game round robin, with the top 4 teams playing for the Pat Ryan Memorial Trophy and the next four teams for a new Colts A-grade trophy.

=== Competition winners ===
==== 2026 season ====
Round one champions:

- 2026 Nash Cup (Premier): Napier Old Boys Marist RFC
- 2026 Jack Swain Cup (Town grade): Tamatea Rugby & Sports Club
- 2026 Arthur Bowman Cup (Country grade): Ōtāne Sports Club
- 2026 Maury Coady Cup (Division 3): Napier Pirate Rugby & Sports Club
- 2026 Marsh Cup (Women's grade): Maori Agricultural College (MAC) Sports Association
- 2026 Arthur Brown Cup (Colts): Napier Old Boys Marist RFC

Round two champions:

- 2026 Maddison Trophy (Premier): Taradale Rugby & Sports Club
- 2026 Hepa Paewai Memorial Trophy (Division 1): Ōtāne Sports Club
- 2026 Tom Mulligan Cup (Division 2): Maraenui Rugby & Sports Association
- 2026 Neil Thimbleby Memorial Trophy (Division 2A): Onga-Tiko Rugby & Sports Club
- 2026 Ron Parker Memorial Cup (Division 3): Napier Pirate Rugby & Sports Club
- 2026 AJ Gardiner Trophy (Division 3A): Napier Old Boys Marist RFC
- 2026 Championship Cup (Women's grade): Napier Tech Old Boys Rugby Club
- 2026 Pat Ryan Memorial Trophy (Colts): Taradale Rugby & Sports Club

==== Recent premier club finals ====
Maddison shield

- 2026 - Taradale 54-24 Napier Old Boys-Marist
- 2025 - Taradale 47-40 Napier Pirates
- 2024 - Taradale 28-15 Napier Old Boys-Marist
- 2023 - Tech Old Boys 36-34 Taradale
- 2022 - Taradale 33-28 Tech Old Boys

== School rugby ==
The Hawke's Bay Rugby Union administers a secondary schools rugby competition, consisting of several boys' grades and two girls' grades. The strongest boys' schools teams, however, compete in interregional competitions. Hastings Boys' High School and Napier Boys' High School, compete in the Super 8 competition in multiple grades, while Lindisfarne College and St John's College, Hastings currently participate in the Central North Island (CNI) 1st XV competition.

Napier Boys High School 1st XV won the Super 8 in 2000, 2002 and 2003 and most recently made the Final in 2023. Hastings Boys High School 1st XV won the competition in 2004, 2016, shared the title with Hamilton Boys' High School in 2017, and most recently reached the Final in 2021.

Both schools also regularly feature in the (seeded) semi-finals to be played for the Hurricanes Cup against the winner of the Wellington Premiership school rugby competition and the highest ranked school from the Hurricanes region in the CNI competition. The winner of the Hurricanes Cup represents the Hurricanes region in the National First XV Championship or Top 4. In the most recent years, the Hurricanes Cup was won by a Hawke's Bay 1st XV team: in 2016, 2017 and 2019 by Hastings Boys High School and in 2018, 2021 and 2022 by Napier Boys High School. Due to the COVID-19 pandemic, the Hurricanes Cup and Top 4 were not played for in 2020; the Top 4 has also been cancelled for 2021.

== Provincial rugby ==
Hawke's Bay made their debut, along with Tasman, Manawatu and Counties-Manukau, in the 2006 Air New Zealand Cup which had 14 teams. Hawkes Bay made their best effort to date in the 2007 Air New Zealand Cup, winning many games even against bigger unions such as Wellington and Waikato. They were the fairytale story of the competition, surprising everyone to reach the semi-finals where they were beaten by Auckland. They repeated this form in the 2008 and 2009 seasons where they were again beaten semi-finalists. This form in back to back seasons attracted warranted attention and many Hawke's Bay players were awarded with Super 14 contracts, both for the Hurricanes and elsewhere.

=== Records ===
==== Most appearances ====
- 158 – Neil Thimbleby 1959–71
- 147 – Richard Hunt 1967–83
- 125 – R.P. (Robbie) Hunter 1971–82
- 120 – Robbie Stuart 1967–80
- 111 – Orcades Crawford 1988–2000
- 108 – Bill Davis 1961–71
- 100 – K.K. (Karaan) Crawford 1964–71
- 100 – M.R. (Murdoch) Paewai 1991–2003

==== Most points ====
- 1,007 – Jarrod Cunningham 1990–98
- 631 – Ian Bishop 1963–72
- 628 - Ihaia West 2012-2017
- 435 – Tony Small 1957–65
- 386 – P.G. (Peter) O'Shaughnessy 1981–90
- 343 – Matthew Cooper 1985–89
- 339 – Bert Grenside 1919–31
- 311 – R.P. (Robbie) Hunter 1971–82
- 304 – T.J. (Tim) Manawatu 2001–03

==== Most tries ====
- 74 – Bert Grenside 1919–31
- 68 – R.P. (Robbie) Hunter 1971–82
- 55 – Bill Davis 1961–71
- 50 – Kel Tremain 1962–70
- 45 – Paul Cooke 1985–89
- 44 – D.B. (Dennis) Smith 1964–70

== Hawke's Bay All Blacks ==
- Snow Bowman
- Cyril Brownlie
- Laurie Brownlie
- Maurice Brownlie
- Jackie Blake
- Bill Collins
- Bert Cooke
- Matt Cooper
- Tommy Corkill
- Israel Dagg
- Doug Dalton
- Bill Davis
- Mark Donaldson
- Mick Duncan
- Hika Elliot
- David Evans
- Bryn Evans
- Gareth Evans
- Folau Fakatava
- Ben Franks
- Harry Frazer
- Blair Furlong
- Sam Gemmell
- Bert Grenside
- Zac Guildford
- Norm Hewitt
- Graeme Higginson
- Bull Irvine
- Everard Jackson
- Alexander Kirkpatrick
- Danny Lee
- Ian MacRae
- Hawea Mataira
- Jim McCormick
- Jack McNab
- Jimmy Mill
- George Nēpia
- Jack Ormond
- Lui Paewai
- Tori Reid
- Brodie Retallick
- Pat Ryan
- Mark Shaw
- Frank Shelford
- Dick Steere
- Robbie Stuart
- Tuna Swain
- Ken Taylor
- Mark Taylor
- Neil Thimbleby
- Hoeroa Tiopira
- Kel Tremain
- Brad Weber
