= Neil Wolfe =

New Zealand rugby union player

Neil Wolfe MNZM
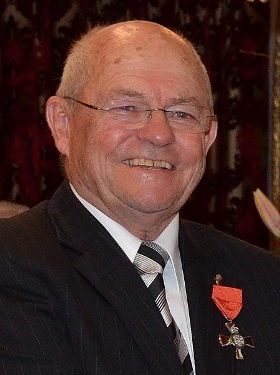
- Wolfe in 2015
- Born: Thomas Neil Wolfe; 20 October 1941 (age 85) New Plymouth, New Zealand
- Height: 1.63 m (5 ft 4 in)
- Weight: 67 kg (148 lb)
- School: New Plymouth Boys' High School
- University: Victoria University of Wellington
- Notable relative(s): Katie Wolfe (daughter); Tim Balme (son-in-law)
- Occupation: Businessman

Rugby union career
- Position(s): First five-eighth Second five-eighth Centre
Provincial / State sides
Years	Team	Apps	(Points)
1960–1962	Wellington		
1963–1969	Taranaki	71	
International career
Years	Team	Apps	(Points)
1960–1962	NZ Universities	6	(0)
1961–1968	New Zealand		

Thomas Neil Wolfe MNZM (born 20 October 1941) is a former New Zealand rugby union player, businessman, sports administrator and local politician. He played 14 matches, including six Tests, for the New Zealand national rugby team, the All Blacks, between 1961 and 1968. He was active in sports administration, including as president of the Taranaki Rugby Union and the Taranaki Jockey Club, and served as a New Plymouth district councillor between 2004 and 2010.

== Early life and family ==
Wolfe was born in New Plymouth on 20 October 1941, the son of Welsh-born Mary Wolfe (née Thomas) and Harry Wolfe, originally from Australia. He was educated at New Plymouth Boys' High School, where he played for the school's 1st XV rugby team for four years, coached by JJ Stewart, and was captain of the team in his final year, 1959. He went on to study accountancy at Victoria University of Wellington from 1960 to 1962.

Wolfe met his future wife, nurse Raewyn Phillips, in 1963. The couple married at St Mary's Church, New Plymouth, in April 1966, and went on to have four children, including television actress and film director Katie Wolfe, and Todd Wolfe, who played provincial rugby for Taranaki.

== Rugby union career ==
Wolfe played his rugby as a first five-eighth, second five-eighth or centre.

During his three years at university, Wolfe played representative rugby for New Zealand Universities (NZU) and Wellington. With the NZU team, he toured Australia with the in 1960, and California and Canada in early 1962. He made his Wellington debut in 1960 as an 18-year-old, and his dazzling footwork soon brought him national attention, and rough treatment from opposition loose forwards.

Wolfe was on the fringe of national selection in 1960, and was first selected for the All Blacks for the first Test against the touring French team at Eden Park on 22 July 1961. Aged 19 years 275 days, Wolfe was, at the time, the seventh youngest All Blacks player on Test debut, and as of 2021 remains the 10th-youngest of all time. Standing 1.63 metres (5 ft 4 in) tall, he is also one of the shortest All Blacks ever. He appeared in the second and third tests against France, and the following year toured Australia with the national side, playing in six of the 10 matches including both Tests against Australia. When the Australian team toured New Zealand later that season, Wolfe played at first five-eighth in the first Test at Carisbrook, but Bruce Watt and Mack Herewini were preferred in that position for the second and third Tests.

After completing his university studies, Wolfe returned to New Plymouth at the end of 1962, and represented Taranaki 71 times from 1963 to 1969. He was a part of the team during their tenure of the Ranfurly Shield with 15 successful defences of the trophy from 1963 to 1965.

Wolfe's international career continued in 1963, playing at second five-eighth in the first Test at Eden Park against the touring England team. However, he was dropped for the second Test, with Pat Walsh preferred. Wolfe broke his arm playing against Waikato later in the season, and did not play for the All Blacks again until being selected for the 1968 tour of Australia during which he appeared in four matches but did not play in any of the internationals.

Wolfe retired from rugby in 1969, having played 146 first-class matches, including All Black trials and inter-island games for the North Island. He played 14 games for the All Blacks including six Tests.

== Business career ==
Wolfe became the owner of Taranaki's last-remaining soft-drink manufacturer, Western Bottling Company Limited, after his father died in 1977. The company had been built up by his father and uncles after they purchased it in the 1930s and later began manufacturing Coca-Cola under licence. Wolfe expanded the operation further before selling the business to Auckland-based Oasis Industries in 1988.

== Community involvement ==
Wolfe has had wide involvement in sports and community organisations in Taranaki. He was vice-president and president of the Taranaki Rugby Football Union, president of the Taranaki Jockey Club, chair of the Taranaki Racing District, and a member of the New Plymouth Stadium board. He served as chair of the New Plymouth Central School board of trustees and as a member of the New Plymouth Boys' High School board, including 15 years as chair. He chaired the New Zealand Community Trust regional advisory committee, which oversees the distribution of gaming proceeds to community organisations in Taranaki, and was a board member of Massey University's L. A. Alexander Agricultural Trust.

Wolfe was elected as a New Plymouth district councillor in 2004, and served two terms before retiring in 2010.

== Later life ==
In the 2015 New Year Honours, Wolfe was appointed a Member of the New Zealand Order of Merit, for services to sport, education and the community. In later years, Wolfe has suffered from dementia, thought to be linked to numerous concussions that he experienced during his rugby-playing days.
