= Barry Ashworth =

Barry Ashworth may refer to:

- Barry Ashworth (footballer) (1942–2024), English footballer
- Barry Ashworth (rugby union) (born 1949), New Zealand rugby union player
