= Peter Murdoch =

Peter Murdoch may refer to:

- Peter Murdoch (politician) (1865–1948), member of the Tasmanian House of Assembly
- Peter Murdoch of Rosehill, Scottish sugar merchant and refiner, lord provost of Glasgow
- Peter Murdoch (rugby union) (1941–1995), New Zealand rugby union player
