= Mick Williment =

- Born: Michael Williment; 25 February 1940 Wellington, New Zealand
- Died: 5 September 1994 (aged 54) Wellington, New Zealand
- Height: 1.88 m (6 ft 2 in)
- Weight: 89 kg (196 lb)
- School: Rongotai College
- University: Victoria University of Wellington
- Notable relative: Marc Ellis (nephew)
- Occupation: Travel company proprietor

Rugby union career
- Position: Fullback
Provincial / State sides
Years	Team	Apps	(Points)
1958–68	Wellington	108	
International career
Years	Team	Apps	(Points)
1962–67	NZ Universities		
1964–67	New Zealand	9	(70)

Michael Williment (25 February 1940 – 5 September 1994) was a New Zealand rugby union and cricket player, and co-founder of sports tour company Williment World Travel.

== Rugby union ==
A fullback, Williment represented Wellington at a provincial level, and was a member of the New Zealand national side, the All Blacks, from 1964 to 1967. He played nine matches for the All Blacks, all of them internationals.

== Cricket ==
Williment was also a promising cricketer. A right-arm medium-fast bowler and right-handed lower-order batsman, he played for the Wellington under-20 side in the 1958–59 and 1959-60 seasons.

== Personal and business life ==
Williment married Rosemary Leonora Frances Ellis, the daughter of Cyclax (New Zealand) general manager John Clifford Gwynne Ellis, and together the couple established Williment World Travel, a sports tour company, in 1968. Williment died from cancer in Wellington in 1994, and was buried at Taitā Lawn Cemetery. Rosemary Williment continued to run the travel business until 2001, when she sold the company to senior management. She had remarried lawyer Warren Allen in 1998, and died in 2012.
