= Derek Arnold =

New Zealand international rugby union player

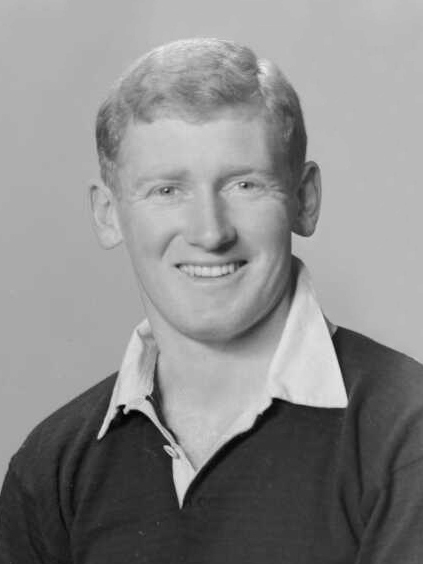
- Arnold in 1963
- Born: 10 January 1941 (age 85) Balclutha, New Zealand
- Height: 173 cm (5 ft 8 in)
- Weight: 67 kg (10 st 8 lb; 148 lb)

Rugby union career
- Position: Second five-eighth
Provincial / State sides
Years	Team	Apps	(Points)
- Canterbury
-	South Island		
International career
Years	Team	Apps	(Points)
1963-64	New Zealand		

Derek Austin Arnold (born 10 January 1941) is a New Zealand rugby union player who played for the All Blacks.

== Early life ==
Arnold was born in 1941 in Balclutha. He attended Christchurch West High School.

== Playing career ==
Arnold played for the Canterbury and South Island sides before being selected for the All Blacks 1963–64 tour of Britain, Ireland, France and North America.

Injury side-lined him in 1968 however he recovered to play again in 1969 and 1970 before retiring.

== Later years ==
During the 2011 Christchurch earthquake, Arnold narrowly missed being in the CTV Building when it collapsed.
