= Richard Hunt (rugby union) =

New Zealand rugby union player

Richie Hunt
- Born: Richard John Hunt; March 30, 1948 (age 78)
- School: Hastings Boys' High School

Rugby union career
- Position: Hooker
Provincial / State sides
Years	Team	Apps	(Points)
1967–1983	Hawke's Bay	147	(16)
Coaching career
- Years: Team
- 1986–1989: Hawke's Bay

Richard John Hunt (born 30 March 1948) is a former New Zealand rugby union player, coach and administrator.

== Biography ==
Hunt played 147 first-class games for Hawke's Bay between 1967 and 1983. In 1970 he was nominated for the Junior All Black trials.

After retiring from his long playing career he was Hawke's Bay's coach where he was known for his sharp team talks and one-liners. He later worked in haulage transport.

He became chairman of the Hawke's Bay Rugby Football Union and fought for Hawke's Bay's inclusion in the top division of the revamped Air New Zealand Cup after a 2005 reform of the National Provincial Championship. Hunt regarded helping Hawke's Bay gain premier division status in 2006 as the highlight of his career in rugby administration.

With the support of several other smaller North Island provincial unions (East Coast, Poverty Bay, Thames Valley and King Country) he stood for a seat on the New Zealand Rugby Union's board of directors against former All Black captain Graham Mourie. He was beaten 51–38 by Mourie at the 2010 New Zealand Rugby Union annual meeting. The next year he was elected to the board to fill the resignation of Jock Hobbs. He was later the president of the New Zealand Polo Association.
