= Keith Nelson (rugby union) =

New Zealand rugby union player (1938–2025)

- Born: Keith Alister Nelson; 26 November 1938 Auckland, New Zealand
- Died: 21 August 2025 (aged 86) Auckland, New Zealand
- Height: 1.85 m (6 ft 1 in)
- Weight: 95 kg (209 lb)
- School: Auckland Grammar School
- University: University of Otago
- Occupation: Dentist

Rugby union career
- Position: Loose forward
Provincial / State sides
| Years | Team | Apps | (Points) |
| 1959–1963 | Otago | | |
| 1964–1970 | Auckland | 87 | |
International career
| Years | Team | Apps | (Points) |
| 1960 | New Zealand Universities | 2 | (0) |
| 1962–1964 | New Zealand | | |

Keith Alister Nelson (26 November 1938 – 21 August 2025) was a New Zealand rugby union player. A loose forward and occasional lock, Nelson represented Otago and Auckland at a provincial level, and was a member of the New Zealand national side, the All Blacks, from 1962 to 1964. He played 18 matches for the All Blacks including two internationals.

Nelson died in Auckland on 21 August 2025, at the age of 86.
