= Dermot Payton =

New Zealand cricketer

Personal information
- Full name: Dermot Hurlston Payton
- Born: 19 February 1945 (age 81); Carterton, Wairarapa, New Zealand
- Batting: Right-handed

Domestic team information
- Years: Team
- 1964/65–1976/77: Central Districts

Career statistics
Competition	First-class	List A
Matches	51	10
Runs scored	2,475	192
Batting average	26.90	19.20
100s/50s	3/9	0/0
Top score	145	48
Balls bowled	28	8
Wickets	1	0
Bowling average	10.00	–
5 wickets in innings	0	–
10 wickets in match	0	–
Best bowling	1/10	–
Catches/stumpings	64/–	4/–
- Source: Cricinfo, 7 July 2020

Dermot Hurlston Payton (born 19 February 1945) is a former New Zealand first-class cricketer who played for Central Districts from 1965 to 1977.

An opening batsman, Payton made his highest score of 145 against Otago in 1974–75. He also represented Wairarapa in Hawke Cup cricket between 1963 and 1988, captaining the team when they held the title between February 1977 and February 1979.

He has coached cricketers for many years, including some years as coach of Central Districts. In 2009 he was awarded an International Cricket Council centenary medal for services to cricket. He is the Patron, and a life member, of the Wairarapa Cricket Association. He has a farm near Masterton.
