= Tony Small (athlete) =

New Zealand athlete

- Born: Anthony Graham Small; 19 April 1936 Dannevirke, New Zealand
- Died: 29 November 2021 (aged 85) Hastings, New Zealand
- School: Napier Boys' High School

Rugby union career
- Position: Flanker
Provincial / State sides
Years	Team	Apps	(Points)
1956–1965	Hawke's Bay	64	(435)
- Cricket career

Cricket information
- Batting: Left-handed
- Bowling: Right-arm fast-medium
- Role: Bowler

Domestic team information
- Years: Team
- 1955/56: Central Districts
- Source: Cricinfo, 29 October 2020

Anthony Graham Small (19 April 1936 – 29 November 2021) was a New Zealand athlete. He played representative cricket and rugby union.

== Biography ==
Small was born to Dannevirke farmer William Small and his wife Winifred in 1936, the youngest of nine children. He attended North Primary School in Dannevirke and then was a boarder at Napier Boys' High School from 1950 to 1953. He was Head of Hostel and in the first XV rugby team. He later became a stock buyer.

Small played ten seasons for Hawke's Bay playing mostly at flanker, frequently paired with Kel Tremain. A rare goalkicking forward, he scored a then provincial record of 435 points by the time he retired in 1965. He played in many notable matches such as the 52–12 loss to the British Lions during their 1959 tour. He kicked Hawke's Bay's only points in their 1961 and 1963 Ranfurly Shield challenges against Auckland at Eden Park, lost 5-3 and drawn 3-3 respectively, and kicking a penalty and a conversion when beaten 21-17 challenging Taranaki for the shield in New Plymouth in 1965. His final representative match was against the touring South African team's 30–12 win at McLean Park. He was later Hawke's Bay's coach, including in the inaugural National Provincial Championship season in 1976.

As a cricketer he played for Southern Hawke's Bay and was in the Central Districts squad for two seasons. He played in just one first-class match, however, in 1955/56. The match was a narrow 16-run loss at McLean Park against Canterbury, which saw them win the Plunket Shield in an exciting finish.

With his first wife Maureen, Small ran a jewellery shop in Dannevirke for some years. In retirement he moved to Havelock North in the 1990s and was active in bowls. He won three Hawke's Bay Centre bowling titles, including a Champion of Champion Triples, and eight Havelock North club titles, including once being the singles champion. He died in 2021, survived by second wife Jo, first wife Maureen, two sons, one daughter, seven grandchildren and four great-grandchildren.
