= Mick Duncan =

- Born: Michael Gordon Duncan; 8 August 1947 (age 79) Waipawa, New Zealand
- Height: 1.83 m (6 ft 0 in)
- Weight: 86 kg (190 lb)
- School: Lindisfarne College

Rugby union career
- Position: Centre, second five-eighth
Provincial / State sides
Years	Team	Apps	(Points)
1966–73	Hawke's Bay	83	
International career
Years	Team	Apps	(Points)
1971	New Zealand	2	(0)

Michael Gordon Duncan (born 8 August 1947) is a former New Zealand rugby union player. A centre and second five-eighth, Duncan represented Hawke's Bay at a provincial level, and was a member of the New Zealand national side, the All Blacks, in 1971. He played two matches for the All Blacks, both of them internationals against the touring British Lions.
