= John McCullough (rugby union) =

John Francis McCullough
- Born: 8 January 1936 (age 90) Stratford
- Height: 1.73 m (5 ft 8 in)
- Weight: 75 kg (165 lb)

Rugby union career
- Position: First five-eighth
International career
Years	Team	Apps	(Points)
1959	New Zealand	3	(0)

John Francis McCullough, All Black and Taranaki rugby football representative, was born on 8 January 1936, in Stratford, New Zealand. He attended Stratford Technical High School, playing for the First XV 1952-1954, and went on from there to be selected to the Taranaki side. He alternated between first five-eighths and second five-eighths, weighing in at 75 kg and measuring 1.73 m high. McCullough was known for his good hands, his deft turn of speed and his strong defence.

McCullough was part of a Taranaki team that still holds a special place in the history of that province. He was part of the side that drew 3-all with the Springboks in 1956, as well as the successful Ranfurly Shield triumph over Otago in 1957 and the subsequent two-year possession of the shield. McCullough made his first All Black trial appearance in 1956, and in 1959 finally found the favour of the All Black selectors for the second, third and fourth tests against the touring British Lions, playing at first five-eighths.

McCullough was overlooked for the 1960 tour of South Africa, however, and the 1959 matches proved to be the only games he played for the All Blacks. He was part of yet another successful Ranfurly Shield challenge when Taranaki beat Wellington in 1963, and played a total of 94 games for his home province.
