= Bob Graham (rugby union) =

New Zealand rugby union player and coach (1936–2021)

- Born: Robert Harold Graham; 13 August 1936 New Plymouth, New Zealand
- Died: 19 October 2021 (aged 85)
- School: New Plymouth Boys' High School
- University: Auckland University College
- Notable relative(s): John Graham (brother); Beauden Barrett (grandson-in-law)
- Occupation: Business advisor

Rugby union career
- Position: Blindside flanker
Provincial / State sides
Years	Team	Apps	(Points)
1958–1965	Auckland	103	(42)
-	North Island		
International career
Years	Team	Apps	(Points)
- Junior All Blacks
–	New Zealand Universities		
Coaching career
- Years: Team
- 1966–1969: Auckland
- 1972–1974: Auckland University RFC

Robert Harold Graham (13 August 1936 – 19 October 2021) was a New Zealand rugby union player and coach.

A blindside flanker, Graham represented Auckland at a provincial level from 1958 to 1965, playing 103 games, and captained the side from 1960. He was a Junior All Black in 1959, appearing in their 29–9 loss to the touring British Isles team. He was on the fringe of full national selection, playing an All Black trial as a team captain in 1961, and captaining The Rest in a 20–8 loss against the All Blacks in 1960.

Graham went on to coach the Auckland provincial team from 1966 to 1969. He also coached the Auckland University RFC team from 1972 to 1974, leading them to win the Gallaher Shield in 1974. He was president of the New Zealand Barbarians club between 1982 and 1983, a life member of the Auckland Rugby Union, and a life trustee of the Halberg Disability Sport Foundation.

Born in New Plymouth on 13 August 1936, and educated at New Plymouth Boys' High School, Graham graduated from Auckland University College with a Bachelor of Commerce degree in 1958. He was a founding partner of business advisory consultants Brown Woolley Graham that eventually became Grant Thornton New Zealand.

Graham was the brother of Sir John Graham, and his granddaughter Hannah Laity married Beauden Barrett. He died on 19 October 2021.
