= Neil Thimbleby =

- Born: Neil William Thimbleby; 19 June 1939 Lower Hutt, New Zealand
- Died: 19 March 2024 (aged 84) Napier, New Zealand
- Height: 1.78 m (5 ft 10 in)
- Weight: 98 kg (216 lb)
- School: Marton District High School

Rugby union career
- Position: Prop
Provincial / State sides
Years	Team	Apps	(Points)
1959–71	Hawke's Bay	158	
International career
Years	Team	Apps	(Points)
1970	New Zealand	1	(0)

Neil William Thimbleby (19 June 1939 – 19 March 2024) was a New Zealand rugby union player. A prop, Thimbleby represented Hawke's Bay at a provincial level, and was a member of the New Zealand national side, the All Blacks, on their 1970 tour to South Africa. He played 13 matches for the All Blacks on that tour, including one international. Thimbleby died in Napier on 19 March 2024, at the age of 84.
