= Earle Kirton =

New Zealand rugby union player

Earle Kirton ONZM
- Kirton in 2026
- Born: Earle Weston Kirton; 29 December 1940 (age 85) Taumarunui, New Zealand
- School: St Patrick's College, Silverstream
- University: University of Otago
- Notable relative: Rex Kirton (brother)
- Occupation: Dental surgeon

Rugby union career
- Position: First five-eighth
Provincial / State sides
Years	Team	Apps	(Points)
1960–1969	Otago		
International career
Years	Team	Apps	(Points)
1963–1970	New Zealand	13	(12)

Earle Weston Kirton ONZM (born 29 December 1940) is a former New Zealand rugby union player and coach. A first five-eighth, he played for the New Zealand national team, the All Blacks, between 1963 and 1970, and later coached Wellington to win the National Provincial Championship (NPC) title in 1986.

== Biography ==
Kirton was born in Taumarunui on 29 December 1940, and educated at St Joseph's Convent School in Upper Hutt and St Patrick's College, Silverstream. His younger brother was Rex Kirton.

Kirton studied at the University of Otago and played for the Otago provincial rugby team from 1960 to 1969. He was a member of the New Zealand team on their 1963–64 tour of Britain, Ireland, France and North America and the 1967 tour of Britain, France and Canada. In 1968, he toured Australia and Fiji with the All Blacks, and played in all three tests against the visiting French team. The following year, he played in both tests against the touring Welsh team, and in 1970 he was in the All Blacks team for their tour of South Africa. In all, Kirton made 49 appearances for the All Blacks, including 13 in test matches, and scored 42 points (12 test points, four tries).

In 1971, Kirton took up a two-year dentistry fellowship at the Royal College of Surgeons, and also played for and captained Harlequins. He also turned out for Middlesex and the Barbarians.

After returning to New Zealand, Kirton was selector–coach of the Wellington provincial side in 1986 and 1987, guiding them to the NPC title in 1986 and to second in the championship the following year. He served as a national selector in 1988 and from 1992 to 1995.

In the 2026 King’s Birthday Honours, Kirton was appointed an Officer of the New Zealand Order of Merit, for services to rugby.
