= Nev MacEwan =

New Zealand rugby union player (1934–2026)

- Born: Ian Neven MacEwan; 1 May 1934 Auckland, New Zealand
- Died: 11 March 2026 (aged 91)
- Height: 1.92 m (6 ft 4 in)
- Weight: 105 kg (231 lb)
- School: Nelson College
- Occupation(s): School teacher Shipping agent Travel agent Public relations officer Prison chaplain Celebrant; B&B owner

Rugby union career
- Position(s): Lock and number eight
Provincial / State sides
Years	Team	Apps	(Points)
1954–1967	Wellington	133	
International career
Years	Team	Apps	(Points)
1956–1962	New Zealand	20	(6)

Ian Neven MacEwan (1 May 1934 – 11 March 2026) was a New Zealand rugby union player. A lock and number eight, he played 52 games for the New Zealand national side, the All Blacks, between 1956 and 1962, including 20 test matches.

== Early life ==
Born in Auckland on 1 May 1934, MacEwan was educated at Nelson College from 1949 to 1952, and played in the school's 1st XV in 1951 and 1952.

== Rugby career ==
A lock and number eight, MacEwan represented Wellington at a provincial level, making 133 appearances for the province between 1954 and 1967. He was a member of the All Blacks from 1956 to 1962, and played 52 matches for the side, including 20 internationals. He captained the All Blacks in three tour matches, against Northern Transvaal and Eastern Province in 1960, and Newcastle in 1962.

== Later life ==
MacEwan released his autobiography entitled When the Crowd Stops Roaring in 2019. In the book, he described his struggles with alcoholism, leading to a theft conviction and suicide attempt in 1979, and his later recovery.

MacEwan died on 11 March 2026, at the age of 91.
