= Ross Brown (rugby union) =

- Born: Ross Handley Brown; 8 September 1934 New Plymouth, Taranaki, New Zealand
- Died: 20 May 2014 (aged 79) New Plymouth, Taranaki, New Zealand
- Height: 1.75 m (5 ft 9 in)
- Weight: 74 kg (163 lb; 11 st 9 lb)
- School: Kings College

Rugby union career
- Position: Five-eighth
Provincial / State sides
| Years | Team | Apps | (Points) |
| 1953–68 | Taranaki | 144 | (209) |
International career
| Years | Team | Apps | (Points) |
| 1955–62 | New Zealand | 25 | (27) |

Ross Handley Brown (8 September 1934 – 20 May 2014) was a New Zealand rugby union footballer. He played 16 test matches (25 total games), most frequently in the first-five back position, for New Zealand's national rugby team, the All Blacks, from 1955 until 1962.

== Career ==
Ross Brown, one of the finest backs produced by Taranaki where he was always affectionately known as "Pascoe," ended his long, illustrious career, both for his province and the All Blacks, as something of a paradox. Brown's career which embraced 207 first class games, and well in excess of 100 for Taranaki, came in two distinct stages.

In the first, between 1955 and 1962, either first five-eighth or in the midfield at either centre or second five, he was a regular All Black selection. Yet then he was frequently criticised for being too much of a runner and not possessing a good enough kicking game.

In his second phase, from 1963 until he retired four or five years later, he was criticised, but this time, much to the bemusement of the genial Brown himself, he was constantly under attack for what was seen as excessive use of the boot.

This undoubtedly stemmed from the leading role he had as the captain and first five in the Taranaki side which held the Ranfurly Shield between 1963–65. Brown was a potent weapon for Taranaki with his suddenly found talent for dropped goals. He landed 10 alone in the 1964 season, including three in a shield defence against North Auckland.

That Brown should be regarded as primarily a kicker was ironic, particularly for the man himself. As a youngster he had always been a runner and even in his latter years would have loved to have been seen more as an attacker. Rather than being remembered as a marksman dropkicker Brown got more pleasure from the fact he scored 70-odd tries in his first class career and created many others.

In the mid 1960s Brown was regarded by his Taranaki coach and close friend, John Stewart, as being at the top of his game. Yet because he was now perceived as being only a kicker he found himself left out of All Black sides and being judged as not fitting the 15-man game being advocated by the then coach, Fred Allen.

Brown, however, had the satisfaction of a rewarding career and a lengthy stint as an All Black, especially in the mid to late 1950s.

Brown had an excellent rugby pedigree, being the son of Handley, a three quarter in the famous 1924-25 Invincibles, and was the nephew of Henry, also an All Black three quarter on the 1935-36 tour of Britain.

From his first XV days as a boarder at Auckland's King's College (1st XV 1951–52, 1st XI captain and athletics champion) it was clear that Brown was an outstanding rugby talent and while still a teenager made his debut for Taranaki in 1953 and one year later played for the North in the annual interisland match.

Aged only 20, he received his first test cap as a centre against Australia at Eden Park in 1955. He was in the midfield for the opening three tests against the 1956 Springboks but moved into five-eighth during the third test at Lancaster Park.

He immediately placed a precise cross kick which produced a try for left wing Ron Jarden and remained at fly-half for the fourth test a fortnight later at Eden Park.

Even though in those years he was usually at centre for Taranaki, particularly during the 1957-59 shield reign, Brown was pretty much the All Blacks' first choice at fly-half for the next two or three seasons. Unfortunately, for family reasons he was not available for the 1960 tour of South Africa.

But he regained his All Black place for the 1961 test series against France playing at second five. He made the tour of Australia a year later but then dropped out of national reckoning despite continuing to be a key player for Taranaki for many subsequent years. He was named the Taranaki Sportsman of the Year in the inaugural Taranaki Sports Awards in 1965.

In all Brown played 25 matches for the All Blacks including 16 tests, one regret from his international career being the fact he never went on one of the landmark major tours of his time to either South Africa or Britain and France. He toured only twice with the All Blacks, to Australia, in 1957 and 1962, but was also a member of the powerful New Zealand Under 23 team that toured Hong Kong and Japan in 1958.

His brother Don represented Taranaki 1954 and King Country 1957 whilst his son Andrew played for Manawatu in 1985 and Taranaki 1986.

Brown married Vivienne in 1965 in Te Awamatu and the pair lived all their married life in New Plymouth where he worked as a timber merchant. He died in New Plymouth on 20 May 2014.

== Awards and recognition ==
He was the inaugural winner of the Taranaki Sports Awards in 1965 and was inducted into the Taranaki Sports Hall of Fame in 2016.

The Ross Brown Shield competition was first played for in 1976 by teams from the four home zones of the Northern Taranaki Primary Schools Rugby Union. Dave McColl, at the time the Primary Schools Rugby Union Chairman and TRFU executive member and Brown, who donated the trophy, were instrumental in putting together the foundations of the event which has grown into an important part of the rugby calendar.
