= Murray Wills =

- Full name: Murray Clifton Wills
- Born: 11 October 1941 (age 85) Hāwera, New Zealand
- Height: 183 cm (6 ft 0 in)
- Weight: 89 kg (196 lb)

Rugby union career
- Position: Flanker
International career
Years	Team	Apps	(Points)
1967	New Zealand		

Murray Clifton Wills (born 11 October 1941) is a New Zealand former rugby union international.

Wills, who hails from Pātea, South Taranaki, was educated at Hawera High School and made the first of his 132 provincial appearances for Taranaki in 1962 at the age of 20.

A loose forward, Wills was a member of the All Blacks squad for the 1967 tour of Britain, France and Canada. He played in five uncapped matches over the course of the tour.

Wills captained Taranaki against the 1971 British Lions.

In 2010, a sports centre named after Wills was opened in his home town of Pātea.

== See also ==
- List of New Zealand national rugby union players
