= Don McKay (rugby union) =

New Zealand rugby union player (1937–2024)

- Born: Donald William McKay; 7 August 1937 Auckland, New Zealand
- Died: 6 February 2024 (aged 86) Veliko Tarnovo, Bulgaria
- Height: 1.73 m (5 ft 8 in)
- Weight: 73 kg (161 lb)
- School: Takapuna Grammar School
- Occupation: Pharmacist

Rugby union career
- Position: Wing
Provincial / State sides
Years	Team	Apps	(Points)
1958–1966	Auckland	86	
International career
Years	Team	Apps	(Points)
1961–1963	New Zealand	5	(6)

Donald William McKay (7 August 1937 – 6 February 2024) was a New Zealand rugby union player. A wing, McKay represented Auckland at a provincial level, and was a member of the New Zealand national side, the All Blacks, from 1961 to 1963. He played 12 matches for the All Blacks including five internationals. McKay died on 6 February 2024, at the age of 86.
