= Cyclax =

British cosmetics company

Cyclax is a British cosmetics company. It was established at the end of the nineteenth century. In the UK the only older cosmetic company is Yardley.

== History ==
The Cyclax Company was founded in 1896 by Mrs Hemming (real name Frances (Fanny) Forsythe née Hamilton [1872-1934]) in a converted front room of a house at 58 South Molton Street, London, to provide beauty treatments. In 1902, Cyclax began to sell cosmetics generally and by 1910 there were over 40 preparations in the Cyclax range including skin care products, hair care products, face powders, eye lotions, lip lotions and soap. In the period before the First World War, Cyclax products went on sale in Europe and across parts of the British Empire.

=== Expansion ===
In 1919 Frances Forsythe's son, Gery Hamilton Forsythe [1896-1964], returned from the United States to help with the business and he eventually assumed control of the company. He established separate companies and local manufacturing in Australia, New Zealand, South Africa and the United States in the 1930s. Cyclax salons were also established in various parts of the world maintained by Cyclax trained staff some of whom travelled to London to become international Cyclax representatives.

=== Wartime ===
The Second World War presented some problems for Cyclax. Although the business at South Molton Street survived, the factory at Tottenham Court Road was destroyed during the London Blitz and temporary facilities had to be used until the new factory was established in Harlow New Town, Essex in 1953. Cyclax made a number of contributions to the war effort including a burn treatment and a camouflage cream. In 1939 they also released a lipstick shade named 'Auxiliary Red' that was specifically designed for service women. It has been suggested that this lipstick started the trend for the use of bright red lipsticks during the war.

=== Postwar period ===
This was a difficult time for Cyclax, as it was for many British cosmetic companies who faced heavy taxation and increased competition from American firms like Max Factor and Revlon. One prominent supporter of Cyclax during this period was Princess Elizabeth. She used a Cyclax consultant, Thelma Besant, as her Cosmetician and Beauty Adviser both before and after she was crowned. Besant advised the Queen on skin care and cosmetics for the coronation and the numerous royal tours in the early part of her reign. A Royal Warrant of Appointment was issued to Cyclax in 1961.

=== Acquisition ===
Cyclax was a family owned business until it was bought by the American merchant bankers Lehman Brothers, Inc. in 1970 on behalf of a group of private investors. They closed the salon in South Molton Street, streamlined the product line and repackaged it. Through the 1970s and 1980s the company passed through numerous owners including British American Tobacco and SmithKIine Beecham. It was sold by Richards & Appleby Ltd. in October 2018 to Three Pears Ltd who plan to rejuvenate the brand. The current product range is largely based on the use of natural ingredients and will be 100% manufactured in the UK.
