= Terry O'Sullivan (rugby union) =

New Zealand rugby union player

- Born: Terence Patrick Anthony O'Sullivan; 27 November 1936 New Plymouth, New Zealand
- Died: 25 April 1997 (aged 60) Mount Ruapehu, New Zealand
- Height: 1.73 m (5 ft 8 in)
- Weight: 70 kg (154 lb)
- School: St Patrick's College, Silverstream
- Occupation: Dairy farmer

Rugby union career
- Position(s): Second five-eighth, centre, wing
Provincial / State sides
Years	Team	Apps	(Points)
1955–1966	Taranaki	104	
International career
Years	Team	Apps	(Points)
1960–1962	New Zealand	4	(3)

Terence Patrick O'Sullivan (27 November 1936 – 25 April 1997) was a New Zealand rugby union player. A midfield back or wing, O'Sullivan represented Taranaki at a provincial level, and was a member of the New Zealand national side, the All Blacks, from 1960 to 1962. He played 16 matches for the All Blacks including four internationals.

A dairy farmer at Ōkato, O'Sullivan died while tramping on Mount Ruapehu on 25 April 1997, aged 60.
