= Ron Rangi =

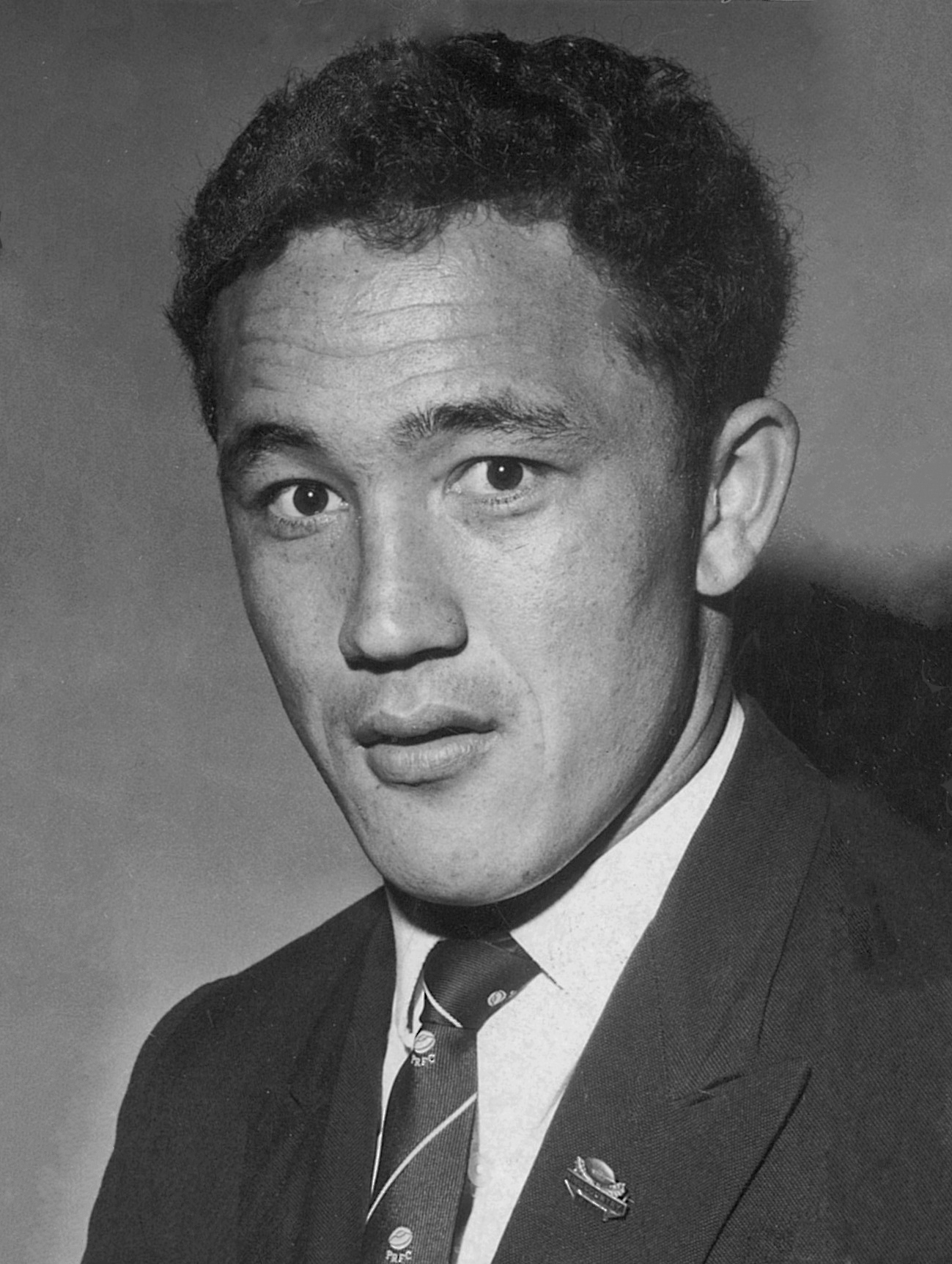
- Rangi in 1964
- Born: Ronald Edward Rangi; 4 February 1941 Auckland, New Zealand
- Died: 13 September 1988 (aged 47) Auckland, New Zealand
- Height: 1.78 m (5 ft 10 in)
- Weight: 84 kg (185 lb)

Rugby union career
- Position: Centre three-quarter
Provincial / State sides
Years	Team	Apps	(Points)
1962–68	Auckland		
International career
Years	Team	Apps	(Points)
1963–65	New Zealand Māori		
1964–66	New Zealand	10	(9)

Ronald Edward Rangi (4 February 1941 – 13 September 1988) was a New Zealand rugby union player. A centre three-quarter, Rangi represented Auckland at a provincial level, and was a member of the New Zealand national side, the All Blacks, from 1964 to 1966. He made 10 appearances for the All Blacks, all of them in test matches, scoring three tries. Of Māori descent, Rangi played for the New Zealand Māori side between 1963 and 1965, and was awarded the Tom French Cup for the Māori player of the year in 1964 and 1965.

Awards
Preceded by Mack Herewini	Tom French Memorial; Māori rugby union player of the year 1964, 1965	Succeeded by Waka Nathan
