= Waka Nathan =

New Zealand rugby union player (1940–2021)

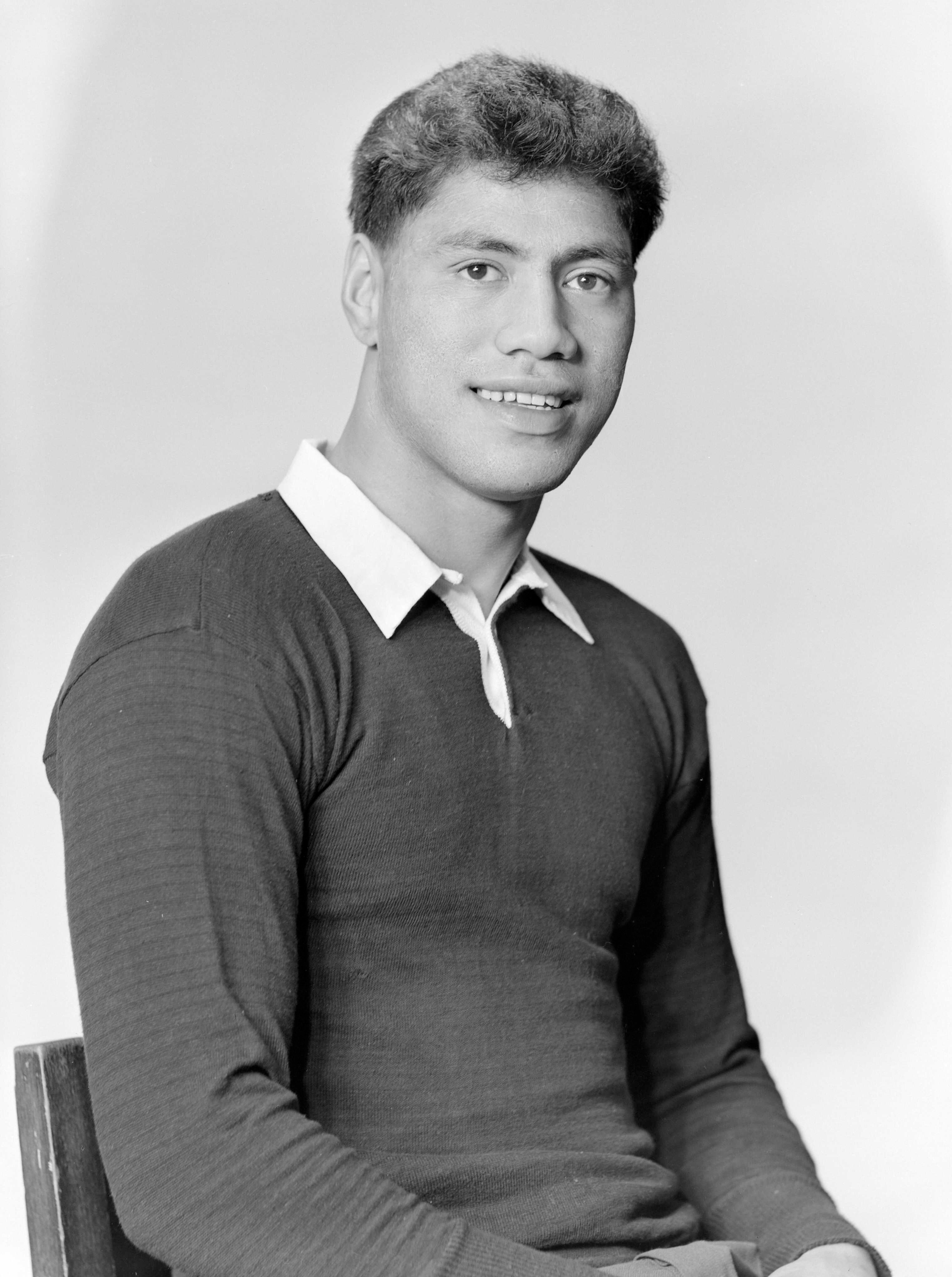
- Nathan, c. 1961
- Born: 8 July 1940 Auckland, New Zealand
- Died: 24 September 2021 (aged 81) Howick, Auckland, New Zealand
- Height: 1.80 m (5 ft 11 in)
- Weight: 92 kg (203 lb)
- School: Otahuhu College

Rugby union career
- Position: Flanker
Provincial / State sides
Years	Team	Apps	(Points)
1959–1967	Auckland	88	(51)
International career
Years	Team	Apps	(Points)
1962–1967	New Zealand	14	(12)

Waka Joseph Nathan (8 July 1940 – 24 September 2021) was a New Zealand rugby union player who played rugby union for the New Zealand national team (the "All Blacks") as a flanker. His feats on the field gained him the nickname "The Black Panther".

== Early life ==
Nathan was born in Auckland on 8 July 1940. He was one of nine children of Samuel Taia Nathan and Irene Huakore (née Randall). He attended Mangere Central Primary School and Otahuhu College. Nathan's whakapapa included Ngāpuhi, Te Roroa and Waikato Tainui.

Nathan first played rugby as a child for his primary school and secondary school. He played a notable match against Seddon Memorial Technical College during a curtain raiser to the 1956 Test match between New Zealand and Australia at Eden Park, together with his friend Mack Herewini. Otahuhu College then won the Auckland Schoolboys' competition the following year. Nathan went on to play for the Otahuhu Rugby Club.

== Rugby union career ==
Nathan played as an Auckland Rugby Union representative, making his debut in 1959 before the age of 19. He ultimately made 88 appearances and scored 51 points. He notably scored a last-minute try against Canterbury, enabling his teammate Mike Cormack to score the conversion and seal a 19–18 victory that saw Auckland successfully defending the Ranfurly Shield in 1960.

Nathan debuted for the New Zealand Māori in 1960 and played six years with the team. He also played for the All Blacks from 1962 to 1967 as a breakaway. During his All Blacks career, he was on tour to Australia, the British Isles and France. Nathan had several strong performances at the start of the 1963–64 tour, before missing six games with a broken finger. He then sustained a broken jaw against Llanelli and was informed that the injury would keep him sidelined for six months. He nonetheless scored 11 tries in 15 matches on that tour, the third-most among his teammates. He was given the nickname Le Panthère Noir ("the Black Panther") by the rugby reporter of a French newspaper, who was impressed by Nathan's ability to pursue opponents on the field like the animal. Nathan was conferred the Tom French Cup as Māori player of the year in 1962 and 1966.

Injuries – including another broken jaw during the 1967 tour in Britain – reduced Nathan to playing 14 tests for New Zealand with 13 wins with the team. He finished his test career unbeaten with 23 tries. He was described by Colin Meads as "the most virile runner with the ball in hand".

== Post-playing career ==
After his retirement from playing, Nathan was a selector and manager of the New Zealand Māori from 1971 to 1977. He also managed the New Zealand Māori on their tour of Wales and Spain in 1982. He was later chosen by New Zealand Rugby to jog onto the field and open the proceedings for the first Rugby World Cup in 1987. In 1990, Nathan was awarded the New Zealand 1990 Commemoration Medal.

Nathan was a life member of Auckland Rugby and the Otahuhu Rugby Club. He briefly served as President of the Auckland Rugby Union from 2003 to 2004, before becoming Patron of the Auckland Rugby Board. Auckland Rugby also established the Waka Nathan Challenge Cup, in recognition of Nathan's efforts to the union as a player and administrator. The competition is played between local premier club rugby teams.

== Personal life ==
Nathan was married to Janis for 56 years until his death. Together, they had three children: Alana, Claudine, and Janine.

Nathan died on 24 September 2021 in Auckland. He was 81, and suffered from dementia in the years leading up to his death. He first exhibited symptoms of the disease after the 2011 Rugby World Cup and underwent surgery to correct displaced vertebrae in order to reduce pressure to the lower part of his head.

Awards
Preceded by Vic Yates	Tom French Memorial; Māori rugby union player of the year 1962; 1966	Succeeded by Mack Herewini
Preceded by Ron Rangi	Tom French Memorial; Māori rugby union player of the year 1962; 1966	Succeeded by Sid Going
