= Hallard White =

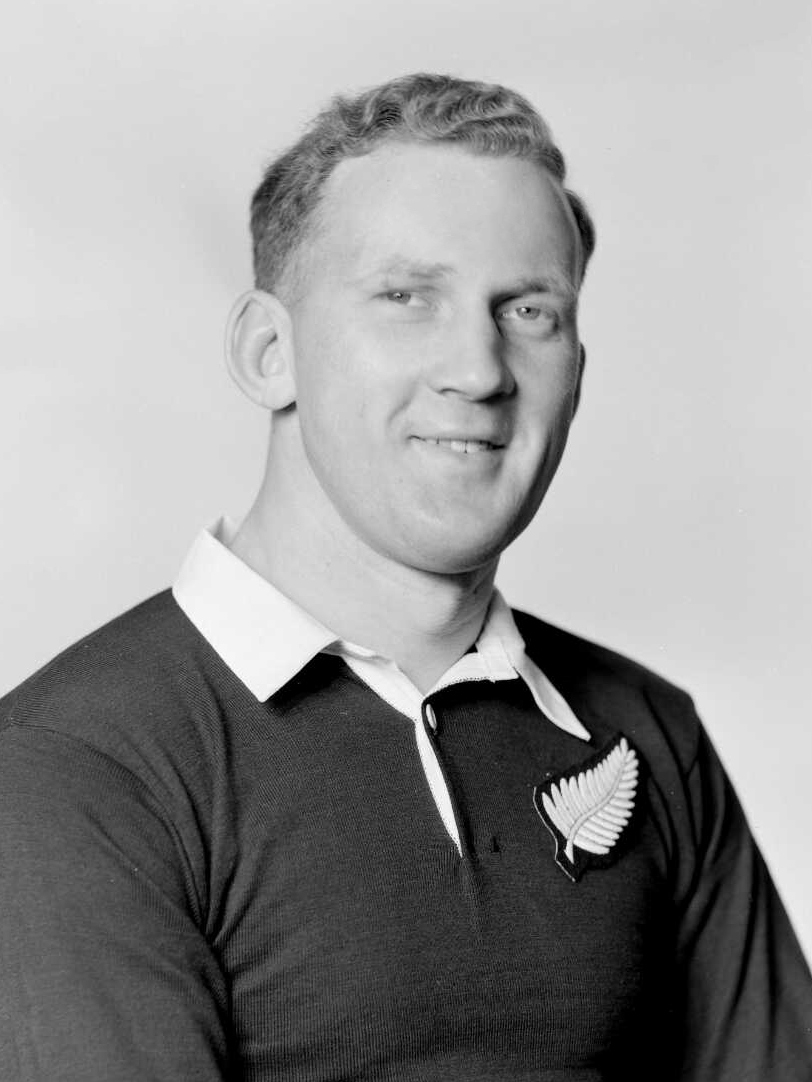
- White in 1953
- Born: Hallard Leo White; 27 March 1929 Kawakawa, New Zealand
- Died: 14 July 2016 (aged 87) Auckland, New Zealand
- Height: 1.83 m (6 ft 0 in)
- Weight: 98 kg (216 lb)
- School: Kawakawa District High School

Rugby union career
- Position: Prop
Provincial / State sides
Years	Team	Apps	(Points)
1950–63	Auckland	195	
International career
Years	Team	Apps	(Points)
1953–55	New Zealand	4	(0)

Hallard Leo "Snow" White (27 March 1929 – 14 July 2016) was a New Zealand rugby union player. A prop, White played a record 195 games for Auckland at provincial level between 1950 and 1963. He was a member of the New Zealand national side, the All Blacks, from 1953 to 1955, appearing in 16 matches including four internationals. Following his retirement as a player, White served in both coaching and administrative roles: as assistant coach of Auckland; president of the Auckland Rugby Football Union from 1989 to 1989; and president of the New Zealand Rugby Union in 1990. He died of Alzheimer's disease in Auckland on 14 July 2016.
