= Tony Davies =

NZ rugby union player (1939–2008)

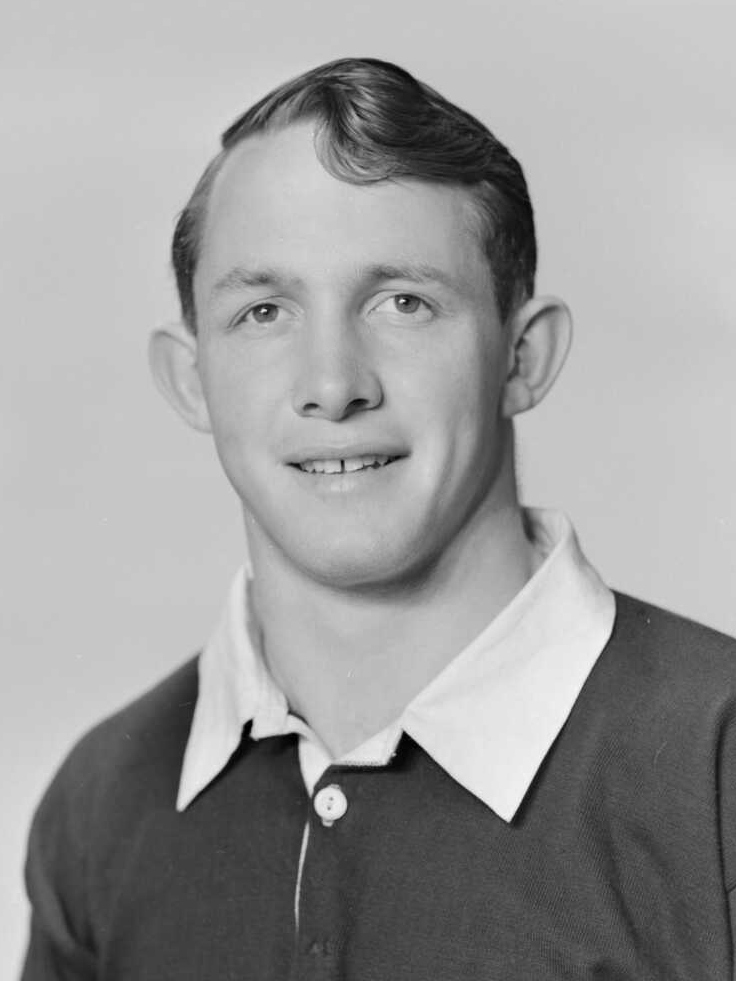
- Davies c. 1960
- Born: William Anthony Davies; 16 September 1939 Auckland, New Zealand
- Died: 6 April 2008 (aged 68) Sydney, New South Wales, Australia
- Height: 1.75 m (5 ft 9 in)
- Weight: 81 kg (179 lb)
- School: King's College
- University: Auckland University College; University of Otago

Rugby union career
- Position(s): Fullback; First five-eighth Second five-eighth
Amateur team(s)
Years	Team	Apps	(Points)
1971–72	Blackheath		
1972–74	London Irish		
Provincial / State sides
Years	Team	Apps	(Points)
1958–59	Auckland		
1961–64	Otago		
International career
Years	Team	Apps	(Points)
1960, 1962	New Zealand	3	(0)

William Anthony Davies (16 September 1939 – 6 April 2008) was a New Zealand rugby union footballer, who played 17 games for the All Blacks in 1960 and 1962 as a full-back or centre.

Davies was nominated for the All Blacks while playing for the University of Auckland's rugby union team, and made his debut on 14 May 1960 in Sydney, Australia against Queensland. His international debut was against South Africa on 27 August. He played 14 games for the All Blacks that year, then transferred to Dunedin to study medicine, where he played 39 games for the University of Otago. In 1962, Davies returned to the All Blacks for two games against Australia, bringing his total national caps to 17.

Whilst furthering his medical studies in England, Davies played for Blackheath (1971, 1972) and London Irish (1972–74).

Davies died in Sydney, Australia on 6 April 2008.
