= Barry Ashworth (rugby union) =

New Zealand rugby union player

- Born: Barry Graeme Ashworth; 23 September 1949 (age 77) Waiuku, New Zealand
- Height: 1.88 m (6 ft 2 in)
- Weight: 93 kg (205 lb)
- School: Otahuhu College

Rugby union career
- Position: Loose forward
Provincial / State sides
Years	Team	Apps	(Points)
1972–81	Auckland	74	
International career
Years	Team	Apps	(Points)
1978	New Zealand	2	(0)

Barry Graeme Ashworth (born 23 September 1949) is a former New Zealand rugby union player. A loose forward, Ashworth represented Auckland at a provincial level, and was a member of the New Zealand national side, the All Blacks, in 1978. He played seven matches for the All Blacks including two internationals.
