= John Major (rugby union) =

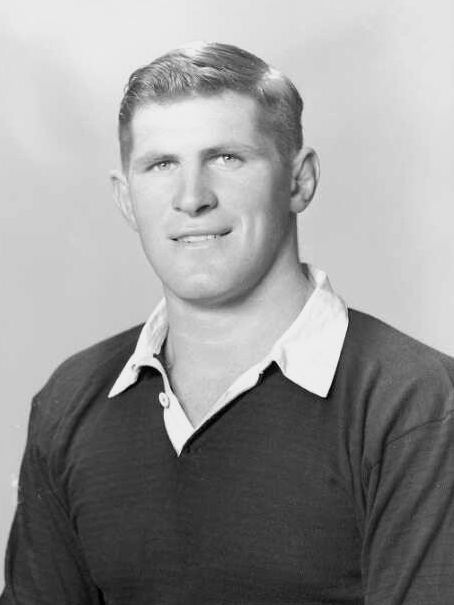
- Major c. 1963
- Born: 8 August 1940 (age 86) Whakatāne, New Zealand
- Height: 1.75 m (5 ft 9 in)
- Weight: 88 kg (194 lb)
- School: Waitara High School
- Occupation: Farmer

Rugby union career
- Position: Hooker
Provincial / State sides
Years	Team	Apps	(Points)
1961–68	Taranaki	73	
International career
Years	Team	Apps	(Points)
1963–67	New Zealand	1	(0)

John Major (born 8 August 1940) is a former New Zealand rugby union player. A hooker, Major represented Taranaki at a provincial level, and was a member of the New Zealand national side, the All Blacks, between 1963 and 1967. He played 24 matches for the All Blacks including one international.
