= Bill Davis (rugby union) =

New Zealand rugby union and softball player

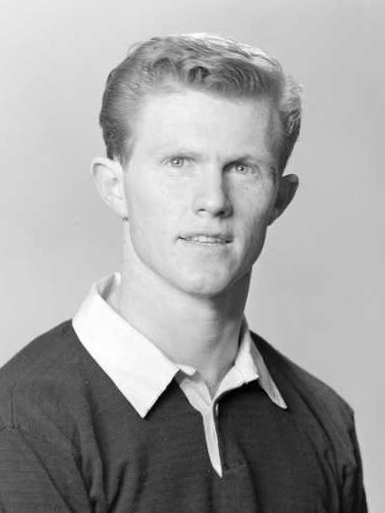
- Davis, c. 1963
- Born: William Leslie Davis; 15 December 1942 (age 83) Hastings, New Zealand
- Height: 1.80 m (5 ft 11 in)
- Weight: 74 kg (163 lb)
- School: Hastings Boys' High School
- Occupation: Sports shop owner

Rugby union career
- Position: Wing, centre
Provincial / State sides
Years	Team	Apps	(Points)
1961–71	Hawke's Bay	108	(168)
International career
Years	Team	Apps	(Points)
1963–70	New Zealand	11	(9)

William Leslie Davis (born 15 December 1942) is a former rugby union and softball player in New Zealand.

== Rugby union ==
A wing and centre, Davis represented Hawke's Bay at a provincial level, and was a member of the New Zealand national side, the All Blacks, from 1963 to 1970. He played 53 matches for the All Blacks including 11 internationals.

== Softball ==
Davis played as an outfielder for the New Zealand men's national softball team, known as the Black Socks, at the 1972 and 1976 softball world championships. In 2001, he became patron of the Rotorua Softball Association.

== Honours ==
In 2006, Davis was inducted into the Hawke's Bay sports hall of fame.
