= Malcolm Dick (rugby union) =

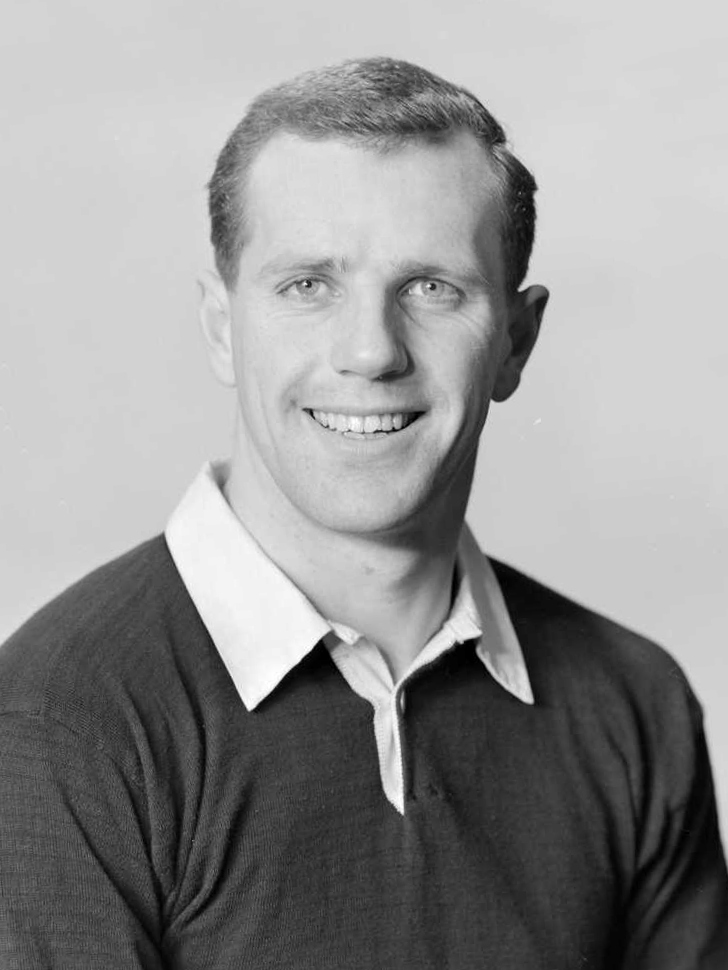
- Born: Malcolm John Dick; 3 January 1941 (age 85) Auckland, New Zealand
- Height: 1.75 m (5 ft 9 in)
- Weight: 80 kg (180 lb)
- School: Auckland Grammar School
- Notable relative: John Dick (father)
- Occupation(s): Chartered accountant, businessman

Rugby union career
- Position: Wing
Provincial / State sides
Years	Team	Apps	(Points)
1961–70	Auckland	74	
International career
Years	Team	Apps	(Points)
1963–70	New Zealand	15	(12)

Malcolm John Dick (born 3 January 1941) is a former New Zealand rugby union player and administrator. A wing three-quarter, Dick represented Auckland at a provincial level, and was a member of the New Zealand national side, the All Blacks, from 1963 to 1970. He played 55 matches for the All Blacks including 15 internationals.

Later active in the administration of the game, Malcolm served as president of the Auckland Rugby Union from 1981 to 1983 and chairman of that union's management committee from 1984 to 1990. He was a member of the New Zealand Rugby Union council between 1986 and 1992, including a period as deputy chairman. He was also the manager of the All Blacks on their 1987 tour of Japan.
