= Paul Little (rugby union) =

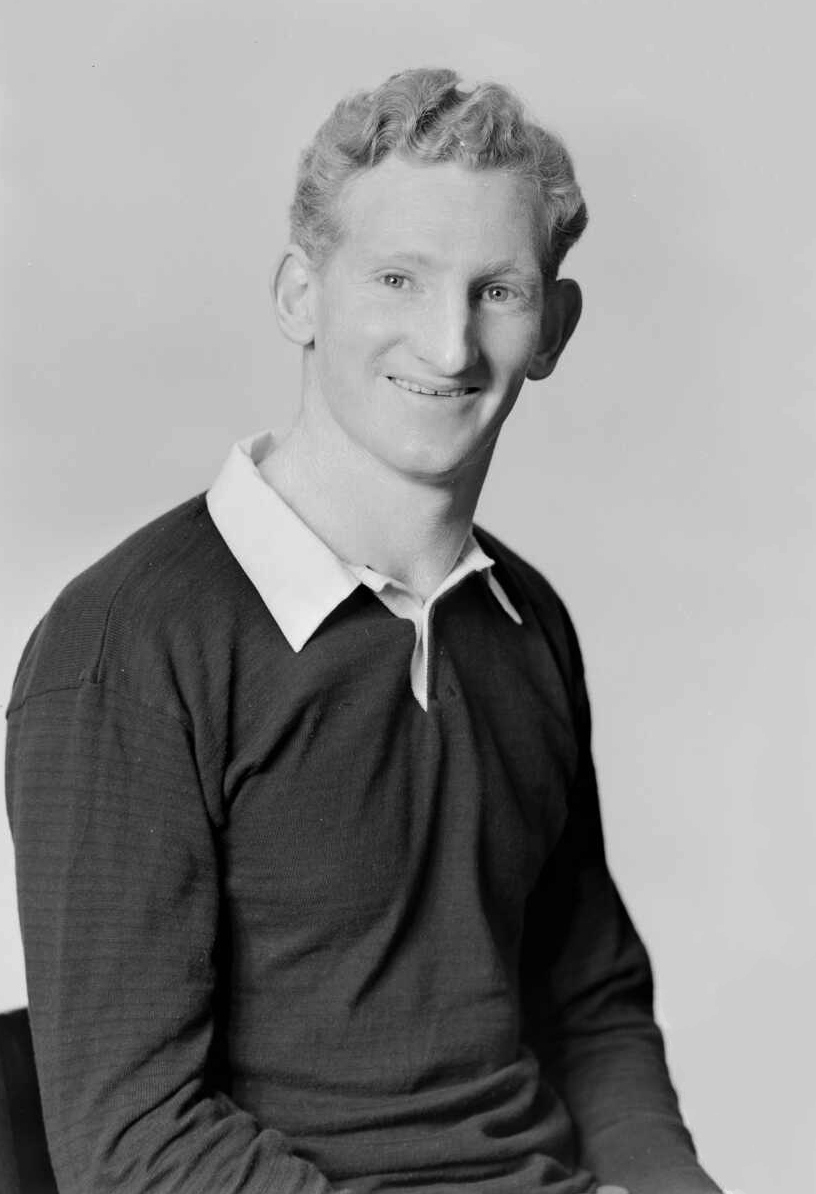
- Little in 1961
- Born: Paul Francis Little; 14 September 1934 Auckland, New Zealand
- Died: 7 August 1993 (aged 58) Auckland, New Zealand
- Height: 1.80 m (5 ft 11 in)
- Weight: 78 kg (172 lb)
- School: Marist Brothers' School, Auckland
- Occupation: Hairdresser

Rugby union career
- Position: Centre
Provincial / State sides
Years	Team	Apps	(Points)
1959–63	Auckland		
International career
Years	Team	Apps	(Points)
1961–64	New Zealand	10	(3)

Paul Francis Little (14 September 1934 – 7 August 1993) was a New Zealand rugby union player. A centre, Little represented Auckland at a provincial level, and was a member of the New Zealand national side, the All Blacks, from 1961 to 1964. He played 29 matches for the All Blacks including 10 internationals. He was a member of the Auckland Marist Rugby Club.
