= Ian Bishop (rugby union) =

New Zealand rugby union player

- Born: Ian Robert Bishop
- Height: 180 cm (5 ft 11 in)
- Weight: 79.5 kg (175 lb; 12 st 7 lb)
- School: Napier Boys' High School
- Occupation: Engineering assistant

Rugby union career
- Position: Fullback
Provincial / State sides
Years	Team	Apps	(Points)
1963–1972	Hawke's Bay	95	(631)

Ian Robert Bishop (born 1943) is a former New Zealand rugby union player.

== Biography ==
Bishop grew up in Napier and attended Napier Boys' High School. He was a player in the school's first XV rugby team, including its record best 1961 season.

In 1963, Bishop debuted for Hawke's Bay at the first-class level. He was part of the team that won the Ranfurly Shield from Waikato in 1966. In the low-scoring match he kicked a penalty goal in the second second half, after Waikato were lured offside in an infamous ruse arranged by halfback Hepa Paewai. By the time Hawke's Bay lost the shield in 1969 to Canterbury, Bishop had become the all-time leading points scorer in Ranfurly Shield matches. He was also the highest point scorer for Hawke's Bay, with 631 points, which was not surpassed until 1995 by Jarrod Cunningham.

In later life, Bishop shifted from Hawke's Bay to Hāwera. He became a successful race horse owner. Several horses he was a shareholder in won multiple races including Heineken Bay, Libra Bay, Beatle Bay and Sarah Little.
