= Peter Murdoch (rugby union) =

- Born: Peter Henry Murdoch; 17 June 1941 Auckland, New Zealand
- Died: 16 October 1995 (aged 54) Auckland, New Zealand
- Height: 1.70 m (5 ft 7 in)
- Weight: 70 kg (154 lb)
- School: Otahuhu College

Rugby union career
- Position(s): First five-eighth Second five-eighth
Provincial / State sides
Years	Team	Apps	(Points)
1964–1971	Auckland	50	
International career
Years	Team	Apps	(Points)
1964–1965	New Zealand	5	(6)

Peter Henry Murdoch (17 June 1941 – 16 October 1995) was a New Zealand rugby union player. An inside back, Murdoch represented Auckland at a provincial level, and was a member of the New Zealand national side, the All Blacks, in 1964 and 1965. He played five games at first five-eighth for the All Blacks, all of them Test matches, scoring two tries.

Murdoch died on 16 October 1995 while jogging in Auckland Domain.
