= Kevin Briscoe =

New Zealand rugby union player

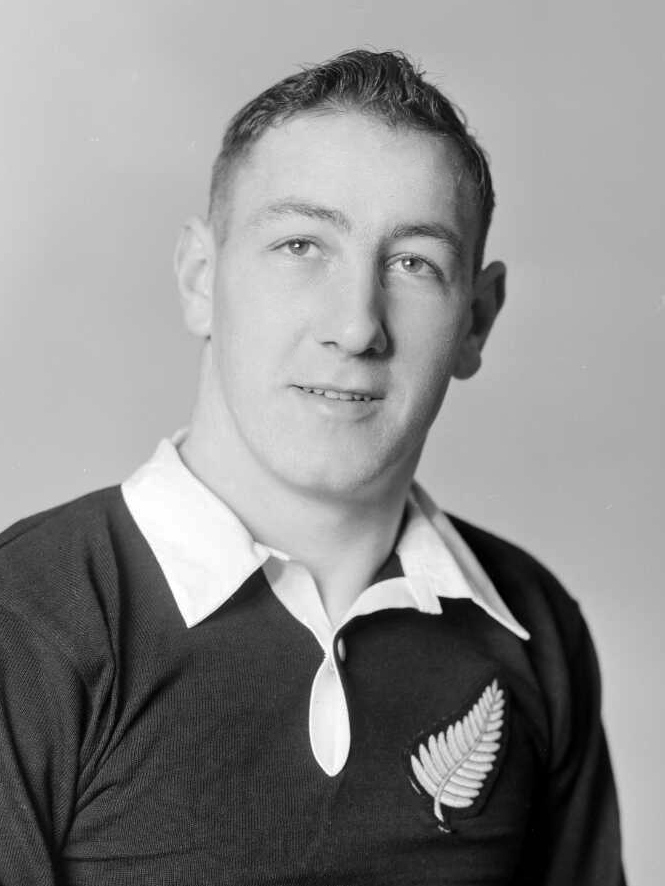
- Briscoe c. 1960
- Born: Kevin Charles Briscoe; 20 August 1936 New Plymouth, New Zealand
- Died: 1 April 2009 (aged 72) New Plymouth, New Zealand
- Height: 1.70 m (5 ft 7 in)
- Weight: 75 kg (165 lb)
- School: New Plymouth Boys' High School

Rugby union career
- Position: Halfback
Provincial / State sides
Years	Team	Apps	(Points)
1957–65	Taranaki	54	
International career
Years	Team	Apps	(Points)
1959–64	New Zealand	9	(0)

Kevin Charles Briscoe (20 August 1936 – 1 April 2009) was a New Zealand rugby union player. A halfback, Briscoe represented Taranaki at a provincial level, and was a member of the New Zealand national side, the All Blacks, from 1959 to 1964. He played 43 matches for the All Blacks—three of which were as captain—including nine internationals.
