= Mack Herewini =

New Zealand rugby union player

Mac Herewini
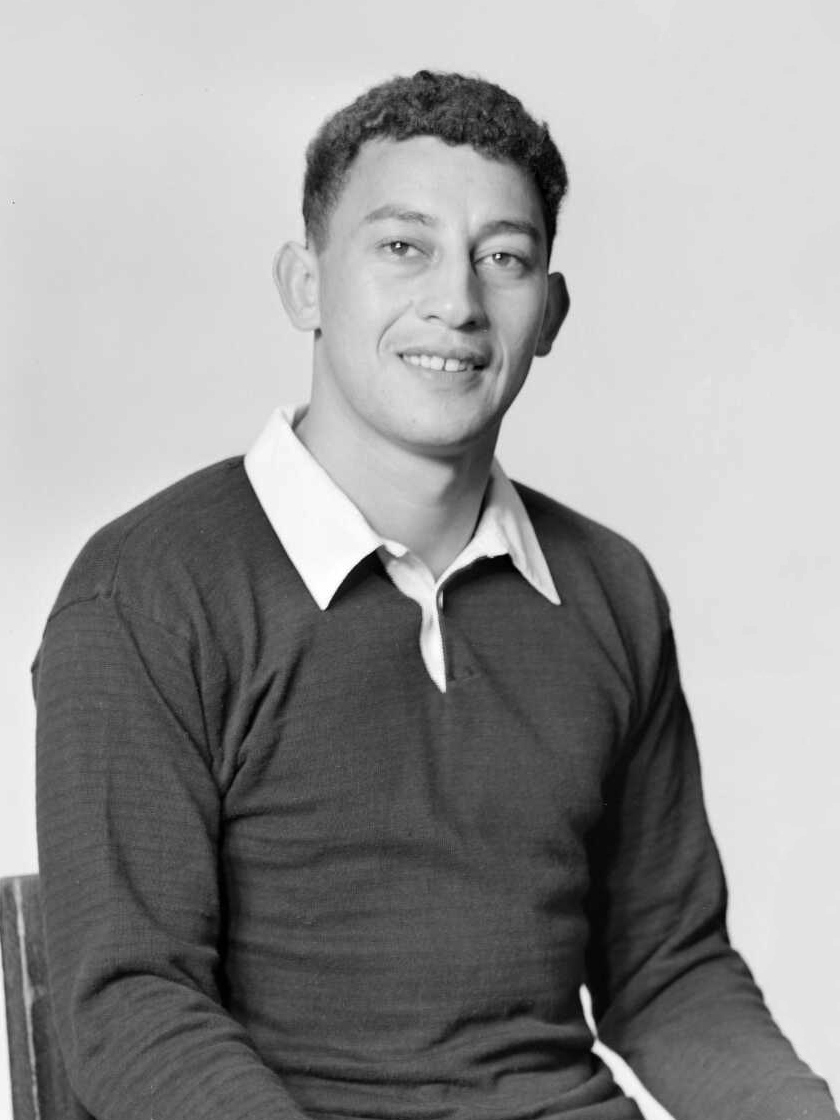
- Herewini c. 1961
- Born: McFarlane Alexander Herewini; 20 October 1939 Mokai, New Zealand
- Died: 21 May 2014 (aged 74) Ōtāhuhu, New Zealand
- Height: 1.68 m (5 ft 6 in)
- Weight: 73 kg (161 lb)
- School: Otahuhu College
- Occupation: Watersider

Rugby union career
- Position(s): First five-eighth Fullback
Provincial / State sides
Years	Team	Apps	(Points)
1958–70	Auckland		
International career
Years	Team	Apps	(Points)
1962–67	New Zealand	10	(21)
1960–71	New Zealand Māori		

McFarlane Alexander "Mac" Herewini (20 October 1939 – 21 May 2014) was a New Zealand rugby union player. A first five-eighth and fullback, Herewini represented Auckland at a provincial level, and was a member of the New Zealand national side, the All Blacks, from 1962 to 1967. In 1966, he played in all four tests against the touring British Lions. In all, he played 32 matches for the All Blacks including 10 internationals. He was part of the New Zealand team to tour Britain France and Canada in 1967 but lost his place in the test side to Earle Kirton. Some say that he was unsuited to the open running style of play favoured by All Blacks coach Fred Allen. However, Herewini continued to play for Auckland until 1970 and had New Zealand trials in 1968 and 1970. His last first class game was for New Zealand Māori against the 1971 British Lions.

Of Ngāti Tūwharetoa and Ngāti Kahungunu descent, Herewini played for New Zealand Māori from 1960 to 1971. He was a two-time recipient of the Tom French Cup for Māori rugby player of the year, in 1960 and 1963. Herewini died in 2014 and he was buried at Otahuhu Cemetery.

Awards
Preceded by Bill Wordley	Tom French Memorial; Māori rugby union player of the year 1960; 1963	Succeeded by Vic Yates
Preceded by Waka Nathan	Tom French Memorial; Māori rugby union player of the year 1960; 1963	Succeeded by Ron Rangi
