= Ian MacRae =

New Zealand rugby union player

Ian MacRae ONZM
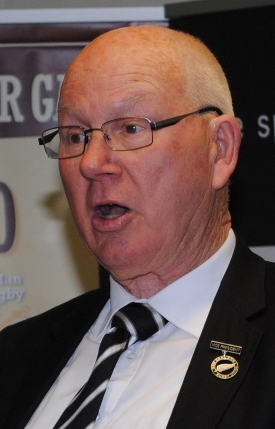
- MacRae in 2011
- Born: Ian Robert MacRae; 6 April 1943 (age 83) Christchurch, New Zealand
- Height: 1.88 m (6 ft 2 in)
- Weight: 86 kg (190 lb)
- School: Rangiora High School

Rugby union career
- Position: Second five-eighth and centre
Provincial / State sides
Years	Team	Apps	(Points)
1961	West Coast	10	
1962	Bay of Plenty	7	
1963–71	Hawke's Bay	85	
International career
Years	Team	Apps	(Points)
1963–70	New Zealand	17	(9)

Ian Robert MacRae ONZM (born 6 April 1943) is a former New Zealand rugby union player. A second five-eighth and centre, MacRae represented West Coast, Bay of Plenty and Hawke's Bay at a provincial level, and was a member of the New Zealand national side, the All Blacks, from 1963 to 1970. He played 28 matches for the All Blacks—three as captain—including 17 internationals.

McRae went on to be involved in rugby as a coach and administrator. He served on the Super 12 judiciary panel between 1996 and 1998, and was elected president of the New Zealand Rugby Union in 2013. He also served as president of the New Zealand Rugby Museum.

In the 2012 New Year Honours, MacRae was appointed an Officer of the New Zealand Order of Merit for services to rugby.
