= Bruce Watt =

New Zealand rugby union player (1939–2021)

- Born: Bruce Alexander Watt; 12 March 1939 Marton, New Zealand
- Died: 15 July 2021 (aged 82) Tawa, Wellington, New Zealand
- Height: 1.72 m (5 ft 8 in)
- Weight: 76 kg (168 lb)
- School: Wanganui Technical College

Rugby union career
- Position: First five-eighth
Provincial / State sides
Years	Team	Apps	(Points)
1957–58	Wanganui		
1959–68	Canterbury	117	
International career
Years	Team	Apps	(Points)
1959	New Zealand Juniors	1	
1962–64	New Zealand	8	(9)

Bruce Alexander Watt (12 March 1939 – 15 July 2021) was a New Zealand rugby union player. A first five-eighth, Watt represented Wanganui and Canterbury at a provincial level, and was a member of the New Zealand national side, the All Blacks, from 1962 to 1964. He played 29 matches for the All Blacks including eight internationals. He later coached extensively among regional junior teams. He was also a cricketer who played Hawke Cup cricket for Rangitikei.

Watt died in Tawa on 15 July 2021.
