= Otahuhu College =

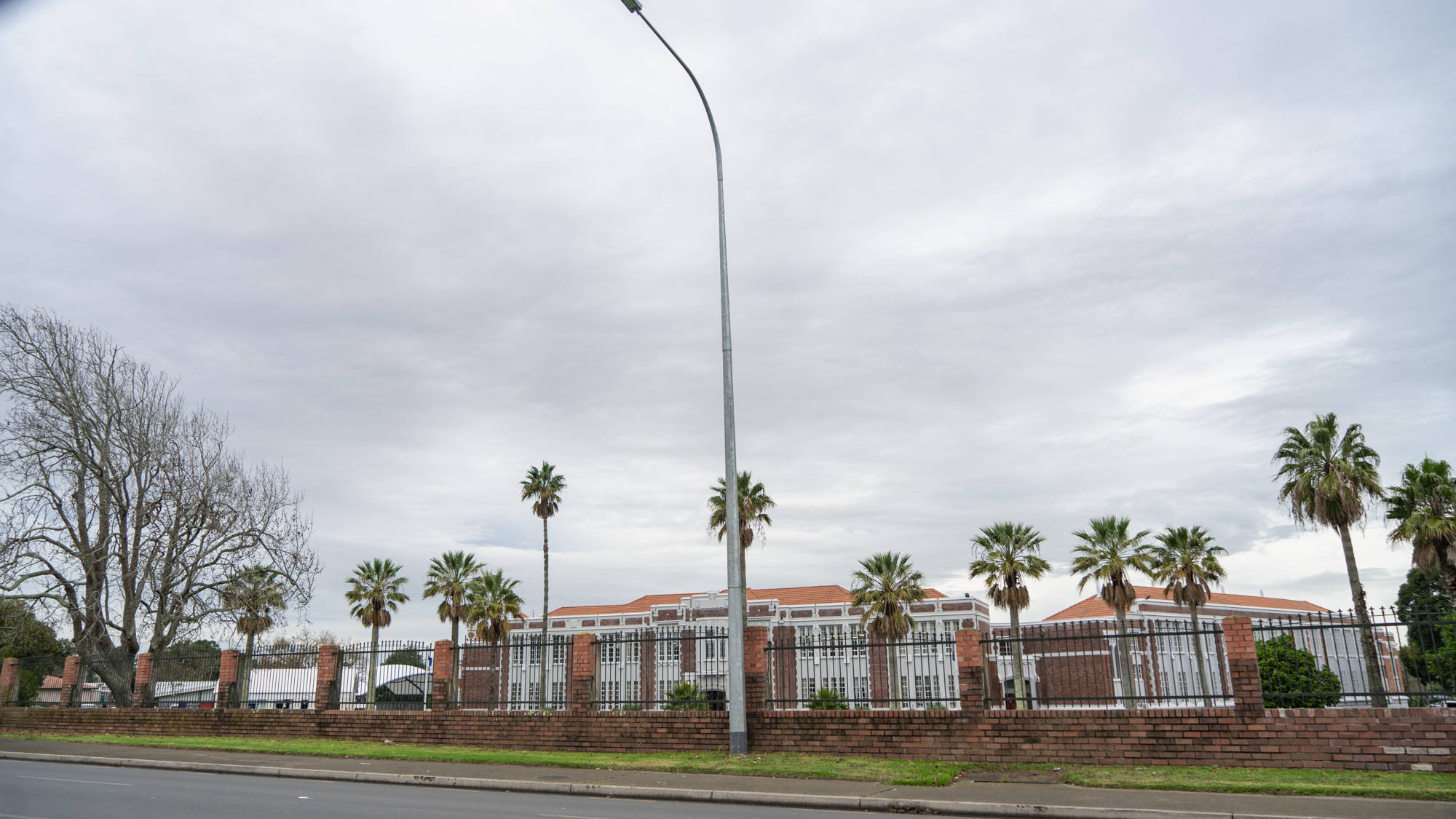

Location
- Mangere Road; Ōtāhuhu; Auckland 1062; New Zealand; 36.9531°S 174.8404°E

Information
- Type: State Co-Ed Secondary (Year 9–13)
- Motto: Kia Tamatane
- Established: 1931
- Ministry of Education Institution no.: 88
- Principal: Neil Watson
- Enrolment: 1,151 (July 2026)
- Socio-economic decile: 1B
- Website: otahuhucollege.school.nz

Otahuhu College is a secondary school in Auckland, New Zealand, for students years 9 to 13.

== Location ==
It is located in the suburb of Ōtāhuhu and is a co-educational school. The main campus entrance is on Mangere Road, the Memorial Field sports complex is at a separate venue also on Mangere Road. In 2021 the school celebrated its 90th year, having opened in 1931. In 1931 the school was called Otahuhu Junior High School. In 1933 courses were extended to include senior levels of study and school was called Otahuhu Technical High School. In 1947 the school became Otahuhu College.

== Enrolment ==
As of July 2026, Otahuhu College has a roll of 1,151 students, of which 166 (14.4%) identify as Māori.

As of 2026, the school has an Equity Index of 509, placing it amongst schools whose students have many socioeconomic barriers to achievement (roughly equivalent to deciles 2 and 3 under the former socio-economic decile system).

== Structure ==
Otahuhu College is divided into four houses:

Otahuhu College's House Names & their Colours
Seddon	Named for New Zealand Prime Minister Richard Seddon.
Massey	Named for New Zealand Prime Minister William Massey
Hobson	Named for New Zealand Governor William Hobson
Grey	Named for New Zealand Governor Sir George Grey

Each house is controlled by a House Leader, and each house has a Head Boy, Head Girl and a Deputy Head Girl and Deputy Head Boy.

At the end of 2006 Otahuhu College A-Block building was earthquake strengthened. The Sturges Field sports facilities were refurbished after 2007. In 2016 the Science Block was opened.

== Notable alumni ==
=== Academia ===
- Ron Crocombe, Emeritus Professor at the University of the South Pacific

=== Public service ===
- Sir James Belich (1927–2015), former mayor of Wellington
- Sir Barry Curtis, longest-serving mayor in New Zealand
- Rt Hon. David Lange, former prime minister of New Zealand
- Shaneel Lal, former Youth MP and founder of End Conversion Therapy New Zealand

=== Sports ===
- Orene Ai'i, rugby union player
- Olsen Filipaina, rugby league player
- Tea Ropati, rugby league player
- Iva Ropati, rugby league player
- Vila Matautia, rugby league player
- Graham Gedye, cricketer
- Mark Hunt, mixed martial arts fighter
- Ali Lauiti'iti, rugby league player
- Brett Leaver, field hockey player
- Tupou Neiufi, paralympian swimmer
- David Tua, boxer
- Setu Tu, rugby league player
- Roger Tuivasa-Sheck, rugby league player
- Cooper Vuna, rugby league and rugby union player
- Waka Nathan, rugby union player
- Sio Siua Taukeiaho, rugby league player
