= Kel Tremain =

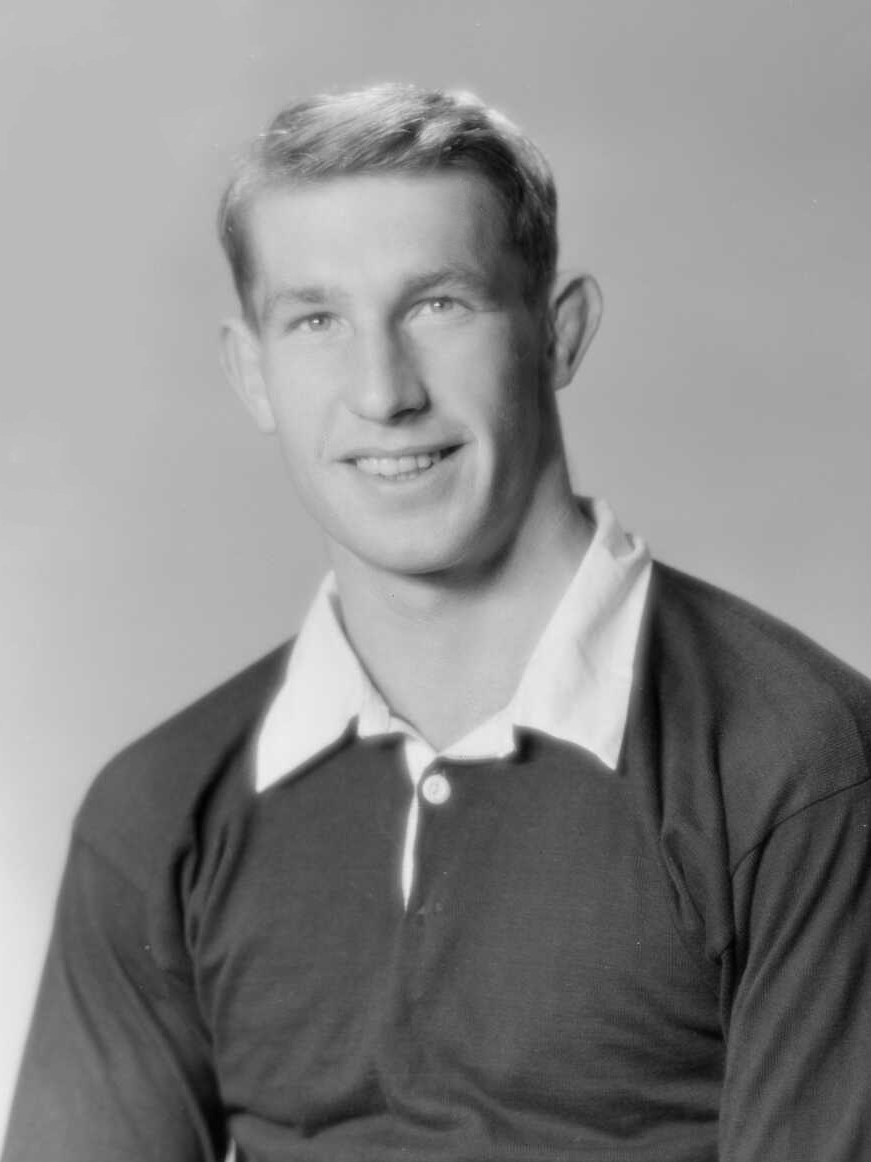
- Born: Kelvin Robin Tremain; 21 February 1938 Auckland, New Zealand
- Died: 2 May 1992 (aged 54) Napier, New Zealand
- Height: 1.88 m (6 ft 2 in)
- Weight: 100 kg (220 lb)
- School: Auckland Grammar School
- University: Massey Agricultural College; Canterbury Agricultural College
- Notable relative: Chris Tremain (son)

Rugby union career
- Position: Flanker
Provincial / State sides
Years	Team	Apps	(Points)
1957	Southland	10	
1958	Manawatu	6	
1959, 1961	Canterbury	14	
1960	Auckland	3	
1962–70	Hawke's Bay	96	
International career
Years	Team	Apps	(Points)
1959–68	New Zealand	38	(27)

Kelvin Robin Tremain (21 February 1938 – 2 May 1992) was a New Zealand rugby union player and administrator. A flanker, he won 38 full caps for the New Zealand national team, the All Blacks, between 1959 and 1968, scoring nine tries. During the 1960s he had a status in New Zealand rugby comparable to that of his teammate, Colin Meads.

== Biography ==
Born in Auckland on 21 February 1938, Tremain was educated at Auckland Grammar School, where he played in the 1st XV rugby team in 1954 and 1955. After leaving school, he became an agricultural field cadet, which took him all over the country, including stints studying at Massey and Canterbury Agricultural Colleges. As a result, he played for five different provincial teams: Southland, Manawatu, Canterbury, Auckland, and Hawke's Bay. It was with the latter team that he made the greatest contribution, appearing in 96 games between 1962 and 1970, and becoming team captain.

Tremain made two appearances for the South Island and seven for the North Island in interisland matches, and was captain of the New Zealand Universities side that toured North America in 1961.

He made his All Blacks debut in 1959, playing in three tests against the touring British and Irish Lions. After touring with the New Zealand team to Australia and South Africa in 1960, Tremain was generally regarded as an automatic selection for the team, and he gained a status alongside his contemporary, Colin Meads, as one of the greats of New Zealand rugby. He continued playing for New Zealand until 1968, captaining the side in three matches in his final year. He was controversially omitted from the team in 1969. In all, Tremain played 86 matches for the All Blacks—38 of them full internationals—and scored 108 points (36 tries), including nine Test tries.

A prolific scorer, Tremain scored 136 tries in his 268 first-class appearances.

After retiring as a player, Tremain served the game as an administrator. He was chairman of the Hawke's Bay Rugby Union between 1985 and 1990 and a member of the New Zealand Rugby Union council from 1990.

Tremain died in Napier on 2 May 1992. His sons include Chris Tremain, who served as the Member of Parliament for Napier between 2005 and 2014, and Simon Tremain, who represented Otago, Wellington and Hawke's Bay in rugby union.

== Legacy ==
Tremain has been inducted into the New Zealand Sports Hall of Fame. The Kelvin Tremain Memorial Trophy, named in his memory, is awarded annually to New Zealand's outstanding rugby player of the year.

In 1986, Tremain and Russell Pettigrew founded the New Zealand Rugby Foundation, which assists seriously injured rugby players.
