= Taranaki Rugby Football Union =

Rugby union governing body in Taranaki, New Zealand

Taranaki Rugby
- Sport: Rugby union
- Jurisdiction: Taranaki Region
- Abbreviation: TRFU
- Founded: 1885; 141 years ago
- Affiliation: New Zealand Rugby
- Headquarters: New Plymouth
- CEO: Jimmy Fastier
- Men's coach: Neil Barnes
- Women's coach: Ben Siffleet

Official website
- www.trfu.co.nz
- (New Zealand)

The Taranaki Rugby Football Union (TRFU, Taranaki Rugby) is the governing body for rugby union in Taranaki, New Zealand. Established in 1885, it is based in New Plymouth. The union's traditional colours are amber and black.

The Taranaki Bulls and Taranaki Whio are the two most senior representative men's and women's teams, competing in the NPC and Farah Palmer Cup respectively. The Bulls typically play their home games at Stadium Taranaki in New Plymouth, while the Whio play at Stadium Taranaki and other venues across the province.

Taranaki Rugby is part of the Chiefs Super Rugby region and has a 23.1% ownership stake in the franchise.

== History ==
=== Early years ===
Taranaki was officially established in 1889 after a team chosen from the surrounding clubs in existence played as Egmont in 1885. They began with a brown coloured jersey before adopting the amber and black hoops in 1892. During the amateur period, the team won the Ranfurly Shield on four occasions. It had also won seven-second division titles in the National Provincial Championship, more than any other team. Further notable moments were in 1959, when a record 35,000 spectators attended Rugby Park in New Plymouth to see the province play the British Lions. Two years later 36,000 people were on hand to watch France defeat the side 11-9. Their first Ranfurly Shield victory came in 1913 when Auckland was defeated 14-11. Six successful defences followed before a 12-6 loss to Wellington in September 1914. In 1957 shield holders Wellington was defeated in a friendly match early in the year and a rematch was scheduled for later in the season. Otago defeated Wellington, and Otago accepted a special challenge by Taranaki. The match was played on 28 September 1957, the last Saturday of the season, after King Country gave up its scheduled fixture with Taranaki. Taranaki won against Otago for them to, later on, go a 13-match tenure.

In 1963 Taranaki regained the Ranfurly Shield once again off Wellington with a win at Athletic Park. Their third tenure would be its most successful one. The first challenge came from Wanganui who were making their second challenge of the season, having lost earlier to Auckland. Wanganui later would suffer a further defeat in 1964. Taranaki lost to Auckland in their last defence in 1965 and would not reclaim the shield again until 1996 when they edged Auckland 42-39. North Harbour lost narrowly in a tight contest before Taranaki was beaten by 20 points against Waikato.

=== Professional era ===
In August 2011 Taranaki defeated Southland 15-12 in Invercargill to begin a fifth tenure of the shield. This ended in October 2012 when Waikato won the last challenge of the season. In 2013 Taranaki RFU assembled a women's professional team although it was later disbanded the following year. They claimed the national title for the first time in their history with a win over Tasman in the 2014 ITM Cup. and Hawke's Bay in the 2023 competition.

== Club rugby ==
The following rugby clubs are or have been affiliated with the Taranaki RFU.

Club	Founded	McMaster's Shield premiership wins	All Blacks	Current status. Mergers
Athletic RFC. Known as "the Bolshies"	1925		Maurice Cockerill (1951)	No longer exists. Merged with Hawera RC and Waimate RFC into Southern Rugby Club in 1994
Bell Block Rugby Sports and Community Club				Current
Central Rugby and Sports Club
Clifton Rugby & Sports Club	1880	1890, 1891, 1923, 1972, 1973, 1974, 1976, 1980, 1984, 1992, 1999, 2026		Current
Coastal Rugby & Sports Club	1995	2009, 2012	Mark Robinson (2000-02), Beauden Barrett (2012-), Scott Barrett (2016-), Jordie Barrett (2017-),	Current. Formed through the merger of the Okato RFC, Rahotu RFC and Opunake RFC.
Eltham Rugby Football Club	1888	1945, 1949, 1950, 1953, 1954, 1956, 1958, 1987, 1990, 1991	Frank Glasgow (1903–05), Roger Urbahn (1959–60), Brian Muller (1967–71), Bryce Robins (1985).	No longer exists. Merged with Stratford 2017
Hawera RFC	1876 (Hawera-Waihi until 1879)	1900, 1905, 1915, 1916, 1919, 1920, 1921, 1924, 1982		No longer exists. Merged with Athletic RFC and Waimate RFC into Southern Rugby Club in 1994
Inglewood United Rugby Netball Football Club	1893 (as Athletic), 1898 United	1940, 1960, 1970, 1978, 1979, 1981, 1983, 1985, 1986, 1987, 1988, 1989, 2006, 2014, 2021	John Major 1963, Dave Loveridge 1978-85	Rugby in Inglewood began in 1893 when Inglewood’s first rugby club, the Athletic Club, was formed. Shortly after, in 1896, the Pirates Club was formed. These two clubs united to form one club in 1898
Kaitake Rugby Football Club, Corbett Park, Oakura	1894		Hugh Mills & Barney O'Dowda played for Kaitake, later making the All Blacks from Tukapa in 1897 and 1901 respectively	Current. Fields junior grade teams. Was it recess 1941-51 and 1962-68/
Kaponga Rugby Football Club	1907		Ian Eliason 1972-73, Kieran Crowley 1984-91	Current
New Plymouth HSOB Rugby Football and Sports Club	1919	1930, 1946, 1957, 1993, 1994, 1995, 1996, 1997, 1998, 2000, 2002, 2003, 2004, 2007, 2008, 2015, 2018, 2023	H.W. Brown 1924-26, R.A. Roper 1949-50, George Beatty (1950), N.J. Bowden, 1952, R.H. Brown, 1955–62, R.J. Boon, 1960, John McEldowney 1976–77, Murray Watts, 1979–80, Gordon Slater 1997-2000, Te Toiroa Tahuriorangi 2018, Tupou Vaa'i 2020	Current
Okaiawa Rugby Football Club	1896	1911, 1932, 1938,	Jimmie O'Sullivan 1905, Dick Roberts 1913, Davy Johnston 1925, Ray Clarke 1932	Current
Okato Rugby Football Club	1894, initially the Diamond (Okatu) club until around 1900	1952, 1975, 1977	Terry O'Sullivan (1960-62)	No longer exists. Merged into Coastal Rugby & Sports Club in 1995
Opunake RFC	1896	1929,	Bill Currey	No longer exists. Merged into Coastal Rugby & Sports Club in 1995
Patea Rugby and Sports Club:	3/6/1876 (as Carlyle), the oldest club in Taranaki	1934, 1951,	Murray Wills (1967), Alistair Scown (1972)	Current
Pihama / Auroa-Pihama	1888			No longer exists. Went into recess but revived in 1941 as part of a Coastal competition. Club ceased in 1955.
Rahotu Community And Sports Club	1919			No longer exists. Earlier club, Ake Ake, existed in Rahotu area but went into recess before World War I. Rahotu club formed Merged into Coastal Rugby & Sports Club in 1995
Southern Rugby Football Club	1994	2013	Jarrad Hoeata 2011	Current. Merger of the Hawera RFC, the Athletic RFC and the Waimate RFC (Manaia).
Spotswood College Old Boys RFC	1964			No longer exists. Merged in 1990 with Star RFC to form Spotswood United Rugby Football and Sports Club
Star RFC	1889	1892, 1903, 1947, 1948	Lewis (Snip) Allen (1896-1901), Arthur Humphries (1897-1903), Bunny Abbott (1905-06), Neil Wolfe (1961-1968)	No longer exists. Merged in 1990 with Spotswood College Old Boys to form Spotswood United Rugby Football and Sports Club
Stratford RFC	1889	1906, 1907, 1925, 1927, 1928, 1931, 1935, 1937, 1959, 1961, 1962, 1963, 1964, 1965, 1967, 1971		No longer exists. Merged with Eltham 2017
Stratford Eltham Rugby & Sports Club	2016	2024 2025		Current. Merger of Stratford RFC and Eltham RFC.
Toko Rugby Football Club	1905			Current. The club was in recess for some years until 1977.
Tukapa Rugby and Sports Club	1892	1897, 1902, 1904, 1922, 1926, 1936, 1939, 1966, 1968, 1969, 2001, 2005, 2010, 2011, 2016, 2017, 2020, 2022		Current
United Rugby Football & Sports Club (formerly Spotswood United)	1991	2019		Current. Merger of the Star RFC and the Spotswood Old Boys RFC.
Waimate RFC, Manaia	1884	1893, 1894, 1895, 1908, 1909, 1910, 1912, 1913, 1914, 1933, 1955,		No longer exists. Merged with Athletic RFC and Hawera RFC into Southern Rugby Club in 1994
Whangamoana Rugby Football Club	1903

=== Recent club finals ===
McMaster Shield

- 2026 - Clifton 40-24 Coastal
- 2025 - Stratford-Eltham 31-22 Coastal
- 2024 - Stratford-Eltham 36-24 Southern
- 2023 - New Plymouth Old Boys 26-12 Stratford Eltham (in extra time, 12-12 after 80 minutes)
- 2022 - Tukapa 22-21 Clifton

=== Premier women's club rugby ===
- 2026 - Southern 26-12 Stratford-Eltham
- 2025 - Inglewood 46-24 Tukapa

== Schools rugby ==
Rugby is played at the following schools.

- Francis Douglas Memorial College
- Hawera High School
- Inglewood High School
- New Plymouth Boys' High School
- New Plymouth Girls' High School
- Opunake High School
- Sacred Heart Girls' College
- Spotswood College
- Stratford High School
- Taranaki Diocesan School for Girls
- Waitara High School

== Taranaki provincial team ==
Year	Pos.	Division	GP	W	L	D	PTS	Captain	Head coach
2006	11th	N/A	9	3	6	0	16	Paul Tito	Kieran Crowley
2007	8th	N/A	11	4	7	0	23	Tony Penn	Kieran Crowley
2008	8th	N/A	11	4	6	1	23	Tony Penn	Adrian Kennedy
2009	8th	N/A	13	6	6	1	28	Tony Penn	Adrian Kennedy
2010	5th	N/A	13	9	4	0	42	Craig Clarke	Colin Cooper
2011 (Note: Taranaki won the Ranfurly Shield in 2011. It was their fifth tenure and defended it seven times.)	3rd	Premiership	10	7	3	0	31	Craig Clarke	Colin Cooper
2012	4th	Premiership	11	7	4	0	33	Craig Clarke	Colin Cooper
2013	6th	Premiership	10	3	7	0	14	Kane Barrett	Colin Cooper
2014 (Note: Taranaki won the ITM Cup Premiership in 2014. It was their first time winning a first division title.)	1st	Premiership	12	9	2	1	38	James Marshall	Colin Cooper
2015	4th	Premiership	11	6	5	0	32	Charlie Ngatai	Colin Cooper
2016	2nd	Premiership	11	7	3	1	37	Mitchell Crosswell	Colin Cooper
2017 (Note: Taranaki won the Ranfurly Shield in 2017. It was their sixth tenure and defended it five times.)	1st	Premiership	11	8	3	0	42	Charlie Ngatai	Colin Cooper
2018	7th	Premiership	10	2	8	0	13	Mitchell Crosswell	Willie Rickards
2019	5th	Championship	10	4	6	0	18	Mitchell Brown	Willie Rickards
2020 (Note: Taranaki won the Ranfurly Shield in 2020. It was their seventh tenure but failed to defend it.)	4th	Championship	11	4	7	0	24	Mitchell Brown	Willie Rickards
2021 (Note: Taranaki won the Bunnings NPC Championship Division in 2021, however weren't promoted.)	1st	Championship	10	10	0	0	39	Mitchell Brown & Teihorangi Walden	Neil Barnes
2022	6th	Evens Conference	10	3	0	7	15	Mitchell Brown & Teihorangi Walden	Neil Barnes
2023	2nd	N/A	10	7	0	3	38	Kaylum Boshier	Neil Barnes
2024	2nd	N/A	10	8	0	2	40	Kaylum Boshier	Neil Barnes
2025	5th	N/A	10	6	0	4	32	Kaylum Boshier	Neil Barnes
Source: New Zealand Rugby History

== Notable players ==
=== All Blacks ===
Taranaki has produced 83 men's New Zealand internationals to date. Below is a list of New Zealand national rugby union players along with their number and year of debut in brackets.

- Alfred Bayly (35 - 1893)
- Alan Good (42 - 1893)
- James Lambie (27 - 1893)
- Walter Bayly (48 - 1894)
- Hugh Good (50 - 1894)
- Daniel Hughes (51 - 1894)
- Lewis Allen (56 - 1896)
- Donald Watson (65 - 1896)
- Arthur Humphries (73 - 1897)
- Bill Wells (75 - 1897)
- Hugh Mills (80 - 1897)
- Bernard O'Dowda (88 - 1901)
- Billy Glenn (111 - 1904)
- Frank Glasgow (117 - 1905)
- Jimmy Hunter (118 - 1905)
- Simon Mynott (120 - 1905)
- Jimmie O'Sullivan (122 - 1905)
- Harold Abbott (130 - 1905)
- Jack Colman (142 - 1907)
- Donald Cameron (150 - 1908)
- Jack Stohr (165 - 1910)
- Henry Dewar (175 - 1913)
- Mick Cain (187 - 1913)
- Charles Brown (192 - 1913)
- Reg Taylor (202 - 1913)
- George Loveridge (206 - 1913)
- Edward Roberts (207 - 1913)
- Alfred West (225 - 1920)
- Richard Fogarty (230 - 1921)
- Charles Kingstone (231 - 1921)
- Harold Masters (254 - 1922)
- Percy Hickey (264 - 1922)
- Handley Brown (290 - 1924)
- Gus Hart (293 - 1924)
- Davy Johnston (318 - 1925)
- Jack Walter (312 - 1925)
- Pat Ward (335 - 1928)
- Alfred Kivell (375 - 1929)
- Ray Clarke (390 - 1932)
- Arthur Collins (391 - 1932)
- Jack Sullivan (428 - 1936)
- Roy Roper (515 - 1949)
- George Beatty (517 - 1950)
- Maurice Cockerill (522 - 1951)
- Peter Burke (534 - 1951)
- Noel Bowden (544 - 1952)
- Ross Brown (572 - 1955)
- Roger Urbahn (598 - 1959)
- Kevin Briscoe (599 - 1959)
- John McCullough (603 - 1959)
- Terry O'Sullivan (612 - 1960)
- Roger Boon (616 - 1960)
- Neil Wolfe (620 - 1961)
- John Major (643 - 1963)
- Brian Muller (656 - 1967)
- Murray Wills (661 - 1967)
- Alan Smith (667 - 1967)
- Bill Currey (671 - 1968)
- Ian Eliason (706 - 1972)
- Alistair Scown (710 - 1972)
- Ash Gardiner (728 - 1974)
- Graham Mourie (757 - 1976)
- John McEldowney (768 - 1976)
- Dave Loveridge (791 - 1978)
- Murray Watts (793 - 1979)
- Kieran Crowley (848 - 1983)
- Bryce Robins (863 - 1985)
- Bull Allen (933 - 1993)
- Gordon Slater (968 - 1997)
- Andrew Hore (1019 - 2002)
- Chris Masoe (1059 - 2005)
- Jason Eaton (1063 - 2005)
- Scott Waldrom (1085 - 2008)
- Jarrad Hoeata (1109 - 2011)
- Beauden Barrett (1115 - 2012)
- Charlie Ngatai (1141 - 2015)
- Waisake Naholo (1142 - 2015)
- James Broadhurst (1144 - 2015)
- Seta Tamanivalu (1148 - 2016)
- Scott Barrett (1155 - 2016)
- Jordie Barrett (1159 - 2017)
- Te Toiroa Tahuriorangi (1174 - 2018)
- Angus Ta'avao (1175 - 2018)
- Tupou Vaa'i (1188 - 2020)
- Pita Gus Sowakula (1201 - 2022)

=== List of centurions ===
Pos.	Name	Year	Primary position	Games played
1	Kieran Crowley	1980–1994	Fullback	199
2	Ian Eliason	1964–1981	Lock	222
3	Andrew Slater	1989–2001	Lock	183
4	Gordon Slater	1991–2005	Prop	174
5	Kevin Barrett	1986–1999	Lock	167
6	Bryce Robins	1980–1992	Wing	147
7	Dave Loveridge	1975–1986	Half-back	123
7	Murray Watts	1978–1985	Wing	123
9	Tony Penn	1999–2009	Prop	117
10	Shane McDonald	1991–2000	Hooker	116
11	Bull Allen	1988–1996	Prop	110
12	Warren Bunn	1979–1989	Prop	109
13	Dwight Murfitt	1984–1993	Wing	106
14	Graham Mourie	1975–1982	Flanker	104
14	Felix O'Carroll	1975–1983	Hooker	104
14	Lindsay Thomson	1983–1991	Lock	104
17	Ross Elmes	1980–1989	Prop	103
17	Kerry Eynon	1991–2000	Centre	103
19	Ian Eliason	1975–1981	Lock	102
20	Colin Cooper	1979–1987	Number 8	100
20	Paul Tito	1997–2006	Lock	100
The table above shows the Taranaki RFU men's centurions from 1975. Source: New Zealand Rugby History; Updated: 11 September 2020

=== List of top try-scorers ===
Pos.	Name	Year	Primary position	Tries scored
1	Kieran Crowley	1980–1994	Fullback	64
2	Bryce Robins	1980–1992	Wing	59
3	Murray Watts	1978–1985	Wing	57
4	Shayne Austin	1998–2009	Wing	48
5	Charlie McAlister	1983–1987	Wing	36
6	Dwight Murfitt	1984–1993	Wing	33
7	Tony Arnold	1983–1987	Wing	32
8	Bull Allen	1988–1996	Prop	28
9	Andre Taylor	2010–2013	Fullback	27
10	Seta Tamanivalu	2012–2018	Centre	26
The table above shows the Taranaki RFU men's top 10 try-scorers from 1975. Source: New Zealand Rugby History; Updated: 11 September 2020

=== List of top point-scorers ===
Pos.	Name	Year	Primary position	Points scored
1	Kieran Crowley	1980–1994	Fullback	1,723
2	Daryl Lilley	1993–2003	Fullback	777
3	Jamie Cameron	1992–1999	First five-eighth	614
4	Stephen Davidson	1975–1982	Fullback	588
5	Marty McKenzie	2014–2017	First five-eighth	392
6	Mark Urwin	1997–2003	First five-eighth	361
7	Willie Ripia	2008–2010	First five-eighth	317
8	Jason Holland	1997–1998	First five-eighth	259
9	Bryce Robins	1980–1992	Wing	258
10	Kelvin Mahon	1985–1993	Fullback	247
The table above shows the Taranaki RFU men's top 10 point-scorers from 1975. Source: New Zealand Rugby History; Updated: 11 September 2020

== Referees ==
The Taranaki Rugby Referees' Association is also an affiliated member of the Taranaki RFU. The organisation provides match officials for senior club rugby down to junior grades. They also provide sideline support personnel to home National Provincial Championship, Super Rugby and test matches.

Taranaki has a proud history of producing top level referees. Brian Duffy was the region's first test match referee and controlled six internationals, including one test between the British and Irish Lions and All Blacks in 1977. Paul Williams followed with his test debut coming in 2017.

Former sevens international Warwick Lahmert, Will Johnston and Chloe Sampson are in the National Panel and take charge of domestic competition matches. Richard Kelly featured in the panel for 12 years, including a successful sevens career, where he was the world's most capped sevens referee when he retired in March 2021. He controlled 280 matches over 52 tournaments, including the Gold Coast Commonwealth Games in 2018, 2018 World Rugby 7s World Cup and 2016 Rio Olympics, in which he refereed one semi-final. He is now an international television match official.

Other Taranaki referees have been involved in the national scene in the past, these are; Cam Stone, Dee Luckin, Darryl Heibner, Chris Pollock, Brian MacDonald, Paul Macfie, Stuart Beissell, Ross Whitmore, Paul Honiss, Russell Hodge and Murray Dombroski.
