= 1897 New Zealand rugby union tour of Australia =

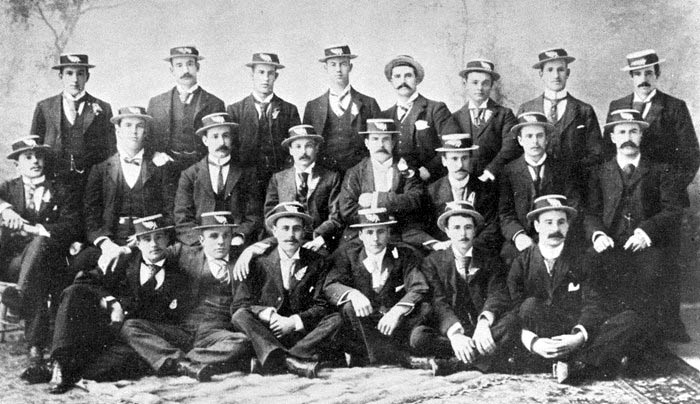
- The team that toured to Australia
- Manager: I. Hyams
- Tour captain: A. Bayly
- Top point scorer: Arthur Humphries (42)
- Top try scorer: George W. Smith (11)
Summary
P	W	D	L
Total
10	9	0	1

Tour chronology
- ← 1893 Australia 1903 Australia →

The 1897 New Zealand tour rugby to Australia was the third tour by the New Zealand national team to Australia. Ten matches were played against regional and district sides. This tour saw the first known instances in any football code anywhere in the world of jerseys or shirts with player numbers used on the back. Jersey numbers for both teams were used in at least Matches 1 and 6 (see list below) of the tour.

== Touring party ==
- Manager: I. Hyams
- Captain: Alfred Bayly

Name	Position	Province
Lewis Allen	Back	Taranaki
Barney Armit	Back	Otago
Alfred Bayly	Back	Taranaki
William Roberts	Back	Wellington
George Smith	Back	Auckland
Jimmy Duncan	Back	Otago
Ernest Glennie	Back	Canterbury
Arthur Humphries	Back	Taranaki
John Blair	Forward	Wanganui
Frank Brooker	Forward	Canterbury
Joseph Calnan	Forward	Wellington
Robert Handcock	Forward	Auckland
Bill Hardcastle	Forward	Wellington
William Harris	Forward	Otago
William McKenzie	Forward	Wellington
Hugh Mills	Forward	Taranaki
Thomas Pauling	Forward	Wellington
Frederick Murray	Forward	Auckland
Sydney Orchard	Back	Canterbury
William Wells	Forward	Taranaki
Alex Wilson	Forward	Auckland

== Match summary ==
Complete list of matches played by New Zealand in Australia:

#	Date	Rival	City	Venue	Score
1	3 Jul	NSW Waratahs	Sydney	Cricket Ground	13–8
2	6 Jul	Western Districts	Bathurst		16–15
3	8 Jul	Central–Western Districts	Orange	Showground	27–3
4	10 Jul	NSW Waratahs	Sydney	Cricket Ground	8–22
5	14 Jul	Northern NSW	Newcastle	Sports Ground	16–0
6	17 Jul	Queensland Reds	Brisbane		16–5
7	21 Jul	Queensland Reds	Brisbane	Union Ground	29–5
8	24 Jul	Queensland Reds	Brisbane	Exhibition Ground	24–6
9	27 Jul	New England	Armidale	Showground	53–5
10	31 Jul	NSW Waratahs	Sydney	Cricket Ground	26–3

Balance
Pl	W	D	L	Ps	Pc
10	9	0	1	228	72
