= 1893 New Zealand rugby union tour of Australia =

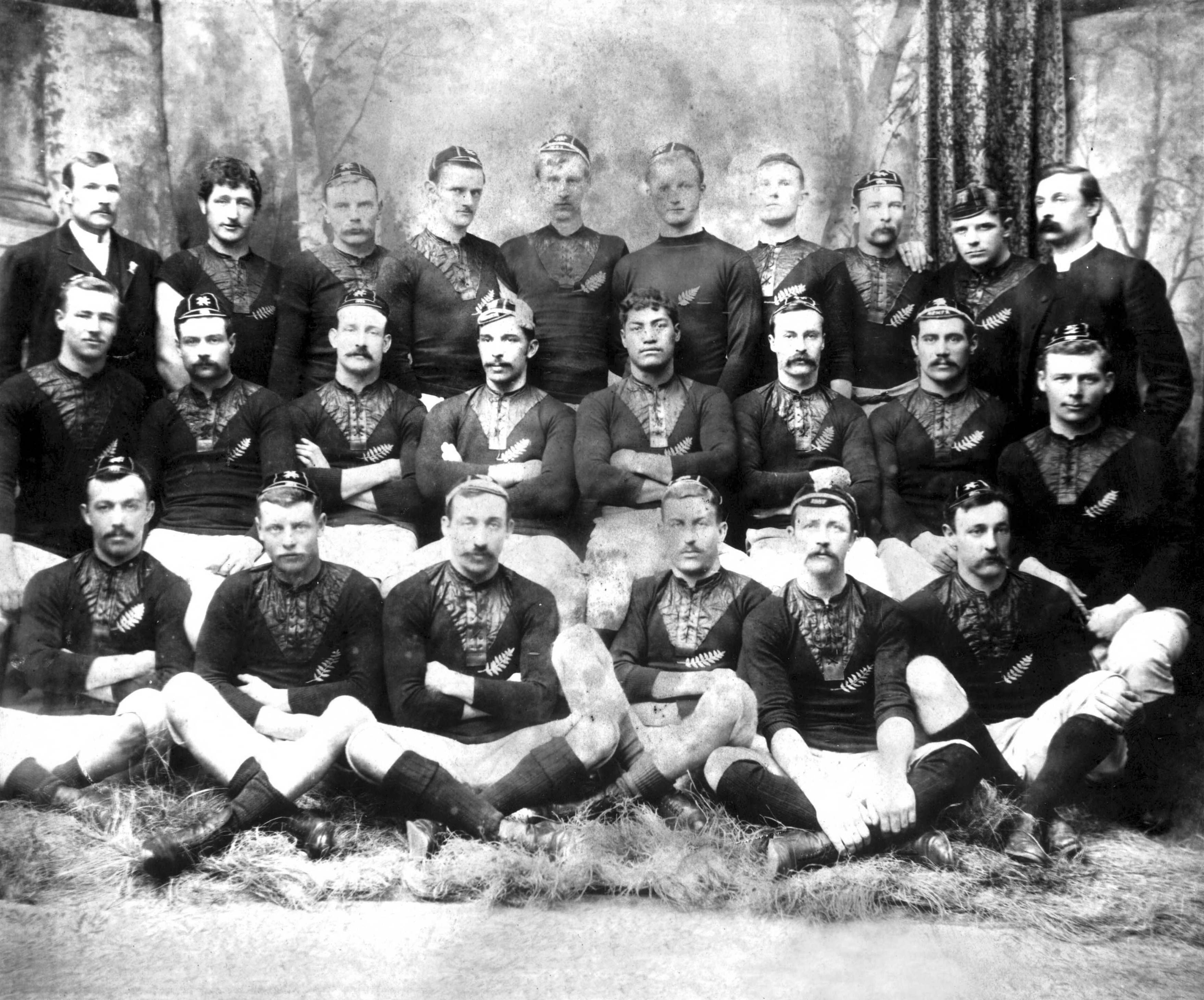
- The New Zealand team that toured Australia
- Manager: G.F.C. Campbell
- Tour captain: Thomas Ellison
- Top point scorer: Francis Jervis (38)
- Top try scorer(s): Francis Jervis (6); Thomas Ellison (6)
Summary
P	W	D	L
Total
10	9	0	1

Tour chronology
- ← 1884 New South Wales 1897 Australia →

The 1893 New Zealand tour rugby to Australia was the second tour by the New Zealand national rugby union team to Australia. Ten matches were played against regional and district sides, but no Test matches were played. It was the first tour arranged by New Zealand Rugby Football Union, which had been founded the previous year. The only previous New Zealand national team was the side that toured New South Wales in 1884. Immediately before departing for Sydney, the tourists played a match against a "Combined XV" in Wellington, which New Zealand won 7–4.

== Touring party ==
- Manager: G.F.C. Campbell
- Captain: Thomas Ellison

Name	Position	Province
Archie D'Arcy	Fullback	Wairarapa
Henry Clarke Wilson	Fullback	Wellington
Alan Good	Wing	Taranaki
George Harper	Three-quarter	Nelson
Francis "Doss" Mahon Jervis	Wing	Auckland
William "Tabby" Wynyard	Three-quarter	Wellington
Henry Butland	Half back	West Coast
David Gage	Utility back	Wellington
Maurice Herrold	Half back	Auckland
Graham Shannon	Half back/Forward	Manawatu
Alfred Bayly	Loose forward	Taranaki
Sam Cockroft	Hooker	Manawatu
Thomas Ellison	Forward	Wellington
John Henry Gardner	Forward	South Canterbury
Rod Gray	Forward	Wairarapa
James Taylor Lambie	Forward	Taranaki
Charles Nicholson Macintosh	Forward	South Canterbury
Robert McKenzie	Forward	Auckland
William McKenzie	Wing forward	Wairarapa
John Mowlem	Forward	Manawatu
Frederick Murray	Forward	Auckland
Robert Oliphant	Wing forward	Wellington
Walter Pringle	Forward	Wellington
Charles Speight	Forward	Auckland
Angus Stuart	Forward	Wellington
Hoeroa Tiopira	Forward	Hawke's Bay
Billy Watson	Forward	Wairarapa

== Match summary ==
Complete list of matches played by New Zealand in Australia:

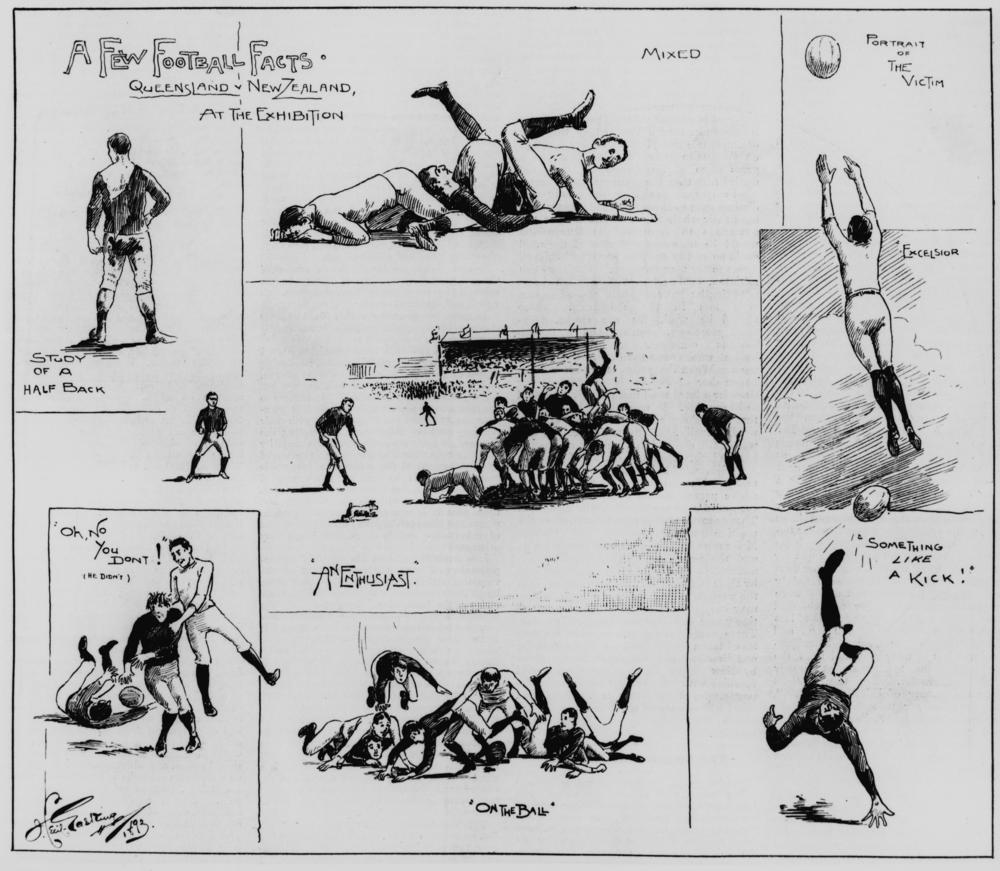
A series of sketches published in The Queenslander of one of New Zealand's matches against Queensland

#	Date	Rival	City	Venue	Score
1	28 Jun	Cumberland County	Sydney	Cumberland Oval	8–0
2	1 Jul	NSW Waratahs	Sydney	Cricket Ground	17–8
3	4 Jul	NSW Junior	Sydney	Cricket Ground	19–0
4	6 Jul	Northern District	Newcastle	Sports Ground	25–3
5	8 Jul	NSW Waratahs	Sydney	Cricket Ground	3–25
6	15 Jul	Queensland Reds	Brisbane	Exhibition Ground	14–3
7	19 Jul	Queensland Reds 2nd	Brisbane	Exhibition Ground	6–0
8	22 Jul	Queensland Reds	Brisbane	Exhibition Ground	36–0
9	26 Jul	Western District	Bathurst		24–5
10	29 Jul	NSW Waratahs	Sydney	Cricket Ground	16–0

Balance
Pl	W	D	L	Ps	Pc
10	9	0	1	168	44

== See also ==
- List of All Blacks tours and series
