= Bradley Slater =

New Zealand rugby union player

- Born: 23 September 1998 (age 28) New Plymouth, New Zealand
- Height: 186 cm (6 ft 1 in)
- Weight: 110 kg (243 lb; 17 st 5 lb)
- School: New Plymouth Boys' High School
- Notable relative(s): Andy Slater (father); Gordon Slater (uncle)

Rugby union career
- Position(s): Hooker, Flanker
- Current team: Taranaki, Blues
Senior career
Years	Team	Apps	(Points)
2017–	Taranaki	39	(25)
2019–2025	Chiefs	68	(35)
2026-	Blues	0	(0)
- Correct as of 20 April 2023

Bradley Slater (born 23 September 1998) is a New Zealand rugby union player who plays for the Blues in Super Rugby and Taranaki in the National Provincial Championship. His playing position is hooker.

The son of Taranaki representative Andy Slater he played for New Plymouth Boys' High School and in 2019 was part of the New Zealand national under-20 rugby union team squad.

He was named in the Chiefs squad for week 3 of the 2019 Super Rugby. Slater was signed with the Blues for the 2026 Super Rugby season.
