= Bryce Robins =

Bryce Robins may refer to:

- Bryce Robins (rugby union, born 1980), New Zealand-born Japanese rugby union player
- Bryce Robins (rugby union, born 1958), his father, New Zealand rugby union player
