= Davy Johnston =

- Full name: David Johnston
- Born: 24 March 1903 Okaiawa, New Zealand
- Died: 5 July 1938 (aged 35) New Plymouth, New Zealand
- Height: 173 cm (5 ft 8 in)
- Weight: 68 kg (150 lb)

Rugby union career
- Position: First five eighth
Provincial / State sides
| Years | Team | Apps | (Points) |
| 1922–32 | Taranaki | | |
International career
| Years | Team | Apps | (Points) |
| 1925 | New Zealand | | |

David Johnston (24 March 1903 – 5 July 1938) was a New Zealand international rugby union player.

Johnston was an inside back known for his tactical nous and represented Taranaki regularly from 1922 to 1932. He unsuccessfully trialled for the All Blacks several times until gaining a call up in 1925, as a replacement for Joseph Bell on a tour of Australia, where he would make two uncapped appearances.

After a period of ill health, Johnston died at a New Plymouth hospital in 1938, aged 35.

== See also ==
- List of New Zealand national rugby union players
