= Jimmie O'Sullivan =

New Zealand international rugby union player

- Born: James Michael O'Sullivan; 5 February 1883 Okaiawa, Taranaki, New Zealand
- Died: 21 December 1960 (aged 77) Hāwera, New Zealand
- Height: 1.78 m (5 ft 10 in)
- Weight: 86 kg (190 lb)
- School: Matapu School, Southern Taranaki
- Occupation: Dairy farmer

Rugby union career
- Position: Loose forward
Provincial / State sides
Years	Team	Apps	(Points)
1901–09	Taranaki		
International career
Years	Team	Apps	(Points)
1905–07	New Zealand	5	(0)

James Michael O'Sullivan (5 February 1883 – 21 December 1960) was a New Zealand rugby union player. A loose forward, O'Sullivan represented Taranaki at a provincial level, and was a member of the New Zealand national side, the All Blacks, from 1905 to 1907. He played 29 matches for the All Blacks five of which were internationals, including the famous "Match of the Century" against Wales. He later served as president of the Taranaki Rugby Union.

O'Sullivan died in Hāwera on 21 December 1960, and was buried at Hāwera Cemetery.
