= Wiremu Kīngi =

Wiremu Kīngi may refer to:

- Wiremu Kīngi Maketū (c. 1824 – 7 March 1842), a Ngāpuhi Māori who was the first person executed in New Zealand under British rule
- Wiremu Kīngi Moki Te Matakātea (c. 1800s – 14 February 1893), a chief of the Māori tribe known as Taranaki
- Wiremu Kīngi Te Rangitāke, (c. 1790s – 13 January 1882), a chief of the Te Āti Awa tribe who led Māori forces in the First Taranaki War
