= Hugh Good (rugby union) =

New Zealand international rugby union player

- Born: Hugh Maurice Good; 29 September 1871 Urenui, New Zealand
- Died: 3 July 1941 (aged 69) Stratford, New Zealand
- Weight: 92 kg (203 lb)
- School: Wanganui Collegiate School
- Notable relative: Alan Good (brother)

Rugby union career
- Position: Wing Three-quarter
Provincial / State sides
Years	Team	Apps	(Points)
1889–1896	Taranaki		
International career
Years	Team	Apps	(Points)
1894	New Zealand	0	

Hugh Maurice Good (29 September 1871 – 3 July 1941) was a New Zealand rugby union player who was a member of the New Zealand national team in 1894. His position of choice was wing three-quarter. Good did not play any test matches as New Zealand did not play their first until 1903.

== Early life and family ==
Good was born in Urenui, one of nine children of Thomas Good and Sarah Gates. He received his education at Wanganui Collegiate School. A sister, Fanny, was a botanical artist, and two of his brothers, Harry (a forward) and Alan (also a wing) represented Taranaki. Alan played for New Zealand in 1893.

== Athletics ==
He was also an amateur athlete and in 1898 won the national title for high jump and also shot put. He could also run the 100 metres in just over 10 seconds.

== Rugby union ==
Good was still in his last year of school when he made his debut for his province, Taranaki in 1889.

He played in a national trial in 1893. Successful, Good was selected for the tour of Australia. He was labelled a "reinforcement" as members of the original team suffered injuries. Unfortunately, Good was unable to go on the tour, as he could not gain work leave. Coincidentally his brother, Alan played four games on the tour.

Just one year later, Good played for the Taranaki side in a game against the touring Waratahs. Good scored a try and kicked a goal in the 21–6 win. Based on this performance Good was selected for the New Zealand team to play in the unofficial international against the visitors. The match was lost 8–6.

Opportunities to be selected again were only presented twice in the 1890s, first in 1896 and then 1897 but Good failed to make a team. He continued playing for Taranaki provincially until 1896.
