= Kivell =

Kivell is a surname. Notable people with the surname include:

- Alfred Kivell (1897–1987), New Zealand rugby union player
- David Kivell (1932–2022), New Zealand cricketer
- Gretchen Kivell (born 1948), New Zealand chemical engineer
- Rex Nan Kivell (1898–1977), New Zealand-born British art collector

== See also ==
- Kivel
