= William Roberts (rugby union) =

NZ international rugby union player

- Born: William Roberts; 28 October 1871 Taitā, Lower Hutt, New Zealand
- Died: 25 August 1937 (aged 65) Wellington, New Zealand
- School: Mount Cook School (Wellington)

Rugby union career
- Position(s): Centre Three-quarter, Second five-eighth
Amateur team(s)
Years	Team	Apps	(Points)
1889–90	Melrose		
1892–94, 96–97, 99–1903	Poneke		
1895	Petone		
Provincial / State sides
Years	Team	Apps	(Points)
1889–90, 1892–97, 99–1903	Wellington	47	
International career
Years	Team	Apps	(Points)
1896–97	New Zealand	0	(0)

William Roberts (28 October 1871 – 25 August 1937) was a New Zealand rugby union player who represented the All Blacks between 1896 and 1897. His positions of choice were centre three-quarter and second five-eighth. Roberts did not play in any test matches as New Zealand did not play their first until 1903.

== Early years ==
Roberts was born in the Lower Hutt suburb of Taitā. He was known by the nickname Cocky.

He was educated at Mount Cook School, Wellington.

== Playing career ==
Roberts played for three clubs in total, during a career which spanned more than a decade.

He made his provincial debut for Wellington as a 17-year-old.

In 1896, Roberts played in the game for Wellington against the touring Queensland team. This game was won 49–7 and Roberts scored three tries.

Roberts was then selected for the national side, in what was named an "unofficial" test against the Queensland visitors. This game was won 9–0.

The next year, he played in the 1897 North against South Island match. He played an outstanding game and it was shock that he was not chosen immediately to tour Australia. However, he was later called into the squad as an injury replacement.

He played the last six tour matches and this included scoring three tries in the second fixture against New South Wales.

After the tour the team played the Auckland provincial side when they returned to New Zealand. The All Blacks lost 11–10. During the post-match gathering, Roberts and teammate Joe Calnan were suspended from playing any level of rugby for two seasons due to inappropriate behaviour.

He never appeared for the national side again but continued playing club and provincial rugby until 1903.
