= Rod Gray =

- Born: Roderick Gray; 22 October 1870 Masterton, New Zealand
- Died: 27 May 1951 (aged 80) Taratahi, Wairarapa, New Zealand
- Occupation: Farmer

Rugby union career
- Position: Utility forward
Provincial / State sides
Years	Team	Apps	(Points)
1891–97	Wairarapa	15	
International career
Years	Team	Apps	(Points)
1893	New Zealand	0	(0)

Roderick Gray (22 October 1870 – 27 May 1951) was a New Zealand rugby union player.

Gray was born in Masterton in 1870, and he received his education there. A utility forward, Gray represented Wairarapa at a provincial level, playing 15 games for the team between 1891 and 1897. He played two games for the New Zealand national rugby union team on their 1893 tour of Australia. Initially passed over in the trials, he was called up (together with Billy Watson) as reinforcement, and arrived in time to play the last two games of the tour. He did not appear in any Test matches as New Zealand did not play its first full international until 1903.

Gray worked as a farmer and is said to have been a 'fine miler'. He died on 27 May 1951 at Taratahi in the Wairarapa, and was buried at the Archer Street Cemetery in Masterton.
