= Ōpunake =

Settlement in Taranaki Region, New Zealand

- Small urban area
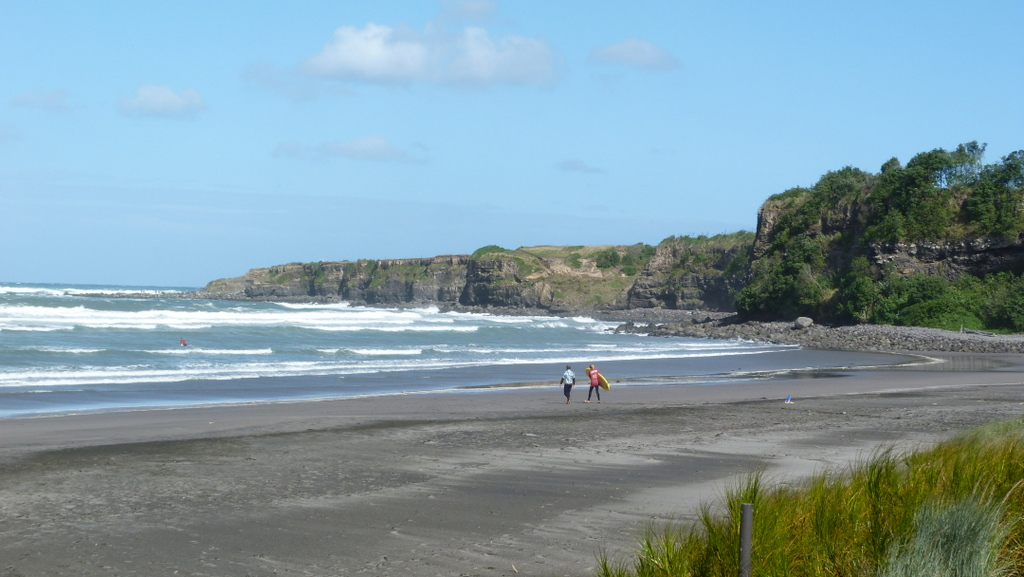
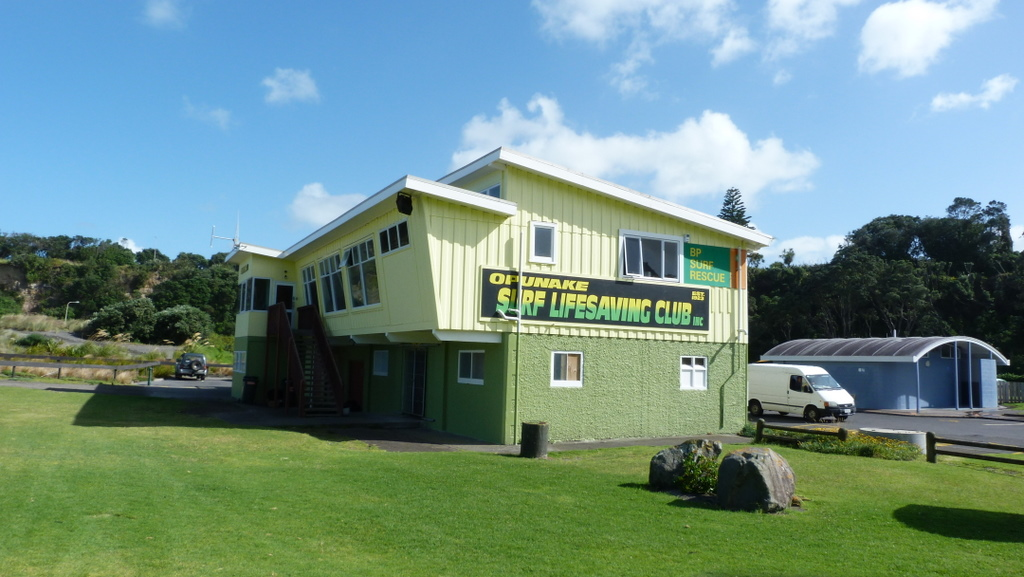
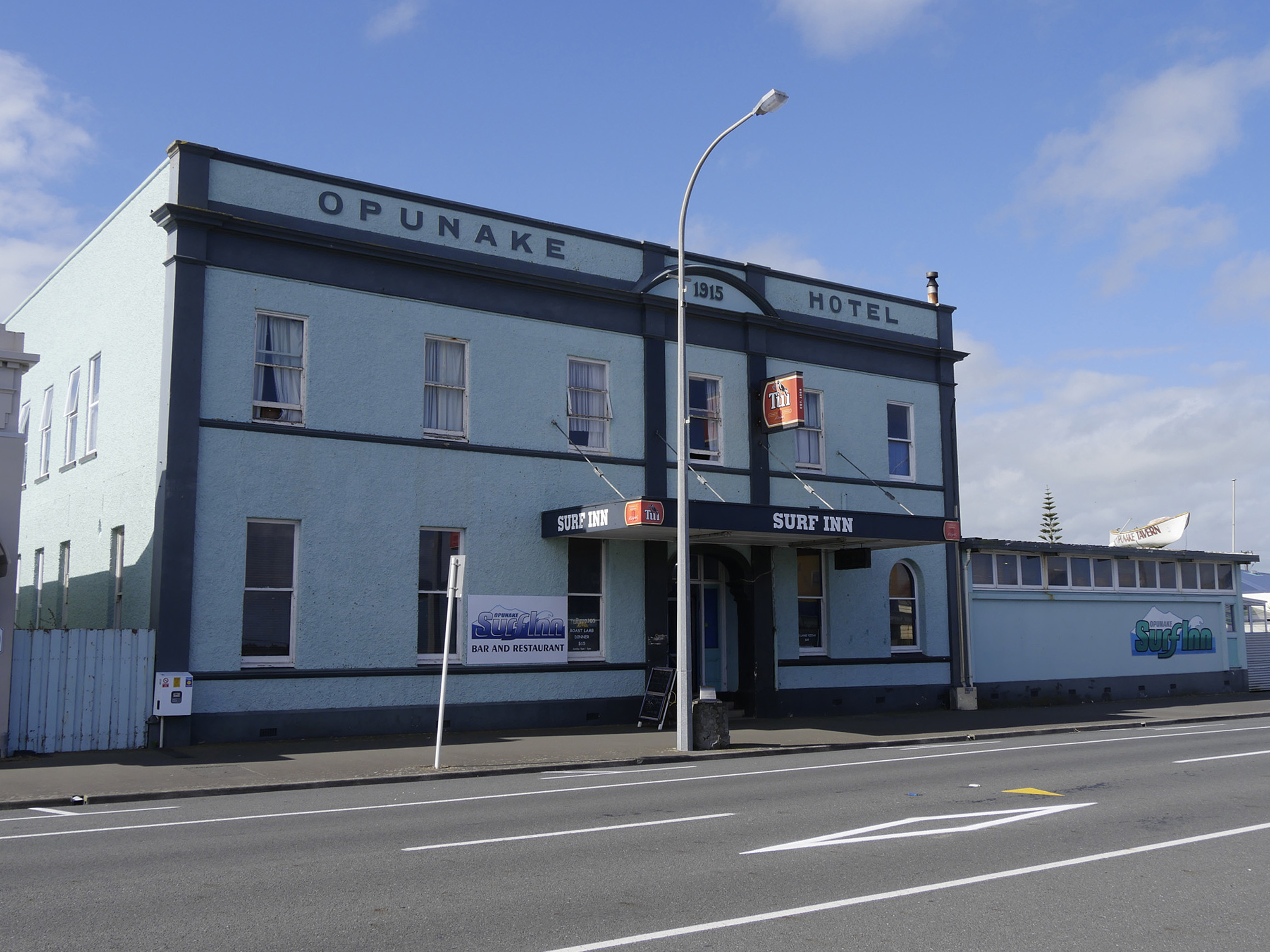
- Ōpunake Beach Surf Lifesaving Club Ōpunake Hotel
- Etymology: ō: place of; puna: springs; kē: been always
- Interactive map of Ōpunake
- Coordinates: 39°27′S 173°51′E
- Country: New Zealand
- Region: Taranaki
- Territorial authority: South Taranaki District
- Wards: Taranaki Coastal General Ward; Te Kūrae Māori Ward
- Community: Taranaki Coastal Community
- Iwi: Taranaki
- Established: c. 1866
- Electorates: New Plymouth; Te Tai Hauāuru (Māori)

Government
  - Territorial Authority: South Taranaki District Council
  - Regional council: Taranaki Regional Council
  - Mayor of South Taranaki: Phil Nixon
  - New Plymouth MP: David MacLeod
  - Te Tai Hauāuru MP: Debbie Ngarewa-Packer

Area
  - Total: 3.78 km^{2} (1.46 sq mi)

Population (June 2025)
  - Total: 1,470
  - Density: 389/km^{2} (1,010/sq mi)
- Postcodes: 4616
- Area code: 06

Ōpunake (Māori: [ɔːˈpʉnaˈkɛː]) is a small urban area in the North Island of New Zealand, located within the Taranaki region and governed by the South Taranaki District Council. Positioned along State Highway 45, it lies between Hāwera to the south and New Plymouth to the north. According to the New Zealand Ministry for Culture and Heritage, the Māori meaning of Ōpunake is "the place of where the springs have always been".

== History ==
=== Pre-European history ===
In 1833 local chief Wiremu Kīngi Moki Te Matakātea held off a war party from Waikato for several weeks with a single musket, and eventually triumphed. The site of Te Namu Pā is along the coast, just north of the town.

=== European settlement ===
The town was first settled by Europeans in the 1860s, when British army soldiers landed at Ōpunake in April 1865 in the Second Taranaki War. By May, soldiers had constructed the Ōpunake Redoubt, where 350 soldiers were stationed. In May 1867, the redoubt was gifted to Wiremu Kīngi Moki Te Matakātea's people, and the area became a location for flax mills, outside European influence. British soldiers re-established a presence at the redoubt in 1875, and the area became a rallying point for soldiers during the invasion of Parihaka. By circa 1887, the redoubt was abandoned. Ōpunake was intended to be a major port but, other than a jetty constructed in 1891, little else was completed.

=== Marae ===
Ōpunake has two marae.

- Ōeo Marae and Tipua Horonuku and Tipua Hororangi meeting houses are affiliated with the Ngāruahine hapū of Ngāti Tamaahuroa me Tītahi.
- Ōrimupiko Marae and Ōhinetuhirau meeting house are a meeting place for the Taranaki hapū of Ngāti Haumia, Ngāti Tamarongo and Ngāti Kahumate.

In October 2020, the Government committed $153,419 from the Provincial Growth Fund to seal the driveway of the marae and paint the outside of all buildings, creating 12 jobs.

=== Pā ===
Ōpunake is home to two pā.

- Te Namu Pā in the North West along the Otahi Stream and Te Namu road.
- An unnamed pā in the South East which can be found along Park Pl near the Constabulary Cemetery by the lake.

The condition of these pā vary, Te Namu Pā is mostly held up, the village and trenches no longer exist. However, little remains of the pā in the South East.

==== History of Te Namu Pā ====
Wiremu Kīngi Moki Te Matakātea led 120 men in a battle at Te Namu Pā against a Waikato contingent numbering approximately 800. The Waikato raid was unsuccessful and eventually retreated; those who were left behind were cremated in front of the pā. Wiremu Kīngi Moki Te Matakātea and his men won the battle partly because of the Geography and because of the singular musket that they had. The only entrance to the pā was accessible by following the Otahi stream around the back of it along a narrow walkway. The pā was attacked 5 times by Waikato forces with no success. Te Namu Pā is also rumoured to be named 'Kaiaia'.

The village that was made at Te Namu Pā in 1833 was destroyed by an landing party from HMS Alligator of 1834. The site is now considered a Urupa (Burial ground).

"Greg O'Brien, poet, painter, editor and journalist, remembers Te Namu's association with Parihaka. He wrote: "my mother recalls an elderly aunt's recollection of the Parihaka siege—her description of a line of women singing, surrounding the settlement as the troops approached.) What escapes us, the land, kumara-pitted, remembers—adze heads recovered from among boulders, the faded shadows that were trenches around Te Namu pa. The site of the first fighting between British infantry—the 50th Regiment, 'the Dirty Half Hundred'— and Maori.""

== Demographics ==
Stats NZ describes Ōpunake as a small urban area, which covers 3.78 km^{2} (1.46 sq mi). It had an estimated population of 1,470 as of June 2025, with a population density of 389 people per km^{2}.

Historical population
| Year | Pop. | ±% p.a. |
|---|---|---|
| 2006 | 1,365 | — |
| 2013 | 1,335 | −0.32% |
| 2018 | 1,401 | +0.97% |
| 2023 | 1,476 | +1.05% |

Ōpunake had a population of 1,476 in the 2023 New Zealand census, an increase of 75 people (5.4%) since the 2018 census, and an increase of 141 people (10.6%) since the 2013 census. There were 717 males, 759 females, and 3 people of other genders in 600 dwellings. 2.8% of people identified as LGBTIQ+. The median age was 45.9 years (compared with 38.1 years nationally). There were 279 people (18.9%) aged under 15 years, 222 (15.0%) aged 15 to 29, 654 (44.3%) aged 30 to 64, and 324 (22.0%) aged 65 or older.

People could identify as more than one ethnicity. The results were 79.5% European (Pākehā); 38.6% Māori; 2.6% Pasifika; 2.6% Asian; 0.2% Middle Eastern, Latin American and African New Zealanders (MELAA); and 2.8% other, which includes people giving their ethnicity as "New Zealander". English was spoken by 97.4%, Māori by 6.3%, Samoan by 0.2%, and other languages by 3.5%. No language could be spoken by 1.8% (e.g. too young to talk). New Zealand Sign Language was known by 0.4%. The percentage of people born overseas was 9.8, compared with 28.8% nationally.

Religious affiliations were 28.7% Christian, 0.6% Hindu, 2.6% Māori religious beliefs, 0.2% Buddhist, 0.8% New Age, 0.2% Jewish, and 1.0% other religions. People who answered that they had no religion were 57.1%, and 9.1% of people did not answer the census question.

Of those at least 15 years old, 171 (14.3%) people had a bachelor's or higher degree, 645 (53.9%) had a post-high school certificate or diploma, and 384 (32.1%) people exclusively held high school qualifications. The median income was $32,600, compared with $41,500 nationally. 66 people (5.5%) earned over $100,000 compared to 12.1% nationally. The employment status of those at least 15 was 516 (43.1%) full-time, 165 (13.8%) part-time, and 48 (4.0%) unemployed.

== Education ==
Ōpunake Primary School is a co-educational school for students in Years 1 to 8, with an enrolment of 153 as of July 2026. Originally known as Ōpunake School, it was established in 1881 as the first school in the area. In 1919, during the influenza epidemic, the school was destroyed by fire. Students were temporarily taught at the local town hall until the school was rebuilt and reopened the following year.

St Joseph's School Ōpunake is a co-educational catholic primary school for students in Years 1 to 8, with an enrolment of 123 as of July 2026. Founded in 1901 by the Sisters of Our Lady of the Missions, its first teachers were sister Mary of Nazareth, sister Mary St Marcella, and sister Mary St John of the Cross. In 1917, father Doolaghty secured land for a larger school, and by 1923, the new building was officially opened by archbishop Thomas O'Shea.

Ōpunake High School is a co-educational secondary school for students in Years 9 to 13, with an enrolment of 318 as of July 2026. The area's first secondary education began in 1920, with nine students receiving lessons at St Barnabas Church Hall. By 1924, a secondary department was introduced on the primary school grounds, and in 1925, Ōpunake District High School was officially established.

Te Kura Kaupapa Māori o Tamarongo is a co-educational kura kaupapa Māori school that provides Māori-language immersion education, with an enrolment of 25 as of July 2026. Initially founded as a private school in 1991, it became a fully state-funded kura in 1995, catering to students in Years 1 to 8. Tamarongo holds the distinction of being the first accredited kura kaupapa Māori in the Aotea District.

== Notable people ==
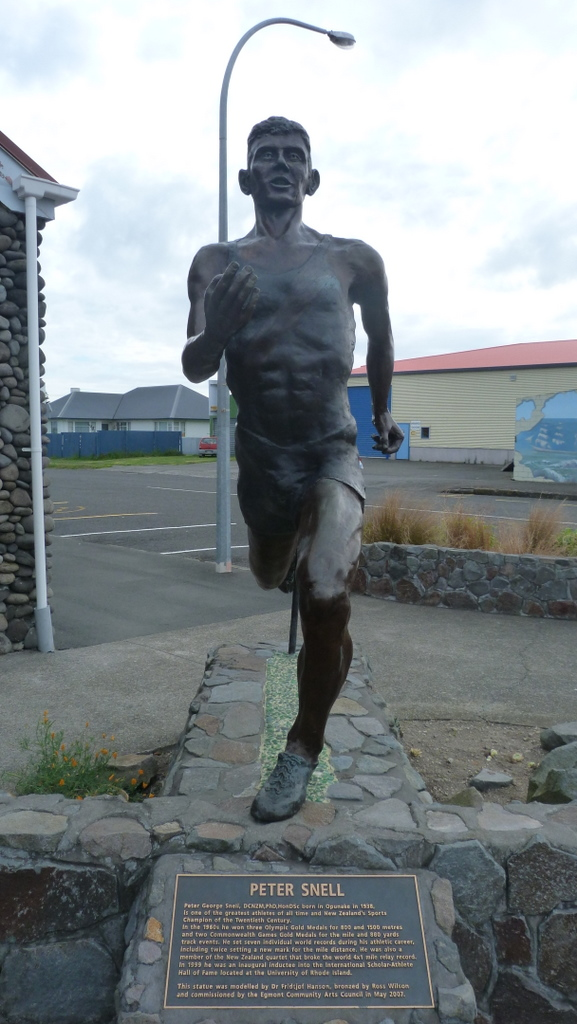
Peter Snell statue located in Ōpunake

- Shane Ardern (1960–present), politician
- Craig Barrett (1971–present), racewalker
- Jim Bolger (1935–2025), politician
- Glen Chadwick (1976–present), cyclist
- Claude Clegg (1913–1991), track and field athlete
- Oscar Goodman (2007–present), basketball player
- Carl Hayman (1979–present), rugby union player
- Jim Hickey (1949–present), broadcaster
- Mary St Domitille Hickey (1882–1958), catholic nun
- Barbara Kuriger (1961–present), politician
- Jack McLeod (1909–unknown), rugby league player
- Graham Mourie (1952–present), rugby union player
- Peter Snell (1938–2019), middle-distance runner
- Jacquie Sturm (1927–2009), poet
- Roger Urbahn (1934–1984), rugby union player
- Matthew Walker (1977–present), cricketer

== See also ==
- Ōpunake branch
