= Ernest Glennie =

NZ international rugby union player

- Born: 8 February 1870 Queenstown, New Zealand
- Died: 16 July 1908 (aged 38) Invercargill, New Zealand
- Weight: 71 kg (157 lb)

Rugby union career
- Position(s): Halfback; Five-Eighth; Wing-forward
Amateur team(s)
Years	Team	Apps	(Points)
- Pirates (Invercargill)
1896—97	Linwood		
Provincial / State sides
Years	Team	Apps	(Points)
1896—97	Canterbury	9	
International career
Years	Team	Apps	(Points)
1897	New Zealand		

Ernest Glennie (8 February 1870— 16 July 1908) was a New Zealand rugby union player who represented the New Zealand national team, the All Blacks in 1897. His positions of choice were halfback, five-eighth and wing-forward.

He was understood to have been born in Queenstown.

== Career ==
Glennie initially played for the Pirates club in Invercargill.

He then moved to Canterbury, and played for the Linwood club in Christchurch. It was here Glennie made the Canterbury provincial side, playing nine games between 1896 and 1897. He played mostly as a forward.

He was described as a "speedy wing-forward".

After playing in the inaugural South against North Island match in 1897, Glennie was selected for the 11-match tour of Australia, that same year.

Glennie played in six matches on the tour, three of these played as a wing-forward (modern day flanker), two as a halfback and one as a five-eighth.

He scored four tries as an All Black totalling twelve points.
