= Mark Urwin =

- Full name: Mark Gordon Urwin
- Born: 10 February 1976 (age 50)

Rugby union career
- Position: First five-eighth / Fullback
Provincial / State sides
Years	Team	Apps	(Points)
1997–03	Taranaki	84	(361)
Super Rugby
Years	Team	Apps	(Points)
2001	Highlanders	3	(0)

Mark Gordon Urwin (born 10 February 1976) is a New Zealand former professional rugby union player.

Urwin attended New Plymouth Boys' High School and was a member of their 1992 secondary schools Rugby World Cup-winning side, which was led by Michael Collins and included future All Blacks captain Reuben Thorne.

A Taranaki player, Urwin was used by the province initially at fullback, then as a first five-eighth, and was also a capable goal-kicker. He competed for the Highlanders in the 2001 Super 12 season, making three appearances.
