= Ash Gardiner =

New Zealand rugby union player (1946–2021)

- Born: Ashley John Gardiner; 10 December 1946 New Plymouth, New Zealand
- Died: 18 January 2021 (aged 74) New Plymouth, New Zealand
- Height: 1.85 m (6 ft 1 in)
- Weight: 102 kg (225 lb)
- School: New Plymouth Boys' High School

Rugby union career
- Position: Prop
Provincial / State sides
Years	Team	Apps	(Points)
1966–75	Taranaki	102	
International career
Years	Team	Apps	(Points)
1974	New Zealand	1	(0)

Ashley John Gardiner (10 December 1946 – 18 January 2021) was a New Zealand rugby union player. A prop, All Black number 728. Gardiner represented Taranaki at a provincial level, and was a member of the New Zealand national side, the All Blacks, in 1974 on the tours of Australia and Ireland. He played 11 matches for the All Blacks including one international.

Gardiner died in New Plymouth on 18 January 2021.
