= Alfred West =

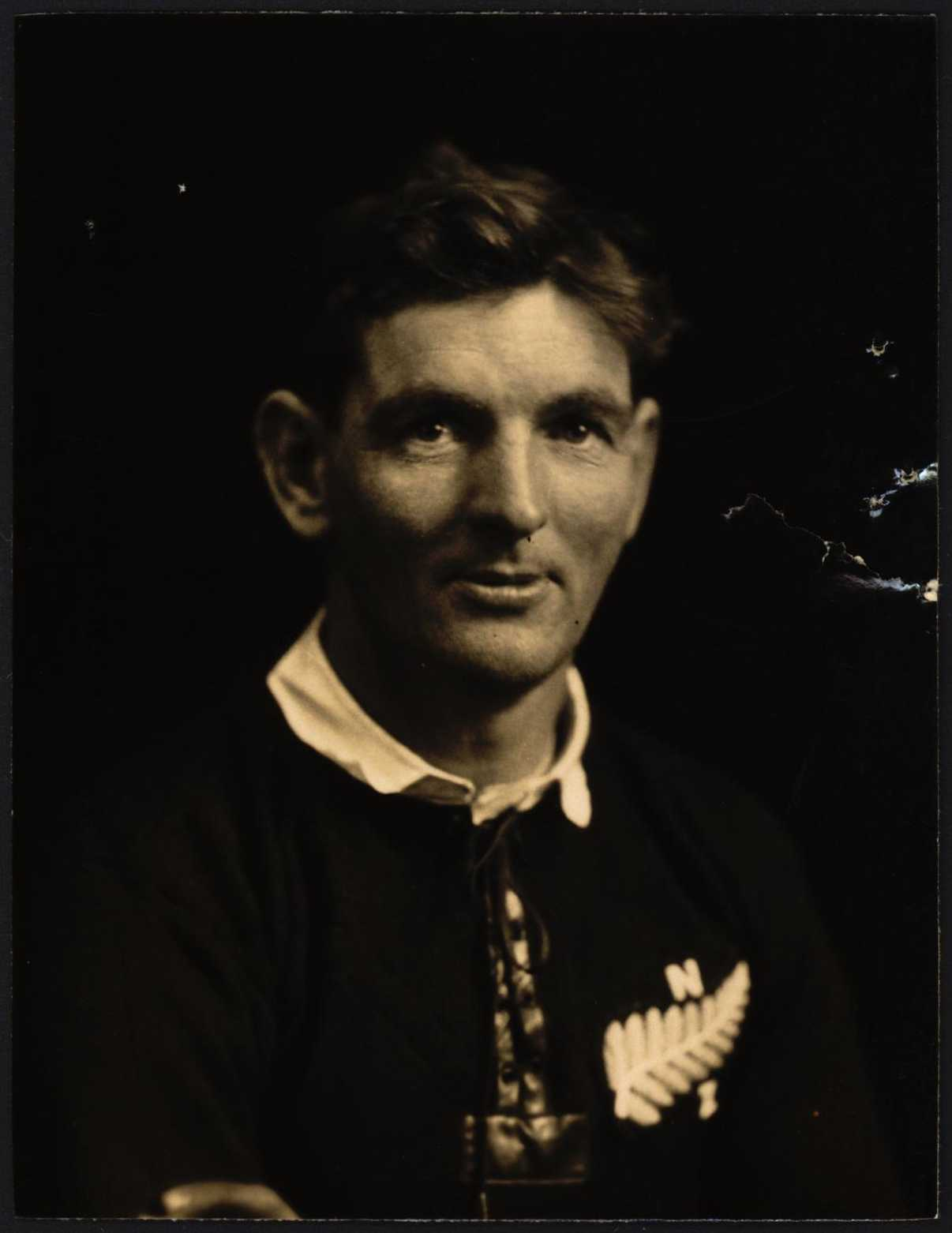
- Born: Alfred Hubert West; 6 May 1893 Inglewood, New Zealand
- Died: 7 January 1934 (aged 40) Hāwera, New Zealand
- School: Matapu School, Southern Taranaki

Rugby union career
- Position: Forward
Amateur team(s)
Years	Team	Apps	(Points)
- Hawera RFC
International career
Years	Team	Apps	(Points)
1921	New Zealand	2	(0)

Alfred Hubert West (6 May 1893 – 7 January 1934) was a New Zealand international rugby union forward who played club rugby for Hawera and was capped twice for New Zealand.

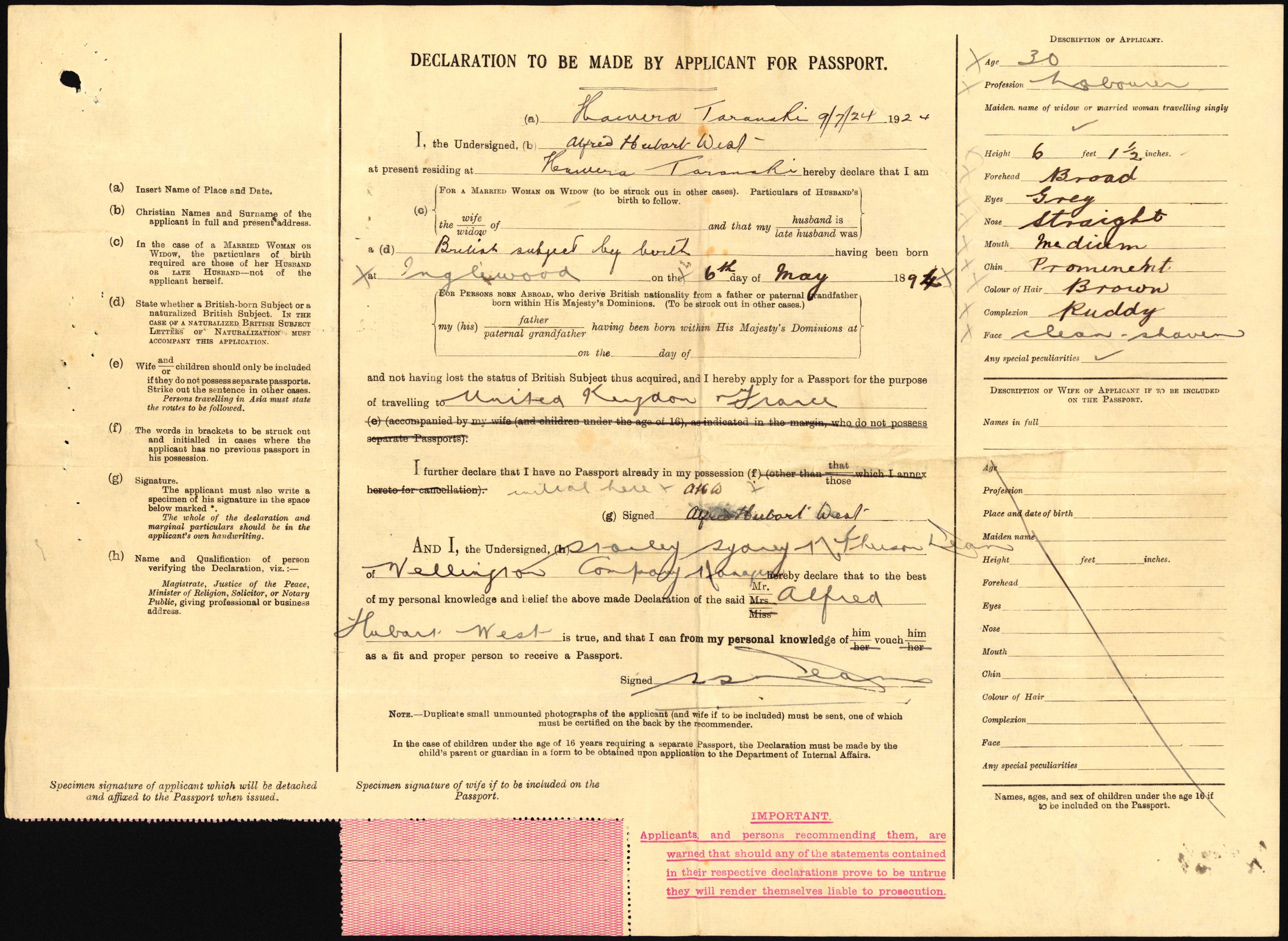
Alfred West passport application (1924)

== Bibliography ==
- Billot, John (1972). All Blacks in Wales. Ferndale: Ron Jones Publications.
