= Robert Handcock (rugby union) =

- Born: Robert Alexander Hancock; 6 April 1874 Auckland, New Zealand
- Died: 27 January 1956 (aged 81) Auckland, New Zealand
- Weight: 76 kg (168 lb)

Rugby union career
- Position: Forward
Amateur team(s)
Years	Team	Apps	(Points)
- Grafton
1896, 1903	Parnell		
Provincial / State sides
Years	Team	Apps	(Points)
1896, 1903	Auckland	4	
International career
Years	Team	Apps	(Points)
1897	New Zealand		

Robert Alexander Handcock (6 April 1874 – 27 January 1956) was a New Zealand rugby union player who represented the All Blacks in 1897. His position of choice was forward. Handcock did not play in any test matches as New Zealand did not play their first until 1903.

He was born in Auckland in 1874.

He died in Auckland in 1956.

== Career ==
Although he was listed as a forward Handcock mainly played as a Hooker.

He initially played for the Grafton club but then switched to the Parnell club. It was here Handcock made the Auckland provincial side debuting in 1896. He made 3 appearances.

In those three games and after appearing in the inaugural North against South Island match Handcock was selected for an 11-match tour of Australia.

He played in eight of the matches where he scored three tries.

He had a 6-year absence from first-class rugby until 1903, where he made one final appearance for the Auckland union.

Although he had an unusual playing career in those days it wasn't uncommon to have more caps for their country than a provincial side.
