= Roger Boon =

New Zealand rugby union player (1935–2023)

- Born: Roger John Boon; 23 February 1935 New Plymouth, New Zealand
- Died: 9 June 2023 (aged 88) Whanganui, New Zealand
- Height: 1.79 m (5 ft 10 in)
- Weight: 92 kg (203 lb)
- School: Wanganui Collegiate School
- Occupations: Builder; farmer

Rugby union career
- Position: Hooker
Provincial / State sides
Years	Team	Apps	(Points)
1956–1960	Taranaki	47	
International career
Years	Team	Apps	(Points)
1960	New Zealand	0	(0)
Coaching career
- Years: Team
- 1982–1984: Wanganui

Roger John Boon (23 February 1935 – 9 June 2023) was a New Zealand rugby union player. A hooker, Boon represented Taranaki at a provincial level, and was a member of the New Zealand national side, the All Blacks, on their 1960 tour of South Africa, being called in as replacement for the injured Ron Hemi. He played six matches for the All Blacks on that tour, before suffering an injury that ended his first-class rugby career. Boon did not appear in any Test matches, although he did play in the tour match against Rhodesia. He later served as selector coach of the Wanganui representative team between 1982 and 1984.

Boon died in Whanganui on 9 June 2023, at the age of 88.
