= Barney Armit =

- Born: Alexander McNaughton Armit; 27 March 1874 Inverkeithing, Fife, Scotland
- Died: 12 November 1899 (aged 25) Dunedin, New Zealand
- Weight: 73 kg (161 lb)
- Occupation: Firefighter

Rugby union career
- Position: Wing
Amateur team(s)
Years	Team	Apps	(Points)
1892–1899	Kaikorai		
Provincial / State sides
Years	Team	Apps	(Points)
1893–1899	Otago	19	
1897	South Island	1	
International career
Years	Team	Apps	(Points)
1897	New Zealand	9	(21)

Alexander McNaughton "Barney" Armit (27 March 1874 – 12 November 1899) was a New Zealand rugby union player. He represented New Zealand on their 1897 tour of Australia, however he is best remembered for having died from injuries sustained while playing a match in 1899. He represented Otago from 1893 until his death, and played for the South Island in the Inter-Island match of 1897.

== Early life ==
Born in the town of Inverkeithing in Fife, Scotland, on 27 March 1874, Armit was the son of John Armit and Ann McNaughton.

== Career ==
After playing for the Kaikorai Rugby Football Club from 1892, Armit was selected to represent Otago in 1893, with his first match against Canterbury. He continued to play for Kaikorai and Otago throughout the following six years, and in 1897 was selected for the South Island in the first ever Inter-Island match.

In 1897 Armit, along with Kaikorai and Otago teammate Jimmy Duncan, was selected for the New Zealand team to tour Australia. Two previous tours had been conducted by New Zealand representative sides to Australia; the first in 1884 was conducted without the oversight of a national body, and in 1893, after the formation of the New Zealand Football Rugby Union a second tour was conducted. Armit's province, Otago, had initially refused to join the NZRFU (and so the 1893 side included no Otago players), but they joined in 1895, making Otago-based players eligible for selection for the 1897 tour. Armit played nine matches on the ten-match tour and in the process scored seven tries, including one try each in the two matches he played against New South Wales. Despite suffering an injury prior to the tour, Armit recovered enough to play most of the tours' fixtures, and particularly impressed with his "bumping". During the match against Northern New South Wales at Newcastle, he had ball in hand and was attempting to score a try but had an opponent in his way; Armit continued to run while ramming his shoulder into the player's abdomen, thereby propelling his opponent over a fence. This was followed by in an incident in the last match against New South Wales where an Armit bump broke the rib of opponent Stan Wickham.

== Injury and Death ==
Armit was fatally injured during a provincial match between Otago and Taranaki. He had a reputation as a very quick wing three-quarter, and had a knack for hurdling over opponents as they tried to tackle him. At one point in the match Armit was running with the ball and attempted to hurdle his opposite, fellow New Zealand representative Alfred Bayly, but Bayly rose up and caught him around the ankles; Armit was subsequently up-ended and he seriously injured his spine in the fall. Armit died 11 weeks later and became the first New Zealand international to die from injuries sustained on the rugby field. According to his obituary, Bayly was extremely distraught by the incident and "wept like a child" on Armit's death—it may have even shortened his life.

== Sources ==
- McCarthy, Winston (1968). Haka! The All Blacks Story. London: Pelham Books.
- McLean, Terry (1959). Great Days in New Zealand Rugby. Wellington, New Zealand: A. H. & A. W. Reed.
