= Archie D'Arcy =

New Zealand rugby union player (1870-1919)

- Born: Archibald Edgar D'Arcy; 18 September 1870 Masterton, New Zealand
- Died: 22 May 1919 (aged 48)
- Weight: 86 kg (13.5 st)

Rugby union career
- Position: Fullback
Amateur team(s)
Years	Team	Apps	(Points)
–1890	Red Star		
1891–	Masterton Rugby Football Club		
Provincial / State sides
Years	Team	Apps	(Points)
1886–94	Wairarapa		
International career
Years	Team	Apps	(Points)
1893–94	New Zealand	7	(21)

Archibald D'Arcy (18 September 1870 – 22 June 1919) was a New Zealand rugby union player. D'Arcy was born and raised in Masterton, New Zealand, and first played rugby for the Red Star club before later playing with Masterton. He was first selected for Wairarapa Rugby Football Union, his provincial side, at age 16, and continued to play for them until 1894. As an administrator he represented the Wairarapa Rugby Football Union in 1891 at an inter-provincial meeting where the formation of the New Zealand Rugby Football Union (NZRFU) as first discussed. He was selected, as a fullback, for the first NZRFU-sanctioned New Zealand side, which toured Australia in 1893. Captained by Thomas Ellison, the team played eleven matches, including three against New South Wales, and lost only one. Despite being selected as a fullback, D'Arcy played two matches on the tour in the forwards.

He was again selected for New Zealand in 1894, this time to play the touring New South Wales side. That was his final match for New Zealand—his seventh international appearance. In later life he worked in the insurance industry, and died in 1919 in either Sydney or Auckland.

== Sources ==
- Luxford, Bob. "Archie D'Arcy". New Zealand Rugby.
- McCarthy, Winston (1968). Haka! The All Blacks Story. London: Pelham Books.
- "Rugby Football". Free Lance. 9 July 1919. p. 27.
