= Bill Currey =

- Born: William Douglas Roy Currey; 2 June 1944 Auckland, New Zealand
- Died: 9 February 2023 (aged 78) Auckland, New Zealand
- Height: 1.76 m (5 ft 9 in)
- Weight: 76 kg (168 lb)
- School: Auckland Grammar School
- Occupation: School teacher

Rugby union career
- Position: Wing
Provincial / State sides
| Years | Team | Apps | (Points) |
| 1967–1972 | Taranaki | 67 | |
International career
| Years | Team | Apps | (Points) |
| 1968 | New Zealand | 0 | (0) |

William Douglas Roy Currey (2 June 1944 – 9 February 2023) was a New Zealand rugby union player. A wing three-quarter, Currey represented the Opunake club and Taranaki at a provincial level.

He was a member of the New Zealand national side, the All Blacks, on their 1968 tour of Australia and Fiji. He played seven matches for the All Blacks on that tour, but did not appear in any internationals.
