= Mark Robinson (rugby union, born 1974) =

NZ rugby union player (born 1974)

- Born: Mark Powell Robinson; 17 January 1974 (age 52) Stratford, New Zealand
- Height: 1.84 m (6 ft 0 in)
- Weight: 99 kg (218 lb)
- School: Opunake High School

Rugby union career
- Position(s): Centre, Fullback
Senior career
Years	Team	Apps	(Points)
	Wellington	3	(0)
1997–1998	Taranaki	18	(50)
1999–2003	Canterbury	25	(25)
2000–2002	Crusaders	23	(15)
1998/99	Bristol	6	
2004–2006	Kobelco Steelers	5	
International career
Years	Team	Apps	(Points)
1999	Barbarian F.C.	2	(5)
2000–2002	New Zealand	9	(5)

Mark Powell Robinson (born 17 January 1974) is a former New Zealand rugby union footballer. He played nine Test matches for the All Blacks between 2000 and 2002. He later became a rugby administrator, as CEO of New Zealand Rugby from 2020-2025.

Not to be confused with Mark Darren "Sharky" Robinson, the North Harbour and 1997-2001 All Black halfback, Mark Powell Robinson played mainly at centre in provincial rugby for Taranaki, Wellington and later Canterbury. In Super 12 rugby he played for the Crusaders, with whom he won two titles: in 2000 and 2002. It was while playing with the Crusaders that he played his only international rugby, two Tests in 2000 and seven in 2002.

== Playing career ==
From the same district in coastal Taranaki as another of New Zealand rugby's intellectuals, Graham Mourie, Robinson also moved to Wellington to study at Victoria University. He had only a brief time in the Wellington representative side, making four appearances in the mid 1990s. Most of his first class rugby in the 1994-96 seasons was with New Zealand Universities, for whom he played in eight matches including the 1996 world student games in South Africa.

Because of his Taranaki origins he also played in the 1994 Kieran Crowley farewell tribute match in New Plymouth.

He returned to Taranaki for the 1997-98 seasons, impressing immensely with his strong running and reliable defence in Taranaki's surprise success in 1997 in making the NPC semifinals. In one match against Southland he scored five tries.

After 18 matches for Taranaki, which was interspersed with his studies at Cambridge, Robinson linked up with Canterbury in time for the 1999 season and for the Crusaders in the 2000 Super 12. Though often affected by injuries Robinson was in the Crusaders which won the 2000 Super 12.

In 2000 Robinson received the first two of his All Blacks caps. He made his debut in the second test against Scotland at Eden Park scoring a try and played again in the tri-nations test against the Springboks in Christchurch.

Because of his injuries Robinson did not reappear in the All Blacks until the 2002 season. This proved to be his most effective season and as well as the All Blacks he played pretty much all of the year with the Crusaders, winning another Super 12 title, and also appearing regularly for Canterbury in the NPC and in Ranfurly Shield defences.

In the 2002 domestic season he was even preferred ahead of Tana Umaga for some of the internationals at centre. He played the warmup tests against Italy and Ireland and in tri-nations tests in Christchurch and Wellington against the Wallabies and the Springboks.

He had the last of his nine matches for the All Blacks, all of which were in tests, on the 2002 end of the year tour. He came on as a replacement in each of the internationals against England and Wales and was at second five eighths in the match against Wales.

Injuries meant Robinson in 2003 did not add to the 23 Super 12 matches he had for the Crusaders but he recovered to take part in Canterbury's NPC and shield campaigns taking his appearances for the province to 25. But even though his career spanned almost nine seasons Robinson was still short of 100 first class matches in New Zealand rugby when at the end of the 2003 season he took up an overseas contract.

Robinson departed New Zealand to play for the Kobe Steelers in 2004.

Mark Robinson was an intelligent and gifted midfield back who never reached his full potential for two major reasons. The first was his university studies for these took him out of the country at a crucial period in his career. A post graduate student at England's Cambridge University, he earned not only honours degrees there in political studies and philosophy, but also appeared twice in the famous Varsity match against Oxford and was awarded two blues.

The second, and probably more compelling, reason for his career being a little unfulfilled was a wretched run with injuries. Because of these Robinson missed all of the 2001 NPC season for Canterbury and all of the Super 12 for the Crusaders in 2003, the latter break effectively ending his international career by ruling him out of consideration for the World Cup squad.

== Rugby administrative career ==
In 2007 Robinson was named as the CEO of the Taranaki Rugby Football Union. He was appointed to the board of New Zealand Rugby in 2013, was elected to World Rugby's Executive Committee in 2014.

On 9 September 2019, Robinson was announced as the new Chief Executive of New Zealand Rugby, starting in January 2020.

On 9 June 2025, he announced his resignation as chief executive effective at the end of the year citing his intent to move to Australia to spend more time with his family.
