= Kivel =

Kivel is a surname. Notable people with the surname include:

- Barry Kivel (fl. 1984), American actor, director, editor, and producer
- Leandro Kivel (born 1983), Brazilian footballer

== See also ==
- Kivell
