= Maurice Herrold =

New Zealand rugby union player

- Born: 25 June 1869 Calcutta, Bengal Presidency, British India
- Died: 26 August 1949 (aged 80) Buenos Aires, Argentina
- Weight: 70 kg (150 lb)
- School: Auckland Grammar School; Napier Boys' High School

Rugby union career
- Position: Halfback
Provincial / State sides
Years	Team	Apps	(Points)
1887–87	Hawke's Bay		
1888–93	Auckland	8	
International career
Years	Team	Apps	(Points)
1893	New Zealand	0	(0)

Maurice Herrold (25 June 1869 – 26 August 1949) was a New Zealand rugby union player.

== Biography ==
Born in India to English parents, Herrold arrived with his family in New Zealand in 1880. He was educated at Napier Boys' High School and then at Auckland Grammar School. A halfback, Herrold eight times represented Auckland at a provincial level including two matches against touring 1888 British Lions. He was a member of the New Zealand national side on their 1893 tour to Australia. Troubled by injury he played two matches on the tour but did not appear in any of the major games against New South Wales or Queensland.
