= Alex Wilson (rugby union) =

- Born: Alexander Wilson; 28 July 1874 Auckland, New Zealand
- Died: 6 October 1932 (aged 58) Devonport, New Zealand
- Occupation: Storeman

Rugby union career
- Position: Forward
Provincial / State sides
| Years | Team | Apps | (Points) |
| 1896–1902 | Auckland | 11 | |
International career
| Years | Team | Apps | (Points) |
| 1897 | New Zealand | 0 | (0) |

Alexander Wilson (28 July 1874 – 6 October 1932) was a New Zealand rugby union player. A forward, Wilson represented Auckland at a provincial level, and was a member of the New Zealand national side on their 1897 tour of Australia. He played eight matches on that tour including the games against Queensland and New South Wales.

Wilson died at his home in Devonport, Auckland, on 6 October 1932, and was buried at O'Neill's Point Cemetery.
