= Claude Clegg (athlete) =

New Zealand javelin thrower (1913–1991)

Personal information
- Born: Claude Prosser Clegg; 14 July 1913 Ōpunake, New Zealand
- Died: 25 September 1991 (aged 78)
- Occupation: Schoolteacher
- Spouse: Jean Lorraine Bassett (m. 1940)

Sport
- Country: New Zealand
- Sport: Track and field

Achievements and titles
- National finals: Javelin champion (1936, 1938, 1947, 1948, 1949)

Claude Prosser Clegg (14 July 1913 – 25 September 1991) was a New Zealand javelin thrower, who represented his country at the 1950 British Empire Games.

== Early life and family ==
Born in Ōpunake on 14 July 1913, Clegg was the son of Sydney Rosina May Prosser and her husband Samuel James Clegg. In 1940, he married Jean Lorraine Bassett, and the couple went on to have two children.

== Athletics ==
Clegg won the New Zealand national javelin title five times: in 1936, 1938, 1947, 1948, and 1949.

At the 1950 British Empire Games in Auckland, Clegg finished fifth in the men's javelin, with a best throw of 175 ft 11 in (53.62 m).

In later years, Clegg competed in masters athletics, and set a national record in the M70 javelin in 1985.

== Death ==
A retired headmaster, Clegg died on 25 September 1991, and was buried at Ōpunake Cemetery.
