= James Lambie (rugby union) =

- Born: James Taylor Lambie; 9 April 1870 Christchurch, New Zealand
- Died: 15 April 1905 (aged 35) Manaia, New Zealand
- Height: 1.83 m (6 ft 0 in)
- Weight: 85 kg (187 lb)

Rugby union career
- Position: Forward
Amateur team(s)
Years	Team	Apps	(Points)
1889-1894	Waimate		
Provincial / State sides
Years	Team	Apps	(Points)
1889-1894	Taranaki		
International career
Years	Team	Apps	(Points)
1893-94	New Zealand	12	(12)

James Taylor Lambie (9 April 1870 – 15 April 1905) was a New Zealand rugby union player who represented the All Blacks between 1893 and 1894. His position of choice was forward. Lambie did not play in any test matches as New Zealand did not play their first until 1903.

== Career ==
Described as "short but stocky" Lambie was "well under" 1.83 metres (6 ft 0 in) tall and weighed 85 kilograms (187 lb). Out of the now-defunct Waimate club in Taranaki, Lambie was described as being a "prolific try scorer".

He first made the Taranaki provincial side in 1889 as a teenager and was a regular in the team until 1894.

He played in the trial to pick the side for the All Blacks that would tour Australia in 1893. After being selected Lambie played in every match and proved to be an outstanding player. He scored four tries.

A superb season in 1894 followed and Lambie was selected for the North Island team to play the touring Waratahs. Just two days later Lambie was also selected for the Taranaki team that also had a match on the tour. Both games were won 15-3 and 21-6 respectively. He then played in the unofficial test match for the All Blacks in Christchurch, unfortunately this game was lost 8-6.

His career ended after that game as Lambie never made another appearance at any level.

== Death ==
Lambie died aged 35 in 1905 while travelling home on Horseback after watching Taranaki play Great Britain. He was kicked in the head by his Horse suffering serious injuries.

== Family ==
His brother, W. Lambie represented Taranaki between 1895 and 1899.
