= Bernard O'Dowda =

- Full name: Bernard Clement O'Dowda
- Born: 23 March 1874 India
- Died: 26 July 1954 (aged 80) New Plymouth, New Zealand
- Height: 91 kg
- School: Christ's College, Finchley
- Occupation: Brewer / Oil driller

Rugby union career
- Position: Forward
Provincial / State sides
Years	Team	Apps	(Points)
1895–02	Taranaki		
International career
Years	Team	Apps	(Points)
1901	New Zealand		

Bernard Clement O'Dowda (23 March 1874 — 26 July 1954) was a New Zealand international rugby union player.

Born in India, O'Dowda received his education at Christ's College, a school in London. He was a forward and played his early rugby with Brighton, from where he earned Sussex representative honours.

O'Dowda immigrated to New Zealand in 1895 and two years later was called up by the All Blacks for an Australian tour, although he proved unable to make the trip. His next opportunity came in 1901 and he made two uncapped appearances for his adopted country, a practice match against Wellington and a fixture against the visiting New South Wales team.

A Taranaki player, O'Dowda was the first of three generations to play for the province, preceding son Clem and two grandchildren. He was also the father-in-law of All Black Ces Badeley.

== See also ==
- List of New Zealand national rugby union players
