= Hugh Mills (rugby union) =

- Born: Hugh Parsons Mills; 6 June 1873 Timaru, New Zealand
- Died: 26 March 1905 (aged 31) New Plymouth, New Zealand
- Weight: 83 kg (183 lb)
- Occupation: Farmer

Rugby union career
- Position: Forward
Amateur team(s)
Years	Team	Apps	(Points)
1896–99	Tukapa		
Provincial / State sides
Years	Team	Apps	(Points)
1896–99	Taranaki	12	
International career
Years	Team	Apps	(Points)
1897	New Zealand		

Hugh Parsons Mills (6 June 1873 – 26 March 1905) was a New Zealand rugby union player who represented the All Blacks in 1897. His position of choice was forward. Mills did not play in any test matches as New Zealand did not play their first until 1903.

== Career ==
Although born in Timaru, Mills played club rugby for the Tukapa club in Taranaki.

He established himself as an all-round forward, although his preferred position was wing-forward (modern day flanker).

He played 12 games for the Taranaki union between 1896 and 1899.

After playing in the inaugural North against South Island match, Mills was selected for the national side on their 11-match tour of Australia in 1897.

Mills played in eight matches on the tour, scoring four tries, which totalled 12 points.

== Personal ==
Mills was a farmer, and his wife's name was Charlotte. He died in 1905 after an illness at the age of 31, and was buried at Tataraimaka Cemetery.
