= Francis Jervis =

- Born: Francis Mahon Jervis; 26 December 1870 Auckland, New Zealand
- Died: 20 December 1952 (aged 81) Lower Hutt, New Zealand
- Weight: 73 kg (161 lb)
- School: Auckland Grammar School
- Notable relative(s): Martin Crowe (great grandson); Jeff Crowe (great grandson)
- Occupation: Bank officer

Rugby union career
- Position: Wing
Provincial / State sides
Years	Team	Apps	(Points)
1889–94	Auckland	14	
International career
Years	Team	Apps	(Points)
1893	New Zealand	0	(0)

Francis Mahon Jervis (26 December 1870 – 20 December 1952) was a New Zealand rugby union player. A wing three-quarter, Jervis represented Auckland. He was a member of the New Zealand national side on their 1893 tour of Australia, playing in 10 of the 11 matches and scoring 38 points in all, making him the highest scorer on tour.

His great-grandsons are former New Zealand cricketers, Martin and Jeff Crowe through his daughter Ngaire.
