= Paul Tito =

- Born: 9 June 1978 (age 48) Taumarunui, New Zealand
- Height: 1.98 m (6 ft 6 in)
- Weight: 110 kg (240 lb)
- School: New Plymouth Boys' High School

Rugby union career
- Position: Lock
Senior career
Years	Team	Apps	(Points)
2007-2012	Cardiff Blues	124	(15)
Provincial / State sides
Years	Team	Apps	(Points)
1998-2006	Taranaki	100	
Super Rugby
Years	Team	Apps	(Points)
1999	Chiefs	5	(0)
2000-2007	Hurricanes	84	(25)
International career
Years	Team	Apps	(Points)
1997	NZ U19		
1998-1999	NZ U21		
2000–2001, 2003	NZ Maori		

Paul Tito (born 9 June 1978) is a retired New Zealand rugby union player. He played in the lock position.

== Playing career ==
Tito attended New Plymouth Boys' High School and represented New Zealand at U19 level in 1997, U21level from 1998–1999, and the New Zealand Māori in 2000–2001 and 2003. He played for the Waikato Chiefs and Hurricanes in Super Rugby, and played for Taranaki in the Air New Zealand Cup. He played 100 games for the province.

Tito, who was out of contract at the end of the 2007 Super 14 season, bolstered the Cardiff Blues squad following that year's World Cup. On arrival in the Welsh capital he was given the job of turning the Blues failing line out around which he did with ease. He was appointed captain the following season replacing Xavier Rush who had stood down from the role. In his first season as captain he steered the region to the EDF Energy Cup Final, beating Gloucester Rugby by 50–12 on 18 April 2009 and he won the Man of the Match award for his efforts.

After a season full with injuries, Tito decided to retire at the end of the 2011/12 season.

== Coaching career ==
Tito moved into coaching and has worked with:

- the Taranaki Bulls
- Pau in France
- the Western Force
- the Wellington Lions.

He was in charge of the forwards for the Georgia national rugby union team, under head coach Levan Maisashvili, in 2022 when they beat Wales.

In December 2022 he replaced Ben Afeaki in the Auckland Blues coaching group as an assistant under Leon MacDonald. In 2024 Tito was appointed Head Coach for the New Zealand schools side.
