= Frank Brooker =

- Born: Frank Jenner Brooker; 11 October 1875 Christchurch, New Zealand
- Died: 25 July 1939 (aged 62) Khandallah, Wellington, New Zealand
- Height: 1.92 m (6 ft 4 in)
- Occupation: Public servant

Rugby union career
- Position: Siderow forward
Provincial / State sides
Years	Team	Apps	(Points)
- Canterbury
International career
Years	Team	Apps	(Points)
1897	New Zealand	0	(0)

Frank Jenner Brooker (11 October 1875 – 25 July 1939) was a New Zealand rugby union player. A siderow forward in the days of the 2-3-3 scrum formation, Brooker represented Canterbury at a provincial level. He was a member of the New Zealand national side on their 1897 tour of Australia, appearing in four matches.

Brooker died in the Wellington suburb of Khandallah on 25 July 1939, and was buried at Karori Cemetery.
