= Henry Wilson (rugby union) =

NZ international rugby union & cricket player

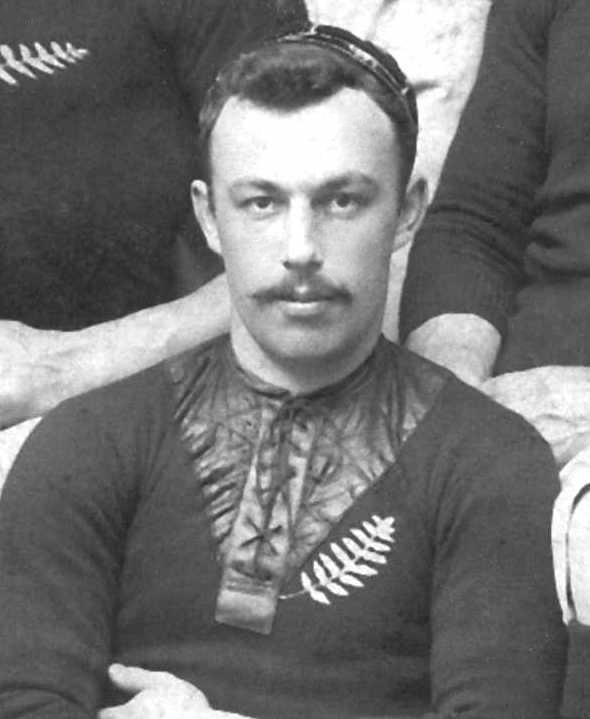
- Born: Henry Clarke Wilson; 2 February 1869 Hillend, Otago New Zealand
- Died: 16 December 1945 (aged 76) Christchurch, New Zealand
- Occupation: Accountant

Rugby union career
- Position: Fullback
Provincial / State sides
Years	Team	Apps	(Points)
1889–93, 1894	Canterbury		
1893	Manawatu	1	
-	Hawke's Bay		
International career
Years	Team	Apps	(Points)
1893	New Zealand	0	(0)
- Cricket career

Cricket information
- Bowling: Right-arm medium pace

Domestic team information
- Years: Team
- 1896/97–1900/01: Hawke's Bay
- First-class debut: 31 December 1896 Hawke's Bay v Queensland
- Last First-class: 6 April 1901 Hawke's Bay v Wellington

Career statistics
Competition	First-class
Matches	9
Runs scored	256
Batting average	21.33
100s/50s	0/0
Top score	35
Balls bowled	980
Wickets	17
Bowling average	19.64
5 wickets in innings	0
10 wickets in match	0
Best bowling	4-22
Catches/stumpings	7/0
- Source: CricketArchive, 3 February 2016

Henry Clarke Wilson (2 February 1869 – 16 December 1945) was a New Zealand rugby union player and cricketer.

== Rugby union ==
Usually a fullback, Wilson represented Canterbury, Manawatu, and Hawke's Bay at a provincial level. He and was a member of the New Zealand national side on their 1893 tour of Australia, playing in seven matches, scoring 12 points in all. He did not appear in any full internationals as New Zealand did play its first Test match until 1903.

== Cricket ==
Wilson played nine first-class matches for Hawke's Bay between 1896 and 1901. He scored 256 runs, at an average of 21.33 and a high score of 35. A right-arm medium-pace bowler, he took 17 wickets at an average of 19.64, with best bowling figures of 4 for 22.

== Death ==
Clarke died in Christchurch on 16 December 1945, and was buried at Ruru Lawn Cemetery.
