= Ray Clarke (rugby union) =

- Full name: Ray Lancelot Clarke
- Born: 7 July 1908 Warea, New Zealand
- Died: 3 June 1972 (aged 63) New Plymouth, New Zealand
- Height: 1.82 m (6 ft 0 in)
- Weight: 93 kg (205 lb)
- School: Okaiawa School

Rugby union career
- Position: Lock
International career
Years	Team	Apps	(Points)
1932	New Zealand	2	(0)

Ray Lancelot Clarke (7 July 1908 — 3 June 1972) was a New Zealand rugby union international.

Clarke was born in Warea and educated at Okaiawa School.

A sturdy lock, Clarke made his Taranaki debut aged 21 in 1929 and was capped twice by the All Blacks. He played the 2nd and 3rd Tests of the 1932 tour of Australia, replacing injured lock Dick Steere. The 1935 New Zealand Rugby Almanack named Clarke one of the "Five Players of 1934" and he was considered unfortunate to not gain further international selection.

== See also ==
- List of New Zealand national rugby union players
