= George Beatty (rugby union) =

NZ international rugby union & league player (1925-2004)

- Full name: George Edward Beatty
- Born: 29 March 1925 New Plymouth, New Zealand
- Died: 25 July 2004 (aged 79)
- Height: 170 cm (5 ft 7 in)

Rugby union career
- Position: Fly-half
International career
Years	Team	Apps	(Points)
1950	New Zealand	1	(0)
- Rugby league career

Playing information
Club
Years	Team	Pld	T	G	FG	P
1951–5?	Leigh
195?	Belle Vue Rangers
	Total	0	0	0	0	0

George Edward Beatty (29 March 1925 — 25 July 2004) was a New Zealand rugby union international.

Beatty attended New Plymouth Boys' High School and played his club rugby for New Plymouth HSOB.

A fly-half, Beatty played provincial rugby for Taranaki and was a North Island representative in 1949. He was capped once for the All Blacks, in the 1st Test against the touring 1950 British Lions at Carisbrook. The match finished in a draw and Beatty was replaced by Laurie Haig for the remaining Tests.

Beatty represented Taranaki in the Hawke Cup cricket competition.

In the early 1950s, Beatty played rugby league in England, with Leigh and Belle Vue Rangers.

== See also ==
- List of New Zealand national rugby union players
