= Hoeroa Tiopira =

- Born: 10 January 1871 Omahu, New Zealand
- Died: 1 October 1930 (aged 59) Taihape, New Zealand
- Weight: 79 kg (174 lb)
- School: Te Aute College
- Occupation: Farmer

Rugby union career
- Position: Forward
Amateur team(s)
Years	Team	Apps	(Points)
- Te Aute
–	Hawke's Bay County		
Provincial / State sides
Years	Team	Apps	(Points)
1889–93, 1895	Hawke's Bay		
International career
Years	Team	Apps	(Points)
1893	New Zealand	0	(0)

Hoeroa Tiopira (10 January 1871 – 1 October 1930) was a New Zealand rugby union player who represented his country on the 1893 tour of Australia. He did not appear in any test matches as New Zealand did not play their first test until 1903.

== Biography ==
Born on 10 January 1871 in the community of Omahu, on the outskirts of Hastings, Tiopira was educated at Meeanee School and Te Aute College.

A forward, Tiopira made his debut for Hawke's Bay in 1889, while still a student at Te Aute. His provincial career lasted until 1895.

Tiopira was selected for the New Zealand team for their tour of Australia in 1893, becoming the first player from the Hawke's Bay union to gain national honours. On that tour he played in eight matches, with a leg injury preventing him from playing more. He was commended for his leadership in contesting the ruck.

Tiopira later farmed at Waimana in the Bay of Plenty, and died at Taihape on 1 October 1930.
