= William Harris (rugby union) =

- Born: William Albert Harris; 30 June 1876 Christchurch, New Zealand
- Died: 15 June 1950 (aged 73) Dunedin, New Zealand
- Weight: 83 kg (183 lb)
- Occupation: Engineer

Rugby union career
- Position: Hooker
Amateur team(s)
Years	Team	Apps	(Points)
1894–96	Union		
Provincial / State sides
Years	Team	Apps	(Points)
1894–96	Otago	9	
International career
Years	Team	Apps	(Points)
1897	New Zealand	9	

William "Pat" Albert Harris (30 June 1876 – 15 June 1950) was a New Zealand rugby union player who represented the New Zealand national side in 1897. His position of choice was hooker. Harris did not play in any test matches as New Zealand did not play their first until 1903.

== Career ==
Harris, more commonly known as "Pat", was born in Christchurch but played for the Union (now known as Alhambra-Union due to a merge of clubs) club in Dunedin.

He played 9 games for the Otago province between 1894 and 1896. The next year, in 1897 he appeared for the South Island in the inaugural North against South Island match.

Based on this performance, Harris was chosen for the tour to Australia that year. He played in 8 out of the total 10 matches in Australia, including two out of the three of the unofficial tests against New South Wales.

After the touring party had returned to New Zealand they played a final fixture against the Auckland province. The game was lost 11–10 and at the conclusion of the match there was an after-match gathering. Unfortunately for Harris he was found guilty of being intoxicated and using coarse language. He was thus banned from participating in any rugby union for two years.

After his suspension had expired Harris did not reappear for his club or province again.

== Personal and death ==
Harris may have worked as an engineer.

Harris died on 15 June 1950 in Dunedin and was buried at Andersons Bay Cemetery.
