= Alan Good =

New Zealand international rugby union player

- Born: Alan Good; 12 July 1867 Urenui, New Zealand
- Died: 30 April 1938 (aged 70) Hāwera, New Zealand
- Weight: 79 kg (174 lb)
- School: Wanganui Collegiate
- Notable relative: Hugh Good

Rugby union career
- Position: Wing three-quarter
Provincial / State sides
| Years | Team | Apps | (Points) |
| 1887-1899 | Taranaki | 38 | |
International career
| Years | Team | Apps | (Points) |
| 1893 | New Zealand | 4 | (0) |

Alan Good (12 July 1867 – 30 April 1938) was a New Zealand rugby union player who represented the All Blacks in 1893. His position of choice was wing three-quarter. Good did not play any test matches as New Zealand did not play their first until 1903.

Good was born in Urenui and received his education at Wanganui Collegiate.

He was also an amateur athlete and in 1898 won the national amateur long jump title with a recorded jump of 19 inches and a half.

== Career ==
Good mostly played on the wing and represented his province, Taranaki 38 times between 1887 and 1899.

After appearing in an All Black trial Good was selected for the national side to tour Australia in 1893. Unfortunately injuries prevented not only Good but many of the touring party to play all ten matches and Good himself was limited to just four.

He never made another All Black appearance but was heavily involved with his provincial side.

== Personal ==
Good was also a fluent speaker of the Māori language, where he earned respect and befriended many members of the Iwis in south Taranaki

== Family ==
Good was one of 9 children to Thomas Good and Sarah Gates.

A sister, Fanny, was a botanical artist.

Two of his brothers, Harry (a forward) and Hugh (also a wing three-quarter) represented Taranaki and Hugh played for the All Blacks in 1894.

He married Emily Baker in 1889 and the pair had four known children together. He died at Hāwera on 30 April 1938 aged 70, and was survived by his wife, one son, and two daughters.
