= John Gardner (rugby union) =

- Born: John Henry Gardner; 30 January 1870 Timaru, New Zealand
- Died: 5 March 1909 (aged 39) Melbourne, Victoria, Australia
- Weight: 70 kg (150 lb)
- Occupation: Publican

Rugby union career
- Position: Loose forward
Provincial / State sides
Years	Team	Apps	(Points)
1893–94	South Canterbury		
International career
Years	Team	Apps	(Points)
1893	New Zealand	0	(0)

John Henry Gardner (30 January 1870 – 5 March 1909) was a New Zealand rugby union player. A loose forward, Gardner has the distinction of being the first player to represent the New Zealand national team before gaining provincial representation. He was a member of the New Zealand team on their 1893 tour of Australia, playing in four matches. He did not win a test cap, as New Zealand did not play its first full international match until 1903. After the tour of Australia, Gardner represented South Canterbury at a provincial level for two seasons, and captained the side in 1894.

Gardner was born in Timaru on 30 January 1870. In 1896 he took over the licence of the Sportsman's Arms Hotel at Saltwater Creek, just south of Timaru, from his father. The following year Gardner married Margaret Catherine Kennedy, and the couple had three children. In 1908 Gardner moved to Australia. He died in Melbourne Gaol on 5 March 1909 following a heavy drinking session.
