= Andy Slater (rugby union) =

New Zealand rugby union player (born 1969)

- Full name: Andrew William Slater
- Born: 21 November 1969 (age 56) New Plymouth, New Zealand
- Height: 191 cm (6 ft 3 in)
- Weight: 105 kg (231 lb)
- School: New Plymouth Boys' High School
- Notable relative(s): Gordon Slater (brother); Bradley Slater (son)
- Occupation: Dairy farmer

Rugby union career
- Position: Back-row / Lock
Provincial / State sides
Years	Team	Apps	(Points)
1989–01	Taranaki	180	(138)
Super Rugby
Years	Team	Apps	(Points)
2001	Hurricanes	1	(0)

Andrew William Slater (born 21 November 1969) is a New Zealand former rugby union player.

== Biography ==
Slater was educated at New Plymouth Boys' High School and is dairy farmer by profession.

A forward, Slater often played in the back-row early in his career, but was later solely a lock. He spent his entire provincial career with Taranaki, where he debuted in 1989 as a 19-year-old. In 1996, Slater captained the Taranaki side which claimed the Ranfurly Shield off Auckland. He was NPC 1st Division Player of the Year in 2000 and the following season made a belated debut for the Hurricanes as a substitute against the Blues at Eden Park. Forced to retire in 2002 due to a heart condition, Slater ended with 180 provincial appearances, bettered by only Ian Eliason amongst Taranaki forwards.

Slater is the elder brother of All Black Gordon Slater and father of Chiefs player Bradley Slater.
