= Lewis Allen (rugby union) =

New Zealand rugby union player (1870–1932)

- Born: Louis Allen; 30 October 1870 New Plymouth, New Zealand
- Died: 17 October 1932 (aged 61) Nelson, New Zealand
- Weight: 76 kg (168 lb)
- Occupation: Rugby Union Player

Rugby union career
- Position: Centre, five-eighth
Provincial / State sides
Years	Team	Apps	(Points)
1893–1903	Taranaki	40	(51)
1905	Manawatu	1	
International career
Years	Team	Apps	(Points)
1896–1901	New Zealand	0	(0)

Louis Allen (30 October 1870 – 17 October 1932) was a New Zealand rugby union player. A centre and five-eighth, Allen represented Taranaki and, briefly, Manawatu at a provincial level. He was a member of the New Zealand national side between 1896 and 1901, appearing in 13 matches, but no test matches as New Zealand did not play its first full international until 1903. Lewis died in Nelson in 1932, and was buried at Wakapuaka Cemetery.
