= Maurice Cockerill =

New Zealand rugby union player

- Born: Maurice Stanley Cockerill; 8 December 1928 Hāwera, New Zealand
- Died: 5 August 2024 (aged 95) Hastings, New Zealand
- Height: 1.80 m (5 ft 11 in)
- Weight: 77 kg (170 lb)
- School: Hawera Technical College

Rugby union career
- Position: Fullback
Amateur team(s)
Years	Team	Apps	(Points)
- Hawera Athletic
Provincial / State sides
Years	Team	Apps	(Points)
1949–51	Taranaki		
International career
Years	Team	Apps	(Points)
1951	New Zealand	3	(11)

Maurice Stanley Cockerill (8 December 1928 – 5 August 2024) was a New Zealand rugby union player. A fullback, Cockerill represented Taranaki at a provincial level, and was a member of the New Zealand national side, the All Blacks, in 1951. He played 11 matches for the All Blacks including three internationals, but a serious knee injury suffered while playing for Taranaki in a game against Waikato later in 1951 ended his rugby career.

Cockerill was educated at Hawera Technical College, where he was a member of the 1st XV between 1943 and 1946. He was also Taranaki cricket representative.

Cockerill died in Hastings on 5 August 2024, at the age of 95.
