= Wiremu Kīngi Moki Te Matakātea =

- Born: Moki; New Zealand
- Died: 14 February 1893; New Zealand
- Other names: Te Matakātea, William King
- Occupation(s): Tribal leader and warrior

Wiremu Kīngi Moki Te Matakātea (died 14 February 1893) was a principal chief and warrior of the Ngāti Haumiti hapū (subtribe) of the Māori iwi (tribe) of New Zealand known as Taranaki.

Born probably in the Taranaki region in the early years of the nineteenth century, Te Matakātea was first known as Moki. In the 1820s and 1830s he was caught up in his tribe's resistance to a series of Waikato raids. After a Waikato victory at Maru, at the base of Mount Taranaki, in 1826, he became the leader of some 120 men and their families who stayed within the protection of Te Namu pa, near Ōpunake, when the remainder of the Taranaki tribe migrated to the Kapiti coast about 1827. Moki and his people were able to obtain muskets from European flax traders who had settled at Ngamotu, near present-day New Plymouth, in 1828. When in 1833 Waikato laid siege to Te Namu, Moki distinguished himself by his marksmanship and received the name Te Matakātea, the clear-eyed. Waikato retreated but, sensing that this was only a temporary reprieve, Te Matakātea led his people a few miles south to a complex of three pa at the mouth of the Kapuni Stream, in the territory of his Ngāti Ruanui relatives. When the Waikato returned in 1836, Te Matakātea gathered Ngāti Ruanui, including his cousin Wiremu Hukunui Manaia, and successfully fought off the Waikato. Then in 1840, he was one of the leaders of the Taranaki tribes who assisted Ngā Rauru to fight off Iwikau Te Heuheu Tūkino III and Ngāti Tūwharetoa.

Te Matakātea was baptised a Christian on 24 October 1841, taking the name Wiremu Kīngi (William King).
