= George Harper (rugby union) =

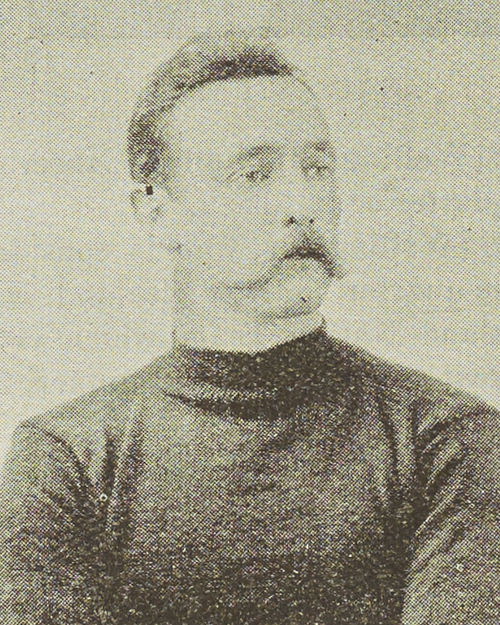
- Born: 19 August 1867 Nelson, New Zealand
- Died: 7 June 1937 (aged 69) Paeroa, New Zealand
- Weight: 73 kg (161 lb)
- School: Nelson College
- Occupation: Farmer

Rugby union career
- Position: Three-quarter
Provincial / State sides
Years	Team	Apps	(Points)
1886–95	Nelson		
International career
Years	Team	Apps	(Points)
1893	New Zealand	0	(0)

George Harper (19 August 1867 – 7 June 1937) was a New Zealand rugby union player. A three-quarter, Harper represented Nelson at a provincial level, and was a member of the New Zealand national side, the All Blacks, on the 1893 tour to Australia. He played three matches for the All Blacks, but did not play in an international.

Harper was educated at Nelson College from 1882 to 1885. He died suddenly in 1937 after boarding a train at Paeroa station.
