= Stratford High School, New Zealand =

Stratford High School

Location
- Swansea Road, Stratford, New Zealand; 39.3402°S 174.2970°E

Information
- Type: State co-educational secondary (Year 9–13)
- Motto: Palma non sine pulvere No reward without effort
- Established: 1897
- Ministry of Education Institution no.: 179
- Principal: Cameron Stone
- Enrolment: 701 (July 2026)
- Socio-economic decile: 4L
- Website: stratfordhigh.school.nz

Stratford High School is a secondary school in Stratford, Taranaki, New Zealand. It is the only co-educational high school in the Stratford District.

== History ==
Stratford District High School was established in 1897. Between 1922 and 1966, the school operated as Stratford Technical High School, and since 1966, it has been known as Stratford High School.

== Background ==
The school uniform is a white shirt, red jersey and black shorts/trousers for seniors or a black shirt, Black and red jersey and grey shorts/skirts for juniors, plus black shoes.

Stratford High School consists of four houses, Amess (red), McAllister (yellow), Trimble (green) and Tyrer (blue).

Although being considered a small school, Stratford High participates in many extra-curricular programs, including a school production, participation in the Smokefree Stage Challenge, many sports teams, cross-country, athletics and swimming sports events, and many art and culture events.

Stratford High School has a prominently strong Kapa Haka group that are involved in local competitions in the region. Having introduced the school haka in 2011, it is used in welcoming and sporting events. Students are involved in a wide range of musical activities such as the Variety concert and the annual Stratford Lion's Awards.

== Notable alumni ==
- Mark "Bull" Allen (born 1967), Hurricanes and All Black (1993–97) rugby union player, TV celebrity
- Donald Cameron (1887–1947), All Black (1908) rugby union player
- Alice Copping (1906 – 1996) senior lecturer in nutrition, Queen Elizabeth College, University of London.
- Brian Davis (1934–1998), Anglican bishop
- Gavin Hill (born 1965), rugby union and rugby league player
- Alfred Kivell (1897–1987), All Black (1929) rugby union player
- John McCullough (born 1936), All Black rugby union player (1959)
- Harold Masters (1895–1980), All Black (1922) rugby union player
- Alan Smith All Black rugby union player (1967–70)
- Ronald Syme, historian and classicist (1903–1989)
- Jeremiah Trueman (born 1987), basketball player
- Roger Urbahn (1934–84), All Black rugby union player (1959–60)
- Murray Watts (born 1955), All Black (1979–80) rugby union player
- Toss Woollaston (1910–1998), painter
- Stephen Cox (born 1956), New Zealand Olympic Cyclist
