= Harold Masters =

- Born: Frederick Harold Masters; 20 December 1895 Brunnerton, New Zealand
- Died: 27 May 1980 (aged 84) Sydney, New South Wales, Australia
- Height: 1.82 m (5 ft 11 3/4 in)
- Weight: 97 kg (214 lb)
- School: Stratford High School

Rugby union career
- Position: Lock
Provincial / State sides
Years	Team	Apps	(Points)
1919–22	Taranaki	27	
International career
Years	Team	Apps	(Points)
1922	New Zealand	0	(0)

Frederick Harold Masters MM (20 December 1895 – 27 May 1980) was a New Zealand rugby union player. A lock, Masters represented Taranaki at a provincial level, and was a member of the New Zealand national side, the All Blacks, in 1922. He played four matches for the All Blacks, but did not make any Test appearances. He went on to serve as a Taranaki selector during the 1930s, and was a national selector from 1936 to 1937. Masters moved to Australia in 1938 and was a New South Wales and Australian national selector in 1946 and 1947.

Masters enlisted in August 1914, shortly after the outbreak of World War I, and served in the Divisional Signal Company, New Zealand Engineers, for most of the war, rising to the rank of sergeant. He saw action at Gallipoli, where he was twice wounded. In 1916 he was mentioned in dispatches for distinguished and gallant services during the period of General Sir Charles Monro's command of the Mediterranean Expeditionary Force. In June 1917 Masters was severely wounded at Messines, and was awarded the Military Medal for acts of gallantry in the field. He returned to New Zealand in early 1918 and was discharged from the army as he was no longer fit for active service because of wounds received in action.
