= Roger Urbahn =

New Zealand rugby union player, cricketer, and sports journalist

- Born: Roger James Urbahn; 31 July 1934 Ōpunake, New Zealand
- Died: 27 November 1984 (aged 50) New Plymouth, New Zealand
- Height: 1.74 m (5 ft 9 in)
- Weight: 61 kg (134 lb)
- School: Stratford Technical High School
- University: Ardmore Teachers' Training College
- Occupation(s): School teacher, journalist

Rugby union career
- Position: Halfback
Provincial / State sides
Years	Team	Apps	(Points)
1955–66	Taranaki		
International career
Years	Team	Apps	(Points)
1959–60	New Zealand	3	(3)

Roger James Urbahn (31 July 1934 – 27 November 1984) was a New Zealand rugby union player, cricketer, and sports journalist.

A halfback, Urbahn played representative rugby for Taranaki at a provincial level between 1955 and 1966. He was a member of the New Zealand national side, the All Blacks, in 1959 and 1960, playing 15 matches including three internationals. In all he scored three tries for the All Blacks. An all-round sportsman, Urbahn also played Hawke Cup cricket for Taranaki. He trained as a school teacher at Ardmore Teachers' Training College and worked in that profession until 1962, when he became a journalist, rising to become sports editor of the Taranaki Daily News. Urbahn died in New Plymouth on 27 November 1984.
