= Tony Penn =

- Full name: Anthony Wayne Penn
- Born: 11 July 1978 (age 48) New Plymouth, New Zealand
- Height: 6 ft 1 in (185 cm)
- Weight: 242 lb (110 kg)

Rugby union career
- Position: Prop
Provincial / State sides
Years	Team	Apps	(Points)
1999–09	Taranaki	117	(65)
Super Rugby
Years	Team	Apps	(Points)
2001–07	Hurricanes	27	(0)
Coaching career
- Years: Team
- Guam

Anthony Wayne Penn (born 11 July 1978) is a New Zealand former professional rugby union player.

== Early years ==
Penn was born in New Plymouth and educated at Francis Douglas Memorial College, where he partnered future Fiji international Deacon Manu in the front-row of the 1st XV. He represented New Zealand at under-19 and under-21 level.

== Rugby career ==
A loosehead prop, Penn was a NZ Maori representative and played his club rugby for Tukapa. He got called up by the Hurricanes from Taranaki for the final round of the 2001 Super 12 season and was a regular in the XV over the next two campaigns, with further intermittent appearances until 2007. Before retiring in 2009, Penn had three seasons captaining Taranaki. He later became head coach of Guam and guided them to their highest ever World Rugby ranking.

== Personal life ==
Penn is now based in Pocklington, East Yorkshire.
