= Opunake High School =

- Te Kura Tuarua o Opunake

Location
- Tasman Street, Ōpunake, Taranaki 4616, New Zealand; 39.4507°S 173.8523°E

Information
- Type: State & Day
- Motto: Ut prosim patriae "That I may be worthy of my country."
- Established: 1925
- Ministry of Education Institution no.: 181
- Principal: Andrea Hooper
- Years: 9–13
- Gender: Coeducational
- Enrolment: 318 (July 2026)
- Colours: Blue & Yellow
- Socio-economic decile: 4L
- Website: opunake.school.nz

Opunake High School is a state secondary school for years 9 to 13 boys and girls in Ōpunake, New Zealand. It has a roll of 319 as of November 2015, the school crest features the Cape Egmont Lighthouse, open book and the torch of the spirit, and Mt Taranaki the motto "Ut prosim patriae" which translates to "that I may be worthy of my country". The school colours are blue and yellow. Most of the school's approximately 319 students are from Ōpunake and surrounding townships such as Manaia, Kaponga, and Rahotu.

During a Saturday night, early October 1982, all but one block had burnt down, thus the school had all but two classrooms rebuilt. It is not known how the school burnt down, but it is believed that it was caused by arson.

== Houses ==
Opunake High School currently has four houses, which they call hapu.

- Awhina - black
- Karo - green
- Rimu - red
- Totara - blue

== Academic ==
The school offers the state run NCEA for students to undertake.

== Badge ==
When Opunake High School was translated to a full post-primary school, it was evident that a new badge would have to be designed to replace the Opunake District High School (O.D.H.S.) badge which had served the school so well for thirty years. The Committee of Management, Staff and pupils set about the task with enthusiasm and many and varied were drawings presented.

Finally from the drawings and suggestions made by Mr. Gifford, the school's art master, and by Mr. J. England, a member of the staff, a preliminary draft of the badge was made and after some modifications suggested by the committee, the final design was approved.

The shield of the badge is now divided into three sections. In the lowest section appears Mount Taranaki, symbolic of the province. It is noteworthy, however, that this is the Ōpunake view of the mountain with Fantham's peak on the right. In the left section of the badge appears Cape Egmont Lighthouse which is symbolic of the coastal part of the province which the School serves. It may also, however, be regarded as a symbol of the shedding of the light of knowledge to all those who come within the influence of the school.

The open book and the torch of the spirit occupy the right section of the badge. The open book is, of course, the symbol of the wealth of knowledge which can be revealed and explained to all those who pass through the school; it is also symbolic of that free access to all sources of information and that right of free expression which we as people of a democratic country should value highly.

The torch of the spirit is not easily explained. It stands for those intangible aspirations and standards of value which should be inculcated in every good post-primary school. A boy or girl who leaves the school should carry away something more than knowledge and developed skills, he or she should have become a better person through contact with the finest that literature, art, music and religion can offer.

== Sport ==
Opunake High School fields a number of sports teams in a variety of codes. In recent years it has won the New Zealand and Australian secondary school competition for the Sir Edmund Hillary Challenge. Its basketball and surfing are often their strengths, being one of the best in New Zealand.

Opunake High School competes regularly against Manawatū College in Foxton. Known as the 'Manawatu Exchange' or the 'Opunake Exchange' the two schools are traditional foes, and games between them generate intense but good-natured rivalry. The exchange started in 1965.

== Notable alumni ==
- Shane Ardern - Member of Parliament
- Jim Bolger - former Prime Minister of New Zealand, and former NZ Ambassador to the United States of America
- Ian Eliason - former All Black
- Graham Mourie - former All Black Captain
- Mahara Okeroa - Member of Parliament
- Mark Robinson - former All Black
