= Bryce Robins (rugby union, born 1980) =

Japan international rugby union player

- Born: Bryce B. Robins; 19 September 1980 (age 46) New Plymouth, New Zealand
- Height: 1.83 m (6 ft 0 in)
- Weight: 95 kg (209 lb)
- Occupation: Rugby union player

Rugby union career
- Position: Centre
Senior career
Years	Team	Apps	(Points)
2004–08	Ricoh Black Rams	36	(62)
2008–11	NEC Green Rockets	41	(128)
2011–13	Honda Heat	15	(40)
2013–18	Munakata Sanix Blues	36	(55)
2022	NTT Communications Shining Arcs	2	(0)
- Correct as of 15 January 2017
Super Rugby
Years	Team	Apps	(Points)
2002–03	Hurricanes	4	(5)
International career
Years	Team	Apps	(Points)
2003	New Zealand Māori		
2007–	Japan	25	(72)
- Correct as of 31 October 2011

Bryce B. Robins (born 19 September 1980) is a New Zealand-born Japanese rugby union player who plays as a centre for the Munakata Sanix Blues in the Top League and Japan. He played for the Hurricanes in 2002 and 2003.

On 22 April 2007, Robins made his international debut for Japan against Korea where they won 82–0. Robin was named as part of the Japan squad for the 2007 Rugby World Cup by coach John Kirwan.

In 2003 he also made the New Zealand Māori team to play Tonga, England and Canada, scoring a try in his sole start playing at second five-eighth in their win against the Canadian All Stars.

Robins is the son of 1985 All Black Bryce Robins, a wing who toured with the All Blacks to Argentina in 1985 after initially being selected for the aborted tour of South Africa earlier the same year.
