= Joseph Calnan =

- Born: 24 June 1876 Wellington, New Zealand
- Died: 31 December 1947 (aged 71) Wellington, New Zealand
- Weight: 79 kg (174 lb; 12 st 6 lb)
- Occupation: Council worker

Rugby union career
- Position: Loose forward
Amateur team(s)
| Years | Team | Apps | (Points) |
| 1895–97, 99–1900, 03–04, 06 | Melrose | | |
Provincial / State sides
| Years | Team | Apps | (Points) |
| 1895–97, 99–1900, 03–04, 06 | Wellington | 40 | |
International career
| Years | Team | Apps | (Points) |
| 1897 | New Zealand | 9 | (8) |

Joseph Calnan (24 June 1876 – 31 December 1947) was a New Zealand rugby union player who represented the New Zealand national side in 1897. His position of choice was loose forward. Calnan did not play in any test matches as New Zealand did not play their first until 1903.

== Career ==
Out of the Melrose club, Calnan made his debut for the Wellington provincial team as a nineteen-year old, in 1895.

He played for the North Island in the inter-island match in 1897. Based on his performance he was then selected for the tour of Australia that year.

In his eight games on tour he scored 2 tries and converted one of those in the game against Central-Western Districts.

Unfortunately his career took a turn for the worse as he was accused of using coarse language and being intoxicated at an after-match gathering at the conclusion of the Auckland game, once the touring party had returned to New Zealand. He was thus banned from participating in any rugby union for two years.

After serving his suspension he returned to provincial rugby and was a part of the Wellington team that won the Ranfurly Shield for the first time in the existence of the trophy, after defeating Auckland 6-4, on 6 August 1904.

At the end of 1904 a list was released for possible candidates for the famous Original All Blacks tour the following year. Calnan was not included and local supporters in Wellington were unhappy with this. The Wellington union did nothing to contest and Calnan played one more game for the province, in 1906.

== Personal and family ==
Calnan may have been employed at the Wellington City Council and at one point was also a successful rugby union referee. He married Margaret Ann Gott on 29 November 1905, and they had one son. He died on 31 December 1947 in Wellington.
