= Bryce Robins (rugby union, born 1958) =

NZ rugby union player

- Born: Bryce Graeme Robins; 12 December 1958 (age 67) Eltham, New Zealand
- Height: 1.75 m (5 ft 9 in)
- Weight: 86 kg (190 lb)
- School: New Plymouth Boys' High School
- Notable relative: Bryce Robins (son)

Rugby union career
- Position: Wing
Provincial / State sides
Years	Team	Apps	(Points)
1980–92	Taranaki	149	
International career
Years	Team	Apps	(Points)
1985	New Zealand	0	(0)

Bryce Graeme Robins (born 12 December 1958) is a former New Zealand rugby union player. A wing, Robins represented Taranaki at a provincial level, and was a member of the New Zealand national side, the All Blacks, on the 1985 tour of Argentina. He played four matches on that tour but did not appear in any internationals.
