= Ian Eliason =

New Zealand rugby union player (1945–2019)

- Born: Ian Matheson Eliason; 6 June 1945 Kaponga, New Zealand
- Died: 24 February 2019 (aged 73) New Plymouth, New Zealand
- Height: 1.90 m (6 ft 3 in)
- Weight: 100 kg (220 lb)
- School: Opunake High School

Rugby union career
- Position: Lock
Provincial / State sides
Years	Team	Apps	(Points)
1964–81	Taranaki	222	
International career
Years	Team	Apps	(Points)
1972–73	New Zealand	0	(0)

Ian Matheson Eliason (6 June 1945 – 24 February 2019) was a New Zealand rugby union player. A lock, Eliason represented Taranaki at a provincial level, and was a member of the New Zealand national side, the All Blacks, from 1972 to 1973. He played 19 games for the All Blacks but did not appear in any test matches. He was the first All Black to come from the Kaponga club and played a record 222 provincial matches.

Eliason, known widely as 'Legs' died in New Plymouth on 24 February 2019.

== Awards and appointments ==
Eliason was made a life member of the Taranaki Rugby Football Union in 1981 and also went on to serve as President, Vice-President and Patron. He was posthumously inducted into the Taranaki Sports Hall of Fame in November 2025.

At the time of his induction former Taranaki teammates Graham Mourie and John Thwaites said he was a highly respected figure in Taranaki rugby.

“He’s a great bloke. He was good with the young players when they first came into to the team. He made them feel part of the team, but he was a great guy sharing his friendship with all the players and making them feel needed.” Thwaites said.
