= Billy Watson (rugby union) =

- Born: William Donald Watson; 22 December 1869 Eketāhuna, New Zealand
- Died: 25 March 1953 (aged 83) Masterton, New Zealand
- Occupation: Drover

Rugby union career
- Position: Forward
Provincial / State sides
Years	Team	Apps	(Points)
1889–99	Wairarapa	24	
International career
Years	Team	Apps	(Points)
1893, 1896	New Zealand	0	(0)

William Donald Watson (22 December 1869 – 25 March 1953) was a New Zealand rugby union player. A forward, Watson represented Wairarapa at a provincial level, and was a member of the New Zealand national side in 1893 and 1896. He played three matches for New Zealand, including matches against New South Wales and Queensland, but did not appear in any Test matches as New Zealand did not play its first full international until 1903.

Later in his life, Watson was a judge at sheepdog trials. He died at Masterton on 25 March 1953, and was buried at the Archer Street Cemetery.
