= Arthur Humphries =

- Born: Arthur Larwill Humphries; 15 February 1874 New Plymouth, New Zealand
- Died: 13 April 1953 (aged 79) Whanganui, New Zealand
- Weight: 59 kg (130 lb)

Rugby union career
- Position: Halfback
Provincial / State sides
Years	Team	Apps	(Points)
1893–1903	Taranaki	40	
International career
Years	Team	Apps	(Points)
1897–1903	New Zealand	0	(0)

Arthur Larwill Humphries (15 February 1874 – 13 April 1953) was a New Zealand rugby union player. Primarily a halfback, Humphries represented Taranaki at a provincial level between 1893 and 1903, playing 40 matches for the province. He was a member of the New Zealand national side in 1897, 1901, and 1903. In all, he made 15 appearances for his country, scoring 45 points, but missed selection for New Zealand's first Test match, against Australia in 1903. He went on to be the manager of the national side, by then known as the All Blacks, against the touring Anglo-Welsh side in 1908, and later served as a Taranaki selector and, in 1923, as president of the Taranaki Rugby Union.

Humphries died in Whanganui on 13 April 1953, and his ashes were buried at Aramoho Cemetery.
