= Gordon Slater (rugby union) =

NZ international rugby union player

- Born: 21 November 1971 (age 54) New Plymouth
- Height: 1.88 m (6 ft 2 in)
- Weight: 112 kg (247 lb)
- School: New Plymouth Boys' High School

Rugby union career
- Position: Prop
International career
Years	Team	Apps	(Points)
1997-2000	New Zealand	6	(5)

Gordon Leonard Slater (born in New Plymouth, 21 November 1971) is a New Zealand former rugby union footballer. He is recorded as All Black number 968.

== Career ==
Slater, played in 174 matches for Taranaki after making his debut as a 19 year old in 1991. He was in the 1988 and 1989 New Zealand national schoolboy rugby union team. He also played for the New Zealand Colts (1991 and 1992), the New Zealand Divisional team (1993) and the Hurricanes for 56 games, including many as the captain. He also played for the New Zealand Development Team in 1994 and New Zealand A team in 1998 and 1999.

Slater made his debut for the All Blacks on their 1997 end of season tour. He played against Wales 'A' at Pontypridd (a 51–8 win), Emerging England at Huddersfield (59–22) and England 'A' at Leicester (30–19).

His international appearances were limited due to the presence of players such as Olo Brown, Kees Meeuws and Greg Somerville. He next played on the 2000 end of year tour and played in test matches against France at Paris (39–26 win) and at Marseille (scoring a try in the 33–42 loss) and versus Italy at Genova (56–19).

He continued to appear for Taranaki until the 2005 season and upon retirement had played 263 first class games.

Although playing in the professional rugby environment Gordon was also a dairy farmer.

== Personal life ==
His elder brother, Andy Slater, also played for the New Plymouth Old Boys club and Taranaki as a lock or flanker (180 games from 1989 to 2001). Andy was the First division player of the year in 2000 and had an appearance as a substitute for the Hurricanes in 2001.
