= Alfred Kivell =

- Born: Alfred Louis Kivell; 12 April 1897
- Died: 1 September 1987 (aged 90) Stratford, New Zealand
- Height: 1.75 m (5 ft 9 in)
- Weight: 83 kg (183 lb)
- School: Stratford High School

Rugby union career
- Position: Loose forward
Provincial / State sides
Years	Team	Apps	(Points)
1920–30	Taranaki	64	
International career
Years	Team	Apps	(Points)
1929	New Zealand	2	(0)

Alfred Louis Kivell (12 April 1897 – 1 September 1987) was a New Zealand rugby union player. A loose forward, Kivell represented Taranaki at a provincial level between 1920 and 1930. He was a member of the New Zealand national side, the All Blacks, on their 1929 tour of Australia, playing in five matches including two internationals.

Sources vary as to Kivell's place of birth: either Tararu, near Thames; or Karangahake, near Paeroa. Kivell enlisted as a rifleman in the New Zealand Rifle Brigade in March 1917, and served with the New Zealand Expeditionary Force in France in the last months of World War I. He died on 1 September 1987.
