= Matapu =

- Interactive map of Matapu
- Coordinates: 39°28′47″S 174°13′38″E
- Country: New Zealand
- Region: Taranaki
- District: South Taranaki District
- Ward: Eltham-Kaponga General Ward; Te Kūrae Māori Ward
- Community: Eltham-Kaponga Community
- Electorates: Whanganui; Te Tai Hauāuru (Māori)

Government
  - Territorial Authority: South Taranaki District Council
  - Regional council: Taranaki Regional Council
  - Mayor of South Taranaki: Phil Nixon
  - Whanganui MP: Carl Bates
  - Te Tai Hauāuru MP: Debbie Ngarewa-Packer

Area
  - Total: 21.28 km^{2} (8.22 sq mi)

Population (2023 census)
  - Total: 120
  - Density: 5.6/km^{2} (15/sq mi)

Matapu is a locality located in South Taranaki District within the southern Taranaki Region of New Zealand. Hāwera is to the south-east, Eltham to the north-east, Kaponga to the north-west and Manaia to the south-west.

== Demographics ==
Matapu locality covers 21.28 km^{2} (8.22 sq mi). The locality is part of the larger Okaiawa statistical area.

Historical population
Year	Pop.	±% p.a.
2006	147	—
2013	120	−2.86%
2018	120	+0.00%
2023	120	+0.00%

Matapu had a population of 120 in the 2023 New Zealand census, unchanged since the 2018 census, and unchanged since the 2013 census. There were 63 males and 57 females in 39 dwellings. 2.5% of people identified as LGBTIQ+. The median age was 32.2 years (compared with 38.1 years nationally). There were 36 people (30.0%) aged under 15 years, 24 (20.0%) aged 15 to 29, 48 (40.0%) aged 30 to 64, and 15 (12.5%) aged 65 or older.

People could identify as more than one ethnicity. The results were 77.5% European (Pākehā), 37.5% Māori, and 5.0% other, which includes people giving their ethnicity as "New Zealander". English was spoken by 95.0%, Māori by 10.0%, and other languages by 5.0%. No language could be spoken by 5.0% (e.g. too young to talk). The percentage of people born overseas was 5.0, compared with 28.8% nationally.

Religious affiliations were 22.5% Christian, 5.0% Hindu, and 5.0% Māori religious beliefs. People who answered that they had no religion were 55.0%, and 12.5% of people did not answer the census question.

Of those at least 15 years old, 6 (7.1%) people had a bachelor's or higher degree, 48 (57.1%) had a post-high school certificate or diploma, and 33 (39.3%) people exclusively held high school qualifications. The median income was $40,600, compared with $41,500 nationally. 6 people (7.1%) earned over $100,000 compared to 12.1% nationally. The employment status of those at least 15 was 48 (57.1%) full-time and 12 (14.3%) part-time.

== Marae ==
Matapu has three marae, associated with Ngāruahine hapū.

- Aotearoa Marae and its Ngākaunui are affiliated with Ōkahu-Inuāwai.
- Te Aroha o Tītokowaru Marae and Te Aroha meeting house belong to Ngāti Manuhiakai.
- Kanihi or Māwhitiwhiti Marae and Kanihi meeting house are affiliated with Kanihi-Umutahi.

In October 2020, the Government committed $1,259,392 from the Provincial Growth Fund to upgrade Aotearoa Marae and 7 other Ngāti Raukawa marae, creating 18 jobs.

== Education ==
Matapu School is a coeducational full primary (years 1–8) school with a decile rating of 7 and a roll of 75. In 2005, Okaiawa and Mangatoki Schools closed and merged with Matapu School.
