= Frederick Murray (rugby union) =

- Born: Frederick Steele Miller Murray; 20 August 1871 Mahurangi, New Zealand
- Died: 5 August 1952 (aged 80) Auckland, New Zealand
- Weight: 84 kg (185 lb)

Rugby union career
- Position: Forward
Provincial / State sides
Years	Team	Apps	(Points)
1891–1899	Auckland	26	
International career
Years	Team	Apps	(Points)
1893–1897	New Zealand	0	(0)

Frederick Steele Miller Murray (20 August 1871 – 5 August 1952) was a New Zealand rugby union player. A forward, Murray represented Auckland at a provincial level, and was a member of the New Zealand national side in 1893 and 1897. He played 20 matches for New Zealand, but did not appear in any internationals as New Zealand did not play its first Test match until 1903.
