= Okaiawa =

Rural community in South Taranaki, New Zealand

- Interactive map of Okaiawa
- Coordinates: 39.528°S 174.200°E
- Country: New Zealand
- Region: Taranaki Region
- Territorial authority: South Taranaki District
- Ward: Te Hāwera General Ward; Te Kūrae Māori Ward
- Community: Te Hāwera Community
- Electorates: Whanganui; Te Tai Hauāuru (Māori)

Government
  - Territorial Authority: South Taranaki District Council
  - Regional council: Taranaki Regional Council
  - Mayor of South Taranaki: Phil Nixon
  - Whanganui MP: Carl Bates
  - Te Tai Hauāuru MP: Debbie Ngarewa-Packer

Area
  - Total: 40.87 km^{2} (15.78 sq mi)

Population (2023 census)
  - Total: 427
  - Density: 10.4/km^{2} (27.1/sq mi)
- Postcode: 4671

Okaiawa or Ōkaiawa is a rural community in South Taranaki, New Zealand. It is located about 14 kilometres north-west of Hāwera, north of State Highway 45 and State Highway 3. The settlement is located south-east of Mount Taranaki, close to Inaka River.

According to the New Zealand Ministry for Culture and Heritage, Okaiawa translates as 'place of food'. Ō means 'place of'; kai means 'food'; and awa means 'river' or 'valley'.

== History ==
=== 19th century ===
Frank Bremer, a Taranaki farmer originally from Adelaide, purchased a property in Okaiawa in 1890. His farm covered 284 acres of freehold land and 316 of leasehold land. He became a breeder of high-class draught horses which won several races, was president of the local racing club, and milked about 100 cows.

In the 1880s, Thomas Joll established a chain of private dairy factories, based in Okaiawa. He opened a creamery three kilometres from the settlement in 1894. The chain became a cooperative when Joll died in 1908, and Joll was commemorated with a marble bust at the local park named in his honour.

By 1908, the township had a hotel, a store, a butchery, and electricity. The farming community was growing, and the school roll was averaging about 92 children. A Māori Methodist minister was living in the township.

=== 20th century ===
Eleven local men died in World War I and dozens of others served in the war. A roll of honour was unveiled at the school in 1919 for two ex-pupils who died and 39 other ex-pupils who served. Another roll of honour was unveiled at the local St Aidan's Anglican Church the following year. A memorial statue was unveiled at Joll Park on Anzac Day 1922 for the town's fallen soldiers. An individual memorial was erected at Okaiawa Cemetery for Frank Williams, one of the men who died.

By 1922, 198 students were enrolled in Okaiawa School. At an annual school picnic, parents were reminded to send their children to school "regularly" to keep attendance high.

Three local men died in World War II, and 52 others served in the war. A memorial feature on a brick feature at the school pool was unveiled by Minister of Internal Affairs William Bodkin on 10 March 1952, listing all the men's names.

Okaiawa School celebrated its 75th Jubilee in 1958. By this stage, many students were travelling to Manaia High School for secondary education.

=== 21st century ===
The New Zealand Government proposed merging Okaiawa School with Manaia School in 2004. Okaiawa School closed permanently in 2009. The World War II plaque at the school was moved to a new wall of river stones at Okaiawa Cemetery in 2009. The location of the school's World War I memorial is unknown.

== Demographics ==
Okaiawa locality covers 40.87 km^{2} (15.78 sq mi). The locality is part of the larger Okaiawa statistical area.

Historical population of Okaiawa locality
| Year | Pop. | ±% p.a. |
|---|---|---|
| 2006 | 441 | — |
| 2013 | 423 | −0.59% |
| 2018 | 411 | −0.57% |
| 2023 | 426 | +0.72% |

Okaiawa had a population of 426 in the 2023 New Zealand census, an increase of 15 people (3.6%) since the 2018 census, and an increase of 3 people (0.7%) since the 2013 census. There were 216 males, 204 females, and 3 people of other genders in 162 dwellings. 2.8% of people identified as LGBTIQ+. There were 69 people (16.2%) aged under 15 years, 78 (18.3%) aged 15 to 29, 216 (50.7%) aged 30 to 64, and 66 (15.5%) aged 65 or older.

People could identify as more than one ethnicity. The results were 85.2% European (Pākehā), 23.2% Māori, 0.7% Pasifika, 2.8% Asian, and 2.8% other, which includes people giving their ethnicity as "New Zealander". English was spoken by 99.3%, Māori by 4.2%, and other languages by 2.8%. The percentage of people born overseas was 9.2, compared with 28.8% nationally.

Religious affiliations were 31.7% Christian, 0.7% New Age, and 2.1% other religions. People who answered that they had no religion were 53.5%, and 12.0% of people did not answer the census question.

Of those at least 15 years old, 36 (10.1%) people had a bachelor's or higher degree, 213 (59.7%) had a post-high school certificate or diploma, and 108 (30.3%) people exclusively held high school qualifications. 27 people (7.6%) earned over $100,000 compared to 12.1% nationally. The employment status of those at least 15 was 195 (54.6%) full-time, 57 (16.0%) part-time, and 12 (3.4%) unemployed.

=== Okaiawa statistical area ===
Okaiawa statistical area, which also includes Ohawe, covers 102.14 km^{2} (39.44 sq mi) and had an estimated population of 1,340 as of June 2025, with a population density of 13 people per km^{2}.

Historical population for the statistical area
| Year | Pop. | ±% p.a. |
|---|---|---|
| 2006 | 1,167 | — |
| 2013 | 1,134 | −0.41% |
| 2018 | 1,182 | +0.83% |
| 2023 | 1,248 | +1.09% |

Okaiawa had a population of 1,248 in the 2023 New Zealand census, an increase of 66 people (5.6%) since the 2018 census, and an increase of 114 people (10.1%) since the 2013 census. There were 645 males, 597 females, and 3 people of other genders in 465 dwellings. 2.4% of people identified as LGBTIQ+. The median age was 40.0 years (compared with 38.1 years nationally). There were 264 people (21.2%) aged under 15 years, 201 (16.1%) aged 15 to 29, 591 (47.4%) aged 30 to 64, and 192 (15.4%) aged 65 or older.

People could identify as more than one ethnicity. The results were 85.8% European (Pākehā); 24.5% Māori; 2.6% Pasifika; 1.7% Asian; 0.5% Middle Eastern, Latin American and African New Zealanders (MELAA); and 3.4% other, which includes people giving their ethnicity as "New Zealander". English was spoken by 97.8%, Māori by 5.5%, Samoan by 0.2%, and other languages by 3.8%. No language could be spoken by 1.4% (e.g. too young to talk). New Zealand Sign Language was known by 0.5%. The percentage of people born overseas was 9.1, compared with 28.8% nationally.

Religious affiliations were 33.4% Christian, 0.5% Hindu, 1.2% Māori religious beliefs, 0.2% Buddhist, 0.5% New Age, and 0.7% other religions. People who answered that they had no religion were 52.6%, and 10.8% of people did not answer the census question.

Of those at least 15 years old, 120 (12.2%) people had a bachelor's or higher degree, 594 (60.4%) had a post-high school certificate or diploma, and 270 (27.4%) people exclusively held high school qualifications. The median income was $44,100, compared with $41,500 nationally. 93 people (9.5%) earned over $100,000 compared to 12.1% nationally. The employment status of those at least 15 was 546 (55.5%) full-time, 150 (15.2%) part-time, and 24 (2.4%) unemployed.

== Education ==
Okaiawa Public School was established in 1884. The original school house was built of wood and iron, with two classrooms, two porches, and a teachers' residence on site. The school could accommodate a roll of 120 children. It closed and was merged to Matapu School at the beginning of 2005.
