= 1984 New Zealand rugby union tour of Australia =

Summary
P	W	D	L
Total
14	13	0	1
Test match
3	2	0	1
Opponent
P	W	D	L
Australia
3	2	0	1

The 1984 New Zealand rugby union tour of Australia was a series of fourteen rugby union matches played by the New Zealand national rugby union team (the All Blacks) in Australia in July and August 1984. The All Blacks won thirteen games and lost only the first of the three international matches against the Australia national rugby union team. It was the 25th tour of Australia by a New Zealand team.

The previous tour by the All Blacks in Australia was the 1980 tour, while Australia had visited New Zealand on their 1982 tour

The All Blacks won two test matches of three and retained the Bledisloe Cup which they had won in the 1982 series.

The first Bledisloe Cup series in Australia to have neutral referees

== The tour ==
Scores and results list New Zealand's points tally first.

Opposing Team	Score		Date	Venue	Status	Reports	
Opposing Team	For	Against	Date	Venue	Status	Preview	Match
Queensland B	37	0	4 July 1984	Ballymore Stadium, Brisbane	Tour match		
New South Wales	37	10	7 July 1984	Concord Oval, Sydney	Tour match		
South Australia	99	0	11 July 1984	Hindmarsh Stadium, Adelaide	Tour match		
Western Australia	72	0	15 July 1984	Parry Lakes, Perth	Tour match		
Victoria	65	3	17 July 1984	Olympic Park, Melbourne	Tour match		
Australia	9	16	21 July 1984	Cricket Ground, Sydney	Test match		
A.C.T.	40	16	25 July 1984	Rugby Park, Canberra	Tour match		
Sydney	28	3	28 July 1984	Concord Oval, Sydney	Tour match		
New South Wales Country	21	3	31 July 1984	No. 1 Oval, Tamworth	Tour match		
Australia	19	15	4 August 1984	Ballymore Stadium, Brisbane	Test match		
Queensland Country	88	0	8 August 1984	Carrara Stadium, Gold Coast	Tour match		
Queensland	39	12	12 August 1984	Ballymore Stadium, Brisbane	Tour match		
New South Wales B	21	15	14 August 1984	Grahame Park, Gosford	Tour match		
Australia	25	24	18 August 1984	Cricket Ground, Sydney	Test match		

== Touring party ==
- Manager: R. J. Littlejohn
- Assistant manager (coach): Bryce Rope
- Captain: Andy Dalton

=== Backs ===
- Allan Hewson
- Robbie Deans
- Mike Clamp
- Bruce Smith
- Steven Pokere
- Craig Green
- John Kirwan
- Bernie Fraser
- Warwick Taylor
- Arthur Stone
- Kawhena Woodman
- Wayne Smith
- Ian Dunn
- Andy Donald
- David Kirk

=== Forwards ===
- Murray Mexted
- Alan Whetton
- Jock Hobbs
- Mark Shaw
- Frank Shelford
- Albert Anderson
- Gary Braid
- Murray Pierce
- Gary Whetton
- John Ashworth
- Kevin Boroevich
- Gary Knight
- Brian McGrattan
- Andy Dalton
- Hika Reid
