= 1982 New Zealand Māori rugby union tour of Wales and Spain =

The 1982 New Zealand Māori rugby union tour of Wales and Spain was a series of matches played by the Māori All Blacks (then known as the New Zealand Māori team) in Wales in October and November 1982. The Māori played nine games of which they won five, lost three and drew one. Six of the games were played against Welsh club or county sides while the one was played against the Wales national rugby union team. Wales did not award full international caps for the match. The Maori then played against a Spanish Presidents XV and finally the Spain national rugby union team.

== Matches ==
Scores and results list NZ Māori's points tally first.

Opposing Team	For	Against	Date	Venue
Cardiff	17	10	October 23	Cardiff Arms Park
Maesteg	10	10	October 27	Llynfi Road, Maesteg
Swansea	12	15	October 30	St Helen's, Swansea
Monmouthshire	18	9	November 3	Rodney Parade, Newport
Llanelli	9	16	November 6	Stradey Park, Llanelli
Aberavon	34	6	November 9	Talbot Athletic Ground, Port Talbot
Wales	19	25	November 13	National Stadium, Cardiff
President's XV	62	13	November 17	La Foixarda, Barcelona
Spain	66	3	November 20	Estadio Nacional Complutense, Madrid

17 November 1982

Spain President's XV	13 - 62	New Zealand Maori
Try: Azkargorta; Pen: Moriche

La Foixarda, Barcelona
Attendance: 1.500
Referee: Allun Richards (WRU)

Spain			New Zealand Māori
José Luis Ruiz Cristín	FB	15	FB	Warren McLean
Jon Azkargorta	W	14	W	Mike Clamp
Salvador Torres	C	13	C	Arthur Stone
Carlos Oteo	C	12	C	Steven Pokere
Gabriel Rivero	W	11	W	Kawhena Woodman
Manolo Moriche (capt.)	FH	10	FH	Eddie Dunn (substituted off)
Carlos Encabo	SH	9	SH	Paul Blake
Enrique Lobo	N8	8	N8	Carl Baker
Sergio Longhney	F	7	F	Paul Quinn (capt.)
Alejandro Prehn Faura	F	6	F	Miah Melsom
Angel Garcia	L	5	L	Paul Tuoro
(substituted off) Mikel Elizalde	L	4	L	Jim Love
Salvador Torres	P	3	P	Colin Cooper
Santiago Santos	H	2	H	Bruce Hemara
Francisco Javier Baiget	P	1	P	Bill Bush
		Replacements
(substituted on) Eduardo González Arbas	L	16

20 November 1982

Spain	3 - 66	New Zealand Maori
Pen: Moriche (13')		Try: Kururangi (14'); Pokere (17'); McLean (30'); Woodman (32'); R. Dunn (40') E. Dunn (56'); Baker (59'); Pokere (61'); Kururangi(66'); Pokere (72'); McLean (76'); Con: R. Dunn (17'); R. Dunn(40'); R.Dunn (46'); R. Dunn (59'); McLean (76')

Estadio Nacional Complutense, Madrid
Attendance: 6.000
Referee: Georges Domercq (FFR)

Spain			New Zealand Māori
José Luis Ruiz Cristín	FB	15	FB	Warren McLean
José Tormo	W	14	W	Robert Kururangi
Fernando García de la Torre	C	13	C	Arthur Stone
Carlos Oteo	C	12	C	Steven Pokere
(substituted off) Ricardo Sainz de la Cuesta	W	11	W	Kawhena Woodman
Manolo Moriche (capt.)	FH	10	FH	Eddie Dunn (substituted off)
Carlos Encabo	SH	9	SH	Richard Dunn (substituted off)
José Antonio Egido	N8	8	N8	Carl Baker
Sergio Longhney	F	7	F	Paul Quinn (capt.)
Felipe Blanco	F	6	F	Frank Shelford
Angel Garcia	L	5	L	Paul Tuoro
Paco Méndez	L	4	L	Jim Love
Ramón Nuche	P	3	P	Paul Koteka
Santiago Santos	H	2	H	Bruce Hemara
(substituted off) Antonio Machuca	P	1	P	Bill Bush
		Replacements
(substituted on) Paco Lorenzo	W	16		(substituted on) Paul Blake
		17		(substituted on) Tu Wyllie

== Touring party ==
- Manager: Waka Nathan
- Assistant Manager: Percy Erceg
- Captain: Paul Quinn

Player	Province	Position
Andy Baker	Waikato	Fullback
Carl Baker	Wairarapa Bush	No 8
Paul Blake	Hawke's Bay	Halfback
Kevin Boroevich	King Country	Prop
Bill Bush	Canterbury	Prop
Mike Clamp	Wellington	Winger
Colin Cooper	Taranaki Rugby Union	Flanker
Scott Crichton	Wellington	Prop
Eddie Dunn	North Auckland	1st five-eighths
Richard Dunn	Auckland	Half back
Bruce Hemara	Manawatu	Hooker
Paul Koteka	Waikato	Prop
Robert Kururangi	Counties	Winger
Jim Love	Marlborough	Lock/No 8
Warren McLean	Counties	Fullback
Miah Melsom	Waikato	Flanker
Felix O'Carroll	Taranaki	Hooker
Steven Pokere	Southland	2nd five-eighths/centre
Paul Quinn	Wellington	Flanker
Hud Rickit	Waikato	Lock
Frank Shelford	Bay of Plenty	Flanker
Wayne Shelford	Auckland	Flanker/No 8
Victor Simpson	Canterbury	2nd five-eighths/centre/winger
Arthur Stone	Waikato	2nd five-eighths/centre
Paul Tuoro	Counties	Lock
Kawhena Woodman	North Auckland	Winger
Tu Wyllie	Wellington	1st five-eighths
