= 1984 New Zealand rugby union tour of Fiji =

Summary
P	W	D	L
Total
4	4	0	0
Test match
1	1	0	0
Opponent
P	W	D	L
Fiji
1	1	0	0

The 1984 New Zealand rugby union tour of Fiji was a series of four rugby union matches played by the New Zealand national rugby union team (the All Blacks) in Fiji in October 1984. The All Blacks won all four games, including the international match against the Fiji national rugby union team which New Zealand did not consider a full international match.

== Matches ==
Scores and results list New Zealand's points tally first.

Opponent	For	Against	Date	Venue
President's XV	39	0	17 October	National Stadium, Suva
Western XV	32	10	20 October	Prince Charles Park, Nadi
Eastern XV	58	0	24 October	National Stadium, Suva
Fiji	45	0	27 October	National Stadium, Suva

== Touring party ==
- Manager:
- Assistant Manager (coach):
- Captain: Jock Hobbs

=== Backs ===
- Kieran Crowley
- Mark Finlay
- Mike Clamp
- Steven Pokere
- Craig Green
- Warwick Taylor
- Arthur Stone
- Kawhena Woodman
- Wayne Smith
- Grant Fox
- Andy Donald
- David Kirk

=== Forwards ===
- Murray Mexted
- Alan Whetton
- Jock Hobbs
- Mark Shaw
- Frank Shelford
- Albert Anderson
- Murray Pierce
- Andy Haden
- Gary Whetton
- Kevin Boroevich
- Gary Knight
- Brian McGrattan
- Scott Crichton
- Hika Reid
- John Mills
