= 1983 New Zealand rugby union tour of Scotland and England =

Summary
P	W	D	L
Total
8	5	1	2
Test match
2	0	1	1
Opponent
P	W	D	L
Scotland
1	0	1	0
England
1	0	0	1

The 1983 New Zealand rugby union tour of Britain was a series of eight matches played by the New Zealand national rugby union team (the All Blacks) in Scotland and England in October and November 1983. New Zealand won five of their eight games, drew one and lost the other two. They won neither of the two international matches, drawing with Scotland and losing to England. In the non-international fixtures they also suffered a defeat by the English Midlands Division invitational team.

== Matches ==
Scores and results list New Zealand's points tally first.

Opposing team	For	Against	Date	Venue
Edinburgh	22	6	26 October	Myreside, Edinburgh
South of Scotland	30	9	29 October	Netherdale, Galashiels
Northern Division	27	21	2 November	Gateshead International Stadium, Gateshead
London Division	18	15	5 November	Twickenham, London
Midland Division	13	19	8 November	Welford Road, Leicester
SCOTLAND	25	25	12 November	Murrayfield, Edinburgh
South & South-West Division	18	6	15 November	Memorial Ground, Bristol
ENGLAND	9	15	19 November	Twickenham, London

== Touring party ==
- Manager: P.W. Mitchell
- Assistant Manager: Bryce Rope
- Captain: Stu Wilson

=== Backs ===
- Kieran Crowley (Taranaki)
- Robbie Deans (Canterbury)
- Stu Wilson (Wellington)
- Bernie Fraser (Wellington)
- Bruce Smith (Waikato)
- Craig Green (Canterbury)
- Steven Pokere (Southland)
- Warwick Taylor (Canterbury)
- Ian Dunn (North Auckland)
- Wayne Smith (Canterbury)
- Andrew Donald (Wanganui)
- David Kirk (Otago)

=== Forwards ===
- Murray Mexted (Wellington)
- Geoff Old (Manawatu)
- Mark Shaw (Manawatu)
- Jock Hobbs (Canterbury)
- Frank Shelford (Hawke's Bay)
- Albert Anderson (Canterbury)
- Gary Braid (Bay of Plenty)
- Alastair Robinson (North Auckland)
- Murray Davie (Canterbury)
- Scott Crichton (Wellington)
- Kevin Boroevich (King Country)
- Brian McGrattan (Wellington)
- Hika Reid (Bay of Plenty)
- Brett Wilson (Counties)
