= 1981 New Zealand rugby union tour of Romania and France =

Summary
P	W	D	L
Total
10	8	1	1
Test match
3	3	0	0
Opponent
P	W	D	L
France
2	2	0	0
Romania
1	1	0	0

The 1981 New Zealand rugby union tour of Romania and France was a series of ten matches played by the New Zealand national rugby union team (the All Blacks) in Romania and France in October and November 1981. The All Blacks won eight of the ten games, including the international match against Romania and both internationals against France. The only team to defeat the All Blacks was a French regional selection, and the All Blacks were also held to a draw by another regional team.

== Matches ==
Scores and results list New Zealand's points tally first.

Opposing Team	For	Against	Date	Venue
Southern Romania XV	25	9	20 October	Constanța
ROMANIA	14	6	24 October	Stadionul Național, Bucharest
French Selection	15	13	28 October	Strasbourg
French Selection	18	10	31 October	Clermont-Ferrand
French Selection	16	18	4 November	Grenoble
French Barbarians	28	18	7 November	Bayonne
French Selection	6	6	11 November	Perpignan
FRANCE	13	9	14 November	Stadium Municipal, Toulouse
French Selection	17	13	17 November	La Rochelle
FRANCE	18	6	21 November	Parc des Princes, Paris

== Touring party ==
- Manager: P. Gill
- Assistant Manager: Peter Burke
- Captain: Graham Mourie

=== Backs ===
- Allan Hewson (Wellington)
- Bernie Fraser (Wellington)
- Stu Wilson (Wellington)
- Fred Woodman (North Auckland)
- Jamie Salmon (Wellington)
- Arthur Stone (Waikato)
- Lachie Cameron (Manawatu)
- Steven Pokere (Southland)
- Doug Rollerson (Manawatu)
- Brian McKechnie (Southland)
- Dave Loveridge (Taranaki)
- Andrew Donald (Wanganui)
- John Boe (Waikato) replacement during tour

=== Forwards ===
- Murray Mexted (Wellington)
- Geoff Old (Manawatu)
- Graham Mourie (Taranank)
- Frank Shelford (Bay of Plenty)
- Mark Shaw (Manawatu)
- Andy Haden (Auckland)
- Gary Whetton (Auckland)
- Jock Ross (Mid-Canterbury)
- Rod Ketels (Counties)
- Wayne Neville (North Auckland)
- John Spiers (Counties)
- Paul Koteka (Waikato)
- Hika Reid (Bay of Plenty)
- Andy Dalton (Counties)
- Brian Morrissey (Waikato) replacement during tour
