= New Zealand Cavaliers =

New Zealand rugby union team

1986 Cavaliers tour in South Africa
Summary
P	W	D	L
Total
12	8	0	4
Test match
4	1	0	3
Opponent
P	W	D	L
South Africa
4	3	0	1

The Cavaliers was an unofficial New Zealand rugby union team which toured South Africa in 1986. Because of the Apartheid policies of the South African government, the official New Zealand Rugby Union tour scheduled for 1985 was cancelled, and the Cavaliers tour was very controversial in New Zealand.

They played twelve matches, including a four-match test series against South Africa, which they lost 3–1.

== History ==
After the intensely controversial 1981 South African tour of New Zealand, which had provoked nationwide protest and worldwide condemnation, the official All Black tour planned for 1985 was cancelled due to a legal ruling that it would be incompatible with the NZRFU's legally stated purpose: "...the fostering and encouragement of the game of rugby..."

Of the 30 players who had been selected for the 1985 tour, only David Kirk and John Kirwan did not join the Cavaliers. The rebel team were widely believed to have received large secret payments; a controversial issue at a time when rugby union was still supposedly an amateur sport.

The Cavaliers were coached by Colin Meads, managed by Ian Kirkpatrick and captained by Andy Dalton and won just one of the four matches against South Africa, although they won seven of their eight other games on the tour. Dalton suffered a broken jaw in the second match of the tour against Northern Transvaal and played no more rugby that season, Jock Hobbs assumed the captaincy for the test matches against the Springboks while Andy Haden did the same for the midweek matches.

The tour was widely condemned for touring apartheid South Africa, and very controversial within New Zealand, and there were no future rugby contacts until the South African apartheid regime ended. The return test that marked the return of South Africa to official international Rugby Union in 1992 would again be held against a New Zealand side, this time the official All Blacks.

The players found that support for their actions was far less than they had expected. On their return, the NZRFU barred all the players from participating in the next two All Black tests, and instead selected a new group of players. Most of these replacement players were younger, and were quickly dubbed the "Baby Blacks". Those new All Blacks went on to form the basis of one of the most successful periods in All Black rugby, which resulted in a few Cavalier players struggling to get their places back.

Not being able to play in the official jersey, the team wore a black uniform (supplied by Adidas), with bands of gold in honour of the tour sponsor, the South African Yellow Pages, who also covered the stay expenses for the team. The emblem consisted of a gold background (shaped as a top view of the Ellis Park) with a green oval in which an upright silver fern accompanied by a Springbok appeared.

== Management ==
- Colin Meads (King Country) (coach)
- Ian Kirkpatrick (Poverty Bay) (manager)

== Backs ==
- Robbie Deans (Canterbury)
- Kieran Crowley (Taranaki)
- Bernie Fraser (Wellington)
- Mike Clamp (Wellington)
- Craig Green (Canterbury)
- Bill Osborne (Wanganui)
- Steven Pokere (Auckland)
- Bryce Robins (Taranaki)
- Victor Simpson (Canterbury)
- Warwick Taylor (Canterbury)
- Wayne Smith (Canterbury)
- Grant Fox (Auckland)
- Dave Loveridge (Taranaki)
- Andrew Donald (Wanganui)

== Forwards ==
- Murray Mexted (Wellington)
- Wayne Shelford (North Harbour)
- Jock Hobbs (Canterbury)
- Mark Shaw (Hawke's Bay)
- Frank Shelford (Bay of Plenty)
- Alan Whetton (Auckland)
- Andy Haden (Auckland)
- Albert Anderson (Canterbury)
- Gary Whetton (Auckland)
- Murray Pierce (Wellington)
- John Ashworth (Hawke's Bay)
- Gary Knight (Manawatu)
- Steve McDowall (Auckland)
- Scott Crichton (Wellington)
- Andy Dalton (Counties) (Captain)
- John Mills (Canterbury)
- Hika Reid (Bay of Plenty)

== Matches ==
Scores and results list New Zealand's points tally first.

Date	Opponent	Location	Result	Score
23 April	Junior Springboks (Griquas Invitational XV)	Johannesburg	Won	22–21
26 April	Northern Transvaal	Pretoria	Won	10–9
30 April	Orange Free State	Bloemfontein	Won	31–9
3 May	Transvaal	Johannesburg	Lost	19–24
6 May	Western Province	Cape Town	Won	26–15
10 May	South Africa (1)	Newlands, Cape Town	Lost	15–21
13 May	Natal	Durban	Won	37–24
17 May	South Africa (2)	Kings Park, Durban	Won	19–18
20 May	South African Barbarians	Johannesburg	Won	42–13
24 May	South Africa (3)	Loftus Versfeld, Pretoria	Lost	18–33
27 May	Western Transvaal	Potchefstroom	Won	26–18
31 May	South Africa (4)	Ellis Park, Johannesburg	Lost	10-24

== See also ==
- 1981 South Africa rugby union tour of New Zealand
- Sporting boycott of South Africa during the apartheid era
- South Africa under apartheid
