= Vincent Bevan =

New Zealand rugby union player (1921–1996)

Vincent David Bevan
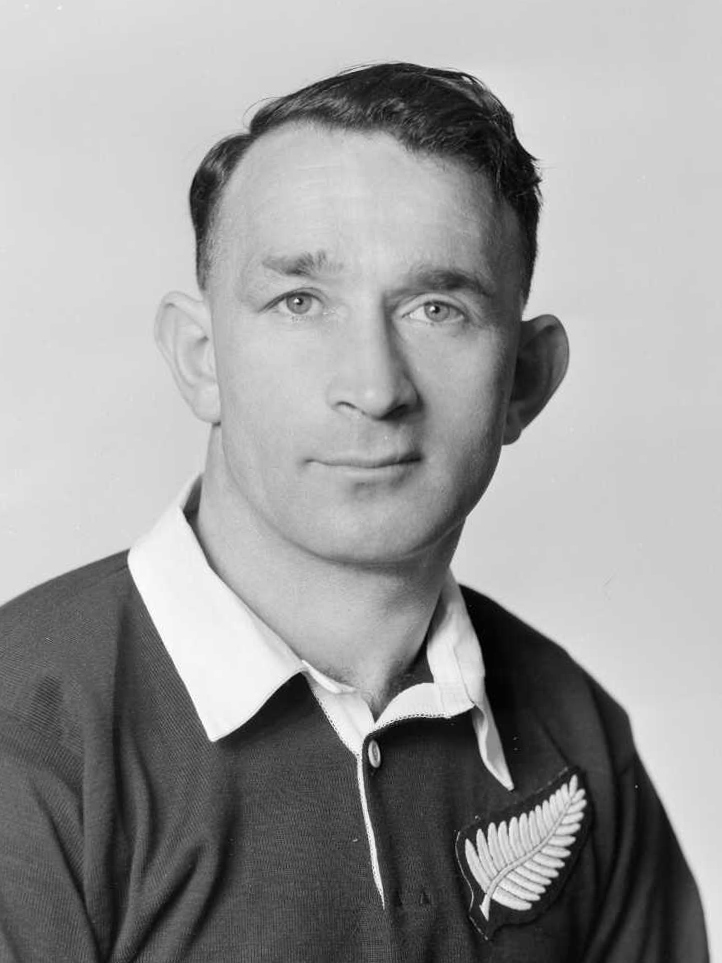
- Bevan in 1953
- Born: Vincent David Bevan; 24 December 1921 Ōtaki, New Zealand
- Died: 26 May 1996 (aged 74) Wellington, New Zealand
- Height: 1.65 m (5 ft 5 in)
- Weight: 72 kg (159 lb)
- School: Otaki Convent School
- Notable relative(s): Henry Bevan (uncle) Moray Bevan (half-brother); Keith Davis (cousin); Tamati Ellison (grandson); Jacob Ellison (grandson)
- Occupation(s): Café owner, carpenter, milk vendor and taxi proprietor

Rugby union career
- Position: Halfback
Provincial / State sides
Years	Team	Apps	(Points)
1943–54	Wellington	75	(32)
International career
Years	Team	Apps	(Points)
1947–54	New Zealand	25	(3)

Vincent David Bevan (24 December 1921 – 26 May 1996) was a New Zealand rugby union player.

== Early life ==
Vincent David Bevan was born on 24 December 1921, in the Horowhenua at Ōtaki, about halfway between Wellington and Palmerston North, and was the son of Winifred Bevan and Lewis Homes.

== Playing career ==
Bevan served in the North African and Italian campaigns during World War II and played for the 22nd New Zealand Battalion team (winners of the Freyberg Cup in 1944), the 9th Brigade and 8th Army XVs and the 7th Brigade Group (1942).

The final of the 1944 Freyberg Cup was contested in early December in the ruins of the Fascist Stadium in Forlì in Italy. A tense game was played between the 22nd Battalion team and the 2nd New Zealand Division Ammunition Company. The match was vigorous, the ground conditions atrocious and the day bitingly cold. It was a tough contest with little opportunity for the backs to shine. Bevan displayed good form and threw a pass to his captain, Lin Thomas, who kicked the dropped goal from the only dry spot on the ground and won the game for the 22nd Battalion, 4–0.

Bevan played for Wellington College Old Boys before being selected by the former All Black Alex McDonald to represent the Wellington Rugby Football Union at a provincial level. He wasn't always the first choice halfback for Wellington, being bumped from the top spot in 1946 by Dr Manahi Nitama Paewai. In 1947, Bevan made the first of his four appearances for the North Island in the annual interisland match.

He was a member of the New Zealand national side, the All Blacks, from 1947 to 1954. But for injury, (Bevan had either fallen from a truck or had been hit by a truck near the front line at the end of the War), he may well have played for the famous New Zealand team which in 1945–46 toured Britain and France. The trials for the team were held in Austria and Bevan had shown such good form that his selection had been a certainty.

Bevan's official All Blacks profile says that "he is best remembered for games he didn't play and the tour he was not allowed to go on. Bevan's career, indeed, is one of the starkest examples of some of the gross stupidities, even injustices, New Zealand rugby created for itself by trying for too long to fit in with the colour bar, later formalised as apartheid, being enforced in South Africa. Bevan should have been the All Blacks' number one halfback on the tour of South Africa in 1949, but an inadvertent reference to his trace of Māori ancestry a year or two beforehand meant he was ruled ineligible to be selected".

His first two test caps came instead in the 1949 series against Australia that was played in New Zealand. This tour coincided with the stronger though Māori-free All Blacks team touring South Africa. Bevan played all four tests the following year against the touring British Lions. Injuries prevented him from touring with the 1951 All Blacks to Australia. Bevan was a member of the 1953–54 New Zealand rugby union tour of the United Kingdom, Ireland, France and North America and played capably enough during his 16 appearances. But with age he was losing a little of his speed and his cousin, Keith Davis, his junior by nearly 10 years, was preferred for all five internationals.

In total, Bevan played 25 matches for the All Blacks including six tests. His only points for the All Blacks came in a match at Manchester on 17 February 1954 when he scored a try in a 17–3 win against North-Western Counties.

During his first-class career, Bevan played for multiple teams starting with The Wellington College Old Boys (1943), Athletic (1946–49), Tawa (1950–51), Athletic (1953–54), North Island (1947–49, 53), NZ Trials (1947, 50, 53) and finally New Zealand XV (1949). During those years he built a club partnership with Bill Freeman, who later became a successful coach for Wellington.

In 75 matches for Wellington, Bevan scored seven tries, two conversions and two dropped goals. His first try for Wellington came in the 1943 season against Canterbury. Two of Bevan's tries came in Ranfurly Shield matches for Wellington during the 1953 season against Otago and Taranaki respectively. Against Taranaki at Athletic Park, Wellington on 29 August 1953, the Wellington forwards "asserted their mastery...[and] the speedy backline had a feast of ball and treated the crowd to spectacular rugby". During the game, Bevan was "a livewire link between the forwards and backs". Up 18–0 at halftime, Wellington won the match 26–3.

Bevan rounded out his long career with several appearances in festival-type matches for the Centurions (1952, 55–56), bringing his first class match tally to 121 with a total of 11 tries, two conversions and two dropped goals.

== Test matches and playing style ==
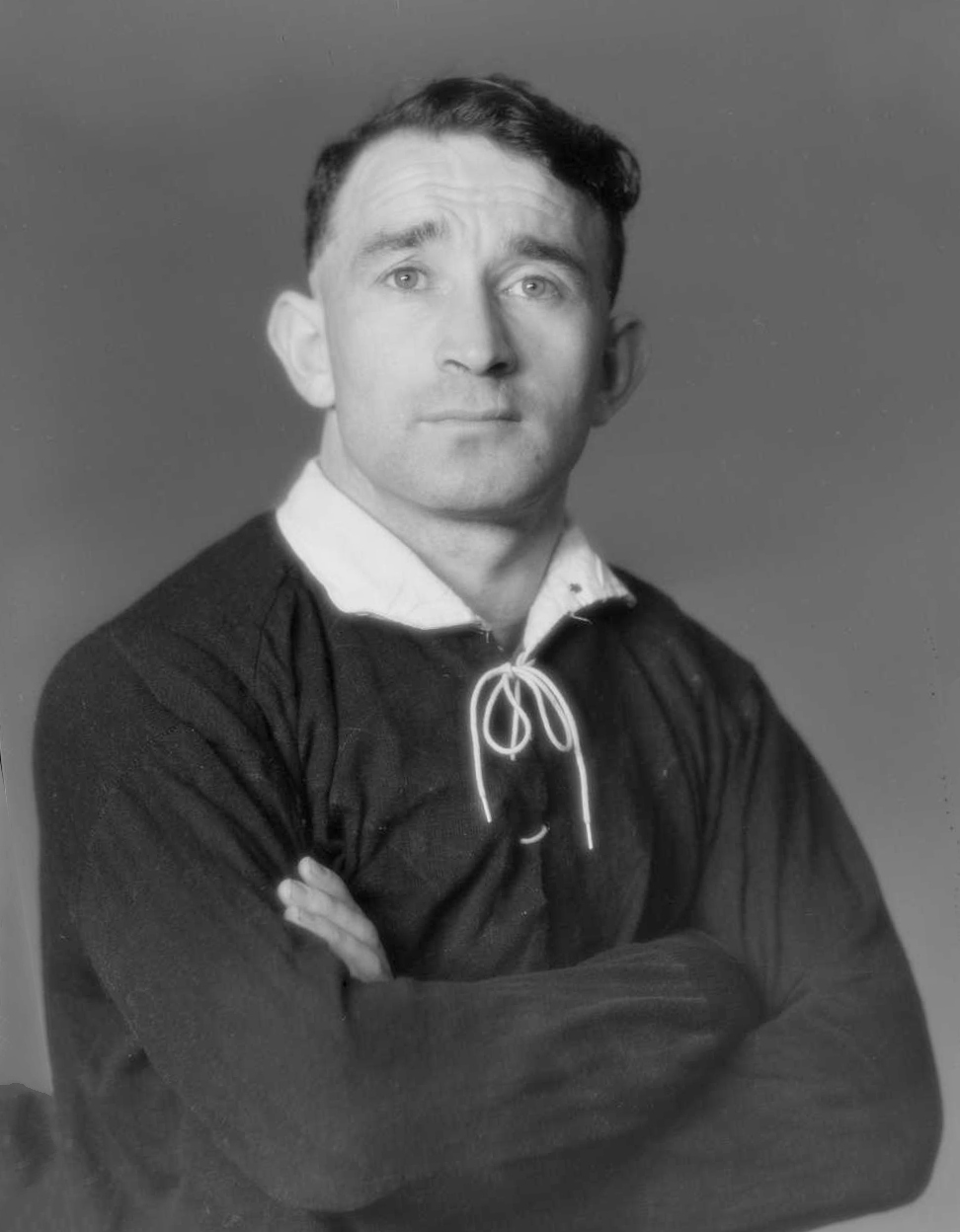
Vincent Bevan in 1949

Alex McDonald had originally been impressed by Bevan's strength, quickness, length of pass and hard-nosed application and was part of the selection panel that sent him to Australia as an All Black in 1947. Although Bevan played well, he failed to make the test lineup in the two-match series, with Auckland's Percy Tetzlaff preferred.

Against Australia, in the second test in the 1949 series that was played at Eden Park in Auckland on 24 September 1949, Bevan gave away several penalties but played a rugged game and his passing was generally good, although Australia scored after nineteen minutes when Bevan threw a wild pass to Jack McLean on the blindside near his own line. The All Blacks lost the test 16–9.

The first test against the Lions in the 1950 series was played at Carisbrook in Dunedin on 27 May 1950. As the All Black forwards started to show improvement, Bevan received a ball quickly from a scrum, which he gathered and started a run wide across the field on the open side. In an attempt to beat the Lions defence, he gave the ball a tap with his foot but it bounced head high and Jack Kyle had it for the Lions. In a flash he was through the All Blacks, and racing for the line 25 yards away. A shoulder-high tackle by Nau Cherrington stopped him for only an instant before he was over the line. Later in the game, George Beatty received a pass from Bevan about the twenty-five. With the pace on Beatty passed to Roy Roper, who beat four men and scored a few yards from the corner. With seven minutes left, Bob Scott came up into a rush and kicked high toward the Lions' goal before a scrum was then ordered not more than 10 yards from the post. Ron Elvidge called for a pass from Bevan down the blindside which he received and away went the All Black captain on an irresistible dash for the corner past at least three defenders. Elvidge crashed over for the try and the match ended with the scores tied at 9–9.

In the third test against the Lions at Athletic Park in Wellington on 1 July 1950, Bevan played behind an All Black pack of six, which was shredded by injury and the no-replacement law of the day. The match provided the stirring spectacle of the six All Black forwards battling against eight, and a team of 13 physically effective players gaining the mastery of 15. Bevan scolded, spurred and cajoled the pack and showed a perception of pressure points, breadth and alacrity of clearance and physical toughness that were telling factors in transforming a mission impossible into a day of glory for New Zealand rugby. The second half of the match was only a few minutes old when a touch finder from Bevan brought the All Blacks into the Lion's twenty-five on the right flank. He then sensed a half-chance out to his left and the ball was spun through the backs which led to the winning try by the injured All Black captain, Elvidge. The All Blacks won the test 6–3.

The fourth and final test was played at Eden Park in Auckland on 29 July 1950. Early on, Bevan shot through a gap and Graham Mexted carried on almost to the Lion's goal-line. Later in the match Richard White led a good movement and the Lion's line was close at hand when Bevan ran from a scrum, only to be swamped. Bevan then sparkled with two dashing breaks and Bill Meates almost scored from the second.> The final score was 11–8 to the All Blacks.

Bevan based his passing game on his swiftness to retrieve ball hooked at high velocity and on a swivelling dive-pass that foiled marauders and spoilers. He was quick to respond to physical affront, real or imagined, and employed a devastating hip-throw that felled and humiliated many unsuspecting locks and props steamrolling with belligerent intent through the lineout.

== Controversial non-selections ==
Bevan lost some of the best years of his career when international rugby was mothballed during and after World War II. The All Blacks played just four tests between 1939 and the 1949 tour to South Africa.

The nuggety Bevan was widely considered New Zealand's best halfback of the immediate post-war period. He wasn't selected for the All Blacks tour of South Africa in 1949, however, as the Māori Advisory Council had informed the New Zealand Rugby Football Union that he had Māori ancestry. Bevan's mother was half Māori and once that became known New Zealand's best halfback was ruled ineligible for the tour, where race rules in South Africa at the time meant rugby was strictly for Europeans. New Zealand was beaten in all four tests for various reasons, not the least the lack of a top halfback.

Māori players who may have made the All Blacks tour of South Africa also included Nau Cherrington, Ron Bryers, Ben Couch and Johnny Smith. The captain, Fred Allen (rugby union), later mourned the loss of Smith and in particular Bevan from the tour.

Prior to the tour, the Member of Parliament for Northern Māori, Tapihana Paraire Paikea, used the Budget debate in Parliament to comment on the exclusion of the Māori players. He drew attention to the plight of Bevan, who was not eligible for the Māori team which visited Fiji in 1949 because he had too little Māori blood, but was now prevented from going to South Africa because he had too much Māori blood.

It was said that Bevan was not considered by Māori of the time to have enough Māori blood to be a Māori All Black. He never once appeared for a New Zealand Māori selection or in any Māori match such as a Prince of Wales Cup trial.

== Involvement in opposition to the 1960 All Black tour to South Africa ==
Bevan, along with other sports people, academics, well-known church and Māori leaders, and trade unionists, sponsored the petition organised by the Citizens' All Black Tour Association that called for the abandonment of the 1960 All Black tour to South Africa and for the government to intervene. This was because the New Zealand Rugby Football Union had decided, as it had done in the past, that it would be in the best interests of Māori players that they should not be selected for the tour. The petition gained 153,000 signatures. but was largely ignored by the Union and the government.

Together with George Nēpia and Manahi Nitama Paewai, Bevan was a member of a fifty person deputation that met with Prime Minister Walter Nash and the leader of the Opposition, Jack Marshall, calling for the cancellation of the tour. This protest, which took place on 26 February 1960, had been led by the Association's chairman, Dr Rolland O'Regan, but it did not succeed; the 1960 tour went ahead as planned.

== Sources ==
- Mulholland, M. (2009). Beneath the Maori Moon: An Illustrated History of Maori Rugby. Wellington: Huia Publishers.
- Richards, T. (1999). Dancing on our bones: New Zealand, South Africa, rugby and racism. Wellington: Bridget Williams Books.
- Swan, A.C.; Jackson, G.F.W. (1952). Wellington Rugby History 1870–1950. Wellington: A. H. & A. W. Reed.
- White, Steven (2 October 2014). "Wellington v Taranaki 1953: the high point of a golden year". College Rugby.
- Zavos, S. (1979). After the Final Whistle. Mourie's 'Grand-Slam' All Blacks...and the Controversies, Personalities and Tactics of Post-War New Zealand Rugby. Wellington: Fourth Estate Books Limited.
