= Brett Wilson (disambiguation) =

W. Brett Wilson (born 1957) is a Canadian investment banker, businessman, investor and television personality on Dragons' Den.

Brett Wilson may also refer to:

- Brett Wilson (rugby union) (born 1957), New Zealand rugby union player
- Brett Michael Wilson (born 1988), American actor and musician
