= Alberto Malo =

Spain international rugby union player

- Born: Alberto Malo i Navio; 3 April 1964 (age 62) Sant Boi de Llobregat, Spain
- Height: 6 ft 3 in (1.91 m)
- Weight: 220 lb (100 kg)

Rugby union career
- Position: Flanker
Senior career
| Years | Team | Apps | (Points) |
| 1975–1990 | UE Santboiana | | |
| 1990–1991 | Freyberg RC | | |
| 1991–2000 | UE Santboiana | | |
International career
| Years | Team | Apps | (Points) |
| 1986–1999 | Spain | 64 | (9) |

Alberto Malo i Navio (born 3 April 1964) is a former Spanish rugby union player. In his home region of Catalonia his name is often spelled Albert Malo. He played as number eight. He is usually considered one of the best Spanish rugby players ever. He is graduated in Direction and Management of Sports Entities by the University of Barcelona. He also has a Master in Economic Direction of Sports Entities.

Malo played his entire Spanish career at UE Santboiana, starting aged 10 in 1975/76. He was promoted to the first category at 17 years old, in 1981. In 1990/91, he had his only season abroad when he played in the New Zealand team of Freyberg RC, after an invitation of Bruce Hemara, who later would be his coach at UE Santboiana. He would play until 1999/2000, ending his career aged 36 years old. He always refused invitations to play in the much competitive French Championship. He won 5 Spanish Leagues titles, in 1983/84, 1986/87, 1988/89, 1995/96 and 1996/97, 2 Spanish Copas del Rey, in 1989 and 2000, and 2 Iberian Cups, in 1988 and 1989.

Malo had 33 caps for Spain, from 1986 to 1999, scoring 2 tries, 9 points on aggregate. The highest point of his career was his presence at the 1999 Rugby World Cup as captain, playing in two games but without scoring.

His biography, written by Gloria Llorente, Albert Malo. Un Catalán en la Élite del Rugby Internacional, was published in 2004.
