= Pat Walsh (rugby union) =

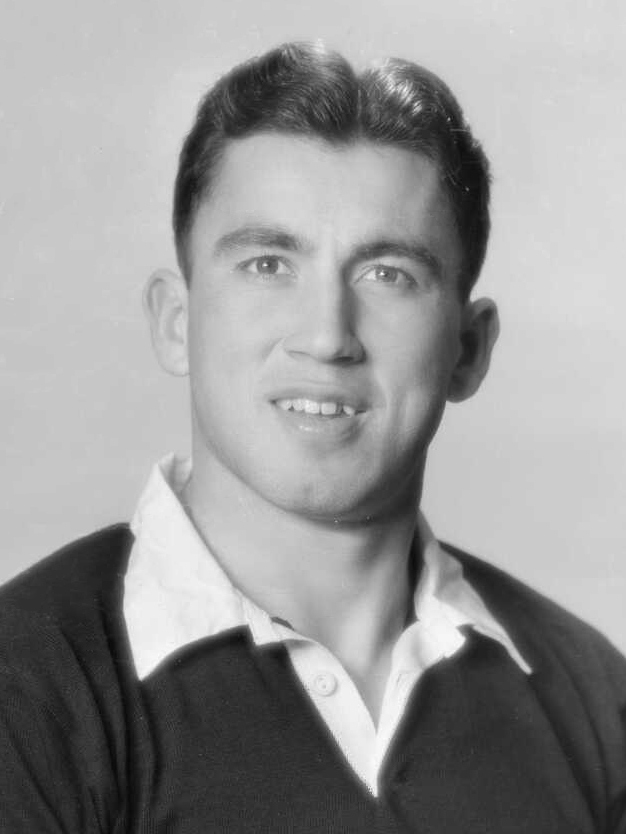
- Born: Patrick Timothy Walsh; 6 May 1936 Kaitaia, New Zealand
- Died: 23 November 2007 (aged 71) Auckland, New Zealand
- Height: 1.75 m (5 ft 9 in)
- Weight: 78 kg (172 lb)
- School: Sacred Heart College
- University: Ardmore Teachers' College

Rugby union career
- Position: Utility back
Provincial / State sides
Years	Team	Apps	(Points)
- Auckland
-	Counties		
International career
Years	Team	Apps	(Points)
1955–63	New Zealand	13	(12)

Patrick Timothy Walsh (6 May 1936 – 23 November 2007) was a New Zealand rugby union player and selector. He played 13 Tests and 14 other games for the All Blacks from 1955 to 1964. He also played for New Zealand Māori in 1955, 1956, 1958, 1959 1961, captaining the side on its 1958 tour to Australia, against the British Lions in 1959 and against the French in 1961. He was an All Black selector from 1969 to 1971.

Awards
Preceded by Keith Davis	Tom French Memorial; Māori rugby union player of the year 1955; 1958	Succeeded by Percy Erceg
Preceded by Muru Walters	Tom French Memorial; Māori rugby union player of the year 1955; 1958	Succeeded by Bill Wordley
