= Scott Crichton =

Scott Crichton may refer to:

- Scott Crichton (judge) (born 1954), member of the Louisiana Supreme Court
- Scott Crichton (American football) (born 1991), American football defensive end
- Scott Crichton (rugby union) (born 1954), New Zealand rugby union player
