= McGrattan =

McGrattan is a surname. Notable people with the surname include:

- Brian McGrattan (rugby union) (born 1959), New Zealand rugby union player
- Brian McGrattan (born 1981), Canadian ice hockey player
- Gerard McGrattan (born 1972), Northern Ireland hurler
- Johnny McGrattan (born 1977), Northern Ireland hurler
- Tom McGrattan (1927–2022), Canadian ice hockey player
- William McGrattan (born 1956), Canadian Catholic bishop
