= Keith Davis (rugby union) =

New Zealand rugby union player (1930–2019)

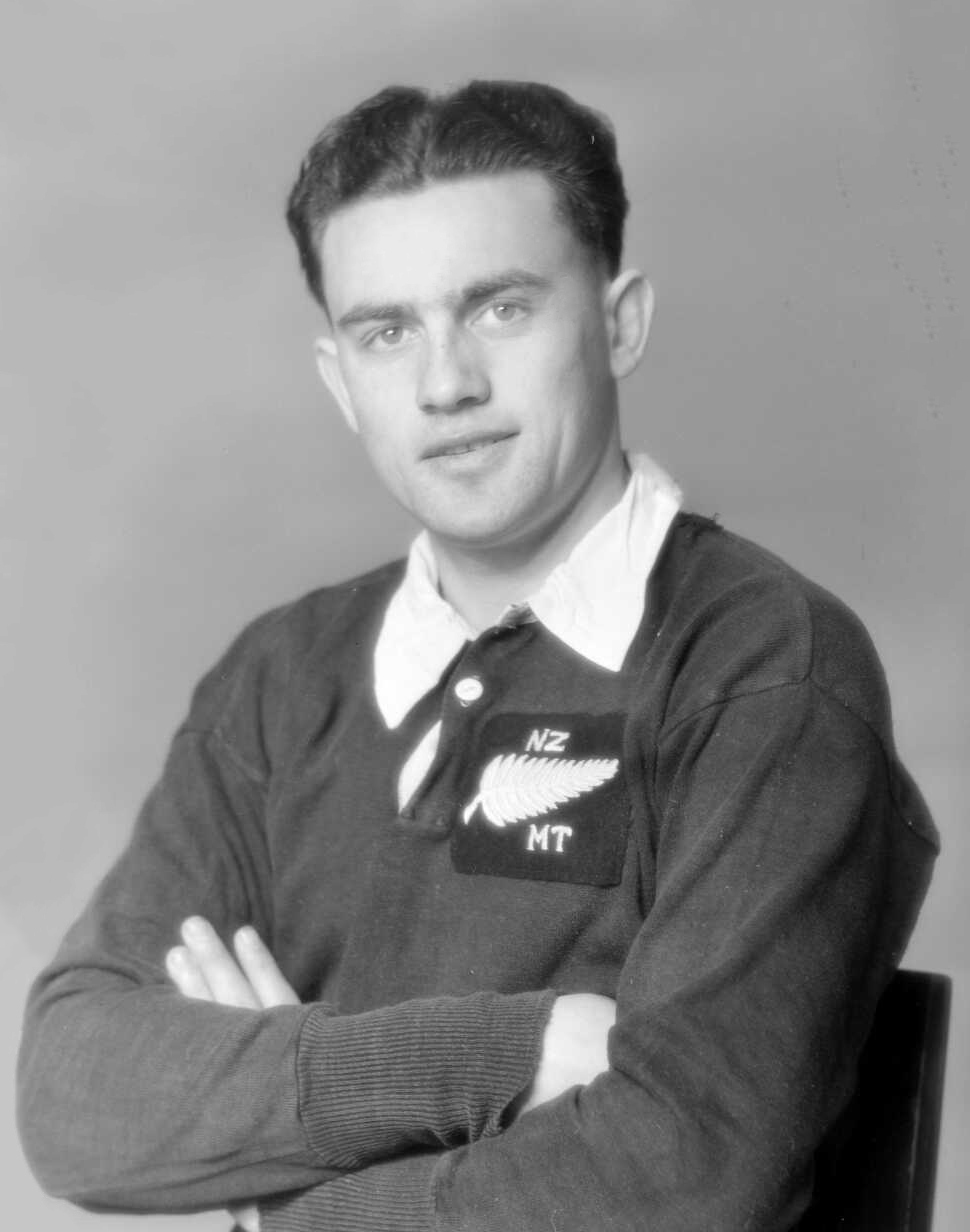
- Davis c. 1951
- Born: 25 January 1930 Whakatāne, New Zealand
- Died: 2 March 2019 (aged 89)
- Height: 1.70 m (5.6 ft)
- Weight: 73 kg (161 lb)
- School: Sacred Heart College, Auckland

Rugby union career
- Position: Half-back
Amateur team(s)
Years	Team	Apps	(Points)
- Marist Auckland
Provincial / State sides
Years	Team	Apps	(Points)
1952–58	Auckland	54	
1952–59	Auckland B		
International career
Years	Team	Apps	(Points)
1952–58	New Zealand	25	(12)
1952–59	Māori All Blacks		

Keith Davis (25 Jan 1930 – 2 March 2019) was a New Zealand rugby union player who played for both New Zealand and New Zealand Māori. He played for Auckland, and won the Ranfurly Shield in his first ever provincial game. After gaining All Blacks selection in 1952, Davis toured with the team to Europe and North America in 1953–54. He played extensively for New Zealand Māori between 1952 and his retirement in 1959; his time with the team included matches against both South Africa and the British Lions. Davis was awarded the Tom French Cup for Māori player of the year in 1952, 1953 and 1954.

== Early career ==
Keith Davis was born in Whakatāne and educated at Sacred Heart College in Auckland, where he played for the first XV from 1947 to 1949. He was half-back, and was selected for Auckland in 1952 after making a number of appearances for the Auckland B side in 1951 and early 1952. Davis' first provincial game was a Ranfurly Shield challenge against Waikato that Auckland won 9–0 to raise the Shield. The side's first defence was against Waikato two weeks later; with Waikato avenging their loss to regain the Shield following a 6–3 victory. Davis was selected for the New Zealand Māori in early 1952, and played with them during their internal-tour of New Zealand. He was subsequently selected for the New Zealand national side—the All Blacks—later that year. He made his Test debut against Australia on 13 September 1952, a match that the All Blacks won 15–8. At the conclusion of the 1952 season he was awarded the Tom French Cup for Māori player of the year.

== 1953–54 European tour ==
In 1953 Davis was selected as one of the half-backs for the All Blacks' tour of Europe and North America. He was preferred over his cousin, Vincent Bevan, as the starting half-back for the All Blacks' five Tests. Of the five Test matches—against England, France, Ireland, Scotland, and Wales—the All Blacks won three; their two losses coming to France and Wales. Davis also played in the All Blacks last match of the British and Irish leg of their tour—against Barbarian F.C. in Cardiff. The All Blacks were behind 5–3 at the end of the first half, but after a Davis try early in the second half to give them a 6–3 lead, (Note: Tries were worth three points in 1954.) before a conversion by Ron Jarden. The All Blacks scored a further three tries, with the final one set up by Davis, to eventually win 19–5. He was All Black number 546.

== New Zealand Māori and later career ==
After returning from tour, Davis was selected to captain the New Zealand Māori tour of Fiji in 1954. Before leaving for Fiji, the team played six matches against provincial teams in New Zealand. The eight match tour of Fiji included three matches against Fiji; the team won seven of their matches, with the one loss to Fiji in Lautoka.

The following year Davis was recalled for one Test match against Australia that the All Blacks won 8–0. He did not play any of the All Blacks' matches against the 1956 Springboks, but was a reserve in two Tests of the series. The most important New Zealand Māori match of the season was against the touring Springboks—Davis was selected at half-back. The match was lost 37–0, and has been tainted by accusations that Ernest Corbett, the Māori Affairs Minister at the time, had asked the New Zealanders to lose the match. However some members of the Māori side have disputed that Corbett even spoke to their team. The match was described by historian Lindsay Knight as "one of the worst experiences in his [Davis's] career".

Davis toured with the Māori to Australia in 1958, and played all three "Test" matches against Australia. (Note: The Australian players were awarded Test caps for this series, however the New Zealand Rugby Union does not award Test caps for Māori All Black games.) Australia won the first Test, but the second Test resulted in a 3–3 draw. However the Māori recovered to win the final Test 13–6 to draw the series. On returning to New Zealand, Davis was selected for the All Blacks for the last time. He played in three Tests against the touring Australians; the series was won by the All Blacks two Tests to one. He was not selected for the All Blacks again, and finished his career with 25 games for the side, including 10 Tests.

1959 was Davis' final season of first-class rugby. He finished his career for Auckland, and played for the Māori against the touring British Lions. The New Zealanders lost the game 12–6, but did prevent the Lions from scoring any tries—the only time this was achieved on tour. After retiring from rugby Davis continued to be involved as a coach and selector with both his club side Marist, and also the Māori All Blacks in the 1960s. He was eventually awarded his Test cap at a capping ceremony in 2010, 58 years after first playing for the All Blacks.

Davis died on 2 March 2019.

== Sources ==
- "All Blacks' legends to receive caps". tvnz.co.nz. NZPA. 7 July 2010. Archived from the original on 14 July 2011.
- "Australia v New Zealand Maori at Brisbane, Jun 14, 1958". ESPNscrum.
- "Australia v New Zealand Maori at Sydney, Jun 28, 1958". ESPNscrum.
- "Australia v New Zealand Maori at Melbourne, Jul 5, 1958". ESPNscrum.
- Ihaka, James (17 April 2010). "Memories differ on game of shame". The New Zealand Herald.
- Knight, Lindsay. "Keith Davis". allblacks.com.
- "Maori told to throw match against Boks". The New Zealand Herald. NZPA. 13 April 2010.
- McLean, Terry (1959). Great Days in New Zealand Rugby. Wellington, New Zealand: A. H. & A. W. Reed.
- McLean, Terry (1959). "Maoris in Auckland Rugby". Te Ao Hou (27): 67–68.
- Mulholland, Malcolm (2009). Beneath the Māori Moon—An Illustrated History of Māori Rugby. Huia Publishers. ISBN 978-1-86969-305-3.
- Neazor, Paul (22 July 2011). "A History of the All Blacks v Fiji". skysport.co.nz.
- Tukukino, Kem (1956). "A Reportage of the Maori Springbok Match". Te Ao Hou (16): 17–19.

Awards
Preceded by Percy Erceg	Tom French Memorial; Māori rugby union player of the year 1952, 1953, 1954	Succeeded by Pat Walsh
