= Peter Smith (rugby union) =

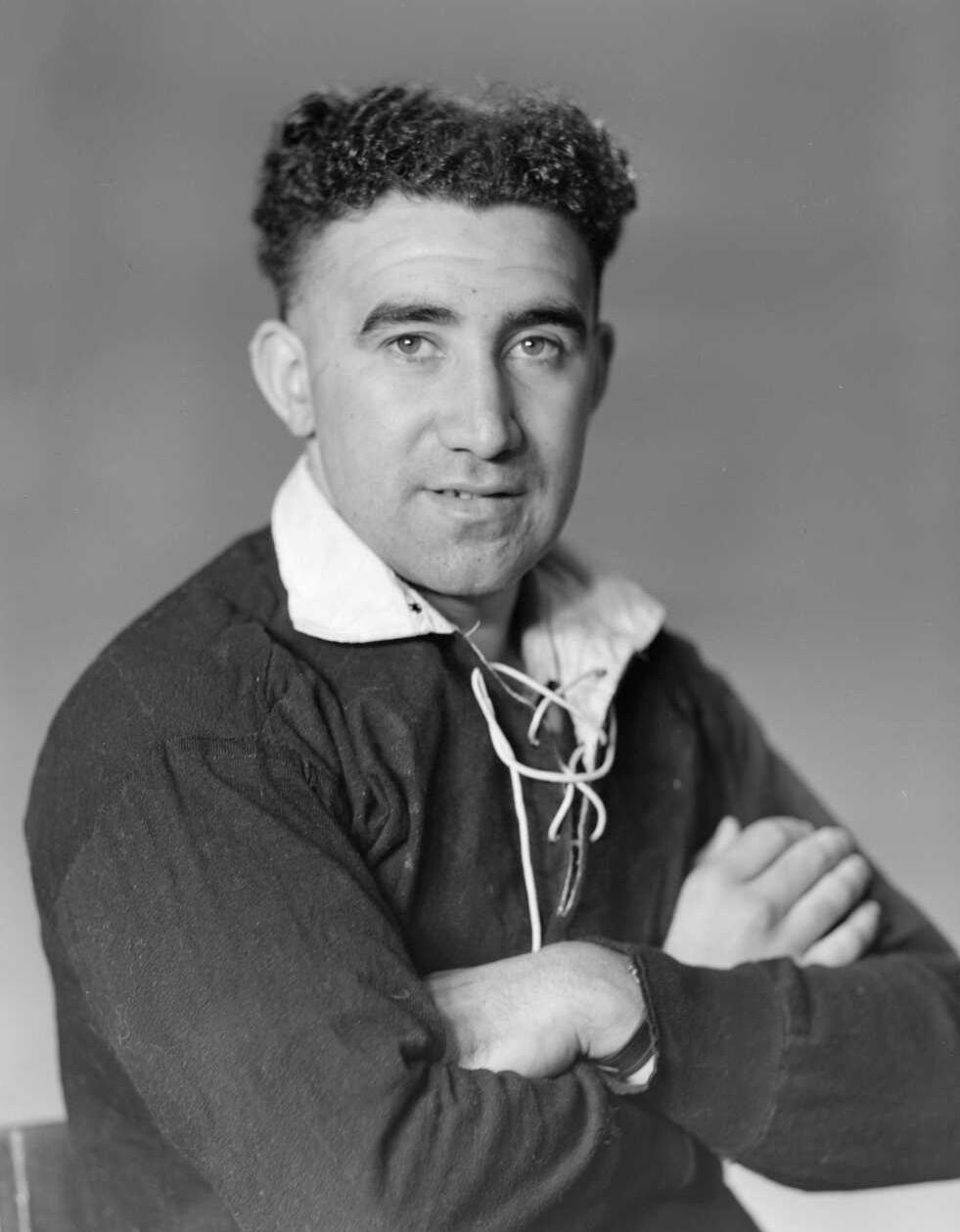
- Smith in 1949
- Born: 1 August 1924 Kaikohe, New Zealand
- Died: 26 January 1954 (aged 29) Opononi, New Zealand
- Height: 1.75 m (5 ft 9 in)
- Weight: 76 kg (168 lb)
- School: Kaikohe District High School
- Notable relative: Johnny Smith (brother)

Rugby union career
- Position: Second five-eighth
Amateur team(s)
Years	Team	Apps	(Points)
- Kaikohe
Provincial / State sides
Years	Team	Apps	(Points)
1946–51	North Auckland	18	
International career
Years	Team	Apps	(Points)
1946–51	New Zealand Māori	19	
1947	New Zealand	0	(0)

Peter Smith (1 August 1924 – 26 January 1954) was a New Zealand rugby union player. He was a member of the 1947 All Blacks team that toured Australia, but did not appear in any Test matches. He played second five-eighth.

== Personal life ==
Smith was born in Kaikohe and attended Kaikohe Primary and then Kaikohe District High School. He was one of three children. His father Leslie was a baker who had served in World War I and played rugby for both South Auckland and North Island Country. His mother, Niria Takiwira, belonged to the hapū Te Uri-o-Hua of Ngāpuhi.

His brother Johnny was also an All Black. Peter died in 1954, aged 29.

== Representative career ==
Smith played for North Auckland (now Northland) in 1946, 1947, 1950 and 1951. Affiliating to the Ngāpuhi iwi, Smith played for New Zealand Māori in 1946 and from 1949 to 1951, as well as appearing for a New Zealand Māori XV in 1945. He played for Tai Tokerau from 1946 to 1948 and in 1950.

=== All Black tour ===
Smith's single All Blacks tour was to Australia in 1947. He played three tour matches, but no tests. Against Combined Northern he scored four tries (12 points), his entire haul as an All Black.
