= Carlos Oteo =

Spain international rugby union player (born 1958)

- Born: Carlos Oteo Calatayud; 14 May 1958 (age 68) Madrid, Spain
- Height: 1.75 m (5 ft 9 in)
- Weight: 75 kg (165 lb)

Rugby union career
- Position: Centre
Senior career
Years	Team	Apps	(Points)
198?-198?	CAU Madrid RC		
International career
Years	Team	Apps	(Points)
1982–1984	Spain	5	(0)

Carlos Oteo Calatayud (born 14 May 1958) is a Spanish former rugby union player who played as a centre or winger. He spent his club career playing for CAU Madrid R.C. and was an international for the Spain national rugby union team, famously featuring in the historic match against the Māori All Blacks in 1982.

== Club and international career ==
Oteo developed his entire top-level career at CAU Madrid, becoming a prominent back for the side in the División de Honor de Rugby. His performances earned him call-ups to the Spain national team (the XV del León), playing several international fixtures during the early 1980s, including FIRA Trophy tournament games against European nations like Belgium.

== Post-retirement and administrative career ==
After retiring from playing, Oteo remained heavily involved in rugby governance. He served as the First Vice President of the Madrid Rugby Federation (Federación de Rugby de Madrid). In 2024, he joined a high-profile committee bid alongside former national team coach Santiago Santos to renew the regional federation's management.
