= Peter Burke (rugby union) =

Peter Burke ONZM
- Born: Peter Standish Burke; 22 September 1927 Tauranga, New Zealand
- Died: 2 October 2017 (aged 90) New Plymouth, New Zealand
- Height: 1.88 m (6 ft 2 in)
- Weight: 97 kg (214 lb)
- School: Tauranga Boys' College

Rugby union career
- Position(s): Lock; Number 8
Provincial / State sides
Years	Team	Apps	(Points)
1946	Bay of Plenty		
1947	Auckland		
1948–1959	Taranaki	117	
International career
Years	Team	Apps	(Points)
1951–1957	New Zealand	3	(0)
Coaching career
- Years: Team
- 1963–1965: Taranaki (assistant)
- 1981–1982: New Zealand

Peter Standish Burke ONZM (22 September 1927 – 2 October 2017) was a New Zealand rugby union player, coach and administrator. A lock and number 8, Burke represented Bay of Plenty, Auckland and Taranaki at a provincial level, and was a member of the New Zealand national side, the All Blacks, in 1951, 1955 and 1957. He played 12 matches for the All Blacks including three internationals.

After retiring as a player, Burke went on to contribute to rugby as a selector, coach and administrator. He was a Taranaki selector from 1960 to 1968, and assistant coach of that union from 1963 to 1965. He also served as president of the Taranaki Rugby Union. From 1970 to 1975 he was a North Island selector and he became a New Zealand selector in 1978. Burke was the All Blacks coach during the 1981 Springbok Tour and also for the tour of Romania and France later that year. In 1994 he served as president of the New Zealand Rugby Union.

In the 1997 Queen's Birthday Honours, Burke was appointed an Officer of the New Zealand Order of Merit, for services to rugby.

The Peter Burke Trophy, named in Burke's honour, is contested between the Bay of Plenty and Taranaki representative rugby union teams.

Sporting positions
Preceded by Eric Watson	All Blacks coach 1981–1982	Succeeded by Bryce Rope
