= Western Suburbs RFC (Wellington) =

NZ rugby union club, based in Wellington

Wests Roosters
Club information
- Full name: Western Suburbs Rugby Football Club
- Colours: Royal Blue, White, and Red
- Founded: 1982
- Website: westsrugby.org.nz

Current details
- Ground: Ian Galloway Park in Wilton, Wellington City, Wellington, New Zealand
- Competition: Wellington Premiership

The Western Suburbs RFC, or Wests Roosters, is a rugby union club based in Wellington, New Zealand. Wests is a constituent club of the Wellington Rugby Football Union. The club was founded in 1983 as an amalgamation of the Athletic, Karori and Onslow rugby clubs. Wests won the Jubilee Cup in 1998 and the Hardham Cup in 2000, and 2003.

== Location ==
Wests is based at Ian Galloway Park in Wilton, Wellington City, and features four full-size grounds and four junior grounds, club rooms and gymnasium with an indoor artificial surface for wet weather training.

== Club Membership ==
Wests was formerly one of the 12 Premier Clubs in Wellington, and fielded a number of senior teams. After a judicial issue, the premier team was removed from the top-tier competition. This then had a roll down effect and the senior part of the club was severely reduced. West's senior club in later years consisted of two teams; reserve grade (Mixed Veges) and Presidents teams.

The Wests's Juniors were in the top ten for size in New Zealand with over 500 members (children under 13 years) from the local region including the Brooklyn, Karori, Ngaio, Khandallah, Wilton, Wadestown and Northland areas.

== Notable players ==
International and Super Rugby players:

- Scott Crichton – All Black (1983–85)
- Alama Ieremia – Samoan international (1992–93), and All Black (1994–2000) playing 30 tests
- Filo Tiatia – All Black (2000)
- Rodney So'oialo – All Black (2002–09). 62 Tests (5 tests as captain)
- Kane Thompson – Samoan international (2007– ), and Chiefs super rugby (2012)
- Scott Fuglistaller – Highlanders (2012), and Melbourne Rebels (2013– ) super rugby
- Norm Hadley - Canadian International (1989-1993)
