= Murray Davie =

- Born: Murray Geoffrey Davie; 19 September 1956 (age 70) Christchurch, New Zealand
- Height: 1.88 m (6 ft 2 in)
- Weight: 108 kg (238 lb)
- School: Burnside High School
- Occupation: Publican

Rugby union career
- Position: Prop
Provincial / State sides
Years	Team	Apps	(Points)
1978–88	Canterbury	123	
International career
Years	Team	Apps	(Points)
1983	New Zealand	1	(4)

Murray Geoffrey Davie (born 19 September 1956) is a former New Zealand rugby union and water polo player.

A rugby union prop, Davie represented Canterbury at a provincial level, and was a member of the New Zealand national side, the All Blacks, on the 1983 tour of Scotland and England. He played five matches for the All Blacks including one test match as a substitute. He was also a New Zealand international water polo representative.

Davie attended Burnside High School in Christchurch from 1969 to 1971.
