= Tom French Cup =

NZ Maori rugby union player of the year award

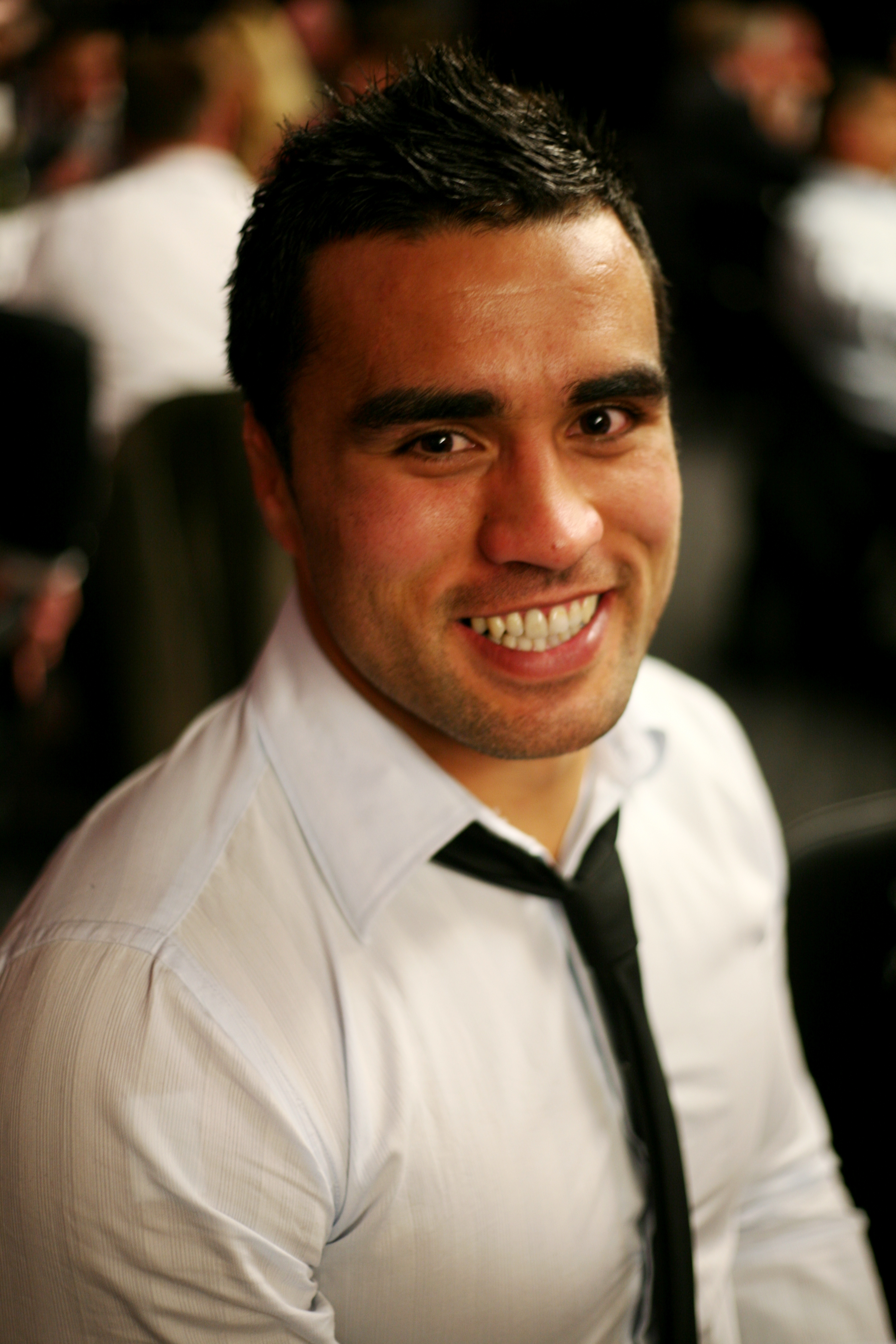
Waikato player Liam Messam won the Tom French Cup in 2012.

In rugby union, the Tom French Cup is an honour awarded by New Zealand Rugby Union (NZRU) to the Tom French Memorial Māori player of the year. The cup has been awarded annually since 1949, when it was donated to the New Zealand Māori coach Tom French while the team was on tour in Australia. French had represented Buller provincially, and was selected for New Zealand Maori in 1911. After the First World War, where he lost an arm at Passchendaele, French continued his involvement in rugby by serving as both a selector and administrator. In 1957 he was made a life member of the NZRU.

The inaugural recipient in 1949 was Johnny Smith, who played for New Zealand's national team the All Blacks, and captained them in two Tests that year. Keith Davis was the Tom French Cup winner in 1952–54, and played extensively for both the All Blacks and New Zealand Māori; his time with the Māori included matches against both South Africa in 1956, and the British Lions in 1959. The record for cup wins is held by Sid Going, who played half-back for both New Zealand Māori and the All Blacks, and was awarded the cup six times; won consecutively between 1967 and 1972. Tane Norton won the cup in 1973 and 74, and went on to finish his playing career as All Black captain—his 27 international Test caps were earned consecutively. 1987 Rugby World Cup winner Buck Shelford was awarded the cup in 1985, and 1987–89; Shelford captained North Harbour, New Zealand Māori, and the All Blacks. During his 14 Tests as captain of the All Blacks the team never lost. When Shelford was eventually dropped from the All Blacks, he was replaced at number eight by fellow Tom French Cup recipient Zinzan Brooke. Brooke was awarded the cup in both 1992 and 1994, and also captained the Blues to the 1996 and 1997 Super 12 titles.

Carl Hayman was awarded the Tom French Cup in both 2004 and 2006, and was instrumental in helping New Zealand Māori defeat the British and Irish Lions for the first time in 2005. Hayman played 45 Test matches for the All Blacks. Fellow All Black Piri Weepu won the cup in both 2008 and 2011. In 2011 he was a member of the World Cup winning All Blacks side, and was named man of the match in New Zealand's quarter-final victory over Argentina.

== Winners ==
Year	Name	Province
1949	Johnny Smith	North Auckland
1950	Manahi Paewai	North Auckland
1951	Percy Erceg	Auckland
1952	Keith Davis	Auckland
1953	Keith Davis	Auckland
1954	Keith Davis	Auckland
1955	Pat Walsh	South Auckland Counties
1956	Bill Gray	Bay of Plenty
1957	Muru Walters	North Auckland
1958	Pat Walsh	Counties
1959	Bill Wordley	King Country
1960	Mack Herewini	Auckland
1961	Vic Yates	North Auckland
1962	Waka Nathan	Auckland
1963	Mack Herewini	Auckland
1964	Ron Rangi	Auckland
1965	Ron Rangi	Auckland
1966	Waka Nathan	Auckland
1967	Sid Going	North Auckland
1968	Sid Going	North Auckland
1969	Sid Going	North Auckland
1970	Sid Going	North Auckland
1971	Sid Going	North Auckland
1972	Sid Going	North Auckland
1973	Tane Norton	Canterbury
1974	Tane Norton	Canterbury
1975	Bill Bush	Canterbury
1976	Kent Lambert	Manawatu
1977	Bill Osborne	Wanganui
1978	Eddie Dunn	North Auckland
1979	Vance Stewart	Canterbury
1980	Hika Reid	Bay of Plenty
1981	Frank Shelford	Bay of Plenty
1982	Steven Pokere	Southland
1983	Hika Reid	Bay of Plenty
1984	Mike Clamp	Wellington
1985	Buck Shelford	North Harbour
1986	Frano Botica	North Harbour
1987	Buck Shelford	North Harbour
1988	Buck Shelford	North Harbour
1989	Buck Shelford	North Harbour
1990	Steve McDowall	Auckland
1991	John Timu	Otago
1992	Zinzan Brooke	Auckland
1993	Arran Pene	Otago
1994	Zinzan Brooke	Auckland
1995	Robin Brooke	Auckland
1996	Errol Brain	Counties Manukau
1997	Mark Mayerhofler	Canterbury
1998	Tony Brown	Otago
1999	Norm Maxwell	Canterbury
2000	Daryl Gibson	Canterbury
2001	Caleb Ralph	Canterbury
2002	Carlos Spencer	Auckland
2003	Carlos Spencer	Auckland
2004	Carl Hayman	Otago
2005	Rico Gear	Nelson Bays
2006	Carl Hayman	Otago
2007	Daniel Braid	Auckland
2008	Piri Weepu	Wellington
2009	Zac Guildford	Hawke's Bay
2010	Hosea Gear	Wellington
2011	Piri Weepu	Wellington
2012	Liam Messam	Waikato
2013	Liam Messam	Waikato
2014	Aaron Smith	Manawatu
2015	Nehe Milner-Skudder	Manawatu
2016	Dane Coles	Wellington
2017	Rieko Ioane	Auckland
2018	Codie Taylor	Canterbury
2019	Sarah Hirini	Manawatu
2020	Ash Dixon	Hawke's Bay
2021	Sarah Hirini	Manawatū
2022	Ruahei Demant	Auckland
2023	Aaron Smith	Manawatū
2024	Tyrel Lomax	Tasman
2025	Portia Woodman-Wickliffe	Northland

== Sources ==
- "2009 Steinlager Rugby Awards' winners". Television New Zealand. 17 December 2009. Archived from the original on 7 October 2012.
- Frew, Garry (30 October 2012). "Smith, John Burns". Dictionary of New Zealand Bibliography.
- Hinton, Mark (9 October 2011). "Tough battle as All Blacks forced to dig deep by plucky Argentina".
- "Kaino rewarded for big year at awards". The New Zealand Herald. 1 December 2011. Archived from the original on 3 April 2013.
- Knight, Lindsay. "Carl Hayman". New Zealand Rugby Museum.
- Knight, Lindsay. "Keith Davis". New Zealand Rugby Museum.
- Mulholland, Malcolm (2009). Beneath the Māori Moon – An Illustrated History of Māori Rugby. Huia Publishers. ISBN 978-1-86969-305-3.
- "Ray Watson, Liam Messam winners at Rugby Awards". Rotorua Daily Post. 14 December 2012.
- McKendry, Patrick (5 December 2013). "Read, All Blacks, Hansen scoop top NZ rugby awards". The New Zealand Herald.
- "Read named player of the year". Television New Zealand. 16 December 2010. Archived from the original on 18 December 2010.
