= Johnny Smith (rugby union) =

John Smith
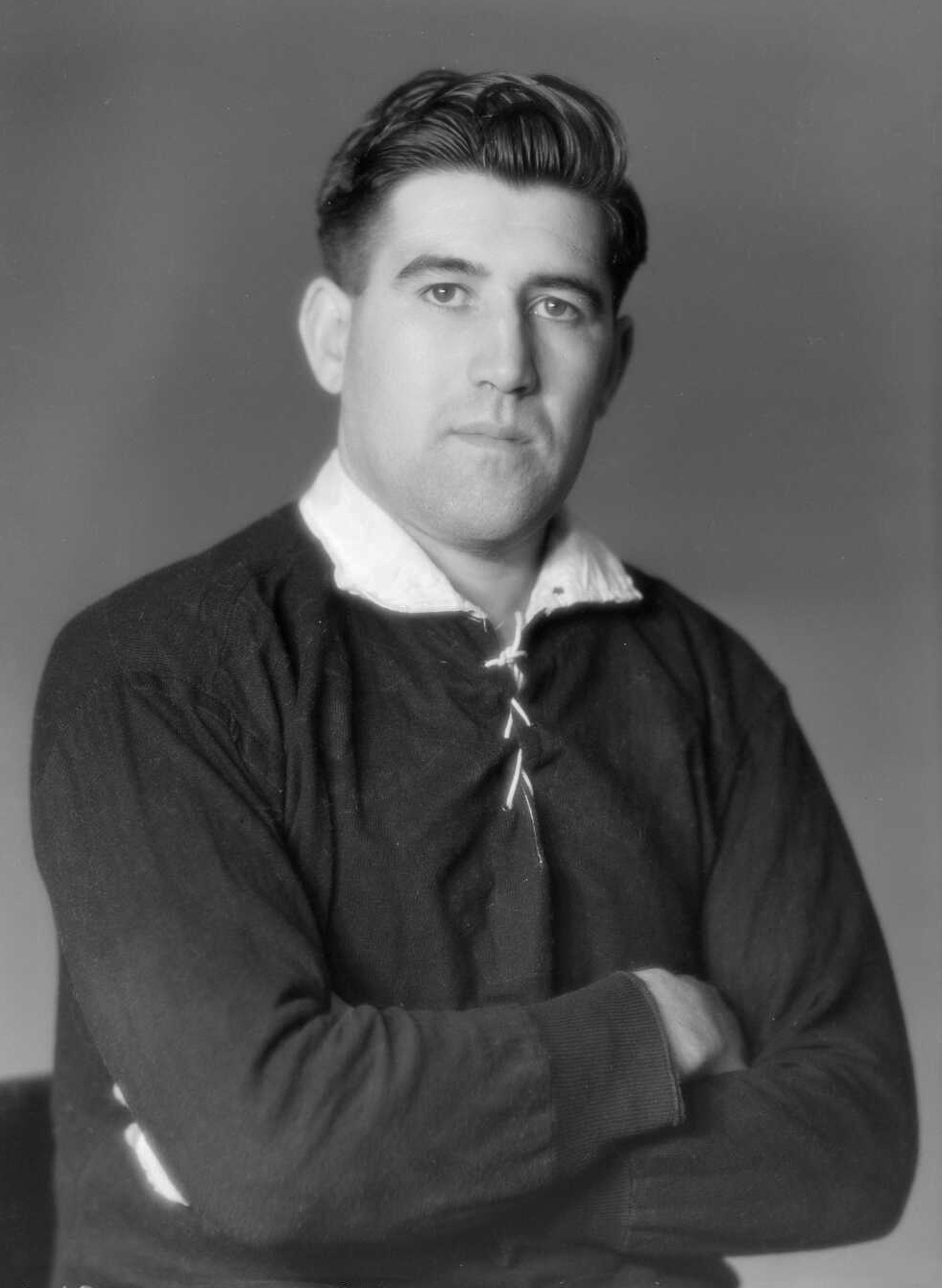
- Smith in 1949
- Born: John Burns Smith; 25 September 1922 Kaikohe, New Zealand
- Died: 3 December 1974 (aged 52) Auckland, New Zealand
- Height: 1.75 m (5 ft 9 in)
- Weight: 79 kg (174 lb; 12 st 6 lb)
- School: Kaikohe District High School
- Notable relative: Peter Smith (brother)

Rugby union career
- Position: Centre
Amateur team(s)
Years	Team	Apps	(Points)
- Kaikohe
Provincial / State sides
Years	Team	Apps	(Points)
1946–54	North Auckland	41	
International career
Years	Team	Apps	(Points)
1946–49	New Zealand	4	(6)

John Burns Smith (26 September 1922 – 3 December 1974) was a New Zealand rugby union player, soldier, sportsman and baker. He was an All Black captain, and despite only playing nine matches (including four tests) is recognised as a great. His 26 appearances for the Second New Zealand Expeditionary Force rugby team (known as the Kiwis), which toured the UK in 1946–47, earned him high praise. He also played for the New Zealand Māori, being of Ngāpuhi descent.

== All Black career ==
Smith only played nine matches for the All Blacks, including four tests. His entire All Black career consists of series in or against Australia in 1946, 1947, and 1949. There were no All Black tests in 1948, and the only other opponent New Zealand faced during Smith's time in the All Blacks was South Africa, in a series from which Māori players were excluded.

=== 1946 Australia tour of New Zealand ===
Smith played the Australians twice during this tour—first as captain of a victorious North Auckland side (32–19), then as a member of the first All Black side since 1938. At Carisbrook in Dunedin, Smith scored a try in a 31–8 test victory. He did not play in the second test two weeks later.

=== 1947 New Zealand tour of Australia ===
This nine-match tour was Smith's only trip away with the All Blacks. He made another single test appearance in a two-match test series.

=== 1949 Australia tour of New Zealand ===
The All Blacks toured apartheid South Africa in 1949 but Māori players, including Smith, were excluded from the squad. The rugby unions of New Zealand and South Africa, and the South African government, have since apologised for this selection policy which was implemented at the South Africans' request by the NZRFU, "claiming it did not want to subject them to possible reprisals". Smith's official All Black profile now attributes his non-selection to "the unforgivable weakness shown by New Zealand rugby in meeting South Africa's apartheid conditions".

While that team was away, Australia toured New Zealand, leading to the unusual situation of simultaneous All Black series in different countries. "The New Zealand Rugby Union ... decided that the 1949 matches against Australia would have full test status, even though the country's top 30 [white] players were in South Africa. One of the reasons for the decision was to not deprive test caps to three of the All Blacks, Johnny Smith, Ben Couch and Vince Bevan who were not considered for the South African tour because they were Maori. All three would surely have otherwise gone to South Africa."

Smith captained the All Black sides that faced Australia. Both tests were lost (including one on 3 September—the same day that the Springboks beat New Zealand in Durban). They were the last All Black matches that Smith played. He was selected to play Australia again in 1952, but withdrew through injury.

== North Auckland ==
Smith played 41 matches for North Auckland, his last in 1954. He captained the province regularly, including against Australia (1946) and the British Lions (1950). Against the Lions he nearly scored a try that would have won the game, but was controversially ruled to have knocked the ball on. He was captain later in 1950 when North Auckland won the Ranfurly Shield for the first time, defeating South Canterbury.

In 1956, Smith coached North Auckland, and also served as a selector.

== Recognition ==
In 1949 Smith was the first recipient of the Tom French Cup, awarded to the Māori player of the year.

The official All Blacks profile published for Smith states that "there is little argument that Smith rates among the greatest midfield players ever produced in New Zealand".

=== Posthumous recognition ===
In 2014, rugby writer Wynne Gray included Smith in his '100 Greatest All Blacks'.

Smith was recognised as Northland Legend of Sport at the Northland Sports Awards in 2005.

== Other sports ==
Smith's wide-ranging sporting ability led to a national junior tennis title in the 1938-39 doubles (with Allan Burns), appearances for the Northland cricket team, and success as an amateur golfer.

== Personal and family life ==
He was born in Kaikohe, New Zealand in 1922. He attended Kaikohe Primary and then Kaikohe District High School. He was one of three children. His father Leslie was a baker who had served in World War I and played rugby for both South Auckland and North Island Country. His mother, Niria Takiwira, belonged to the Te Uri-o-Hua hapū of Ngāpuhi. His brother Peter was also an All Black.

In 1946 he married Dorothy Robinson. They had four children, three of whom survived him (along with Dorothy) when he died in 1974. His son Glen won a national swimming title.

Awards
New award	Tom French Memorial; Māori rugby union player of the year 1949	Succeeded by Manahi Paewai
