= Wayne Neville =

- Born: Wayne Ronald Neville; 10 December 1954 (age 71) Waipukurau, New Zealand
- Height: 1.88 m (6 ft 2 in)
- Weight: 109 kg (240 lb)
- School: Dannevirke High School
- Occupation: Farmer

Rugby union career
- Position: Prop
Provincial / State sides
Years	Team	Apps	(Points)
1976–79, 1981	North Auckland	46	
International career
Years	Team	Apps	(Points)
1981	New Zealand	0	(0)

Wayne Ronald Neville (born 10 December 1954) is a former New Zealand rugby union player. A prop, Neville represented North Auckland at a provincial level, and was a member of the New Zealand national side, the All Blacks, on their 1981 tour of Romania and France. He played four matches on the tour but did not play in any internationals.
