= Albert Kewene =

New Zealand dentist (born c. 1939)

- Born: 1939 or 1940; Dannevirke, New Zealand
- Education: University of Otago
- Scientific career
- Thesis: Prevalence and severity of periodontal disease among first year university physical education students (1974)

Albert Manahi Kewene (born 1939 or 1940) is a retired New Zealand Māori dentist.

In 1965, he was the first Māori to become a registered dentist, and he was the first Māori to graduate in periodontics from Otago Medical School in 1974. Of Tainui descent, his uncle was Manahi Nitama Paewai. In the later part of his career he worked for Māori healthcare providers and served on Te Ao Marama, the New Zealand Māori Dental Association. Kewene retired in 2014.

Kewene was preceded in dentistry by Walter Morete, who was the first Māori to graduate with a Bachelor of Dental Surgery in 1928, before registration.
