= Alastair Robinson (rugby union) =

- Born: Alastair Garth Robinson; 5 November 1956 (age 70) Waipukurau, New Zealand
- Height: 1.94 m (6 ft 4 in)
- Weight: 100 kg (220 lb)
- School: Christ's College
- University: Lincoln College
- Occupation: Farmer

Rugby union career
- Position: Lock
Provincial / State sides
Years	Team	Apps	(Points)
1981–87	North Auckland	74	
International career
Years	Team	Apps	(Points)
1983	New Zealand	0	(0)

Alastair Garth Robinson (born 5 November 1956) is a former New Zealand rugby union player. A lock, Robinson represented North Auckland at a provincial level, and was a member of the New Zealand national side, the All Blacks, on their 1983 tour of Scotland and England. He played four matches for the All Blacks but did not appear in any tests.
