= 1949 Australia rugby union tour of New Zealand =

Summary
P	W	D	L
Total
12	11	0	1
Test match
2	2	0	0
Opponent
P	W	D	L
New Zealand
2	2	0	0

The 1949 Australia rugby union tour of New Zealand was a series of 12 rugby union matches played by the "Wallabies" in 1949. The Australians lost only one match, and won the Test series 2-0.

At the same time, a 30-man All Black squad was touring South Africa. On 3 September 1949, New Zealand lost two test matches on the same day - one in South Africa, the other at home to Australia.

"The New Zealand Rugby Union ... decided that the 1949 matches against Australia would have full test status, even though the country's top 30 players were in South Africa. One of the reasons for the decision was to not deprive test caps to three of the All Blacks, Johnny Smith, Ben Couch and Vincent Bevan who were not considered for the South African tour because they were Māori (although Bevan was not regarded as eligible for the Māori All Blacks). All three would surely have otherwise gone to South Africa (also probably Ron Bryers and Nau Cherrington)."

== Matches ==
Scores and results list Australia's points tally first.

Opposing Team	For	Against	Date	Venue	Status
King Country	24	6	17 August 1949	Taumarunui Domain, Taumarunui	Tour match
Bay of Plenty	35	8	21 August 1949	Whakatane Field, Whakatāne	Tour match
Poverty Bay / East Coast	20	12	24 August 1949	Rugby Park, Gisborne	Tour match
Wairarapa	21	14	27 August 1949	Memorial Park, Masterton	Tour match
Manawatu / Horowhenua	29	6	31 August 1949	Showgrounds, Palmerston North	Tour match
New Zealand	11	6	3 September 1949	Athletic Park, Wellington	Test match
Combined XV	14	8	7 September 1949	Lansdowne Park, Blenheim	Tour match
West Coast-Buller	15	17	10 September 1949	Rugby Park, Greymouth	Tour match
Ashburton / South Canterbury / North Otago	9	0	14 September 1949	Centennial Park, Oamaru	Tour match
Southland	15	10	17 September 1949	Rugby Park, Invercargill	Tour match
Canterbury	16	12	21 September 1949	Lancaster Park, Christchurch	Tour match
New Zealand	16	9	24 September 1949	Eden Park, Auckland	Test match

== Bibliography ==
- Vivian Jenkins, ed. (1979). Rothmans Rugby Yearbook 1979–80. Rothmans Publications Ltd. ISBN 0-354-09087-9.

All found on link
