= Robert Kururangi =

New Zealand rugby union player (1957–2026)

- Born: 4 July 1957 Gisborne, New Zealand
- Died: 30 September 2026 (aged 69)
- Height: 1.78 m (5 ft 10 in)
- Weight: 83 kg (183 lb)
- School: Gisborne Boys' High School

Rugby union career
- Position: Wing
Provincial / State sides
Years	Team	Apps	(Points)
1977–1988	Counties	98	(195)
International career
Years	Team	Apps	(Points)
1978	New Zealand	0	(0)
1982	New Zealand Māori	8	(24)

Robert Kururangi (4 July 1957 – 30 September 2026) was a New Zealand rugby union player.

== Early life and family ==
Born in Gisborne on 4 July 1957, Kururangi was educated at Gisborne Boys' High School where he was a member of the school's 1st XV rugby team in 1973 and 1974. His father, Hemara (Bo) Kururangi played representative rugby for East Coast between 1957 and 1962.

Kururangi was a soldier in the New Zealand Army.

== Rugby union career ==
A wing, Kururangi played club rugby for Ardmore. He represented Counties at a provincial level between 1977 and 1988, playing 98 games and scoring 48 tries. He was part of the Counties team that won the 1979 First Division.

A New Zealand Juniors representative in 1978, Kururangi was then selected for the New Zealand national side, the All Blacks, on their 1978 tour of Britain and Ireland. He played eight matches, scoring four tries, on that tour, but did not appear in any internationals. The test spots on the wing were filled by Stu Wilson, Bryan Williams and Brian Ford.

Kururangi was an All Black trialist in 1979 and also represented the North Island and New Zealand Barbarians in 1982.

In a 1982 Ranfurly Shield challenge against Canterbury, Kururangi appeared to be heading for the match-winning try towards the end of the match, only to be called back due to the Counties midfield being offside. Robbie Deans kicked a penalty goal to draw the match 15-15, which was Canterbury's first defence and they went on to hold the Shield for a then record of almost three years.

Kururangi also took part in the 1982 New Zealand Māori rugby union tour of Wales and Spain.

== Death ==
Kururangi died on 30 September 2026, at the age of 69.
