= Buck Shelford =

New Zealand rugby union player (born 1957)

Sir Wayne Shelford KNZM MBE
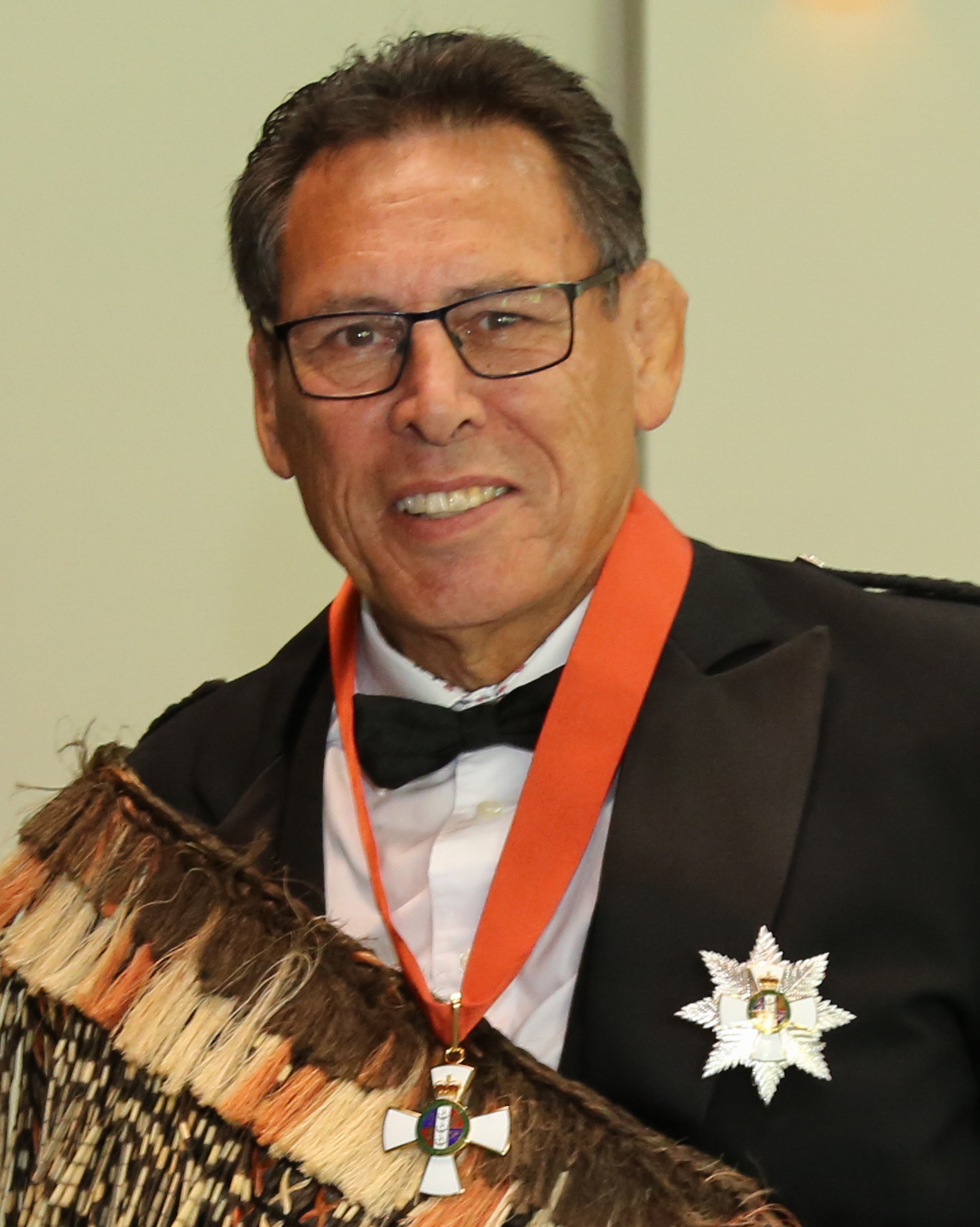
- Shelford in 2022
- Born: Wayne Thomas Shelford; 13 December 1957 (age 68) Rotorua, New Zealand
- Height: 1.89 m (6 ft 2 1/2 in)
- Weight: 107 kg (16 st 12 lb)
- School: Western Heights High School
- Notable relative(s): Darrel Shelford (brother); Frank Shelford (uncle); Adrian Shelford (cousin); Exia Shelford (cousin); Kyle Shelford (2nd cousin)

Rugby union career
- Position: Number eight
Amateur team(s)
Years	Team	Apps	(Points)
1974–1991	North Shore		
1985–1986	Northampton		
1991–1993	Rugby Roma		
Provincial / State sides
Years	Team	Apps	(Points)
1982–1985	Auckland		
1985–1991	North Harbour		
International career
Years	Team	Apps	(Points)
- New Zealand Navy
1986	New Zealand Cavaliers		
1982–1990	New Zealand Māori		
1986–1990	New Zealand	22	(20)
Coaching career
- Years: Team
- 1997–2002: North Harbour
- 2002–2003: Saracens

Sir Wayne Thomas Shelford KNZM MBE (born 13 December 1957) is a New Zealand former rugby union player and coach who represented and captained New Zealand (the All Blacks) in the late 1980s. Nicknamed "Buck", he played as a number eight for Auckland, North Harbour, Northampton and Rugby Roma.

Shelford toured South Africa with the unofficial New Zealand Cavaliers in 1986. He made his debut for the All Blacks later that year and went on to win 22 caps. He was part of the team that won the 1987 Rugby World Cup. Shelford captained the All Blacks from 1987, and the team was undefeated until he was controversially dropped in 1990. He is credited with revitalising the performance of the All Blacks' traditional "Ka Mate" haka in the 1980s.

After retiring, he coached North Harbour and English club Saracens.

== Career ==
After playing for Western Heights High School First XV, Shelford was selected for the Bay of Plenty Secondary Schools and Auckland age grade sides, and made his Auckland provincial debut in 1982. Shelford enlisted in the Royal New Zealand Navy as a physical training instructor (PTI), and during this time also played rugby for the Navy team. In 1985, when the North Harbour Rugby Union was created, he moved with it as his club side was a member. This was the same year he was first selected for the All Blacks, for the later abandoned South Africa tour.

Shelford's first game for the All Blacks was against Club Atlético San Isidro in Buenos Aires on 12 October 1985. He then joined the unauthorised Cavaliers' tour of South Africa in 1986, which included 28 of the 30 players selected for the original tour.

Shelford made his Test debut for the All Blacks later that year against France in a 19–7 victory in Toulouse, and then was a notable victim of the infamous "Battle of Nantes" in the second Test. Roughly 20 minutes into the match, he was caught at the bottom of a rather aggressive ruck, and a French boot kicked his groin, ripping his scrotum and leaving one testicle hanging free. He also lost four teeth in the process. After discovering the injury to his scrotum, he calmly asked the physiotherapist to stitch up the tear and returned to the field before a blow to his head left him concussed. He was substituted and watched the remainder of the game from the grandstand where he witnessed the All Blacks lose 16–3.

In 1987, the first Rugby World Cup was held in New Zealand. Shelford played in five of the six All Blacks games and was a member of the team that won the final against France 29–9. He was involved in an incident during the semi-final match against Wales that saw Huw Richards become the first player to be sent off in the tournament. Richards punched the All Black lock Gary Whetton after a loose scrum and Shelford reacted in defence of his teammate, landing a blow that knocked Richards to the ground. Shelford escaped punishment while Richards left the field.

Shelford took over as All Black captain after the World Cup, first captaining the side during the 1987 tour of Japan. During his captaincy from 1987 to 1990, the All Blacks did not lose a game, only drawing once against Australia in 1988.

Upon becoming captain, Shelford brought his teammates to Te Aute College, a Māori school, to see the students perform a traditional haka. Although the All Blacks had been performing the haka at the start of their matches since the team's inception, it was Shelford who taught them the proper way to perform the "Ka Mate" haka. Shelford has said that the All Blacks had previously done the haka in a way that showed little understanding or training, and with the support of a former All Black, Hika Reid, stressed the importance of correctly learning the tikanga, words and actions, noting that the key was helping the European members of the team to embrace the change. The All Blacks performed the haka for the first time in New Zealand at the 1987 Rugby World Cup.

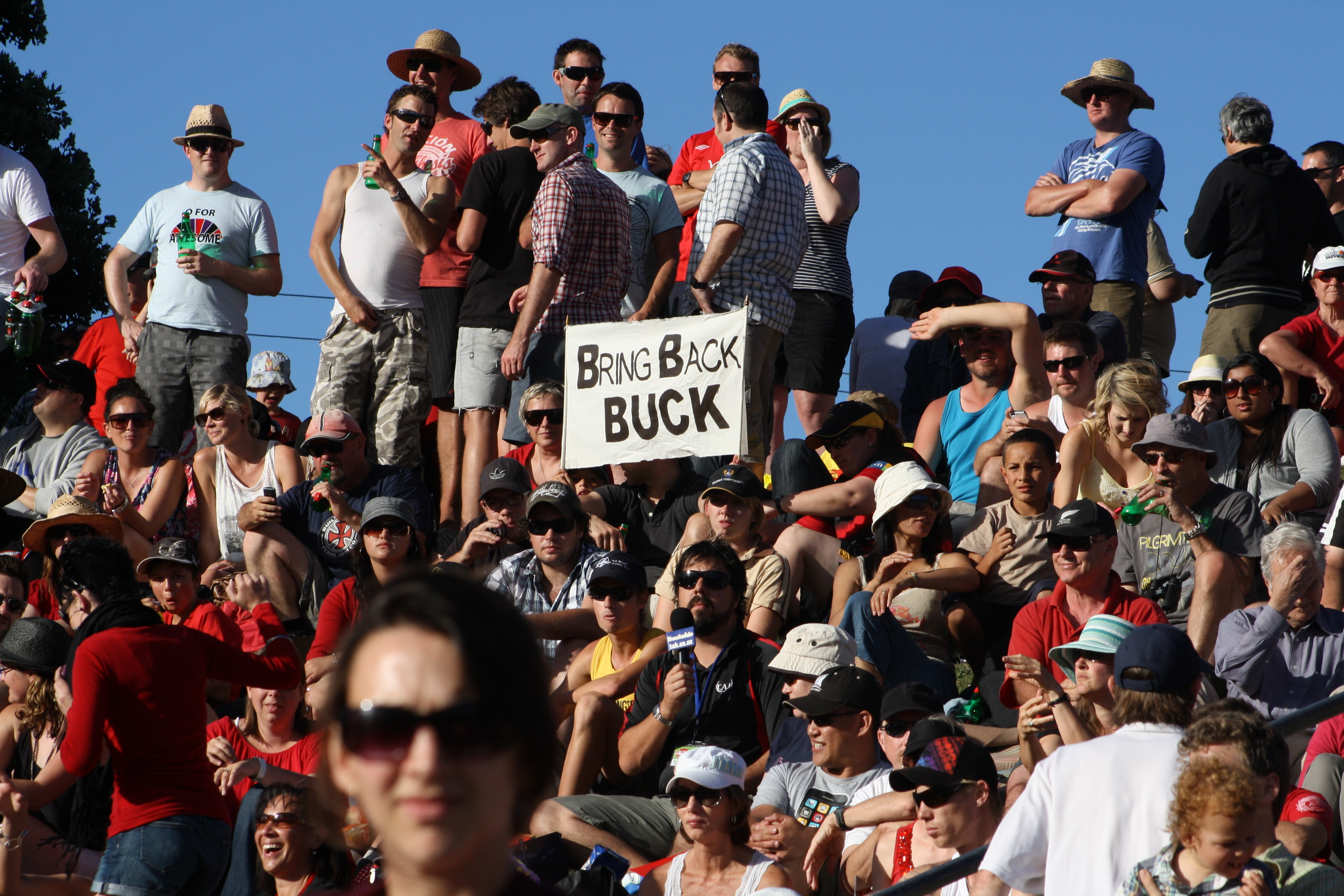
Bring Back Buck sign at Fill The Basin charity cricket event

In 1990, the All Blacks' selectors decided that Shelford was not up to the standard for the team and he was controversially dropped after the test series against Scotland. The general public were unhappy with this decision, especially when the All Blacks lost the third test of their next series against Australia, ending a 17-test winning streak (and 49 game streak including non-tests). After this, fans started appearing at games with signs saying "Bring Back Buck". Shelford said he had "no hard feelings" about being dropped and that he had spoken with the then selector, Alex Wyllie, who expressed a "few regrets" about his decision.

Although Shelford never regained his place in the All Blacks side, he was the captain of the New Zealand XV that played Romania in the Soviet Union and New Zealand B team that beat Australia B in 1991. He played 48 All Blacks games including 22 tests and captained the side 31 times, including 14 tests. He also scored 22 tries in total in his All Blacks career.

Shelford moved to England to play for Northampton, helping to revitalise a team languishing at the lower end of the first division and inspiring them to their first Pilkington Cup final. He retired from playing all rugby in 1995 after a spell at the Rugby Roma in the Italian Championship and coached for some time in Britain, including spells at Saracens and Rugby Lions. He returned to New Zealand and was the assistant coach of the North Harbour team in 1997 and coach in 1998. Currently, Shelford is coaching at his former club, North Shore in Devonport.

In 2020, he became the host, assistant coach and emergency player for All Blacks Alumni in Match Fit, a reality documentary series to train retired All Blacks back into shape against the current New Zealand Barbarians squad of former internationals. He reprised the role in 2021/22 (aired 2022).

== Honours ==
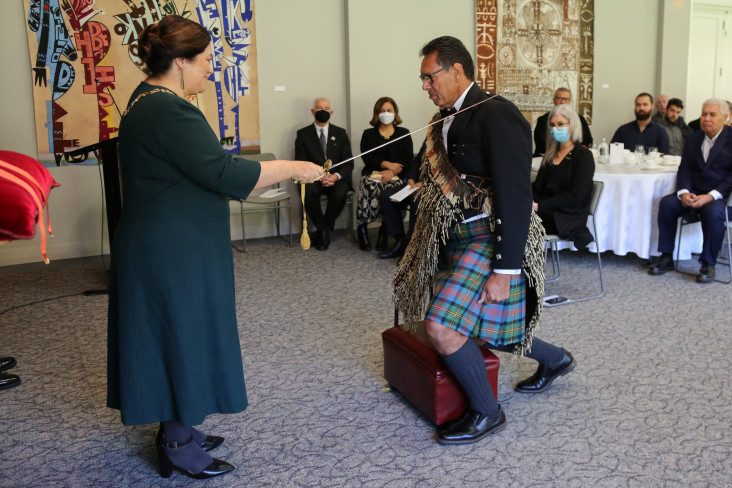
Shelford's investiture as a Knight Companion of the New Zealand Order of Merit by the governor-general, Dame Cindy Kiro, at Government House, Auckland, on 28 May 2022

In the 1991 New Year Honours, Shelford was appointed a Member of the Order of the British Empire, for services to rugby. In the 2021 Queen's Birthday Honours, Shelford was appointed a Knight Companion of the New Zealand Order of Merit, for services to rugby and the community. Shelford told Liam Napier of The New Zealand Herald, "[the award is] a great accolade...I'll wear it with pride for the family and all the organisations I work with. They'll carry that with them because they're my biggest supporters."

== Personal life ==
Shelford's iwi is Ngāpuhi. He and his wife, Joanne, have two children, Lia (born 1981) and Eruera (born 1985), and also adopted his godson Mitchell Haapu (born 1987).

On 23 June 2007, Shelford revealed that he was receiving treatment for the form of cancer known as lymphoma. He told Newstalk ZB's Murray Deaker that he wanted his privacy respected as he focused on his recovery and said he would not be making any further personal statements. He recovered fully.

In 2011, Shelford was studying at Massey University in Albany, Auckland.

In 2021, Shelford was one of the castaways on TVNZ's original series Celebrity Treasure Island. He was eliminated by Edna Swart before the finale, finishing in fourth place.

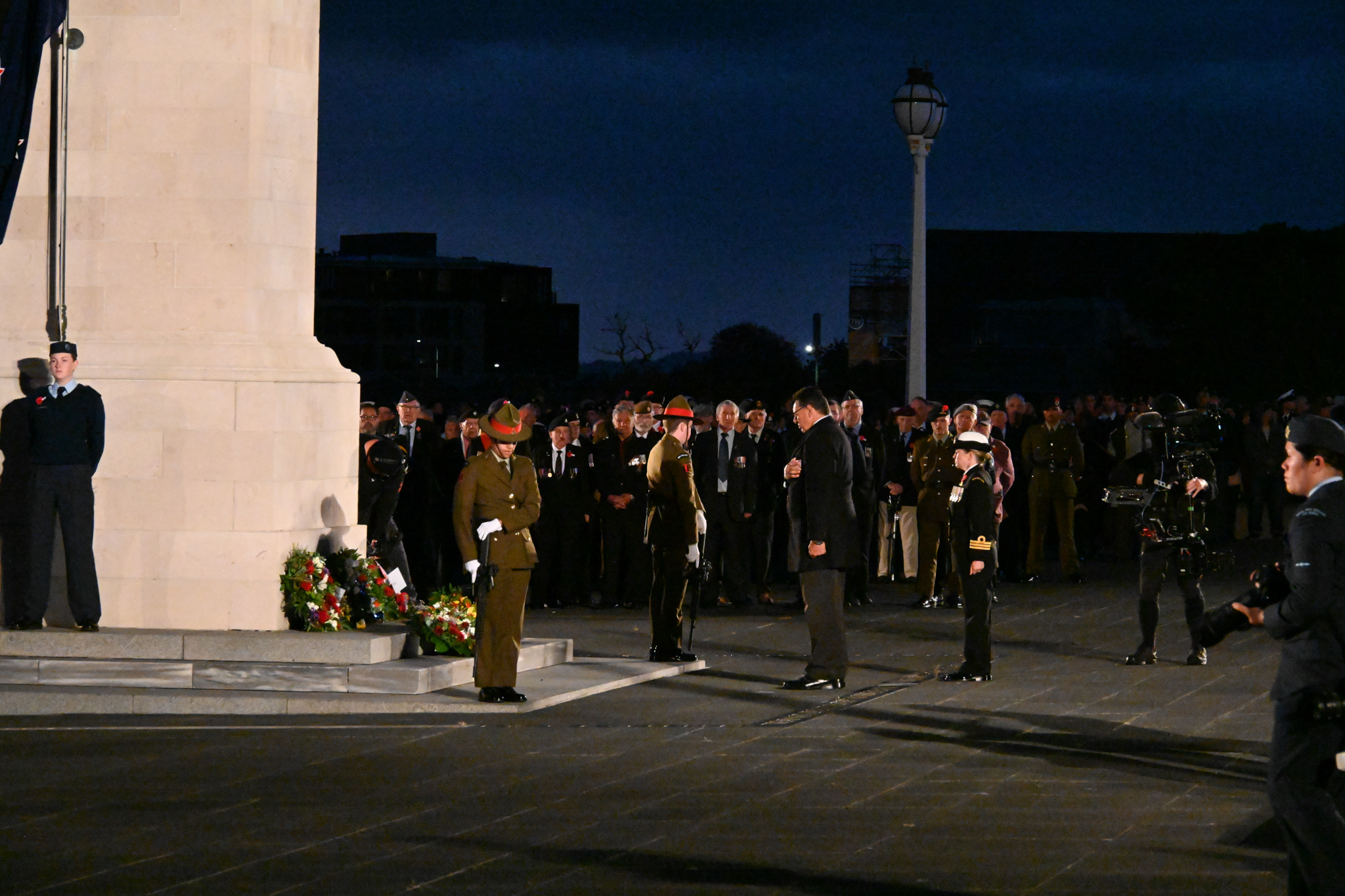
Shelford lays a wreath during the dawn service at the Auckland Cenotaph, Anzac Day, 2025

In 2022, Shelford was elected national president of the Royal New Zealand Returned and Services' Association.

Sporting positions
Preceded by David Kirk	All Blacks Captain; 1988–1990	Succeeded by Gary Whetton
Awards
Preceded by Mike Clamp	Tom French Memorial; Māori rugby union player of the year 1985; 1987, 1988, 1989	Succeeded by Frano Botica
Preceded by Frano Botica	Tom French Memorial; Māori rugby union player of the year 1985; 1987, 1988, 1989	Succeeded by Steve McDowall
