= Brian Morrissey (rugby union) =

- Born: Brian Lewis Morrissey; 14 September 1952 (age 74) Putāruru, New Zealand
- Height: 1.88 m (6 ft 2 in)
- Weight: 95 kg (209 lb)
- School: Tokoroa High School
- Occupation: Real estate agent

Rugby union career
- Position: Loose forward
Provincial / State sides
Years	Team	Apps	(Points)
1975–82	Waikato	56	
International career
Years	Team	Apps	(Points)
1981	New Zealand	0	(0)

Brian Lewis Morrissey (born 14 September 1953) is a former New Zealand rugby union player. A loose forward, Morrissey represented Waikato at a provincial level, and was a member of the New Zealand national side, the All Blacks, on the 1981 tour of Romania and France. He played three matches for the All Blacks but did not appear in any internationals.
