= Sacred Heart College, Auckland =

Sacred Heart College (Auckland)
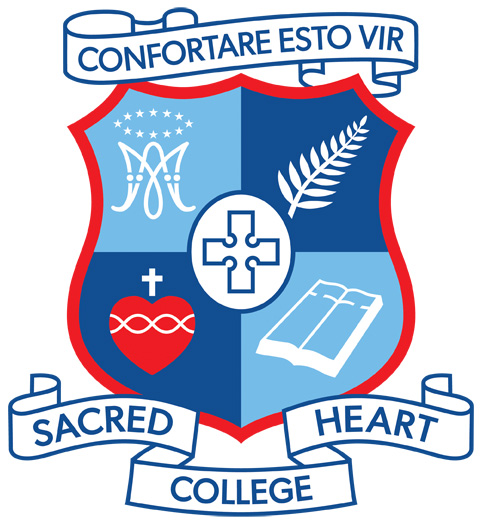

Location
- 250 West Tamaki Road; Glendowie; Auckland 1071; New Zealand; 36.8686°S 174.8720°E

Information
- Type: State-integrated; Day & boarding Secondary school
- Motto: Latin: Confortare Esto Vir (Take Courage And Act Manfully)
- Religious affiliation: Roman Catholic Marist
- Patron saint: St Marcellin Champagnat
- Established: 1903; 123 years ago
- Founder: Marist Brothers
- Ministry of Education Institution no.: 59
- Chairperson: Matthew Harris
- Headmaster: Patrick Walsh
- Staff: 130
- Years: 7–13
- Gender: Boys-only
- Enrolment: 1,511 (July 2026)
- Language: English (Main)
- Campus size: 22 hectares
- Houses: Basil; Coolahan; Lenihan; Marcellin; Pompallier; Stephen
- Colours: Cambridge Blue; Oxford Blue; Red
- Socio-economic decile: 8P
- Publication: Confortare Magazine
- Former pupils: Old Boys
- Website: www.sacredheart.school.nz

Sacred Heart College is a state-integrated secondary school in Auckland, New Zealand. It is a Catholic, Marist College set on 22 hectares (54 acres) of land in Glen Innes.

== History ==
The college was opened on 21 June 1903, in Ponsonby, by the Marist Brothers. It is the oldest continuously existing Catholic boys' secondary school in Auckland although it has changed its location, moving to its current Glen Innes site in 1955. St Paul's College was founded on the old Sacred Heart College site in that same year. The Marist Brothers continue to have a presence in the school community. The headmaster role at the college was served solely by Marist Brothers up until 1993, when Brendan Schollum took the role; the college's first lay principal. In 2003, the college held its centennial celebrations, which included the opening of a new administration building, technology block and Year 7 and 8 Department, and in 2005 it celebrated 50 years of being at the Glen Innes site.

== Enrolment ==
As of July 2026, the school has a roll of 1,511 students, of which 196 (13.0%) identify as Māori.

As of 2026, the school has an Equity Index of 394, placing it amongst schools whose students have the fewest socioeconomic barriers to achievement (roughly equivalent to deciles 9 and 10 under the former socio-economic decile system).

== Academics ==
As a state-integrated school, Sacred Heart College follows the New Zealand Curriculum (NZC). In Years 12 to 13, students complete the National Certificate of Educational Achievement (NCEA), the main secondary school qualification in New Zealand.

Students in Year 11 complete the school's "Sacred Heart Certificate", which replaced the old NCEA Level 1 course the school used to offer. This course was implemented in 2024 (trialed in 2023) in response to NZQA "radically modifying" the Level 1 qualification. The Sacred Heart Certificate involves students completing assessments throughout the year in each subject, each assessment is graded as a percentage - all assessments are weighted and summed to create a final percentage grade for a subject.

== Sport ==
Sacred Heart offers a wide range of sporting options to its pupils, many competing at a national level. The Sacred Heart 1st XV remains the only team never to have been relegated from the 1A grade. In football the 1st XI team has gained the national title in 2018 and 2019. In Water Polo, 2020 saw the college claim the North Island Championship title at all three levels; senior, junior and intermediate.

Sacred Heart College offer a Sports Institute programme for boys in Years 7–10. This development programme is offered in basketball, cricket, football, rugby union, rowing, and water polo.

== Houses ==
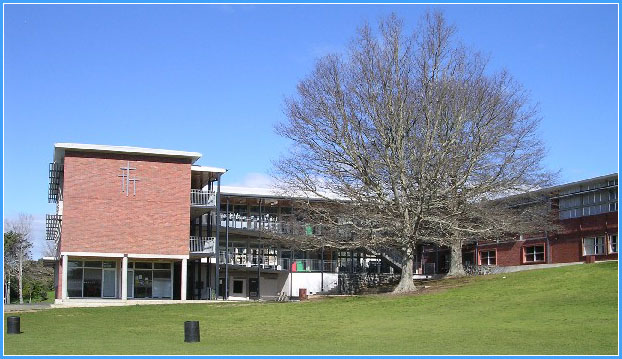
Photo of the school's year 7 and 8 Pompallier wing.

The houses of Sacred Heart College are named after either famous people in the Catholic and Marist community in New Zealand, or important figures in the school's history. The six houses are:

- Basil (Pātea)

Basil House is named after Brother Basil, who taught at the college for over 50 years, and was also the college's first principal.

- Coolahan (Kūrahana)

Coolahan House is named after the landowner who donated the land for the original site of the college in Ponsonby, now the site of St. Paul's College.

- Lenihan (Renihana)

Lenihan House is named after the Bishop of Auckland in 1903, who saw the need for a Catholic boys' school in the area and was a driving force in Sacred Heart's foundation.

- Marcellin (Mahirino)

Marcellin house is named after Marcellin Champagnat, founder of the Marist order.

- Pompallier (Pomaparie)

Pompallier house is named after Jean-Baptiste Pompallier (1802–1871), the first Catholic vicar apostolic and bishop to visit and be located in New Zealand (arrived 1838); first Catholic Bishop of Auckland (1848–1868).

- Stephen (Tipene)

Stephen House is named after Brother Stephen Coll FMS, a well known former teacher and Marist Brother at the college.

== Boarding hostel ==
The boarding hostel is home to roughly 160–170 boarders from all over New Zealand and from overseas.

== Controversies ==
=== Bullying ===
In 2019, New Zealand's Chief Ombudsman reported on cases of bullying complaints made in 2016. At the time, a recommendation was made to the board of trustees at the school to formally apologise for the way the complaints were handled and to review the school's harassment and bullying policies. These policies have been updated and are published on the college website.

Sacred Heart College's response to the bullying complaints was slammed by the Chief Ombudsman. Two students anonymously approached TVNZ 1 News claiming they had been bullied. One mother recalled a story when one child came up to her son, and said "go and commit suicide so I can piss on your grave." When asked if it had a "bullying problem", Sacred Heart College responded that the board of trustees accepted that the 2016 matter had not been well handled at the time. However changes had been made, along with the introduction of focused initiatives for a stronger, more caring college.

=== Concerns for student safety ===
In 2020, a report of an unidentified source of threat was made to the college, however after Police investigation, there was no evidence to suggest there was any validity.

In July 2022, Sacred Heart College was forced to close for a day after threats were made against pupils on social media.

=== Discrimination ===
Sacred Heart College has been criticised by New Zealand's Chief Ombudsman for declining in 2018 to offer an enrolment place to an autistic boy, using the excuse that he was "not Catholic enough." After an investigation, it was found that Sacred Heart College had ranked other non-Catholic prospective students higher than the autistic boy, raising questions around whether the school was actively discriminating against disabled persons. The Board of Trustees offered a statement of regret that anguish may have been caused, and accepted the need for compassion.

=== Drugs ===
In 2003, seven students were expelled for possessing and using marijuana on school grounds.

=== Marist Brothers allegations ===
As an organisation, the Marist Brothers has a long history of covering up sexual abuse allegations to protect its members.

Brother Giles Waters taught at Sacred Heart College in the 1980s. He has been subject to numerous sexual abuse allegations. While no evidence has yet emerged of abuse occurring at Sacred Heart College, it has been established that the Marist Brothers would have known of Brother Giles Walters' history at the time of his employment.

Brother Kenneth 'Bosco' Camden was Headmaster of Sacred Heart College from 1974 - 1981. In 1990, Brother Kenneth Camden was convicted of sexual abuse crimes. Despite the conviction, Brother Kenneth Camden's death was acknowledged by the college in 2014. Brother Kenneth Camden's time at Sacred Heart College continues to be celebrated on the Marist Brothers' website.

== Notable alumni ==
The official alumni group is the Sacred Heart College Old Boys Association. Some of these well-known men include:

=== Arts ===
- K O Arvidson – poet and academic
- Jonathan Brugh - Comedian and Actor
- Mike Chunn – musician
- Dan Davin – author, Rhodes Scholar
- Dave Dobbyn – musician
- Tim Finn – musician
- Neil Finn – musician
- Toa Fraser – writer and film director
- Jeffrey Grice – musician
- M K Joseph – poet and novelist
- Michael King – author, historian
- Brendhan Lovegrove – comedian
- Ivan Mercep – Architect (Officer of the New Zealand Order of Merit for services to architecture; awarded the Gold Medal of the New Zealand Institute of Architects in 2008)
- Ian Morris – musician
- Milan Mrkusich – artist and designer
- Vincent O'Sullivan – writer
- Tim Radford – journalist
- John Cowie Reid – founder of the Mercury Theatre, professor of English, writer
- Paolo Rotondo – actor, screenwriter
- Peter Urlich – musician

=== Broadcasting ===
- Dominic Bowden – TV presenter
- Pat Brittenden – broadcaster

=== Public service ===
- John Belgrave – Chief Ombudsman
- Brian Donnelly – Member of Parliament
- Neil Kirton – Member of Parliament; Associate Minister of Health and Minister of Customs.
- Sir James Henare – Maori Battalion WW2 leader, former National Party Minister / Member of Parliament.
- Ratu Sir Kamisese Mara – former inaugural Prime Minister of Fiji and President of Fiji following declaration of independence.
- Sir Anand Satyanand – Governor-General of New Zealand

=== Religion ===
- Reginald John Delargey (1914–1979) – Auxiliary Bishop of Auckland (1957–1970); Eighth Catholic Bishop Of Auckland (1970–1974); Fifth Archbishop of Wellington (1974–1979) (Cardinal).
- Denis Devcich – director of the Mother of God Brothers
- Patrick James Dunn (b. 1950) – Eleventh Catholic Bishop of Auckland (1994–2021)
- John Patrick Kavanagh (1913–1985) – Fourth Catholic Bishop of Dunedin (1949–1985).
- John Mackey (1918–2014) – Ninth Catholic Bishop of Auckland (1974–1983)
- Denzil Meuli (Pierre Denzil) (1926–2019) – priest of the Diocese of Auckland, writer, former editor of the Zealandia and a leading New Zealand traditionalist Catholic
- Owen Noel Snedden (1917–1981) – Auxiliary Bishop of Wellington (1962–1981); first Auckland-born priest to be ordained a bishop.

=== Sport ===
==== Cricket ====
- Fred Klaassen – cricket player for Netherlands
- Dale Phillips – cricketer
- Glenn Phillips – NZ Black Caps, Auckland Aces
- Matthew Quinn – cricket player NZ under 19, Auckland, New Zealand A, Essex

==== Rugby ====
- Ben Afeaki – rugby player, All Black
- Mark Anscombe – rugby union coach; currently head coach of the Canada national team
- Cyril Brownlie – rugby player, All Black
- Nathan Cleary – rugby league player, Penrith Panthers and NSW Blues
- Kieran Crowley – rugby player, All Black; former coach of the Canada national team, former coach of Benetton, coach of the Italy national team
- Greg Davis – Wallaby captain
- Percy Erceg – rugby player, All Black and New Zealand Maori selector
- Sean Fitzpatrick – rugby player, All Black captain
- Kurtis Haiu – rugby player
- Craig Innes – rugby player, All Black
- Wilfrid Kalaugher – teacher and athlete
- Solomone Kata – Tonga rugby league player for the New Zealand Warriors
- Niko Kirwan – professional football player
- Nili Latu – rugby player, Tongan international
- Paul MacDonald – Olympic kayaker and surf lifesaver
- Finau Maka – rugby player, Tongan international
- Isitolo Maka – rugby player, All Black
- Morrie McHugh – rugby player, All Black
- Kevin O'Neill – rugby player, All Black
- Sonny Parker – rugby Player, Welsh international
- Xavier Rush – rugby Player, All Black
- Hoskins Sotutu – rugby player, All Black
- Josh Jacomb – rugby player
- Chay Fihaki – rugby player
- JJ Stewart – former All Blacks coach
- Logan Swann – rugby league player
- Carlos Tuimavave – rugby league player
- Taniela Tupou – rugby player, Australian international
- Loni Uhila – rugby player
- Pat Walsh – rugby player, All Black
- Amasio Valence – rugby player, New Zealand 7s

== See also ==
- List of schools in New Zealand

== Bibliography ==
- A.G Butchers, Young New Zealand, Coulls Somerville Wilkie Ltd, Dunedin, 1929.
- Zealandia, 1939–1989.
- Pat Gallager, The Marist Brothers in New Zealand Fiji & Samoa 1876-1976, New Zealand Marist Brothers' Trust Board, Tuakau, 1976.
- E.R. Simmons, In Cruce Salus, A History of the Diocese of Auckland 1848 - 1980, Catholic Publication Centre, Auckland 1982.
- Thomas J. Ryder, Following all Your Ways, Lord - Recollections of Fr Thomas J. Ryder (transcribed and compiled by Margaret Paton) (Privately published, no date – perhaps early 1990s).
- Tony Waters, Confortare, A History of Sacred Heart College, Auckland 1903 - 2003: a Marist Brothers secondary school, Sacred Heart College, Auckland, 2003.
- Nicholas Reid, The Life and Work of Reginald John Delargey Cardinal, Catholic Diocese of Auckland/Pindar, Auckland, 2008.
