= Brett Wilson (rugby union) =

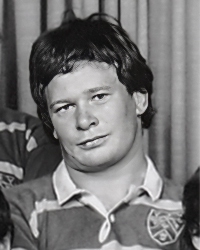
- Wilson in 1978
- Born: Hedley Brett Wilson; 23 August 1957 (age 69) Auckland, New Zealand
- Height: 1.80 m (5 ft 11 in)
- Weight: 94 kg (207 lb)
- School: King's College
- University: Lincoln College

Rugby union career
- Position: Hooker
Provincial / State sides
Years	Team	Apps	(Points)
1981–84	Counties	43	
1986	Hawke's Bay	7	
International career
Years	Team	Apps	(Points)
1983	New Zealand	0	(0)

Hedley Brett Wilson (born 23 August 1957) is a former New Zealand rugby union player. Primarily a hooker but also a useful flanker, Wilson represented Counties and Hawke's Bay at a provincial level, and was a member of the New Zealand national side, the All Blacks, on their 1983 tour of Scotland and England. He played three matches for the All Blacks but did not appear in any internationals.
