= Graham Mexted =

NZ international rugby union player

- Born: Graham George Mexted; 3 February 1927 Greytown, New Zealand
- Died: 9 March 2009 (aged 82) Tawa, New Zealand
- Height: 1.85 m (6 ft 1 in)
- Weight: 93 kg (205 lb)
- School: Wellington College
- Notable relative: Murray Mexted (son)
- Occupation: Motor vehicle business proprietor

Rugby union career
- Position: Number 8
Provincial / State sides
Years	Team	Apps	(Points)
1950–54	Wellington	38	
International career
Years	Team	Apps	(Points)
1950	New Zealand	1	(0)

Graham George Mexted (3 February 1927 – 9 March 2009) was a New Zealand rugby union player. Playing in the position of number 8, Mexted represented Wellington at a provincial level, and was a member of the New Zealand national side, the All Blacks. He represented New Zealand in six international matches, one of them at full test level, from 1950 to 1951. His son Murray Mexted was also an All Black. Graham Mexted died at his home in Tawa, Wellington, on 9 March 2009 aged 82.
