= Manahi Nitama Paewai =

New Zealand doctor, community leader (1920–1990)

Manahi Nitama Paewai OBE OStJ (8 June 1920 – 10 October 1990), also known as Doc Paewai, was a New Zealand doctor, rugby player, local politician and community leader. A Māori from the Ngāti Kahungunu and Rangitāne iwi, he was born near Makirikiri Marae in Hawke's Bay.

A Mormon, his second name Nitama was the Māori translation of Needham, as in Needham Lambert, who was the president of the New Zealand Mission of the Church of Jesus Christ of Latter-day Saints (LDS Church). When he was four years old, Paewai's father Niki Paiwai was admitted to Utah State University, and so Paewai started school at the Woodruff School in Logan, Utah, and was baptized in Logan at age eight. They returned to New Zealand in 1929.

Paewai attended Dannevirke High School before being admitted to the University of Otago. However, at that time there was extreme prejudice against Māori at Otago and he gave up his studies shortly after starting there to return to Tahoraiti, near Dannevirke. Shortly after, the LDS Church mission president at the time, Matthew Cowley, visited that location. On learning that Paewai had quit school, Cowley called him as a missionary, and then gave him his missionary assignment of returning to Otago University and completing his training as a doctor. Paewai graduated from Otago with a degree in medicine in 1945.

In 1957, Paewai did advanced medical studies at the University of Utah. In New Zealand he is recognised as an important practitioner of public health policies by a doctor within the Māori community.

In 1949, Paewai married Hineapa Meha. They became the parents of eight children. Paewai spent most of his adult life in Kaikohe. He was a community leader there and also served on the board of governors of Northland College. He also served on the advisory board of the Church College of New Zealand. Paewai also held many positions in the LDS Church. From 1984 to 1986, Nitami and Hineapa Paewai served as missionaries for the LDS Church in India, Malaysia and Singapore.

In 1966, Paewai was made an Officer of the Order of St John. In the 1967 New Year Honours, he was appointed an Officer of the Order of the British Empire, for services to the Māori people in the Kaikohe district. Paewai's nephew, Albert Kewene, was the first Māori registered dentist.

He was a candidate to stand as the Labour Party nominee at the 1963 Northern Maori by-election after the death of Tapihana Paraire Paikea.

Awards
Preceded by Johnny Smith	Tom French Memorial; Māori rugby union player of the year 1950	Succeeded by Percy Erceg
