= Scott Crichton (rugby union) =

- Born: 18 February 1954 (age 72) Whanganui, New Zealand
- Height: 1.80 m (5 ft 11 in)
- Weight: 110 kg (240 lb)
- School: Wanganui Boys' College, New Zealand

Rugby union career
- Position: Prop
Provincial / State sides
Years	Team	Apps	(Points)
1980–87	Wellington	111	
International career
Years	Team	Apps	(Points)
1982	New Zealand Māori		
1983–85	New Zealand	2	(0)

Scott Crichton (born 18 February 1954) is a former New Zealand rugby union player. A prop, educated at Wanganui Boys' College, Whanganui. After transferring to the Capital he played club rugby for the Karori, Oriental-Rongotai, Athletic and Western Suburbs rugby football clubs in Wellington.

Known as a powerful scrummager, Crichton represented Wellington at the provincial level for 111 games including a successful Ranfurly Shield challenge against Waikato (22-4) in 1981 and subsequent defences in 1982 before Wellington lost the Shield to Canterbury. He also played in the close but ultimately unsuccessful Ranfurly Shield challenge against Canterbury the following year at Lancaster Park scrumming against All Black loosehead prop, John Ashworth. The majority of Crichton's Wellington appearances were with Brian McGrattan as his propping partner on the loosehead.

Crichton was a member of the New Zealand national side, the All Blacks, from 1983 to 1985. He played seven matches for the All Blacks. This included the tour to the United Kingdom where the All Blacks drew with Scotland 25-25 and lost to England 9-15.

Crichton also toured:

- the United Kingdom with Wellington in 1982
- the 1982 New Zealand Māori rugby union tour of Wales and Spain
- the All Blacks 1984 tour of Fiji
- the All Blacks 1985 tour of Argentina
- South Africa with the New Zealand Cavaliers in 1986.

Crichton's All Black appearances were limited by the presence of Gary Knight
