= Brett Michael Wilson =

American singer

- Born: May 10, 1988 (age 38); Hartford, Connecticut
- Origin: West Hartford, Connecticut, United States
- Occupation: Actor/Singer
- Years active: 2001–present

Brett Michael Wilson (born May 10, 1988) is an American actor/musician from West Hartford, Connecticut.

Wilson played the role of Uncle Ernie in a 2011 production of The Who's Tommy.
