= Percy Erceg =

New Zealand rugby union player (1928–2019)

- Born: Charles Percy Erceg; 28 November 1928 Waipapakauri, New Zealand
- Died: 26 May 2019 (aged 90) Kaitaia, New Zealand
- Height: 1.78 m (5 ft 10 in)
- Weight: 79 kg (174 lb)
- School: Sacred Heart College
- Occupation: Insurance agent

Rugby union career
- Position: Wing
Provincial / State sides
Years	Team	Apps	(Points)
1948, 1954–1956	North Auckland	25	
1950–1953	Auckland	30	
International career
Years	Team	Apps	(Points)
1950–1952	New Zealand Māori		
1951–1952	New Zealand	4	(0)

Charles Percy Erceg (28 November 1928 – 26 May 2019) was a New Zealand rugby union player. A wing three-quarter, Erceg represented North Auckland and Auckland at a provincial level, and was a member of the New Zealand national side, the All Blacks, from 1951 to 1952. He played nine matches for the All Blacks including four internationals.

Affiliating to Ngāti Kurī, Erceg represented New Zealand Māori from 1950 to 1952, and in 1951 he was awarded the Tom French Cup as the Māori player of the year. He later served as a national Māori selector from 1972 to 1983, was the manager of the New Zealand Māori side that toured Australia and the Pacific Islands in 1979 and coach of the 1982 team that toured Wales.

Erceg died in Kaitaia on 26 May 2019.

Awards
Preceded by Manahi Paewai	Tom French Memorial; Māori rugby union player of the year 1951	Succeeded by Keith Davis
