= Santiago Santos =

Spanish rugby union coach and former player

- Born: Santiago Santos Muñoz; 11 October 1961 (age 65) Madrid, Spain
- Notable relative: Emilio Butragueño (cousin)

Rugby union career
- Position: Hooker
Amateur team(s)
Years	Team	Apps	(Points)
1979-1984	Real Canoe N.C.		
1984-1992	Liceo Francés		
International career
Years	Team	Apps	(Points)
1980-1992	Spain	18	(4)
Coaching career
- Years: Team
- Liceo Francés
- MARU
- CR Cisneros
- 2013-2023: Spain

Santiago Santos Muñoz (born in Madrid, on 11 October 1961) is a Spanish former rugby union player and coach. He was the coach of the Spain national rugby union team from 2013 to 2023.

== Playing career ==
Santos made his debut for Real Canoe N.C. at the age of 18 years. In 1984, many players left the club and went to Liceo Francés, where he played for the rest of his career, initially in the second division, and finally in the top category. That Liceo team finished runner-up in the 1990–91 and 1992-93 seasons, and runner-up in 1988-89 Copa del Rey. Santos arrived to Alcalá de Henares almost by chance. His life brought him to England to teach at Instituto Español in London for six years. That adventure in London brought him to retire in the amateur teams of the professional London side Wasps RFC.

=== International career ===
As a Spanish international, he debuted at the age of 18, in the test match against Sweden in Uppsala, on 9 June 1980 and his last cap was at the age of 30, during the test match against Romania in Madrid, on 4 April 1992, earning 45 caps for Spain in aggregate.

== Coaching career ==
After his retirement as player, he became a coach. Since then, great clubs from Madrid such as Liceo Francés, MARU (currently Alcobendas Rugby) and Complutense Cisneros were some of the teams he coached until his appointment for the Spanish national side, replacing the New Zealander Bryce Bevin. His highest goal is to bring Spain in a World Cup which the national team did not made to it since 1999. Despite his work as national coach, he is still a highly qualified physical education teacher at the IES Antonio Machado.

== Personal life ==
Although born in Madrid, Santos resides in Alcalá de Henares. He is cousin of the former Real Madrid football player Emilio Butragueño.
