= Paul Koteka =

NZ international rugby union player

- Born: Tohoa Tauroa Koteka; 30 September 1956 (age 70) Tokoroa, New Zealand
- Height: 1.83 m (6 ft 0 in)
- Weight: 108 kg (238 lb)
- School: Tokoroa High School

Rugby union career
- Position: Prop
Provincial / State sides
Years	Team	Apps	(Points)
1978–84	Waikato	93	
1985–89	Western Australia		
International career
Years	Team	Apps	(Points)
1980–84	New Zealand Māori		
1981–82	New Zealand	2	(0)

Tohoa Tauroa "Paul" Koteka (born 30 September 1956) is a former New Zealand rugby union player. A prop, Koteka represented Waikato at a provincial level, and was a member of the New Zealand national side, the All Blacks, in 1981 and 1982. He played six matches for the All Blacks including two internationals. After moving to Perth, he represented Western Australia, and became captain of the team.
