= John Mills (rugby union) =

- Born: John Gordon Mills; 23 February 1960 (age 66) Auckland, New Zealand
- Height: 1.78 m (5 ft 10 in)
- Weight: 88 kg (194 lb)
- School: Auckland Grammar School
- Occupation: School teacher

Rugby union career
- Position: Hooker
Provincial / State sides
Years	Team	Apps	(Points)
1982–83, 1986	Canterbury		
1984	Auckland		
International career
Years	Team	Apps	(Points)
1984	New Zealand	0	(0)
National sevens team
Years	Team		Comps
1984	New Zealand 7s		

John Gordon Mills (born 23 February 1960) is a former New Zealand rugby union player. A hooker, Mills represented Canterbury and Auckland at a provincial level, and was a member of the New Zealand national side, the All Blacks, on their 1984 tour of Fiji. He made two appearances for the All Blacks but did not play any test matches.
