= Bruce Hemara =

New Zealand rugby union player

- Born: Bruce Stephen Hemara; 19 October 1957 (age 69) Palmerston North, New Zealand
- Height: 1.78 m (5 ft 10 in)
- Weight: 88 kg (194 lb)
- School: Palmerston North Boys' High School

Rugby union career
- Position: Hooker
Provincial / State sides
Years	Team	Apps	(Points)
1978–90	Manawatu		
International career
Years	Team	Apps	(Points)
1982–88	New Zealand Māori		
1985	New Zealand	0	(0)

Bruce Stephen Hemara (born 19 October 1957) is a former New Zealand rugby union player. A hooker, Hemara represented Manawatu at a provincial level, and was a member of the New Zealand national side, the All Blacks, for the team's 1985 tour of Argentina. He played three matches for the All Blacks but did not appear in any tests.
