= Bryce Rope =

- Born: Douglas Bryce Rope; 11 February 1923
- Died: 2 March 2013 (aged 90)
- School: Auckland Grammar School
- University: Auckland University College

Rugby union career
- Position: Loose forward
Provincial / State sides
Years	Team	Apps	(Points)
1947–1952	Auckland		
International career
Years	Team	Apps	(Points)
1948–1953	New Zealand Universities		
Coaching career
- Years: Team
- 1965–1973: New Zealand Universities
- 1979–1981: New Zealand Colts
- 1982: New Zealand Juniors
- 1983–1984: New Zealand
- 1983–1987: New Zealand 7s

Douglas Bryce Rope (11 February 1923 – 2 March 2013) was the coach of the New Zealand rugby union team from 1983 to 1984.

== Biography ==
Rope was born in 1923 and attended Auckland Grammar School.

During World War II, Rope trained in Canada and then was a flight instructor with No. 20 OTU. He saw active service, flying fighter bombers in operations over Europe.

Rope played rugby for Auckland and New Zealand Universities in the 1940s and 1950s, as a loose forward. He was All Blacks coach from 1983 to 1984, coaching the team to nine wins in 12 test matches.

Sporting positions
Preceded by Peter Burke	All Blacks coach 1983–1984	Succeeded by Brian Lochore
