= Murray Mexted =

NZ international rugby union player

Murray Mexted ONZM
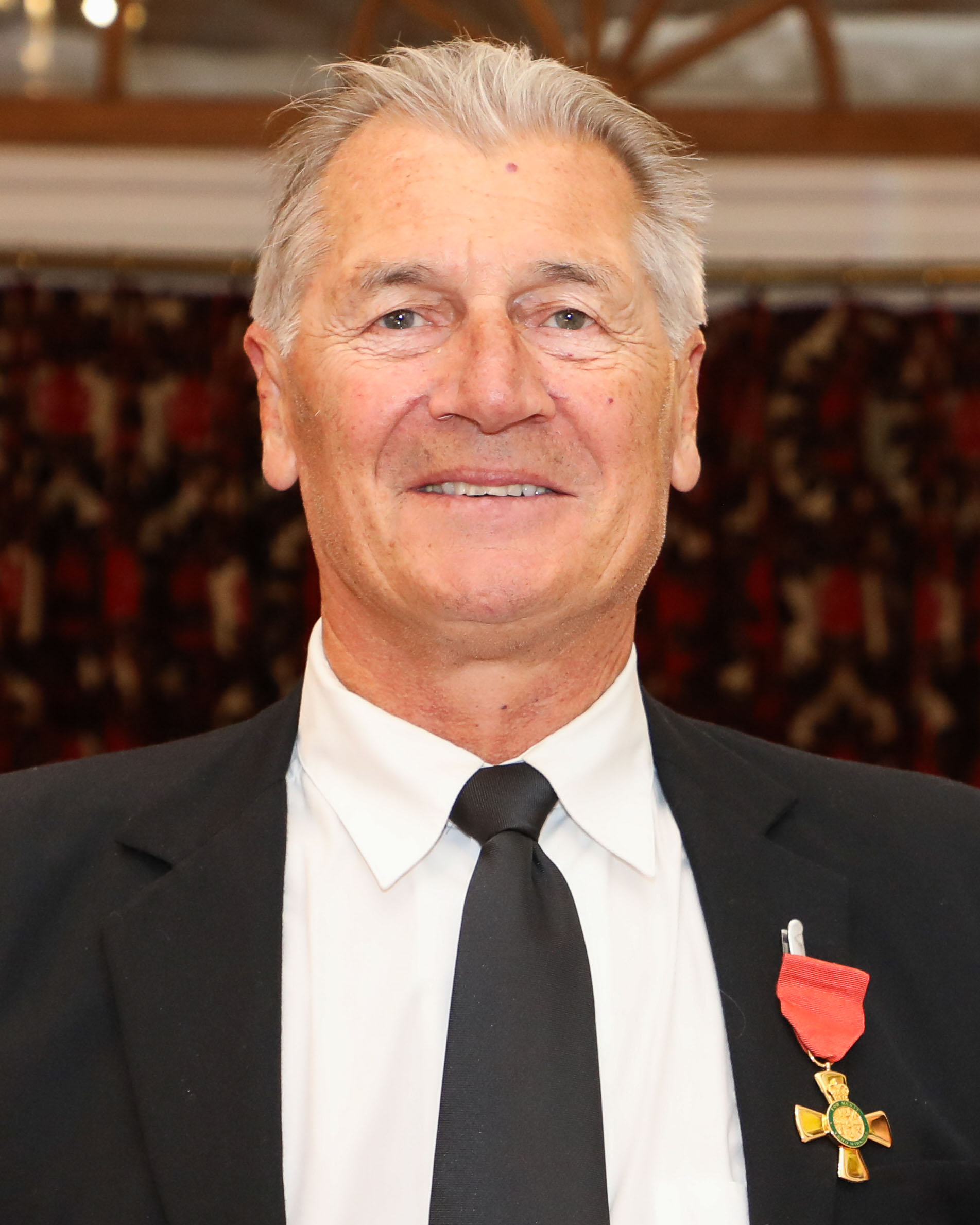
- Mexted in 2025
- Born: Murray Graham Mexted; 5 September 1953 (age 73); Wellington, New Zealand
- Spouse: Lorraine Downes (m. 1986; div. 2001)
- Children: 2
- Relatives: Graham Mexted (father)
- Height: 1.93 m (6 ft 4 in)
- Weight: 95 kg (209 lb)
- School: Tawa College
- University: Victoria University of Wellington

Rugby union career
- Position: Number 8
Provincial / State sides
| Years | Team | Apps | (Points) |
| 1975–1986 | Wellington | | |
| 1982 | Natal | | |
International career
| Years | Team | Apps | (Points) |
| 1979–1985 | New Zealand | 34 | (16) |
| 1986 | New Zealand Cavaliers | | |

Murray Graham Mexted ONZM (born 5 September 1953) is a former New Zealand rugby union player who played 34 consecutive tests for the All Blacks from 1979 to 1985. He also played 38 non-test games including 7 as captain. During his time with the All Blacks, he wore the number eight jersey and was considered an excellent ball winner and an effective defender.

In 1986, his biography, Pieces of Eight, was published, and he married Miss Universe Lorraine Downes. The couple separated in 1999. In recent years, he has retained a high profile as a television colour commentator. Mexted's father, Graham Mexted, was also a New Zealand rugby union international who won one full cap in 1950. Prior to his rugby career, Mexted worked at his family's car dealership.

In the 2025 King's Birthday Honours, Mexted was appointed an Officer of the New Zealand Order of Merit, for services to rugby.
