= Kevin Boroevich =

- Born: Kevin Grant Boroevich; 4 October 1960 (age 66) Te Kūiti, New Zealand
- Height: 1.90 m (6 ft 3 in)
- Weight: 120 kg (260 lb)
- School: Te Kuiti High School
- University: Massey University
- Notable relative(s): Percy Erceg, All Black
- Occupation: General Manager

Rugby union career
- Position: Prop
Provincial / State sides
Years	Team	Apps	(Points)
1978–85	King Country	84	(32)
1986–87	Wellington	33	
1988–95	North Harbour	29	
International career
Years	Team	Apps	(Points)
1978-79	New Zealand Colts		
1980–88	Junior All Blacks	3	(0)
1980–93	Māori All Blacks		
1993	New Zealand XV Captain		
1983-88	All Blacks		
–	New Zealand		

Kevin Grant Boroevich (born 4 October 1960) is a former New Zealand rugby union player. A prop, Boroevich represented King Country, Wellington and North Harbour at a provincial level, and was a member of the New Zealand national side, the All Blacks, between 1983 and 1988. He played 26 matches for the All Blacks including three internationals.
