= Arthur Stone (rugby union) =

- Born: Arthur Massey Stone; 19 December 1960 (age 65) Auckland, New Zealand
- Height: 1.78 m (5 ft 10 in)
- Weight: 82 kg (181 lb)
- School: Trident High School; Rotorua Boys' High School

Rugby union career
- Position: Second five-eighth, centre
Provincial / State sides
Years	Team	Apps	(Points)
1980–85	Waikato	80	
1986	Bay of Plenty		
1987–94	Otago		
International career
Years	Team	Apps	(Points)
1981–86	New Zealand	9	(7)
1982–83	New Zealand Māori		

Arthur Massey Stone (born 19 December 1960) is a former New Zealand rugby union player.

== Rugby career ==
=== Ranfurly Shield winning try ===
Stone, as a nineteen year old, scored the only try in Waikato's Ranfurly Shield challenge against holders Auckland in 1980. In front of a crowd of 47,000, second division Waikato won the shield as a result 7–3. Arthur Stone intercepted an Auckland pass and scored in the left hand corner. Keith Quinn, providing the television commentary said "Has he got the legs? Arthur Stone. He's just having a go…now that is a great try for nineteen year-old Arthur Stone."

=== Provincial and international ===
A second five-eighth and centre, Stone represented Waikato, Bay of Plenty, and Otago at a provincial level, and was a member of the New Zealand national side, the All Blacks, from 1981 to 1985. He played 23 matches for the All Blacks including nine internationals, scoring five tries and one dropped goal. He also played 27 games for the New Zealand Maori team.

Arthur Stone moved south to Dunedin in 1987 and played for Otago for seven years. He played in the 1991 Otago team that won the first division championship playing in 16 games that season for Otago and scoring six tries. He played club rugby for Pirates and Kaikorai.

== Career after rugby ==
Since retiring from rugby, Stone has run a building and building contracting company in Dunedin.
