= Mike Clamp =

New Zealand rugby union player

- Born: Michael Clamp; 26 December 1961 (age 64) Wellington, New Zealand
- Height: 1.85 m (6 ft 1 in)
- Weight: 83 kg (183 lb)
- School: Hutt Valley High School
- Occupation: Teacher

Rugby union career
- Position: Wing
Senior career
Years	Team	Apps	(Points)
1988–93	Biarritz Olympique		
Provincial / State sides
Years	Team	Apps	(Points)
1983–88	Wellington	86	(284)
International career
Years	Team	Apps	(Points)
1982–88	New Zealand Māori		
1984–85	New Zealand	2	(4)
National sevens team
Years	Team		Comps
1984–86	New Zealand 7s		

Michael Clamp (born 26 December 1961) is a former New Zealand rugby union player. A wing, Clamp represented Wellington at a provincial level, and was a member of the New Zealand national side, the All Blacks, in 1984 and 1985. He played 15 matches for the All Blacks including two official internationals.

Clamp was selected as one of the “Five players of the year” for the 1984 season, in the 1985 Rugby Almanack of New Zealand.

Of Ngāti Toa Rangatira affiliation, Clamp played for New Zealand Māori between 1982 and 1988.

Awards
Preceded by Hika Reid	Tom French Memorial; Māori rugby union player of the year 1984	Succeeded by Buck Shelford
