= Andrew Donald =

- Born: Andrew John Donald; 11 May 1957 (age 69) Whanganui, New Zealand
- Height: 1.78 m (5 ft 10 in)
- Weight: 82 kg (181 lb)
- School: Wanganui Collegiate School

Rugby union career
- Position: Halfback
Provincial / State sides
Years	Team	Apps	(Points)
1976–86	Wanganui	118	(80)
International career
Years	Team	Apps	(Points)
1978	New Zealand Colts	3	(0)
1979-80	NZ Juniors	5	(0)
1981–84	New Zealand	7	(0)

Andrew John Donald (born 11 May 1957) is a former New Zealand rugby union player. A halfback, Donald represented Wanganui at a provincial level, and was a member of the New Zealand national side, the All Blacks, from 1981 to 1984. He played 20 matches for the All Blacks including seven internationals.
