= Brian McGrattan (rugby union) =

- Born: 31 December 1959 (age 66) Wellington, New Zealand
- Height: 1.90 m (6 ft 3 in)
- Weight: 105 kg (231 lb)
- School: Rongotai College

Rugby union career
- Position: Prop
Provincial / State sides
Years	Team	Apps	(Points)
1981–86, 88–91	Wellington	105	
1987	Waikato	2	
International career
Years	Team	Apps	(Points)
1983–86	New Zealand	6	(0)

Brian McGrattan (born 31 December 1959) is a former New Zealand rugby union player. A prop, McGrattan represented Wellington and, briefly, Waikato at a provincial level, and was a member of the New Zealand national side, the All Blacks, from 1983 to 1986. He played 23 matches for the All Blacks including six internationals.
