= Steven Pokere =

New Zealand rugby union player (born 1958)

- Born: Steven Tahurata Pokere; 11 August 1958 (age 68) Hāwera, New Zealand
- Height: 1.70 m (5 ft 7 in)
- Weight: 73 kg (161 lb)
- School: Southland Boys' High School

Rugby union career
- Position: Centre
Provincial / State sides
Years	Team	Apps	(Points)
1977–78, 80–83	Southland		
1984–85	Auckland		
1986	Wellington		
International career
Years	Team	Apps	(Points)
1981	New Zealand Māori		
1981–85	New Zealand	18	(8)

Steven Tahurata Pokere (born 11 August 1958) is a former New Zealand rugby union player. A second five-eighth and centre, Pokere represented Southland, Auckland and Wellington at a provincial level, and was a member of the New Zealand national side, the All Blacks, from 1981 to 1985. He played 39 matches for the All Blacks including 18 internationals.

In 2005, Pokere was sentenced to 2½ years in jail for conspiracy to defraud investors of $NZ4million, relating to a company that he ran with three others, all Mormons, that targeted fellow church members, many of whom were friends and family of the quartet.

Awards
Preceded by Frank Shelford	Tom French Memorial; Māori rugby union player of the year 1982	Succeeded by Hika Reid
