= Frank Shelford =

New Zealand rugby union player (born 1955)

- Born: Frank Nuki Ken Shelford; 16 May 1955 (age 71) Ōpōtiki, New Zealand
- Height: 1.80 m (5 ft 11 in)
- Weight: 93 kg (205 lb)
- School: Ōpōtiki College
- Notable relative(s): Buck Shelford (nephew); Darrall Shelford (nephew); Exia Shelford (niece)

Rugby union career
- Position: Flanker
Provincial / State sides
Years	Team	Apps	(Points)
1977–86	Bay of Plenty		
1989	Western Australia		
International career
Years	Team	Apps	(Points)
1979–83	New Zealand Māori		
1981–85	New Zealand	4	(0)

Frank Nuki Ken Shelford (born 16 May 1955) is a former New Zealand rugby union player. A flanker, Shelford represented Bay of Plenty and Hawkes Bay at provincial level, and was a member of the New Zealand national side, the All Blacks, from 1981 to 1985. He played 22 matches for the All Blacks including four internationals.

Of Whakatōhea descent, Shelford played for New Zealand Māori, captaining the side against Tonga in 1983. He won the Tom French Cup for Māori player of the year in 1981.

Shelford was named the supreme winner at the 1984 Bay of Plenty sports awards.

Awards
Preceded by Hika Reid	Tom French Memorial; Māori rugby union player of the year 1981	Succeeded by Steven Pokere
