= Hika Reid =

- Born: Hikatarewa Rockcliffe Reid; 8 April 1958 (age 68) Ngongotahā, New Zealand
- Height: 1.80 m (5 ft 11 in)
- Weight: 95 kg (209 lb)
- School: Western Heights High School

Rugby union career
- Position: Hooker
Provincial / State sides
Years	Team	Apps	(Points)
1978–87	Bay of Plenty	85	
1988–89	Wellington	25	
International career
Years	Team	Apps	(Points)
1979	New Zealand Colts		
1980–88	New Zealand Māori		
1980–86	New Zealand	9	(8)

Hikatarewa Rockcliffe "Hika" Reid (born 8 April 1958) is a former New Zealand rugby union player. A hooker, Reid represented Bay of Plenty and Wellington at a provincial level, and was a member of the New Zealand national side, the All Blacks, between 1980 and 1986. He played 40 matches for the All Blacks including nine internationals. He is remembered today for a spectacular try in the second test against Australia in Brisbane, 1980, in which he started and ended a counterattack from near the All Blacks' goal line.

Awards
Preceded by Vance Stewart	Tom French Memorial; Māori rugby union player of the year 1980; 1983	Succeeded by Frank Shelford
Preceded by Steven Pokere	Tom French Memorial; Māori rugby union player of the year 1980; 1983	Succeeded by Mike Clamp
