= Chris King (rugby union) =

NZ rugby union player (born 1981)

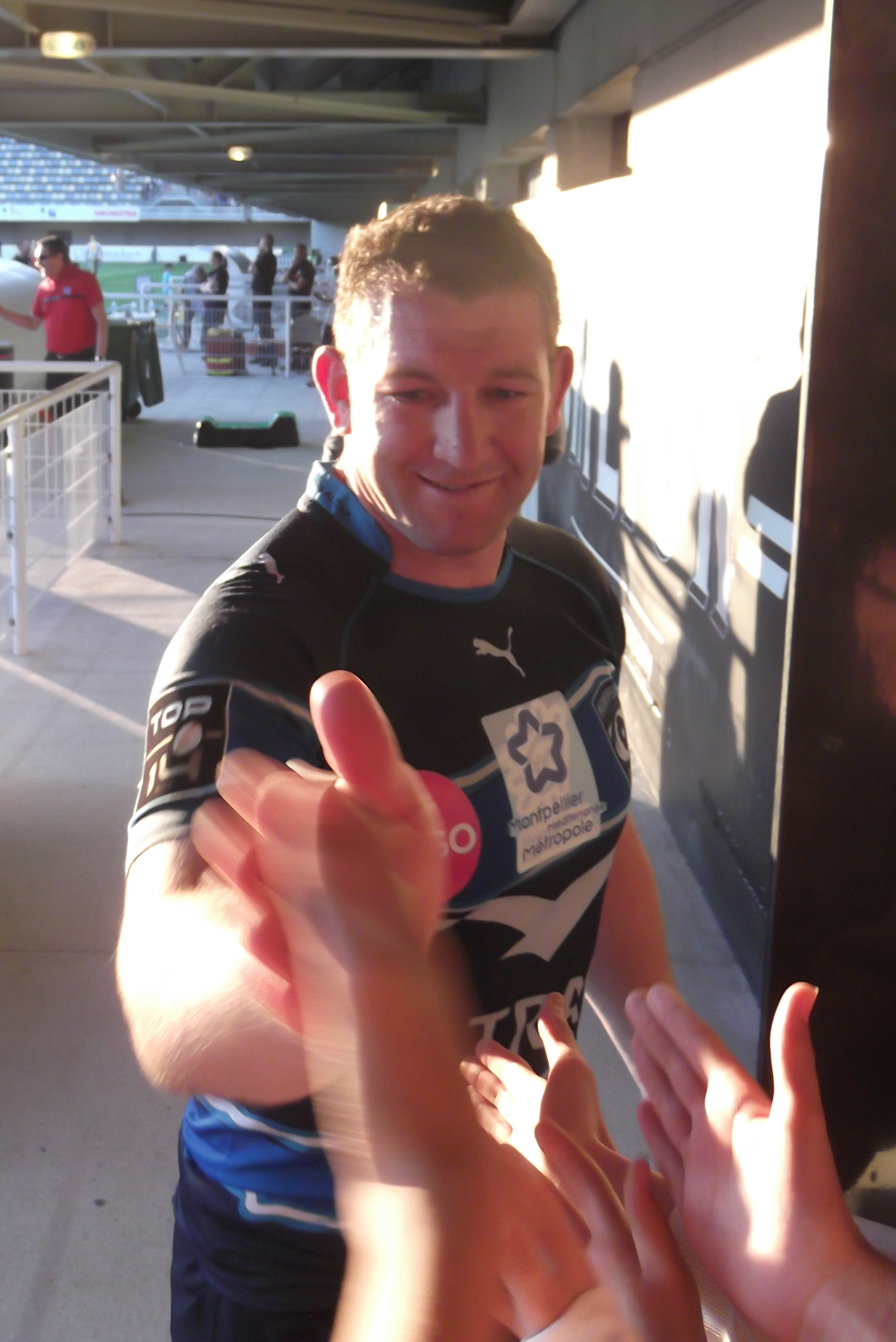
- King in 2015
- Born: Christopher King; 30 April 1981 (age 45) Ashburton, New Zealand
- Height: 1.86 m (6 ft 1 in)
- Weight: 118 kg (18 st 8 lb)

Rugby union career
- Position: Prop
- Current team: Panasonic Wild Knights
Senior career
Years	Team	Apps	(Points)
2014-15	Montpellier	11	(0)
2015-17	Pau	30	(5)
2019-20	Panasonic Wild Knights	7	(0)
- Correct as of 18 December 2019
Provincial / State sides
Years	Team	Apps	(Points)
2002–04	Canterbury	20	(0)
2005–07	Otago	36	(15)
2008–11	Southland	51	(5)
2012–14	Taranaki	11	(0)
2018-19	Canterbury	12	(5)
- Correct as of 18 December 2019
Super Rugby
Years	Team	Apps	(Points)
2003–04	Crusaders	20	(5)
2005–14	Highlanders	107	(25)
2017-18	Crusaders	8	(0)
- Correct as of 18 December 2019

Christopher King (born 30 April 1981) is a New Zealand rugby union player

== Early life ==
King was born in Ashburton. He attended St Andrew's College from 1995 to 1999 during which time he played for the First XV for three years. King captained the team in his final year.

== Career ==
=== Provincial rugby ===
King started his career in 2002 for Canterbury and was a regular in the squad throughout 2003 and 2004. After the 2004 NPC he was loaned to the Highlanders and Otago. After the 2005 Super 12, King transferred permanently to Otago.

With the departure of Clarke Dermody prior to the 2008 Air New Zealand Cup, King was approached by Southland and chose to transfer further south to Invercargill. He along with Mackintosh and Jason Rutledge made up a formidable front row and the team reaching their first ever semi-final of the Air New Zealand Cup. He continued his strong play for Southland in the 2009 Air New Zealand Cup as the squad reached their 2nd consecutive semi-final, and proved a monumental figure in their week 14 Ranfurly Shield win against his former Canterbury team.

In the 2010 ITM Cup, King joined the rest of his teammates in producing a string of stellar performances during the Stags' extended defence of the Ranfurly Shield.

=== Super Rugby ===
King's good form for Canterbury resulted in selection for the Crusaders, appearing in three games during the 2003 Super 12 season as the Crusaders were beaten in the final by the Blues. The following year he played in all 13 matches, mainly off the bench, serving as backup to the All Blacks props Greg Somerville and Dave Hewitt who were the regular starters for the club.

King was loaned to the Highlanders for the 2005 Super 12, but only appeared in 1 match for just 3 minutes. He then transferred permanently to Otago and the Highlanders. He made more of an impression as the Highlanders moved into the Super 14 era in 2006 as he became a regular reserve prop, once again behind two All Blacks in Carl Hayman and Clarke Dermody. In 2007 Super 14, injuries and the fitness programme in the run-up to the 2007 Rugby World Cup (which rested top All Blacks for the first half of the season) saw King receive 7 starts for the Highlanders, his highest total in Super Rugby. After the season both Hayman and Dermody left to play in the United Kingdom leaving Jamie Mackintosh and King as probable starters.

King started the 2008 Super 14 season as the Highlanders' regular tighthead prop, but the emergence of Hawke's Bay giant Clint Newland pushed King once again to the bench as the season went along. The 2009 Super 14 season saw more of the same, although injuries to Mackintosh and Newland saw King receive another 6 starts.

King again started the 2010 Super 14 season as the 3rd choice at prop for the Highlanders behind Mackintosh and Newland, but injury to Mackintosh saw him start the last 6 games of the season, his longest stretch of continuous starts in Super Rugby. During the season, he also joined the select group of players who have made 50 appearances for the franchise.

In the 2011 Super Rugby season, King had the finest year of his career, starting 13 matches for the Highlanders as the first-choice tighthead prop. As of the conclusion of that season, he sits 3rd all-time in appearances at prop for the franchise, behind only Carl Hayman and Carl Hoeft.

=== Top 14 ===
In 2014, Chris King signed a deal to join French Top 14 side Montpellier.

In May 2015 French Top 14 side Pau, announced the signing of King for the 2015–2016 season.
