= Alex Taylor (rugby union) =

New Zealand rugby union player (born 1990)

- Born: Alex Taylor c. 1990 Wānaka, Otago, New Zealand
- Height: 1.89 m (6 ft 2 in)
- Weight: 104 kg (16 st 5 lb)
- School: Southland Boys' High School

Rugby union career
- Position: Number Eight
Amateur team(s)
Years	Team	Apps	(Points)
- Woodlands Rugby Club
2015–	Stirling County		
Senior career
Years	Team	Apps	(Points)
2016	Glasgow Warriors	1	
Provincial / State sides
Years	Team	Apps	(Points)
2011–15	Southland	17	(10)
International career
Years	Team	Apps	(Points)
	New Zealand U18	4	(10)

Alex Taylor (born c. 1990 in Invercargill, Southland, New Zealand) is a New Zealand rugby union player who plays for Stirling County as a Number Eight.

== Rugby Union career ==
=== Amateur career ===
Having started his rugby at Southland Boys' High School, Taylor moved on to senior club play for Woodlands Rugby Club. He was part of 4 Galbraith Shield wins which included a 3 peat. Having moved to Spain for a short-term contract with top club VRAC in Valladolid. Taylor has since moved to Scotland, where now plays for Stirling County.

=== Professional career ===
Taylor played provincial rugby in New Zealand before moving to Scotland. He played for Southland alongside John Hardie. He also played 7s for Southland where he competed in two national tournaments. In 2015, he left New Zealand to go to Scotland.

Taylor played for Glasgow Warriors against Canada 'A' on 30 August 2016.

=== International career ===
He has represented New Zealand at schoolboy and age grade level teams. He was a trialist of the New Zealand Under 20 team ahead of the 2011 World Cup in Argentina. f
