= Michael Mika =

Samoa international rugby union player

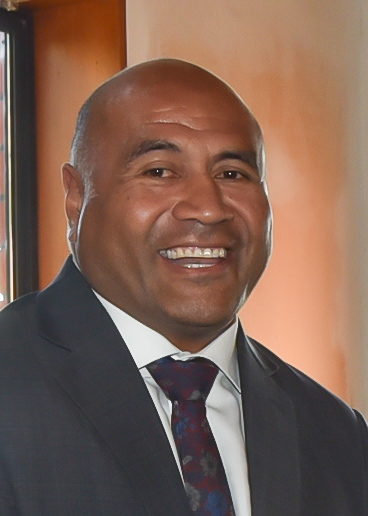
- Mika in 2021

Judge of the District Court
- Incumbent
- Assumed office 8 March 2021

Personal details
- Born: Michael Alaifatu Mika; 24 July 1968 (age 58) Lower Hutt, New Zealand
- Education: University of Otago
- Occupation: Lawyer
- Height: 1.85 m (6 ft 1 in)
- Weight: 114 kg (252 lb)

Rugby union career
- Position: Prop
Amateur team(s)
Years	Team	Apps	(Points)
1992–1994	Otago University		
1994–1995	Star		
1996–1998	Kaikorai		
Senior career
Years	Team	Apps	(Points)
1998–1999	Coventry RFC		
Provincial / State sides
Years	Team	Apps	(Points)
1992–1995	Otago	49	(20)
1997–1998	Southland	14	(0)
Super Rugby
Years	Team	Apps	(Points)
1996–1998	Otago Highlanders	15	(0)
International career
Years	Team	Apps	(Points)
1995–1999	Samoa	15	(0)

Michael Alaifatu Mika (born 24 July 1968) is a New Zealand District Court judge and former Samoan rugby union international. He played as a prop.

== Rugby career ==
Mika was born in Lower Hutt, and first played for Samoa during the quarter-finals against South Africa during the 1995 Rugby World Cup. Although he was part of the 1999 Rugby World Cup roster, playing three matches in the tournament, with his last international cap being during the match against Wales, at the Millennium Stadium, Cardiff.

Mike Mika played for Otago and was a member of the Otago team that defeated the British and Irish Lions in 1993. Mike Mika played for Otago between 1992 and 1997, then for Southland in 1997 and 1998, He also played for the Highlanders between 1996 and 1998. Between 1999 and 2003 Mike Mika played for Coventry RFC. He also represented New Zealand Universities in 1992, 1993 and 1995.

== Post-rugby career ==
Currently, he works as lawyer at Preston Russell Law, based in Invercargill. He is a SANZAAR Judicial Technical Advisor and performs the same role on the World Rugby Judicial Panel. He is also a Judicial Officer of the Oceania Rugby Judicial Panel.

From 2010 to 2021 he served as deputy president of the Invercargill Licensing Trust board, resigning after being appointed as a district court judge by Attorney-General David Parker.

In April 2021, he became first Pasifika judge appointed to a district court outside Auckland, as a resident judge at the Hutt Valley District Court in Lower Hutt.
