= Scott Cowan =

NZ rugby union player

- Born: Scott Cowan; 4 June 1983 (age 43) Gore, Southland, New Zealand
- Height: 1.81 m (5 ft 11 in)
- Weight: 94 kg (207 lb)
- School: Otago Boys' High School
- Notable relative: Jimmy Cowan

Rugby union career
- Position: Halfback
Amateur team(s)
Years	Team	Apps	(Points)
- Midlands Rugby Club
Senior career
Years	Team	Apps	(Points)
2012–13	Viadana	17	(10)
2013–14	Krasny Yar	9	(5)
Provincial / State sides
Years	Team	Apps	(Points)
2008–12	Southland	34	(20)
Super Rugby
Years	Team	Apps	(Points)
2009–10	Highlanders	3	(0)

Scott Cowan (born 4 June 1983 in Gore, New Zealand) is a New Zealand rugby union player who plays as a halfback for the Southland Stags. He is the younger brother of All Blacks halfback, Jimmy Cowan.

== Playing career ==
=== Provincial Rugby ===
With older brother Jimmy on All Blacks duty, Scott emerged as the starting halfback for Southland in the 2009 Air New Zealand Cup, and led the Stags to a monumental Ranfurly Shield victory over Canterbury.

In the 2010 ITM Cup, Cowan was again the starting halfback as Southland defended the Ranfurly Shield for the bulk of the season. However, Jimmy Cowan returned from the All Blacks camp to start the game in which Canterbury re-gained the Shield from Southland.

=== Super Rugby ===
Cowan was included in the Highlanders wider training group for the 2009 Super 14 season to serve as the 3rd-string halfback behind his brother Jimmy and Sean Romans. However, he was called into the full squad for weeks 2 and 3 of the season due to an injury to his brother, and made his Super Rugby debut against the Waratahs on 27 February 2009, coming on as a substitute for Romans.

For the 2010 Super 14 season, Cowan was again included in the Highlanders' wider training group. He was able to earn another 2 substitute appearances for the club, and was included in the 22-man squad for the final 4 games of the season after Romans was ruled out through injury. In the final game of the season against the Queensland Reds, he came on as a substitute for his brother Jimmy.

With the expansion of rosters from 28 to 32 players for the 2011 Super 15 season, Cowan was thought to have a strong chance of earning a full roster spot with the Highlanders, but was passed over in favour of Romans and Aaron Smith, who will serve as the backups to Jimmy Cowan.
