= Star Rugby Club =

NZ rugby union club, based in Southland

(New Zealand) Star RFC
- Full name: Star Rugby Football Club
- Founded: 1886; 140 years ago
- Ground(s): Waverly Park, St Andrew St, Invercargill
- President: Andrew McHugh
- Coach(es): Mark Tinnock and Craig Pullar
- Captain: Charlie Hay
- League: Southland wide Premier Galbraith Shield
Team kit

Star Rugby Club is an amateur rugby club based in Southland, New Zealand. The club's senior team plays in the Southlandwide Premier Division for the Galbraith Shield. The club, which celebrated its 125th anniversary in 2011, has been home to three Southland centurions and a number of All Blacks.

== 125th Anniversary Team ==
The club's 125th anniversary team was selected in 2011 by life members Bob Donnelly, Alan Blackler and Southland Times journalist Logan Savory. The team which included seven All Blacks was as follows:

- 15. Brian McKechnie
- 14. Mana Harrison
- 13. Billy Stead
- 12. John "Darky" Beazley
- 11. Lindsay Booth
- 10. James "Wampy" Bell
- 9. Alan Blackler
- 8. Bob Barber
- 7. John Hardie
- 6. Francis Glasgow
- 5. George Purdue
- 4. Josh Bekhuis
- 3. Brad Leonard
- 2. Corey Flynn
- 1. Phil "Scruffy" Butt
