= Clarke Dermody =

- Born: Clarke Dermody; 22 April 1980 (age 46) Invercargill, New Zealand
- Height: 1.83 m (6 ft 0 in)
- Weight: 115 kg (18 st 2 lb)
- School: Southland Boys' High School

Rugby union career
- Position: Prop
Senior career
Years	Team	Apps	(Points)
2007–2012	London Irish	108	(10)
Provincial / State sides
Years	Team	Apps	(Points)
2000–2007	Southland	89	(10)
Super Rugby
Years	Team	Apps	(Points)
2004–2007	Highlanders	44	(5)
International career
Years	Team	Apps	(Points)
2006	New Zealand	3	(5)

Clarke Dermody (born 22 April 1980, in Invercargill) is a former New Zealand rugby union player who has gone on to coach professionally.

Dermody was born in Invercargill, New Zealand, and attended Southland Boys' High School. Dermody's great-great-grandfather Graham Shannon played for New Zealand in 1893.

== Playing career ==
Dermody played as a prop. He represented Woodlands in the Invercargill premier competition and was the second Woodlands player to have played for the All Blacks after Jimmy Cowan (All Black number 1046). They were later joined by Jamie Mackintosh (All Black 1081).

Dermody played 44 games for the Highlanders in Super Rugby and 89 games for Southland in the National Provincial Championship and Air New Zealand Cup. In June 2006 he had two test appearances against Ireland, playing alongside Keven Mealamu and Carl Hayman, scoring a try in 2nd test. In both matches he was substituted by Neemia Tialata after 67 minutes. He was not required in the 30-man squad for the 2006 Tri Nations Series. In November he played in another test, coming on to replace Tony Woodcock in the final 10 minutes of a 41–20 victory over England at Twickenham.

Dermody missed out on selection for the All Blacks in 2007 but was named in the Junior All Blacks for the Pacific Nations Cup. In November 2007 Dermody played his first of over 100 games in the London Irish jersey. He retired due to a back injury in 2012.

== Coaching career ==
Dermody was Southland's Assistant Coach, to Brad Mooar, in 2014. In 2018 he joined Tasman as co-Head Coach with Andrew Goodman at Tasman when the Mako's won the NPC Premiership titles in 2019 and 2020.

Dermody was interim coach of the Highlanders in Super Rugby in 2021 while Tony Brown was on international duty with Japan. After Brown's tenure, Dermody was announced as the Highlander's Head Coach from 2023. He stayed on as assistant coach when Jamie Joseph was appointed head coach in 2024, and will move to Ulster as forwards coach in 2026.
