= Leo Connolly =

Leo Connolly may refer to:

- Leo Connolly (Australian footballer) (born 2001), former AFL player for St. Kilda
- Leo Connolly (rugby union) (1921–2005), New Zealand international rugby union player
