= Neville Mitchell =

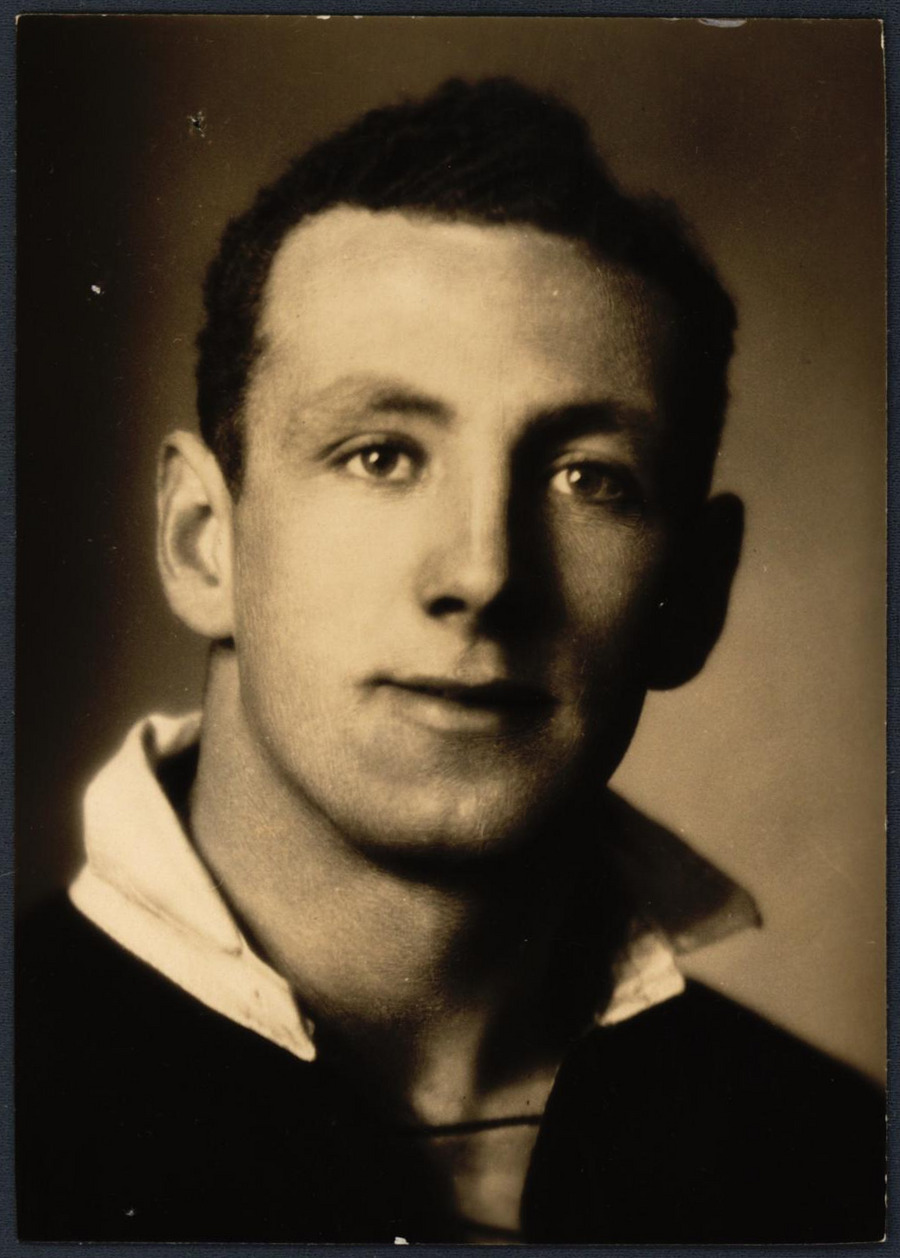
- Born: Neville Alfred Mitchell; 22 November 1913 Invercargill, New Zealand
- Died: 21 May 1981 (aged 67) Auckland, New Zealand
- Height: 1.80 m (5 ft 11 in)
- Weight: 84 kg (185 lb)
- School: Southland Boys' High School
- Occupation(s): Publican, liquor wholesaler

Rugby union career
- Position: Three-quarter
Provincial / State sides
Years	Team	Apps	(Points)
1932–37	Southland	24	
1938–39	Otago	11	
International career
Years	Team	Apps	(Points)
1935–38	New Zealand	8	(12)
Coaching career
- Years: Team
- 1950–51: South Canterbury

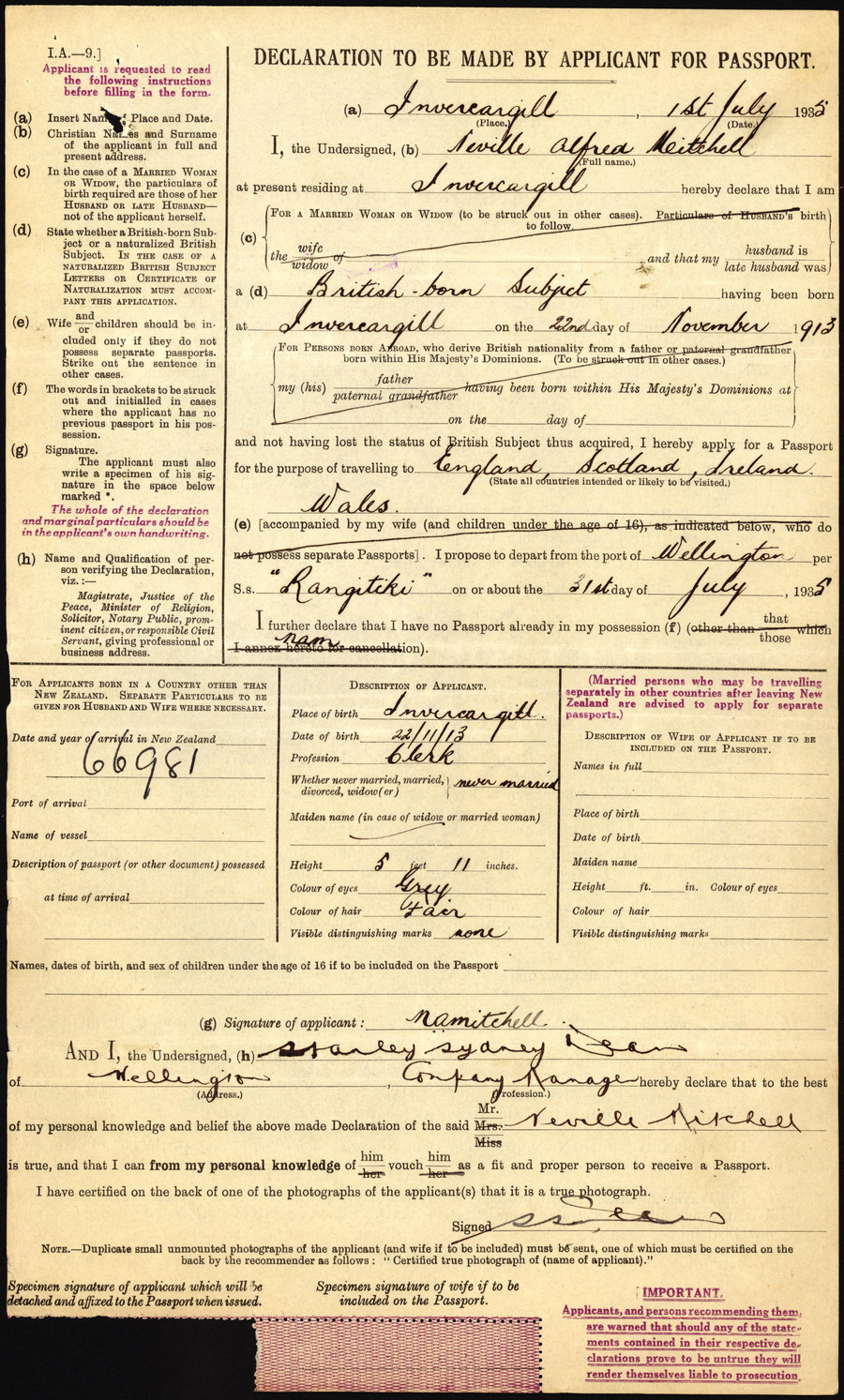
Neville Alfred Mitchell passport application (1935)

Neville Alfred Mitchell (22 November 1913 – 21 May 1981) was a New Zealand rugby union player and coach. A three-quarter, Mitchell represented Southland and Otago at a provincial level, and was a member of the New Zealand national side, the All Blacks, from 1935 to 1938.

Mitchell was selected by the editors of the 1937 Rugby Almanac of New Zealand as one of their 5 players of the year. He played 32 matches for the All Blacks including eight internationals, and captained the side on their 1938 tour of Australia.

He later coached the South Canterbury representative team in 1950 and 1951.
