= Woodlands Rugby Club =

NZ rugby union club, based in Invercargill

Woodlands RFC
- Full name: Woodlands Rugby Football Club
- Ground(s): Woodlands Rugby Club Grounds, 17 Wyeth Rd, Woodlands
- President: Greg Munro
- Coach: Damien Pyne
- Captain: Richard Smith
- League: Invercargill Licensing Trust Southland Wide Premier Division
Team kit

Woodlands Rugby Club is an amateur rugby team that plays in the ILT Southland Wide Premier Division. The team has many Stags stars such as Robbie Robinson, Joe Tuineau and Pehi Te Whare. The team includes Jimmy Cowan and Jamie Mackintosh. Peni Ravai from the Flying Fijians is a new inclusion. Ravai plays Prop/Hooker and was part of the World Cup Fijian Team 2015.
