= Joe Tuineau =

Tonga international rugby union player

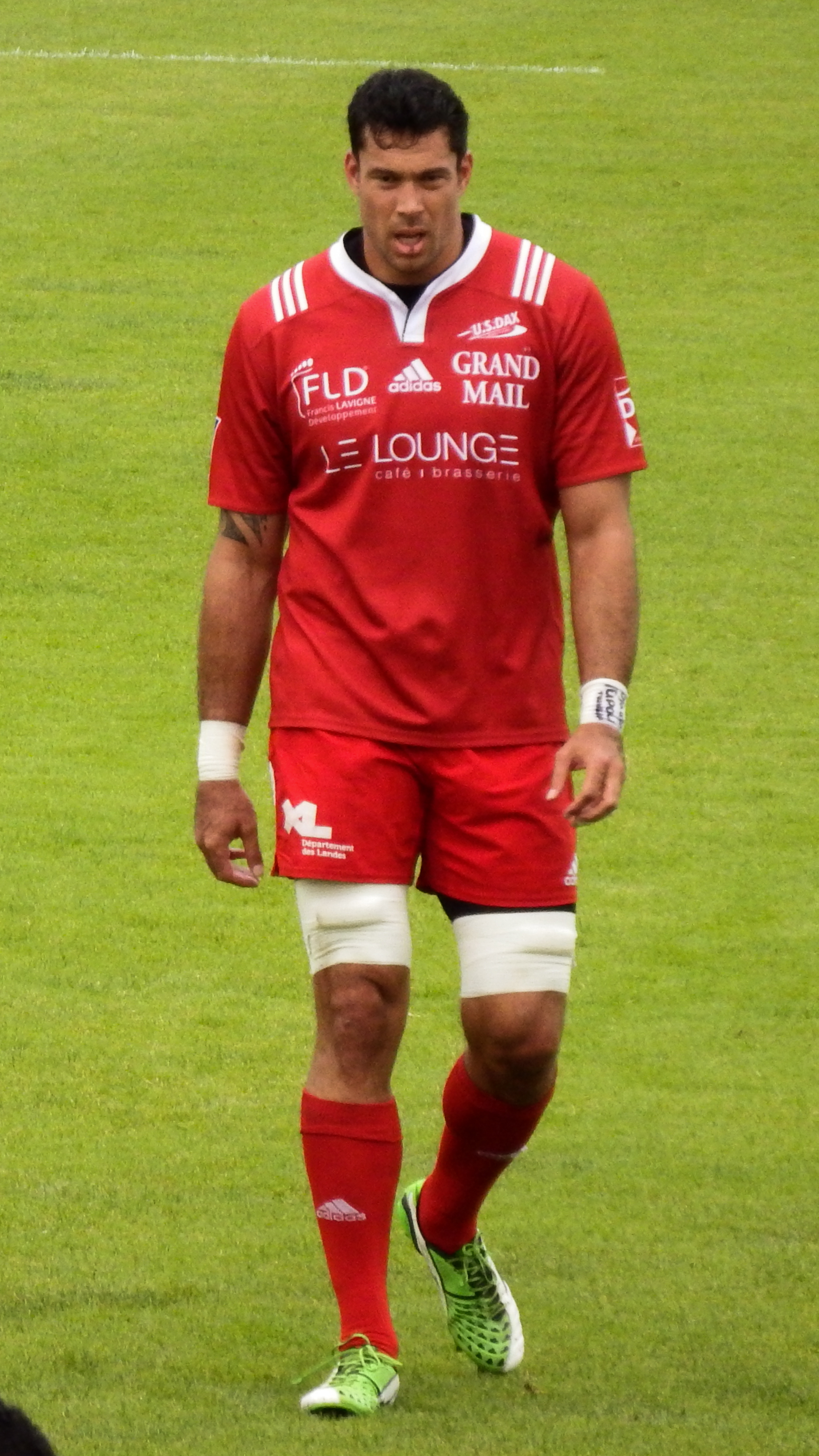
- Full name: Joseph Mark Laifone Tuineau
- Born: 18 August 1981 (age 45) Suva, Fiji
- Height: 2.03 m (6 ft 8 in)
- Weight: 120 kg (18 st 13 lb; 265 lb)
- School: King's College

Rugby union career
- Position: Lock
- Current team: Dax
Senior career
Years	Team	Apps	(Points)
2008–2011	Southland	34	(25)
2010–2011	Highlanders	7	(0)
2011–2012	Montpellier	5	(0)
2012–2013	Provence	27	(20)
2013–2014	Lyon	29	(25)
2015–	Dax	66	(25)
- Correct as of 22 May 2018
International career
Years	Team	Apps	(Points)
2011–	Tonga	30	(5)
- Correct as of 16 June 2018

Joseph Mark Laifone Tuineau (born 18 August 1981) is a Tonga international rugby union footballer. He plays in the lock position for the France based Pro D2 side, Dax. Tuineau also represents Tonga at international level.

Tuineau is a former American football player born in Fiji and raised in New Zealand. His partner is Southern Steel and Silver Ferns goal shoot Daneka Wipiiti.

== Rugby career ==
=== Provincial Rugby ===
Tuineau was a rugby and track star at King's College in Auckland but dropped the sport for several years to pursue a career in American football. He returned to New Zealand in mid-2008, and two days after arriving he represented Woodlands in the Galbraith Shield final. He trained heavily to lose excess weight and gain fitness, and played most of the 2008 season with the Southland Development team before getting into late season games off the bench in the Air New Zealand Cup for Southland.

In 2009 he became a regular starter with the Stags in the Air New Zealand Cup, appearing in all but one of the team's 14 games. He was a key figure in Southland's Ranfurly Shield win against Canterbury, ending the fifty-year drought for the province. He finished the 2009 Air New Zealand Cup with a team high four tries and was selected for the 2010 Highlanders squad.

He continued as a starter for Southland during their extended defence of the Ranfurly Shield in the 2010 ITM Cup. He appeared in the first 5 matches of the 2011 ITM Cup, helping the province to another Ranfurly Shield triumph, before leaving to join the Tongan national side in preparation for the 2011 Rugby World Cup.

=== Super Rugby ===
Tuineau's strong showings with Southland earned him a contract with the Highlanders for the 2010 Super 14 season. He didn't make his debut until the team's 6th match of the season, but an injury to starting lock Tom Donnelly saw an increase in playing time, and he appeared as a substitute in 7 of the final 8 games of the year.

Although he was again included in the Highlanders squad for the 2011 Super Rugby season, he found himself on the fringes of the squad and didn't feature in any matches over the course of the season.

=== International Play ===
In the leadup to the 2011 Rugby World Cup, Tuineau declared his intention to represent Tonga, and made his debut against Fiji on 2 July 2011.

== Football career ==
Tuineau first played football in New Zealand for South Auckland Raiders and then attended Southeast Missouri State University where he played tight end. When Tuineau played football he weighed 131 kg (20 st 9 lb; 289 lb). He played four seasons for the Redhawks recording 61 catches for 772 yards, averaging 12.7 yards per catch with one touchdown. After going undrafted in the 2008 National Football League draft Tuineau trained with the Jacksonville Jaguars, New York Jets and the New York Giants but failed to receive a National Football League contract. After weighing up his options in 2008 he returned to New Zealand to pursue a rugby union career and signed a two-year deal Southland.

Year	Team	G	GS	Rec	Yds	Avg	Lng	TD
2004	Southeast Missouri State University	8	0	9	70	7.8	18	0
2005	Southeast Missouri State University	11	10	25	305	12.2	24	0
2006	Southeast Missouri State University	10	4	6	63	10.5	19	0
2007	Southeast Missouri State University	11	11	21	334	15.9	35	1
CAREER		40	25	61	772	12.7	35	1
