= Isoa Domolailai =

Fijian rugby union footballer

- Born: Isoa Ulago Domolailai; 13 January 1981 (age 45) Sigatoka, Fiji
- Height: 2.03 m (6 ft 8 in)
- Weight: 120 kg (18 st 13 lb; 265 lb)

Rugby union career
- Position(s): Lock, Flanker
Senior career
Years	Team	Apps	(Points)
1999 - 2000	Nadroga		
2001 - 2001	Lautoka		
2001 - 2001	Fiji Warriors		
2001 - 2001	Fiji Barbarians		
2002 - 2004	Marist		
2004 - 2004	Poverty Bay	9	(0)
2005 - 2005	Northland	11	(0)
2005 - 2005	Nadroga		
2006 - 2006	Stallions	3	(0)
2006 - 2006	Fiji Warriors	3	(0)
2006 - 2006	Calvisano		
2006 - 2006	Toulon	15	(5)
2006 - 2007	Tarbes	65	(10)
International career
Years	Team	Apps	(Points)
2001 - 2007	Fiji	13	(0)
National sevens team
Years	Team		Comps
2001	Fiji		Japan

Isoa Ulago Domolailai (born Sigatoka, 13 January 1981) is a Fijian rugby union footballer. He plays as a lock.

== Career ==
He currently plays for Tarbes in France. Domolailai's first game for Fiji was on 10 November 2001, in a 10–66 loss to Italy. He missed the 2003 Rugby World Cup finals, due to an injury, but was selected again for the 2007 Rugby World Cup finals. He played, as a substitute, in the 12–55 loss to Australia, on 23 September 2007. He wasn't selected since then. Domolailai currently holds 13 caps for the Fijian Squad, having yet to score his first points.
