= Billy Stead =

New Zealand rugby union player & coach (1877–1958)

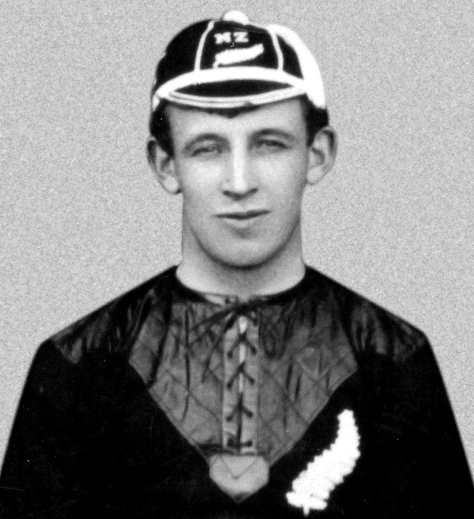
- Stead in 1903
- Born: John William Stead; 18 September 1877 Invercargill, Southland, New Zealand
- Died: 21 July 1958 (aged 80) Bluff, Southland, New Zealand
- Height: 1.73 m (5 ft 8 in)
- Weight: 64 kg (141 lb)
- School: Southland Boys' High School
- Notable relative: John Stead (father)
- Occupation: Bootmaker

Rugby union career
- Position: First five-eighths
Amateur team(s)
Years	Team	Apps	(Points)
1896–1908	Star Rugby Club		
Provincial / State sides
Years	Team	Apps	(Points)
1896–1908	Southland	52	
International career
Years	Team	Apps	(Points)
1903–08	New Zealand	42	(36)
1910	Māori All Blacks	13	
Coaching career
- Years: Team
- 1921: New Zealand
- 1921: Māori All Blacks

Billy Stead, born John William Stead, (18 September 1877 – 21 July 1958) was a rugby union player born in Invercargill who played for New Zealand, the All Blacks, on their 1905–06 tour. Stead also played provincially for Southland, and later coached various teams, including Southland and the New Zealand Māori. A bootmaker by trade, he also co-authored The Complete Rugby Footballer with Dave Gallaher, and was a columnist for the Southland Times, and New Zealand Truth.

== Early rugby career ==
Billy Stead was born in Invercargill on 18 September 1877, and one of his earliest exposures to rugby was watching Joe Warbrick with his New Zealand Native football team play against Southland. Neither Stead's primary nor secondary school (Southland Boys' High School) did much to encourage students to play rugby, but he did manage to get a place in the school team after debuting as a late injury replacement. He left school aged 16 to enter his trade as a bootmaker, and along with some friends tried to join the local Pirates' Rugby Club, but the club could not accommodate the interest of all those that wanted to join, and so Stead was told to instead join Star Rugby Club. After joining the club he played for their second and third teams for a couple of years before earning promotion to their senior side in 1896. He played at First five-eighths for the side, and in his first season earned selected for his province.

== Provincial and international selection ==
Stead first played representative rugby for Southland in 1896. He was only 18 at the time, and continued to play for the province until 1908; eventually racking up 52 matches for the side. After representing the South Island in 1903, he was selected for the All Blacks that year. (Note: The All Blacks were not known as such until 1905.) Although he did tour with the team to Australia, he did not play in a Test match until the following year. In his first Test against Great Britain in 1904, Stead captained the side. He was again selected for the All Blacks the following year for their northern hemisphere tour. Although he did not participate in the preliminary tour of Australia due to work commitments, Stead did play against Canterbury and then Wellington for the All Blacks.

Dave Gallaher was named as the tour captain, with Stead as vice-captain. On the voyage to Britain, both players resigned as captain and vice-captain respectively. They had both been appointed by the New Zealand Rugby Football Union (NZRFU), but believed that the players should have a say in the choice of captain. Although the teams' manager refused to accept the resignations, the team still took a vote; going 17 to 12 in favour of endorsing the NZRFU's selections The tour was highly successful for Stead as he established himself as one of New Zealand's greatest ever first-five-eighths.

Stead participated in 29 of the Originals' matches, and although he only scored 11 tries for the team, his ability to set up tries for other players was vital. Jimmy Hunter, who scored 44 tries on tour, said to him at the Originals' 50-year reunion, "Without you I was nothing". Stead was considered a master tactician, and him missing the teams' Wales Test was considered a major factor in their only loss.

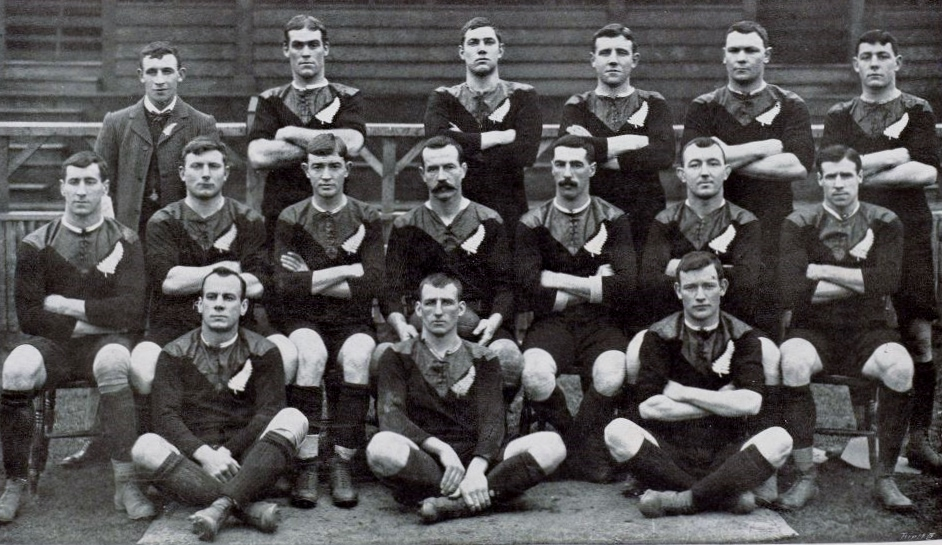
Billy Stead did not play for New Zealand in their fixture against Wales on their 1905–06 tour, and his absence was considered a major factor in New Zealand's loss. Standing on the far left of the back row, he is pictured here posing with the team before the match.

Before the New Zealand squad left Britain, English publisher Henry Leach asked Stead and Gallaher to author a book on rugby tactics and play. They finished the task in under a fortnight and were each paid £50. Entitled The Complete Rugby Footballer, the book was 322 pages long and included chapters on tactics and play, as well as a summary of rugby's history in New Zealand including the 1905 tour. It was mainly authored by Stead, a bootmaker, with Gallaher contributing most of the diagrams. Gallaher almost certainly made some contributions to the text, including sections on Auckland club rugby, and on forward play. The book showed the All Blacks' tactics and planning to be superior to others of the time, and according to Matt Elliott is "marvellously astute"; it received universal acclaim on its publication. According to a 2011 assessment by ESPN's Graham Jenkins, it "remains one of the most influential books produced in the realms of rugby literature".

After the Originals' tour, Stead's next All Blacks' match was not until 1908 when he captained them twice against the Anglo-Welsh.

Following the 1908 season, Stead went into semi-retirement, but was persuaded to play for the New Zealand Māori. The Māori team was formed after a proposal by Ned Parata to the NZRFU, and a tour to New South Wales was organised for 1910. Stead was named vice-captain for the tour, and played in the first ever Māori match, against the Rotorua sub union on 21 May 1910. The side then played a match against Auckland, which they lost, before departing for Australia. He played in 13 of the sides matches on tour, including their 13–8 win against Queensland, which was the first Māori victory over significant opposition. The tour generated a modest profit which was donated to a girls' school, and provided the foundation for the continued existence of the side.

== In retirement ==
After his retirement, Stead continued to be involved in rugby as an administrator and coach. In 1921 he coached the All Blacks in two of their Tests against South Africa. Stead also coached the New Zealand Māori, as well as writing for the Southland Times and New Zealand Truth.

== Bibliography ==
- Elliott, Matt (2012). Dave Gallaher—The Original All Black Captain (paperback). London: Harper Collins. ISBN 978-1-86950-968-2.
- McLean, Terry (1987). New Zealand Rugby Legends. Auckland, New Zealand: MOA Publications. ISBN 0-908570-15-5.
- Mulholland, Malcolm (2009). Beneath the Māori Moon—An Illustrated History of Māori Rugby. Huia Publishers. ISBN 978-1-86969-305-3.
- Ryan, Greg (2005). The Contest for Rugby Supremacy—Accounting for the 1905 All Blacks. Canterbury University Press. ISBN 1-877257-36-2.
- Tobin, Christopher (2005). The Original All Blacks 1905–06. Auckland, New Zealand: Hodder Moa Beckett. ISBN 1-86958-995-5.
- "Dave Gallaher". allblacks.com.
- Jenkins, Graham (25 September 2011). "Rucking all over the world". ESPN.
