= Rugby Southland =

Rugby Union body in New Zealand

- Sport: Rugby union
- Jurisdiction: Southland region
- Founded: 1887; 139 years ago
- Affiliation: New Zealand Rugby
- Headquarters: Invercargill
- Chairman: Bernie McKone
- Director: John Prendergast

Official website
- www.rugbysouthland.co.nz
- (New Zealand)

Rugby Southland (formerly the Southland Rugby Football Union) is the provincial rugby union who govern the Southland region of New Zealand. Their headquarters are at Rugby Park Stadium in Invercargill, which is also the home ground of the union's professional team, the Southland Stags who compete in the Mitre 10 Cup Championship Division and challenge for the Ranfurly Shield.

Despite their history, no Southland team has ever won the top division of the New Zealand National Provincial Championship since organised competition began in 1976. However, they have won the NPC second division title five times and held the Ranfurly Shield eight times, most recently in 2025 when they beat Waikato 25-10. Southland also plays for the Donald Stuart Memorial Shield against rivals Otago in what is the longest tenured provincial rivalry in New Zealand first-class rugby with close to 250 matches.

== History ==
=== Formation and early years ===
Founded in 1887 after splitting from Otago, Southland and its former stablemate went on to forge what is New Zealand's longest inter-provincial rugby rivalries. The two sides have played more games against each other than any other representative teams in New Zealand. They played their first game against Otago, losing in a close affair. The Southland region already had strong club rugby teams with Invercargill competing in the Dunedin based competition. The Invercargill club had already produced two All Blacks. They were outside back, Henry Braddon and wing forward, James O'Donnell. In 1885 these two players were recognised as Otago All Blacks as they played their rugby for neighbouring province.

It was not until 1896 when Southland hooker, Nisbet McRobie was selected in the New Zealand team to play Queensland. The side won 9-nil and it was McRobie's only game in the 'black jersey', however he occupies a special place in Southland Rugby history as the provinces first of over 50 All Blacks. Billy Stead became the provinces first test All Black in 1903 and also captained the All Blacks 12 times.

=== Production of talent ===
Southland is renowned for producing a high number of quality players despite the small population of the province shown by the over 50 All Blacks who have come from Southland. This continued following the war with players such as Leo Connolly and Jack Hazlett followed by Leicester Rutledge and Frank Oliver. But as rugby in New Zealand was organised into structured annual competition to replace tours and series which Southland had played in previously Southland Rugby struggled to retain their local talent. With Southland in the NPC Second Division from 1976, talented Southlanders began heading north in search of top level rugby. Southland continued to produce homegrown talent over 1980s and 1990s which led them to five Second Division titles, namely Brian McKechnie, Steven Pokere, Geoff Valli, Paul Henderson and Simon Culhane who was the shining light for Southland over this period, it was the talent that was lost that continues to haunt Southland fans. Southland at this time was used as a kickstart for many successful players careers. Valli moved to North Auckland in 1981, Pokere left Southland for Auckland in 1984 and Henderson spent what most consider to be his best years as a footballer in Otago from 1987 to 1991. This worsened as Southland neared the millennium and led to embarrassing results where victories were few and far between as Southland was promoted to the NPC First Division after their 1996 championship.

Considered one of Southland's best ever athletes, it pains many Southland fans to think that Jeff Wilson played only a season for Southland whilst still attending Cargill High School before heading to Otago to attend university and play his provincial rugby and cricket both of which he would represent New Zealand in before turning 20, going on to play 60 tests for the All Blacks. Justin Marshall who was Southland's halfback left after the winning the 1994 Second Division title and went on to become one of New Zealand's greatest halfbacks playing 81 All Black tests from 1995 to 2005 and winning every major trophy in New Zealand rugby excluding a Rugby World Cup. 2002 Southland captain Corey Flynn left the province for Canterbury in 2003 and went on to play 70 games for Canterbury and 15 for the All Blacks.

Others who kickstarted their career in Southland before moving where they became All Blacks Norm Hewitt, Pita Alatini, David Hill and Paul Miller. All Blacks such as Anton Oliver, Damian McKenzie and Mils Muliaina (with the latter going on to become the second ever All Blacks centurion), who left the province for their schooling would not return with rugby's increasing professionalism to represent the province like their family had in the past.

In recent years such as 2021, Ethan De Groot has played three tests for the All Blacks

=== Southland vs international teams ===
For a province of its size, Southland has an unmatched record against international teams. Rugby Park has rarely been a successful venue for visiting foreign sides, many of which have fallen to determined Southland teams over the years.

Australian national and state sides have had a particularly miserable time in Invercargill, losing on twelve occasions. Southland defeated Queensland in 1896 and New South Wales in 1901, 1923 and 1928. The touring Wallabies were beaten by Southland in 1913, 1931, 1936, 1946, 1952, 1958, 1962 and 1978.

The British Lions were defeated 11-0 in 1950 and 16-8 in 1966. France were beaten by Southland 12-11 in 1979 and 12-7 in 1989.

Fiji in 1957, All Japan 1974, Canada 1988 and Italy in 2003 were also beaten by Southland.

=== Ranfurly Shield ===
Southland were the first South Island province to win the coveted Ranfurly Shield in 1920 when they beat Wellington. Their first shield reign was brief, losing the Shield back to Wellington in 1921 after two defences. They next won the Shield in 1929 off Wairarapa, this time defending it four times before again losing to Wellington.

Southland then won the Ranfurly Shield in 1937 and 1938 when they retained the Shield for 12 challenges before losing it to bitter rivals Otago in 1947. With Ranfurly Shield rugby not played from 1939 to 1945 due to World War II, Southland's nine years with the Shield remains the longest in terms of time period although it did reside under a bed for much of this time. The Southland side during this period boasted All Blacks George Purdue, Bill Hazlett, Art Wesney, Les George and All Black Captains Frank Kilby and Brushy Mitchell in the Shield winning sides.

Their next Shield victory over Taranaki in 1959 would be their last for 51 years before the 2009 Southland side broke the drought by beating Canterbury 9-3 in Christchurch. Their six defences of the Shield proved to be some of the more iconic Shield games in the professional era including a 16-12 victory over arch-rivals Otago in front of a sold-out Rugby Park, and a 9-6 victory over Auckland days after the biggest snow storm ever recorded in the province led to fans having to shovel snow off the field the day before the game. After losing the Shield to Canterbury, the Stags again claimed the shield from their South Island rivals in 2011 in their most recent tenure which lasted two games. These Southland sides were not headlined by regular All Blacks like the teams from the 1930s and 1940s, instead they were made up mostly of locally grown talent educated at Southland Boys' High School such as captain Jamie Mackintosh, centurions Jason Rutledge, David Hall, Josh Bekhuis and Tim Boys, and future Scotland international John Hardie.

=== Name change ===
In 1998 the Southland Rugby Football Union Incorporated changed its name to Rugby Southland Incorporated

== Club rugby ==
When Robert Galbraith stepped down as the Southland Rugby Football Union secretary the union handed him a donation which the long-serving Southland rugby administrator promptly spent on a shield he donated back to the union as a prize for Invercargill's top club rugby competition. The Galbraith Shield has been the prize for Southland's premier club rugby competition since 1908.

There are six teams currently in Southland's premier competition; Marist, Blues, Pirates-Old Boys, Star, Woodlands and the Eastern-Northern Barbarians whose players come from the clubs in the Eastern/Northern sub union.

Current Senior Clubs:

- Albion
- Balfour/Lumsden
- Bluff
- Central Pirates
- Collegiate
- Drummond-Limehills Star
- Eastern-Northern Barbarians
- Edendale
- Invercargill (Blues)
- Marist
- Mataura
- Midlands
- Mossburn
- Ohai-Nightcaps
- Otautau
- Pioneer
- Pirates-Old Boys
- Pukerau
- Riversdale
- Riverton
- Star
- Te Anau
- Tokanui
- Waiau Star
- Waikaia
- Waikaka White Star
- Waikiwi
- Wakatipu Wanderers ^{1}
- Woodlands
- Wrights Bush
- Wyndham

^{1} Wakatipu play in the Otago Country competition, however due to lack of suitable competition their B team play in the Southlandwide competition as the Wakatipu Wanderers. Wakatipu High School also compete in Southland competition as it involves less travel than the corresponding Otago competition.

=== Galbraith Shield Champions ===
Galbraith Shield Champions
Year	Club	Year	Club	Year	Club	Year	Club	Year	Club
1980	Star	1990	Invercargill (Blues)	2000	Woodlands	2010	Woodlands	2020	Woodlands
1981	Invercargill (Blues)	1991	Invercargill (Blues)	2001	Marist	2011	Star	2021	Woodlands
1982	Invercargill (Blues)	1992	Invercargill (Blues)	2002	Star	2012	Woodlands	2022	Woodlands
1983	Invercargill (Blues)	1993	Invercargill (Blues)	2003	Invercargill (Blues)	2013	Woodlands	2023	Pirates-Old Boys
1984	Pirates	1994	Invercargill (Blues)	2004	Woodlands	2014	Woodlands	2024	Star
1985	Star	1995	Albion	2005	Invercargill (Blues)	2015	Star	2025	Woodlands
1986	Star	1996	Woodlands	2006	Eastern Hawks (Pirates-Old Boys RFC)	2016	Eastern-Northern Barbarians	2026	Eastern-Northern Barbarians
1987	Invercargill (Blues)	1997	Wyndham	2007	Star	2017	Marist		
1988	Invercargill (Blues)	1998	Waikaka	2008	Woodlands	2018	Marist		
1989	Invercargill (Blues)	1999	Star	2009	Star	2019	Invercargill (Blues)		

==== Recent club finals ====
- 2026 - Eastern-Northern Barbarians 40-28 Pirates-Old Boys
- 2025 - Woodlands 40-30 Pirates-Old Boys
- 2024 - Star 22-18 Pirates Old Boys
- 2023 - Pirates-Old Boys 37-10 Eastern-Northern Barbarians
- 2022 - Woodlands 28-27 Pirates-Old Boys
- 2021 - Woodlands 24-23 Star
- 2020 - Woodlands 83-31 Star

==== Total titles by club ====
Total titles	Club	Seasons
31	Invercargill (Blues)	1911, 1912, 1930, 1931, 1936, 1937, 1939, 1945, 1946, 1947, 1958, 1964, 1967, 1970, 1971, 1974, 1977, 1981, 1982, 1983, 1987, 1988, 1989, 1990, 1991, 1992, 1993, 1994, 2003, 2005, 2019
30	Star	1908, 1913, 1914, 1917, 1919, 1920, 1921, 1922, 1923, 1924, 1925, 1926, 1928, 1951, 1966, 1967, 1969, 1972, 1973, 1975, 1980, 1985, 1986, 1999, 2002, 2007, 2009, 2011, 2015, 2024
12	Pirates	1927, 1929, 1932, 1933, 1935, 1938, 1949, 1960, 1962, 1963, 1976, 1984
12	Woodlands	1996, 2000, 2004, 2008, 2010, 2012, 2013, 2014, 2020, 2021, 2022, 2025
7	Marist	1940, 1948, 1957, 1979, 2001, 2017, 2018
6	Bluff	1950, 1952, 1954, 1955, 1956, 1959
1	Waikaka	1998
1	Albion	1995
2	Pirates-Old Boys	2006, 2023
2	Eastern-Northern Barbarians	2016, 2026
1	Wyndham	1997
4	Old Boys	1934, 1945, 1961, 1968
2	Collegiate	1953, 1965
1	Winton	1909
1	Waikiwi	1910
1	Athletic	1918
1	Tokanui	1978

=== Premier women ===
Club final winner:

- 2026 Pioneer 43-22 Marist
- 2025 Star 46-10 Albion

== High Schools Rugby ==
- Aurora College
- Central Southland College
- Gore High School
- James Hargest College
- Menzies College
- Northern Southland College
- Southland Boys' High School
- Southland Girls' High School
- St Peter's College, Gore
- Te Wharekura o Arowhenua
- Verdon College
- Wakatipu High School

== Southland in Super Rugby ==
Southland are one of three home unions to make up the Highlanders Super Rugby team, the other two unions being Otago and North Otago. Southland players are free to play for whichever Super team contracts them, with those who aren't contracted often representing the Highlanders development team known as the Bravehearts. The players from the 2025 Southland Stags squad participating in the 2026 Super Rugby Pacific season are:

- Alefosio Aho
  - Moana Pasifika: 2026
- Ethan de Groot
  - Highlanders: 2020–present (63 caps)
- Mitchell Dunshea
  - Highlanders: 2024-present (17 caps)
- Paula Latu
  - Moana Pasifika: 2026
- Faletoi Peni
  - Moana Pasifika: 2026
- Sevu Reece
  - Crusaders: 2019-present (89 caps)
- Jack Sexton
  - Crusaders: 2026
- Jack Taylor
  - Highlanders: 2023-present (23 caps)
- Semisi Tupou Ta'eiloa
  - Moana Pasifika: 2025-present
- Sean Withy
  - Highlanders: 2022-present (41 caps)

== Honours ==
- NPC South Island Second Division
  - Champions: 1982, 1984
- NPC Second Division
  - Champions: 1989, 1994, 1996
- Air New Zealand Cup
  - Semifinalists: 2008, 2009
- Ranfurly Shield
  - 1920, 1929, 1937, 1938, 1959, 2009, 2011, 2025

=== Captains ===
Southland's Captains since 1976 are:

- Dave Saunders 1976, 1978–79
- Frank Oliver 1977
- Brian McKechnie 1979, 1982–83
- Ken Stewart 1980-81
- Paul Macfie 1984-85
- Trevor Bokser 1986-87
- Murray Brown 1988-90
- David Henderson 1991-92, 1994–95
- Paul Henderson 1993
- Simon Culhane 1996-97
- Davin Heaps 1998
- Brett McCormack 1999
- Brendon Timmons 2000-01
- Steve Jackson 2002-03
- Clarke Dermody 2004-07
- Jamie Mackintosh 2008–15
- Brayden Mitchell 2016–17
- Flynn Thomas & James Wilson 2018–19
- Tony Lamborn 2020–21
- Josh Bekhuis 2022–23
- Sean Withy 2024-Present

=== Coaches ===
Southland's Coaches Since 1976 are:

- Bob Donnelly 1976
- Gus Burns 1977-79
- Robin Archer 1980-82
- Jack Borland, Harold Miller & Kevin Laidlaw 1983
- Kevin Laidlaw 1984-85
- John McAlley 1986-87
- Barry Leonard 1988-92
- Keith Robertson 1993-97
- Robert Telfer 1998-99
- Leicester Rutledge 2000-01
- Phil Young 2002-04
- Simon Culhane & David Henderson 2005-11
- David Henderson 2012-13
- Brad Mooar 2014-15
- Hoani MacDonald 2016–17
- Dave Hewett 2018–19
- Dale MacLeod 2020—22
- Matt Saunders 2023—24

=== Rugby Southland centurions ===
The following players have played over a hundred games for the Southland senior team. Listed in chronological order from Ack Soper in 1966 to most recently Tim Boys in 2014 the 15 are:

- Ack Soper - Country Pirates (103 games)
- Greg Spencer - Pirates (107 games)
- Gerald Dermody - Tokanui (120 games)
- Lin Booth - Star (100 games)
- Phil Butt - Star (100 games)
- Leicester Rutledge - Wrights Bush (113 games)
- Paul Laidlaw - Nightcaps (105 games)
- Brent Shepard - Woodlands (103 games)
- Simon Culhane - Invercargill (105 games)
- Jason Rutledge - Woodlands (143 games)
- Jimmy Cowan - Mataura (112 games)
- Jamie Mackintosh - Woodlands (123 games)
- David Hall - Pirates-Old Boys (108 games)
- Josh Bekhuis - Star (144 games)
- Tim Boys - Midlands (120 games)

=== All Blacks ===
There have been 59 players selected for the All Blacks whilst playing their club rugby in Southland. The first being Nisbet McRobie in 1896 and most recently Semisi Ta'eiloa in 2026.

- N McRobie
- Phil Jacob
- CA Purdue
- JW Stead
- GF Burgess
- E Purdue
- E Hughes
- DC Hamilton
- Frank Glasgow
- AJ Ridland
- J McNeece
- WG Lindsay
- DL Baird
- A White
- J Richardson
- JR Bell
- JA Archer
- WE Hazlett
- GT Alley
- JH Geddes
- J Howden
- TC Metcalfe
- GB Purdue
- NA Mitchell
- RH Ward
- VL George
- Arthur Wesney
- JA McRae
- TA Budd
- LS Connolly
- TRD Webster
- WA McCaw
- CE Robinson
- AL Wilson
- Arthur Woods
- James Archer
- AJ Soper
- JR Watt
- DL Ashby
- KF Laidlaw
- EJ Hazlett
- KW Stewart
- RJ Barber
- FJ Oliver
- BJ McKechnie
- LM Rutledge
- AA McGregor
- GT Valli
- ST Pokere
- PW Henderson
- NJ Hewitt
- SD Culhane
- QJ Cowan
- C Dermody
- JL Mackintosh
- LZ Sopoaga
- EC Dixon
- E de Groot
- SL Reece
- ST Ta'eiloa

=== Other notable players ===
- (New Zealand) Pita Alatini
- (Fiji) Seremaia Bai
- (New Zealand) Henry Braddon
- (New Zealand) Eion Crossan
- (New Zealand) Gus Dermody
- (New Zealand) Mal Dermody
- (New Zealand) Charlie Diack
- (New Zealand) Tuppy Diack
- (New Zealand) Pailate Fili
- (New Zealand) Corey Flynn
- (Scotland) John Hardie
- (New Zealand) David Hill
- (New Zealand) Arthur Holden
- (New Zealand) Edward J Kavanagh
- (New Zealand) Frank Kilby
- (New Zealand) Jack McKenzie
- (New Zealand) Justin Marshall
- (New Zealand) Harold Miller
- (New Zealand) Paul Miller
- (New Zealand) Wayne Miller
- (New Zealand) Josh Moorby
- (New Zealand) Ray Moreton
- (New Zealand) Bobby Murrell
- (New Zealand) Roger Newell
- (New Zealand) James O'Donnell
- (New Zealand) Bruce Pascoe
- (New Zealand) Robbie Robinson
- (New Zealand) Charles Saxton
- (New Zealand) Alex Sutherland
- (New Zealand) Pasilio Tosi
- (Tonga) Hale T-Pole
- (New Zealand) Kel Tremain
- (Tonga) Joe Tuineau
- (Samoa) To'o Vaega
- (Australia) Peter Ward
- (New Zealand) Jeff Wilson
