= Graham Shannon =

- Born: Hugh Graham Shannon; 13 June 1869 Nelson, New Zealand
- Died: 17 October 1912 (aged 43) Seacliff, New Zealand
- School: Wellington College, Wellington

Rugby union career
- Position: Halfback
Provincial / State sides
Years	Team	Apps	(Points)
1890-94	Manawatu Rugby Union		
International career
Years	Team	Apps	(Points)
1893	New Zealand	6	(9)

Hugh Graham Shannon (13 June 1869 – 17 October 1912) was a New Zealand rugby union player. Graham Shannon as he was commonly called was educated at Wellington College and later farmed in the Manawatu region.

He played at Halfback and represented the Manawatu Rugby Union at provincial level from 1890 to 1894 and had a NZ trial in 1893. He played club rugby for Marton and Feilding.

He was not an original selection but was called into the New Zealand national rugby union team on their 1893 tour of Australia due to the withdrawal of William Elliott and Charles Caradus. He played in six matches including one as a wing-forward. He scored 9 points for New Zealand from 3 tries:

- 2 against Northern Districts at the Newcastle Sports Ground
- 1 against Western Districts at the Bathurst Ground

His great-great-grandson Clarke Dermody was an All Black in 2006 and played for Southland and the Highlanders. Clarke Dermody also coached the Highlanders.
