= Ethan de Groot =

New Zealand rugby union player

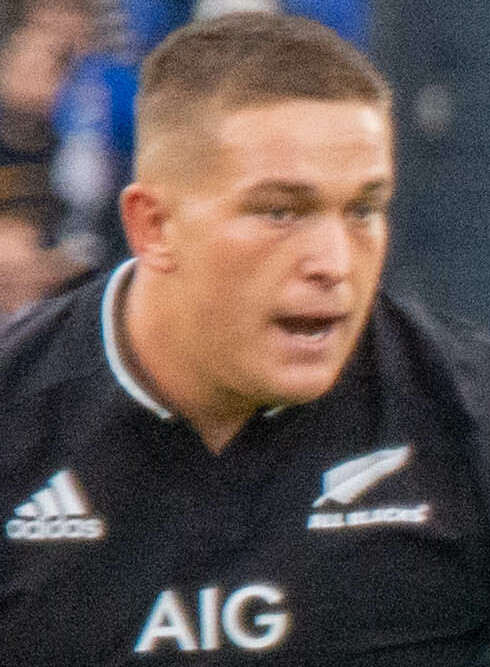
- De Groot representing New Zealand during the November Internationals
- Born: 22 July 1998 (age 28) Gold Coast, Queensland, Australia
- Height: 1.90 m (6 ft 3 in)
- Weight: 135 kg (298 lb; 21 st 4 lb)
- School: Southland Boys' High School in New Zealand; Gore High School

Rugby union career
- Position: Prop
- Current team: Southland, Highlanders
Senior career
Years	Team	Apps	(Points)
2018–	Southland	19	(0)
2020–	Highlanders	76	(35)
- Correct as of 17 October 2026
International career
Years	Team	Apps	(Points)
2021–	New Zealand	48	(30)
- Correct as of 21 November 2026
Medal record
Men's Rugby union
Representing New Zealand
Rugby World Cup
Silver medal – second place	2023 France	Squad

Ethan de Groot (born 22 July 1998) is a New Zealand rugby union player who plays as a prop for the Highlanders in Super Rugby and Southland in the National Provincial Championship. Born in Australia, he represents New Zealand at international level after qualifying on ancestry grounds.

== Early career ==
De Groot was born on the Gold Coast in Queensland, Australia. He attended Gore High School and then Southland Boys' High School for his final year in 2016. He played junior rugby for Albion-Excelsior and senior rugby for the Invercargill Rugby Club (Blues), winning the Galbraith Shield in 2019.

He signed for the Highlanders squad in 2020.

De Groot did two years of a building apprenticeship before focusing on rugby.

== International career ==
De Groot made his international debut for New Zealand on 10 July 2021 against Fiji at Dunedin, becoming the first Southlander to debut for the national side since Elliot Dixon in 2016. De Groot scored his first test try in a 104–14 win over the United States; the test match in which he first started for the All Blacks.

De Groot was not selected for Ian Foster's first All Black Squad in 2022, with Aidan Ross and Angus Ta’avao selected ahead of him. However, with the All Blacks being handed their first home series loss to Ireland, de Groot was re-selected for the 2022 Rugby Championship squad. De Groot became a regular starter for New Zealand in 2022, playing nine tests and scoring one try that season.

Retaining his role as the first-choice loosehead prop in 2023, de Groot was selected in Ian Foster's 33-man squad for the 2023 Rugby World Cup. De Groot became the first New Zealand player to be given a red card in a Rugby World Cup in the pool stage of the tournament. In this pool game against Namibia, a 71–3 win, he was initially given a yellow card for a high tackle on Adriaan Booysen, with a 'bunker' review upgrading it to a red. De Groot returned from a suspension to produce strong performances in New Zealand's quarter and semi-final fixtures against Ireland and Argentina respectively before he started in the World Cup final; an 11–12 loss to South Africa.
