= Joseph Bell (rugby union) =

- Born: Joseph Raymond Bell; 15 September 1899 Invercargill, New Zealand
- Died: 7 May 1963 (aged 63) Invercargill, New Zealand
- School: Southland Boys' High School
- Occupation: Train driver

Rugby union career
- Position: Five-eighth
Provincial / State sides
Years	Team	Apps	(Points)
1919–31	Southland	54	
International career
Years	Team	Apps	(Points)
1923	New Zealand	0	(0)
1922–31	New Zealand Māori	56	

Joseph Raymond "Wampy" Bell (15 September 1899 – 7 May 1963) was a New Zealand rugby union player. Primary a five eighth, Bell represented Southland at a provincial level. He played one match for the New Zealand national side, the All Blacks, against New South Wales at Christchurch in 1923. Of Ngāi Tahu descent, Bell played 56 games for New Zealand Māori between 1922 and 1931, and captained Southland.

Bell died in Invercargill in 1963, and was buried in the Eastern Cemetery, Invercargill.
