= Edward Kavanagh (sportsman) =

New Zealand rugby union player and cricketer (1888–1960)

- Born: Edward James Kavanagh; 3 July 1888 Invercargill, New Zealand
- Died: 16 March 1960 Hastings, New Zealand

Rugby union career
- Position: Fly-half (first five-eighth)
Provincial / State sides
Years	Team	Apps	(Points)
- Southland Rugby Football Union

Edward James Kavanagh (3 July 1888 – 16 March 1960) was a New Zealand Rugby Union and cricket player who captained the Southland Rugby Football Union and Southland cricket team. Kavanagh became one of Southland's finest all-round sporting sons.

== Rugby ==
It was at first five-eighth playing for Athletic Club where Kavanagh won his Southland representative cap. He captained the Southland rugby team in 1914 and the New Zealand Rifle Brigade rugby team in England during World War I.

== Cricket ==
Kavanagh graduated as one of the finest batsmen of his school and played his first representative game for Southland in the inaugural Hawke Cup of 1910–11, which saw Southland forced to play two away games and win. Kavanagh captained Southland several times and in 1921, he was called on to play against Australia. Those of his club and representative teammates claimed that but for a flaw in his concentration when compiling an innings, he would have been one of the best left-hand batsmen in New Zealand. He was also a top class spin bowler and a brilliant cover point fieldsman. Moving to the North Island, Kavanagh went on to play for Waikato, Hawke's Bay and the North Island XI.
