= Les George =

- Born: Victor Leslie George; 5 June 1908 Southland, New Zealand
- Died: 10 August 1996 (aged 88) Wānaka, New Zealand
- Height: 1.79 m (5 ft 10 1/2 in)
- Weight: 91 kg (14 st 5 lb)
- School: Otago Boys' High School
- Notable relative: David Hall - Grand Nephew

Rugby union career
- Position: Prop
Amateur team(s)
Years	Team	Apps	(Points)
- Invercargill (Blues)
Provincial / State sides
Years	Team	Apps	(Points)
1929–1939	Southland	66	(12)
International career
Years	Team	Apps	(Points)
1938	New Zealand	3	(0)

Victor Leslie George (5 June 1908 – 10 August 1996) was a New Zealand rugby union player.

== Life ==
George was born in Winton, New Zealand. His playing position was Prop.

Les or 'Tussock' as he was known, played 3 tests for the All Blacks on the 1938 tour of Australia. He also played 66 matches for Southland in the NPC.

The outbreak of World War II brought George's playing days to an end. After the War he was on the Southland union executive from 1949 to 1975, was the union president in 1956–57 and the representative selector-coach in 1956–64. He became a South Island selector in 1961 and from 1964 to 1970 was on the All Black selection panel. He was on the New Zealand union council in 1966–72.

George died on 10 August 1996 in Wānaka, New Zealand.
