= Jimmy Cowan =

NZ international rugby union player

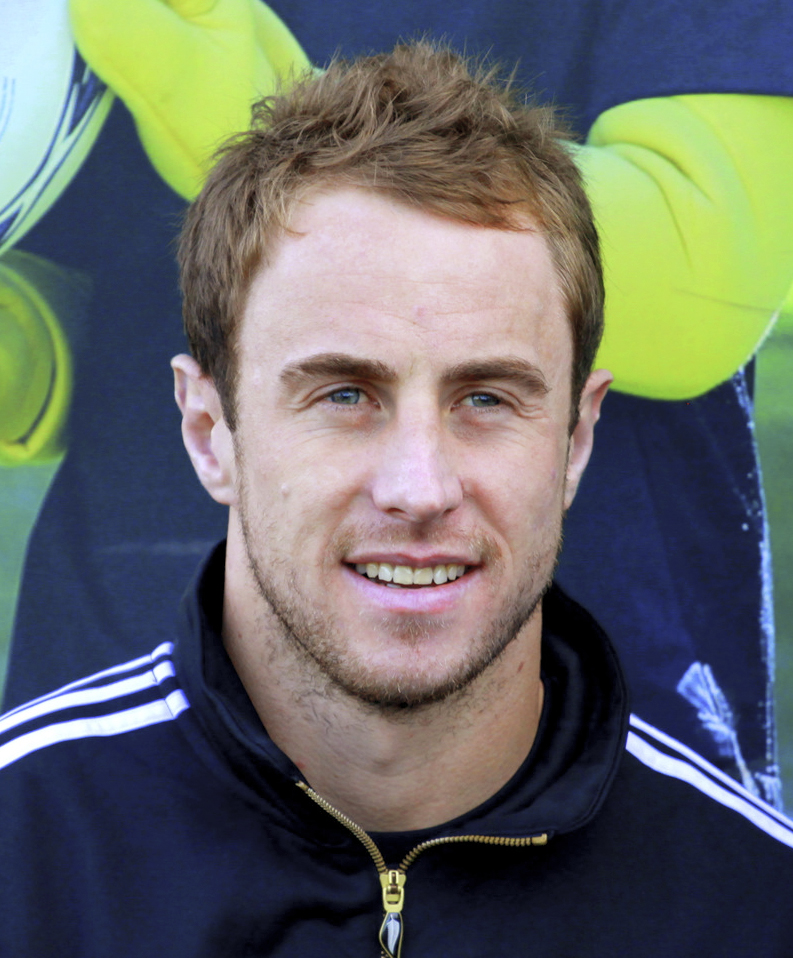
- Cowan during a Rugby World Cup visit, September 2011
- Full name: Quinton James Cowan
- Born: 6 March 1982 (age 44) Gore, New Zealand
- Height: 182 cm (6 ft 0 in)
- Weight: 95 kg (209 lb; 14 st 13 lb)
- School: Gore High School
- Notable relative: Scott Cowan (brother)

Rugby union career
- Position: Half-back
Senior career
| Years | Team | Apps | (Points) |
| 2000–2016 | Southland | 111 | (106) |
| 2003–2012 | Highlanders | 108 | (50) |
| 2012–2014 | Gloucester | 38 | (5) |
| 2014–2015 | Tasman | 23 | (40) |
| 2015 | Blues | 14 | (5) |
- Correct as of 9 June 2019
International career
| Years | Team | Apps | (Points) |
| 2002–2003 | New Zealand U21 | 10 | (20) |
| 2004–2011 | New Zealand | 53 | (35) |
| 2007 | Junior All Blacks | 5 | (0) |
| 2014 | Barbarian F.C. | 1 | (0) |
- Correct as of 9 June 2019

Quinton James Cowan (born 6 March 1982) is a New Zealand rugby union footballer. He first played for the All Blacks – New Zealand's national team – during the 2004 tour to the United Kingdom and France, and played his last Test match for the side during the 2011 Rugby World Cup. Cowan was born in Gore and attended Gore High School. After he left school a strong season for the Mataura Rugby Club saw him selected to play provincially for the Southland Stags in 2000. He was selected for the Highlanders in the 2003 Super 12 (now known as Super Rugby) season, and continued to play for both the Highlanders and Southland until signing for Gloucester in 2012.

== Career ==
=== Early years ===
Cowan was identified as a promising halfback, and is a product of New Zealand's rugby development program. In 2001, he was selected in New Zealand's World Cup Winning Under 19 team. In 2002 and 2003 he was also selected in the New Zealand Colts, winning the Under-21 Rugby World Cup in 2003.

=== Southland ===
Cowan debuted for the Stags in 2000 at the age of 18. He was quickly recognised as a standout in a weak Stags side and after a good season in 2002, he received a call-up to the Highlanders super rugby franchise. His form with the Southland side benefited from his experience at a higher level of rugby and the Stags back line continued to improve. In 2004, after a great National Provincial Championship competition, Cowan received an All Black call-up for the 2004 end of year tour after becoming the youngest Southlander to bring up 50 games for the province at the age of 22.

After missing out on the All Blacks squad to play the British and Irish Lions in 2005, he returned to the Stags where they came close to beating the Lions with only two Gavin Henson tries the difference. Once again he was a standout in the NPC resulting in a recall to the All Blacks for the end of year tour. Cowan missed much of the 2006 Air New Zealand Cup with All Blacks Tri Nations campaign before being dropped by the end of 2006. In 2007 after missing out once again on the All Blacks Cowan made a strong impression for the Stags helping them to reach the quarter final stages.

Since 2008, Cowan has played very few games due to being the All Blacks starting No. 9. He missed out on the Stags first successful Ranfurly Shield challenge in 51 years against Canterbury where his brother Scott took his place as halfback. Cowan was still a part of the win as a water carrier.

In September 2012, his final game for Southland before his move to Gloucester saw him reach 100 caps. He is one of only two New Zealanders to have ever registered a century for both his province and a Super Rugby franchise (the other being former All Black captain Tana Umaga).

=== Highlanders ===
After a strong 2002 NPC, Cowan was selected for the Highlanders for the 2003 Super 12 season. He was mentored by All Blacks Halfbacks Danny Lee and Byron Kelleher, who at the end of the season departed Otago and the Highlanders to play for Waikato and the Chiefs, leaving Cowan and Ben Hurst to battle for the starting role.

Cowan started a majority of the 2004 Super 12 season and at the end of the season became an All Black. When Tony Brown left the Highlanders in 2005, Cowan became a senior figure in an inexperienced backline and was recognised for his influence in the Highlanders side and good form with the New Zealand Super 14 Player of the Year Award. By the end of the season he had started to form an effective combination with Nick Evans. The combination was a positive in the Highlanders' poor start to the Super 14 competition. When Evans returned to the Blues in 2008, Cowan was left once again with an starless, inexperienced backline.

Over the next three years Cowan was a feature in a poor Highlanders side becoming captain in 2009. In 2011 with the appointment of a new coach Jamie Joseph, resulted in Jamie Mackintosh replacing Cowan as team captain.

In April 2012, Cowan became only the second player in the Highlanders' history to record a century of games (after Anton Oliver, 127). In 2012, the impressive form of new arrival Aaron Smith forced Cowan to become an impact player off the bench. Following the 2012 season and after 108 games for the Highlanders, with 26 as captain

=== All Blacks ===
Cowan made his All Black debut age 22, versus Italy, coming on as a substitute. In his first test he performed admirably with a probing running game, accurate passing and stout defence marking his performance. His first game as part of the starting line-up was against the Barbarians in 2004.

Cowan was next selected for the All Blacks during their successful 2005 Grand Slam Tour. During this tour Cowan played as a substitute in three test matches victories against Wales, Ireland and Scotland. During 2006, Cowan was one of the three halfbacks being used by the All Blacks for their successful Tri Nations Series. He played as a substitute in three games before starting in the final 20–21 loss to the Springboks.

In 2007, he was not selected for the All Blacks and missed out on the 2007 Rugby World Cup. Cowan was instead named in the Junior All Blacks for their victory in the Pacific Nations Cup.

In 2008, he began to appear regularly for the All Blacks, initially he was primarily used as a substitute. However, midway through the Tri Nations his good form was rewarded and he was recognised as the premier halfback. That November, Cowan was again selected for the All Blacks successful Grand Slam Tour. Coincidentally, it is also during this year that Cowan faced charges related to several incidents of drink-related disorderly behaviour. During a disciplinary hearing, the NZRU provided him with an ultimatum receive alcohol counseling and give up alcohol or lose his contract.

In 2010, Cowan spearheaded the All Black recovery from a poor 2009 Tri Nations. Despite recovering from a rib injury the All Blacks won every game with Cowan playing. He also played in the 2010 Hong Kong Bledisloe Cup Test game in Hong Kong, scoring a try for the All Blacks. Later that year Cowan played a key role in the All Blacks third successful Grand Slam in five years.

Cowan started the 2011 season as the incumbent All Black halfback; however, injuries and indifferent Super and International form resulted in his demotion to the third choice halfback behind Piri Weepu and Andy Ellis. Despite this, Cowan still played an important role in the All Blacks successful 2011 Rugby World Cup, where he played four games (two as substitute) against Tonga, Japan, Canada and Argentina (RWC Quarterfinal).

In total Cowan played 53 games for the All Blacks with 51 test matches.

=== Gloucester Rugby ===
On 17 April 2012, Jimmy Cowan would leave the Highlanders to join English side Gloucester Rugby in the Aviva Premiership for the 2012/13 season. He delayed his arrival at Gloucester so that he could play in the ITM Cup and reach the milestone of 100 appearances for Southland.

On 1 June 2014, Cowan was selected for the Barbarians defeating England 39–29 at Twickenham Stadium On 7 June 2014, Cowan was also selected for World XV, as a replacement from the bench, losing to South Africa 47–13 at Newlands Stadium in Cape Town, South Africa.

=== Return to New Zealand ===
On 14 July 2014, Cowan returned home to New Zealand as he joins Tasman Makos on a one-year contract in their next ITM Cup campaign. On 17 September 2014, Cowan signed for the Blues for the upcoming 2015 Super Rugby season.

== Playing style ==
Cowan is renowned for his competitive nature and determination. Former teammate Daniel Carter rates Cowan as one of the best defensive halfbacks going around, and says it was like having another loose forward in their side.

Coaches and teammates report that Cowan's strongest quality as a person, is his loyalty. In the 1990s and early 2000s, Southlanders Jeff Wilson, Justin Marshall, Mils Muliaina and Corey Flynn all shifted north to play for larger unions, as they looked to advance their prospects. At the beginning of his career, Cowan received several enticing offers from Super Rugby host provinces, but knocked them back to remain with the Stags and Highlanders.

Former All Blacks coach Sir Graham Henry said Cowan was one of the most well-respected players in the national squad and that he had the rare ability to relate with everyone in the team. "He was an extremely popular guy in the All Blacks. Probably, if the All Blacks had to vote on the ultimate team man, I think he would get the prize."
