= Paul Miller (rugby union) =

- Born: Paul Charles Miller; 31 August 1977 (age 49) Gore, New Zealand
- Height: 1.92 m (6 ft 4 in)
- Weight: 120 kg (260 lb)
- School: King's High School

Rugby union career
- Position: Number 8
Senior career
Years	Team	Apps	(Points)
2006–10	Kurita Water		
Provincial / State sides
Years	Team	Apps	(Points)
1998–99, 2002–05	Southland		
2000–02	Otago		
Super Rugby
Years	Team	Apps	(Points)
2000, 2005	Highlanders		
2003	Chiefs		
International career
Years	Team	Apps	(Points)
2001	New Zealand	0	(0)

Paul Charles Miller (born 31 August 1977) is a former New Zealand rugby union player. A number 8, Miller represented Southland and Otago at a provincial level, played for the Highlanders and Chiefs in Super Rugby. He was a member of the New Zealand national side, the All Blacks, in 2001, played two matches but no full internationals. Miller finished his professional career playing in Japan for Kurita Water RFC.

== Post-playing career ==
In 2024, Miller made his debut for Match Fit: Union vs. League. However: He had completely lost his right eye, and revealed that he had been diagnosed with cancer in 2022. Despite this: He already lost 25 kilos to 127 kg from just before he was diagnosed with cancer. It was revealed on episode 2 that he also had experience in rowing. In the combined code training, he realised that he should have switched codes sooner as his vision was less impaired due to the more upright style of tackling. He was also name the captain for Union due to him overcoming his health battles.
