= Henry Braddon =

Australian diplomat, businessman (1863-1955)

Sir Henry Braddon KBE
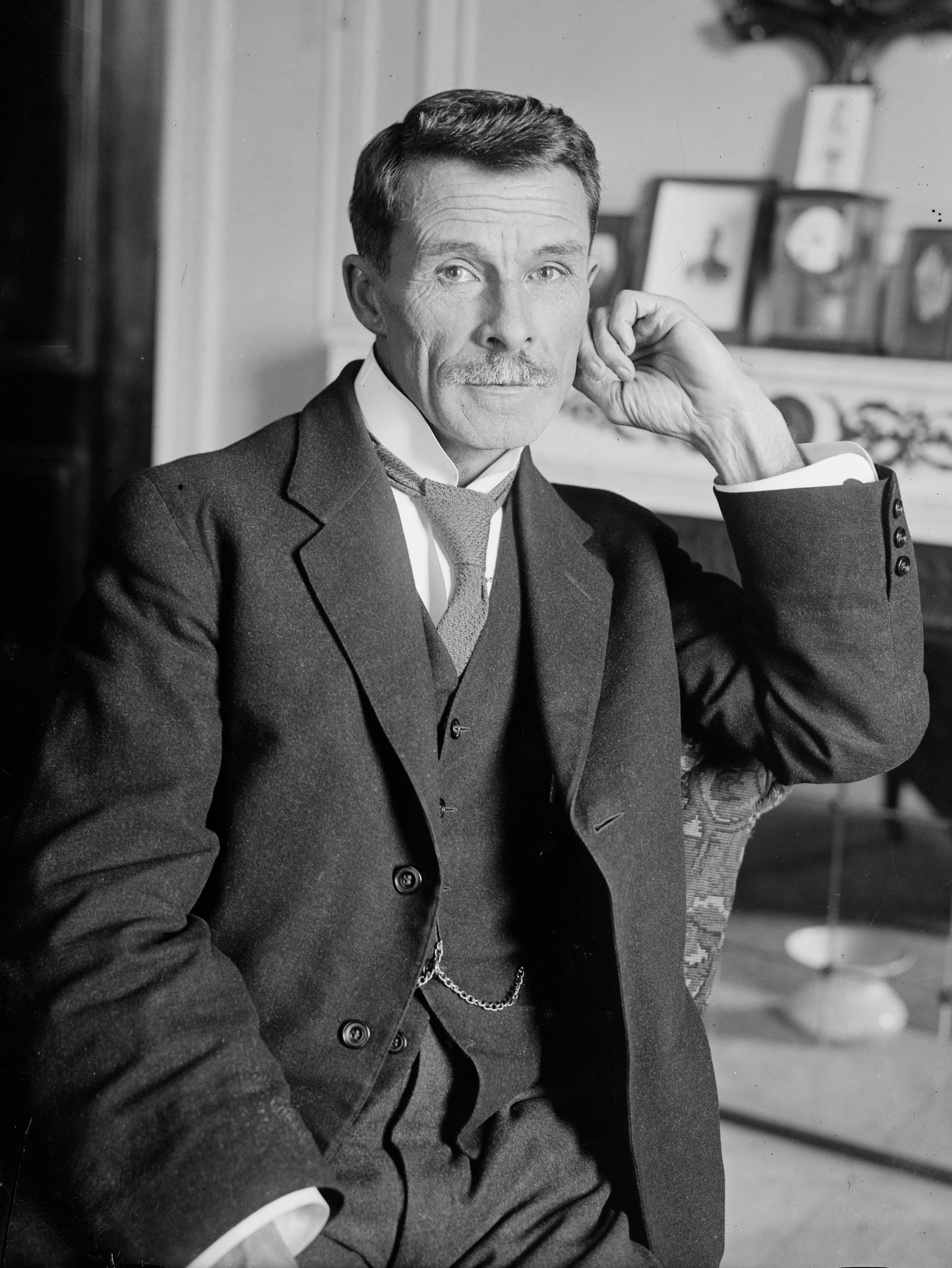
- Braddon in 1918
- Born: Henry Yule Braddon; 27 April 1863 Calcutta, India
- Died: 8 September 1955 (aged 92) Woollahra, New South Wales, Australia
- School: Dulwich College; Launceston Church Grammar School
- Notable relative(s): Edward Braddon (father); Mary Elizabeth Braddon (aunt)

Rugby union career
- Position(s): Fullback, wing
Amateur team(s)
Years	Team	Apps	(Points)
1882–84	Invercargill		
Provincial / State sides
Years	Team	Apps	(Points)
1883–84	Otago		
1888–92	New South Wales		
International career
Years	Team	Apps	(Points)
1884	New Zealand	7 (0 tests)	(0)

Sir Henry Yule Braddon KBE (27 April 1863 – 8 September 1955) was an Australian diplomat, businessman, and rugby union player who played for Otago, New South Wales and New Zealand.

== Early life and education ==
Henry Yule Braddon was born on 27 April 1863 in Calcutta, India, to Alice Smith and (Sir) Edward Braddon, later Premier of Tasmania (1894–1899). He was educated in Germany, France, and Dulwich College, England, before his family emigrated to Australia in 1878, where he completed his education at Church of England Grammar School, Launceston.

== Rugby ==
Braddon moved to Invercargill in 1882 on transfer with the Bank of Australasia. He played his club rugby for Invercargill Rugby Club but his provincial rugby for Otago as the Invercargill-centred Southland Rugby Football Union did not split away from Otago until 1887. He was selected for the first New Zealand international team, and played in seven of the eight games in Australia in 1884 and is recognised as an Otago's first All Black despite playing in Invercargill at the time of his selection. Braddon later played for New South Wales from 1888 until 1892. The position he generally played in was fullback. In the 1920s he became president of the NSW Rugby Union.

Braddon is listed as the second All Black in playing order. Following the death of Henry Roberts in 1949, Braddon was the oldest living All Black.

== Career ==
On leaving school Braddon worked for the Commercial Bank of Tasmania.

Braddon had a commercial and political career in Australia, working for Dalgetys and representing Australia as Commonwealth Commissioner in the United States. He was appointed a member of the New South Wales Legislative Council in 1917 and was an indirectly-elected member of that body from 1934 to 1940.

== Other activities ==
In July 1936, the British-American Cooperation Movement for World Peace was founded in Sydney by two Australian World War I veterans, Brigadier H. A. Goddard and Sir Ernest Keith White, and the movement was led by Braddon. Braddon addressed a campaign launch in Brisbane in August of that year, citing support from the Rotary International, chambers of commerce, and other clubs. He later went to Melbourne to campaign for the movement there. This movement was revived as the Australian American Association by Keith Murdoch in 1941.

== Honours and death ==
Braddon was appointed a Knight Commander of the Order of the British Empire in 1920.

Braddon died in the Sydney suburb of Woollahra in 1955.

Records
Preceded by Henry Roberts	Oldest living All Black; 1 January 1949 – 8 September 1955	Succeeded by Robert Oliphant
