= Alistair Soper =

New Zealand rugby union player (1936–2020)

- Born: Alistair John Soper; 7 September 1936 Invercargill, New Zealand
- Died: 16 June 2020 (aged 83) Invercargill, New Zealand
- Height: 1.83 m (6 ft 0 in)
- Weight: 88 kg (194 lb)
- School: Waitaki Boys' High School

Rugby union career
- Position: Number 8
Provincial / State sides
Years	Team	Apps	(Points)
1954–59, 61–66	Southland	103	
International career
Years	Team	Apps	(Points)
1957	New Zealand	0	(0)

Alistair John "Ack" Soper (7 September 1936 – 16 June 2020) was a New Zealand rugby union player.

A number eight, Soper represented Southland at a provincial level, and was a member of the New Zealand national side, the All Blacks, on their 1957 tour of Australia. He played eight matches for the All Blacks on that tour, but did not appear in any internationals. He served as president of the Southland Rugby Union in 1985.

Soper played for the English club Blackheath in the 1960–61 season.

Soper died in Invercargill on 16 June 2020, aged 83.
