= Kevin Laidlaw =

New Zealand Rugby union player (1934–2024)

- Born: Kevin Francis Laidlaw; 9 August 1934 Nightcaps, New Zealand
- Died: 30 July 2024 (aged 89) Invercargill, New Zealand
- Height: 1.78 m (5 ft 10 in)
- Weight: 77 kg (170 lb)
- School: St Kevin's College

Rugby union career
- Position: Centre
Senior career
Years	Team	Apps	(Points)
1956–1962	Southland	59	
International career
Years	Team	Apps	(Points)
1960	New Zealand	3	(0)
Coaching career
- Years: Team
- Southland

Kevin Francis Laidlaw (9 August 1934 – 30 July 2024) was a New Zealand rugby union player and coach. He played for the national team, the All Blacks in 1960, and later coached the Southland provincial team. He is the only All Black from Ohai-Nightcaps.

Laidlaw represented New Zealand in 17 games, including three tests. He made his test debut for New Zealand against South Africa at Cape Town on 23 July 1960. His last test was also against South Africa, at Port Elizabeth on 27 August 1960.

Laidlaw was educated at St Kevin's College, Oamaru. He died in Invercargill on 30 July 2024, at the age of 89. His son Paul was a Southland rugby representative in the 1980s.
