= Ray Moreton =

- Born: Raymond Claude Moreton; 30 January 1942 Invercargill, New Zealand
- Died: 20 July 2016 (aged 74) Auckland, New Zealand
- Height: 1.75 m (5 ft 9 in)
- Weight: 78 kg (172 lb)
- School: Southland Boys' High School
- Occupation: Accountant

Rugby union career
- Position: Second five-eighth, centre
Provincial / State sides
Years	Team	Apps	(Points)
1961	Southland	7	
1962–65	Canterbury		
International career
Years	Team	Apps	(Points)
1962–65	New Zealand	7	(9)
1962–65	NZ Universities		

Raymond Claude "Ray" Moreton (30 January 1942 – 20 July 2016) was a New Zealand rugby union player. A second five-eighth and centre, Moreton represented Southland and Canterbury at a provincial level. He was a member of the New Zealand national side, the All Blacks, from 1962 to 1965, playing in 12 matches including seven internationals, and scoring seven tries and one drop goal in all.
