= Midlands Rugby Club =

Midlands RFC
- Full name: Midlands Rugby Football Club
- Founded: 1989
- Ground(s): Centennial Park, 38-40 John Street, Winton
- President: Aaron McDowell
- Coach: Ben Collins
- Captain: Ben Foy
- League: Invercargill Licensing Trust Southland Wide Division Two
Team kit

Midlands Rugby Football Club is a New Zealand amateur rugby team that plays in the Go Bus Southland Wide Second Division. The team joined the second division in 2024 after playing in the premier grade from 2021 to 2023. The team has included Stags Tim Boys and former Highlander Matt Saunders. Its most recent Southland representative was Joe Robins (9 Matches). Midlands Rugby Football club won the Ack Soper Shield in 2019.
