= Josh Bekhuis =

- Born: Joshua James George Bekhuis; 26 April 1986 (age 40) Invercargill, Southland, New Zealand
- Height: 2.00 m (6 ft 7 in)
- Weight: 116 kg (18 st 4 lb)
- School: Southland Boys' High School

Rugby union career
- Position: Lock
Senior career
Years	Team	Apps	(Points)
2016–2018	Lyon	38	(0)
2018–2020	Honda Heat	21	(15)
2021–2022	Shimizu Blue Sharks	9	(10)
- Correct as of 22 February 2021
Provincial / State sides
Years	Team	Apps	(Points)
2006–15 22-24	Southland	144	(55)
Super Rugby
Years	Team	Apps	(Points)
2009–14	Highlanders	82	(10)
2015–16	Blues	28	(0)

Joshua Bekhuis /ˈbɛkjuəs/ (born 26 April 1986) is a professional rugby union player who plays at lock for Honda Heat in the Japanese Top League competition.

== Playing career ==
=== Provincial Rugby ===
Bekhuis began his career with Southland in 2006 after a successful time with the Southland Boys' High School First XV. After making two starts in his debut season, he emerged as a regular starter during the 2007 Air New Zealand Cup.

He followed up his debut Super Rugby season with an exceptional 2009 Air New Zealand Cup, during which he made 14 starts and scored 4 tries, and was a key figure in Southland's Ranfurly Shield triumph over Canterbury.

By the conclusion of his 18-year career with Southland, he had made 144 appearances for his province.

=== Super Rugby ===
Bekhuis' reliable performances for Southland saw him earning a Super Rugby contract with the Highlanders for the 2009 season. He had a fine first campaign, appearing in every game and making 8 starts. He would further build on that during the 2010 Super 14 season, starting every match for the Highlanders.

During the 2011 Super Rugby season, Bekhuis appeared in every match for the Highlanders for the third season in a row, bringing his consecutive games streak to 42.

After being relegated to coming off the bench for the Highlanders in 2014, Bekhuis signed with the Blues on a 2-year contract. He was a regular starter for the franchise for both seasons before signing in Europe in 2016.

=== France and Japan ===
Bekhuis signed in France with Lyon in 2016 and spent two seasons with the club, primarily coming off the bench.no

He move to the Japanese Top League in 2018, signing with the Honda Heat.
