= Corey Flynn =

New Zealand rugby union player

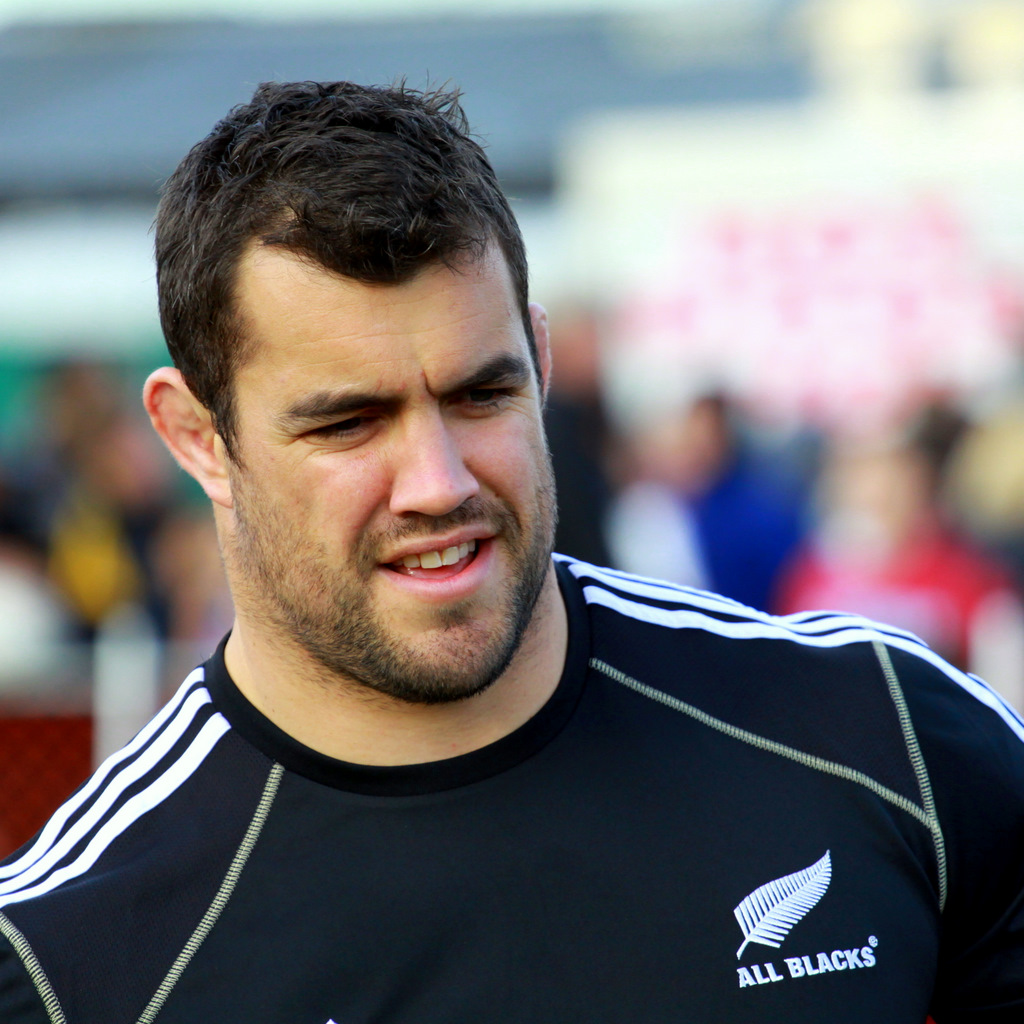
- Flynn in 2011
- Born: Corey Robert Flynn; 5 January 1981 (age 45) Invercargill, New Zealand
- Height: 1.84 m (6 ft 0 in)
- Weight: 108 kg (17 st 0 lb)
- School: Southland Boys' High School
- Notable relative(s): Robbie Flynn (uncle); Aaron Flynn (uncle); David Flynn (Cousin)

Rugby union career
- Position: Hooker
Amateur team(s)
Years	Team	Apps	(Points)
- Star Rugby Club
Senior career
Years	Team	Apps	(Points)
2014-16	Toulouse	42	(5)
2016-17	Glasgow Warriors	16	(15)
Provincial / State sides
Years	Team	Apps	(Points)
2001–02	Southland	17	
2003–14	Canterbury	70	(25)
2017	West Coast	6	
- Correct as of 8 October 2017
Super Rugby
Years	Team	Apps	(Points)
2002–14	Crusaders	150	(100)
International career
Years	Team	Apps	(Points)
2002	Māori All Blacks		
2003–11	New Zealand	15	(15)

Corey Robert Flynn (born 5 January 1981) is a New Zealand former rugby union player who most recently played for the West Coast in the Heartland Championship. He played in the position of hooker.

== Career ==
=== Club career ===
Flynn previously played provincial for Southland until he moved to Canterbury in 2003; has played Super Rugby rugby for the Crusaders; and has played in Top 14 for Toulouse.

On 29 February 2016 it was announced that Flynn would sign for Glasgow Warriors at the end of the 2015–16 season.

Flynn had already played in Scotstoun with Toulouse and stated: "When I played at Scotstoun last season, the atmosphere was fantastic and it shows the club has a really good support base. I jumped at the chance to join the Warriors after chatting to Gregor and I'm good friends with Scotland full-back Sean Maitland and he couldn't say enough good things about Glasgow."

On 26 May 2017 it was announced that Flynn was no longer contracted by the Warriors.

=== International career ===
Flynn made his international debut for the All Blacks against Canada after a surprise selection ahead of Anton Oliver in the 2003 Rugby World Cup. He has also played for New Zealand Maori and the Junior All Blacks. On 31 May 2006, Flynn was named captain of the Junior All Blacks after Reuben Thorne declined the role.

== Biography ==
He was educated at Southland Boys' High School.

Flynn comes from a family with a long history in rugby with his father and two uncles playing for Southland Rugby. One of his uncles, Robbie Flynn, played rugby for the United States, Aaron Flynn, also played for the Crusaders from 1998 to 2002.

== After rugby ==
He returned in 2021/22 for season 2 of Match Fit. He revealed that he lost much of his skills as a lineout thrower, and his career had been marred by shoulder, elbow and ankle injuries, but his anger and frustrations spills over as they were misdirected towards coaches, and also developed drinking problems until he recovered in 2011.

Since retiring, Flynn became a Project Manager for Mike Greer Homes in Christchurch.
