= Leicester Rutledge =

Leicester Rutledge MNZM
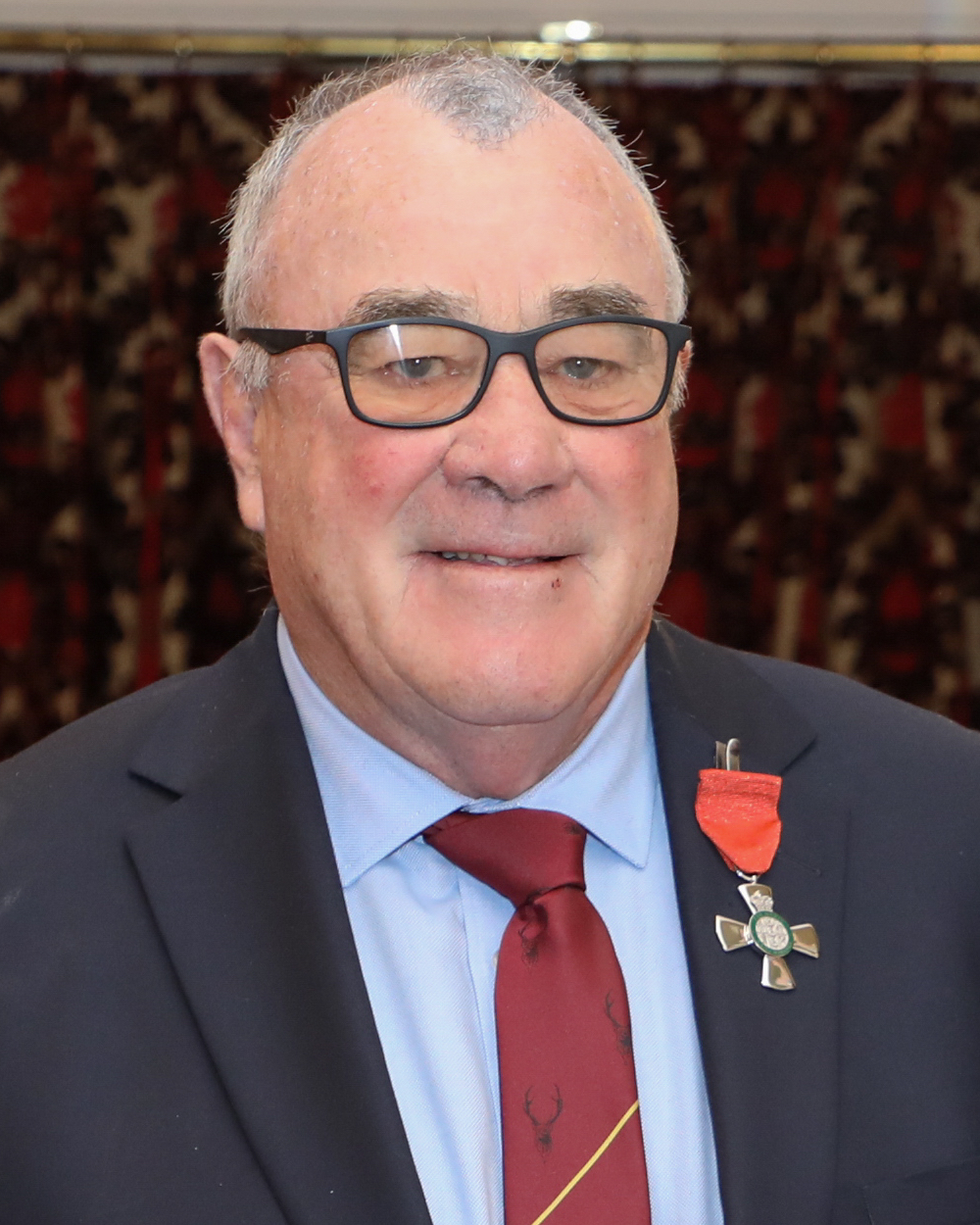
- Rutledge in 2022
- Born: Leicester Malcolm Rutledge; 12 April 1952 (age 74) Christchurch, New Zealand
- Height: 1.85 m (6 ft 1 in)
- Weight: 92 kg (203 lb)
- School: Riccarton High School
- Notable relative: Jason Rutledge (son)

Rugby union career
- Position: Flanker
Provincial / State sides
Years	Team	Apps	(Points)
1972–83	Southland	113	
International career
Years	Team	Apps	(Points)
1978–80	New Zealand	13	(0)

Leicester Malcolm Rutledge MNZM (born 12 April 1952) is a New Zealand former rugby union player. As a flanker, Rutledge represented Southland at a provincial level, and was a member of the New Zealand national side (the All Blacks), from 1978 to 1980. He played 31 matches for the All Blacks, including 13 internationals, and captained the side in one match against Combined Services on the 1978 tour of Britain and Ireland.

In the 2022 New Year Honours, Rutledge was appointed a Member of the New Zealand Order of Merit, for services to rugby and the community.
