= Marist Rugby Club (Invercargill) =

(New Zealand) Marist
- Full name: Marist Old Boys Rugby Football Club - Invercargill
- Union: Southland Rugby Football Union
- Founded: 1920; 106 years ago
- Location: Invercargill, New Zealand
- Ground: Miller Street
- Coach: Marty Smith
- Captain: Jackson Bevin
- League: Southlandwide Premier Galbraith Shield
1st kit	2nd kit

Official website
- www.maristinvercargill.co.nz

Invercargill Marist Rugby Football Club is an amateur New Zealand rugby union club based in the Southland Region of New Zealand. Their senior team plays in the Southlandwide Premier Division for the Galbraith Shield. The club boasts one of the most loyal supporters groups in the region which can be credited to Peter D Grace, the founder of the Supporters Club. The current team captained by former New Zealand Under-20 representative Scott Eade features five current Southland representatives. The local patron of the rugby club is Nathan "Birdman" Burgess.

== Club Honours ==
The Marist club has produced numerous Southland representatives and five All Blacks, the most recent being Paul Henderson in the 1990s.

Galbraith Shield Wins (7): 1940, 1948, 1957, 1979, 2001, 2017, 2018

Club All Blacks:

- J.A McRae - 1946
- L.S Connolly - 1947
- W.A McCaw - 1951–54
- F.J Oliver 1976–77
- P.W Henderson 1989–93
- Pasilio Tosi - 2024–present

New Zealand XV:

- M.P Grace 1939–45

Junior All Blacks/New Zealand Under-20:

- K.J McRae - 1967–68
- F.J Oliver - 1969
- S Eade - 2011–12
- T Raimona - 2012
- F Thomas - 2018

New Zealand Maori:

- H MacDonald - 2004

New Zealand Under 17:

- J Templar - 1991

New Zealand Marist:

- I Sipa - 1998
- S Ripley - 1998
