= Shaun Yeo =

New Zealand cartoonist and illustrator (b. 1974)

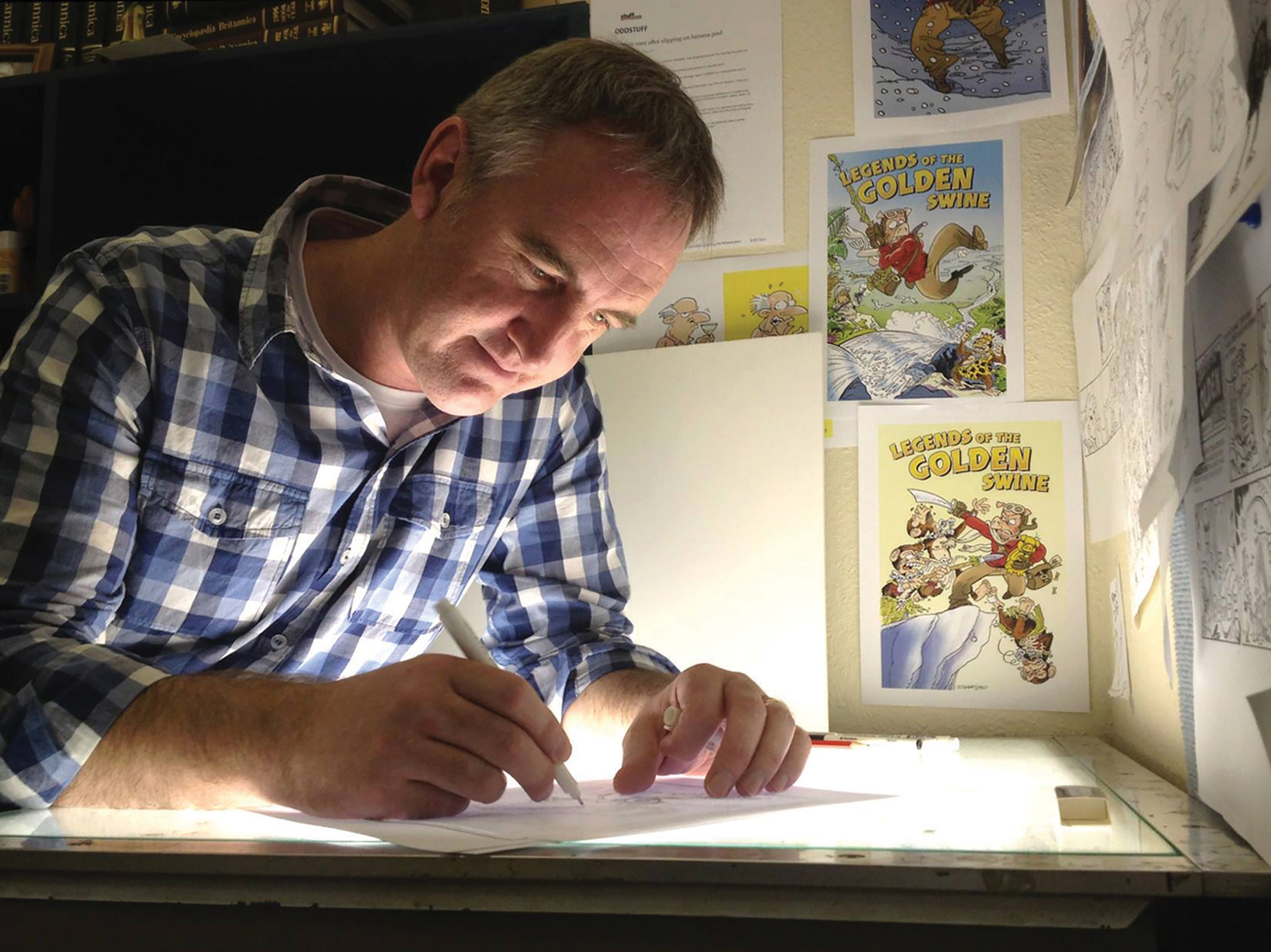
- Born: 1974 (age 51–52) Winton, New Zealand
- Areas: Cartoonist, Illustrator
- Notable works: "Crying Kiwi"; The King, the Crown and the Dragon

Shaun Yeo (born 1974) is a New Zealand freelance cartoonist and illustrator living in Invercargill. He produces daily political cartoons for the Otago Daily Times.

For 28 years, from 1991 through to 2019, his cartoons were published in The Southland Times newspaper.

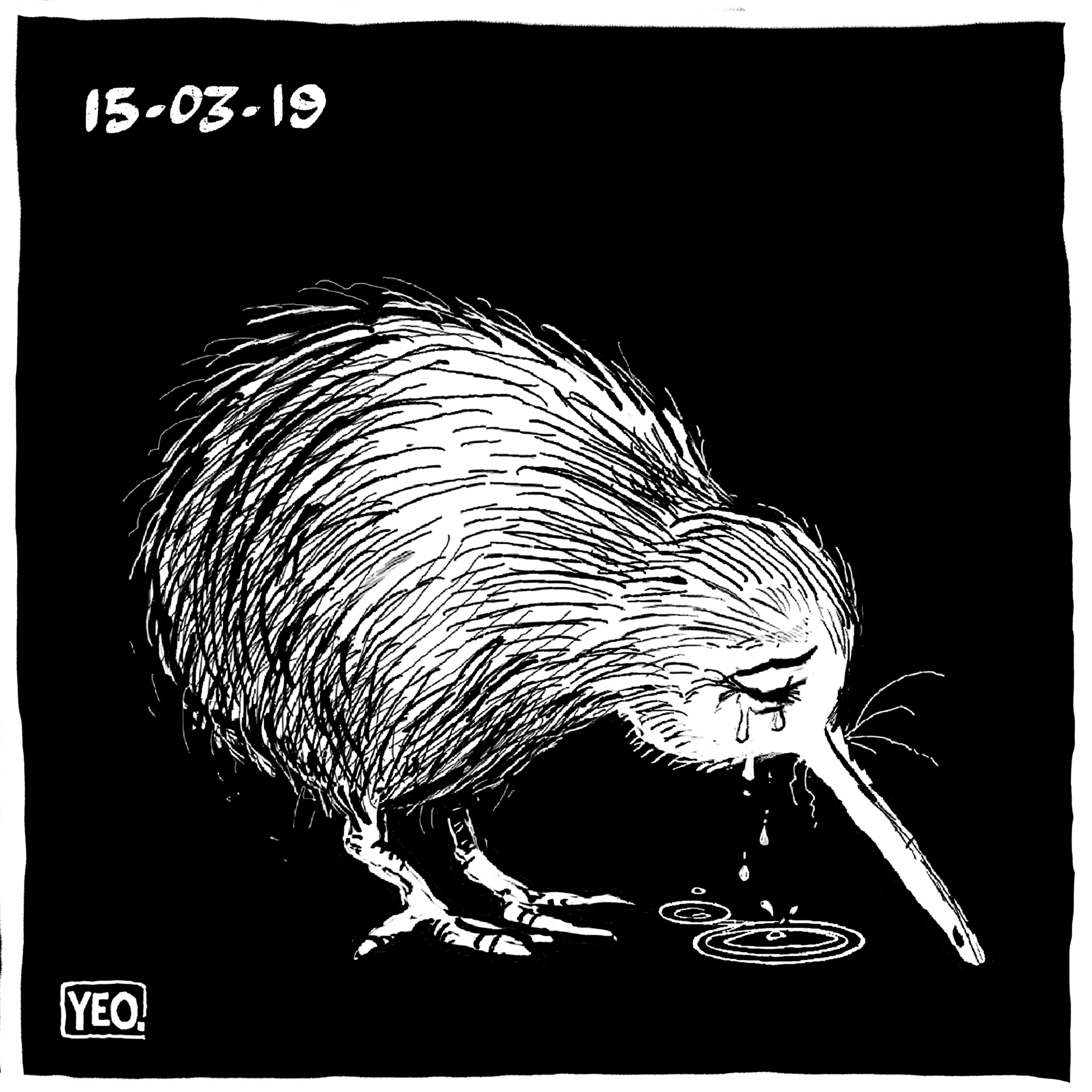
"Crying Kiwi", created in response to the death of 51 people in the Christchurch mosque shootings

As well as his work for The Southland Times, Yeo also supplied cartoons, illustrations and caricatures to many of the newspapers and magazines owned by Stuff Limited, working full-time for the company from 2001 through to 2018. From 2013 through to 2018 Yeo was the political cartoonist for the Sunday News. In May 2018, Yeo began a career as a freelance cartoonist and illustrator, with a focus on children's book illustrations; in 2006 he had written and illustrated his own book, The King, the Crown and the Dragon.

In 2009, Yeo was a finalist at the Qantas Media Awards in the Best Art category and in 2017 was named a finalist in the Cartoonist of the Year category at the Canon Media Awards. In 2018, he was named a finalist in both the Best Artwork/Graphics and Cartoonist of the Year categories at the Voyager Media Awards. In 2019 and 2021 he was again named a finalist in the Cartoonist of the Year category.

Since 2015, his work has been collected by the New Zealand Cartoon Archive, part of the Alexander Turnbull Library which wrote "... Yeo’s colourful work ... combines a comic art style with political and social commentary..."

Yeo's illustration "Crying Kiwi" was created in response to the Christchurch mosque shootings on 15 March 2019, and was widely printed and shared in the aftermath of the attacks. Described as "perfectly capturing this shocking and horrendous tragedy", in the first two days after the shootings it was viewed by 3.4 million people.

== Bibliography ==
- The Terribly Tired Try-Anything Tuatara (2003)
- Henry the Southern Man Tuatara (2005)
- The King, the Crown and the Dragon (2006)
- The ANZAC Biscuit Man (2019)
- Moa's Ark (2020)
- Midmost Marvin (2020)
- Pigs in Sheds (2020)
- Duggie the Buggy (2021)
