= Leo Connolly (rugby union) =

- Full name: Leo Stephen Connolly
- Born: 2 December 1921 Invercargill, New Zealand
- Died: 10 April 2005 (aged 83) Wellington, New Zealand
- Height: 1.78 m (5 ft 10 in)
- Weight: 96 kg (212 lb)
- School: Southland Boys' High School
- Occupation: Insurance representative

Rugby union career
- Position: Prop
International career
| Years | Team | Apps | (Points) |
| 1947 | New Zealand | | |

Leo Stephen Connolly (2 December 1921 — 10 April 2005) was a New Zealand rugby union international.

Connolly was born in Invercargill and attended Southland Boys' High School.

Debuting for Southland in 1940, Connolly played his early rugby with Invercargill Marist, before turning out for Otago between 1943 and 1946, while based in Dunedin. After returning to Marist, he gained All Blacks selection for the 1947 tour of Australia, appearing in five uncapped matches. He was in contention for the 1949 tour of South Africa until suffering a broken ankle. He finished his career at Waikato and later coached St Patrick's College, Wellington.

== See also ==
- List of New Zealand national rugby union players
