= Jason Rutledge =

NZ rugby union player (born 1977)

- Born: 15 December 1977 (age 48) Invercargill, New Zealand
- Height: 1.75 m (5 ft 9 in)
- Weight: 100 kg (15 st 10 lb)

Rugby union career
- Position: Hooker
Senior career
Years	Team	Apps	(Points)
2000−20	Southland	143	(95)
2004, 2009-13	Highlanders	59	(40)
- Correct as of End of NPC 2020

Jason Rutledge (born 15 December 1977) is a New Zealand rugby union player who played provincial rugby for Southland, and was in the Super Rugby team the Highlanders.

Jason is the son of 1978-1980 All Black Leicester Rutledge who also played over 100 matches for Southland from 1972 to 1983.

Rutledge made his debut for the Highlanders in 2004, but after playing two games that season, did not return to the Highlanders until the 2009 season. He came on as a substitution for David Hall in the season opener against the Brumbies, scoring a try minutes from full-time which briefly put the Highlanders in the lead.

On 13 September 2020, Jason came on the field as a replacement for Greg Pleasants-Tate in the 72nd minute in Southland's first Mitre 10 Cup fixture for the season, against Hawke's Bay. He helped Southland defend their line for a 16–10 victory. This appearance, 20 years after his debut for Southland, made him the province's oldest player.
