= Invercargill Rugby Club (Blues) =

NZ rugby union club, based in Invercargill

(New Zealand) Blues
- Full name: Invercargill Blues RC
- Founded: 1874; 152 years ago
- Ground: Balmoral Drive
- President: Darryl Olphert
- Coach(es): James Wilson, Ben Paulin, Mike Cunningham; Management - Tori Clarke
- Captain: Richard Little
- League(s): Premier Division, Women's, Bs, Cs
Team kit

Blues RC (Invercargill) is an amateur rugby union team that plays in the Premier Division of Southland Club Rugby. Founded in 1874, the club has a prestigious history, and it boasts 31 Galbraith Shield titles including a record period of eight in a row.

The club also has a strong women's rugby team.

== Notable players ==
Blues has had many players achieve Southland Stags honours as well as a number of All Blacks and other New Zealand representatives.

The following have represented the All Blacks.

Player	All Black number	Year of All Black debut
Henry Braddon	2	1884
Simon Culhane	946	1995
Ethan de Groot	1197	2021
Elliot Dixon	1149	2016
Les George	439	1938
Paul Henderson	897	1989
James O'Donnell	9	1884
Steven Pokere	825	1981

The club has also had a representative of the New Zealand women's national rugby union team (Black Ferns), Amy Rule.

Other notable players include:

- Michael Fatialofa
- David Henderson
- Kendrick Lynn
- Jay Renton, New Zealand under-20 representative
- Daniel Townson
- James Wilson
- John Hayes, Irish and British and Lions Test player

== Galbraith Shield victories ==
- 1911 & 1912
- 1930 & 1931
- 1936 & 1937
- 1939
- 1945-1947
- 1958
- 1964
- 1967
- 1970 & 1971
- 1974
- 1977
- 1981-1983
- 1987-1994
- 2003
- 2005
- 2019

== See also ==
- Blues Invercargill
- Southland Rugby Clubs
- Howitt, Bob. Article: Southland's oldest club. Rugby News magazine (November 2023). Charlotte Smulders (Publisher), New Zealand.
