= Jack Taylor (rugby union, born 2003) =

New Zealand rugby union player

- Born: 25 June 2003 (age 23) New Zealand
- Height: 181 cm (5 ft 11 in)
- Weight: 109 kg (240 lb; 17 st 2 lb)
- School: Southland Boys' High School
- University: University of Otago

Rugby union career
- Position: Hooker
- Current team: Highlanders, Southland
Senior career
Years	Team	Apps	(Points)
2023–	Highlanders	29	(0)
2023–	Southland	29	(0)
- Correct as of 16 August 2023
International career
Years	Team	Apps	(Points)
2023–	New Zealand U20	5	(5)
- Correct as of 16 August 2023

Jack Taylor (born 25 June 2003) is a New Zealand rugby union player, who plays for the Highlanders and Southland. His preferred position is hooker.

== Early career ==
Taylor studied at Southland Boys' High School and studies at Otago University. He was a member of the Highlanders U20 squad, and represented New Zealand at junior age grade levels. He was selected for New Zealand U20 in 2023.

== Professional career ==
Taylor first came to prominence professionally in the pre-season of 2023, when he scored two tries for the Highlanders in a friendly against the Crusaders. He was called into the Highlanders squad during the 2023 Super Rugby Pacific season ahead of the Round 5 fixture against the Drua, debuting in the same match. Ahead of the 2023 Bunnings NPC, he was named in the Southland squad for the first time.
