= Bob Barber (rugby union) =

New Zealand rugby player (born 1945)

- Born: Robert John Barber; 14 January 1945 (age 81) Oamaru, New Zealand
- Height: 1.89 m (6 ft 2 in)
- Weight: 97 kg (214 lb)
- School: Waitaki Boys' High School

Rugby union career
- Position: Utility forward
Provincial / State sides
Years	Team	Apps	(Points)
1963	North Otago		
1967	Canterbury	4	
1968–78	Southland		
International career
Years	Team	Apps	(Points)
1972–76	New Zealand Māori		
1974	New Zealand	0	(0)

Robert John Barber (born 14 January 1945) is a former New Zealand rugby union player. A utility forward, Barber represented North Otago, Canterbury and Southland at a provincial level, and was a member of the New Zealand national side, the All Blacks, on their 1974 tour of Australia and Fiji. He played six matches on that tour but did not appear in any full test matches, although he did turn out in the game against Fiji.

His daughter, Verity McLean, was killed in Invercargill in April 2017. Her husband, a serving police officer, was charged with her murder.
