= John Hardie (rugby union) =

Scotland international rugby union player

- Born: John Hardie; 27 July 1988 (age 38) Lumsden, New Zealand
- Height: 1.83 m (6 ft 0 in)
- Weight: 103 kg (16 st 3 lb; 227 lb)
- School: Southland Boys' High School

Rugby union career
- Position: Flanker
Senior career
Years	Team	Apps	(Points)
2015–2018	Edinburgh	31	(25)
2018–2021	Newcastle Falcons	20	(0)
Provincial / State sides
Years	Team	Apps	(Points)
2007–2014	Southland	65	(65)
Super Rugby
Years	Team	Apps	(Points)
2010–2015	Highlanders	53	(20)
International career
Years	Team	Apps	(Points)
2015–2020	Scotland	16	(15)

John Hardie (born 27 July 1988) is a former New Zealand rugby union player who played most recently for Newcastle Falcons. Hardie predominantly played as an open side flanker. He represented Scotland internationally between 2015 and 2022.

== Playing career ==
=== Club career ===
As a student of Southland Boys High School he was in the first XV for three years from 2004 to 2006 earning New Zealand Secondary Schools selection in his final year. The following year he was a member of the New Zealand Under 19 team which won the 2007 IRB World Championships in Ireland.

He made his Southland debut in 2007 against Otago, and emerged as a full-time starter during the 2009 Air New Zealand Cup, appearing in every match and scoring three tries. He continued to be a key member of the squad as the Stags defended the Ranfurly Shield for the greater part of the 2010 ITM Cup season. Another outstanding season with the Stags in 2011, in which they regained the Ranfurly Shield from Canterbury, saw him named Stags player of the year and also Southland Supporters Club player of the year for the second year. In 2013, Hardie again won the Stags player of the year and also the players player title. In 2014, he again won player of the year title.

Based on his strong performance in the 2009 Air New Zealand Cup, Hardie was included in the Highlanders squad for the 2010 Super 14 season. Serving mainly as backup to starting flankers Adam Thomson and Alando Soakai, he made 11 appearances over the course of the 13-game season, including three starts.

In 2012, with the departure of Soakai to Japan, Hardie emerged as the starting openside flanker, but was sidelined with a serious toe injury.

While the Highlanders had a poor 2013, Hardie was one of the teams outstanding performers, leading the team in tackles completed, pilfers and runs made.

Following the World Cup he joined Edinburgh Rugby for the Pro14 2015/2016 Season.

After being released by Edinburgh in 2018, Hardie had a trial with French Top14 club Clermont.

On 26 October 2018, Hardie signed for Newcastle Falcons in the English Premiership Rugby with immediate effect as injury cover for the rest of the 2018–19 season. After impressive performance for Newcastle, Hardie signed a two-year contract extension with the club until the end of the 2020–21 season.

In June 2021 Hardie announced his retirement from professional rugby.

=== International career ===
Hardie made a highly successful international debut for Scotland on 22 August 2015, in a World Cup warm-up game against Italy in Turin. Hardie qualifies for Scotland through his grandmother who was from Low Valleyfield, Culross in Fife. Hardie had never visited Scotland prior to arriving in the UK in build up to the World Cup.

He scored his first international try in the match against Japan at the 2015 World Cup.

=== Personal life ===
In January 2017, it was reported that Hardie had chased down and caught a shoplifter at Edinburgh's Ocean Terminal shopping centre.

In October 2017, it was reported that Hardie had been suspended by Edinburgh Rugby for alleged cocaine use. As result in November 2017, he was suspended for three months by Scottish Rugby for "Gross Misconduct".
