= Invercargill Licensing Trust =

Licensing trust in Invercargill, New Zealand

- Industry: Retail, hospitality
- Headquarters: New Zealand
- Area served: Invercargill
- Products: Liquor stores
- Website: ilt.co.nz

The Invercargill Licensing Trust (ILT) is a licensing trust in the city of Invercargill in New Zealand. It has a monopoly on the development of premises licensed for the sale of alcoholic beverages, and associated accommodation in the city, and uses the profits from these to fund school, sports and cultural groups, and welfare bodies.

== History ==
The concept of licensing trusts in New Zealand was first introduced by the Invercargill Licensing Trust Act 1944, and was developed by the recommendations of the Report of the Royal Commission on Licensing 1946. It was not originally directly elected, with three members being appointed by the New Zealand Government, two members being appointed by the Invercargill City Council, and one member appointed by the South Invercargill Borough Council.

== Board ==
This is the current ILT board. The most recent election was in 2025.

Members	Position	Term
Paddy O'Brien	President	2016–present
Suzanne Prentice	Deputy President	2004–2010; 2013–present
Angela Newell	Trustee	2010–present
Graham Hawkes	Trustee	2022–present
Sharee Carey	Trustee	2022–present
Nick Jeffrey	Trustee	2025–present

== Donations and grants ==
In 2024, the ILT provided donations and grants totalling around $8 million to a wide range of organisations. A further $12.8 million in donations and grants was made by the ILT Foundation, which owns and operates all the gaming machines in ILT establishments.

== Books on the ILT ==
- History of the Invercargill Licensing Trust (Invercargill, 1955)
- Clive Lind, Pubs, Pints and People: 50 Years of the Invercargill Licensing Trust, 1994 Invercargill
