= Jamie Mackintosh =

NZ international rugby union player

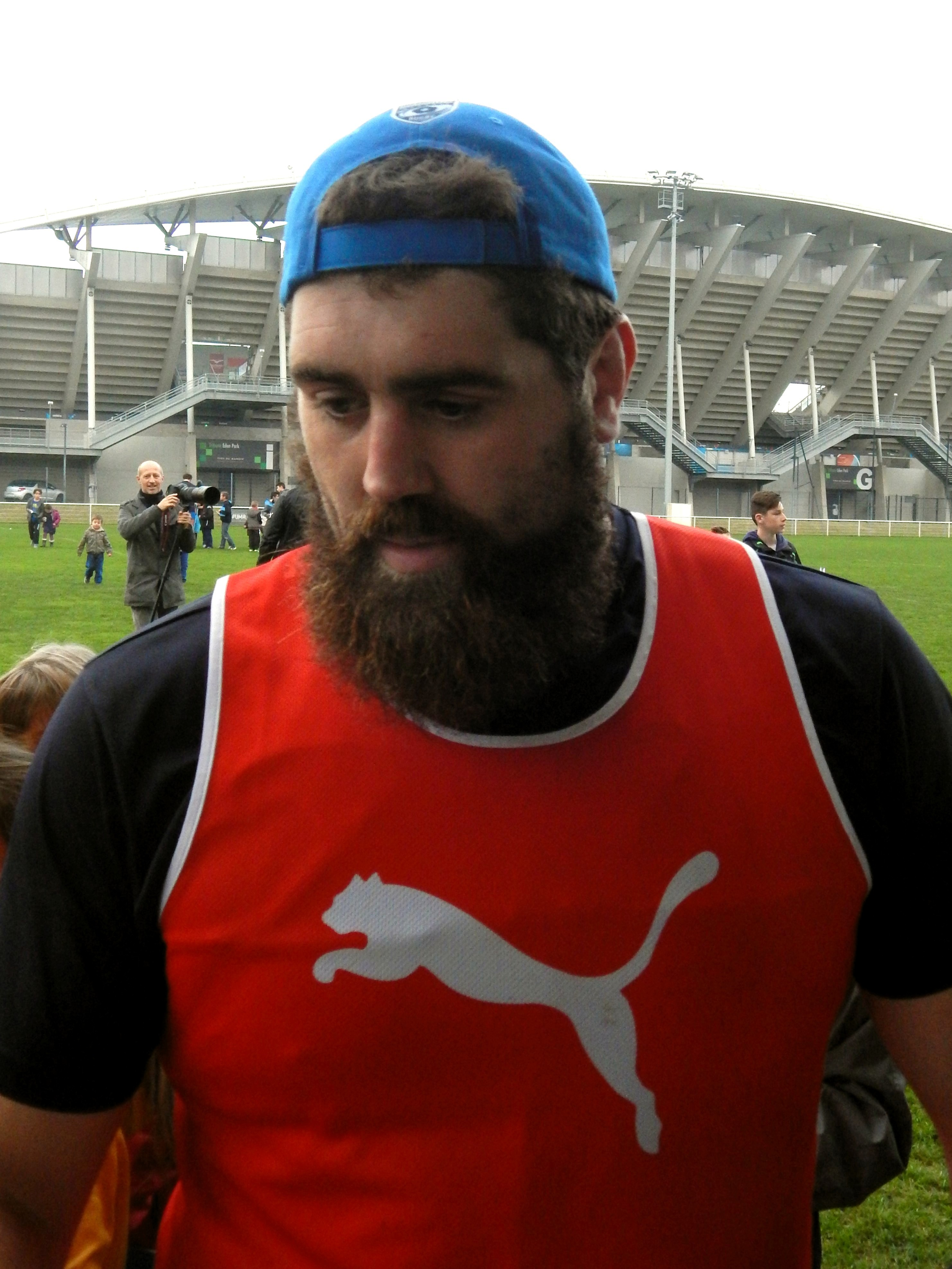
- Born: Jamie Lachlan Mackintosh; 20 February 1985 (age 41) Invercargill, New Zealand
- Height: 1.93 m (6 ft 4 in)
- Weight: 130 kg (20 st 7 lb; 287 lb)
- School: Southland Boys' High School

Rugby union career
- Position: Prop
Senior career
Years	Team	Apps	(Points)
2015–2016	Montpellier	4	(5)
2016	Ohio Aviators	12	(25)
2016–19	Pau	66	(10)
2020–2021	Austin Gilgronis	18	(20)
- Correct as of 6 August 2021
Provincial / State sides
Years	Team	Apps	(Points)
2004–2015	Southland	110	(55)
2020	Otago	7	(0)
- Correct as of 6 August 2021
Super Rugby
Years	Team	Apps	(Points)
2007–2013	Highlanders	67	(10)
2014–2015	Chiefs	22	(5)
- Correct as of 6 August 2021
International career
Years	Team	Apps	(Points)
2005–2006	New Zealand Colts	9	(10)
2008–2009	New Zealand	2	(0)
2015–2018	Barbarian F.C.	2	(0)
- Correct as of 6 August 2021
Coaching career
- Years: Team
- 2020–2022: Otago (Assistant)
- 2022–: Hurricanes (Assistant)
- Correct as of 20 Feb 2026

Jamie Mackintosh (born 20 February 1985) is a New Zealand former professional rugby union player currently an assistant coach for the Hurricanes (rugby union) in Super Rugby.

He previously played for Section Paloise in the French Top 14 competition. He was also selected for the All Blacks 2008 End of year tour to travel to Hong Kong and Britain. Mackintosh grew up in Fortification, 50 minutes south east of Invercargill and played for the Tokanui Rugby Club's junior sides. He attended Waimahaka Primary School and went onto Southland Boys' High School.

== Domestic career ==
=== Southland ===
Jamie Mackintosh played his first match for Southland in 2004 when he came off the bench against Waikato. He played in eight games in the NPC that year, starting in two of them. In 2006, Mackintosh started in all eight of the games he played. For the 2007 season, he went two better, and played in ten matches, starting in all of them, and enjoyed wins over Otago, Bay of Plenty and Manawatu. Mackintosh was a long-standing fixture for the Southland Stags, up until his surprising omission from the 2016 squad. Having earned 123 caps for the team, the peak of his accomplishments was helping bring the Ranfurly Shield back to Southland in 2009, breaking a drought of 50 years in doing so. Mackintosh was also a member of the 2011 team that re-captured the shield for a second time in the team's modern history.

=== Super Rugby ===
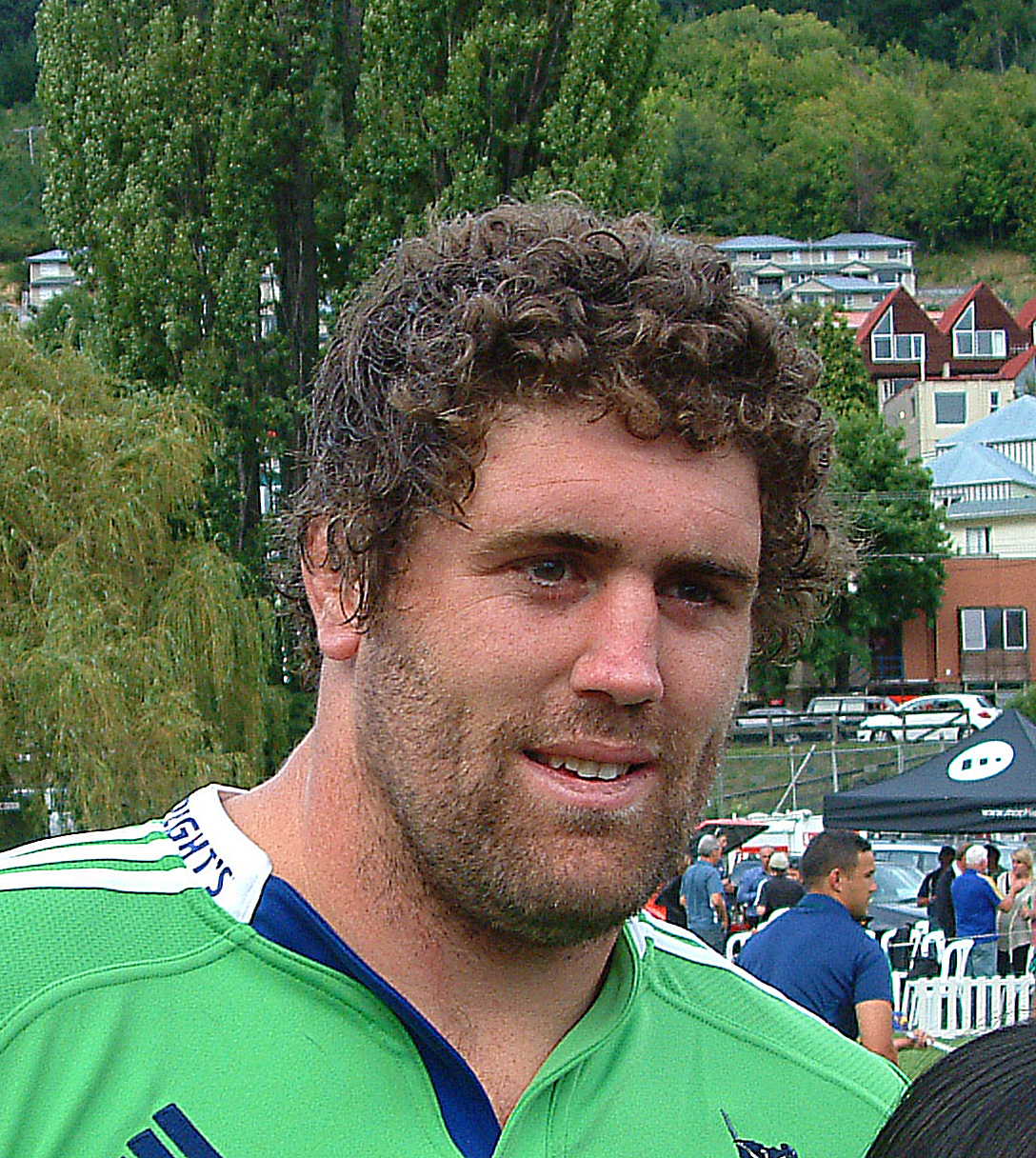
Jamie Mackintosh (Highlanders), 2013.

In 2007, Mackintosh was called into the Highlanders squad, where he played in three matches, all of them off the bench. In 2008, Mackintosh played in eleven Highlanders matches. He also scored two tries and received two yellow cards. He remained with the Highlanders until 2013, captaining the team for the 2010 and 2011 seasons. He joined the Chiefs for the 2014 Super Rugby season, with whom he played until 2015.

=== Top 14 ===
During the autumn 2015, Mackintosh joined the Top 14 side Montpellier. In 2016, Mackintosh returned to the Top 14 competition with Section Paloise.

=== PRO Rugby ===
In March 2016, Mackintosh joined the American newly formed PRO Rugby competition with the Ohio Aviators. He played in the competition's only season before returning to France.

== International career ==
On Sunday, 26 October 2008, after a successful year with Southland making the semi-finals of the Air New Zealand Cup for the first time, he was named in the All Blacks squad to tour Europe in November of that year. He started in two matches for the All Blacks, the 32–6 victory in the test against Scotland and a full 80 minutes in the hard-fought 18–16 win against Munster. He did not appear again for the New Zealand team.

== Coaching career ==
Mackintosh has served as an assistant coach for the Hurricanes since 2022, having previously spent two seasons as the forwards coach and scrum coach for Otago.
