= Southland Boys' High School =

Location
- 181 Herbert Street, Invercargill, New Zealand; 46.3959°S 168.3586°E

Information
- Type: State Single Sex Boys Secondary (Year 7–13) with Boarding Facilities
- Motto: Latin: Non Scholae Sed Vitae Discimus (Not for school but for life we are learning)
- Established: 1881; 145 years ago
- Ministry of Education Institution no.: 404
- Rector: Ray Laurenson
- Enrolment: 1,087 (July 2026)
- Website: sbhs.school.nz

Southland Boys' High School (SBHS) is an all-boys school in Invercargill, New Zealand, and has been the only one in the city since Marist Brothers was merged with St Catherines to form Verdon College in 1982.

== History ==
SBHS was founded in 1881, and in 1926, the original brick building was opened on the present Herbert St site. This building is called the Pearce Block in memory of Mr T. Pearce who was rector from around 1904 to 1929. Subsequent buildings were named after George Uttley, Malcolm Leadbetter, Don Grant and Laurie Cornwell. The gymnasium was named after Jim Page.

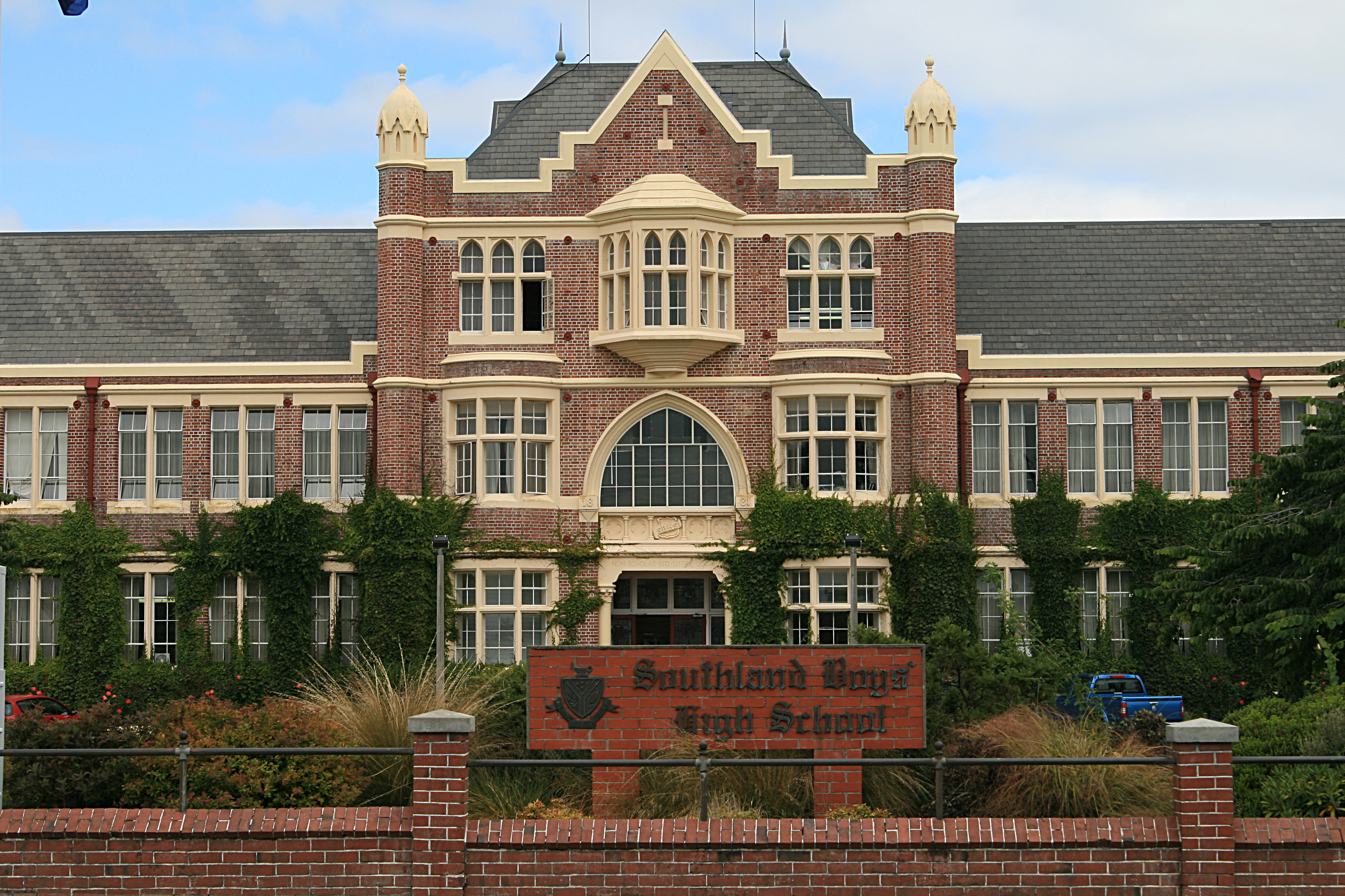
Southland Boys High School

The west end of the Pearce Block suffered a fire during Easter 1980 which was well recorded in the 1980 year book "The Southlandian". The fire extensively damaged three class rooms on the upper floor whilst the Rector's, DP's and Senior Master's offices on the ground floor were water damaged (in the right hand side of the photo).

The school co-hosted the 2006 State Twenty20 Cricket Knock-Out Tournament in Invercargill.

In 2023 the Southland Boys' High School First XV rugby team won the Top Four trophy for the first time, beating Westlake Boys' High School to be crowned national champions and to also gain the Moascar Cup. Coach Gerald Dermody said he had never dreamt such a win would be possible and former All Black Leicester Rutledge commented: "When an old fella at 71 starts crying and tears rolling out of my eyes, that is how I felt." The Mayor of Invercargill, Nobby Clark said it would be appropriate for there to be a ticker-tape parade in the main street in recognition of the achievement, and the principal of the school acknowledged the "strong team ethic around the group...[and that]...they showed massive heart and got across the line." Although a planned parade was cancelled due to the prospect of bad weather, the team was officially welcomed in the council chambers. A congratulatory message was read from the mayor of Kumagaya, Invercargill’s Japanese sister city and Nobby Clark said there were likely to be opportunities for the team to play in Japan and for individual players to study there in the future.

== Notable alumni ==
Well-known former students include Jeremy Waldron, who attended the school until 1970 and is now a prominent legal and political philosopher in the United States, and Andrew White, who played rugby for the All Blacks in the 1920s. In the early 1980s there were several rows of framed photos in the downstairs corridor of the Grant Block of Old Boys who had gone on to represent New Zealand at rugby or cricket. One student, Brian McKechnie, is the only Double All Black to date. He played 26 Tests for the All Blacks between 1977–1981 at Full Back and First Five-Eighth and also represented The New Zealand Black Caps in Cricket between 1975–1981. The Leadbetter Wing also had framed photos of the First 15 rugby team dating back to around 1913. Other notable All Blacks are 100 test veteran Malili (Mils) Muliaina, former captain Paul Henderson, props Jamie Mackintosh, and Clarke Dermody. The school also has a proud tradition in providing New Zealand schoolboys Rugby representatives. Recent names include Robbie Robinson, John Hardie and Scott Eade. Gordon Hunter played two games for the Otago rugby team, coached them from 1992–1995 in the National Provincial Championship and was the first coach of the Highlanders in 1996. Between 1996–1999 he served as an assistant coach and selector for the All Blacks, moving to Auckland to coach The Blues in 2000. Hunter retired soon after that due to ill health, dying in 2002 from cancer.

Jacob Duffy, A fast bowler who represents the Black Caps in cricket also studied here.

Outside sport, George Mason has made a name for himself in television with recurring roles in hit programs such as Shortland Street, Go Girls, and most recently Home and Away (Australian soap). Also in the arts scene, New Zealand cartoonist Shaun Yeo began his career supplying cartoons and illustrations to The Southland Times while still a student at the school.

Dave Cull, a former Mayor of Dunedin, who attended the school from 1963 to 1967, died on 27 April 2021.

Jack Taylor (rugby union, born 2003)

== Notable staff ==
- Steve Broad – X Factor contestant
- Gren Alabaster
- Jack Alabaster

== Houses ==
There are five houses at Southland Boys' High School, four of which are named after past Rectors of the school, with Coldstream House being the exception. The Houses compete in Sports Days, Cultural Competitions, Swimming Competitions, Drama Productions, Fundraising Events among other activities.

- Coldstream House is represented by the colour Orange.
- Deaker House is represented by the colour Red.
- Grant House is represented by the colour Green.
- Uttley House is represented by the colour Blue.
- Pearce House is represented by the colour Silver.

== Rectors ==
Rectors of the school are as follows:

- Mr G W Blanchflower (1881–1885)
- Mr A H Highton (1886–1893)
- Mr H L Fowler (1893–1903)
- Mr T D Pearce (1904–1929)
- Dr George Uttley (1930–1946)
- Mr Malcolm Leadbetter (1947–1950)
- Mr Don Grant (1950–1963)
- Mr Laurie Cornwell (1963–1981)
- Mr Jack Alabaster (1981–1988)
- Mr Rowly Currie (1989–1999)
- Mr Ian Baldwin (2000–2017)
- Mr Simon Coe (2017–2024)
- Mr Ray Laurenson (2024–present
