= 1978 New Zealand rugby union tour of Britain and Ireland =

- Manager: Russell Thomas
- Tour captain: Graham Mourie
Summary
P	W	D	L
Total
18	17	0	1
Test match
4	4	0	0
Opponent
P	W	D	L
Ireland
1	1	0	0
Wales
1	1	0	0
England
1	1	0	0
Scotland
1	1	0	0

In 1978 the New Zealand national rugby union team, the All Blacks, toured Britain and Ireland. They were the eighth All Black team to undertake a full tour of the countries and became the first to achieve a Grand Slam by beating the national teams of Ireland, Wales, England and Scotland. The previous seven touring teams had either lost or drawn at least one international, or had not played all four nations.

The New Zealand team played eighteen matches between 18 October and 16 December, winning seventeen games and losing once, to Munster at Thomond Park, Limerick. This was the first time that an All Black team had been beaten in Ireland and it remained the All Blacks' only defeat by any Irish team until they lost to the Ireland national team in 2016. The Munster victory inspired a stage play, Alone it Stands.

Although the All Blacks won their four international matches, three of the games were undecided until close to the end. The match against Ireland was level 6–6 at the end of normal time and was settled by Andy Dalton's try in injury time. Against Wales, a 78th-minute penalty goal by replacement full-back Brian McKechnie turned a 12–10 deficit into a 13–12 win. In the Scotland game the All Blacks led 12–9 going into injury time and a drop goal attempt by Ian McGeechan, which would have tied the scores if successful, was charged down and led to a breakaway try for New Zealand by Bruce Robertson.

== Matches ==
Scores and results list New Zealand's points tally first.

Opposing Team	For	Against	Date	Venue	Status
Cambridge University	32	12	18 October 1978	Grange Road, Cambridge	Tour match
Cardiff	17	7	21 October 1978	Cardiff Arms Park, Cardiff	Tour match
West Wales XV	23	7	25 October 1978	St Helen's, Swansea	Tour match
London Counties	37	12	28 October 1978	Twickenham, London	Tour match
Munster	0	12	31 October 1978	Thomond Park, Limerick	Tour match
IRELAND	10	6	4 November 1978	Lansdowne Road, Dublin	Test match
Ulster	23	7	7 November 1978	Ravenhill, Belfast	Tour match
WALES	13	12	11 November 1978	Cardiff Arms Park, Cardiff	Test match
South and South-West Counties	20	0	15 November 1978	Memorial Ground, Bristol	Tour match
Midland Counties	20	15	18 November 1978	Welford Road, Leicester	Tour match
Combined Services	34	6	21 November 1978	Aldershot Military Stadium, Aldershot	Tour match
ENGLAND	16	6	25 November 1978	Twickenham, London	Test match
Monmouthshire	26	9	29 November 1978	Rodney Parade, Newport	Tour match
North of England	9	6	2 December 1978	Birkenhead Park, Birkenhead	Tour match
North and Midlands	31	3	5 December 1978	Linksfield Stadium, Aberdeen	Tour match
SCOTLAND	18	9	9 December 1978	Murrayfield, Edinburgh	Test match
Bridgend	17	6	13 December 1978	Brewery Field, Bridgend	Tour match
Barbarians	18	16	16 December 1978	Cardiff Arms Park, Cardiff	Tour match

== Test matches ==
=== Ireland ===
4 November 1978

Ireland	6–10	New Zealand
Pen: Ward (2)		Try: Dalton; Drop: Bruce (2)

Lansdowne Road, Dublin
Referee: Clive Norling (WRU)

The All Blacks opened the scoring with a dropped goal by Bruce, with Ward's penalty making the score 3–3 at half-time. Bruce put the visitors ahead again with a further dropped goal before Ward levelled again with another penalty. The score remained at 6–6 as the game went into injury time but an unconverted try by Dalton after Donaldson's break from a line-out gave New Zealand a 10–6 victory. Rothmans Yearbook called it a "tense, if unspectacular, struggle in perfect playing conditions" and asserted that the All Blacks "deserved their narrow victory" after winning 31 of the 40 line-outs in the game.

NEW ZEALAND: Clive Currie, Stu Wilson, Bill Osborne, Mark Taylor, Brian Ford (rep Bryan Williams), Doug Bruce, Mark Donaldson, Bill Bush, Andy Dalton, Brad Johnstone, Andy Haden, Frank Oliver, Graham Mourie (c), Leicester Rutledge, Gary Seear.

IRELAND: Larry Moloney, Terry Kennedy, Mike Gibson, Alistair McKibbin, Freddie McLennan, Tony Ward, Colin Patterson, Ned Byrne, Pa Whelan, Phil Orr, Moss Keane, Donal Spring, Fergus Slattery, Shay Deering (c), Willie Duggan

=== Wales ===
11 November 1978

Wales	12–13	New Zealand
Pen: Davies (3); Fenwick		Try: Wilson; Pen: McKechnie (3)

Cardiff Arms Park, Cardiff
Referee: Roger Quittenton (RFU)

NZ was accused of cheating in this test match by jumping out of the line-out in order to fool the referee into giving them a last-minute penalty kick.

=== England ===
25 November 1978

England	6–16	New Zealand
Pen: Hare; Drop: Hare		Try: Oliver; Johnstone; Con: McKechnie; Pen: McKechnie (2)

Twickenham, London
Referee: Norman Sanson (SRU)

=== Scotland ===
9 December 1978

Scotland	9–18	New Zealand
Try: Hay; Con: Irvine; Drop: McGeechan		Try: Seear; Robertson; Con: McKechnie (2); Pen: McKechnie (2)

Murrayfield, Edinburgh
Referee: John West (IRFU)

== Touring party ==
- Manager: Russell Thomas
- Assistant Manager: Jack Gleeson
- Captain: Graham Mourie
- Physiotherapist: Brian McKenzie

=== Full back ===
Clive Currie, Brian McKechnie, Richard Wilson

=== Three-quarters ===
Stu Wilson, Robert Kururangi, Brian Ford, Bryan Williams, Bruce Robertson, Lyn Jaffray, Mark Taylor, Bill Osborne

=== Half-backs ===
Doug Bruce, Eddie Dunn, Dave Loveridge, Mark Donaldson

=== Forwards ===
Brad Johnstone, John Ashworth, John McEldowney, Gary Knight, Andy Dalton, John Black, Bill Bush, John Fleming, John Loveday, Andy Haden, Frank Oliver, Barry Ashworth, Leicester Rutledge, Graham Mourie, Wayne Graham, Gary Seear, Ash McGregor

== Sources ==
- Vivian Jenkins, ed. (1980). Rothmans Rugby Yearbook 1979–80. Queen Anne Press. ISBN 0354090879.
