= 1979 New Zealand rugby union tour of England, Scotland and Italy =

The 1979 New Zealand rugby union tour of England, Scotland and Italy was a series of eleven matches played by the New Zealand national rugby union team (the All Blacks) in England, Scotland and Italy in October and November 1979. The tour was very successful as the team won ten of the eleven games, including the international matches against Scotland and England. The only team to defeat the All Blacks was the English Northern Division.

== Matches ==
Scores and results list New Zealand's points tally first.

Opposing Team	For	Against	Date	Venue
London Division	21	18	24 October	Twickenham, London
South of Scotland	19	3	27 October	Mansfield Park, Hawick
Edinburgh	16	4	31 October	Myreside, Edinburgh
Midland Division	33	7	3 November	Welford Road, Leicester
Glasgow	12	6	6 November	Hughenden, Glasgow
Scotland	20	6	10 November	Murrayfield, Edinburgh
Anglo-Scots	18	9	14 November	Dundee
Northern Division	9	21	17 November	Cross Green, Otley
South-West and South Division	16	0	20 November	County Ground Stadium, Exeter
England	10	9	24 November	Twickenham, London
Italy	18	12	28 November	Stadio Battaglini, Rovigo

== Test matches ==
=== Scotland ===
10 November 1979

Scotland	6–20	New Zealand
Irvine (6 – 2pg)		(4 – 1t) Loveridge (4 – 1t) Mexted (4 – 1t) S. Wilson (4 – 1t) Dunn (4 – 2c) R. Wilson

Murrayfield, Edinburgh
Referee: Roger Quittenton (England)

SCOTLAND: Andy Irvine, Keith Robertson, Jim Renwick, David Johnston, Bruce Hay, John Rutherford, Alan Lawson, Iain Milne, Colin Deans, Ian McLauchlan (c), Alan Tomes, David Gray, Gordon Dickson, Ian Lambie, Mike Biggar

NEW ZEALAND: Richard Wilson, Stu Wilson, Gary Cunningham, Murray Taylor, Bernie Fraser, Eddie Dunn, Dave Loveridge, Brad Johnstone, Andy Dalton, John Spiers, Andy Haden, John Fleming, Ken Stewart, Murray Mexted, Graham Mourie (c).

=== England ===
24 November 1979

England	9–10	New Zealand
Hare (9 – 3pg)		(6 – 2pg) R. Wilson (4 – 1t) Fleming

Twickenham, London
Referee: Norman Sanson (Scotland)

ENGLAND: Dusty Hare, John Carleton, Tony Bond, Nick Preston, Mike Slemen, Les Cusworth, Steve Smith, Fran Cotton, Peter Wheeler, Colin Smart, Bill Beaumont (c), Maurice Colclough, Tony Neary, John Scott, Mike Rafter

NEW ZEALAND: Richard Wilson, Brian Ford, Stu Wilson, Gary Cunningham, Bernie Fraser, Murray Taylor, Dave Loveridge, Brad Johnstone, Peter Sloane, John Spiers, Andy Haden, John Fleming, Ken Stewart, Murray Mexted, Graham Mourie (c).

== Touring party ==
- Manager: Russell Thomas
- Assistant Manager: Eric Watson
- Captain: Graham Mourie
- Physiotherapist: Brian McKenzie

=== Full back ===
- Richard Wilson (Canterbury)
- Allan Hewson (Wellington)

=== Three-quarters ===
- Stu Wilson (Wellington)
- Brian Ford (Marlborough)
- Bernie Fraser (Wellington)
- Gary Cunningham (Auckland)
- Tim Twigden (Auckland)
- Kieran Keane (Canterbury)

=== Half-backs ===
- Eddie Dunn (North Auckland)
- Murray Taylor (Waikato)
- Mark Donaldson (Manawatu)
- Dave Loveridge (Taranaki)

=== Forwards ===
- Murray Mexted (Wellington)
- Graham Mourie (Taranaki)
- Ken Stewart (Southland)
- Mike Burgoyne (North Auckland)
- Vance Stewart (Canterbury)
- Andy Haden (Auckland)
- John Fleming (Wellington)
- Brad Johnstone (Auckland)
- Rod Ketels (Counties)
- Barry Thompson (Canterbury)
- John Spiers (Counties)
- Andy Dalton (Counties)
- Peter Sloane (North Auckland)
