= 1977 British Lions tour to New Zealand =

- Date: 18 May – 16 August
- Coach: (Wales) John Dawes
- Tour captain: (Wales) Phil Bennett
- Test series winners: New Zealand (3–1)
- Top test point scorer: (Wales) Phil Bennett (18)
Summary
P	W	D	L
Total
26	21	0	5
Test match
4	1	0	3
Opponent
P	W	D	L
New Zealand
4	1	0	3

Tour chronology
- ← South Africa 1974 South Africa 1980 →

In 1977, the British Lions rugby union team toured New Zealand. The Lions played 26 matches, including four internationals against the All Blacks. They lost the series against the All Blacks by three matches to one. The team played as the British Isles in their internationals against the All Blacks and the British Lions for the non-international games. Unlike all previous tours to New Zealand, the Lions did not play any matches in Australia, though one game was also played at Buckhurst Park, Suva, against Fiji.

The Lions tourists left London on 10 May 1977 and returned on 19 August. Of their 26 matches on tour, they won 21 and lost 5. Although the Lions lost the test series against the All Blacks they were level 1–1 after the second international and came close to drawing the series; they led 9–6 going into injury time in the fourth test only to concede a match-winning try scored by Lawrie Knight.

Outside the test series, the Lions beat all their New Zealand provincial opponents as well as the NZ Maori and NZ Juniors representative teams, losing only to the New Zealand Universities team four days before the first international – this was the first defeat for a Lions team since the 1971 tourists lost the second test to the All Blacks on the same Christchurch ground and ended an unbeaten run of thirty-nine matches for the Lions. It was during the Junior All Blacks game that the famous 'Mudman' image of Fran Cotton, waiting for the ball at a line-out while caked head-to-toe in mud, was taken. Captured by Colorsport's Colin Elsey, it became one of the iconic images of rugby union.

On their way home, in August 1977, the Lions stopped off to play Fiji for the first time and suffered their fifth defeat of the tour, Fiji winning 25–21.

A team selected from the Lions touring party played one further match, against the Barbarians at Twickenham on 10 September 1977, to mark the Silver Jubilee of Queen Elizabeth II. The Lions won by 23–14 in front of a capacity crowd, having led 15–0 at half-time.

== Squad ==
The touring party as originally announced contained 17 players from Wales (including the as-yet uncapped Elgan Rees and Brynmor Williams), 5 from England, 5 from Scotland and 3 from Ireland. Geoff Wheel had to withdraw on medical advice before the touring party left and was replaced by Moss Keane. Roger Uttley aggravated a back injury at the get-together prior to leaving and was subsequently replaced by Jeff Squire. Bill Beaumont, Charlie Faulkner and Alun Lewis joined the tour party later in New Zealand as replacements – Lewis never played international rugby for Wales.

Several senior players made themselves unavailable to tour.

=== Management ===
- Manager George Burrell (Scotland)
- Coach John Dawes (Wales)

=== Backs ===
- Phil Bennett (Llanelli and Wales) Captain
- John D Bevan (Aberavon and Wales)
- David Burcher (Newport and Wales)
- Gareth Evans (Newport and Wales)
- Steve Fenwick (Bridgend and Wales)
- Mike Gibson (North of Ireland FC and Ireland)
- Bruce Hay (Boroughmuir and Scotland)
- Andy Irvine (Heriot's FP and Scotland)
- Alun Lewis (Cambridge University and London Welsh) ^{[1]}
- Ian McGeechan (Headingley and Scotland)
- Dougie Morgan (Stewart's Melville FP and Scotland)
- Elgan Rees (Neath) ^{[1]}
- Peter Squires (Harrogate and England)
- Brynmor Williams (Cardiff) ^{[1]}
- J.J. Williams (Llanelli and Wales)

=== Forwards ===
- Bill Beaumont (Fylde and England)
- Gordon Brown (West of Scotland and Scotland)
- Terry Cobner (Pontypool and Wales)
- Fran Cotton (Sale and England)
- Willie Duggan (Blackrock College and Ireland)
- Trefor Evans (Swansea and Wales)
- Charlie Faulkner (Pontypool and Wales)
- Nigel Horton (Moseley and England)
- Moss Keane (Lansdowne and Ireland)
- Allan Martin (Aberavon and Wales)
- Tony Neary (Broughton Park and England)
- Philip Orr (Old Wesley and Ireland)
- Graham Price (Pontypool and Wales)
- Derek Quinnell (Llanelli and Wales)
- Jeff Squire (Newport and Wales)
- Peter Wheeler (Leicester and England)
- Clive Williams (Aberavon and Wales)
- Bobby Windsor (Pontypool and Wales)

^{1} Elgan Rees, Brynmor Williams and Alun Lewis were uncapped at the time of the 1977 tour; Rees and Williams were subsequently capped by Wales.

== Results ==
Date	Opponent	Location	Result	Score
18 May	Wairarapa Bush	Memorial Park, Masterton	Won	41–13
21 May	Hawke's Bay	McLean Park, Napier	Won	13–11
25 May	Poverty Bay / East Coast	Rugby Park, Gisborne	Won	25–6
28 May	Taranaki	Westown Park, New Plymouth	Won	21–13
1 June	King Country / Wanganui	Taumarunui Domain, Taumarunui	Won	60–9
4 June	Manawatu / Horowhenua	Showgrounds Oval, Palmerston North	Won	18–12
8 June	Otago	Carisbrook, Dunedin	Won	12–7
11 June	Southland	Rugby Park, Invercargill	Won	20–12
14 June	New Zealand Universities	Lancaster Park, Christchurch	Lost	9–21
18 June	New Zealand	Athletic Park, Wellington	Lost	12–16
22 June	Hanan Shield Districts	Fraser Park, Timaru	Won	45–6
25 June	Canterbury	Lancaster Park, Christchurch	Won	14–13
29 June	West Coast-Buller	Westport	Won	45–0
2 July	Wellington	Athletic Park, Wellington	Won	13–6
5 July	Marlborough / Nelson Bays	Lansdowne Park, Blenheim	Won	40–23
9 July	New Zealand	Lancaster Park, Christchurch	Won	13–9
13 July	New Zealand Maoris	Eden Park, Auckland	Won	22–19
16 July	Waikato	Rugby Park, Hamilton	Won	18–13
20 July	New Zealand Juniors	Athletic Park, Wellington	Won	19–9
23 July	Auckland	Eden Park, Auckland	Won	34–15
30 July	New Zealand	Carisbrook, Dunedin	Lost	7–19
3 August	Counties / Thames Valley	Pukekohe Stadium, Pukekohe	Won	35–10
6 August	North Auckland	Okara Park, Whangārei	Won	18–7
9 August	Bay of Plenty	Rotorua	Won	23–16
13 August	New Zealand	Eden Park, Auckland	Lost	9–10
16 August	Fiji	Buckhurst Park, Suva	Lost	21–25

== Test matches ==
=== First Test ===
18 June 1977

New Zealand	16–12	British Isles
Try: Going; Johnstone; Batty; Con: Williams (2)	Report	Pen: Bennett (3); Irvine

Athletic Park, Wellington
Attendance: 43,000
Referee: P. McDavitt (New Zealand)

New Zealand: Colin Farrell, Bryan Williams, Bruce Robertson, Bill Osborne, Grant Batty, Duncan Robertson, Sid Going, Brad Johnstone, Tane Norton (c), Kent Lambert, Andy Haden, Frank Oliver, Kevin Eveleigh, Ian Kirkpatrick, Lawrie Knight

British Lions: Irvine, Squires, Fenwick, McGeechan, J. J. Williams, Bennett (c), B. Williams, Orr, Windsor, Price, Martin, Keane, Cobner, T. Evans, Duggan

=== Second Test ===
9 July 1977

New Zealand	9–13	British Isles
Pen: Williams (3)	Report	Try: J. J. Williams; Pen: Bennett (3)

Lancaster Park, Christchurch
Attendance: 50,000
Referee: B. Duffy (New Zealand)

New Zealand: Colin Farrell, Bryan Williams, Bill Osborne, Lyn Jaffray, Mark Taylor, Doug Bruce, Sid Going, Brad Johnstone, Tane Norton (c), Billy Bush, Andy Haden, Frank Oliver, Kevin Eveleigh, Ian Kirkpatrick, Lawrie Knight

British Lions: Irvine, J. J. Williams, Fenwick, McGeechan, G. Evans, Bennett (c), B. Williams, Cotton, Wheeler, Price, Beaumont, Brown, Cobner, Quinnell, Duggan

=== Third Test ===
30 July 1977

New Zealand	19–7	British Isles
Try: Kirkpatrick; Haden; Con: Wilson; Pen: Wilson (2); Drop: Robertson	Report	Try:Duggan; Pen: Irvine

Carisbrook, Dunedin
Attendance: 34,000
Referee: D. Millar (New Zealand)

New Zealand: Bevan Wilson, Bryan Williams, Bruce Robertson, Bill Osborne, Brian Ford, Doug Bruce, Lyn Davis, John McEldowney, Tane Norton (c), Billy Bush, Andy Haden, Frank Oliver, Graham Mourie, Ian Kirkpatrick, Lawrie Knight

British Lions: Irvine, J. J. Williams (rep McGeechan), Burcher, Fenwick, G. Evans, Bennett (c), B. Williams (rep Morgan), Cotton, Wheeler, Price, Beaumont, Brown, Cobner, Quinnell, Duggan

=== Fourth Test ===
13 August 1977

New Zealand	10–9	British Isles
Try: Knight; Pen: Wilson (2)	Report	Try: Morgan; Con: Morgan; Pen: Morgan

Eden Park, Auckland
Attendance: 58,000
Referee: D. Millar (New Zealand)

New Zealand: Bevan Wilson, Bryan Williams, Bruce Robertson, Bill Osborne, Brian Ford (rep Mark Taylor), Doug Bruce, Lyn Davis, John McEldowney (rep Billy Bush), Tane Norton (c), Kent Lambert, Andy Haden, Frank Oliver, Graham Mourie, Ian Kirkpatrick, Lawrie Knight

British Lions: Irvine, Rees, Fenwick, McGeechan, G. Evans, Bennett (c), Morgan, Cotton, Wheeler, Price, Beaumont, Brown, Neary, Squire, Duggan

=== vs Fiji ===
16 August 1977

Fiji	25–21	British Isles
Try: Narisia (2); Rauto; Kaunikoro; Racika; Con: Rauto; Drop: Tikoisuva		Try: Bennett; Beaumont; Burcher; Con: Bennett (3); Pen: Bennett

Buckhurst Park, Suva
Attendance: 20,000
Referee: S. Koroi (Fiji)

Fiji: Kemueli Musunamasi, Joape Kaunikoro, Senitiki Nasave, Qele Ratu, Wame Gavidi, Pio Bosco Tikoisuva (c), Samisoni Viriviri, Josefa Rauto, Atonio Racika, Nimilote Ratudina, Ilaitia Tuisese, Ilisoni Taoba, Rupeni Qaraniqio, Vuata Narisia, Viliame Ratudradra

British Lions: Irvine, G. Evans, McGeechan, Burcher, Bennett (c), Bevan, Lewis, Faulkner, Windsor, Price, Beaumont, Martin, Neary, T. Evans (rep Brown), Squire

== Tour matches ==
18 May 1977	Wairarapa Bush	13–41	Lions	Masterton
	Try: McGlashan, Paton; Con: Kjestrup; Pen: Kjestrup		Try: Squires, J. J. Williams (3), Burcher (2), Cobner (2); Con: Bennett (3); Pen: Bennett	Referee: A. Taylor

21 May 1977	Hawke's Bay	11–13	Lions	McLean Park, Napier
	Try: Stuart, Taylor; Pen: Tocker		Try: Irvine; Pen: Fenwick (3)	Referee: W. Adlam

25 May 1977	Poverty Bay-East Coast	6–25	Lions	Gisborne
	Pen: W. Isaac (2)		Try: McGeechan (2), G. Evans; Con: Morgan (2); Pen: Morgan (3)	Referee: M. Farnworth

28 May 1977	Taranaki	13–21	Lions	New Plymouth
	Try: O'Sullivan; Pen: Martin; Drop: Martin (2)		Try: Irvine, J. J. Williams; Con: Irvine, Bennett; Pen: Irvine (2), Bennett	Referee: P. McDavitt

1 June 1977	King Country-Whanganui	9–60	Lions	Taumarunui
	Try: Snowden; Con: Hill; Pen: Hill		Try: Irvine (5), J. J. Williams (2), Bennett, Quinnell, Squire, B. Williams; Con: Bennett (8)	Referee: J. Walker

4 June 1977	Manawatu-Horowhenua	12–18	Lions	Palmerston North
	Pen: Rollerson (3); Drop: Morris		Try: B. Williams, Fenwick, Hay, C. Williams; Con: Fenwick	Referee: Tom Doocey

== Bibliography ==
- Thomas, Clem; Thomas, Greg (2005). The History of The British and Irish Lions. Mainstream Books. pp. 175–183. ISBN 1-84596-030-0.
- Hopkins, John (1977). Life with the Lions – The Inside Story of the 1977 New Zealand Tour. Stanley Paul & Co Ltd. ISBN 0-09-131740-1.
- Jenkins, Vivian (ed.). Rothmans Rugby Yearbook 1978–79. Macdonald and Jane's. pp. 18–31. ISBN 0-354-09047-X.
