= 1979 Argentina rugby union tour of New Zealand =

- Tour captain: Hugo Porta
Summary
P	W	D	L
Total
9	6	0	3
Test match
2	0	0	2
Opponent
P	W	D	L
New Zealand
2	0	0	2

The 1979 Argentina rugby union tour of New Zealand was a series of nine matches played by the Argentina national rugby union team in August and September 1979.

== Matches ==
22 August 1979

Poverty Bay	3 - 26	Argentina XV
Pen: Whittle		Try: Madero, A.Iachetti; Sansot, Travaglini; Con: Porta 2 Pen: Porta 2

Rugby Park, Gisborne
Referee: W.L..Adlam (Wanganui)

Poverty Bay: G.Muir, G.Bárbara, L.Bárbara, W.Isaac, K.McPherson; J.Whittle, P.Duncan; S.Spence, P.Tocker, Newlands; T.Arthur, W.Muir; W.McFarlane, G.Allen, R.Newlands
Argentina: M.Sansot; P.Campo, M.Loffreda, R.Madero, A.Cappelletti; H.Porta (capt.), A.Soares Gache; H.Silva, T.Petersen, G.Travaglini; A.Iachetti, M.Iachetti; H.Nicola, J.Pérez Coba, E.Rodríguez

25 August 1979

Auckland	13 - 18	Argentina XV
Try: G.Cunningham; Pen: M.Richards, R.Dunn; Drop: de M.Richard		Try: Petersen, Madero; Con: Sansot 2 Pen: Sansot 2

Eden Park, Auckland
Referee: G.Duffy (Taranaki)

Auckland: C.Farrell; B.Williams, G.Cunningham, T.Twigden, M.Mills; P.Richards, R.Dunn, S.Vaout'ua, K.Ramsay, M.Trapp; A.Haden, J.Allen; E.Johnstone (capt.), K.Boyle, L.Toki.
Argentina M.Sansot; M.Campo, M .Loffreda, R.Madero, A.Cappelletti; Porta (capt.), A.Soares Gache; H, Silva, T.Petersen, G.Travaglini; A.Iachetti, M.Iachetti; H.Nicola, J.Pérez Coba, E.Rodríguez.

29 August 1979

Manawatu	10 - 21	Argentina XV
Try: A.Tatana, K.Granger; Con: G.Old		Try: Loffreda, Petersen; Con: Porta 2 Pen: Porta 2 Drop: Porta

Showground Oval, Palmerston North
Referee: T.Docey (Canterbury)

Manawatu:A.Innes; M.O'Callaghan, A.Tatana, L.Cameron, K.Granger; J.Carroll, M.Donaldson; S.Fleming, T.Sole, G.Old; M.Rosenbrook, M.Shaw; D.Clare, G.Knight, R.Gaskin.
Argentina R.Muñiz (41' Gauweloose); M.Campo, M.Loffreda R.Madero, A.Cappelletti; H.Porta (capt.), R.Landajo; E.Ure, T.Petersen, R.Lucke; A.Iachetti, G.Travaglini; H.Nicola, J.Pérez Coba, E.Rodríguez.

1 September 1979

Bay of Plenty	12 - 32	Argentina XV
Pen: G.Rowlands 4		Try: Sansot, Cappelletti, Mastai; Con: Porta; Pen: Porta 3 Drop: Porta 3

Rugby Park, Rotorua
Referee: G.Harrison (Wellington)

Bay of Plenty: Rowlands; D.C.Wanoa, K.A. Ngamanu, E.J.Stokes, J.T.Kamizona; L.J.Brake, P.E.Cook; A, M.McNaughton, F.K.Shelford, G.W.Elvin; P.M.Chadwick, C.J.Ross; R.J.Moore, H.Reid, M.Shew.
Argentina M.Sansot (G.D.Cappelletti.); M.Campo, M.Loffreda, R.Madero, J.H.Gauweloose, H.Porta (capt.), R.Landajo; R.Mastei, A.Silva, G.Travaglini; A.Iachetti, M.Iachetti; A.Voltán, A.Cubelli, E.Rodríguez.

4 September 1979

Taranaki	9 - 19	Argentina XV
Pen: S.Davidson 2 Drop: P. Martin		Try: Loffreda, Soares Gache; Con: Porta; Pen: Porta; Drop: Porta, Madero

Rugby Park, New Plymouth
Referee: Farnsworth (Auckland)

Taranaki: Davidson, B.Gould; M.Thomson, M.Watts, P.Wharehoka; P.Martin, D.Loveridge; E.Fleming, G.Mourie (capt.), C.Cooper, I.Eliason, J.Thwaites; B.McEldowney, F.O'Carroll, J.McEldowney.
Argentina E, Sanguinetti; M.Campo, R.Madero, M.Loffreda, A.Cappelletti; H.Porta (capt.), A.Soares Gache; T, Petersen t:.Ure, R.Lucke; A.Iachetti, G.Travaglini; H.Nicola, J, Pérez Cobo, F, Morel.

8 September 1979

New Zealand XV	18 - 9	Argentina
Pen: Wilson 5 Drop: Dunn		Pen: Porta; Drop: Porta 2

Carisbrook, Dunedin
Attendance: 20.000
Referee: G.Harrison (Wellington)

New Zealand XV			Argentina
Richard Wilson	FB	15	FB	Martin Sansot
Bernie Fraser	W	14	W	Adolfo Cappelletti
Gary Cunningham	C	13	C	Marcelo Loffreda
Lachie Cameron	C	12	C	Rafael Madero
Brian Ford	W	11	W	Marcelo Campo
Eddie Dunn	FH	10	FH	Hugo Porta (capt.)
(capt.) Dave Loveridge	SH	9	SH	Alfredo Soares Gache
Murray Mexted	N8	8	N8	Gabriel Travaglini
Wayne Graham	F	7	F	Tomas Petersen
Ken Stewart	F	6	F	Hector Silva
John Fleming	L	5	L	Marcos Iachetti
Vance Stewart	L	4	L	Alejandro Iachetti
John Ashworth	P	3	P	Topo Rodriguez
Peter Sloane	H	2	H	Javier Perez Cobo
Barry Thompson	P	1	P	Hugo Nicola

11 September 1979

South Canterbury	13 - 23	Argentina XV
Try: R.Teahen; Pen: T.Kelly 3		Try: Sansot, Ure, Picardo; Con: Porta; Pen: Porta; Drop: Porta 2

Fraser Park, Timaru
Referee: N.Thomas (Manawatu)

South Canterbury: T. Kelly; N. Richards, R. Heron, G. O'Brien, R. Teahen; L. Jaffray, K. Tarrant; N. Glass, H. King, D. Callan; U. Bell, M. Kerse; J. Cleverley, T. Murphy, M. Lindsay
Argentina M. Sansot; M. Campo, R. Madero, J.P. Picardo, J. Gauweloose, H. Porta (capt.), R. Landajo; E. Ure, T. Petersen, R. Lucke; A. Iachetti, G. Travaglini; W. Voltán, A. Cubelli, F. Morel

15 September 1979

New Zealand XV	15 - 6	Argentina
Try: Cunningham, Loveridge; Con: Wilson 2 Pen: Wilson		Pen: Porta 2

Athletic Park, Wellington
Attendance: .000
Referee: T.F. Doocey (Canterbury)

New Zealand XV			Argentina
Richard Wilson	FB	15	FB	Martin Sansot
Bernie Fraser	W	14	W	Adolfo Cappelletti
Gary Cunningham	C	13	C	Marcelo Loffreda
Kieran Keane	C	12	C	Rafael Madero
Brian Ford	W	11	W	Marcelo Campo
Eddie Dunn	FH	10	FH	Hugo Porta (capt.)
(capt.) Dave Loveridge	SH	9	SH	Alfredo Soares Gache
Murray Mexted	N8	8	N8	Hector Silva
Michael Burgoyne	F	7	F	Tomas Petersen
Ken Stewart	F	6	F	Ernesto Ure
John Fleming	L	5	L	Alejandro Iachetti
Vance Stewart	L	4	L	Gabriel Travaglini
John Ashworth	P	3	P	Hugo Nicola
Peter Sloane	H	2	H	Javier Perez Cobo
Barry Thompson	P	1	P	Topo Rodriguez

18 September 1979

Counties	18 - 11	Argentina XV
Try: G.Taylor, W.Mc Lean; Con: M.Codlin 2 Pen: M.Codlin 2		Try: Landajo, Porta; Drop: Porta

Pukekohe Stadium, Pukekohe
Referee: J.Pring

Counties: B.Lendrum; R.Kururangi, P.Reilly, B.Robertson, G.Taylor, W.McLean, M.Codlin; P.Clotworthy, H.Habraken, A.Dawson, J.Rawiri, G.Spiers; R.Ketels, A.Dalton (capt.), J.Hughes.
Argentina M.Sansot; M.Campo, M.Loffreda, R.Madero, A.Cappelletti, H.Porta (capt.), R.Landajo; E.Use, T.Petersen, G.Travaglini; A.Iachetti, M.Iachetti; A.Voltán, A.Cuballi, E.Rodríguez.

== Sources ==
- Vivian Jenkins, ed. (1979). Rothmans Rugby Yearbook 1979-80. Queen Anne Press. pp. 47–51. ISBN 0-354-09087-9.
- Union Argentina de Rugby (November 1979). "MEMORIA Temporada año 1979" (.pdf) (in Spanish).
