= 1977 New Zealand rugby union tour of Italy and France =

Summary
P	W	D	L
Total
9	8	0	1
Test match
2	1	0	1
Opponent
P	W	D	L
France
2	1	0	1

The 1977 New Zealand rugby union tour of Italy and France was a series of nine matches played by the New Zealand national rugby union team (the All Blacks) in Italy and France in October and November 1977. The All Blacks won eight of their nine games, losing only the first of the two internationals against France.

== Matches ==
Scores and results list New Zealand's points tally first.

Opposing Team	For	Against	Date	Venue
Italy President's XV	17	9	22 October	Padua
French Selection	45	3	26 October	Stade Municipale, Brive
French Selection (South-East)	12	10	29 October	Stade Municipal, Lyon
French Selection (Languedoc)	12	6	1 November	Perpignan
French Selection (South-West)	34	12	5 November	Stade Armandie, Agen
French Selection (South-West)	38	22	8 November	Stade Municipal, Bayonne
FRANCE	13	18	11 November	Stadium Municipal, Toulouse
French Selection	30	3	15 November	Stade Chanzy, Angoulême
FRANCE	15	3	19 November	Parc des Princes, Paris

== Touring party ==
- Manager: Ron Don
- Assistant manager: Jack Gleeson
- Captain: Graham Mourie

=== Backs ===
- Bevan Wilson (Otago)
- Bryan Williams (Auckland)
- Brian Ford (Marlborough)
- Bruce Robertson (Counties)
- Stu Wilson (Wellington)
- Mark Taylor (Bay of Plenty)
- Bill Osborne (Wanganui)
- Brian Hegarty (Wellington) replacement during tour
- Doug Bruce (Canterbury)
- Brian McKechnie (Southland)
- Mark Donaldson (Manawatu)
- Kevin Greene (Waikato)

=== Forwards ===
- Graham Mourie (Taranaki)
- Kevin Eveleigh (Manawatu)
- Lawrie Knight (Poverty Bay)
- Gary Seear (Otago)
- Dick Myers (Waikato)
- Robbie Stuart (Hawke's Bay)
- Frank Oliver (Southland)
- Andy Haden (Auckland)
- Gary Knight (Manawatu)
- Brad Johnstone (Auckland)
- John Ashworth (Canterbury)
- John McEldowney (Taranaki)
- Andy Dalton (Counties)
- John Black (Canterbury)
