= 1976 New Zealand rugby union tour of South America =

1976 New Zealand tour of South America
- Date: OctNov 1976
- Tour captain: Graham Mourie
- Top point scorer: Richard Wilson (80)
- Top try scorer: Scott Cartwright (7)
Summary
P	W	D	L
Total
9	9	0	0
Test match
3	3	0	0
Opponent
P	W	D	L
Uruguay
1	1	0	0
Argentina
2	2	0	0

The 1976 New Zealand rugby union tour of South America was a series of eight matches played by the New Zealand national rugby union team in Uruguay and Argentina in October and November 1976. The tour was entirely successful as the New Zealand team won all nine matches, scoring a total of 321 points with 72 conceded.

New Zealand did not award full international caps for the three international matches against the Uruguay and Argentina national teams. The match played on 29 October was also the first time Argentina played New Zealand in their history.

== Matches ==
=== Summary ===
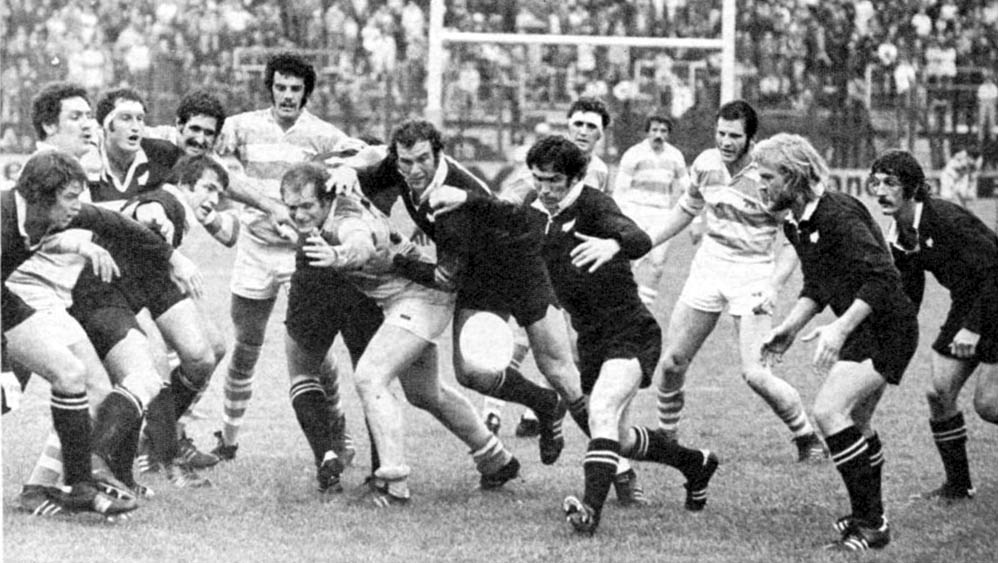
The first test v Argentina

Test matches

#	Date	Rival	City	Venue	Score
1	12 Oct	Uruguay	Montevideo	Centenario Stadium	64–3
2	16 Oct	Buenos Aires RU	Buenos Aires	Ferro C. Oeste Stadium	24-13
3	20 Oct	Seleccionado del Interior (Note: Combined teams of players outside Buenos Aires)	Córdoba	C.A. Belgrano Stadium	30–13
4	23 Oct	C.A. San Isidro	Buenos Aires	Ferro C. Oeste Stadium	37–3
5	27 Oct	Tucumán RU	Tucumán	Atlético Concepción Stadium	51–15
6	30 Oct	Argentina	Buenos Aires	Ferro C. Oeste Stadium	21–9
7	3 Nov	Rosario RU	Rosario	Jockey Club Field	43–4
8	6 Nov	Argentina	Buenos Aires	Ferro C. Oeste Stadium	26–6
9	9 Nov	Cuyo RU	Mendoza	Club Marista Field	25–6

Balance
Pl	W	D	L	PS	PC
9	9	0	0	321	72

=== Match details ===
Complete list of matches played by New Zealand in Uruguay and Argentina:

12 October 1976

Uruguay	3–64	New Zealand
Drop: Iturria		Try: Brake (2), Cartwright (3); Cron, Rollerson, Sapsford; Sloane, Stewart, Stokes; Con: Wilson (4); Pen: Wilson (4)

Centenario, Montevideo
Attendance: 5,000

Team details

Uruguay			New Zealand
Andres Gianoli	FB	15	FB	Richard Wilson
Carlos Widemann	W	14	W	Kenneth Granger
Ignacio Amorin	C	13	C	Eddie Stokes
Jose Maria Ubilla	C	12	C	Doug Rollerson
Michael Smith	W	11	W	Scott Cartwright
Pablo Iturria	FH	10	FH	John Brake
Alberto Cibils	SH	9	SH	Kevin Greene
Jorge Etcheverria	N8	8	N8	Pat Ryan
Juan Bordaberry	F	7	F	Stewart Cron
Jorge Zerbino	F	6	F	Graham Mourie (capt.)
Gerardo Laenz	L	5	L	Vance Stewart
Rafael Zerbino	L	4	L	John Callesen
John Bird	P	3	P	John Spiers
Francisco Obes	H	2	H	Peter Sloane
Jorge Andres Varela	P	1	P	Paul Sapsford
		Replacements
Fernando Praderi	H	16
Jorge Pedro Rignon	P	17
Mario Balinas	L	18
Jose Luis Capezzuto	F	19
Daniel Mutio	SH	20
Alvaro Mastroiani	FH	21
Roberto Canessa	W	22

16 October 1976

Buenos Aires RU	13–24	New Zealand
Try: I. Gutiérrez O'Farrell, Cerioni; Con: Igarzábal; Pen: Igarzábal		Try: Wilson (2), Jaffray, Granger; Con: Rowlands; Pen: Rowlands (2)

Ferro C. Oeste, Buenos Aires
Referee: Florencio Varela (Argentina)

Buenos Aires: S. Gutiérrez O'Farrell; R. Benyon, I. Balfour, 1. Gutierrez O'Farrell, E.Sansot; J. Igarzábal, R. Landajo (capt.); R. Casabal, R. Lucke, M. García Haymes; J. Rodríguez jurado, E, Greene; R. Ventura, E. Vila, A. Cerioni.
New Zealand: G. Rowlands; S. Wilson, E. Stokes, M. Taylor, K. Granger; M. Taylor, I. Stevens; G. Mourie (capt.), S. Conn, M. Jaffray; J. Calleson, A. Haden; J. Me Eldowney, J. Black, P. Sapsford.

20 October 1976

Seleccionado del Interior	13–30	New Zealand
Try: Morgan; Pen: Guarrochena (2), Baetti		Try: Cartwright (2), Ryan; Rollerson, Spiers; Con: Rollerson (2); Pen: Rollerson (2)

Belgrano, Córdoba
Referee: Bruno Bertelli (Argentina)

Interior: R. Muñiz; J. Nogués, O. Terranova R. L'Erario, G. Morgan; D. Guarrochena (Escalante) C. Baetti; B. Minguez, J. Nazzasi (capt.), J. Navesi; R. Pessaglia, J. Mangiamelli; A. Sofredini, J. Crivelli, C. Abud.
New Zealand: R. Wilson; S. Cartwright, S. Wilson, D. Rollerson, K. Granger; J. Brake, I. Stevens; G. Mourie (capt.), S. Conn, P. Ryan; A. Haden, V. Stewart; J. Spiers, P. Sloane, J. Me Eldowney.

23 October 1976

C.A. San Isidro	3–37	New Zealand
Pen: G. Béccar Varela		Try: Rollerson (2), Mark Taylor (2); Mourie, Cartwright; Con: Rowlands (5); Pen: Rowlands

Ferro C. Oeste, Buenos Aires
Referee: Ricardo Colombo (Argentina)

C.A. San Isidro: M. Alonso; D. Beccar Varela, A. Travaglini, G. Beccar Varela, R. Rinaldi; J.Igarzábal, A. Etchegaray (capt.); R. Brinnand, M. García Haymes, A. Urien; L. Varela, G. Allen (A.Casanova); M. Farina, G. Casas, L. Moore.
New Zealand: G. Rowlands; S. Cartwright, S. Wilson, D. Rollerson, Mark Taylor; Murray Taylor, K.Greene; P. Ryan, G. Mourie (capt.), S. Cron; A. Haden, J. Calleson; P. Sapsford, P. Sloane, J. McEldowney.

27 October 1976

Tucumán RU	15–51	New Zealand
Try: Rodríguez; Con: Gamboa; Pen: Gamboa (2); Drop: Acuña		Try: Granger (3), Cartwright (2); Jaffray (2), Stevens; Con: R. Wilson (5); Pen: R. Wilson (3)

Atlético Concepción, Tucumán
Referee: Manuel Peralta (Argentina)

Tucumán: J. Monterrubio; M. Rodríguez, L. Gamboa, C. Imbert, G. Solá; P.Acuña, G. Palou; J. Bach (capt.), J. Posse, F. Veglia; C. Figueroa, J. Yapur; H. Pérez, S. Martoni, C. Bonano. – Replacements: M. Galindo y L. de Chazal
New Zealand: R. Wilson; S. Cartwright, E. Stokes, D. Rollerson, K. Granger; J. Brake, I. Stevens; S. Conn, M. Jaffray, S. Cron; V. Stewart, A. Haden; J. Spiers, J. Black, P. Sapsford

30 October 1976

Argentina	9–21	New Zealand
Pen: G. Béccar Varela (2); Drop: Porta		Try: Wilson, Sloane; Con: Rowlands (2); Pen: Rowlands (3)

Ferro C. Oeste, Buenos Aires
Attendance: 20,000
Referee: Michel Messan (France)

Team details

Argentina	New Zealand

Argentina			New Zealand
Martín Sansot	FB	15	FB	Greg Rowlands
Jorge Gauweloose	W	14	W	Scott Cartwright
Gonzalo Beccar Varela	C	13	C	Stu Wilson
Alejandro Travaglini	C	12	C	Doug Rollerson
Daniel Beccar Varela	W	11	W	Mark Taylor
Hugo Porta	FH	10	FH	Murray Taylor
(capt.) Adolfo Etchegaray	SH	9	SH	Ian Stevens
Ricardo Mastai	F	8	N8	Merv Jaffray
Carlos Neyra	F	7	F	Stewart Cron
Eliseo Branca	L	6	F	Graham Mourie (capt.)
Jorge Carracedo	N8	5	L	Andy Haden
José Javier Fernández	L	4	L	John Callesen
Fernando Insúa	P	3	P	John McEldowney
José Costante	H	2	H	Peter Sloane
Rito Iraneta	P	1	P	Paul Sapsford

3 November 1976

Rosario RU	4–43	New Zealand
Try: Seaton		Try: S. Wilson, Stewart, Sapsford; Haden, Granger, R. Wilson; Con: R. Wilson (5); Pen: R. Wilson (3)

Jockey Club Stadium, Rosario
Referee: José María Cabanas (Argentina)

Rosario RU: Baetti; Romero Acuna, Giner (C. Blanco), Gorina, G. Blanco; Escalante, Castagna; Cúneo, Imhoff (R. Pecce), Macat; Senatore (capt.), Mangiamelli; Pavani, Seaton, Risler.
New Zealand: R. Wilson; K. Granger, Mark Taylor, E. Stokes, S. Wilson; J. Brake, K. Greene; G.Mourie (capt.), S. Conn, P. Ryan; A. Haden, V. Stewart; P. Sapsford, J. Black, J. Spiers.

6 November 1976

Argentina	6–26	New Zealand
Pen: Sansot, Porta		Try: Rollerson, Cron; Murray Taylor, Mark Taylor; Con: Rowlands (2); Pen: Rowlands (2)

Ferro C. Oeste, Buenos Aires
Referee: Michel Messan (France)

Team details

Argentina	New Zealand

Argentina			New Zealand
Martin Sansot	FB	15	FB	Greg Rowlands
Jorge Gauweloose	W	14	W	Scott Cartwright
Gonzalo Beccar Varela	C	13	C	Stu Wilson
Alejandro Travaglini	C	12	C	Doug Rollerson
Daniel Beccar Varela	W	11	W	Mark Taylor
Hugo Porta	FH	10	FH	Murray Taylor
(capt.) Adolfo Etchegaray	SH	9	SH	Ian Stevens
Ricardo Mastai	F	8	N8	Merv Jaffray
Carlos Neyra	F	7	F	Stewart Cron
Eliseo Branca	L	6	F	Graham Mourie (capt.)
Jorge Carracedo	N8	5	L	Andy Haden
José Javier Fernandez	L	4	L	John Callesen
Fernando Insúa	P	3	P	John McEldowney
Jose Costante	H	2	H	Peter Sloane
Rito Iraneta	P	1	P	Paul Sapsford

9 November 1976

Cuyo RU	6–25	New Zealand
Pen: Guarrochena (2)		Try: Black, Wilson; Con: Wilson; Pen: Wilson (4); Drop: Rollerson

Marista R.C. field, Mendoza
Referee: Felipe Ferrari (Argentina)

Cuyo: Muñiz; Massera (Stahrínger), O. Terranova (E. Terranova), Tarquini, Morgan; Guarrochena, Chacón; Navessi, (capitán), Nassazzi, Antonini (Viazzo); Serpa Cattaneo; Irañeta, Crivelli, Michelli.
New Zealand: R. Wilson; S. Cartwright, E. Stokes, D. Rollerson, K. Granger; K. Greene, J. Brake S.Cron, G Mourie (capitán), P. Ryan; A. Haden, V. Stewart; J. Spiers, J. Black, J. Mc Elowney.

== Bibliography ==
- Vivian Jenkins, ed. (1977). Rothmans Rugby Yearbook 1977–78. Queen Anne Press. pp. 40–42. ISBN 0-354-09020-8.
