= Mark Taylor (rugby union, born 1951) =

- Born: Norman Mark Taylor; 11 January 1951 (age 75) Auckland, New Zealand
- Height: 1.78 m (5 ft 10 in)
- Weight: 79 kg (174 lb)
- School: Dargaville High School

Rugby union career
- Position(s): Second five-eighth, wing
Amateur team(s)
Years	Team	Apps	(Points)
1979–1982	Wasps RFC		
Provincial / State sides
Years	Team	Apps	(Points)
1973–1978	Bay of Plenty	64	
1982	Hawke's Bay	8	
International career
Years	Team	Apps	(Points)
1976–1982	New Zealand	9	(4)

Norman Mark Taylor (born 11 January 1951) is a former New Zealand rugby union player. A second five-eighth and wing, Taylor represented Bay of Plenty and Hawke's Bay at a provincial level, and was a member of the New Zealand national side, the All Blacks, between 1976 and 1982.

== Rugby career ==
Taylor went on the All Black Argentina tour of 1976 and although he played both matches against Argentina on the left wing New Zealand did not award full international caps for them. He then made his test debut at left wing in the second test of the 1977 Lions tour at Lancaster Park, Christchurch. He was called into the team to replace Grant Batty who retired from rugby due to his ongoing knee injury. Batty had played in the first test and scored a famous intercept try against the Lions. New Zealand lost the second test match by 9-13 and Taylor was then dropped in favour of Brian Ford for the third test. However Taylor did come on as an injury replacement during the 4th test when Ford gashed his knee.

In the first test of the 1977 tour to France which New Zealand lost 13–18, Taylor played second five-eighth with Stu Wilson coming into the team on the left wing. In the second test, in which New Zealand equalised the series with a 15–3 victory, Taylor moved to the right wing to replace Bryan Williams who had returned home injured.

In 1978 Taylor played second five-eighth throughout the three-test series against Australia and against Ireland at Dublin.

After the 1978 tour of Britain and Ireland Taylor stayed and played in England for Wasps captaining the club in the 1980–81, 1981-82 and 1982–83 seasons, although he was ruled out of the final season by injury. In his first season as captain the Rothmans Rugby Yearbook stated that his "outspoken captaincy paid dividends for Wasps, who had their best season for twenty years". Taylor also played for the Middlesex county team and helped them reach the semi-final of the 1981-82 County Championship.

Taylor came back to New Zealand in 1982 and played for Hawkes Bay and was called into the All Black team for the 2nd test against Australia at Athletic Park replacing the injured Bill Osborne at second five-eighth.

In Taylor's career he played 72 first-class domestic matches and 27 matches for New Zealand, including nine internationals. At the top level he was known for his utility value in the back-line but his appearances were limited by selectors preferring Bill Osborne at second five-eighth and star wingers such as Bryan Williams and Stu Wilson.
