= Colorsport =

Sports photographic archive and agency

Colorsport Images Ltd
- Type: Private
- Industry: Sports photography
- Founded: 1969; 57 years ago in London, United Kingdom
- Founders: Colin Elsey, Stewart Fraser
- Headquarters: Surrey, United Kingdom
- Key people: Michael Breen (Director); David Norrie (Director); Kamal Shah (Director)
- Website: colorsport.co.uk

Colorsport Images Ltd is a sports photographic archive and agency, containing around 10 million images covering almost 150 years of sport, serving all forms of media outlets. The Colorsport partnership was set up in the late 1960s by photographers Colin Elsey and Stewart Fraser, and they were soon joined by Andrew Cowie.

The agency – as its name suggests - was among the earliest to cover sport in colour as well as black and white, especially football, rugby union and the Olympics.

== History ==
The business was established in the late 1960s when two sports photographers, Colin Elsey and Stewart Fraser, started to work together. They were initially based in Kings Cross before the business became established at St Peter’s Street in Islington for many years as it continued to expand. During that time Colorsport was the official photographer for the Rugby Football Union and Arsenal Football Club, as well as many sporting publications.

In 2003 the business, which had moved to Crouch End, lost Colin Elsey who died suddenly. At around the same time Stewart Fraser retired.

Colorsport gained new owners in late 2005, notably Nigel Wray, the owner of Saracens rugby club, and David Norrie, a former editor of Rugby World magazine and cricket and rugby correspondent of the News of the World, who became chairman. The business was moved to extensive new head offices in Surrey.

Andrew Cowie, who joined the business in 1972, is still active as a sports photographer and also now heads up Colorsport's library operations.

James Pinniger joined as Chief Executive at the start of 2009 from Reuters. Since that time Colorsport has revamped their online presence and developed a network of international partners. Colorsport photographers were nominated in two categories at the 2012 SJA British Sport Photography Awards, while Cowie's shot of Tony Woodcock's try for New Zealand in the 2011 Rugby World Cup final was voted the Sports Picture of the Year at the 2012 NAPA Awards.

== The Archive ==
Colorsport Images has acquired a number of older photo archives, principally the Albert Wilkes Collection, The Provincial Press Archive, and the Barrett Collection.

Colorsport has digitised these collections, enabling online distribution. They now operate a large commercial website which allows clients to search and browse for images, purchase usage rights and download images, in addition to a separate website that enables selected images from the archive to be ordered as consumer prints.

The Wilkes Collection, which contains many thousands of glass plates (mainly football and cricket), had been set up in the 1890s by Albert Wilkes, who played football for Aston Villa and England. Wilkes, and later his son, ran the business from West Bromwich for over sixty years.

Provincial Press had been based in Southport from the 1940s through to the 1970s, covering many FA Cup Finals, including the Matthews Final in 1953, as well as having contracts with Manchester United, Liverpool, Chelsea, Newcastle United and Arsenal football clubs among others.

== Photographers ==
Colin Elsey’s reputation as one of rugby union's leading photographer was established with his work on the all-conquering 1974 British Lions tour to South Africa and confirmed on the next Lions tour to New Zealand three years later when he took the iconic “Mudman” image of Fran Cotton peering out of the Wellington mud, considered by many to be among the greatest rugby photos ever taken.

Stewart Fraser, a winner of the 1967 World Press Photo sports award, became a specialist in covering winter and summer Olympic sports.

Andrew Cowie took up the mantle as Colorsport's soccer specialist - in 2010 in South Africa he covered his eighth World Cup for the company.

Several other distinguished photographers learnt their trade and came through the Colorsport ranks, such as Stuart McFarlane and Matthew Impey.

Current Colorsport photographers include Dan Rowley, Ian MacNicol, and Shaun Boggust.
