= Gwynfor Williams =

Welsh rugby union footballer

- Born: Gwynfor Williams; 1 February 1956 (age 70) Neath, Wales
- Height: 178 cm (5 ft 10 in)
- Weight: 73 kg (11 st 7 lb)
- Notable relative(s): Brynmor Williams, Lloyd Williams, Tom Williams

Rugby union career
- Position: centre
Amateur team(s)
| Years | Team | Apps | (Points) |
- Cross Keys RFC
| – | Newport RFC | | |
| – | Cardiff RFC | | |

Gwynfor James Williams (born 1 February 1956) is a former rugby union player. He played at scrum half or centre but club appearances for Cardiff RFC were limited by the presence of Gareth Edwards and Williams' older brother, Brynmor Williams. Williams was considered a great prospect but injuries hampered his development and progress. Having played for Newport RFC, Cardiff RFC and Cross Keys RFC, he played for his home-town club Cardigan RFC before finishing his career at Aberystwyth RFC.

In the 1981 Snelling Sevens Championship, he was awarded the Everson Award.
