= Lloyd Williams (rugby union, born 1989) =

Wales international rugby union player

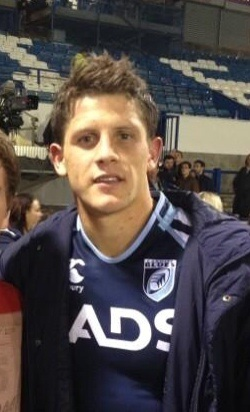
- Born: Lloyd Williams; 30 November 1989 (age 36) Cardiff, Wales
- Height: 183 cm (6 ft 0 in)
- Weight: 87 kg (13 st 10 lb; 192 lb)
- School: Cowbridge Comprehensive School
- Notable relative(s): Brynmor Williams; Gwynfor Williams; Tom Williams

Rugby union career
- Position: Scrum-half
- Current team: Worcester Warriors
Senior career
Years	Team	Apps	(Points)
2010–2023	Cardiff	254	(210)
2023–2025	Ealing Trailfinders	32	(35)
2025–	Worcester Warriors	14	(10)
- Correct as of 24 January 2023
International career
Years	Team	Apps	(Points)
2009	Wales U20	5	(5)
2011–2023	Wales	32	(10)
- Correct as of 24 January 2023
National sevens team
Years	Team		Comps
2010–2018	Wales		

Lloyd Williams (born 30 November 1989) is a Wales international rugby union player. A scrum-half, he plays club rugby for the Worcester Warriors. He attended Cowbridge Comprehensive School and Ysgol Gyfun Bro Morgannwg and he is a fluent Welsh speaker.

== Club career ==
Williams made his debut for Cardiff against Leinster on 7 March 2010.

A senior figure in the Cardiff team, Williams has captained the side on numerous occasions, the first coming against Montpellier in 2015.

Williams won the Challenge Cup in 2018, coming off the bench in the 31–30 comeback win over Gloucester in Bilbao.

In 2019, Williams made his 200th appearance for Cardiff, captaining his team on the occasion, as they won 30–17 over the Cheetahs.

Williams was named man of the match in Cardiff's record 35–0 victory over the Sharks in Durban.

On 10 December 2022, Williams made his 250th appearance for Cardiff, closing in on the club's cap record.

On 30 May 2023, after 13 seasons with home-club Cardiff, Williams would leave to join English club Ealing Trailfinders in the RFU Championship from the 2023-24 season.

On 19 May 2025, Williams would sign for Worcester Warriors on their return to the professional competition in the same competition ahead of the 2025-26 season.

== International career ==
Williams represented Wales at Under 20 level, appearing in the 2009 IRB Junior World Championship.

Prior to featuring for Wales, Williams represented the Barbarians against Wales on 4 June 2011, helping his side to a 31–28 victory.

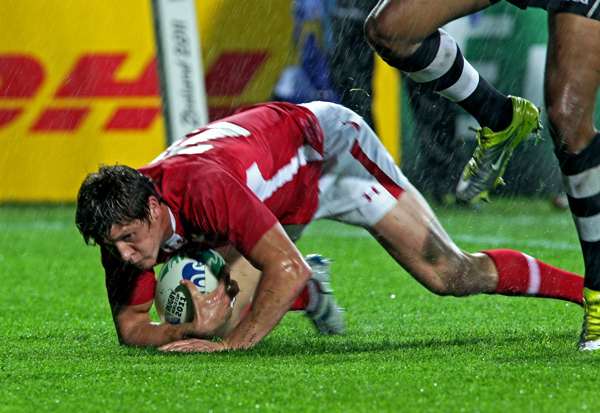
Williams in action against Fiji in the Pool D match at the 2011 Rugby World Cup

In June 2011 he was called into the Wales 45-man training squad for the 2011 Rugby World Cup following the suspension of Mike Phillips. He made his full international debut versus Argentina on 20 August 2011 as a second-half replacement.

Williams was selected in the final squad for the World Cup, and scored two tries in the pool stages, as Wales ultimately finished fourth in the tournament.

For the 2012 Six Nations, Williams maintained his place in the Welsh team, coming off the bench as Wales secured a Grand Slam against France on 17 March 2012.

The following season, Williams won a second Six Nations title with Wales, appearing as a substitute in all five of their matches in the 2013 Six Nations.

Williams was selected for the Welsh squad for the 2015 Rugby World Cup. He represented Wales in all five tests, including the win against England where Williams was forced to play on the wing, putting in a kick that won the game for Wales.

After nearly four years out of the Wales squad, Williams was recalled in 2020 for the Autumn Nations Series. On 28 November 2020, Williams made his first start for Wales in more than four years, his last coming against Japan in 2016.

Williams won a third Six Nations title with Wales in 2021, appearing off the bench in the win over Italy.

Williams has also represented Wales Sevens on numerous occasions, most recently in 2018.

=== International tries ===
Try	Opponent	Location	Venue	Competition	Date	Result
1	Namibia	New Plymouth, New Zealand	Yarrow Stadium	2011 Rugby World Cup	26 September 2011	Win
2	Fiji	Hamilton, New Zealand	Waikato Stadium	2011 Rugby World Cup	2 October 2011	Win

== Personal life ==
Lloyd Williams' father is former Wales international scrum-half Brynmor Williams. His younger brother Tom Williams is also a professional rugby union player.
