= Eric Watson (cricketer) =

New Zealand cricketer (1925–2017)

Personal information
- Full name: Eric Alexander Watson
- Born: 20 July 1925; Dunedin, Otago, New Zealand
- Died: 25 March 2017 (aged 91); Dunedin, Otago, New Zealand
- Batting: Right-handed
- Bowling: Right-arm medium
- Relatives: Leonard Watson (brother)

Domestic team information
- Years: Team
- 1947/48–1959/60: Otago
- FC debut: 13 March 1948 Otago v Fiji
- Last FC: 8 January 1960 Otago v Northern Districts

Career statistics
Competition	First-class
Matches	46
Runs scored	1,779
Batting average	21.43
100s/50s	1/8
Top score	103
Balls bowled	375
Wickets	41
Bowling average	30.46
5 wickets in innings	0
10 wickets in match	0
Best bowling	4/26
Catches/stumpings	48/–
- Source: CricketArchive, 20 January 2017

Eric Alexander Watson (20 July 1925 – 25 March 2017) was a New Zealand rugby union coach and sportsman. He coached the New Zealand national rugby union team for two years, played for the Otago Rugby Football Union, represented Otago at lawn bowls, and played 46 first-class cricket matches for the Otago cricket team.

== Playing career ==
Watson was born at Dunedin in 1925 and educated at High Street School in the city. A "talented" artist, he was unable to take up an art scholarship at the University of Otago due to financial pressures. A rugby second five-eighth, he played for the Zingari-Richmond club in Dunedin and represented Otago in 1946 before breaking his collarbone.

A cricketing all-rounder who played for the Albion club alongside three of his brothers, Watson made his first-class cricket debut the following season, making scores of 33 and 18 and taking a wicket against the touring Fijian team. He went on to play 46 times for the representative team, playing in the Plunket Shield each season between 1949–50 and 1957–58 before returning for two matches during the 1959–60 season. He scored a total of 1,779 runs and took 41 wickets for the province. His only top-level century, a score of 103 runs, was made against Central Districts in 1951–52. He frequently opened the batting for Otago alongside Bert Sutcliffe. Considered a fine slip fielder, he took 48 catches in first-class cricket.

Watson's brother, Len Watson, also played cricket, making three first-class appearances for Otago during the 1953–54 Shield season.

== Coaching career ==
Watson coached Zingari-Richmond and went on to coach Otago for nine seasons, developing a style of rugby which led to the team being described as the best that the 1971 British Lions had played in New Zealand by the team's coach Carwyn James. He went on to become the coach of the Junior All Blacks. He coached the team for seven seasons, during which time they completed an unbeaten tour of Australia and beat the full All Blacks team 14–10 in 1973. He was a selector for the New Zealand national team from 1974, having first been nominated for the position in 1972, and in 1979 was appointed as the coach of the All Blacks in April 1979.

His two years coaching the national team saw Watson lead the team against France on their 1979 tour of New Zealand before coaching on two unsuccessful tours of Australia and two successful tours of the Northern Hemisphere. After winning one and losing one Test match against France, a short tour of Australia saw New Zealand lose the only Test match 6–12, losing the Bledisloe Cup for the first time in 28 years. After winning two home matches against Argentina, the Northern hemisphere tour which followed saw the team lost only one match. On a "make-or-break tour" for Watson, New Zealand were victorious in both Tests, beating both England and Scotland. A 2–1 loss touring Australia again in 1980 put his position in some doubt, and Watson considered stepping down as coach before announcing that he was available to lead the team on a tour of North America and Wales later in the year, saying that he had been persuaded by the players to remain in the position.

The tour was a success, New Zealand winning all of their matches and defeating Wales 23–3 in the Welsh Rugby Football Union's Centennial Test match at Cardiff. Watson retired from all rugby after the tour, although he remained a member of Zingari-Richmond, later becoming a life member of the club and remaining associated with it for over 70 years.

== Personal life ==
Watson was married twice, both of his wives dying of cancer, and had two daughters. He played lawn bowls at the St Clair club in Dunedin and represented Otago.

Watson died at the Leslie Groves Hospital in Dunedin in 2017. He was aged 91.

Sporting positions
Preceded by Jack Gleeson	All Blacks coach 1979–1980	Succeeded by Peter Burke
