= Gareth Evans (rugby union, born 1952) =

British Lions & Wales international rugby union footballer

- Born: Gareth Evans; 2 November 1952 (age 74) Newport, Wales
- Height: 5 ft 11 in (1.80 m)
- Weight: 14 st 2 lb (90 kg)

Rugby union career
- Position: Centre/Wing
International career
Years	Team	Apps	(Points)
1977-1978	Wales	3	(0)
1977	British Lions	3	(0)

Gareth Lloyd Evans (born 2 November 1952 in Newport) is a former Wales international rugby union player. He played club rugby for Newport RFC as either or a wing or a centre. He made his debut for Wales in February 1977 as a replacement for Gerald Davies against France at the Parc des Princes. Later that year he was selected for the 1977 British Lions tour to New Zealand and played on the wing in the last three internationals against the All Blacks. He played two further games for Wales, against France and Australia in 1978.
