= Tane Norton =

New Zealand rugby union player (1942–2023)

Tane Norton MNZM
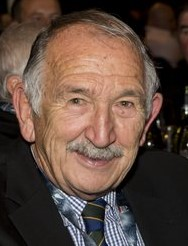
- Norton in 2017
- Born: Rangitane Will Norton; 30 March 1942 Waikari, New Zealand
- Died: 4 August 2023 (aged 81) Christchurch, New Zealand
- Height: 1.83 m (6 ft 0 in)
- Weight: 87 kg (13 st 10 lb)
- School: Methven District High School

Rugby union career
- Position: Hooker
Provincial / State sides
Years	Team	Apps	(Points)
1961–	Mid Canterbury		
1969–	Canterbury	82	
International career
Years	Team	Apps	(Points)
1969–1977	New Zealand Māori		
1971–1977	New Zealand	27	(0)

Rangitane Will Norton MNZM (30 March 1942 – 4 August 2023), commonly known as Tane Norton, was a New Zealand rugby union player. He played at the hooker position. He played for Linwood before he first represented Canterbury in 1969. In 1977, he captained the All Blacks to a series win over the British Lions and played three games for the World Invitation XV in South Africa.

In the 2006 New Year Honours, Norton was appointed a Member of the New Zealand Order of Merit, for services to rugby.

Of Māori descent, Norton affiliated to Ngāi Tahu through his father. In 1973 and 1974, Norton was awarded the Tom French Cup for the outstanding Māori rugby union player of the year.

Norton died in Christchurch on 4 August 2023, at the age of 81.

== See also ==
- 1977 British Lions tour to New Zealand

Sporting positions
Preceded by Andy Leslie	All Blacks captain 1977	Succeeded by Graham Mourie
Awards
Preceded by Sid Going	Tom French Memorial; Māori rugby union player of the year 1973, 1974	Succeeded by Bill Bush
