= Tom Williams (rugby union, born 1991) =

Welsh rugby player (born 1991)

- Born: Tom Williams; 2 April 1991 (age 35) Bridgend, Wales
- Height: 182 cm (6 ft 0 in)
- Weight: 96 kg (15 st 2 lb)
- School: Cowbridge Grammar School
- Notable relative(s): Brynmor Williams, Lloyd Williams, Gwynfor Williams

Rugby union career
- Position: Wing/Fullback
- Current team: Jersey Reds
Senior career
Years	Team	Apps	(Points)
2010-2015	Cardiff RFC	41	(90)
2015-18	Carmarthen Quins	17	(25)
- Correct as of 22 October 2018
Provincial / State sides
Years	Team	Apps	(Points)
2012-	Cardiff Blues	22	(10)
2015-16	→ Scarlets	9	(5)
2016-18	Scarlets	19	(22)
- Correct as of 22 October 2018

Tom Williams (born 2 April 1991) is a Welsh rugby union coach and former player.

A full-back or wing, he played for Jersey Reds in the English RFU Championship having previously played for Scarlets and Cardiff Blues.

== Playing career ==
His older brother Lloyd Williams is a Wales international rugby union player and his father is former Wales international scrum-half Brynmor Williams.

Williams began his career with Cardiff RFC, making his debut against Aberavon in 2010. Two years later, he made his Cardiff Blues debut against Newport Gwent Dragons. After 3 years with the region, he moved on loan to Scarlets. On 3 May 2016, it was announced that Williams had signed a two-year contract with the Scarlets

He was selected in the Wales Sevens squad for 2012-13

He played for Jersey Reds from 2019 to 2021.

== Coaching career ==
Williams was assistant backs coach at Jersey Reds from 2021 to 2023, helping them win the 2022–23 RFU Championship.

Williams joined Newcastle Falcons as transition coach in September 2023. He became attack coach at Falcons in a re-organisation in November 2023. He left Newcastle Falcons on 16 December 2024.
