= Merv Jaffray =

- Born: Mervyn William Rutherford Jaffray; 18 January 1949 (age 77) Dunedin, New Zealand
- Height: 1.83 m (6 ft 0 in)
- Weight: 90 kg (200 lb)
- School: Kaikorai Valley High School
- Notable relative: Lyn Jaffray (brother)

Rugby union career
- Position(s): Flanker; Number 8
Provincial / State sides
Years	Team	Apps	(Points)
1971–78	Otago	104	
International career
Years	Team	Apps	(Points)
1976	New Zealand	0	(0)
Coaching career
- Years: Team
- 1980–82: Nelson Bays

Mervyn William Rutherford Jaffray (born 18 January 1949) is a former New Zealand rugby union player. A back rower, Jaffray represented Otago at a provincial level, and was a member of the New Zealand national side, the All Blacks, on their 1976 tour to South America. He played four matches for the All Blacks but no full internationals.
