= Cotton Traders =

English clothing company

Cotton Traders Ltd
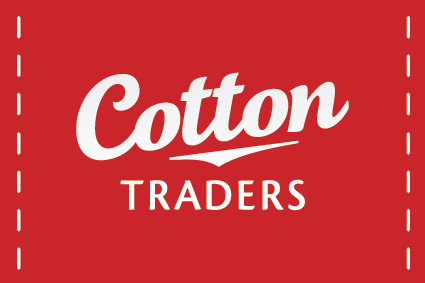
- Company type: Subsidiary
- Industry: Retail, Textile
- Founded: 24 April 1987 (39 years ago)
- Founders: Fran Cotton; Steve Smith
- Headquarters: Altrincham, UK
- Key people: Steve Smith (Chairman) (Note: Chairman of parent company); Nick Hamblin (CEO) (Note: CEO of parent company)
- Products: Clothing, lingerie, footwear, accessories
- Parent: CorpAcq Finance Limited
- Website: cottontraders.com

Cotton Traders is a British clothing company, specialising in leisurewear, based in Altrincham, Greater Manchester, England. It was founded in 1987 by former England national rugby union team captains Fran Cotton and Steve Smith.

Cotton Traders' range of products commercialised include clothing, lingerie, footwear, and accessories such as bags, scarves, socks, hats, and belts. In past years, the company also produced rugby union kit uniforms.

== History ==
Cotton Traders is a multichannel British clothing retailer founded in 1987 by former England rugby captains, Fran Cotton and Steve Smith, and based in Altrincham, England. The company sells casual clothing and footwear collections for men and women, plus a new homeware collection, Cotton Home, in over 25 countries worldwide.

The company started out in a small room next to Altrincham railway station, supplying rugby shirts via mail order using advertisements in the Sunday newspapers. After two years in business, Cotton Traders reached an annual turnover of £2million with new men's and women's casual clothing collections being added to their offering, followed by footwear and accessories. Today, it is a multichannel retailer, employing a staff of more than 800 with an annual gross turnover of more than £86 million.

Starting in 1991, the company signed license agreements to produce and sell replica jerseys of some of the main rugby national teams in the world, including England, South Africa (1992), and Wales (1994). President of South Africa and leader Nelson Mandela attended the 1995 Rugby World Cup final wearing a replica shirt by Cotton Traders.

In 1997, clothing retailer Next purchased a share of the business with the other two-thirds owned by the founders. In 2014, Cotton and Smith bought back the 33% share of Cotton Traders held by Next, regaining full ownership of the company.

In May 2018, fellow Altrincham-based company, CorpAcq, acquired a majority stake in Cotton Traders. CorpAcq was formed in 2006 by founder and Chairman, Simon Orange. Its portfolio of at least 20 businesses has a combined turnover of over £200m. CorpAcq also owns the rugby union club, Sale Sharks, where Cotton Traders co-founders Fran Cotton and Steve Smith sit on the board.

The company operates from three main buildings in Altrincham, and a distribution centre in Nottingham. Head office departments are split between Cotton Traders House, Cotton Mill (formerly Neptune House) and the Cotton Hub.

Cotton Traders operates 80 retail stores nationwide in high street, retail outlets, garden centres and travel locations. They also provide an overseas delivery service to over 25 countries, with dedicated websites for customers internationally, in Ireland and Australia.

== Rose symbol legal action ==
The court stated the red rose was a symbol associated with England and not the RFU

Cotton Traders were the official suppliers of rugby kit to the Rugby Football Union (RFU) between 1991 and 1997, including supplying the rugby shirts worn by the England national rugby union team. As an official supplier, Cotton Traders also produced replica shirts for sale to the public. Following the loss of the contract to Nike in 1997, Cotton Traders continued producing a rugby shirt for sale in the style of the English national team, namely a white shirt with a red rose emblem on the chest.

This culminated in a legal case being brought against Cotton Traders by the RFU and Nike in 2002, seeking to ban the sale of what they deemed 'unauthorised merchandise'. A High Court judge ruled in favour of Cotton Traders in the case, citing that the classic style rose used on the Cotton Traders shirt was associated with England as a country or team and not the RFU specifically, and as such it could not be registered as a trademark.
