= Clive Williams (rugby union) =

Welsh rugby union footballer

- Born: Clive Williams; 2 November 1947 (age 79) Porthcawl, Wales
- Height: 183 cm (6 ft 0 in)
- Weight: 99 kg (15 st 8 lb)
- School: Porthcawl Comprehensive

Rugby union career
- Position: Prop
Amateur team(s)
Years	Team	Apps	(Points)
- Porthcawl RFC
–	Neath RFC		
–	Swansea RFC		
–	Aberavon RFC		
–	Barbarian F.C.		
International career
Years	Team	Apps	(Points)
1977-1983	Wales	8	(0)
1977-1980	British Lions	4	(4)

Clive Williams (born 2 November 1947) is a former Wales international rugby union player. He toured twice with the British & Irish Lions, to New Zealand in 1977 and to South Africa in 1980.

Williams came to prominence playing for Aberavon RFC where he became a formidable scrummager under the coaching of the ex-Welsh International prop – Phil Morgan.

He was selected for the 1977 Lions tour but remarkably on his return to his club, he lost his place to the then un-capped John Richardson.

Williams left the club and joined Swansea RFC and was again selected to play for the 1980 Lions.
