= Pat Ryan (rugby union) =

New Zealand rugby union player

- Born: Patrick John Ryan; 20 April 1950 Pahiatua, New Zealand
- Died: 5 March 1985 (aged 34) Taupō, New Zealand
- Height: 1.88 m (6 ft 2 in)
- Weight: 95 kg (209 lb)
- School: St. Patrick's College, Silverstream
- Occupation: Butcher

Rugby union career
- Position: Loose forward
Provincial / State sides
Years	Team	Apps	(Points)
1969–70	Bush	9	
1971–74	Wairarapa Bush	42	
1975–78	Hawke's Bay	56	
International career
Years	Team	Apps	(Points)
1976	New Zealand	0	(0)

Patrick John Ryan (20 April 1950 – 5 March 1985) was a New Zealand rugby union player. A loose forward, Ryan represented Bush, Wairarapa Bush, and Hawke's Bay at a provincial level. He was a member of the New Zealand national side, the All Blacks, on the 1976 tour of South America, playing in five matches but no full internationals.

Ryan was described as "never far from the ball, extremely fit, a grand forward with the ball in hand, a fine cover defender and tackler".

He died of cancer in 1985 and was buried in Taupo Public Cemetery.

His father, Bill, played for Wairarapa Bush between 1948 and 1952.
