= Paul Sapsford =

NZ international rugby union player

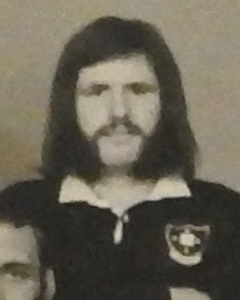
- Sapsford in 1973
- Born: Herbert Paul Sapsford; 8 September 1949 Invercargill, New Zealand
- Died: 29 December 2009 (aged 60) Lake Ōhau, New Zealand
- Height: 1.80 m (5 ft 11 in)
- Weight: 102 kg (225 lb)
- School: James Hargest High School
- University: University of Otago
- Occupation: Dentist

Rugby union career
- Position: Prop
Provincial / State sides
Years	Team	Apps	(Points)
1973–76, 79, 82	Otago	85	
-	Middlesex		
International career
Years	Team	Apps	(Points)
1973–76	NZ Universities		
1976	New Zealand	0	(0)

Herbert Paul Sapsford (8 September 1949 – 29 December 2009) was a New Zealand rugby union player. A prop, Sapsford represented Otago at a provincial level, and was a member of the New Zealand national side, the All Blacks, on the 1976 tour of South America. He played seven matches on that tour, including the two unofficial internationals against Argentina.

Sapsford died from injuries sustained in a jetboat accident near the confluence of the Dobson and Hopkins Rivers at the head of Lake Ōhau. He was buried in Allanton Cemetery.
