= Ash McGregor (rugby player) =

- Born: Ashley Alton McGregor; 3 September 1953 (age 73) Gore, New Zealand
- Height: 1.85 m (6 ft 1 in)
- Weight: 93 kg (205 lb)
- Occupation: Farmer

Rugby union career
- Position: Loose forward
Provincial / State sides
Years	Team	Apps	(Points)
1976–80	Southland	45	
1981	Otago	3	
International career
Years	Team	Apps	(Points)
1978	New Zealand	0	(0)

Ashley Alton "Ash" McGregor (born 3 September 1953) is a former New Zealand rugby union player. A loose forward, McGregor represented Southland and, briefly, Otago at a provincial level. He was a member of the New Zealand national side, the All Blacks, on their 1978 tour of Britain and Ireland, playing three matches but no internationals.
