= Lynn Hallett =

Wales international rugby league footballer

Personal information
- Full name: Lynn Hallett

Playing information
- Position: Fullback, Stand-off
Club
Years	Team	Pld	T	G	FG	P
1981–85	Cardiff City (Bridgend) Blue Dragons	94	14	126	41	342
Representative
Years	Team	Pld	T	G	FG	P
1982–84	Wales	2

Lynn Hallett is a former professional rugby league footballer who played in the 1980s. He played at representative level for Wales, and at club level for Cardiff City (Bridgend) Blue Dragons, as a fullback or stand-off.

== International honours ==
Lynn Hallett won 2 caps for Wales in 1982–1984 while at Cardiff City (Bridgend) Blue Dragons 2-goals 4-points.

== Note ==
Before the start of the 1984/85 season, Cardiff City Blue Dragons relocated from Ninian Park in Cardiff, to Coychurch Road Ground in Bridgend, and were renamed Bridgend Blue Dragons.
