= Laurie Knight =

- Born: Lawrence Alfred George Knight; 16 July 1901 Auckland, New Zealand
- Died: 24 December 1973 (aged 72) Auckland, New Zealand
- Height: 1.88 m (6 ft 2 in)
- Weight: 86 kg (190 lb)
- School: Auckland Grammar School
- Notable relative(s): Lawrie Knight (son); Arthur Knight (brother)

Rugby union career
- Position: Loose forward
Provincial / State sides
Years	Team	Apps	(Points)
1921–30	Auckland		
International career
Years	Team	Apps	(Points)
1925	New Zealand	0	(0)

Lawrence Alfred George Knight (16 July 1901 – 24 December 1973) was a New Zealand rugby union player. He was educated at Ellerslie Primary and then Auckland Grammar School. A loose forward, Knight represented and captained Auckland at a provincial level, making his debut as a 19-year-old. Knight was a member of the New Zealand national side, the All Blacks, in 1925. He played five matches for the All Blacks but did not appear in any tests. He died in Auckland in 1973, four months before his son Lawrie Knight was named in the 1974 All Blacks, and his ashes were buried at Purewa Cemetery.

Knight's younger brother, Arthur, was also an All Black. His cousin, Orton Wallace "Wally" Knight, was an Auckland, Manawatu and Canterbury representative and also played for England Services during World War II.
