= John Loveday (rugby union) =

New Zealand rugby union player (1949–2023)

- Born: John Kelman Loveday; 1 May 1949 Palmerston North, New Zealand
- Died: 20 May 2023 (aged 74) Taupō, New Zealand
- Height: 1.93 m (6 ft 4 in)
- Weight: 112 kg (247 lb)
- School: Palmerston North Boys' High School
- University: Palmer College of Chiropractic
- Occupation: Chiropractor

Rugby union career
- Position: Lock
Provincial / State sides
Years	Team	Apps	(Points)
1969, 1974–79	Manawatu	65	
International career
Years	Team	Apps	(Points)
1978	New Zealand	0	(0)

John Kelman Loveday (1 May 1949 – 20 May 2023) was a New Zealand rugby union player. A lock, Loveday represented Manawatu at a provincial level, and was a member of the New Zealand national side, the All Blacks, on their 1978 tour of Britain and Ireland. He played seven matches on that tour, missing some of the early games because of back trouble. Loveday did not appear in any internationals.

Loveday died in Taupō on 20 May 2023, at the age of 74.
