= Arthur Knight (rugby union) =

New Zealand rugby union player

- Born: 26 January 1906 Auckland, New Zealand
- Died: 26 April 1990 (aged 84) Auckland, New Zealand
- Height: 1.88 m (6 ft 2 in)
- Weight: 95 kg (209 lb)
- Notable relative(s): Laurie Knight (brother); Lawrie Knight (nephew)

Rugby union career
- Position: Loose forward
Provincial / State sides
Years	Team	Apps	(Points)
1925–36	Auckland	67	
International career
Years	Team	Apps	(Points)
1926–34	New Zealand	1	(3)

Arthur Knight (26 January 1906 – 26 April 1990) was a New Zealand rugby union player. A loose forward, Knight represented Auckland at a provincial level, and was a member of the New Zealand national side, the All Blacks, between 1926 and 1934. He played 14 matches for the All Blacks including one international.
