= Stewart Cron =

- Born: Stewart Edward George Cron; 7 July 1946 (age 80) Hokitika, New Zealand
- Height: 1.83 m (6 ft 0 in)
- Weight: 90 kg (200 lb)
- School: Christchurch West High School
- Occupation: School teacher

Rugby union career
- Position: Flanker
Amateur team(s)
Years	Team	Apps	(Points)
–	Christchurch Suburbs		
Provincial / State sides
Years	Team	Apps	(Points)
1967–76	Canterbury		
International career
Years	Team	Apps	(Points)
1976	New Zealand	0	(0)

Stewart Edward George Cron (born 7 July 1946) is a former New Zealand rugby union player. A flanker, Cron represented Canterbury at a provincial level, and was a member of the New Zealand national side, the All Blacks, on their 1976 tour to South America. On that tour he played six matches for the All Blacks, including the two unofficial tests against Argentina.
