= Steve Fenwick =

GB & Wales dual-code international rugby footballer

- Born: Steven Paul Fenwick; 23 July 1951 (age 75) Caerphilly, Wales
- Height: 1.78 m (5 ft 10 in)
- Weight: 84 kg (13 st 3 lb)
- School: Caerphilly Grammar Technical School; Borough Road College

Rugby union career
- Position: Centre
Amateur team(s)
Years	Team	Apps	(Points)
- Taffs Well RFC
1971-73	Beddau RFC		
1973-81	Bridgend RFC		
- Barbarian F.C.
International career
Years	Team	Apps	(Points)
1975-81	Wales	30	(152)
1977	British Lions	4	(0)
- Rugby league career

Playing information
- Position: Back
Club
Years	Team	Pld	T	G	FG	P
1981–1984	Cardiff City Blue Dragons	85	25			480
Representative
Years	Team	Pld	T	G	FG	P
1981–1982	Wales	2				10

Steven Paul Fenwick (born 23 July 1951) is a Welsh former rugby union, and professional rugby league footballer who played in the 1970s and 1980s. He played representative level rugby union (RU) for Wales, and at club level for Bridgend RFC, as a centre, i.e. number 12 or 13, and representative level rugby league (RL) for Wales, and at club level for Cardiff City (Bridgend) Blue Dragons, as a centre.

== Background ==
Steve Fenwick was born in Caerphilly, Wales.

== Rugby union career ==
Fenwick played rugby as a schoolboy for Caerphilly Grammar Technical School, and later joined Taffs Well RFC. In 1971 he switched to Beddau where he played 51 games before moving on to the first class team Bridgend. While at Bridgend Fenwick earned all of his 30 international caps for Wales, making his début against France in 1975, in which he scored a try after only five minutes, and finished the game with a personal tally of 9 points. He was a member of the 1977 British Lions tour to New Zealand, in which he played in all four Tests. On this tour he played 9 provincial games and 4 tests and scored 2 Tries, 1 con and 3 pens. He also captained Wales in the Centenary game against the All Blacks in 1980. He also played for a World XV on 9 August 1980 against Argentina in Buenos Aires, losing 36–22.

== Rugby league career ==
In August 1981 Fenwick switched from rugby union to professional rugby league, signing to the Cardiff City Blue Dragons. He scored 18 tries, 212 goals and 2 field goals during his Cardiff career. He made his début for Cardiff against Salford scoring four goals in the match. Fenwick went on to win two caps with the Wales national rugby league team between 1981 and 1982 scoring five goals.

Before the start of the 1984/85 season, Cardiff City Blue Dragons relocated from Ninian Park in Cardiff, to Coychurch Road Ground in Bridgend, and were renamed Bridgend Blue Dragons.

== Personal history ==
A former teacher, he set up in business with a former Wales and Lions player Tommy David, another player who had turned to league.
