= Mike Davies (rugby league) =

Wales international rugby league footballer

Personal information
- Full name: Michael Davies
- Born: 18 August 1962 (age 64) Wales

Playing information
- Position: Centre
Club
Years	Team	Pld	T	G	FG	P
1983–85	Bridgend Blue Dragons	26	5	0	1	21
Representative
Years	Team	Pld	T	G	FG	P
1984	Wales	1	0	0	0	0

Michael Davies (born 18 August 1962), also known by the nickname of "Dio", is a Welsh former professional rugby league footballer who played in the 1980s. He played at representative level for Wales, and at club level for Cardiff City (Bridgend) Blue Dragons, as a centre.

== International honours ==
Mike Davies won a cap for Wales while at Cardiff City (Bridgend) Blue Dragons in 1984.

== Notes ==
Before the start of the 1984/85 season, Cardiff City Blue Dragons relocated from Ninian Park in Cardiff, to Coychurch Road Ground in Bridgend, and were renamed Bridgend Blue Dragons.
