= Albert Wilkes =

English sports photographer and footballer

Personal information
- Date of birth: 6 September 1875
- Date of death: 9 December 1936 (aged 61)
- Height: 5 ft 7 in (1.70 m)
- Position: Midfielder

Senior career*
Years	Team	Apps	(Gls)
- West Bromwich Albion
1896–1898	Walsall		
1898–1907	Aston Villa	158	(7)
1907–1908	Fulham		
1909	Chesterfield Town		

International career
1901–1902	England	5	(1)
- * Club domestic league appearances and goals

Albert Wilkes (6 September 1875 – 9 December 1936) was an English sports photographer and footballer in the early years of professional football in England, who played for Aston Villa from August 1898 to July 1907. Before playing for Villa he played for West Bromwich Albion and Walsall.

A player of parts and a worthy follower of past Villa heroes. Scrupulously fair and honest in tackling, a willing worker, and an adept at finding openings for goal in big games. No place in the half-back line comes amiss to him. A quite, unostentatious player of the untiring order, he has done his share in raising the tone of football both on and off the field. 'Straight as a die', he is a general and deserved favourite.

The Villa News and Record 1 September 1906

Wilkes instantly experienced success at Villa Park, playing a bit part in the club's 1898–99 title success before establishing himself as a first team regular in their 1899–1900 title victory. He was less fortunate in the FA cup where he found himself part of a Villa side beaten in a famous cup upset by Southern League Millwall Athletic.

He made five appearances for England, between March 1901 and May 1902, scoring the equalizing goal against Scotland in a 2–2 draw at Villa Park on 3 May 1902 – this was the replay of the match that was abandoned as a result of the first Ibrox disaster on 5 April 1902, in which 25 people died and 517 were injured.

He began his photographic career whilst still a player and he continued until his death. His son Albert Wilkes Junior continued the business until it was sold to leading photographic agency Colorsport in 1970.
