= Cardiff City Blue Dragons =

Defunct Welsh rugby league club

Coordinates: 51.474983°N 3.200509°W

Logo of the Cardiff City Blue Dragons

Cardiff City Blue Dragons were a rugby league team formed in 1981. Their home ground was initially Ninian Park, which was also used by Cardiff City F.C. The club spent three seasons in Cardiff before relocating to Bridgend in 1984 as the Bridgend Blue Dragons, and were finally wound up in 1986. The team colours were royal blue shirts with a yellow and white vee. The shorts and socks were also blue.

In 2014, two Rugby League clubs in the city, Cardiff Demons and Cardiff Spartans, merged as Cardiff City Blue Dragons RLFC and the name was revived and a new club formed, with a modernised badge and kit paying homage to the original side. The 1st and 2nd open age sides played senior home matches at Cardiff Arms Park during the 2015 Welsh Conference season. In 2017, they played at The Memorial Ground, Ely, following a partnership with Glamorgan Wanderers RFC. The club includes Wales' first Women's Rugby League side and is the largest in Wales by number of registered players.

== History ==
=== Early history of rugby league in Cardiff ===
The first rugby league team formed in Cardiff were Cardiff City Northern Union in November 1907. They played their first and possibly only match against Merthyr Tydfil, in Merthyr, on Christmas Day in 1907, losing 25-3. Despite having a few more matches arranged, including one away to Ebbw Vale on New Years Day in 1908, no other results have so far been found.

In 1947–48 and 1951–52, following a successful stint in the Welsh League, Cardiff was elected to the Rugby Football League. However, after one disastrous season with low attendances, the club withdrew.

=== Cardiff City Blue Dragons RLFC ===
The initial success of rugby league teams Carlisle and Fulham RLFC which were backed by Carlisle United and Fulham association football clubs respectively, encouraged Cardiff City to form Cardiff City Blue Dragons for the 1981–82 season. Their managing director was David Watkins, their coach was John Mantle. The club initially signed three (former) rugby union internationals – Steve Fenwick, Tommy David and Paul Ringer. A fourth (former) international, Brynmor Williams, was signed later ish

Their first game against Salford on 30 August 1981 attracted a crowd of 9,247. Despite finishing half-way up the Second Division in their first season, success on the field was elusive and the club failed to win promotion in three seasons at Ninian Park. Towards the end of their tenure in Cardiff crowds had dwindled to about 500 and they were forced into liquidation after the death of Cardiff City chairman Bob Grogan. Their last home game was a 28–26 loss to York.

In July 1984, the club was bought out of liquidation by a consortium. The new owners came under pressure from the Welsh FA who wanted Ninian Park as their permanent headquarters and were opposed to ground sharing with rugby league. As a result, the Blue Dragons changed their name to Bridgend Blue Dragons and relocated the club to Bridgend Town AFC's Coychurch Road ground.

=== Bridgend Blue Dragons RLFC ===
Their first home game on 9 September 1984 attracted a crowd of 1,983 to watch Bridgend go down 28–16 to Swinton. After that attendances dropped and by February 1985 less than 200 fans were watching the home games. Their lowest gate was 148 for the final home game against Doncaster on 21 April 1985 when they went down 28–10. The club finished bottom of the Second Division with only one win.

Four days before the start of the 1986–87 season, the Rugby Football League dropped Bridgend Blue Dragons from the fixtures for failing to secure a ground. Further, Bridgend RLFC decided not to seek reinstatement.

== Players earning international caps while at Cardiff City (Bridgend) Blue Dragons ==
- Chris Camilleri won caps for Wales while at Barrow in 1980 against France, while at Widnes in 1982 against Australia, and while at Cardiff City (Bridgend) Blue Dragons in 1984 against England, and won caps for Great Britain while at Barrow in 1980 against New Zealand (2 matches)
- Mike Davies won a cap for Wales while at Cardiff City (Bridgend) Blue Dragons 1984 1-cap
- Tommy David won caps for Wales while at Cardiff City (Bridgend) Blue Dragons in 1981 against England, and in 1982 against Australia
- Steve Fenwick won caps for Wales while at Cardiff City (Bridgend) Blue Dragons 1981…1982 2-caps 5-goals 10-points
- Ness Flowers won caps for Wales while at Wigan, and Cardiff City (Bridgend) Blue Dragons 1980…1984 4-caps 1-tries 3-points
- Lynn Hallett won caps for Wales while at Cardiff City (Bridgend) Blue Dragons 1982…1984 2-caps 2-goals 4-points
- Christopher O'Brien won a cap for Wales while at Cardiff City (Bridgend) Blue Dragons 1984
- Gordon Pritchard won caps for Wales while at Barrow, and Cardiff City (Bridgend) Blue Dragons 1978…1981 1(3?)-caps + 2-caps (sub)
- Paul Ringer won caps for Wales (RL) while at Cardiff City (Bridgend) Blue Dragons 1981…1982 2-caps
- Graham Walters won caps for Wales while at Hull FC, and Bridgend Blue Dragons 1980…1984 2(3?)-caps + 1-cap (sub)
- Brynmor Williams won a cap for Wales (RL) while at Cardiff City Blue Dragons 1982 1-cap 1-try 3-points

== See also ==
- Sport in Cardiff
- Rugby league in Wales
