= Gordon Pritchard =

Welsh RU coach & Wales international rugby league footballer

Personal information
- Born: 26 September 1954 (age 70); Cardiff, Wales

Playing information

Rugby union
- Position: Wing
Club
Years	Team	Pld	T	G	FG	P
1973–74	Cardiff RFC	8
1974–75	Newport RFC	26	2
	Total	34	2	0	0	0

Rugby league
- Position: Fullback
Club
Years	Team	Pld	T	G	FG	P
1975–76	Leeds
1976–78	Bradford Northern
≤1978–≥78	Barrow
≤1980–≥80	Huddersfield
≥1980–≥80	Eastern Suburbs (NZ)
≥1980–≥80	Huddersfield		1
≤1981–≥81	Cardiff City (Bridgend) Blue Dragons		1
	Total	0	2	0	0	0
Representative
Years	Team	Pld	T	G	FG	P
1978–81	Wales	6

Coaching information
Club
Years	Team	Gms	W	D	L	W%
≤1998–≥98	Tondu RFC
≤2001–02	Caerphilly RFC
	Machen RFC
	Total	0	0	0	0

Gordon Pritchard (born 26 September 1954) is a Welsh rugby union and professional rugby league footballer who played in the 1970s and 1980s, and coached rugby union in the 1990s and 2000s. He played club level rugby union (RU) for Cardiff RFC, and Newport RFC, as a wing, and representative level rugby league (RL) for Wales, and at club level for Leeds, Bradford Northern, Barrow, Huddersfield (two spells), Eastern Suburbs (in Canterbury, New Zealand), and Cardiff City (Bridgend) Blue Dragons, as a fullback, and coached club level rugby union (RU) for Tondu RFC, Caerphilly RFC, .Senghenydd RFC and Machen RFC

== Playing career ==
=== International honours ===
Gordon Pritchard won caps for Wales while at Barrow, and Cardiff City (Bridgend) Blue Dragons 1978…1981 1(3?)-caps + 2-caps (interchange/substitute).

=== Club career ===
Pritchard played a season with the Eastern Suburbs club in the Canterbury Rugby League competition.

== Note ==
Before the start of the 1984/85 season, Cardiff City Blue Dragons relocated from Ninian Park in Cardiff, to Coychurch Road Ground in Bridgend, and were renamed Bridgend Blue Dragons.
