= Len Watson =

New Zealand cricketer (1927–2013)

Personal information
- Full name: Leonard Frank Watson
- Born: 11 October 1927; Dunedin, Otago, New Zealand
- Died: 5 August 2013 (aged 85); Dunedin, Otago, New Zealand
- Batting: Right-handed
- Bowling: Right-arm off spin
- Role: Batsman
- Relatives: Eric Watson (brother)

Domestic team information
- Years: Team
- 1953/54: Otago
- Source: CricInfo, 27 May 2016

Leonard Frank "Len" Watson (11 October 1927 – 5 August 2013) was a New Zealand cricketer. He played three first-class matches for Otago during the 1953–54 season.

Watson was born at Dunedin in 1927 and educated at High Street School in the city. He played club cricket for the Albion club in the city as a right-handed batsman. He was selected for Otago age-group sides as early as 1945, but played only three times for the senior representative side, appearing in the first three of Otago's Plunket Shield matches during the 1953–54 season.

A batsman who was known for his "solid defence" and who was difficult to get out, Watson opened the batting in each of his Shield matches. He scored a total of 96 runs, with a highest score of 22 made against Central Districts in his final match. In each match he played alongside his older brother Eric, Len opening the batting and Eric batting third in the Otago order.

The brothers played together for Albion–along with two other brothers, Albie and Les–and in other Otago sides, including a match in January 1960 against the Canterbury B side in which they opened the batting together―Len making 51 and Eric 102, an innings which saw the older Watson called back in to the Otago side for the last of his 46 matches for the representative team. Despite a number of other good performances, including a century scored for an Otago XI against the touring Rockdale Kia Ora side from Australia in January 1957, Len was never recalled by Otago.

Watson died at Dunedin in 2013. He was aged 85. His cremated ashes were buried at Andersons Bay Cemetery.
