= Tommy David =

Great Britain and Wales dual-code rugby international footballer

Tom David
- Born: Thomas Patrick David; 2 April 1948 (age 78) Pontypridd, Wales
- School: Hawthorn Secondary Modern

Rugby union career
- Position: Flanker
Senior career
Years	Team	Apps	(Points)
1967-1971	Pontypridd RFC		
1972–1976	Llanelli RFC	76	(116)
1976–1981	Pontypridd RFC	404	
1973-1980	Barbarians	19	(28)
International career
Years	Team	Apps	(Points)
1973–1976	Wales	4	(0)
1974	British Lions	0	(0)
- Rugby league career

Playing information
- Position: Forward, Prop
Club
Years	Team	Pld	T	G	FG	P
1981–1984	Cardiff City Blue Dragons	81	51			171
Representative
Years	Team	Pld	T	G	FG	P
1981–1982	Wales	2	0	0	0	0

Thomas Patrick David (born 2 April 1948) is a Welsh former dual-code international rugby union and rugby league footballer who played in the 1970s and 1980s. He was born in Pontypridd, and played representative rugby union (RU) for Wales and the British Lions and rugby league (RL) for Wales. He was selected for the 1974 British Lions tour to South Africa, and at the time played club rugby for Llanelli RFC. He also played for his home-town club Pontypridd RFC, and while at the club was part of the 1976 Grand Slam winning Wales team. In 1981 he switched codes to rugby league, representing Cardiff City Blue Dragons.

== Rugby career ==
Thomas David commonly known as Tom or Tommy, was given the nickname "Tom the Bomb", and was noted for his diving, try-scoring prowess, which would be used to great effect in Pontypridd's 1975/76 season. David was a fitter by trade, but would later become a company director.

David was a keen rugby player as a youth, and represented his school, Hawthorn Secondary Modern before joining Pontypridd. In 1972 he switched to Llanelli, and was chosen to face New Zealand when the All Blacks played Llanelli as part of their 1972/73 tour. The game saw a historic win for Llanelli, beating New Zealand 9–3. This was the first of two encounters for David against the same touring All Blacks as he also played flanker in the Barbarian side of 1973 who were victorious against New Zealand at Cardiff Arms Park. In between the two victories, the Wales national team also faced the New Zealanders, and many critics felt that David's robust style of play and heavy tackling, which he took to the All Blacks with Llanelli, should have been rewarded with his first international cap. David was not selected for the game, and Wales lost the game 19–16.

While with Llanelli, David was first selected to represent the Wales national team, in an encounter with France as part of the 1973 Five Nations Championship. Although Wales lost the game, David was reselected for the very next Wales game against Australia who were touring England and Wales. David was forced to pull out of the Wales team for the opening game of the 1974 Championship, against Scotland, through injury. This allowed Pontypool's Terry Cobner to take the open flanker position. Cobner was so successful in this role, that David was kept out of the position until Cobner himself was forced to stand down three years later.

In 1974, David was selected for the British Lions team to tour South Africa. David played in nine games, but was not selected for any of the Test games against the South African national team. On the tour David scored five tries against the regional teams, including two in the opening game against Western Transvaal.

In 1976, despite being a popular figure at Stradey Park, David rejoined Pontypridd. With Pontypridd, David won the Welsh Club Championship in the 1975/76 season, and regained his international place with Wales. His third cap was an encounter away to Ireland during the 1976 Five Nations Championship. Wales had already won the first two matches of the tournament over England and Scotland, and Wales then beat Ireland after a rapid turn around of fortunes thanks to the attacking flair of Phil Bennett. David was then selected for the final Wales' game of the Championship, the title decider at home to France. When Wales won the game 19–13, they not only took the Championship but also the Grand Slam. Although he was now a Grand Slam winning player, David never represented Wales under the union code again.

David continued to represent Pontypridd, and in the 1979/80 season he was given the captaincy of the senior team. While at Pontypridd he saw the club win three Welsh Club Championships, in 1976, 1978 and 1979. In 1981 David left Ponty, turning to the professional rugby league code. He joined Cardiff RLFC in August 1981 and on 8 November of that year he represented the Wales national rugby league team in a match against England at Cardiff. He played one final international in 1982, this time a home match to the Australian team.

=== International matches played ===
Wales (rugby union)

- Australia 1973
- France 1973, 1976
- Ireland 1976

Wales (rugby league)

- England 1981
- Australia 1982

== International Rugby League honours ==
David won caps for Wales while at Cardiff City (Bridgend) Blue Dragons in 1981 against England and in 1982 against Australia.

Before the start of the 1984/85 season, Cardiff City Blue Dragons relocated from Ninian Park in Cardiff, to Coychurch Road Ground in Bridgend, and were renamed Bridgend Blue Dragons.

== Bibliography ==
- Gate, Robert (1986). Gone North: Volume 1. Ripponden: R.E. Gate. ISBN 0-9511190-0-1.
- Jenkins, John M.; et al. (1991). Who's Who of Welsh International Rugby Players. Wrexham: Bridge Books. ISBN 1-872424-10-4.
- Smith, David; Williams, Gareth (1980). Fields of Praise: The Official History of The Welsh Rugby Union. Cardiff: University of Wales Press. ISBN 0-7083-0766-3.
- Starmer-Smith, Nigel (1977). The Barbarians. Macdonald & Jane's Publishers. ISBN 0-86007-552-4.
