= Fran Cotton =

British Lions & England rugby union international (born 1947)

- Born: Francis Edward Cotton; 3 January 1947 (age 79) Wigan, England
- Height: 1.89 m (6 ft 2 in)
- Weight: 105 kg (16 st 7 lb)
- School: Newton-le-Willows Grammar School
- University: Loughborough University
- Occupation: Businessman

Rugby union career
- Position: Prop
Amateur team(s)
Years	Team	Apps	(Points)
- Liverpool R.F.C.
- Loughborough Colleges
- Sale
- Coventry R.F.C.
- Correct as of 1 Sept 2006
Provincial / State sides
Years	Team	Apps	(Points)
–	Lancashire		
International career
Years	Team	Apps	(Points)
1971-81	England	31	(4)
1974, 1977, 1980	British Lions	7	(0)
- Correct as of 1 September 2006

Francis Edward Cotton (born 3 January 1947) is a former rugby union prop forward who played for England and the British Lions. His clubs included Coventry R.F.C. and Sale. A "fearsome" prop, he was primarily a tighthead but also played to a high level at loosehead, winning three Lions caps in 1977 on the left of the front row and the Grand Slam with England in 1980. After retiring, he remained in rugby administration and founded a clothing company. In 2007, Cotton returned to his former club Sale as a member of the club's board.

Cotton was born in Wigan, Lancashire, and went to Loughborough University to study physical education. Cotton was ahead of his time in terms of physical preparation. It was during these years that Cotton would win the Glengarth Sevens at Davenport RUFC, now renamed Stockport Rugby Club, along with Steve Smith and Clive Rees. Cotton made his England debut against Scotland in 1971 and played for them 31 times. He also captained the English team three times.

He represented the Lions on their tours to South Africa in 1974 – playing in all four Tests in the series victory – New Zealand in 1977 and South Africa in 1980 when chest pains sent him home early. It was during the game against the Junior All Blacks on the 1977 tour that the famous 'Mudman' image of Cotton, standing at number one at the front of a lineout while caked head-to-toe in mud, was taken. Captured by Colorsport's Colin Elsey, it became one of the most iconic images of rugby union. He considers the third test of the 1974 series the biggest and most violent game he was ever part of

Cotton was the Tour Manager for the 1997 British Lions tour to South Africa.

With Steve Smith he founded the clothing company Cotton Traders in 1987. In 2008 Cotton Traders was forced to pull out of Burma after an investigation by the Burma Campaign UK uncovered the company was sourcing clothing from Burma. Clothing exports generate significant income for the Burmese dictatorship.

== Charitable work ==
He is an honorary president of the rugby charity Wooden Spoon improving the lives of disadvantaged children and young people in Britain and Ireland.

Preceded by John Pullin	English national rugby union captain 1975	Succeeded by Tony Neary
