= Willie Duggan =

Irish rugby union footballer

- Born: William Patrick Duggan; 12 March 1950
- Died: 28 August 2017 (aged 67); Dunmore, outside Kilkenny, Ireland
- Occupation: businessman

William Patrick Duggan (12 March 1950 – 28 August 2017) was an Irish international rugby union player. He won 41 Irish caps, the first in 1975 and finished his international career in 1984 as captain. He toured New Zealand in 1977 with the British and Irish Lions, and at the time played club rugby for Blackrock College RFC, after commencing his career with Sunday's Well RFC in Cork.

== Career ==
On the pitch, Duggan was considered one of the leading No. 8s in Europe at the time, which was reflected in his being picked for the 1977 British Lions tour to New Zealand in which he played all four Tests. He was also regarded as one of the hard men of world rugby despite not enjoying training and being a heavy smoker. On one occasion he was smoking a cigarette as he ran onto the pitch to play against France, passing the cigarette to referee Allan Hosie, who was pictured holding the cigarette in the television coverage.

In January 1977, along with Wales' Geoff Wheel he became, the first player to be sent off in a Five Nations match. According to fellow player Moss Keane, Duggan did not consider himself to have been sent off, simply being asked by the referee "would he mind leaving the field", to which he replied "Sure not at all. I was buggered anyway".

His Leinster, Ireland and Lions colleague Phil Orr, then President of the IRFU, called him "a warrior. It was not just his physical presence. Willie had an extraordinary rugby brain, seeing problems and opportunities ahead of his team-mates and the opposition". He "lit up dressing-rooms and after-match gatherings with his own colourful, unique and vibrant wit".

== Personal life ==
He lived and worked in Kilkenny, where he ran the lighting shop that he took over from his father (Willie Duggan Lighting Ltd.).

On 28 August 2017, Duggan died from an aneurysm at his home in Dunmore, just outside Kilkenny city.
