= Gary Seear =

New Zealand rugby union player (1952–2018)

- Born: Gary Alan Seear; 19 February 1952 Dunedin, New Zealand
- Died: 8 February 2018 (aged 65) Christchurch, New Zealand
- Height: 1.92 m (6 ft 3 1/2 in)
- Weight: 97 kg (214 lb)
- School: Bayfield High School
- Occupation: Property sales consultant

Rugby union career
- Position: Number eight
Provincial / State sides
Years	Team	Apps	(Points)
1971–1982	Otago	119	
International career
Years	Team	Apps	(Points)
1972	New Zealand Colts	1	
1973–74	New Zealand Juniors	12	
1976–79	New Zealand	12	(11)

Gary Alan Seear (19 February 1952 – 8 February 2018) was a New Zealand rugby union player. A number eight later in his career, Seear made his debut for Otago as a 19-year-old as a lock. He captained the 1974 Junior All Blacks. Seear toured South Africa with the 1976 All Blacks but did not make an appearance until the following year where he played at number eight in two tests in France. He made further appearances in the 1978 home series against the Wallabies, the 1979 French tourists side, four more internationals in Britain and the sole test in Australia in 1979. He played in Italy for the Fracasso San Dona club during the 1979 season. He later worked as a commercial property sales consultant for worldwide real estate firm Colliers International in Christchurch.
