= Robbie Stuart =

- Born: Robert Locksdale Stuart; 9 January 1948 Napier, New Zealand
- Died: 26 June 2025 (aged 77)
- Height: 1.91 m (6 ft 3 in)
- Weight: 103 kg (227 lb)
- School: Napier Boys' High School

Rugby union career
- Positions: Lock; prop
Provincial / State sides
Years	Team	Apps	(Points)
1967–1980	Hawke's Bay	116	(35)
International career
Years	Team	Apps	(Points)
1977	New Zealand	1	(0)
Coaching career
- Years: Team
- 1984–1985: Hawke's Bay

Robert Locksdale Stuart (9 January 1948 – 26 June 2025) was a New Zealand rugby union player. A lock, Stuart represented Hawke's Bay at a provincial level, and was a member of the New Zealand national side, the All Blacks, on their 1977 tour of Italy and France. He played six matches for the All Blacks including one international, and captained the team in two matches against French selections.

Stuart played for Hawke's Bay until 1980, including a record 84 matches as captain. He coached the team from 1984 to 1985 and, in 2018, was inducted into the Central Hawke's Bay Sports Hall of Fame.

Stuart died on 26 June 2025, at the age of 77.
