= Duncan Robertson =

New Zealand international rugby union player

- Born: Duncan John Robertson; 6 February 1947 (age 79) Dunedin, New Zealand
- Height: 1.78 m (5 ft 10 in)
- Weight: 78 kg (172 lb)
- School: King Edward Technical College

Rugby union career
- Position(s): First five-eighth Second five-eighth Fullback
Provincial / State sides
Years	Team	Apps	(Points)
1966–1978	Otago	104	
International career
Years	Team	Apps	(Points)
1974–1977	New Zealand	10	(8)

Duncan John Robertson (born 6 February 1947) is a former New Zealand rugby union player. He represented Otago at a provincial level, making 104 appearances and playing most of his games at second five-eighth. Robertson was a member of the New Zealand national side, the All Blacks, from 1973 to 1977, playing mostly as a first five-eighth, but also as a fullback towards the end of his career. He played 30 matches for the All Blacks including 10 internationals.
