= Brynmor Williams =

Wales dual-code international rugby footballer

Brynmor Williams MBE
- Born: David Brynmor Williams; 29 October 1951 (age 75) Cardigan, Wales
- Height: 178 cm (5 ft 10 in)
- Weight: 79 kg (12 st 6 lb)
- School: Ysgol Gynradd Penparc; Cardigan Grammar School
- University: Cardiff College of Education
- Notable relative(s): Gwynfor Williams, Lloyd Williams, Tom Williams

Rugby union career
- Position: Scrum-half
Senior career
Years	Team	Apps	(Points)
1972-1980	Cardiff RFC	98	(132)
1977–1979	Newport RFC	30	(19)
1979-1982	Swansea RFC	54	(142)
International career
Years	Team	Apps	(Points)
1977	British Lions	3	(0)
1978–1981	Wales	3	
- Rugby league career

Playing information
- Position: Scrum-half, Halfback
Club
Years	Team	Pld	T	G	FG	P
1982–84	Cardiff Blue Dragons	26	6			21
1984	Huyton	9	2			8
	Total	35	8	0	0	29
Representative
Years	Team	Pld	T	G	FG	P
1982	Wales	1				3

David Brynmor Williams MBE (born 29 October 1951) is a Welsh former rugby union and rugby league player. A dual-code international, he won three caps for the British Lions and three for Wales in rugby union, and one in rugby league for Wales.

A scrum-half, he played rugby union for Cardiff, Newport and Swansea at club level, and in rugby league for Cardiff City Blue Dragons, also as a scrum-half.

Williams was born in Cardigan, and was educated at Ysgol Gynradd Penparc, Cardigan Grammar School and Cardiff College of Education. He is the elder brother of another rugby player, Gwynfor Williams. His sons, Lloyd and Tom, are professional rugby players. During his rugby career, Williams was manager of a building society in Ammanford.

In 1977 he toured New Zealand with the British and Irish Lions when he had yet to be capped by Wales. He made his international debut in the first test of the series against New Zealand at Athletic Park, Wellington, in June 1977 and went on to play in the first three tests before being replaced due to injury during the third. He made his Wales debut against Australia at Ballymore, Brisbane in June 1978 and scored a try on his debut. His only two other appearances for Wales came in the 1981 Five Nations championship. Williams' rugby union appearances were limited by the presence of first Gareth Edwards, and then Terry Holmes in the same club and national teams.

Williams is Welsh-speaking and is sometimes called upon as a pundit in the Welsh-language media. In 2016 Williams took up the voluntary role as Chair of Fields in Trust Cymru, a charity dedicated to protecting outdoor space for play, sport and recreation.

Williams was appointed Member of the Order of the British Empire (MBE) in the 2022 Birthday Honours for services to sport and charity in Wales.

== International honours ==
Brynmor Williams won a cap for Wales (RL) while at Cardiff City Blue Dragons 1982 1-cap 1-try 3-points.

== Note ==
Before the start of the 1984/85 season, Cardiff City Blue Dragons relocated from Ninian Park in Cardiff, to Coychurch Road Ground in Bridgend, and were renamed Bridgend Blue Dragons.
