= Stu Wilson =

New Zealand rugby union player (1954–2025)

- Full name: Stuart Sinclair Wilson
- Born: 22 July 1954 Gore, New Zealand
- Died: 8 June 2025 (aged 70) Tauranga, New Zealand
- Height: 1.83 m (6 ft 0 in)
- Weight: 86 kg (190 lb)
- School: Wairarapa College

Rugby union career
- Positions: Wing; centre
Provincial / State sides
Years	Team	Apps	(Points)
1975–1984	Wellington	89	(216)
International career
Years	Team	Apps	(Points)
1976–1983	New Zealand	34	(76)

Stuart Sinclair Wilson (22 July 1954 – 8 June 2025) was a New Zealand rugby union player. He played as a wing or centre for Wellington from 1973 to 1983 and the New Zealand national team, the All Blacks, from 1976 to 1983. He was notably a member of the 1978 Grand Slam team that defeated all four Home Unions, and also captaining the New Zealand national team on the 1983 end of season tour.

== Early life ==
Wilson was born on 22 July 1954 in Gore, but moved to Masterton as a child and was educated at Wairarapa College where he excelled in athletics, cricket, golf, hockey, and tennis as well as playing 1st XV rugby. He also played under-20 and under-23 representative cricket for Wellington.

== Rugby career ==
In 1973 Wilson made the New Zealand Colts team and was coached by Jack Gleeson, who would later coach him in the All Blacks.

Wilson debuted for New Zealand on the 1976 tour of Argentina, becoming All Black number 772. Wilson went on the end of season tour to Italy and France, scoring a try while playing against the latter. He played in the tests at the Stadium de Toulouse (lost 13–18) and the Parc des Princes (won 15–3) and scored a try in the second test.

In 1978 Wilson was a member of the 1978 Grand Slam team which beat all four Home Unions. He scored a try in the 13–12 win over Wales. In June 1981, Wilson scored 3 tries against Scotland in the 2nd test of their New Zealand tour at Eden Park. Against the 1981 South African tourists he scored a try in the 1st test at Lancaster Park (won 14–9) and in the 3rd test at Eden Park (won 25–22).

In the Third test against the 1983 Lions, Wilson scored a try to equal the New Zealand record of 16 test tries held by Ian Kirkpatrick. In the Fourth test at Eden Park he scored 3 tries taking his total to 19. Wilson captained the national team on the 1983 end of season tour during which the All Blacks drew 25–25 with Scotland but lost 9–15 to England.

Wilson formed a formidable combination with Bernie Fraser on the other wing for both Wellington and the All Blacks. Others regular team-mates for Wellington and the All Blacks were Allan Hewson at fullback and Murray Mexted at No8. Although usually a Wing he sometimes played Centre. Wilson scored:

- 19 tries (76 points) in his 34 tests
- 50 tries (200 points) in all games for his country
- 54 tries (216 points) in 89 matches for Wellington

He was a key member of the Wellington team which won the 1978 and 1981 First division provincial rugby titles and the Ranfurly Shield in 1981.

== Retirement and death ==
Although still in his prime, Wilson retired from the game in 1984 after a book about him and Bernie Fraser, Ebony & Ivory: The Stu Wilson, Bernie Fraser Story, authored by Alex Veysey, was published. At that time, rugby players were not allowed to profit from books about their rugby careers under strict amateurism rules, and Fraser and Wilson were banned from playing for seven years.

Following retirement, Wilson became a rugby and sports commentator, working on television and radio. This included co-presenting an American football programme on TV3. He also worked as a real estate agent. In 2021, Wilson began working part-time as an orderly at Tauranga Hospital, partly to "get out of the house" in his retirement, but also to give back to the hospital where he received a stent in a cardiac artery.

Wilson's daughter, Livvy Wilson, is an accomplished sprinter and has medalled in the 100 and 200 m at the New Zealand Athletics Championships. She has won gold with the Auckland 4 × 100 metres relay team. As a member of the New Zealand women's 4 × 100 metres relay team, she has competed internationally and was in the team that broke the New Zealand record on 4 June 2022 at a pre-Oceania meeting at Mackay, Queensland.

Wilson died at Tauranga on 8 June 2025, at the age of 70. Former rugby teammate Murray Mexted had coffee with Wilson on the day of Wilson's death. Mexted said that Wilson was "just his normal self, chirpy with a spring in his step", hence the death was unexpected.
