= Ken Stewart (rugby union) =

New Zealand rugby union player

- Born: Kenneth William Stewart; 3 January 1953 (age 73) Gore, New Zealand
- Height: 1.83 m (6 ft 0 in)
- Weight: 97 kg (214 lb)
- School: Otago Boys' High School

Rugby union career
- Position: Flanker
Provincial / State sides
Years	Team	Apps	(Points)
1971–81	Southland	73	
International career
Years	Team	Apps	(Points)
1972–81	New Zealand	13	(0)

Kenneth William Stewart (born 3 January 1953) is a former New Zealand rugby union player. A flanker, Stewart represented Southland at a provincial level, and was a member of the New Zealand national side, the All Blacks, from 1972 to 1981. He played 55 matches for the All Blacks including 13 internationals.
