= John Black (rugby union) =

- Born: John Edwin Black; 25 July 1951 (age 75) Timaru, New Zealand
- Height: 1.83 m (6 ft 0 in)
- Weight: 93 kg (205 lb)
- School: Timaru Boys' High School
- University: University of Canterbury

Rugby union career
- Position: Hooker
Provincial / State sides
Years	Team	Apps	(Points)
1973–80	Canterbury		
International career
Years	Team	Apps	(Points)
1976–80	New Zealand	3	(0)

John Edwin Black (born 25 July 1951) is a former New Zealand rugby union player. A hooker, Black represented Canterbury at a provincial level, and was a member of the New Zealand national side, the All Blacks, from 1976 to 1980. He played 26 matches for the All Blacks including three internationals.
