= Jack Gleeson (rugby union) =

- Born: Jack Gleeson New Zealand
- Died: 1979

Rugby union career
Coaching career
- Years: Team
- 1975–1976: New Zealand national under-21 rugby union team
- 1977–1978: New Zealand

Jack Gleeson (died November 1979) was a New Zealand rugby union team coach.

== Career ==
Gleeson coached the New Zealand national under-21 rugby union team from 1975 to 1976 and the New Zealand national rugby union team (the All Blacks) from 1977 to 1978.

He was the coach (officially titled assistant manager) for the 1978 New Zealand rugby union tour of Britain and Ireland, where the All Blacks completed their first Grand Slam of four international match wins on tour of Britain and Ireland – the Rothmans Rugby Yearbook described him as a "shrewd and effective coach".

== Death ==
Gleeson died from cancer in 1979.

Sporting positions
Preceded by JJ Stewart	All Blacks coach 1977—1978	Succeeded by Eric Watson
