= Bill Bush =

Bill Bush MNZM
- Born: William Kingita Te Pohe Bush; 24 January 1949 (age 77) Napier, New Zealand
- Height: 1.85 m (6 ft 1 in)
- Weight: 103 kg (227 lb)
- School: Whakatane High School

Rugby union career
- Position: Prop
Provincial / State sides
Years	Team	Apps	(Points)
1971–82	Canterbury		
International career
Years	Team	Apps	(Points)
1973–82	New Zealand Māori		
1974–79	New Zealand	12	(0)

William Kingita Te Pohe Bush MNZM (born 24 January 1949) is a former New Zealand rugby union player. A prop, Bush represented Canterbury at a provincial level, and was a member of the New Zealand national side, the All Blacks, from 1974 to 1979. He played 37 matches for the All Blacks including 12 internationals. He also represented, coached and selected for Māori All Blacks.

In the 1996 Queen's Birthday Honours, Bush was appointed a Member of the New Zealand Order of Merit, for services to rugby. In 2021 he was made a life member of New Zealand Māori Rugby Board.

== Personal life ==
Bush is a New Zealander of Māori descent (Ngāti Hineuru and Te Whānau-ā-Apanui descent).

In October 2022 Bush was engaged to be the bus driver for the All Black squad.

Awards
Preceded by Tane Norton	Tom French Memorial; Māori rugby union player of the year 1975	Succeeded by Kent Lambert
