= Lyn Jaffray =

- Born: John Lyndon Jaffray; 17 April 1950 (age 76) Dunedin, New Zealand
- Height: 1.76 m (5 ft 9 in)
- Weight: 81 kg (179 lb)
- School: Kaikorai Valley High School
- Notable relative: Merv Jaffray (brother)

Rugby union career
- Position(s): First five-eighth Second five-eighth
Provincial / State sides
Years	Team	Apps	(Points)
1970–78	Otago	84	(55)
1979	South Canterbury	13	(4)
International career
Years	Team	Apps	(Points)
1972–79	New Zealand	7	(4)

John Lyndon Jaffray (born 17 April 1950) is a former New Zealand rugby union player. A first or second five-eighth, Jaffray represented Otago and South Canterbury at a provincial level, and was a member of the New Zealand national side, the All Blacks, between 1972 and 1979. He played 23 matches for the All Blacks including seven internationals.
