= Bernie Fraser (rugby union) =

New Zealand rugby union player

- Born: 21 July 1953 (age 73) Lautoka, Fiji
- Height: 1.78 m (5 ft 10 in)
- Weight: 83 kg (183 lb)

Rugby union career
- Position: Wing
Provincial / State sides
Years	Team	Apps	(Points)
1975-86	Wellington	124	(420)
International career
Years	Team	Apps	(Points)
1979–1984	New Zealand	23	(24)

Bernard Gabriel Fraser (born 21 July 1953) is a New Zealand former rugby union player. He played 124 games for Wellington, and 55 games, including 23 test matches, for New Zealand.

== Personal life ==
Fraser was born in Lautoka, Fiji; he is of Fijian descent with Scottish and Portuguese ancestry. He attended St Paul's College in Auckland. He is the father of Grammy award-winner singer and songwriter Brooke Fraser and the godfather of lawyer Greg King's eldest daughter, Pippa.

== Books ==
- Ebony and Ivory, 1984 (with Stu Wilson)
