= John Spiers (rugby union) =

New Zealand rugby union player

- Born: John Edmunde Spiers; 4 August 1947 (age 79) Ōtāhuhu, New Zealand
- Height: 1.85 m (6 ft 1 in)
- Weight: 106 kg (234 lb)
- School: Onewhero District High School

Rugby union career
- Position: Prop
Provincial / State sides
Years	Team	Apps	(Points)
1970–82	Counties	153	
International career
Years	Team	Apps	(Points)
1976, 1979–81	New Zealand	5	(0)

John Edmunde Spiers (born 4 August 1947) is a former New Zealand rugby union player. A prop, Spiers represented Counties at a provincial level, and was a member of the New Zealand national side, the All Blacks, between 1976 and 1981. He played 28 matches for the All Blacks including five internationals.
