= Brian McKechnie =

New Zealand rugby player and cricketer (born 1953)

- Born: Brian John McKechnie; 6 November 1953 (age 73) Gore, New Zealand
- Height: 1.73 m (5 ft 8 in)
- Weight: 79 kg (12 st 6 lb)
- School: Southland Boys' High School

Rugby union career
- Position(s): First five-eighth, fullback
Amateur team(s)
Years	Team	Apps	(Points)
- Invercargill Star
- Correct as of 23 January 2007
Provincial / State sides
Years	Team	Apps	(Points)
- Southland
- Correct as of 23 January 2007
International career
Years	Team	Apps	(Points)
1977–1981	New Zealand	26 [10 tests]	((148 [2t, 22c, 28p, 4dg]))
- Correct as of 23 January 2007
- Cricket career

Cricket information
- Batting: Right-handed
- Bowling: Right-arm fast-medium

International information
- National side: New Zealand (1975–1981)
- ODI debut (cap 21): 7 June 1975 v East Africa
- Last ODI: 1 February 1981 v Australia

Domestic team information
- Years: Team
- 1971/72–1985/86: Otago
- 1971/72–1986/87: Southland

Career statistics
Competition	ODI	FC	LA
Matches	14	50	26
Runs scored	54	1,169	168
Batting average	13.50	13.26	14.00
100s/50s	0/0	0/2	0/0
Top score	27	51	32
Balls bowled	818	8,154	1,450
Wickets	19	100	32
Bowling average	26.05	30.65	24.93
5 wickets in innings	0	0	0
10 wickets in match	0	0	0
Best bowling	3/23	4/24	3/23
Catches/stumpings	2/–	24/–	3/–
- Source: Cricinfo, 2 May 2017

Brian John McKechnie (born 6 November 1953) is a former "double All Black" - representing New Zealand in both rugby union and cricket. He was born at Gore in Southland and educated at Southland Boys' High School.

== Rugby career ==
He played 26 matches for the All Blacks as a first five-eighth and fullback, most memorably being the player to kick the winning penalty goal against Wales in 1978 when Andy Haden dived out off a lineout near full-time and was apparently awarded a penalty (the referee later said the penalty was for a completely separate incident and was clearly visible in video footage). Wales were leading 12-10 before McKechnie's penalty and were hoping to secure the first Welsh victory against the All Blacks in 25 years. The dive and subsequent penalty gave the All Blacks victory and would secure the "Grand Slam" for the All Blacks against the home country unions.

== Cricketing career ==
As a cricketer, McKechnie was an economical right-arm pace bowler and useful lower-order batsman who played 14 one day games for the New Zealand national cricket team, including in the 1975 and 1979 World Cup tournaments in England. His last match for New Zealand was the infamous "underarm match" against Australia in 1981, when McKechnie was the batsman who faced Trevor Chappell's underarm delivery in the final ball of the match, throwing his bat away in disgust after blocking the delivery. McKechnie represented Otago in top-level domestic competitions from 1971–72 to 1985–86 and played Hawke Cup cricket for Southland until 1986–87. He later served on the national selection panel.

== Beyond sports ==
With Lynn McConnell, he wrote McKechnie: Double All Black: An Autobiography (Craigs, Invercargill) in 1983.
