= Mike Burgoyne (rugby union) =

- Born: Michael Martin Burgoyne; 27 March 1951 Kaitaia, New Zealand
- Died: 22 November 2016 (aged 65) Yanuca, Fiji
- Height: 1.88 m (6 ft 2 in)
- Weight: 86 kg (190 lb)
- School: Kaitaia College

Rugby union career
- Position: Flanker
Provincial / State sides
Years	Team	Apps	(Points)
1975–81	North Auckland	31	
International career
Years	Team	Apps	(Points)
1975, 1979	New Zealand Māori	8	
1979	New Zealand	0	(0)

Michael Martin Burgoyne (27 March 1951 – 22 November 2016) was a New Zealand rugby union player. A flanker, Burgoyne represented North Auckland at a provincial level, and was a member of the New Zealand national side, the All Blacks, in 1979. He played six matches for the All Blacks including games against Argentina and Italy, but neither was recognised as a full international by the New Zealand Rugby Union. Of Ngāti Kahu descent, Burgoyne made eight appearances for New Zealand Māori between 1975 and 1979.

Burgoyne died suddenly in 2016 while on the Fijian island of Yanuca.
