= Lawrie Knight =

- Born: Lawrence Gibb Knight; 24 September 1949 (age 77) Auckland, New Zealand
- Height: 1.91 m (6 ft 3 in)
- Weight: 101 kg (223 lb)
- School: Auckland Grammar School
- University: University of Auckland
- Notable relative(s): Laurie Knight (father); Arthur Knight (uncle)
- Occupation: Doctor

Rugby union career
- Position(s): Lock; Loose forward
Provincial / State sides
| Years | Team | Apps | (Points) |
| 1970–1974 | Auckland | 33 | (24) |
| 1975–1977 | Poverty Bay | 22 | (44) |
International career
| Years | Team | Apps | (Points) |
| 1974–1977 | New Zealand | 6 | (4) |

Lawrence Gibb Knight (born 24 September 1949) is a former New Zealand rugby union player. A lock and loose forward, Knight represented Auckland and Poverty Bay at a provincial level, and was a member of the New Zealand national side, the All Blacks, from 1974 to 1977. He played 35 matches for the All Blacks including six internationals.

Knight trained as a medical doctor. After completing his All Black career, he went to Paris to undertake further study and while there played rugby for the Paris Université Club. He later lived and worked in South Africa, practising medicine in Johannesburg, before returning to New Zealand in the late 1990s.

From 2010 to 2013, Knight served as president of the Auckland Rugby Union.
