= Barry Thompson (rugby union) =

- Born: Barry Alan Thompson; 28 December 1947 Oxford, New Zealand
- Died: 13 June 2006 (aged 58) Oxford, New Zealand
- Height: 1.83 m (6 ft 0 in)
- Weight: 103 kg (227 lb)
- School: Rangiora High School

Rugby union career
- Position: Prop
Provincial / State sides
Years	Team	Apps	(Points)
1970–79	Canterbury	42	
International career
Years	Team	Apps	(Points)
1979	New Zealand	0	(0)

Barry Alan Thompson (28 December 1947 – 13 June 2006) was a New Zealand rugby union player. A prop, Thompson represented Canterbury at a provincial level, and was a member of the New Zealand national side, the All Blacks, in 1979. He played eight matches for the All Blacks including two games against Argentina and one against Italy, but they were not recognised as full internationals by the New Zealand Rugby Union. He later served on the Waimakariri District Council from 1992 to 2001.
