= Gary Cunningham (rugby union) =

- Born: Gary Richard Cunningham; 12 May 1955 (age 71) Auckland, New Zealand
- Height: 1.83 m (6 ft 0 in)
- Weight: 77 kg (170 lb)
- School: Takapuna Grammar School

Rugby union career
- Position(s): Wing, centre
Provincial / State sides
Years	Team	Apps	(Points)
1978–84	Auckland	83	
1985–86	North Harbour	10	
International career
Years	Team	Apps	(Points)
1979–80	New Zealand	5	(0)

Gary Richard Cunningham (born 12 May 1955) is a former New Zealand rugby union player. A wing and centre, Cunningham represented Auckland and North Harbour at a provincial level, and was a member of the New Zealand national side, the All Blacks, in 1979 and 1980. He played 17 matches for the All Blacks including five internationals.
