= Andy Haden =

New Zealand rugby union player (1950–2020)

- Born: Andrew Maxwell Haden; 26 September 1950 Wanganui, New Zealand
- Died: 29 July 2020 (aged 69) Auckland, New Zealand
- Height: 1.99 m (6 ft 6 in)
- Weight: 112 kg (247 lb)
- School: Wanganui Boys' College

Rugby union career
- Position: Lock
International career
Years	Team	Apps	(Points)
1972–1985	New Zealand	41	(8)

Andrew Maxwell Haden (26 September 1950 – 29 July 2020) was a New Zealand rugby union player and All Black captain. He played at lock for Auckland and for New Zealand from 1972 until 1985. He also played club rugby for Ponsonby RFC in Auckland and for clubs in the United Kingdom and Italy.

== Life and career ==
Andy Haden was born in Whanganui on 26 September 1950 and attended Wanganui Boys' College.

Haden moved to Auckland and joined Ponsonby RFC. In 1971 he played for the Auckland Colts and also made his senior provincial debut for Auckland, playing 2 senior games that season. He would go on to play 157 provincial games scoring 12 tries (48 points). He also played eight games for the New Zealand Juniors in 1972 and many appearances for the North Island team in the Interisland match, captaining them in 1984.

== All Black career ==
Andy Haden made his All Black debut in 1972 against New York Metropolitan on the 1972–73 tour of Britain, Ireland, France and North America. However, his Test debut was not until 1977 against the British Lions. He went on to make 41 Test appearances and scoring two tries. Of those 41 appearances, 8 were as captain of the All Blacks. Haden was noted for his powerful scrummage skills and for his imposing presence at the lineout.

Haden also played club rugby for Harlequins in London and Algida Rome in Italy. Off the field, he published his autobiography, Boots ’n All, in 1983. By receiving royalties from the book, he ostensibly tested the sport's strict amateurism rules in force back then. He ultimately prevailed, however, by claiming that being a writer was his profession.

Haden was selected as one of the “Five players of the year” for the 1984 and 1985 seasons, in the Rugby Almanack of New Zealand.

Haden was a controversial player, who was accused of cheating and unsporting conduct. The most infamous occurrence of this happened in a match against Wales at Cardiff Arms Park in 1978. The score was 12–10 in Wales's favour, when Haden and another New Zealand player, Frank Oliver, fell to the ground as if pushed during a lineout after the ball had been thrown in. The referee awarded a penalty in the dying moments of the match, which Brian McKechnie kicked, winning the game for New Zealand. Later, Welsh legend J. P. R. Williams wrote that Haden should have been sent off. Despite the controversy however, the referee subsequently stated that the penalty had actually been awarded for an actual infringement against Oliver and not the Haden 'dive' as was thought. Haden did not, however, deny that the attempts to cheat the referee were pre-planned, something also confirmed by his captain Graham Mourie. The match happened on the same day as the annual 'Miss World' competition, which prompted Welsh cartoonist Gren to create a picture of the 'Miss World' event, but with Miss New Zealand lying on the floor, pretending to have been pushed. Haden made his last Test appearance in 1985 against Argentina.

== Later years ==
Haden was an agent for various celebrities, including Rachel Hunter. He was given the honorary position of Rugby World Cup Ambassador in 2010, but resigned the post after making controversial statements about a racial quota he alleged the Crusaders to be operating, calling Polynesians "darkies", and then suggesting women raped by sports stars may be partly to blame.

In 2003, Haden announced that he was beginning chemotherapy for chronic lymphocytic leukaemia. He overcame this bout of illness, but in February 2020 was diagnosed with lymphoma. He consequently died of lymphoma on 29 July 2020, at his home in Auckland. He was 69 years old.
