= Vance Stewart =

- Born: Vance Edmund Stewart; 28 October 1948 (age 78) Christchurch, New Zealand
- Height: 1.91 m (6 ft 3 in)
- Weight: 99 kg (218 lb)
- School: St Bede's College

Rugby union career
- Position: Lock
Provincial / State sides
Years	Team	Apps	(Points)
1971–1980	Canterbury	78	
International career
Years	Team	Apps	(Points)
1976–1979	New Zealand	0	(0)
1974–1979	New Zealand Māori	17	
Coaching career
- Years: Team
- 1993–1996: Canterbury
- 1996: Crusaders

Vance Edmund Stewart (born 28 October 1948) is a former New Zealand rugby union player and coach. A lock, Stewart represented Canterbury at a provincial level, and was a member of the New Zealand national side, the All Blacks, in 1976 and 1979. He played 12 matches for the All Blacks but did not appear in any official tests. He went on to coach Canterbury from 1993 to 1996, and was the inaugural Crusaders coach in 1996.

Stewart was born in Christchurch on 28 October 1948, the son of Vance and Uta Stewart, and was educated at St Bede's College.

Awards
Preceded by Eddie Dunn	Tom French Memorial; Māori rugby union player of the year 1979	Succeeded by Hika Reid
