= Doug Bruce (rugby union) =

- Born: Oliver Douglas Bruce; 23 May 1947 (age 79) Dunedin, New Zealand
- Height: 1.78 m (5 ft 10 in)
- Weight: 74 kg (163 lb)
- School: Ashburton High School

Rugby union career
- Position: First five-eighth
Provincial / State sides
Years	Team	Apps	(Points)
1967–69	Mid Canterbury		
1970–78	Canterbury		
International career
Years	Team	Apps	(Points)
1974–78	New Zealand	14	(15)
Coaching career
- Years: Team
- 1987–88: Canterbury

Oliver Douglas Bruce (born 23 May 1947) is a former New Zealand rugby union player and coach. A first five-eighth, Bruce represented Mid Canterbury and Canterbury at a provincial level, and was a member of the New Zealand national side, the All Blacks, from 1974 to 1978. He played 41 matches for the All Blacks including 14 internationals. He went on to be the assistant coach of Canterbury between 1982 and 1985, and the coach of that side from 1987 to 1988.
