= Eddie Dunn (rugby union) =

- Born: Edward James Dunn; 19 January 1955 (age 71) Te Kōpuru, New Zealand
- Height: 1.70 m (5 ft 7 in)
- Weight: 72 kg (159 lb)
- School: Dargaville High School
- Notable relative: Ian Dunn (brother)

Rugby union career
- Position: First five-eighth
Provincial / State sides
Years	Team	Apps	(Points)
1973, 1977–87	North Auckland	107	
International career
Years	Team	Apps	(Points)
1974–75	New Zealand Colts		
1976–82	New Zealand Māori		
1978–81	New Zealand	2	(4)

Edward James Dunn (born 19 January 1955) is a former New Zealand rugby union player. A first five-eighth, Dunn represented North Auckland at a provincial level, and was a member of the New Zealand national side, the All Blacks, between 1978 and 1981. He played 20 matches for the All Blacks including two official internationals.

Awards
Preceded by Bill Osborne	Tom French Memorial; Māori rugby union player of the year 1978	Succeeded by Vance Stewart
