= John Fleming (rugby union) =

- Born: John Kingsley Fleming; 2 May 1953 (age 73) Auckland, New Zealand
- Height: 1.96 m (6 ft 5 in)
- Weight: 102 kg (225 lb)
- School: Auckland Grammar School

Rugby union career
- Position: Lock
Provincial / State sides
Years	Team	Apps	(Points)
1975–79	Wellington		
1980–84	Waikato	30	
International career
Years	Team	Apps	(Points)
1978–80	New Zealand	5	(4)
Coaching career
- Years: Team
- Thames Valley

John Kingsley Fleming (born 2 May 1953) is a former New Zealand rugby union player. A lock, Fleming represented Wellington and Waikato at a provincial level, and was a member of the New Zealand national side, the All Blacks, from 1978 to 1980. He played 35 matches for the All Blacks including five internationals.
