= Graham Mourie =

Graham Mourie MBE
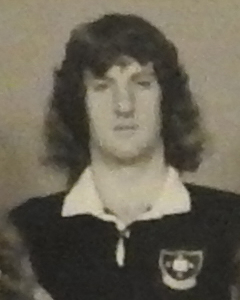
- Mourie in 1973
- Born: Graham Neil Kenneth Mourie; 8 September 1952 (age 74) Ōpunake, New Zealand
- Height: 183 cm (6 ft 0 in)
- Weight: 89 kg (196 lb; 14 st 0 lb)
- School: New Plymouth Boys' High School
- University: Victoria University of Wellington

Rugby union career
- Position: Flanker
Senior career
Years	Team	Apps	(Points)
1975–1982	Taranaki	104	(100)
International career
Years	Team	Apps	(Points)
1975	Junior All Blacks	2	(8)
1976–1982	New Zealand	61	(64)
Coaching career
- Years: Team
- 1998–1999: Wellington
- 2000–2002: Hurricanes

Graham Neil Kenneth Mourie MBE (born 8 September 1952) is a New Zealand former rugby union player and coach.

A flanker, he is considered one of the great All Black captains, leading the team in the late 1970s and early 1980s. He was first selected for the All Blacks in 1976, captaining a second-string New Zealand team that toured South America. He was selected again for the All Blacks against the touring British Lions in 1977, and captained the side in France later that year, replacing Tane Norton as captain.

He was later coach of the Hurricanes.

== Early life ==
Born in Taranaki, he captained his province. He attended Opunake High School and was in the 1st XV before he attended New Plymouth Boys' High School. He made the school's 1st XV but never captained it.

== Rugby career ==
He played a total of 61 matches (57 as captain) for the All Blacks until 1982. He captained the All Blacks on their historic Grand Slam tour of Britain and Ireland in 1978.

In 1981, Mourie made himself unavailable for selection during the controversial Springbok Tour of New Zealand. Mourie has said that he has no regrets about his decision not to play against the Springboks in 1981, noting that "You have got to be able to look at yourself in the mirror - look yourself in the eye and say that is the right thing to do."

He returned as captain later that year for the tour of Romania and France.

Mourie also played for the Barbarians and for a World XV.

He retired from playing in 1982 and together with Ron Palenski penned his autobiography. Because he openly accepted royalties from book sales and declared himself 'professional' - to challenge the existing rules around amateurism, he was banned from coaching, playing or administering the game for 10 years. He returned to coach the Opunake senior team, his club side, after the ban ended.

He was also instrumental in setting up the Coastal rugby club in 1995 and became its first coach.

=== Coaching ===
Mourie's first taste of first-class coaching was with Wellington before he took over from Frank Oliver as head coach of the Hurricanes in 2000. He resigned in June 2002 at the conclusion of the season which was labelled "disappointing" after the team finished 9th.

== Recognition ==
Mourie was named overall sportsman of the Year in the Taranaki Sports Awards in 1977. In the 1981 Queen's Birthday Honours, Mourie was appointed a Member of the Order of the British Empire, for services to rugby.

He was inducted into the World Rugby Hall of Fame in 2014 and the New Zealand Sports Hall of Fame in 1996. He was inducted into the Taranaki Sports Hall of Fame in 2015.

He was made a Life Member of the Taranaki Rugby Football Union in 2018 and became its Patron in July 2019.

== Business career ==
Mourie worked as a farmer and in farming industry roles.

Sporting positions
Preceded by Tane Norton	All Blacks captain 1977–1982	Succeeded by Andy Dalton
