= Peter Sloane =

NZ international rugby union player

- Born: Peter Henry Sloane; 10 September 1948 (age 78) Whangārei, New Zealand
- Height: 1.83 m (6 ft 0 in)
- Weight: 93 kg (205 lb)
- School: Whangārei Boys' High School

Rugby union career
- Position: Hooker
Provincial / State sides
Years	Team	Apps	(Points)
1972–1983	North Auckland	147	
International career
Years	Team	Apps	(Points)
1973–1979	New Zealand	1	(0)
Coaching career
- Years: Team
- 2000–2001: Highlanders
- 2002–2005: Blues
- 2007: Northampton
- 2008–2011: Kintetsu Liners

Peter Henry Sloane (born 10 September 1948) is a New Zealand rugby union coach and former player. A hooker, Sloane represented North Auckland from 1972 to 1983, and made 15 appearances for the New Zealand national team, the All Blacks, including one test match, between 1973 and 1979. He has also been a coach, acting as assistant All Blacks coach to John Hart from 1998 to 1999, assistant Crusaders coach from 1997 to 1999, Highlanders head coach in 2000 and 2001, and Blues head coach between 2002 and 2005. During his time in Auckland he led the Blues to the 2003 Super 12 championship.

In April 2006, Sloane joined the coaching staff at English rugby club Northampton Saints. Initially employed as forwards coach, he was briefly appointed head coach in 2007, but left the club the same year when Jim Mallinder was announced as head coach.

In 2008, he joined Japanese Top League club, Kintetsu Liners, as head coach. In 2010 he led Kintetsu Liners to its best finish in the club's history in the Top League: 9th in the 14 team competition. Sloane returned to New Zealand in 2011 at the end of his three-year contract.
