= Richard Wilson (rugby union) =

New Zealand rugby union player

- Born: Richard George Wilson; 19 May 1953 (age 73) Leeston, New Zealand
- Height: 1.84 m (6 ft 0 in)
- Weight: 90 kg (200 lb)
- School: St Andrew's College

Rugby union career
- Position: Fullback
Provincial / State sides
Years	Team	Apps	(Points)
1973–80	Canterbury	48	
International career
Years	Team	Apps	(Points)
1976–80	New Zealand	2	(10)

Richard George Wilson (born 19 May 1953) is a former New Zealand rugby union player. A fullback, Wilson represented Canterbury at a provincial level, and was a member of the New Zealand national side, the All Blacks, from 1976 to 1980. He played 25 matches for the All Blacks including two full internationals.
