= Bill Osborne =

New Zealand rugby union player (born 1955)

- Born: William Michael Osborne; 24 April 1955 (age 71) Whanganui, New Zealand
- Height: 1.78 m (5 ft 10 in)
- Weight: 82 kg (181 lb)
- School: Wanganui High School
- Notable relative: Glen Osborne (nephew)

Rugby union career
- Position: Second five-eighth, centre
Provincial / State sides
Years	Team	Apps	(Points)
1973–84	Wanganui	72	(59)
1985-86	Waikato	10	(0)
International career
Years	Team	Apps	(Points)
1974	NZ Colts	4	(0)
1975–82	New Zealand	16	(0)
1975-85	New Zealand Māori	8	(4)

William Michael Osborne (born 24 April 1955) is a former New Zealand rugby union player. A second five-eighth and centre, Osborne represented Wanganui and Waikato at a provincial level. Started his club career with the local Kaierau Rugby Union Club in Wanganui. He was a member of the New Zealand national side, the All Blacks, between 1975 and 1982, playing 48 matches including 16 internationals.

== Post rugby playing career ==
After retiring from playing rugby Osborne has had a successful business career, including:

- group manager of New Zealand Post
- CEO of Quotable Value
- inaugural chair of 2degrees mobile
- chair of CoreLogic New Zealand
- director of Transpower New Zealand
- director of Rangitira Services Ltd
- director of Ports of Auckland Ltd
- serving on the Maori Economic Development Commission
- establishing Te Huarahi Tika Trust, a trust handling Maori interests in the radio spectrum
- chair of Hautaki Limited, the commercial arm of the Te Huarahi Tika Trust.

He also served on the New Zealand Maori Rugby board. In 2017 he was elected vice-president of New Zealand Rugby Union, later ascending to the president's position. In 2022 he was appointed Chair of the Chiefs Rugby board.

== Osborne Taonga ==
In 2021 a new challenge trophy named after Osborne was announced for the Heartland Championship teams, to follow similar rules to the Ranfurly Shield.

Awards
Preceded by Kent Lambert	Tom French Memorial; Māori rugby union player of the year 1977	Succeeded by Eddie Dunn
