= John McEldowney (rugby union) =

- Born: John Thompson McEldowney; 26 October 1947 New Plymouth, New Zealand
- Died: 17 June 2012 (aged 64) New Plymouth, New Zealand
- Height: 1.83 m (6 ft 0 in)
- Weight: 104 kg (229 lb)
- School: New Plymouth Boys' High School

Rugby union career
- Position: Prop
Provincial / State sides
Years	Team	Apps	(Points)
1967–80	Taranaki	125	
International career
Years	Team	Apps	(Points)
1976–77	New Zealand	2	(0)

John Thompson McEldowney (26 October 1947 – 17 June 2012) was a New Zealand rugby union player. A prop, McEldowney represented Taranaki at a provincial level, and was a member of the New Zealand national side, the All Blacks, in 1976 and 1977. He played 10 matches for the All Blacks including two internationals.
