= Frank Oliver (rugby union) =

New Zealand rugby union player (1948–2014)

- Born: Francis James Oliver; 24 December 1948 Dunedin, New Zealand
- Died: 16 March 2014 (aged 65) Palmerston North, New Zealand
- Height: 1.91 m (6 ft 3 in)
- Weight: 107 kg (16 st 12 lb)
- School: Lawrence District High School
- Notable relative(s): Anton Oliver (son); James Oliver (son) Mark Donaldson (brother-in-law)

Rugby union career
- Position: Lock
Provincial / State sides
Years	Team	Apps	(Points)
1969–77	Southland	64	
1978–79	Otago	8	
1980–83	Manawatu	54	
International career
Years	Team	Apps	(Points)
1976–81	New Zealand	17	(4)
Coaching career
- Years: Team
- 1993–94: New Zealand U19
- 1995–96: Manawatu
- 1998–99: Central Vikings
- 1996–99: Hurricanes
- 2001: Blues

Francis James "Frank" Oliver (24 December 1948 – 16 March 2014) was a New Zealand rugby union player and coach. He captained the New Zealand national side, the All Blacks, in four matches.

== Biography ==
Born in Dunedin and educated at Lawrence District High School, Oliver made his provincial rugby debut for Southland in 1969. He later also played for Otago and Manawatu, playing a total of 213 first-class games.

Oliver played in the forwards as a lock and appeared in 43 matches for the All Blacks — 17 of them full test appearances — between 1976 and 1981, captaining the team in four matches. After retiring as a player in 1983, Oliver coached the Manawatu provincial team from 1995 to 1997 and the short-lived Central Vikings merged team from 1998 to 1999. In Super Rugby he coached the Hurricanes (1996–99) and the Blues (2001).

Oliver's son Anton followed in his father's footsteps, representing both Otago and New Zealand, and being All Blacks' captain. They are the first — and so far only — father-and-son combination to have captained the national side. Another son, James, played provincial rugby as a flanker and number 8 for Horowhenua Kapiti (11 games), Manawatu (43 games) and captained the New Zealand Universities team in 2013.

Outside of rugby, Oliver worked in forestry, and was running a sawmill business up until his death in 2014.
