= Brian Ford (rugby union, born 1951) =

- Born: Brian Robert Ford; 10 July 1951 (age 75) Kaikōura, New Zealand
- Height: 1.83 m (6 ft 0 in)
- Weight: 89 kg (196 lb)
- School: Rangiora High School

Rugby union career
- Position: Wing
Provincial / State sides
Years	Team	Apps	(Points)
1970–71	Canterbury	8	
1972–83	Marlborough	145	
International career
Years	Team	Apps	(Points)
1972	New Zealand Colts		
1977–79	New Zealand	4	(0)

Brian Robert Ford (born 10 July 1951) is a former New Zealand rugby union player. A wing, Ford represented Canterbury and Marlborough at a provincial level, and was a member of the New Zealand national side, the All Blacks, from 1977 to 1979. He played 20 matches for the All Blacks including four internationals. In 1988, he was one of the first two "celebrity entries"—alongside Kevin Eveleigh—at the annual Coast to Coast adventure race.
