= 1984 France rugby union tour of New Zealand =

Summary
P	W	D	L
Total
8	6	0	2
Test match
2	0	0	2
Opponent
P	W	D	L
New Zealand
2	0	0	2

The 1984 France rugby union tour of New Zealand was a series of eight matches played in June 1984 by the France national rugby union team in New Zealand. The team won all six of their matches against New Zealand provincial teams but lost both their internationals against the New Zealand All Blacks.

== Results ==
Scores and results list France's points tally first.

	Date	Opponent	Location	Result	Score
Match 1	2 June	Taranaki	Rugby Park, New Plymouth	Won	30–18
Match 2	6 June	Marlborough	Lansdowne Park, Blenheim	Won	36–9
Match 3	9 June	Wellington	Athletic Park, Wellington	Won	38–18
Match 4	12 June	Otago	Carisbrook, Dunedin	Lost	20–10
Match 5	16 June	NEW ZEALAND	Lancaster Park, Christchurch	Lost	9–10
Match 6	19 June	Hawke's Bay	McLean Park, Napier	Won	40–18
Match 7	23 June	NEW ZEALAND	Eden Park, Auckland	Lost	18–31
Match 8	26 June	Counties	Pukekohe Stadium, Pukekohe	Won	33–24

== Test matches ==
=== First Test ===
16 June 1984

New Zealand	10–9	France
Taylor (4 – 1t); Hewson (6 – 2pg)		(4 – 1t) Blanco (5 – 1c, 1pg) Lescarboura

Lancaster Park, Christchurch
Referee: W. Jones (Wales)

New Zealand: Allan Hewson, John Kirwan, Steven Pokere, Bruce Smith, Warwick Taylor, Wayne Smith, Andy Donald, John Ashworth, Andy Dalton (c), Gary Knight, Gary Whetton, Andy Haden, Mark Shaw, Murray Mexted, Jock Hobbs

France: Serge Blanco, Patrice Lagisquet, Didier Codorniou, Philippe Sella, Patrick Estève, Jean-Patrick Lescarboura, Pierre Berbizier, Pierre Dospital, Philippe Dintrans (c), Jean-Pierre Garuet, François Haget, Jean Condom, Laurent Rodriguez, Jean-Charles Orso, Jean-Luc Joinel.

=== Second Test ===
23 June 1984

New Zealand	31–18	France
Hewson (19 – 5pg, 2c); Taylor (4 – 1t); B. Smith (4 – 1t); Dalton (4 – 1t)		(14 – 2t, 2pg) Lescarboura (4 – 1t) Bonneval

Eden Park, Auckland
Referee: W. Jones (Wales)

New Zealand: Allan Hewson, John Kirwan, Steven Pokere, Bruce Smith, Warwick Taylor, Wayne Smith, Andy Donald, John Ashworth, Andy Dalton (c), Gary Knight, Gary Whetton, Andy Haden, Mark Shaw, Murray Mexted, Jock Hobbs

France: Serge Blanco, Patrice Lagisquet, Didier Codorniou (rep Eric Bonneval), Philippe Sella, Patrick Estève, Jean-Patrick Lescarboura, Pierre Berbizier, Pierre Dospital, Philippe Dintrans (c), Jean-Pierre Garuet, François Haget, Jean Condom, Laurent Rodriguez, Jacques Gratton, Jean-Luc Joinel.

== Touring party ==
- Manager: Yves Noé
- Assistant Manager: Jacques Fouroux
- Captain: Philippe Dintrans

=== Full-backs ===
- Serge Blanco
- Bernard Viviès

=== Three-quarters ===
- Patrice Lagisquet
- Patrick Estève
- Laurent Pardo
- Marc Andrieu
- Philippe Sella
- Didier Codorniou
- Eric Bonneval

=== Half-backs ===
- Jean-Patrick Lescarboura
- Guy Laporte
- Pierre Berbizier
- Henri Sanz

=== Forwards ===
- Bernard Herrero
- Philippe Dintrans
- Pierre-Édouard Detrez
- Daniel Dubroca
- Jean-Pierre Garuet-Lempirou
- Pierre Dospital
- Alain Lorieux
- Francis Haget
- Jean Condom
- Pierre Lacans
- Jean-Charles Orso
- Laurent Rodriguez
- Jacques Gratton
- Jean-Luc Joinel
