= 1980 New Zealand rugby union tour of North America and Wales =

Summary
P	W	D	L
Total
7	7	0	0
Test match
3	0	0	0
Opponent
P	W	D	L
United States
1	1	0	0
Canada
1	1	0	0
Wales
1	1	0	0

The 1980 New Zealand tour of Wales was a collection of friendly rugby union games undertaken by the New Zealand All Blacks against Wales that also took in two international games in North America en route to South Wales. This was a single test tour against each of the countries played, with four games against Welsh club opposition.

Although the games were played within a tight schedule, the All Blacks were victorious in all seven matches. New Zealand scored 32 tries for and only conceding 2 against, for a total points tally of 197 to 41 over the entire tour.

== Results ==
	Date	Opponent	Location	Result	Score
Match 1	8 October	USA	San Diego Stadium, San Diego	Won	6–53
Match 2	11 October	Canada	Swangard Stadium, Burnaby	Won	10–43
Match 3	18 October	Cardiff	Cardiff Arms Park, Cardiff	Won	9–16
Match 4	21 October	Llanelli	Stradey Park, Llanelli	Won	10–16
Match 5	25 October	Swansea	St Helens, Swansea	Won	0–32
Match 6	28 October	Newport	Rodney Parade, Newport	Won	3–14
Match 7	1 November	Wales	Cardiff Arms Park, Cardiff	Won	3–23

== Touring party ==
- Manager: R.A. Harper
- Assistant Manager: Eric Watson
- Captain: Graham Mourie (Taranaki)

=== Full-backs ===
- Brett Codlin (Counties)
- Doug Rollerson (Manawatu)

=== Three-quarters ===
- Bernie Fraser (Wellington)
- Bruce Robertson (Counties)
- Stu Wilson (Wellington)
- Fred Woodman (North Auckland)

=== Five-eighths ===
- Nicky Allen (Counties)
- Bill Osborne (Wanganui)
- Murray Taylor (Waikato)

=== Half-backs ===
- Mark Donaldson (Manawatu)
- Dave Loveridge (Taranaki)

=== Forwards ===
- John Ashworth (Canterbury)
- Andy Dalton (Counties)
- Andy Haden (Auckland)
- Graeme Higginson (Canterbury)
- Geoff Hines (Waikato)
- Rod Ketels (Counties)
- Gary Knight (Manawatu)
- Murray Mexted (Wellington)
- Graham Mourie (Taranaki)
- Geoff Old (Manawatu)
- Frank Oliver (Manawatu)
- Hika Reid (Bay of Plenty)
- Mark Shaw (Manawatu)
- John Spiers (Counties)

== Matches ==
=== United States ===
8 October

United States	6–53	New Zealand
Pen: Cooke (2)		Try: Woodman (3); Osborne (2); Wilson; Allen; Old; Con: Codlin (6); Pen: Codlin (3)

San Diego Stadium
Attendance: 10,000
Referee: I. Nixon (United States)

=== Canada ===
11 October

Canada	10–43	New Zealand
Try: Bibby; Pen:Schiefler (2)		Try: Shaw (3); Mourie; Haden; Osborne; Wilson; Fraser; Con: Rollerson (4); Pen: Rollerson

Swangard Stadium
Attendance: 10,000
Referee: C. Thomas (Wales)

=== Cardiff RFC ===
18 October

Cardiff RFC	9–16	New Zealand
Pen: Davies (2); Drop:Davies		Try: Fraser; Woodman; Con: Codlin; Pen: Codlin; Drop:Allen

Cardiff Arms Park
Attendance: 25,000
Referee: F. Palmade (France)

=== Llanelli RFC ===
21 October

Llanelli RFC	10–16	New Zealand
Try Jones; Pen:Bennett; Drop: Gravelle		Try: Rollerson; Robertson; Con: Rollerson; Pen: Rollerson; Drop:Taylor

Stradey Park
Attendance: 20,000
Referee: Alan Hosie (Scotland)

Like the game played three days earlier against Cardiff, Llanelli proved tough opposition for the touring New Zealand side. Of the seven games played during the tour this was the closest in score, with only a six-point margin and at half time Llanelli were actually 10–3 ahead.

This match is often remembered for a controversial refereeing decision by Scottish referee Alan Hosie. Towards the end of the game, with the match still in the balance, Hosie appeared to send off the All Black lock, Graeme Higginson, only for a group of Llanelli players, led by Phil Bennett to challenge the referee over the action. Higginson was allowed to stay on the field with Hosie stating later that there was no sending off, and he had only giving Higginson a warning.

=== Swansea RFC ===
25 October

Swansea RFC	0–32	New Zealand
		Try: Higginson; Shaw; Loveridge; Fraser; Wilson (2); Con: Rollerson; Pen: Rollerson (2)

St Helens
Attendance: 28,000
Referee: J. R. West (Ireland)

=== Newport RFC ===
28 October

Newport RFC	3–14	New Zealand
Pen: Bolland		Try: Shaw; Wilson; Pen: Coldin (2)

Rodney Parade
Attendance: unknown
Referee: A. Welsby (England)

=== Wales ===
1 November

Wales	3–23	New Zealand
Pen: Fenwick		Try: Mourie; Allen; Fraser; Reid; Con: Rollerson (2); Pen: Rollerson

Cardiff Arms Park
Attendance: 55,000
Referee: J. R. West (Ireland)

The All Blacks returned to the Cardiff Arms Park in the final game of the tour and quickly showed a dominance of the game that would continue until the final whistle. The fact that roughly 85% of the match was played in the Welsh half of the field correlates with the final score and the four tries from New Zealand that were without a Welsh reply. The defeat would have been far heavier, but Rollerson managed to convert only three of nine attempts at goal.

From this match only three Welsh players emerged with any credit. Full back J. P. R. Williams, scrum half Terry Holmes and on the wing 19-year-old Robert Ackerman, whose excellent covering play of Stu Wilson earned him a standing ovation when he left the field with an injury before the final whistle.
