= 1983 British Lions tour to New Zealand =

- Date: 15 May – 16 July
- Coach: (Scotland) Jim Telfer
- Tour captain: (Ireland) Ciaran Fitzgerald
- Test series winners: New Zealand (4–0)
- Top test point scorer: (Ireland) Ollie Campbell (15)
Summary
P	W	D	L
Total
18	12	0	6
Test match
4	0	0	4
Opponent
P	W	D	L
New Zealand
4	0	0	4

Tour chronology
- ← South Africa 1980 Australia 1989 →

In 1983, the British Lions rugby union team toured New Zealand for the first time since 1977. The Lions went down to a 4–0 whitewash for only the second time in history – the previous was also inflicted by the All Blacks on the 1966 Lions. Overall the Lions played eighteen matches, winning twelve and losing six. In addition to their four test defeats they also lost to the Auckland and Canterbury provincial unions.

The tour was captained by Ciaran Fitzgerald, coached by Jim Telfer and managed by Willie John McBride. The tour lasted 18 matches and almost 3 months, between May and July 1983.

== Injuries and replacements ==
In addition to the players originally selected, six players subsequently joined as replacements or cover for injured players;

- Nigel Melville, who had not yet been capped by England, replaced Terry Holmes who was injured in the first test.
- Melville was injured himself in his second match and was replaced by Steve Smith.
- Eddie Butler replaced Jeff Squire.
- Nick Jeavons replaced John O'Driscoll although O'Driscoll did resume playing on the tour.
- Donal Lenihan, an original selection who had to withdraw after being diagnosed with a hernia, subsequently replaced Robert Norster.
- Gerry McLoughlin replaced Ian Stephens.

== Squad ==
=== Management ===
- Manager Willie John McBride (Ireland)
- Coach Jim Telfer (Scotland)
- Doctor Donald McLeod
- Physio Kevin Murphy

=== Backs ===
- Robert Ackerman (London Welsh and Wales)
- Roger Baird (Kelso and Scotland),
- Ollie Campbell (Old Belvedere and Ireland),
- John Carleton (Orrell and England),
- Gwyn Evans (Maesteg and Wales),
- Dusty Hare (Leicester and England)
- Terry Holmes (Cardiff and Wales)
- David Irwin (Instonians and Ireland)
- Mike Kiernan (Dolphin and Ireland)
- Roy Laidlaw (Jedforest and Scotland)
- Hugo MacNeill (Oxford University and Ireland)
- Nigel Melville (Wasps)
- Trevor Ringland (Ballymena and Ireland)
- John Rutherford (Selkirk and Scotland)
- Steve Smith (Sale and England)
- Clive Woodward (Leicester and England)

=== Forwards ===
- Steve Bainbridge (Gosforth and England)
- John Beattie (Glasgow Academicals and Scotland)
- Steve Boyle (Gloucester and England)
- Eddie Butler (Pontypool and Wales)
- Jim Calder (Stewart's Melville FP and Scotland)
- Maurice Colclough (Angoulême and England)
- Colin Deans (Hawick and Scotland)
- Ciaran Fitzgerald (capt) (St Mary's College and Ireland)
- Nick Jeavons (Moseley and England)
- ST 'Staff' Jones (Pontypool and Wales)
- Donal Lenihan (Cork Constitution and Ireland)
- Gerry McLoughlin (Shannon and Ireland)
- Iain Milne (Heriot's FP and Scotland)
- Bob Norster (Cardiff and Wales)
- John O'Driscoll (London Irish and Ireland)
- Iain Paxton (Selkirk and Scotland)
- Graham Price (Pontypool and Wales)
- Jeff Squire (Pontypool and Wales)
- Ian Stephens (Bridgend and Wales)
- Peter Winterbottom (Headingley and England)

== Results ==
Date	Opponent	Location	Result	Score
15 May	Wanganui	Spriggens Park, Wanganui	Won	15–47
18 May	Auckland	Eden Park, Auckland	Lost	13–12
21 May	Bay of Plenty	Rotorua International Stadium, Rotorua	Won	16–34
25 May	Wellington	Athletic Park, Wellington	Won	19–27
28 May	Manawatu	The Showgrounds, Palmerston North	Won	18–25
31 May	Mid Canterbury	The Showgrounds, Ashburton	Won	6–26
4 June	New Zealand	Lancaster Park, Christchurch	Lost	16–12
8 June	West Coast	Rugby Park, Greymouth	Won	16–52
11 June	Southland	Rugby Park, Invercargill	Won	3–41
14 June	Wairarapa Bush	Memorial Park, Masterton	Won	10–57
18 June	New Zealand	Athletic Park, Wellington	Lost	9–0
25 June	North Auckland	Okara Park, Whangārei	Won	12–21
28 June	Canterbury	Lancaster Park, Christchurch	Lost	22–20
2 July	New Zealand	Carisbrook, Dunedin	Lost	15–8
6 July	Hawke's Bay	McLean Park, Napier	Won	19–25
9 July	Counties	Pukekohe Stadium, Pukekohe	Won	16–25
12 July	Waikato	Rugby Park, Hamilton	Won	13–40
16 July	New Zealand	Eden Park, Auckland	Lost	38–6

== Matches ==
=== First Test ===
4 June 1983

New Zealand	16–12	British Lions
Try: Shaw; Pen: Hewson (3); Drop: Hewson		Pen: Campbell (3); Drop Campbell

Lancaster Park, Christchurch
Attendance: 52,000
Referee: Francis Palmade (France)

New Zealand: Allan Hewson (Well), Stu Wilson (Well), Steven Pokere (Sthl), Bernie Fraser (Well), Warwick Taylor (Cant), Ian Dunn (N Auck), Dave Loveridge (Tar), Murray Mexted (Well), Jock Hobbs (Cant), Andy Haden (Auck), Gary Whetton (Auck), Mark Shaw (Man), John Ashworth (Cant), Andy Dalton (Count, cpt), Gary Knight (Man).

Lions: MacNeill, Ringland, Irwin, Ackerman, Baird, Campbell, Holmes (rep Laidlaw),Stephens, Fitzgerald (cpt), Price, Paxton, Winterbotom, Norster, Colclough, Squire, .

=== Second Test ===
18 June 1983

New Zealand	9–0	British Lions
Try: Loveridge c Con: Hewson; Pen: Hewson

Athletic Park, Wellington
Attendance: 39,000
Referee: Francis Palmade (France)

New Zealand: Allan Hewson (Well), Stu Wilson (Well), Steven Pokere (Sthl), Bernie Fraser (Well), Warwick Taylor (Cant), Wayne Smith (Cant), Dave Loveridge (Tar), Murray Mexted (Well), Jock Hobbs (Cant), Andy Haden (Auck), Gary Whetton (Auck), Mark Shaw (Man), John Ashworth (Cant), Andy Dalton (Count, cpt), Gary Knight (Man).

Lions: MacNeill, Carleton, Irwin, Kiernan, Baird, Campbell, Laidlaw, Jones, Fitzgerald (cpt), Price, Paxton (rep Beattie), Winterbotom, Norster, Colclough, O'Driscoll.

=== Third Test ===
2 July 1983

New Zealand	15–8	British Lions
Try: Wilson c Con: Hewson; Pen: Hewson (3)		Try: Baird, Rutherford

Carisbrook, Dunedin
Attendance: 32,000
Referee: Richard Byres (Australia)

New Zealand: Allan Hewson (Well), Stu Wilson (Well), Steven Pokere (Sthl), Bernie Fraser (Well), Warwick Taylor (Cant), Wayne Smith (Cant) (rep Arthur Stone (Wai)), Dave Loveridge (Tar), Murray Mexted (Well), Jock Hobbs (Cant), Andy Haden (Auck), Gary Whetton (Auck), Mark Shaw (Man), John Ashworth (Cant), Andy Dalton (Count, cpt), Gary Knight (Man).

Lions: Evans, Carleton, Kiernan, Rutherford, Baird, Campbell, Laidlaw, Jones, Fitzgerald (cpt), Price, Paxton, Winterbotom, Bainbridge, Colclough, Calder.

=== Fourth Test ===
16 July 1983

New Zealand	38–6	British Lions
Try: Wilson (3), Hobbs, Hewson, Haden; Con: Hewson (4); Pen: Hewson (2)		Pen: Campbell, Evans

Eden Park, Auckland
Attendance: 53,000
Referee: Richard Byres (Australia)

New Zealand: Allan Hewson (Well), Stu Wilson (Well), Steven Pokere (Sthl), Bernie Fraser (Well), Warwick Taylor (Cant), Ian Dunn (N Auck), Dave Loveridge (Tar), Murray Mexted (Well), Jock Hobbs (Cant), Andy Haden (Auck), Gary Whetton (Auck), Mark Shaw (Man), John Ashworth (Cant), Andy Dalton (Count, cpt), Gary Knight (Man).

Lions: Evans, Carleton, Irwin, Kiernan, Baird (rep Ackerman), Campbell (rep MacNeill), Laidlaw, Jones, Fitzgerald (cpt), Price, Paxton, Winterbotom, Bainbridge, Colclough, O'Driscoll.
