= 1985 New Zealand rugby union tour of Argentina =

1985 New Zealand tour of Argentina
- Date: Oct–Nov 1985
- Tour captain: Jock Hobbs
Summary
P	W	D	L
Total
7	6	1	0
Test match
2	1	1	0
Opponent
P	W	D	L
Argentina
2	1	1	0

The 1985 New Zealand rugby union tour of Argentina was a series of matches played in October and November 1985 in Argentina by New Zealand national rugby union team.

The national side played 7 matches, with 6 won and 1 draw in the second test v. Argentina, when fly-half Hugo Porta scored 21 points (four penalties and three drop goals) for Argentina. Porta would be named "the best fly-half of the world" at the end of that year.

The All Blacks were an extraordinary team. I was a very close friend of several players because of having faced them before and some matches disputed in New Zealand with invited combined teams. They had a mixture of experienced and young players that would later take part of that fabulous team that won the 1987 Rugby World Cup. Their style of playing was different from the Europeans, with a dominant presence and less improvisation

— Hugo Porta during an interview in 2003

== Matches ==
=== Summary ===
List of matches played by New Zealand in Argentina:

Test matches

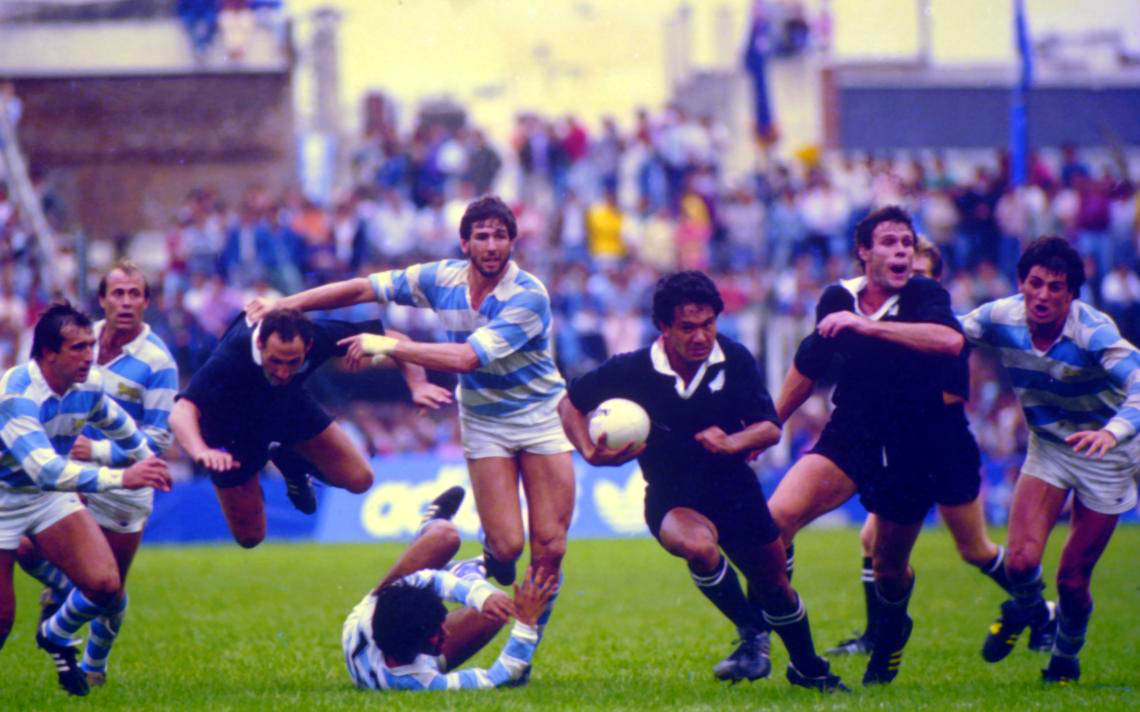
A moment of the second test v. Argentina at Ferro Carril Oeste, the only draw of the tour (21–21)

#	Date	Rival	City	Venue	Res.
1	12 Oct	C.A. San Isidro	Buenos Aires	Ferro C. Oeste	22–9
2	15 Oct	Rosario	Rosario	Jockey Club Stadium	28–9
3	19 Oct	Buenos Aires	Buenos Aires	Ferro C. Oeste	31–9
4	22 Oct	Córdoba	Córdoba	Chateau Carreras	72–9
5	26 Oct	Argentina	Buenos Aires	Ferro C. Oeste	33–20
6	29 Oct	Mar del Plata	Mar del Plata	José M. Minella	56–6
7	2 Nov	Argentina	Buenos Aires	Ferro C. Oeste	21–21

Balance
Pl	W	D	L	PS	PC
7	6	1	0	263	87

=== Details ===
26 October 1985

Argentina	20–33	New Zealand
Try: J. Lanza 17'; Cuesta Silva 40'; Pen: Porta 11', 50', 56'; Drop: Porta 21'	Report	Try: Kirwan 6', 56'; Kirwin 76'; Hobbs 79'; Con: Crowley 6'; Pen: Crowley 3', 34', 45', 55'; Drop: Fox 23'

Ferro C. Oeste, Buenos Aires
Attendance: 29,000
Referee: Kerry Fitzgerald (Australia)

Team details

Argentina	New Zealand

Argentina			New Zealand
Bernardo Miguens	FB	15	FB	Kieran Crowley
Juan Lanza	W	14	W	John Kirwan
Diego Cuesta Silva	C	13	C	Victor Simpson
Fabián Turnes	C	12	C	Warwick Taylor
Pedro Lanza	W	11	W	Craig Green
Hugo Porta (c)	FH	10	FH	Grant Fox
Guillermo Holmgren	SH	9	SH	David Kirk
Ernesto Ure	N8	8	N8	Murray Mexted
Tomás Petersen	F	7	F	Jock Hobbs (c)
Jorge Allen	F	6	F	Mark Shaw
Gustavo Milano	L	5	L	Andy Haden
Eliseo Branca	L	4	L	Murray Pierce
Fernando Morel	P	3	P	Brian McGrattan
Tomás Cubelli	H	2	H	Hika Reid
Diego Cash	P	1	P	Steve McDowall
Coach:				Coach:
(Argentina) Héctor Silva		HC		(New Zealand) Brian Lochore

2 November 1985

Argentina	21–21	New Zealand
Pen: Porta (4); Drop: Porta (3)	Report	Try: Kirwan (2); Mexted (1); Green (1); Con: Crowley (1); Pen: Crowley (1)

Ferro C. Oeste, Buenos Aires
Attendance: 24,000
Referee: Kerry Fitzgerald (Australia)

Team details

Argentina	New Zealand

Argentina			New Zealand
Bernardo Miguens	FB	15	FB	Kieran Crowley
Juan Lanza	W	14	W	John Kirwan
Diego Cuesta Silva	C	13	C	Victor Simpson
Fabián Turnes	C	12	C	Warwick Taylor
Pedro Lanza	W	11	W	Craig Green
Hugo Porta (c)	FH	10	FH	Wayne Smith
Guillermo Holmgren	SH	9	SH	Dave Loveridge
Ernesto Ure	N8	8	N8	Murray Mexted
Tomás Petersen	F	7	F	Jock Hobbs (c)
Jorge Allen	F	6	F	Mark Shaw
Gustavo Milano	L	5	L	Andy Haden
Eliseo Branca	L	4	L	Gary Whetton
Fernando Morel	P	3	P	Brian McGrattan
Tomás Cubelli	H	2	H	Hika Reid
Diego Cash	P	1	P	Steve McDowall
Coach:				Coach:
(Argentina) Héctor Silva		HC		(New Zealand) Brian Lochore
