= Ian Stephens (rugby union) =

Welsh rugby union footballer

- Born: Ian Stephens; 22 May 1952 (age 74) Tongwynlais, Cardiff, Wales

Rugby union career
- Position: Prop
Amateur team(s)
Years	Team	Apps	(Points)
- Taffs Well RFC
–	Bridgend RFC		
–	Barbarian F.C.		
International career
Years	Team	Apps	(Points)
1981-1984	Wales	13	(0)
1983	British Lions	1	(0)

Ian "Ike" Stephens (born 22 May 1952) is a former Wales international rugby union player. A prop who toured twice with the British & Irish Lions, visiting South Africa in 1980 and New Zealand in 1983, winning one cap. At the time, he played club rugby for Bridgend RFC. Stephens was a tough, hard-nosed prop who had the rare ability to play both sides of the scrum at the highest level, though his preferred position was loosehead.

== Rugby career ==
=== Bridgend ===
Stephens started his career playing for Taffs Well RFC and won the Silver Ball with them in 1974. He played two games for Pontypridd RFC before joining Bridgend RFC in 1975. Bridgend was a very successful team in the late 1970s and early 1980s, appearing in the WRU Challenge Cup final four seasons in a row. They beat Pontypridd RFC 18–12 in the final in 1979, lifting the trophy for the first time, and retained it the following season by beating Swansea RFC 15–9 in 1980. The team were beaten finalists the next two seasons, both times losing to Cardiff RFC, one of which was decided on try count. Ian also played for Bridgend RFC against the touring All Blacks in 1978, the infamous game where JPR Williams had his face stamped on by All Black prop John Ashworth. Ian captained Bridgend RFC in 1985 and made over 385 appearances over a 12-year period. Unfortunately, Ian missed Bridgend RFC’s famous victory over Australia in 1982 due to being sent off against Cardiff RFC the week before. However, he did play against them for Wales a couple of weeks later, winning 18-13. Ian was a firm favourite at Bridgend, and fans would often bet on how long it would take for him to rip the shorts off his opponent during a game, as he often bound on his opponent’s pocket during scrums. The joke was that you always had to wear clean underwear when you played against Ike.

=== Wales ===
Stephens was drafted into the Welsh squad in 1978, making his first appearance for Wales B against France B in 1979. His first cap for Wales came in 1981 against England at Cardiff Arms Park, a match which Wales won 21-19. He played 18 times for Wales, although five of them were classed as non-capped games. These games were against the WRU President’s XV in 1981, New Zealand Maoris in 1983, WRU President’s XV in 1984, and two games on Wales’ tour of the USA and Canada in 1980. Wales beat the star-studded WRU President’s XV 27-17 in Cardiff in 1981. The team was captained by Bill Beaumont and featured many of the rugby stars of that era, such as Andy Haden, Dave Loveridge, Serge Blanco, Mark Ella, Andy Irvine and Jean-Pierre Rives. His last game for Wales was against Australia in 1984, where he was replaced early in the first half by Jeff Whitefoot. Stephens was suffering from nerve damage in his neck and shoulder leading up to this game, but the Wales management decided to start him, hoping that the adrenaline of the occasion would see him through. Ian retired from international rugby in 1986.

=== British & Irish Lions ===
Stephens toured twice with the British & Irish Lions, first as an early replacement for England prop Phil Blakeway on the tour to South Africa in 1980, and then to New Zealand in 1983. He is one of the very few players to have represented the British & Irish Lions before being capped by his country. He made five appearances in South Africa, winning all five fixtures. Ian sat on the bench for all four tests in South Africa and had to wait three years to win a test place against New Zealand in 1983, which the British & Irish Lions narrowly lost 16-12. He played four games on this tour, scoring a try against Bay of Plenty RFC. Unfortunately, he suffered a severe knee injury a week before the second test and was ruled out for the game. The medical team tried to get him fit for the third test but without success, ending Ian’s tour.

=== Barbarians and representative ===
He made 13 appearances for the Barbarians, including fixtures against Racing Metro 92 in Paris in 1982, an Italian XV in Rome in 1985, and he captained them against Swansea RFC in 1983. He was also selected to play for the RFU President’s XV against England at Twickenham in 1984, a game to commemorate 75 years at Twickenham. The RFU President’s XV, featuring many rugby greats like Danie Gerber, Errol Tobias, Terry Holmes, and Rob Louw, won the game 10-27.

=== Retirement ===
Stephens played against some of the best tighthead props ever, such as Graham Price, Robert Paparemborde and Gary Knight. It was inevitable that after his playing days were over, he would go on to share his vast knowledge and experiences with others. He went on to coach Taffs Well RFC, Mountain Ash RFC, and Bridgend RFC. He then moved on to become Wales U21 Manager from 1998-2000, Wales A Manager from 2000-2003, and Wales Senior Manager for a match against Romania in Wrexham in 2003.
