= 1984 Five Nations Championship =

Rugby Union tournament

- Date: 21 January - 17 March 1984
- Countries: England; Ireland; France; Scotland; Wales

Tournament statistics
- Champions: Scotland (12th title)
- Grand Slam: Scotland (2nd title)
- Triple Crown: Scotland (9th title)
- Matches played: 10
- Tries scored: 27 (2.7 per match)
- Top point scorer: (France) Jean-Patrick Lescarboura (54 points)
- Top try scorer: (France) Philippe Sella (3 tries)

The 1984 Five Nations Championship was the fifty-fifth series of the rugby union Five Nations Championship. Including the previous incarnations as the Home Nations and Five Nations, this was the ninetieth edition of the competition. Ten matches were played between 21 January and 17 March.

Scotland won the championship outright for the first time since 1938. It was their twelfth outright championship, excluding a further seven shared titles. Their four wins gave them the Grand Slam for the first time since 1925 and the second in all, and the Triple Crown for the ninth time and the first since 1938.

It was also the second time, after 1978, in which two teams with three victories each faced off against each other in the final round of matches, with both capable of completing a Grand Slam with a victory.

== Participants ==
Nation	Venue	City	Head coach	Captain
England	Twickenham Stadium	London	Dick Greenwood	Peter Wheeler
France	Parc des Princes	Paris	Jacques Fouroux	Jean-Pierre Rives
Ireland	Lansdowne Road	Dublin	Willie John McBride	Willie Duggan/Ciaran Fitzgerald
Scotland	Murrayfield Stadium	Edinburgh	Jim Telfer	Jim Aitken
Wales	National Stadium	Cardiff	John Bevan	Eddie Buttler/Mike Watkins

== Table ==
Pos	Team	Pld	W	D	L	PF	PA	PD	Pts
1	Scotland	4	4	0	0	86	36	+50	8
2	France	4	3	0	1	90	67	+23	6
3	Wales	4	2	0	2	67	60	+7	4
4	England	4	1	0	3	51	83	−32	2
5	Ireland	4	0	0	4	39	87	−48	0

== Results ==
21 January 1984

France	25–12	Ireland
Try: Gallion; Sella; Con: Lescarboura; Pen: Lescarboura (4); Drop: Lescarboura		Pen: Campbell (4)

Parc des Princes, Paris
Attendance: 45,023
Referee: C. Norling (Wales)

21 January 1984

Wales	9–15	Scotland
Try: Titley; Con: Davies; Pen: Davies		Try: Paxton; Aitken; Con: Dods (2); Pen: Dods

National Stadium, Cardiff
Referee: O. E. Doyle (Ireland)

4 February 1984

Ireland	9–18	Wales
Pen: Campbell (3)		Try: Ackerman; Con: Davies; Pen: Davies (2); Bowen (2)

Lansdowne Road, Dublin
Referee: R. G. Byres (Australia)

4 February 1984

Scotland	18–6	England
Try: Johnston; Kennedy; Con: Dods (2); Pen: Dods (2)		Pen: Hare (2)

Murrayfield Stadium, Edinburgh
Referee: D. I. H. Burnett (Ireland)

18 February 1984

Wales	16–21	France
Try: Davies; Butler; Con: Davies; Pen: Davies (2)		Try: Sella; Con: Lescarboura; Pen: Lescarboura (4); Drop: Lescarboura

National Stadium, Cardiff
Attendance: 62,000
Referee: R. G. Byers (Australia)

18 February 1984

England	12–9	Ireland
Pen: Hare (3); Drop: Cusworth		Pen: Ward (3)

Twickenham Stadium, London
Referee: René Hourquet France

3 March 1984

France	32–18	England
Try: Codorniou; Sella; Estève; Begu; Gallion; Con: Lescarboura (3); Pen: Lescarboura; Drop: Lescarboura		Try: Hare; Underwood; Con: Hare (2); Pen: Hare (2)

Parc des Princes, Paris
Attendance: 45,240
Referee: Alan Hosie (Scotland)

3 March 1984

Ireland	9–32	Scotland
Try: Kiernan; Con: Murphy; Pen: Murphy		Try: Laidlaw (2); Penalty try Robertson; Dods; Con: Dods (3); Pen: Dods (2)

Lansdowne Road, Dublin
Referee: F. A. Howard (England)

17 March 1984

Scotland	21–12	France
Try: Calder; Con: Dods; Pen: Dods (5)		Try: Gallion; Con: Lescarboura; Pen: Lescarboura; Drop: Lescarboura

Murrayfield Stadium, Edinburgh
Attendance: 62,000
Referee: W. Jones (Wales)

17 March 1984

England	15–24	Wales
Pen: Hare (5)		Try: Hadley; Con: Davies; Pen: Davies (4); Drop: Dacey (2)

Twickenham Stadium, London
Referee: J. B. Anderson (Scotland)
