= Michael Knight =

Michael Knight is the name of:

- Michael E. Knight (born 1959), American actor known for work in daytime soap operas
- Michael Knight (Australian politician) (born 1952), Australian former politician
- Michael Knight (Knight Rider), the fictional main character of Knight Rider, a popular U.S. television show from the 1980s
- Michael Muhammad Knight (born 1977), American novelist and journalist
- Michael Knight (rugby union) (born 1945), New Zealand rugby union player
- Michael Knight (writer), American writer of fiction
- Michael Knight (RAF officer) (1932–2022), British air marshal
- Michael T. Knight (1832–1916), official and politician in Newfoundland

== See also ==
- Mychael Knight (1978–2017), contestant on the reality television show Project Runway
- Mickey Knight (born 1959), American pornographic actor
- Michael McKnight, Canadian politician
- Michael McKnight, musician and lead singer of Soulidium
