= Craig Green (rugby union) =

New Zealand rugby union player

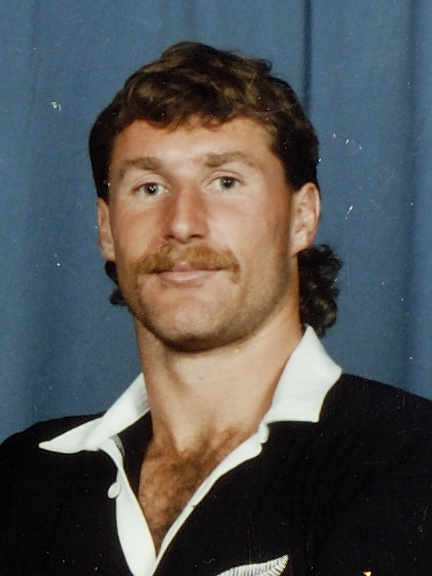
- Green in 1987
- Born: Craig Ivan Green; 23 March 1961 (age 65) Christchurch, New Zealand
- Height: 1.78 m (5 ft 10 in)
- Weight: 79 kg (12 st 6 lb)
- School: Shirley Boys' High School
- Notable relative: John Ashworth
- Occupation: Rugby union coach

Rugby union career
- Position: Utility player
Senior career
Years	Team	Apps	(Points)
1987–91	Benetton Treviso		
1991–94	Casale		
Provincial / State sides
Years	Team	Apps	(Points)
1982–1985	Canterbury	160	(440)
International career
Years	Team	Apps	(Points)
1983–1987	New Zealand	20	(44)

Craig Ivan Green (born 23 March 1961) is a New Zealand born former rugby union footballer and coach. He was part of the 1987 Rugby World Cup winning All Blacks team.

He played provincial rugby for Mid-Canterbury and Canterbury and he also played for the New Zealand Colts and went on the rebel New Zealand Cavaliers tour of South Africa in 1986. He finished off his career in Italy.

== New Zealand rugby career ==
Green started his provincial career in the mid-field for Mid-Canterbury. He then moved to Christchurch and played for Canterbury, where he won the National Provincial Championship in 1983 and was one of the key players during Canterbury's 1982-1985 Ranfurly Shield era. While at Canterbury he was asked by the coach, Alex Wyllie to move from the mid-field to the wing as Canterbury also had Warwick Taylor and Victor Simpson in the squad. Although not as fast as some top-level wingers, his skills and try-scoring ability saw him succeed at provincial level as well as leading to him gaining selection for the All Blacks.

He played 39 times (including 20 test matches) as an All Black from 1983 until 1987, with the highlight of his career being winning the inaugural 1987 Rugby World Cup. He scored six tries in the 1987 world cup including 4 tries against Fiji. He then "walked away" from New Zealand rugby at 26 because of the low compensation despite the time and commitment required.

Green scored 110 tries in his 160 first class games for New Zealand provincial or national teams. He was selected as one of the “Five players of the year” for the 1985 season in the Rugby Almanack of New Zealand.

== Italian playing career ==
From 1985 to 1989 he played in Italy, at Benetton Treviso, club where he won the Italian championship in 1989. One of his partners in the Italian team was the All Black John Kirwan, Green's teammate in the 1987 World Cup won by the New Zealanders.

In 1991 he moved to Casale, where he played until 1994.

== Coaching career ==
Green coached schoolboy rugby at Brisbane Boys' College in Brisbane, Australia.

Between 2002 and 2007 he went back to Italy, to coach his former player days team Benetton Treviso. With the Italian club he had a hugely successful era; achieving the national title in 2003, 2004, 2006 and 2007, and the Coppa Italia in 2005.

Green also coached the Italian under 20 team
