= Waiuku District Rugby Football Club =

NZ Rugby Union Club in Auckland, New Zealand

- Club logo
- Union: Counties Manukau
- Founded: 1956
- Location: Waiuku
- Region: Auckland
- Ground: Rugby Park Waiuku
Team kit

Official website
- waiukudrfc.co.nz

Waiuku District Rugby Football Club (commonly known as Waiuku Rugby Club or WDRFC) is a senior rugby union club based in Waiuku, Auckland Region, New Zealand. It competes in the Counties Manukau Rugby Football Union club competitions.

== History ==
Rugby in Waiuku dates back to the 1890s. By 1906, the team was known as City. In 1921, clubs City, Waipipi, and Otaua formed the Waiuku Rugby Union, later joined by Aka Aka in 1923, along with other short-lived clubs such as Glenbrook and Peninsula.

On 5 March 1956, the Waiuku District Rugby Football Club was officially formed through the merger of the City Ramblers and Otaua clubs, consolidating local resources and establishing Rugby Park, Waiuku as the club's home ground.

== Community and structure ==
WDRFC supports senior (Premier), U85, age-grade teams (U19, U21), and junior sides. The club places a strong emphasis on community, sportsmanship, and youth development through its academy programmes.

Waiuku has long been renowned for producing powerful forward packs, a reputation often linked to the town's industrial roots and the influence of the nearby Glenbrook Steel Mill. Many of the club's players over the decades have been hard-working locals from physically demanding jobs, bringing natural strength and toughness to their play style. This forward-focused playing style became a hallmark of Waiuku rugby, earning respect throughout the Counties Manukau competition.

Following Stephen "Beaver" Donald's memorable performance in the 2011 Rugby World Cup Final, his hometown of Waiuku experienced "Beaver fever." The Waiuku Rugby Club renamed their home ground "Beaver Park" in his honour in recognition of his role in the All Blacks victory over France. Donald's journey from local club rugby to kicking the winning points on rugby's biggest stage became a source of local pride.

Waiuku Rugby Club continues to play a prominent role in the Counties Manukau rugby community through its competitive teams, strong player development, and rich history.

== Recent performance and competition history ==
=== McNamara Cup Premier 1 ===
Waiuku has won the Counties Manukau McNamara Cup on four occasions, in 1958, 2000, 2003, and 2010. The club were runners-up in 2004 and 2009.

=== Sid Marshall Shield Division 3 ===
In 2022, Waiuku's Premier side moved into Division 3 of the Counties Manukau competition. The team reached the final in its first season in the division, where it was defeated 20–15 by Puni.

The 2023 season saw the return of former All Black Stephen Donald to Waiuku, with the club reaching the semifinals.

Waiuku again reached the final in 2024, narrowly losing 34–32 to Onewhero in a closely contested match at Navigation Homes Stadium, Pukekohe.

In 2025, Waiuku again competed in the Sid Marshall Shield competition, reaching the Cup final before being defeated by Puni.

=== Bob Chandler Cup Premier 2 ===
In 2026, Waiuku returned to Division 2 for the first time since 2021. The Premier 2 side was strengthened by a number of under-21 and under-19 players and enjoyed a strong season, reaching the semifinals. Waiuku was defeated 64–15 by eventual champions Karaka.

=== Under 85kg Team Success ===
Waiuku's Under-85 kg side, known as the Bulldogs, won the Counties Manukau Under-85 kg Championship in 2023.

In 2024, the Bulldogs remained undefeated throughout the season, continuing their strong performances in the grade.

In 2025, Waiuku again reached the Counties Manukau Under-85 kg final, where the Bulldogs were narrowly defeated 20–19 by the Pukekohe Pirates. The team subsequently competed in the Under-85 kg National Club Cup, advancing to the third round before losing 26–17 to the Pakuranga Panthers, the reigning national champions.

In 2026, the Bulldogs won their third Under-85 kg title in five seasons, defeating the Pukekohe Pirates 22–16 in the CMRFU/WRU Under-85 Championship. Waiuku then produced its strongest National Club Cup campaign to date, advancing to the quarter-finals. The Bulldogs again faced the Pakuranga Panthers, losing 26–17 in a rematch of the previous year's third-round encounter.

== Notable players ==
=== All Blacks ===
- Kevin Skinner – All Blacks prop (1949–56, 20 caps; captain) played for Waiuku in 1956.
- Pat Walsh – All Black midfielder (1955–63, 13 caps) played for Waiuku in the 1950s.
- Stephen "Beaver" Donald – All Black first-five (2008–11, 25 caps) kicked the winning penalty in the 2011 Rugby World Cup Final. Donald stands as Waiuku's most famous rugby export, proudly regarded as the club's first locally bred All Black. Donald last played for Waiuku in 2020 and 2023.
- Bob Lendrum – All Black fullback (1 cap in 1973), originally from Waiuku.

=== Club legends and centurions ===
- Jim Coe – Played 180 games for Counties Manukau, the second-most in Steelers history; also served as union president. NZ Maori representative from 1992–99 and Super Rugby player (Blues). He was named in 2000 as the NPC's "greatest legend" for the competition's first 25 years.
- Simon Lemalu – Samoa international prop and former Super Rugby player (Chiefs)
- Ronald Raaymakers – Former New Zealand U20 representative and Super Rugby player (Blues), key member of Counties Manukau's Ranfurly Shield-winning team.
- Grant Henson – Counties Manukau centurion hooker (100+ games), played over 200 premier matches for Waiuku, winning three McNamara Cups.
- Mark Muir – Veteran tighthead prop who played over 200 senior games for Waiuku, winning Premier titles in 2003 and 2010.
- Roy Craig – Respected Waiuku club stalwart known for his dedication and strong performances.
- Alan Dawson – Legendary number eight who played a record 202 games for Counties Manukau between 1976 and 1989, captaining the side in his later years. He helped Counties win the 1979 NPC First Division title and was ranked #2 on the Counties Manukau "Mount Rushmore" for his contribution to the union and provincial rugby.

=== Waiuku representatives in Counties Manukau Steelers ===
(Steelers player number in brackets)

- 24 – Carl Thomas Edwards
- 27 – Raymond Joseph Enoka
- 33 – Mark Graeme Christie
- 34 – Graeme John Murray
- 35 – Arthur Lancelot Enoka
- 39 – Bruce John Wymbush
- 44 – Peter Andrew Allen
- 45 – Ian Campbell Ellery
- 64 – Terence John Hogan
- 81 – Clifford Goodwin Honey
- 121 – Geoffrey David Baird
- 125 – Stuart John Dickey
- 138 – Roy Harry Craig
- 139 – Ross Edward Brighouse
- 146 – Allan Frederick Gee
- 158 – Alan K Dickey
- 159 – William Frederick (Bill) Walters
- 174 – Wayne Erikson
- 176 – Graham George Walters
- 210 – Peter Gordon Clotworthy
- 231 – Alan James Dawson
- 238 – John Andrew Kennedy
- 246 – Murray Graham Fowlie
- 249 – Gordon Jakeman
- 255 – Dallas Edmonds
- 265 – Colin Thompson
- 280 – Geoffrey Frank Knight
- 293 – John Taylor
- 304 – Ross Stewart Knight
- 311 – Keith John Fowlie
- 321 – James Neil (Jim) Coe
- 359 – Andrew Peter Dawkins
- 365 – Brian Toki
- 387 – Ben L Lloyd
- 400 – Henare Benjamin Leach
- 402 – Michael Scott (rugby union, born 1969)
- 463 – Grant William Henson
- 485 – Steven Alan Irwin
- 494 – Ramon James Lindsay
- 501 – David Wyatt Stewart
- 511 – David Roy Duley
- 526 – Duncan P Bell
- 542 – John W Kennedy
- 556 – Tevita A Finau
- 561 – Sosefo Kata
- 564 – Gavin Rhys Donald
- 569 – F Maka Tatafu
- 692 – Lucky Palamo
- 699 – Andrew Muirhead
- 702 – Luke A Graham
- 703 – Daniel Thomas Hyatt
- 747 – Tevita Nabura
- 752 – Michael J F McKee
- 759 – Suetena Asomua

== Publications ==
The club's history has been documented in several publications, including:

- Waiuku Rugby Through the Ages (25th Jubilee, 1981; 28 pages)
- 100 Years of Waiuku Rugby (1894–1994; Brett Donald, 96 pages)
- Waiuku and District Rugby Club: 50 Years of Pride (1956–2006; Brett Donald, 120 pages)
