= Jimmy Tupou =

NZ rugby union player

- Born: 8 August 1992 (age 34) Auckland, New Zealand
- Height: 1.95 m (6 ft 5 in)
- Weight: 111 kg (17 st 7 lb; 245 lb)
- School: Pukekohe High School
- University: Tuakau College

Rugby union career
- Position: Lock / loose forward
Senior career
Years	Team	Apps	(Points)
2012–2017	Counties Manukau	54	(27)
2013–16	Crusaders	37	(5)
2017–2018	Blues	16	(5)
2020–2023	NTT Shining Arcs	33	(20)
2024ー2025	Chiefs	15	(5)
2026	Moana Pasifika		
- Correct as of 21 February 2021
International career
Years	Team	Apps	(Points)
2012	New Zealand U20	4	(5)
- Correct as of 5 June 2018

Jimmy Tupou (born 8 August 1992) is a New Zealand rugby union player who plays as a lock or loose forward for the Counties Manukau Steelers in New Zealand's domestic Mitre 10 Cup and the Blues in the international Super Rugby competition.

== Early career ==
Born in Auckland, Tupou attended Pukekohe High School where he initially played rugby league before finally trying his hand at union in his senior year. He was quickly fast-tracked into the Counties Manukau Under-18 side and later played a key role in helping his club side, Patumahoe lift the McNamara Cup, the senior premier club title in Counties Manukau, in 2012.

== Senior career ==
Coming off the back of impressive performances for New Zealand at Under-20 level, Tupou made the Counties Manukau squad for the 2012 ITM Cup. Despite having just turned 20 before the tournament started, he instantly became a regular starter for the Steelers, playing nine times and scoring one try as the men from Pukekohe lifted the Championship trophy and earned promotion to the Premiership for 2013.

He continued to excel at Premiership level, playing nine times in 2013, 2014 and 2015 and later being named co-captain for the 2016 season. Being one of the senior players in an inexperienced line up he performed admirably, starting 10 of the Steelers' 11 games during a campaign which took them to the Premiership semi-finals before they succumbed to eventual winners Canterbury.

== Super Rugby ==
Strong performances in his debut season at provincial level with Counties Manukau saw him named in the Crusaders squad ahead of the 2013 Super Rugby season. In a star-studded squad featuring the likes of Richie McCaw and Kieran Read in the loose forward department, Tupou's rookie season at Super Rugby level was limited to just two substitute appearances. However, over the following three seasons spent in Canterbury, he became a regular in the 23 man squad. With his appearances generally restricted to that of a second-half substitute, he turned out 12, 11 and 12 times across the 2014, 2015 and 2016 seasons.

Looking for more game time, he agreed a move north to join the Auckland-based Blues ahead of the 2017 Super Rugby season.

== International ==
Tupou was a member of the New Zealand Under 20 team that finished as runner-up in the 2012 IRB Junior World Championship in South Africa. He scored one try in four appearances at the tournament.

== Career honours ==
Counties Manukau

- ITM Cup Championship - 2012

== Super Rugby statistics ==
As of 27 November 2016

Season	Team	Games	Starts	Sub	Mins	Tries	Cons	Pens	Drops	Points	Yel	Red
2013	Crusaders	2	0	2	53	0	0	0	0	0	0	0
2014	Crusaders	12	1	11	239	0	0	0	0	0	0	0
2015	Crusaders	11	2	9	294	0	0	0	0	0	0	0
2016	Crusaders	12	4	8	434	1	0	0	0	5	0	0
Total		37	7	30	1020	1	0	0	0	5	0	0
