= Helen Thayer =

New Zealand-born explorer

Helen Thayer (née Nicholson; born 12 November 1937) is a New Zealand-born explorer who lives in the United States. In 2009, Thayer was named one of the most important explorers of the 20th century by the National Geographic Society.

== Biography ==
Thayer was raised on a farm at Whitford, near Howick outside Auckland, New Zealand and attended Pukekohe High School. Sir Edmund Hillary was a friend of her parents, Ray and Margaret Nicholson, and at the age of 9 she and her parents climbed Mount Taranaki with Hillary; she later said that this experience inspired her to explore mountaineering and the outdoors. She competed in track and field events, and represented New Zealand in discus at the 1962 British Empire and Commonwealth Games in Perth, Australia. In the early 1960s she represented Guatemala in discus at the Caribbean Games, and in 1975 she won the United States National Luge title.

Thayer studied laboratory medicine in Auckland, and graduated in 1961. The same year, she left New Zealand and lived in Guatemala and Honduras, before settling in the United States in 1965. She has completed a number of expeditions, including walking 6440km across the Sahara Desert from Morocco to the Nile River and hence becoming the first woman to cross the Sahara; walking 2575km across the Mongolian Gobi Desert; becoming the first non-indigenous woman to kayak 3540km along the Amazon River and living alongside a wolf den for more than six months in the Yukon. She and her husband were the first couple to travel unsupported to the Magnetic North Pole. At the age of 50, she became the first woman to travel solo to the magnetic North Pole, pulling her own sled without resupply. She travelled on foot, with no outside help.

In 1990 Thayer was team leader of the first Soviet-American Women’s Arctic Expedition to Siberia.

In 1988, Thayer and her husband founded a not-for-profit educational programme, Adventure Classroom, where they provide classroom materials and lessons describing their adventures and expeditions.

=== Personal life ===
Thayer is married to Bill Thayer, an American helicopter pilot and explorer.

== Awards ==
Thayer was honored by the White House and the National Geographic Society, and named "One of the Great Explorers of the 20th Century" by National Geographic and NPR. She was also inducted into the Snohomish County, Washington Sports Hall of Fame. She has received the Northwest Explorers Club's Vancouver Award, and the Robert Henning Award from the Alaskan Geographic Alliance for exploration and education.

== Publications ==
- Thayer, H. (2007). Walking The Gobi: A 1600 Mile Trek Across a Desert of Hope and Despair. Mountaineers Books
- Thayer, H. (2003). Three among the wolves: A year of friendship with wolves in the wild. Newsage Press.
- Thayer, H. (2002). Polar dream: The first solo expedition by a woman and her dog to the magnetic North Pole. Troutdale, Or: NewSage Press.
- Thayer, H. (1993). Polar dream. New York u.a: Simon & Schuster.
