= Tom Taylor (rugby union) =

NZ international rugby union player (born 1989)

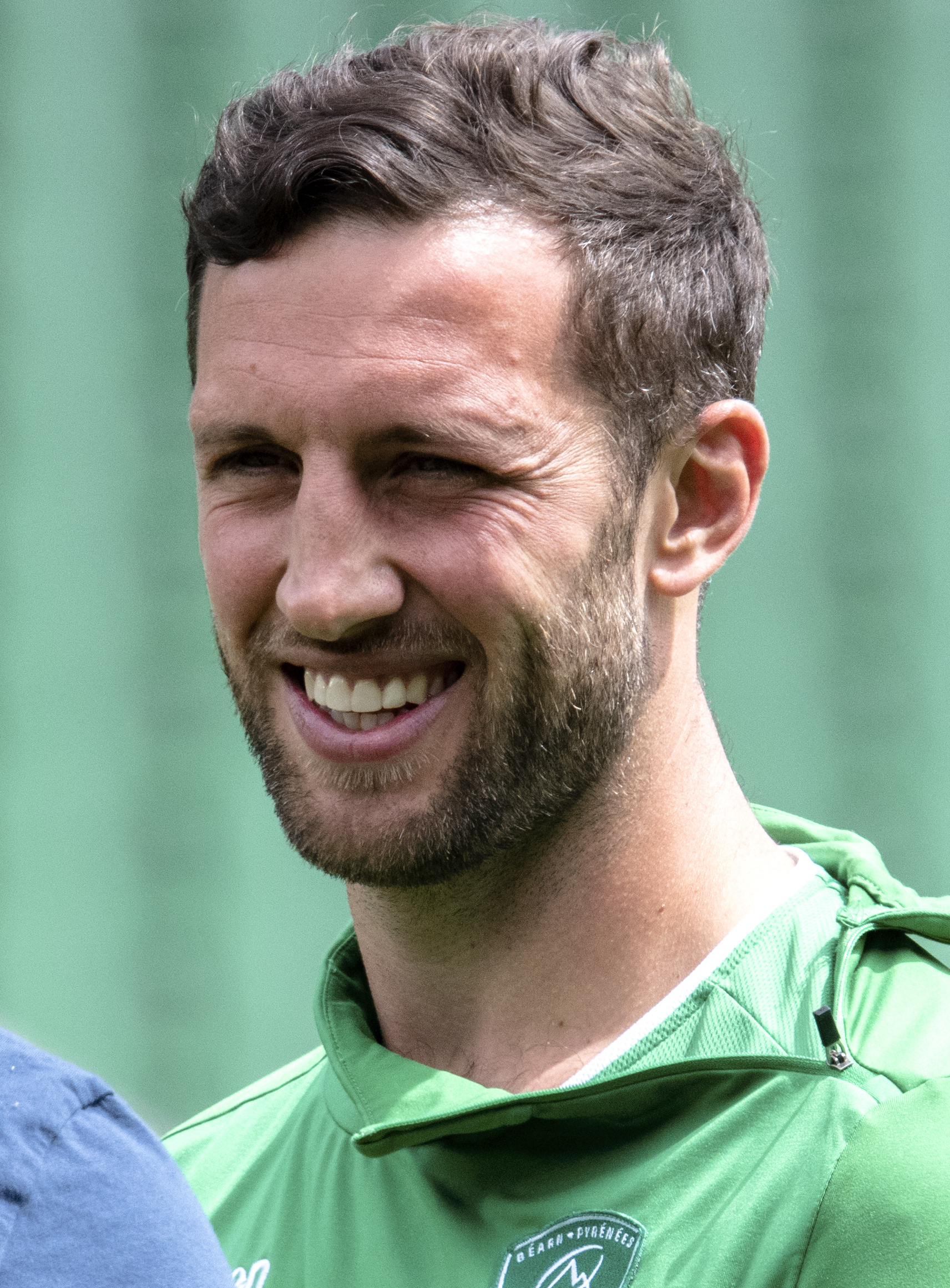
- Born: Thomas James Taylor; 11 March 1989 (age 37) Christchurch, New Zealand
- Height: 1.83 m (6 ft 0 in)
- Weight: 90 kg (14 st 2 lb; 198 lb)
- School: Burnside High School
- Notable relative(s): Warwick Taylor (father); Murray Taylor (uncle)

Rugby union career
- Position(s): Second five-eighth First five-eighth Fullback
Senior career
Years	Team	Apps	(Points)
2015–16	Toulon	16	(26)
2016—2020	Pau	71	(459)
2021–2023	Toshiba Brave Lupus	23	(210)
2023–2025	Kyuden Voltex	20	(27)
- Correct as of 21 February 2021
Provincial / State sides
Years	Team	Apps	(Points)
2011–15	Canterbury	40	(502)
- Correct as of 26 October 2015
Super Rugby
Years	Team	Apps	(Points)
2012–15	Crusaders	55	(272)
- Correct as of 214 June 2015
International career
Years	Team	Apps	(Points)
2013	New Zealand	3	(14)
- Correct as of 4 November 2013

Thomas James Taylor (born 11 March 1989) is a New Zealand rugby union footballer. He played as a second five-eighth or first five-eighth for the Crusaders in Super Rugby. and Canterbury in the ITM Cup. He can also play fullback.

He made his debut for the New Zealand national side, the All Blacks, in 2013.

== Career ==
In the 2009, affiliated with the Canterbury ITM side, Taylor was involved in the champion New Zealand Under 20 team along with Zac Guildford

In 2011 Taylor debuted for Canterbury against North Otago. He trained with the Crusaders and was part of the Canterbury squad that went on to win that year's ITM Cup Championship final against Waikato.

In November 2011 he was named in the Crusaders squad for 2012. In his first start, against the Cheetahs in March 2012, Taylor opened the Crusaders scoring with a penalty six minutes in. He had a successful game with the boot and ended up converting the game's final try, for Crusaders to win 28–21. The next week, playing at second five-eighth against the Lions, he kicked two penalties and three conversions and the Crusaders won 23–13. On 14 April he was back at first five-eighth to help the Crusaders end the Stormers unbeaten run. Taylor scored a try, converted it, and kicked eight penalties from eight attempts.

In 2013, Taylor made his debut for the All Blacks, starting ahead of Colin Slade at first five-eighth in the second Rugby Championship/Bledisloe Cup match against Australia after injuries to Aaron Cruden, Beauden Barrett and Dan Carter. He kicked four penalty goals and a conversion goal (14 points) to help the All Blacks to a 27–16 win at Wellington's Westpac Stadium.

In March 2015, Taylor announced that he would join French Top 14 Rugby Club Bayonne.

== Personal life ==
In 2010 Taylor was studying towards his Bachelor of Science in geography at the University of Canterbury.

Taylor's relatives include father Warwick, a second five-eighth, who played for Canterbury from 1982 to 1990 and the All Blacks from 1983 to 1988, and uncle Murray Taylor, a first five-eighth who played for the All Blacks in 1979 and 1980.
