= Jean-Charles Orso =

French rugby union player (born 1958)

- Born: 6 January 1958 (age 68) Cannes, France
- Height: 6 ft 3 in (191 cm)
- Weight: 231 lb (105 kg)

Rugby union career
- Position: Lock
International career
Years	Team	Apps	(Points)
1982–88	France	11	(0)

Jean-Charles Orso (born 6 January 1958) is a French former rugby union international

Orso, born in Cannes, grew up on an orchard farm outside the city which was operated by his father and uncle, who were pre-war emigrants from Liguria, Italy.

A strong, tall lock, Orso started his senior career with RC Nice, playing in the club's only championship final in 1983, which they lost to AS Béziers. He won a Brennus Shield with RC Toulon in 1987. He was capped 11 times for France during the 1980s and took part in four Five Nations campaigns, as well as the 1984 tour of New Zealand. It has been speculated that his omission from the 1987 World Cup came on orders of the French federation president Albert Ferrasse, to placate someone in Nice who was unhappy that Orso had transferred to RC Toulon.

== See also ==
- List of France national rugby union players
