= Michael Scott (rugby union, born 1969) =

- Full name: Michael William Scott
- Born: 27 March 1969 (age 57) Auckland, New Zealand
- Height: 5 ft 10 in (178 cm)
- Weight: 187 lb (85 kg)

Rugby union career
- Position: Half-back
Provincial / State sides
Years	Team	Apps	(Points)
1991–92	Auckland	5	(0)
1993–98	Counties Manukau	79	(100)
2004	King Country	9	(10)
Super Rugby
Years	Team	Apps	(Points)
1996–98	Blues	10	(0)

Michael William Scott (born 27 March 1969) is a New Zealand former professional rugby union player.

Born in Auckland, Scott was a New Zealand Māori and New Zealand Divisional XV representative half-back. He played most of his provincial rugby with Counties Manukau, appearing in 79 games from 1993 to 1998. A foundation player with the Auckland Blues, Scott was in the side that won the inaugural Super 12 title in 1996. He was an assistant coach at King Country and got called upon to make a brief playing comeback in 2004.

Scott is a business owner in the Auckland region.
