= Pukekohe High School =

Location
- 142 Harris St; Pukekohe, Auckland; 37°12′16″S 174°54′16″E

Information
- Type: State co-ed Secondary (Year 9–13)
- Motto: "Honour Right Duty"
- Established: 1921
- Ministry of Education Institution no.: 103
- Principal: Murray Saunders
- Enrolment: 1,938 (July 2026)
- Socio-economic decile: 6N
- Website: pukekohehighschool.nz

Pukekohe High School is a high school in Pukekohe in the Auckland Region of New Zealand.

== Enrolment ==
As of July 2026, Pukekohe High School has a roll of 1,938 students, of which 508 (26.2%) identify as Māori.

As of 2026, the school has an Equity Index of 465, placing it amongst schools whose students have average socioeconomic barriers to achievement (roughly equivalent to deciles 5 and 6 under the former socio-economic decile system).

== Houses ==
The five houses of Pukekohe High School are as follows:

- Pūriri house, also known as red house.
- Mataī house, also known as black house.
- Māhoe house, also known as blue house.
- Mānuka house, also known as yellow house.
- Tītoki house, also known as green house.

== Notable staff ==
- Tui Flower — food writer
- Merv Wellington — politician

== Notable alumni ==
- Mike Brewer – rugby union player
- David Dixon – American football player
- Phil Healey – rugby union coach
- Rod Ketels – rugby union player
- Liam Lawson – motor racing driver
- Des Morrison – politician
- Eric Murray – rower
- Geoffrey Sim – politician
- Helen Thayer – explorer
- Jimmy Tupou – rugby union player
