= Matamata College =

Location
- Firth St, Matamata; 37.8173°S 175.7699°E

Information
- Type: Co-ed state secondary, year 9–13
- Motto: Quality Education for All
- Established: 1918
- Ministry of Education Institution no.: 124
- Principal: Angela Sharples
- Enrolment: 830
- Equity Index: 479
- Website: matamatacollege.school.nz

Matamata College is a co-educational state secondary school located in Matamata, New Zealand.

== History ==
The college was declared open on 11 February 1924 by the Minister for Education, James Parr.

In July 2012, a student was killed by a train after he ran out from several trees alongside the tracks outside the school. In March 2025, a 13-year-old girl named Sarie Morton was struck by a train shortly after class at 3:15 PM. Consequently, the mayor of Matamata-Piako, Adrienne Wilcock, stated that she was assisting authorities in regard to implementing protective measures, such as a trackside fences or barriers.

== Enrolment ==
As of July 2026, Matamata College has a roll of 830 students, of which 231 (27.8%) identify as Māori. The school has an Equity Index of 479, placing it amongst schools whose students have above average socioeconomic barriers to achievement (roughly equivalent to decile 4 under the former socio-economic decile system).

== Notable alumni ==
- Anne Taylor – netball player
- Brendon Leonard – rugby union player
- Casey Williams – netball player
- Catherine Tizard – Governor-General
- Craig Innes – rugby union and rugby league player
- Judith Collins – politician; former National leader
- Julie Hawkes – squash player
- Lyn Grime – Olympic hurdler
- Murray Taylor – rugby union player
- Nicola Browne – cricketer
- Richard Nunns – Māori traditional instrumentalist of Pākehā heritage
- Shane Dye – jockey
- Warwick Taylor – rugby union player

== Historic imagery ==
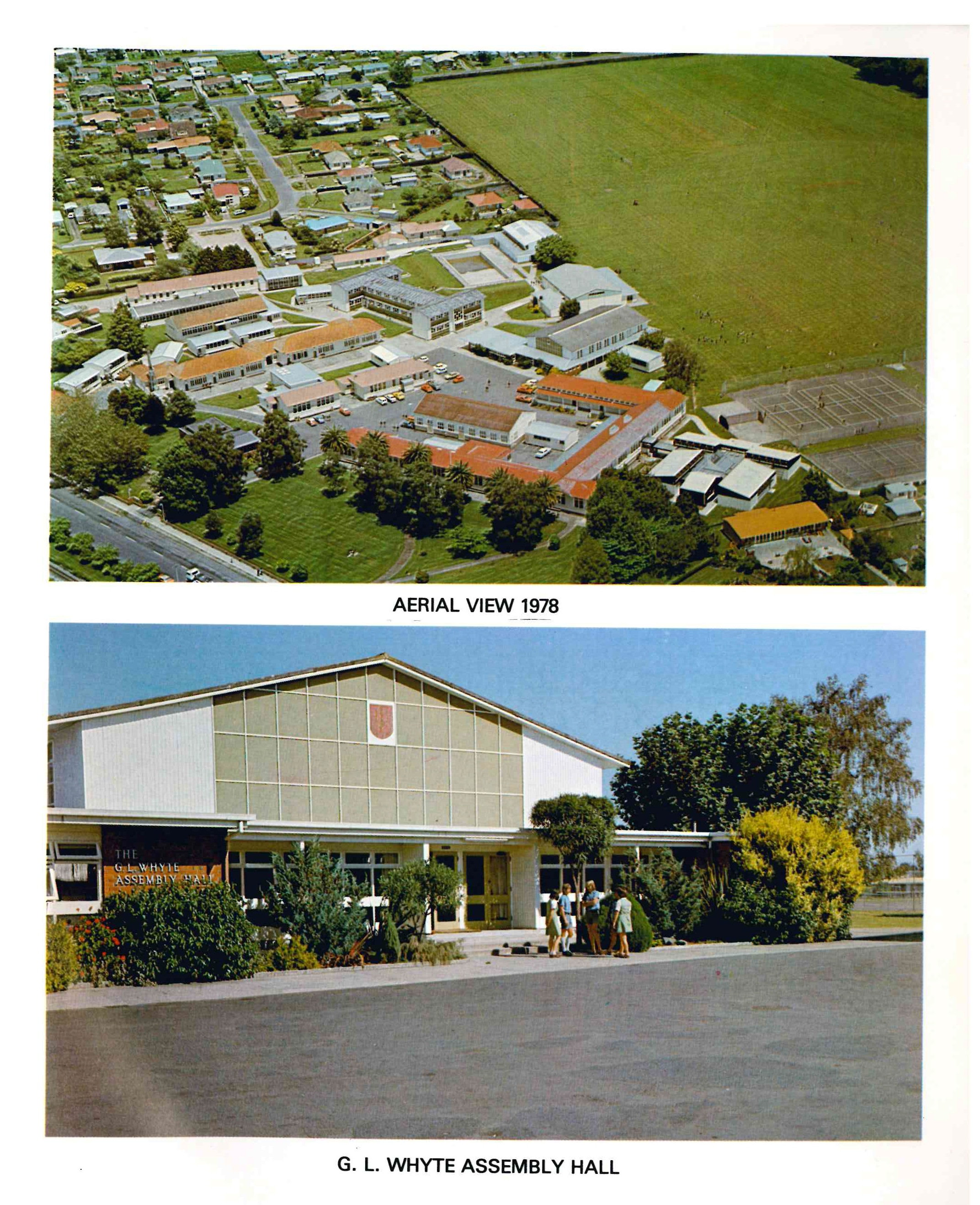
Aerial and front view of Matamata College in 1978.

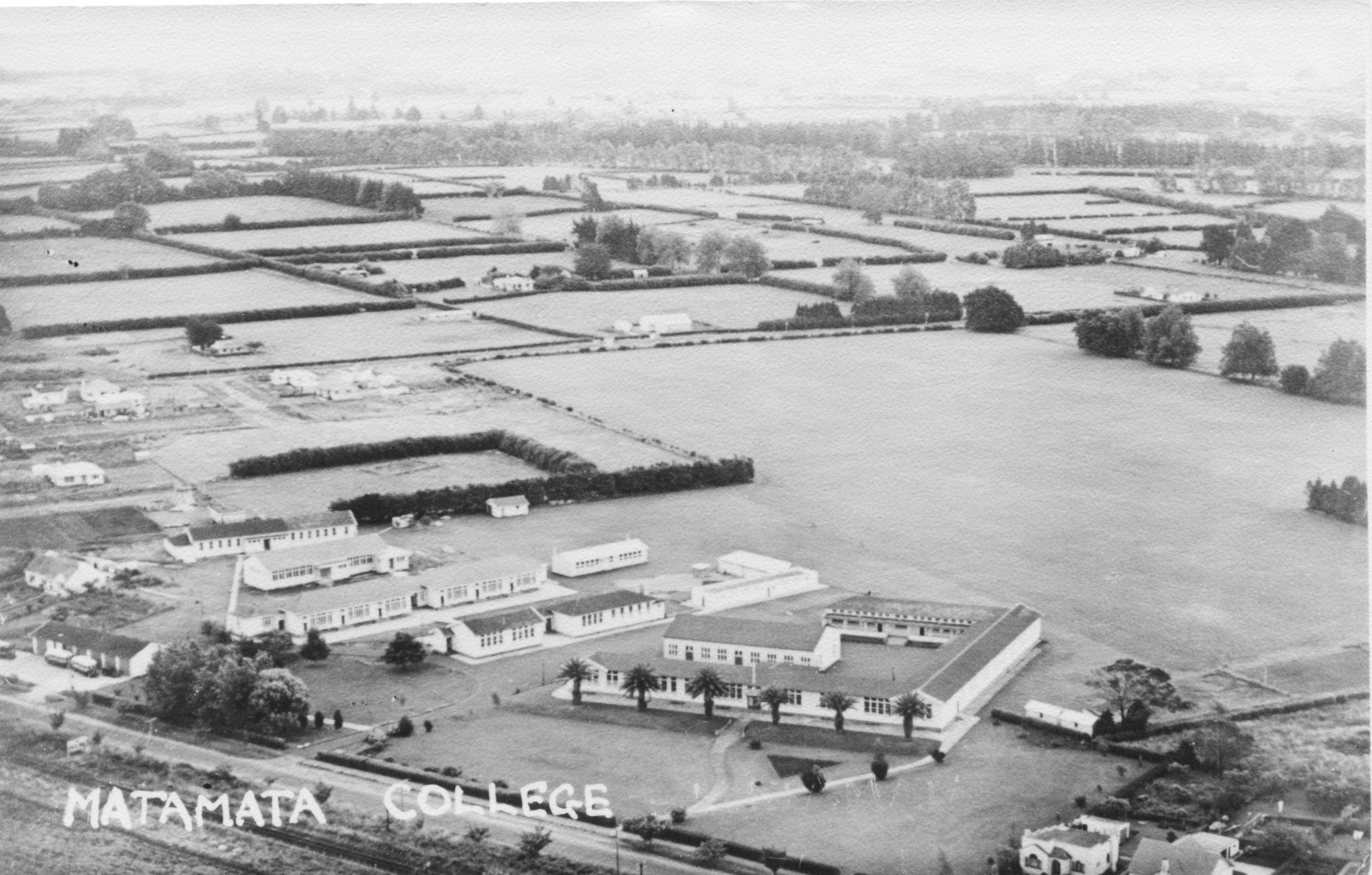
Aerial view of Matamata College in the 1940s

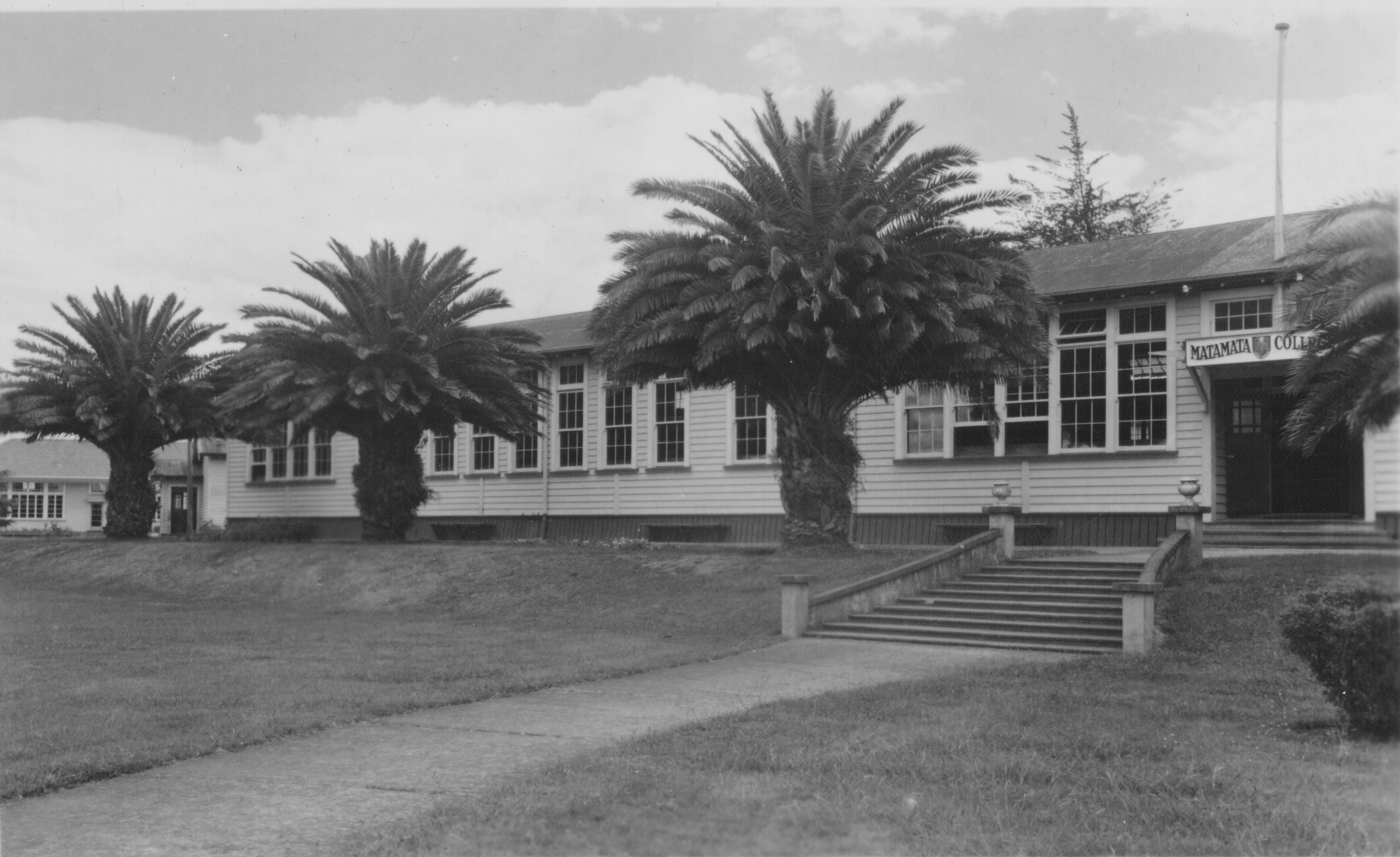
Front of Matamata College in the 1950s
