= Mick Cossey =

- Born: Raymond Reginald Cossey; 21 January 1935 Papakura, New Zealand
- Died: 24 May 1986 (aged 51) Drury, New Zealand
- Height: 1.78 m (5 ft 10 in)
- Weight: 84 kg (185 lb)
- School: Otahuhu College
- Occupation: Schoolteacher

Rugby union career
- Position(s): Second five-eighth Centre; Wing
Provincial / State sides
Years	Team	Apps	(Points)
1953–54	Auckland	5	
1956–57	Poverty Bay	18	
1958–62	Counties	51	
International career
Years	Team	Apps	(Points)
1958	New Zealand	1	(0)

Raymond Reginald "Mick" Cossey (21 January 1935 – 24 May 1986) was a New Zealand rugby union player. A second five-eighth and centre, Cossey represented Auckland, Poverty Bay, and Counties at a provincial level. He played just one match for the New Zealand national side, the All Blacks: the first test against the touring Australian side in 1958.

A schoolteacher, Cossey taught at Patutahi School, near Gisborne, in the mid-1950s, where one of his students was future All Black Ian Kirkpatrick.

Cossey was killed in an accident at a railway crossing in 1986, and his ashes were buried in Papakura Cemetery.
