= Howell Davies (rugby union, born 1959) =

- Born: 6 June 1959 (age 67) Pyle, Wales

Rugby union career
- Position: Fullback
International career
Years	Team	Apps	(Points)
1984	Wales	4	(39)

Howell Davies (born 6 June 1959) is a Welsh former rugby union international.

Davies, raised in the village of Pyle, was a fullback and played his club rugby for Bridgend RFC, which included a prolific 422-point season in 1983/84. He earned all four of his Wales caps in the 1984 Five Nations Championship and was their top scorer with 39 points, to set a Welsh tournament record. His career was then curtailed by a series of knee injuries and by 1986 he had been forced into a premature retirement at the age of 27.

== See also ==
- List of Wales national rugby union players
