= Geoff Hines =

- Born: Geoffrey Robert Hines; 10 October 1960 (age 66) Tokoroa, New Zealand
- Height: 1.91 m (6 ft 3 in)
- Weight: 91 kg (201 lb)
- School: St Paul's Collegiate School

Rugby union career
- Position: Flanker
Provincial / State sides
Years	Team	Apps	(Points)
1979–82, 1984	Waikato	63	
1983	Natal		
International career
Years	Team	Apps	(Points)
1979	New Zealand Colts		
1980	New Zealand	1	(0)

Geoffrey Robert Hines (born 10 October 1960) is a former New Zealand rugby union player. A flanker, Hines represented Waikato at a provincial level, and was a member of the New Zealand national side, the All Blacks, in 1980. He played 12 matches on the tours of Australia and Fiji and North America and Wales, including a single international, against Australia at Sydney.
