= Jacques Bégu =

French rugby union player (born 1957)

- Born: 22 April 1957 (age 69) Dax, France
- Height: 5 ft 10 in (178 cm)
- Weight: 172 lb (78 kg)

Rugby union career
- Position: Wing
International career
| Years | Team | Apps | (Points) |
| 1982–84 | France | 3 | (8) |

Jacques Bégu (born 22 April 1957) is a French former rugby union international.

Bégu, a winger, was capped in three Tests matches for France. He made his debut in 1982 against the touring Argentine team and scored a try after coming on as a substitute. His other two appearances came in the 1984 Five Nations Championship, earning a starting spot in place of injured winger Patrice Lagisquet for the final two matches. He played for hometown club US Dax from 1977 to 1990, winning one Challenge Yves du Manoir title.

== See also ==
- List of France national rugby union players
