= David Dixon (American football) =

New Zealand gridiron footballer (born 1969)

No. 71
- Position: Guard

Personal information
- Born: 5 January 1969 (age 57); Pukekohe, New Zealand
- Listed height: 6 ft 5 in (1.96 m)
- Listed weight: 343 lb (156 kg)

Career information
- High school: Pukekohe (NZ)
- College: Ricks College (1988–1989); Arizona State (1990–1991)
- NFL draft: 1992: 9th round, 232nd overall pick

Career history
- New England Patriots (1992)*; Minnesota Vikings (1992–1993)*; Dallas Cowboys (1993)*; Minnesota Vikings (1994–2004); San Francisco 49ers (2006)*
- * Offseason or practice squad member only

Career NFL statistics
- Games played: 152
- Games started: 134
- Fumble recoveries: 4
- Stats at Pro Football Reference

David Tukatahi Dixon (born 5 January 1969) is a New Zealand-born former professional football guard who played eleven professional seasons in the National Football League (NFL) and was the second Māori to play in professional football after Riki Ellison. He was selected 232nd overall by the New England Patriots in the ninth round of the 1992 NFL draft. He also earned a Super Bowl ring as part of the practice squad for the Dallas Cowboys, though practice squad players did not receive an actual ring.

== Early life ==
Dixon represented New Zealand in rugby at the high school level in 1985.

== College career ==
Dixon attended Arizona State University after transferring from Ricks College in Idaho. He first played American football in college after being an active rugby player.

== Professional career ==
Dixon wore number 71 while playing and starting for the Minnesota Vikings as an offensive lineman. He had two stints with the Vikings, with the second lasting 11 years (1994-2004). He was a vital part of the team's offensive unit and retired in 2004 after sustaining several injuries.

== Personal life ==
Dixon's daughter TeTori plays for the United States women's national volleyball team, and also was a key player for Burnsville (High School) in Minnesota.

Dixon became a United States Citizen in 1999.
