= Ray Dalton (rugby union) =

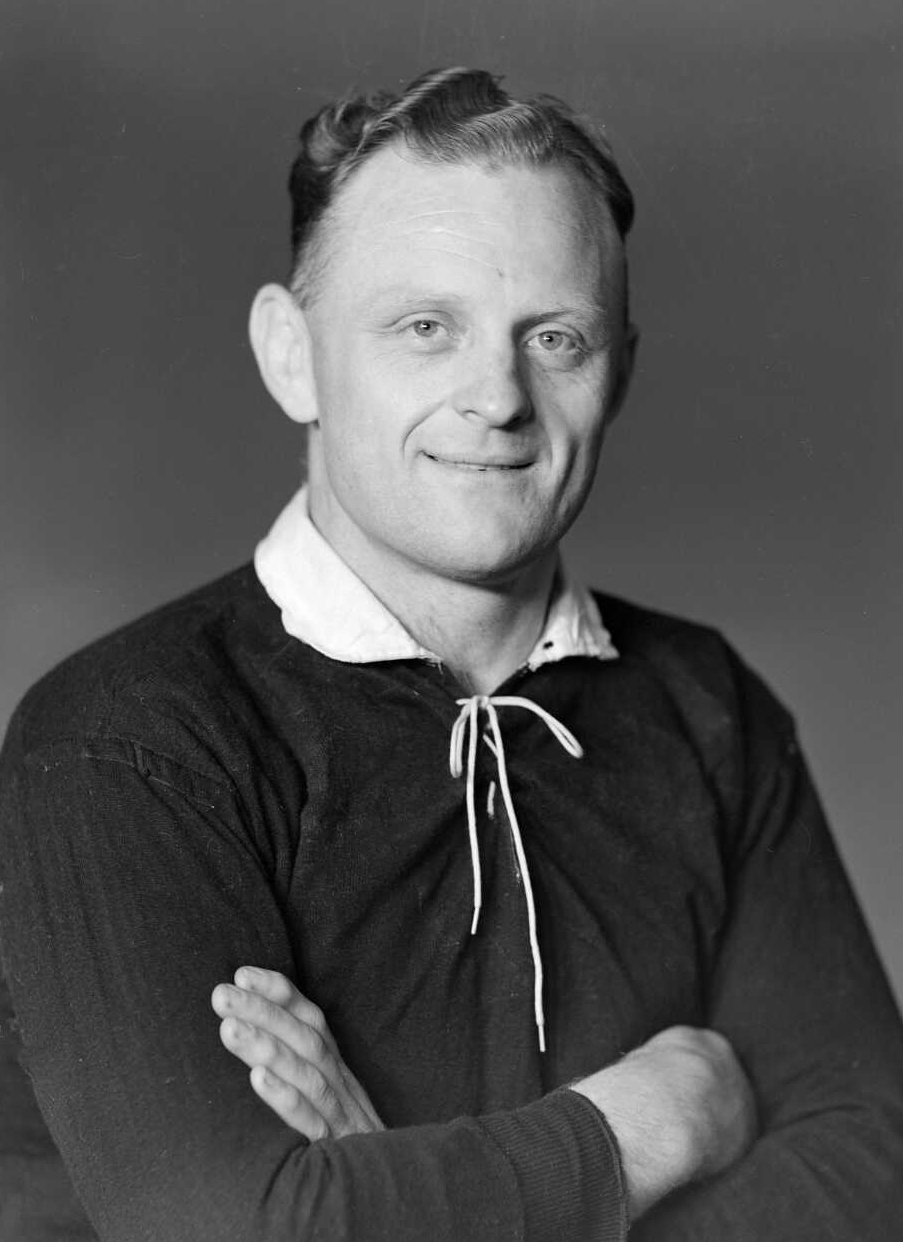
- Dalton in 1949
- Born: Raymond Alfred Dalton; 14 July 1919 Te Awamutu, New Zealand
- Died: 2 February 1997 (aged 77) Auckland, New Zealand
- Height: 1.80 m (5 ft 11 in)
- Weight: 92 kg (203 lb)
- School: Te Awamutu College
- Notable relative: Andy Dalton (son)
- Occupation: Advertising executive

Rugby union career
- Position: Prop
Provincial / State sides
| Years | Team | Apps | (Points) |
| 1946–48 | Wellington | 15 | |
| 1948–50 | Otago | 8 | |
International career
| Years | Team | Apps | (Points) |
| 1947–49 | New Zealand | 2 | (0) |

Raymond Alfred Dalton (14 July 1919 – 2 February 1997) was a New Zealand rugby union player. A prop, Dalton represented Wellington and Otago at a provincial level, and was a member of the New Zealand national side, the All Blacks, between 1947 and 1949. He played 20 matches—three as captain—for the All Blacks, including two internationals.

During World War II, Dalton served as a navigator with the Royal New Zealand Air Force, based in the United Kingdom. In August 1942 he was commissioned as an air observer with the rank of pilot officer, in February 1943 he was promoted to flying officer, and in August 1944 he gained the rank of flight lieutenant. While in the air force, Dalton played 31 first-class matches for services rugby teams.

Dalton died in Auckland on 2 February 1997, and his ashes were buried at Purewa Cemetery.
