= Tui Flower =

New Zealand food writer

Tui Flower QSM
- Born: Lucy Tui Hampton Flower; 23 November 1925; Matamata, New Zealand
- Died: 15 August 2017 (aged 91); Auckland, New Zealand
- Occupation: Food writer
- Known for: Cookery editor of New Zealand Woman's Weekly
- Spouse: Keith Thomas Aitken (m. 1980; died 1985)

Lucy Tui Hampton Aitken QSM (née Flower, 23 November 1925 – 15 August 2017), generally known as Tui Flower, was a pioneering New Zealand food writer. She has been described as "New Zealand's Julia Child".

== Early life and family ==
Born in Matamata on 23 November 1925, Flower was the daughter of Leonard Flower, a postmaster, and Constance Ruby Irene Flower (née Mincher). She grew up in Matamata and Tauranga, and received her secondary education at Epsom Girls' Grammar School, where she was a boarder. In 1944, she went on to study at the University of Otago, obtaining a Diploma of Home Science.

== Career ==
After leaving Otago, Flower taught home science at Pukekohe High School. In 1951, she travelled to the United States, where she attended a number of Cordon Bleu courses. She was awarded a bursary to study at the École hôtelière de Paris in 1954–55, and was subsequently employed by Unilever in Wellington as a home economist. In her nine years at Unilever she worked initially on laundry and cleaning products and packaging, and later on frozen, dehydrated and canned foods.

Visits to family in the United States exposed Flower to food journalism, and in 1965 she was appointed as the food editor of the New Zealand Woman's Weekly. She established New Zealand's first magazine-based test kitchen, using her scientific background for recipe testing and adapting traditional recipes for modern equipment and busy lives. Likened to the American food writer Julia Child, Flower is credited with helping New Zealanders move away from their traditional meat, potato and vegetable dinner, and was among those who popularised ingredients perceived as exotic, such as garlic, capsicum and avocado. When Flower retired from her role at the New Zealand Woman's Weekly, her test kitchen had a staff of nine.

In addition to her regular food editorial column and recipes in the Woman's Weekly, Flower contributed to the Auckland Star and the New Zealand Home Journal, and wrote or edited a number of cookbooks. In 1982, she established the Star–Woman's Weekly School of Cooking. Flower was instrumental in the formation of the New Zealand Guild of Food Writers in 1988, and served as its inaugural chair.

== Personal life ==
In 1980, Flower married Keith Thomas Aitken, who was editor of the Auckland Star newspaper from 1977 until his retirement in 1983. He died in February 1985.

== Honours ==
In the 1983 New Year Honours, Flower was awarded the Queen's Service Medal for public services. She was also a life member of the New Zealand Guild of Food Writers.

== Later life and death ==
In her retirement, Flower lived in the Auckland suburb of Mount Eden, in a house that had been owned by her maternal grandparents. She continued to write and edit cookbooks, and mentored many New Zealand food writers. In 1998 she published her autobiography, Self-raising Flower. She was still involved in the food industry in 2016, when she worked with Eggs Incorporated to promote World Egg Day.

Flower died in Auckland on 15 August 2017.

== Selected publications ==
- Flower, Tui (1968). Tui Flower's cookbook. Wellington: A.H. & A.W. Reed.
- Flower, Tui (1972). Tui Flower's modern hostess cook book. Wellington: Reed. ISBN 0589007122.
- Flower, Tui (1976). New Zealand Woman's Weekly favourite recipes. Auckland: Paul Hamlyn. ISBN 0727100866.
- Flower, Tui; Lonsdale, Neil (1977). William tells about food. Auckland: Shortland. ISBN 0868670219.
- Flower, Tui, ed. (1979). Fresh vegetable cooking. Auckland: Shortland.
- Flower, Tui, ed. (1981). Make it with milk: eighteen prize-winning recipes to make the most of fresh milk. Wellington: New Zealand Milk Promotion Council.
- Flower, Tui, ed. (1984). New Zealand woman's weekly cookbook. Auckland: Shortland Rigby. ISBN 0868672009.
- Flower, Tui (1985). Favourite meals. Auckland: Shortland. ISBN 0868673218.
- Flower, Tui (1985). Favourite preserves. Auckland: Shortland. ISBN 086867320X.
- Flower, Tui (1985). Lamb favourites. Auckland: Shortland. ISBN 0868673196.
- Flower, Tui, ed. (1990). New Zealand the beautiful cookbook. Willoughby: Weldon. ISBN 1875410228.
- Flower, Tui, ed. (1996). The cooks' collection: recipes from New Zealand's food writers. Auckland: C.J. Publishers. ISBN 0908808577.
- Flower, Tui (1998). Self-raising flower. Auckland: Viking. ISBN 0670883654.
