= Murray Taylor =

- Born: Murray Barton Taylor; 25 August 1956 (age 70) Hamilton, New Zealand
- Height: 1.78 m (5 ft 10 in)
- Weight: 76 kg (168 lb)
- School: Matamata College
- Notable relative(s): Warwick Taylor (brother); Tom Taylor (nephew)

Rugby union career
- Position: First five-eighth
Provincial / State sides
Years	Team	Apps	(Points)
1975–81	Waikato	53	
International career
Years	Team	Apps	(Points)
1979–80	New Zealand	7	(3)

Murray Barton Taylor (born 25 August 1956) is a retired rugby union player from New Zealand. He played thirty matches for the All Blacks in the late 1970s and early 1980s; seven of these were test matches. He is now living in the Waikato in New Zealand.
