= Brett Codlin =

NZ international rugby union player

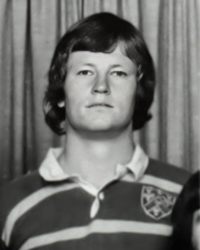
- Codlin in 1977
- Born: Brett William Codlin; 29 November 1956 (age 69) Pukekohe, New Zealand
- Height: 1.85 m (6 ft 1 in)
- Weight: 87 kg (192 lb)
- School: King's College
- University: Lincoln College

Rugby union career
- Position: Fullback
Provincial / State sides
Years	Team	Apps	(Points)
1979	Canterbury	4	
1980–84	Counties	28	
International career
Years	Team	Apps	(Points)
1980	New Zealand	3	(23)

Brett William Codlin (born 29 November 1956) is a former New Zealand rugby union player. A full-back, Codlin represented Canterbury and Counties at a provincial level, and was a member of the New Zealand national side, the All Blacks, in 1980. He played 13 matches for the All Blacks including three internationals.
