= Bruce Smith (rugby union) =

- Born: Bruce Warwick Smith; 4 January 1959 (age 67) Wairoa, New Zealand
- Height: 1.82 m (6 ft 0 in)
- Weight: 84 kg (185 lb)
- School: Reporoa College

Rugby union career
- Position: Wing
Provincial / State sides
Years	Team	Apps	(Points)
1979–84	Waikato	76	
1987–89	Bay of Plenty		
International career
Years	Team	Apps	(Points)
1983–84	New Zealand	3	(4)
National sevens team
Years	Team		Comps
1983	New Zealand 7s		

Bruce Warwick Smith (born 4 January 1959) is a former New Zealand rugby union player. A wing, Smith represented Waikato and Bay of Plenty at a provincial level, and was a member of the New Zealand national side, the All Blacks, in 1983 and 1984. He played 10 matches for the All Blacks including three internationals.
