= Nicky Allen =

New Zealand rugby union player

- Born: Nicholas Houghton Allen; 30 August 1958 Auckland, New Zealand
- Died: 7 October 1984 (aged 26) Wollongong, New South Wales, Australia
- Height: 1.75 m (5 ft 9 in)
- Weight: 73 kg (161 lb)
- School: Auckland Grammar School
- University: University of Auckland

Rugby union career
- Position: First five-eighth
Provincial / State sides
Years	Team	Apps	(Points)
1978, 80, 83	Auckland		
1980	Counties		
International career
Years	Team	Apps	(Points)
1978	New Zealand Colts		
- NZ Universities
1980	New Zealand	2	(4)

Nicholas Houghton Allen (30 August 1958 – 7 October 1984) was a New Zealand rugby union player. A first five-eighth, Allen represented Auckland and Counties at a provincial level. He played nine matches, including two tests, for the New Zealand national side, the All Blacks, in 1980. He died in Wollongong in 1984 from head injuries sustained in a club rugby match, and he is buried at Purewa Cemetery in Auckland.
