= Rod Ketels =

- Born: Rodney Clive Ketels; 11 November 1954 (age 72) Papakura, New Zealand
- Height: 1.83 m (6 ft 0 in)
- Weight: 115 kg (254 lb)
- School: Pukekohe High School

Rugby union career
- Position: Prop
Provincial / State sides
Years	Team	Apps	(Points)
1974–87	Counties	173	(68)
International career
Years	Team	Apps	(Points)
1978–81	New Zealand	16	(0)

Rodney Clive Ketels (born 11 November 1954) Ketels represented counties at provincial level on 173 occasions from 1974 to 1987 3rd on the all-time list of games played for the union Ketels was a member of the champion Counties NPC team in 1979. Ketels was selected for the All Blacks for the 1978 UK grand slam tour but was unable to travel due to injury. He went on to make 16 appearances for the All Blacks and played a total of 212 first class matches.
