= Michael Knight (rugby union) =

New Zealand rugby union player

- Full name: Michael Orton Knight
- Born: 20 May 1945 (age 81) Auckland, New Zealand
- Height: 1.80 m (5 ft 11 in)
- Weight: 84 kg (185 lb)
- School: Hawera Technical College
- Occupation: Business development consultant

Rugby union career
- Position: Wing
Provincial / State sides
Years	Team	Apps	(Points)
1965–1968	Counties	29	(21)
1969–1970	Wellington	27	(51)
International career
Years	Team	Apps	(Points)
1968	New Zealand	0	(0)

Michael Orton Knight (born 20 May 1945) is a New Zealand former rugby union international.

Knight, born in Auckland, is related to All Blacks Arthur and Laurie Knight, who were cousins of his father Wally. He was educated at Hawera Technical College and was a national junior 100 yards sprint champion.

A speedy winger, Knight played his representative rugby for Counties and Wellington. He was a member of the All Blacks on their 1968 tour of Australia and Fiji, scoring six tries in eight uncapped tour matches.

== See also ==
- List of New Zealand national rugby union players
