= Jacques Gratton =

France international rugby union player

- Born: 29 November 1957 (age 68) Lectoure, France
- Height: 6 ft 2 in (188 cm)
- Weight: 203 lb (92 kg)

Rugby union career
- Position: Flanker
International career
Years	Team	Apps	(Points)
1984–86	France	10	(0)

Jacques Gratton (born 29 November 1957) is a French former international rugby union player.

Born in Lectoure, Gratton was a flanker and played his early senior rugby with FC Auch.

Gratton joined SU Agen in 1981 and was a member of two Brennus Shield-winning sides during his time at the club, while gaining 10 caps with the France national team. He won his first cap against the All Blacks at Eden Park in 1984.

== See also ==
- List of France national rugby union players
