= Dave Loveridge =

- Born: David Steven Loveridge; 22 April 1952 (age 74) Stratford, New Zealand
- Height: 1.75 m (5 ft 9 in)
- Weight: 73 kg (161 lb)
- School: Inglewood High School

Rugby union career
- Position: Halfback
Provincial / State sides
Years	Team	Apps	(Points)
1973	Auckland	2	
1974–86	Taranaki	136	
International career
Years	Team	Apps	(Points)
1978–85	New Zealand	24	(12)

David Steven Loveridge (born 22 April 1952) is an All Black of the late 1970s and early 1980s, known in his time as the greatest halfback in the world.

== Life and career ==
Loveridge was born in 1952, in Stratford, New Zealand, to Horace and Margaret Loveridge. He grew up during the golden age of Taranaki rugby, with the provincial side holding the Ranfurly Shield for two tenures in 1957–1959, and 1963–1965. He played age-grade representative rugby for Taranaki at the age of 12.

The Loveridge family owned a pig farm in Tariki south of Inglewood, and Loveridge attended Inglewood High School for his secondary education. He worked for a bank after leaving school, and in 1972 the bank transferred him to Auckland. While there he was selected for the Auckland University club team, and soon caught the eye of the provincial selectors. He played two games for Auckland, but after a 34-3 loss to North Auckland, in which he was marking All Black veteran Sid Going, Loveridge was discarded from the team.

In 1974 Loveridge married his wife Janine, returned to Tariki to run the family farm, played for Inglewood seniors and secured the halfback position in the Taranaki team. The following year he was selected for the Junior All Blacks, and in 1977 was given his first All Black trial. In 1978 he was reserve All Black halfback for the three-match series against the Wallabies in New Zealand, but didn’t get on the field. He finally got the chance to don the black jersey in the tour to Great Britain at the end of the year, and on 21 October 1978 made his debut against Cardiff at Cardiff Arms Park. He played his first test match when first-choice halfback Mark Donaldson was stung with an ankle injury and ruled out of the match against Wales. While New Zealand almost lost that match, only winning because of Andy Haden's famed lineout dive, Loveridge played a competent game. Donaldson remained first choice for the home season of 1979, but Loveridge finally gained the edge and secured the test matches against England and Scotland at the end of the year.

Loveridge went on to play 54 matches for the All Blacks, 24 of which were tests. In 1980 Graham Mourie and Andy Dalton were unavailable for the tour of Australia, and Loveridge was selected as captain. Loveridge was most renowned for his performance in the second test against the touring British Lions on 18 June 1983, at Athletic Park in Wellington. According to Lindsay Knight, for the New Zealand Rugby Museum,

"In difficult conditions Loveridge was the perfect complement to an All Black pack which battling into a gale took charge of the ultra confident Lions in the second spell.

Loveridge displayed every aspect of the halfback's art, passing accurately, kicking effectively and running with judgement. In a match where he took every correct option he then scampered over for the match's only try in the All Blacks' 9–0 win.

Even the most exacting judges declared Loveridge had produced one of the greatest displays of all time and agreed with the assessment of All Black coach Bryce Rope that this had been "Trapper's Test.""

In 1984 Loveridge suffered a serious knee injury, which hampered his game for the rest of his career. He joined the New Zealand Cavaliers for the rebel tour of South Africa in 1986, which proved to be his final appearance in the black jersey. He retired from New Zealand first class rugby at the end of that year, at age 34, after 54 matches for the All Blacks and 136 games for Taranaki.

Loveridge remains on the family pig farm in Taranaki with his wife Janine to this day, and is father to three adult children. He is employed as a staff coach by the New Zealand Rugby Union, has coached the Taranaki under-23 development team, been on three tours with the New Zealand youth team, spent two years coaching the Wellington Hurricanes under-20 development side and been a selector for the New Zealand under-19s.

Gordon Bray often referred to him as "the pig farmer from Taranaki" during his commentary broadcasts.
