= Allan Hewson =

New Zealand rugby union player

- Born: 6 June 1954 (age 72) Lower Hutt
- Height: 1.80 m (5 ft 11 in)
- Weight: 73 kg (161 lb)
- School: Hutt Valley High School

Rugby union career
- Position: Fullback
Amateur team(s)
Years	Team	Apps	(Points)
- Petone
Provincial / State sides
Years	Team	Apps	(Points)
– 1986	Wellington		
International career
Years	Team	Apps	(Points)
1979–1984	New Zealand	19	(201)

Allan Roy Hewson (born 6 June 1954) represented the New Zealand All Blacks in 19 Rugby Union internationals between 1981 and 1984. Hewson played at fullback. Since his retirement from international rugby Hewson has continued to be involved with Wellington rugby.

== All Black career ==
Hewson was born in Lower Hutt, New Zealand. He played five tour matches in England, Scotland and Italy in 1979, but was not selected for the tests, as coach Eric Watson did not regard him highly.

His test debut came about as a result of injuries to other players, and was on 13 June 1981 v Scotland (at Carisbrook in Dunedin), which the All Blacks won 11–4. His final appearance was on 21 July 1984 v Australia (in Sydney), which the All Blacks lost 16–9.

At 1.8 m (5 ft 11 in) and just 73 kg in weight, Hewson was extremely slight by international Rugby Union standards, and endured scepticism from the New Zealand public throughout his rugby career. Despite his stature, Hewson's international record speaks for itself: 201 points (at the time, just 6 short of the prevailing New Zealand test record), a then world record haul for points scored in a single test, and a starring role in the notorious 1981 Springbok tour. With the series tied at one all, in the last few seconds of the third and final test, New Zealand were awarded a long range penalty. In rugby journalist Jon Collins' words "the hopes of a nation rested on Allan's narrow shoulders". Hewson successfully converted the penalty and sealed a famous New Zealand victory in the series.

He was dropped in favour of Robbie Deans when he was only 6 points short of Don Clarke's point scoring record.

He also played cricket, and was selected as a Wicketkeeper/batsman for Wellington for one first-class season.

== Current career ==
In November 2007, Hewson was reported to have had commenced a role as Manager of the Ken Gray Rugby Academy within the Petone Rugby Club in Wellington.

== See also ==
Photo of Hewson on the field with the All Blacks in 1981
