= Victor Simpson =

- Born: Victor Lenard James Simpson; 26 February 1960 (age 66) Gisborne, New Zealand
- Height: 1.80 m (5 ft 11 in)
- Weight: 84 kg (185 lb)
- School: Gisborne Boys' High School
- University: University of Canterbury
- Notable relative: Stephen Brett (stepson)

Rugby union career
- Position: Centre
Provincial / State sides
Years	Team	Apps	(Points)
1979	Poverty Bay	3	
1980–90	Canterbury	118	
International career
Years	Team	Apps	(Points)
1980	New Zealand Colts	3	
1981–82	New Zealand Māori		
1982	NZ Universities	1	
1985	New Zealand	2	(0)

Victor Lenard James Simpson (born 26 February 1960) is a former New Zealand rugby union player. A centre, Simpson represented Poverty Bay briefly and then Canterbury at a provincial level, and was a member of the New Zealand national side, the All Blacks, in 1985. He played four matches for the All Blacks including two internationals against Argentina.

Simpson is the stepfather of rugby player Stephen Brett.
