= Jean-Patrick Lescarboura =

France international rugby union player & coach

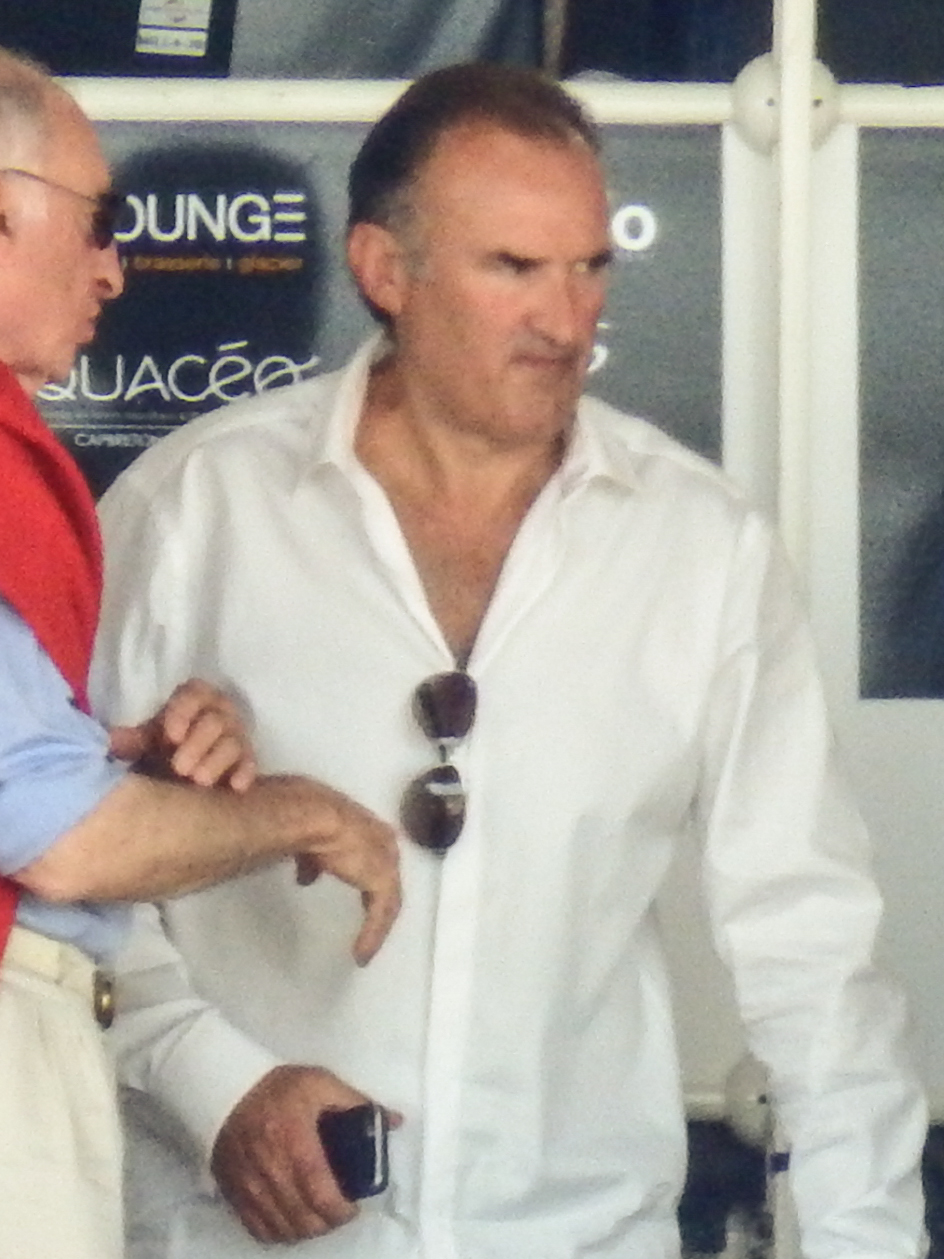
Jean-Patrick Lescarboura in 2015.

Jean-Patrick Lescarboura (born Monein, Pyrénées-Atlantiques, 19 January 1961) is a former French rugby union footballer and coach. His position was fly-half.

== Club career ==
Lescarboura first team was SA Monein. He spent afterwards his career at US Dax, from 1980–81 to 1992–93, where he won the Challenge Yves du Manoir, in 1982, and lost the final in 1988.

One of the best players of his generation, known by his amazing kick, he had to face several injuries, which prevented him from playing in the first 1987 Rugby World Cup.

== International career ==
Lescarboura won 28 caps for France, from 1982 to 1990, scoring 6 tries, 19 conversions, 31 penalties and 15 drop goals, reaching an aggregate of 200 points. He holds the national record of his country with 15 drop goals. He played four times at the Five Nations, in 1982, 1984, 1985 and 1988, being a member of the winning team the last time, ex-aequo with Wales. On 2 February 1985, he scored a record of 3 drop goals against England in a 9–9 draw, in a game for the 1985 Five Nations Championship. The French fly-half also scored 2 tries against New Zealand at 23 June 1984, at a 31–18 loss, an international record against the All Blacks.

== Coach career ==
He left competition in 1993. He would be later the coach of US Dax, from 1996–97 to 1997–98, and from 2011–12 to 2012–13.
