= Rob Ackerman (rugby) =

Wales international dual-code rugby footballer

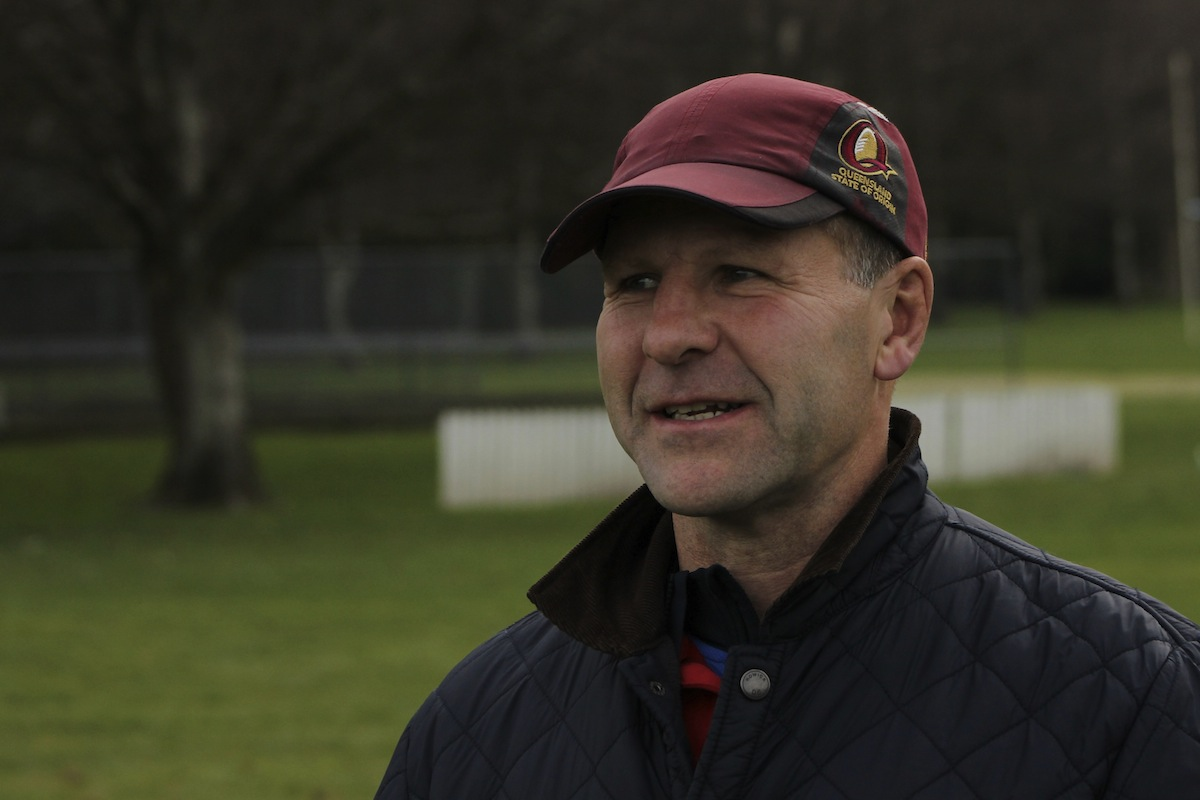
- Ackerman in 2013, watching the St Pat's Silverstream 2nd XV beat Wellington College
- Full name: Robert Angus Ackerman
- Born: 2 March 1961 (age 65) Ebbw Vale, Wales

Rugby union career
- Position: Centre
Senior career
Years	Team	Apps	(Points)
1979–1982	Newport RFC	76	(116)
1985-1986	Cardiff RFC	18	(0)
1982–1986	London Welsh RFC		
International career
Years	Team	Apps	(Points)
1980-1985	Wales	22	(4)
1983	British Lions	2	(0)
- Rugby league career

Playing information
- Position: Centre, Second-row, Loose forward/Lock
Club
Years	Team	Pld	T	G	FG	P
1986–1990	Whitehaven	105	32	0	0	128
1990–1991	Leeds	14	4	0	0	16
1991–1992	Carlisle	31	4	0	0	16
1992–1993	Salford	11	0	0	0	0
1990–1991	Ryedale-York	3	1	0	0	4
	Total	164	41	0	0	164
Representative
Years	Team	Pld	T	G	FG	P
1991–1993	Wales	5	2	0	0	8

Robert Angus Ackerman (born 2 March 1961) is a Welsh former dual-code international rugby union and rugby league footballer. In 1983 he toured New Zealand with the British and Irish Lions whilst playing for London Welsh RFC. A centre, he also played club rugby for Newport RFC and Cardiff RFC. He was educated at Christ College Brecon.

He made his Welsh debut on 1 November 1980 against the All Blacks at Cardiff, at the age of 19. He also played rugby league, turning professional on 13 April 1986 when he signed for Whitehaven in Cumbria. He went on to play for Leeds, Carlisle, and finished his rugby league at Salford in 1993. He taught at Christ's College, Christchurch, New Zealand and coached the 1st XV in 2008. In 2012, Ackerman taught Physical Education at St Patrick's College, Silverstream, New Zealand. Ackerman was also the coach of the Silverstream 1st XV rugby team, leading the team to victory at the 2012 Wellington Premier 1 Finals. He moved to live and work in Melbourne in February 2017, as the Director of Coaching for Rugby at Haileybury College, and is currently a Casual Relief Teacher in Regional Victoria, Australia.
