= Mark Shaw (rugby union) =

New Zealand rugby player (born 1956)

- Born: Mark William Shaw; 23 May 1956 (age 70) Palmerston North, New Zealand
- Height: 1.88 m (6 ft 2 in)
- Weight: 95 kg (209 lb)
- School: Kāpiti College

Rugby union career
- Position: Flanker
Provincial / State sides
Years	Team	Apps	(Points)
1975–77	Horowhenua		
1978–85	Manawatu	87	
1986–88	Hawke's Bay	21	(30)
International career
Years	Team	Apps	(Points)
1980–86	New Zealand	30	(20)
Coaching career
- Years: Team
- 2000–01: Hawke's Bay

Mark William Shaw (born 23 May 1956) is a former New Zealand rugby union player. Nicknamed "Cowboy", Shaw was a flanker who represented Horowhenua, Manawatu and Hawke's Bay provincially and the All Blacks internationally. He was educated at Kāpiti College.

Shaw was selected for the All Blacks' tour of Australia in 1980, playing in all three tests, and scoring three tries in one of those matches. He toured North America and Wales later that year. Shaw played a total of 68 matches for the All Blacks, 30 of them test matches.

Shaw was appointed as an All Black selector in 2002.
