= Andy Dalton (rugby union) =

New Zealand rugby union footballer and coach (born 1951)

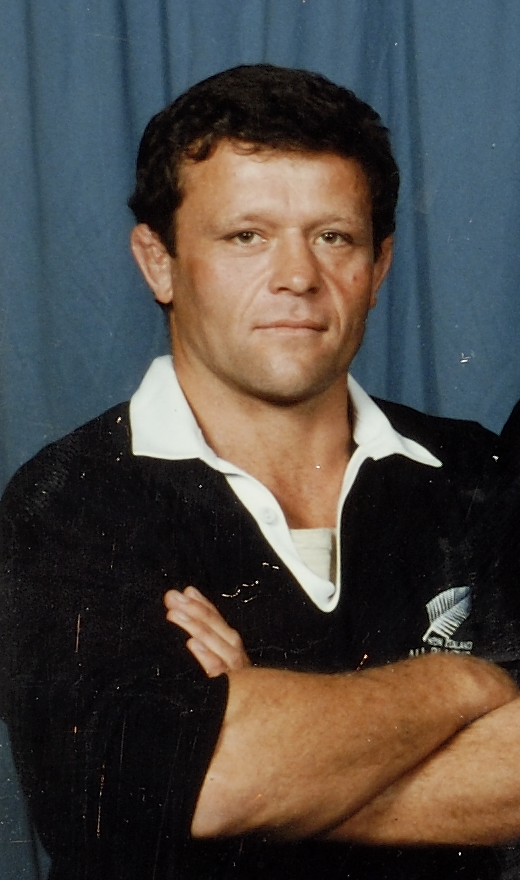
- Dalton in 1987
- Born: Andrew Grant Dalton; 16 November 1951 (age 74) Dunedin, New Zealand
- Height: 1.78 m (5 ft 10 in)
- Weight: 93 kg (205 lb)
- School: Selwyn College, Auckland
- Notable relative: Ray Dalton (father)
- Occupation(s): Company manager and director CEO Auckland Rugby

Rugby union career
- Position: Hooker
Provincial / State sides
Years	Team	Apps	(Points)
1976–82	North Island XV		
1975–85	Counties		
International career
Years	Team	Apps	(Points)
1977–85	New Zealand	35	(12)
Coaching career
- Years: Team
- 1989–91: Counties

Andrew Grant Dalton (born 16 November 1951) is a former New Zealand rugby union player. He captained the national team, the All Blacks, 17 times in tests. He is a second-generation All Black; his father Ray Dalton played in two All Blacks tests in the late 1940s.

== Early years ==
Although born in Dunedin, he was schooled at Selwyn College in Auckland (not to be confused with Selwyn College at the University of Otago), playing for the school's first team in 1968 and 1969 as a prop. He then returned to the South Island, enrolling at Lincoln College (then a part of the University of Canterbury) to study for a Bachelor of Agricultural Science. While there, he converted to hooker, and represented Canterbury at under-20 and senior reserve level.

After graduating, he returned to Auckland, playing for the senior B side at the Eastern club. In 1975, he moved to Bombay to start a career as a farm adviser, and won representative selection for the first time at Counties. The following year, which was the first of the National Provincial Championship (the predecessor to today's Air New Zealand Cup), he was named captain at Counties.

== All Blacks ==
Dalton earned his first All Blacks cap during their 1977 tour of France. He also played all four tests on their successful Grand Slam tour of Great Britain and Ireland in 1978, scoring the only try in their encounter with Ireland.

By 1981, he had become the regular All Blacks hooker, and captained the side for the first time when Graham Mourie was unavailable for the series against South Africa. Dalton became the full-time captain upon Mourie's 1982 retirement, most notably leading the All Blacks against the Lions during their 1983 tour. He was chosen as captain for their aborted 1985 tour of South Africa, and went on to captain the unofficial Cavaliers tour of South Africa in 1986. He suffered a broken jaw In the second match of the tour and played no more rugby that season. Dalton was one of the most successful All Blacks captains in history, victorious in 15 of his 17 tests as captain.

He was named captain of the side that would go on to win the inaugural 1987 Rugby World Cup, but suffered an injury in a practice session that ruled him out of the tournament, leaving the honour of lifting the Webb Ellis Cup to David Kirk.

== After rugby ==
After his retirement from rugby immediately after the 1987 World Cup, he continued his career in agriculture for a time, but later became a corporate manager. He coached Counties from 1989 to 1991, and was president of the New Zealand Rugby Union from 1999 to 2000. He is now the CEO of the Auckland Rugby Football Union, having also been CEO of the Auckland Blues until those roles were separated in 2014, and operates a farm in the Bombay Hills south of Auckland.

Sporting positions
Preceded by Graham Mourie	All Blacks captain 1982–1985	Succeeded by Jock Hobbs
