= Jock Hobbs =

New Zealand rugby union player and administrator

Jock Hobbs CNZM
- Born: Michael James Bowie Hobbs; 15 February 1960 Christchurch, New Zealand
- Died: 13 March 2012 (aged 52) Wellington, New Zealand
- Height: 1.85 m (6 ft 1 in)
- Weight: 92 kg (203 lb)
- School: Christ's College
- Notable relatives: Michael Hobbs (son); Robbie Deans (brother-in-law); Bruce Deans (brother-in-law)
- Occupation: Sports executive

Rugby union career
- Position: Flanker
Provincial / State sides
Years	Team	Apps	(Points)
1980–1986	Canterbury	74	(60)
International career
Years	Team	Apps	(Points)
1983–1986	New Zealand	21	(16)

Michael James Bowie Hobbs CNZM (15 February 1960 – 13 March 2012), known as Jock Hobbs, was a New Zealand rugby union player and administrator. A flanker, he played for Canterbury and won 21 caps for the New Zealand national team, the All Blacks, between 1983 and 1986, with four tests as captain.

In later years he was prominent in rugby administration. Between 2002 and 2010 he was chairman of the New Zealand Rugby Union before standing down due to illness.

== Youth and playing career ==
Hobbs was born in Christchurch. He played in the first XV at Christ's College in Christchurch, and was a regular first choice for Canterbury from the 1981 season onwards, playing in the failed Ranfurly Shield challenge against Waikato. His test debut came in 1983 against the British and Irish Lions, where he was successor to Graham Mourie. Others that were possible replacements were Bruce Middleton and Auckland captain Alwyn Harvey, but Hobbs played so well against the Lions that he was an automatic selection as All Blacks number seven for the next few seasons.

Hobbs was All Black captain on the short tour of Fiji late in 1984 when Andy Dalton was unavailable, and in the tour of Argentina in 1985 when Dalton was again unavailable. He took part in the 1986 New Zealand Cavaliers tour to South Africa, before retiring in 1987 after a succession of concussions.

== Administrator ==
In 1995, Hobbs was instrumental in retaining New Zealand's leading players when they were on the verge of defecting to Kerry Packer's rebel World Rugby Corporation. In the 1996 Queen's Birthday Honours, he was appointed a Member of the New Zealand Order of Merit, for services to rugby.

In 2005, Hobbs led New Zealand's successful bid to host the 2011 Rugby World Cup and in the same year was named the Herald's New Zealander of the year. In the 2006 Queen's Birthday Honours, he was promoted to Companion of the New Zealand Order of Merit, for services to rugby and sports administration.

Hobbs was the longest serving chairman in NZRU history and his service to the game was recognized at the 2011 IRB and Steinlager Rugby awards where he received the Vernon Pugh award for Distinguished service and the Steinlager Salver award respectively.

In 2010, Hobbs stepped down from his administrative positions in order to battle leukaemia. He died of the disease on 13 March 2012 at Wellington Hospital.

Awards
Preceded by John Anderson	Leadership Award; 2010	Succeeded by Murray Halberg
