= Warwick Taylor =

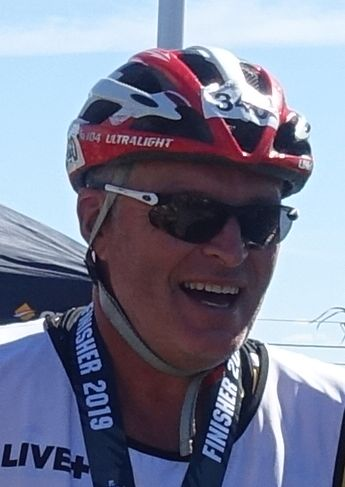
- Taylor in 2019
- Born: Warwick Thomas Taylor; 11 March 1960 (age 66) Hamilton, New Zealand
- Height: 1.79 m (5 ft 10 in)
- Weight: 79 kg (174 lb)
- School: Matamata College
- University: University of Otago
- Notable relative(s): Murray Taylor (brother); Tom Taylor (son)
- Occupation: Schoolteacher

Rugby union career
- Position: Second five-eighth
Provincial / State sides
Years	Team	Apps	(Points)
1980–81	Otago	20	
1982–90	Canterbury		
International career
Years	Team	Apps	(Points)
1983–88	New Zealand	24	(20)

Warwick Thomas Taylor (born 11 March 1960) is a former New Zealand rugby union player. He won 24 caps for the All Blacks between 1983 and 1988 and played in the victorious New Zealand team at the 1987 Rugby World Cup.

Since retiring from rugby, Taylor has taught physical education at Burnside High School in Christchurch. He was assistant coach of the New Zealand women's national rugby union team from 2007–2009.
