= Gary Knight (rugby union) =

- Born: Gary Albert Knight; 26 August 1951 (age 75) Wellington, New Zealand
- Height: 1.87 m (6 ft 2 in)
- Weight: 107 kg (236 lb)
- School: Mana College
- Occupation: Farmer

Rugby union career
- Position: Prop
Provincial / State sides
Years	Team	Apps	(Points)
1972	Horowhenua	7	(0)
1975–1986	Manawatu	145	(60)
International career
Years	Team	Apps	(Points)
1977–1986	New Zealand	36	(4)
Medal record
Men's amateur wrestling
Representing New Zealand
British Commonwealth Games
Bronze medal – third place	1974 Christchurch	Freestyle +100 kg

Gary Albert Knight (born 26 August 1951) is a former New Zealand rugby union player and amateur wrestler.

== Rugby union ==
A prop, Knight represented Horowhenua and Manawatu at a provincial level, and was a member of the New Zealand national side, the All Blacks, from 1977 to 1986. He played 66 matches for the All Blacks, including 36 internationals.

While playing for the All Blacks during the third test of the 1981 Springbok Tour, Knight was famously felled by a flour bomb dropped by Marx Jones.

== Wrestling ==
Knight competed for New Zealand in the super heavyweight (+100 kg) division of freestyle wrestling at the 1974 British Commonwealth Games in Christchurch, winning the bronze medal.
