= John Ashworth (rugby union) =

- Born: John Colin Ashworth; 9 November 1949 (age 77) Waikari, New Zealand
- Height: 1.88 m (6 ft 2 in)
- Weight: 107 kg (236 lb)
- School: Riccarton High School
- Notable relative(s): Craig Green (cousin), Brodie Retallick (nephew)

Rugby union career
- Position: Prop
Provincial / State sides
Years	Team	Apps	(Points)
1972–1984	Canterbury		
1985	Hawke's Bay	2	
International career
Years	Team	Apps	(Points)
1977–1985	New Zealand	24	(4)

John Colin Ashworth (born 9 November 1949) is a New Zealand former rugby union player. A prop, Ashworth represented Canterbury and, briefly, Hawke's Bay at a provincial level, and was a member of the New Zealand national side, the All Blacks, from 1977 to 1985. He played 52 matches for the All Blacks including 24 internationals. He is remembered for stamping on the face of JPR Williams during a match against Bridgend. The wound required 30 stitches.
