= Counties Manukau Rugby Football Union =

New Zealand governing body of rugby union

- Sport: Rugby union
- Jurisdiction: Franklin District
- Abbreviation: CMRFU
- Founded: 1955; 71 years ago
- Affiliation: New Zealand Rugby
- Headquarters: Pukekohe
- CEO: Chad Shepherd

Official website
- www.steelers.co.nz
- (New Zealand)

The Counties Manukau Rugby Football Union (CMRFU) is the governing body of rugby union in Southern Auckland and the Franklin district of New Zealand. Nicknamed the Steelers, their colours are red, white, and black horizontal bands. The Steelers moniker is a reference to the Glenbrook steel factory, which is in the area. The union is based in Pukekohe, and plays at Navigation Homes Stadium.

== History ==
The union was preceded by the South Auckland sub-union of the Auckland Rugby Football Union, the sub-union being founded in 1926. This became a full union, with the name "South Auckland Counties", in 1955. The name was shortened to "Counties" just a year later. The name Counties Manukau was adopted in 1995.

Counties Manukau Steelers former logo

The history of Counties has been very much about adventurous football and taking risks, and this was certainly the case initially as the team strove to establish an identity and tradition. Counties' first game was against Auckland in Waiuku in 1955, which they lost 95–3, led by Barry Baxter. In that inaugural year the team defeated a Wellington XV twice, the first 19–6 on Bledisloe Park, Pukekohe, where the union's first All Black, Pat Walsh scored twice. Barry Bracewell, coach from 1961–63 and 1967–75, adopted a style in conflict with the ethos of the day of forward dominance and percentage safety from the backs. Bracewell, and Tauroa after him, selected mobile forwards and loose forwards with exciting backs with attacking game plans.

The Counties team of this era had many highlights. The first was winning the NPC championship in 1979, with wins over Waikato, Wellington, North Auckland, Thames Valley, Bay of Plenty, Poverty Bay, South Canterbury, Manawatu, Taranaki, Otago, Canterbury, and Southland, also beating Victoria and Argentina that year. Winning the Inter-Dominion Championship (forerunner to the Super 10) against Queensland in Brisbane was another achievement, while the 1982 team beat Australia 15–9, which included greats such as David Campese.

In 1982, playing Canterbury not only for the Ranfurly Shield but also the NPC championship, with Counties ahead 15–12 with only minutes remaining, Robert Kururangi intercepted a Canterbury pass and was about to score when the referee dubiously judged him offside, awarding Canterbury the penalty which Robbie Deans successfully kicked to win the championship and retain the shield. The previous season the shield challenge against Waikato also ended in a draw (21–21) after Counties conceded two late and controversial penalties. The third Ranfurly Shield agony came three years later in 1985 against Auckland, when Counties, down 12–3, were denied what appeared to be a perfectly legitimate try to Dave Trombik after the referee received some subtle persuasion by Auckland skipper Andy Haden. Later in the game Warren McClean scored a try for Counties, making the final score 12–9, with Counties on the losing side.

Counties finally improved during the mid-1990s. A forward packing containing Errol Brain, Jim Coe, Glen Marsh, and Junior Paramore, with backs including Tony Marsh, George Leaupepe, Blair Feeney, Jonah Lomu, Joeli Vidiri and Dean Sheppard, proved one of the best Counties side ever, making the NPC finals twice, in 1996 and 1997, losing to Auckland and Canterbury respectively. A highlight of that period came in 1997 during the semi-final in Hamilton. Behind at one stage 9–33, and stung by a ground announcement advertising tickets for a home Waikato final next week, Counties fought back with a 43–40 win. After a steady decline since then, Counties lost a promotion-relegation match in 2001, and dropped to the second division, where Counties could not retain their best players and lost the likes of Stephen Donald, Sitiveni Sivivatu, Casey Laulala, and Kieran Read to other unions.

In 2006 Counties was selected to rejoin the top sides in the new Air New Zealand Cup Premier Division, and they still retain their exciting attacking style of rugby. Success has been limited, a win over Auckland in 2008 being a highlight. Former All Black captain Tana Umaga joined Counties as player/coach in 2010 and was appointed head coach in December 2011. In 2013, after 24 previous unsuccessful Ranfurly Shield challenges – including two draws – the Umaga-coached Counties-Manukau team gave Steelers fans something to celebrate when captain Fritz Lee lifted the Ranfurly Shield for the first time in the province's history following a dramatic 27–24 win over Hawkes Bay.

== Club rugby ==
The clubs in the Counties Manukau union are:

- Ardmore Marist
- Beachlands Maraetai
- Bombay
- Drury
- Karaka
- Manukau Inst. Tech.
- Manurewa
- Maramarua
- Mercer
- Onewhero
- Papakura
- Patumahoe
- Pukekohe
- Puni
- Te Kauwhata
- Te Kohanga
- Tuakau
- Waiuku District Rugby Football Club
- Wairoa Rangers Rugby Club Clevedon
- Weymouth, Manukau

The Counties Manukau union does not include all clubs in the area of the former Manukau City. Clubs such as Manukau Rovers RFC and the Papatoetoe RFC are members of the Auckland Rugby Union.

The teams in the Counties Manukau Premier grade club rugby competition play for the T.P. McNamara Memorial Cup. Club finals are usually held in the month of July at Pukekohe Stadium.

=== T.P. McNamara Memorial Cup Winners Roll of Honour ===
- 1955 – City Ramblers (1)
- 1956 – Papakura (1)
- 1957 – Papakura (2)
- 1958 – Papakura (3) /Waiuku (1)
- 1959 – Onewhero Utd (1)
- 1960 – Ardmore(1)/Pukekohe (1)
- 1961 – Manurewa (1)
- 1962 – Manurewa (2)
- 1963 – Manurewa (3)
- 1964 – Pukekohe (2)
- 1965 – Manurewa (4)
- 1966 – Manurewa (5)
- 1967 – Manurewa (6)
- 1968 – Papakura (4)
- 1969 – Manurewa (7)
- 1970 – Manurewa (8)
- 1971 – Manurewa (9)
- 1972 – Papakura (5)
- 1973 – Papakura (6)
- 1974 – Papakura (7)/Manurewa (10)
- 1975 – Manurewa (11)
- 1976 – Manurewa (12)
- 1977 – Manurewa (13)
- 1978 – Manurewa (14)
- 1979 – Ardmore (2)
- 1980 – Manurewa (15)
- 1981 – Ardmore (3)
- 1982 – Papakura (8)
- 1983 – Ardmore (4)
- 1984 – Manurewa (16)
- 1985 – Bombay (1)
- 1986 – Manurewa (17)
- 1987 – Bombay (2)
- 1988 – Manurewa(18)
- 1989 – Bombay (3)
- 1990 – Manurewa (19)
- 1991 – Manurewa (20)
- 1992 – Manurewa (21)
- 1993 – Manurewa (22)
- 1994 – Manurewa (23)
- 1995 – Manurewa (24)
- 1996 – Papakura (9)
- 1997 – Manurewa (25)
- 1998 – Manurewa (26)
- 1999 – Pukekohe (3)
- 2000 – Waiuku (2)
- 2001 – Ardmore Marist (1)
- 2002 – Ardmore Marist (2)
- 2003 – Waiuku (3)
- 2004 – Pukekohe (4)
- 2005 – Pukekohe (5)
- 2006 – Patumahoe (1)
- 2007 – Pukekohe (6)
- 2008 – Ardmore Marist (3)
- 2009 – Patumahoe (2)
- 2010 – Waiuku (4)
- 2011 – Pukekohe (7)
- 2012 – Patumahoe (3)
- 2013 – Ardmore Marist(4)
- 2014 – Bombay (4)
- 2015 – Bombay (5)
- 2016 – Bombay (6)
- 2017 – Bombay (7)
- 2018 – Ardmore Marist (5)
- 2019 – Bombay (8)
- 2020 – Season abandoned
- 2021 – Karaka (1)
- 2022 – Manurewa (27)
- 2023 – Manurewa (28)
- 2024 – Patumahoe (4)
- 2025 – Karaka (2)
- 2026 – Pukekohe (8)

=== Recent grand finals ===
- 2026 - Pukekohe 24-22 Ardmore-Marist
- 2025 - Karaka 21-13 Pukekohe
- 2024 - Patumahoe 17-8 Karaka
- 2023 - Manurewa 25-24 Karaka
- 2022 - Manurewa 22-16 Patumahoe

=== Club championship titles by club ===
T.P. McNamara Memorial Cup Winners
Club	Number of titles
Manurewa	28
Papakura	8
Bombay	8
Pukekohe	8
Ardmore Marist	5
Ardmore	4
Patumahoe	4
Waiuku	4
Karaka	2
Onewhero	1
City Ramblers	1

A previous logo of the union

== Provincial rugby ==
=== Wonder years ===
Counties Manukau rugby enjoyed its heyday in the 1980s. From 1995 till 1999, captain Errol Brain led another successful era. The "player drain" of stars such as Lomu (Wellington), Vidiri (Auckland), Lee (Otago), and Marsh (France), signalled a downturn in the fortunes of Counties.

From 2013 to 2019 Counties Manukau played in the top division of New Zealand's national championship. Counties Manukau were more than competitive winning the Ranfurly Shield for the first time in 2013 (defending it 6 times), and making the semi-finals on two occasions. Again the bulk of the team and coaching staff moved on, and so ended the good fortunes of the team.

=== Centurions ===
Players who have played 100 or more games for the union

- Alan Dawson
- Andy Dalton
- Bob Lendrum
- Ean McRobbie
- Graham Taylor
- Henk Harbraken
- Henry Maxwell
- Jim Coe
- John Spiers
- John Hughes
- Lee Lidgard
- Lindsay Raki
- Mark Moore
- Paul Tuoro
- Peter Clotworthy
- Rod Ketels
- Roy Craig
- Warren McLean
- Errol Brain
- Bruce Robertson
- Grant Henson

== Super Rugby ==
When Super Rugby began, Counties Manukau was associated with the Blues, but since 1999 it has been aligned to the Chiefs.

== All Blacks ==
Counties players in the All Blacks

- Pat Walsh (1955–63)
- Kevin Skinner (1956)
- Mick Cossey (1958)
- Bruce McLeod (1964–70)
- Michael Knight (1968)
- Bob Lendrum (1973)
- Bruce Robertson (1972–81)
- John Spiers (1976, 79–81)
- Rod Ketels (1979–81)
- Andy Dalton (1977–85)
- Robert Kururangi (1978)
- Nicky Allen (1980)
- Brett Codlin (1980)
- Brett Wilson (1983)
- Mark Cooksley (1992–93)
- Jonah Lomu (1994–99)
- Joeli Vidiri (1998)
- Sitiveni Sivivatu (2004, made All Blacks from Waikato)
- Casey Laulala (2005, made All Blacks from Canterbury)
- Stephen Donald (2008, made All Blacks from Waikato)
- Kieran Read (2009, made All Blacks from Canterbury)
- Lelia Masaga (2009)
- Sonny Bill Williams (2010, made All Blacks from Canterbury)
- Frank Halai (2013)
- Augustine Pulu (2014)
- Nepo Laulala (2015, made All Blacks from Canterbury)
- Dalton Papalii (2018, made All Blacks from Auckland)
- Hoskins Sotutu (2020, made All Blacks from Auckland)

== Women's Rugby ==
Counties Manukau has a women's team that is part of Women's Provincial Championship. Counties were crowned champions for the first time in 2016 taking down the eight time defending champs Auckland 41-22. Counties made it to the final of the 2017 competition after finishing top of the table for the second year running. They were defeated 13–7 in the final by Canterbury.
