= 1913 in New Zealand =

- Decades: 1890s; 1900s; 1910s; 1920s; 1930s
- See also: History of New Zealand; List of years in New Zealand; Timeline of New Zealand history

The following lists events that happened during 1913 in New Zealand.

== Incumbents ==
=== Regal and viceregal ===
- Head of State — George V
- Governor — Arthur Foljambe, 2nd Earl of Liverpool
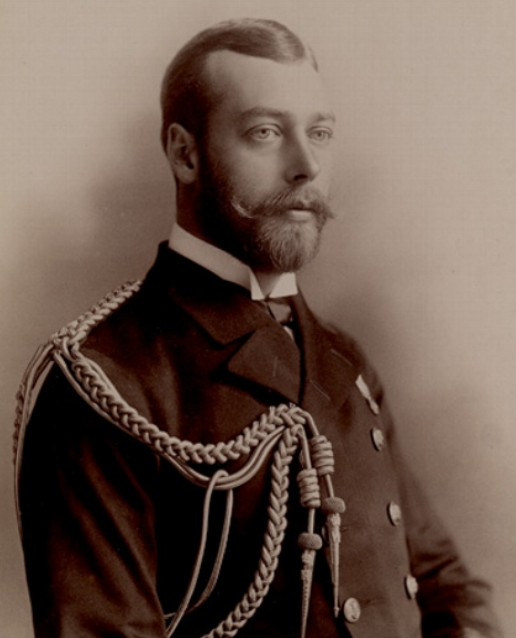
George V

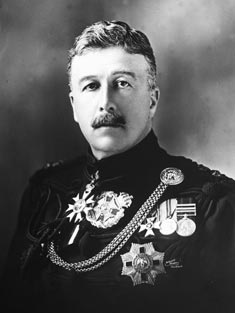
Lord Liverpool

=== Government ===
The 18th New Zealand Parliament continues, with the Reform Party in government.

- Speaker of the House — Arthur Guinness (Liberal) until 10 June, then Frederic Lang (Reform Party) from 26 June
- Prime Minister — William Massey
- Minister of Finance — James Allen
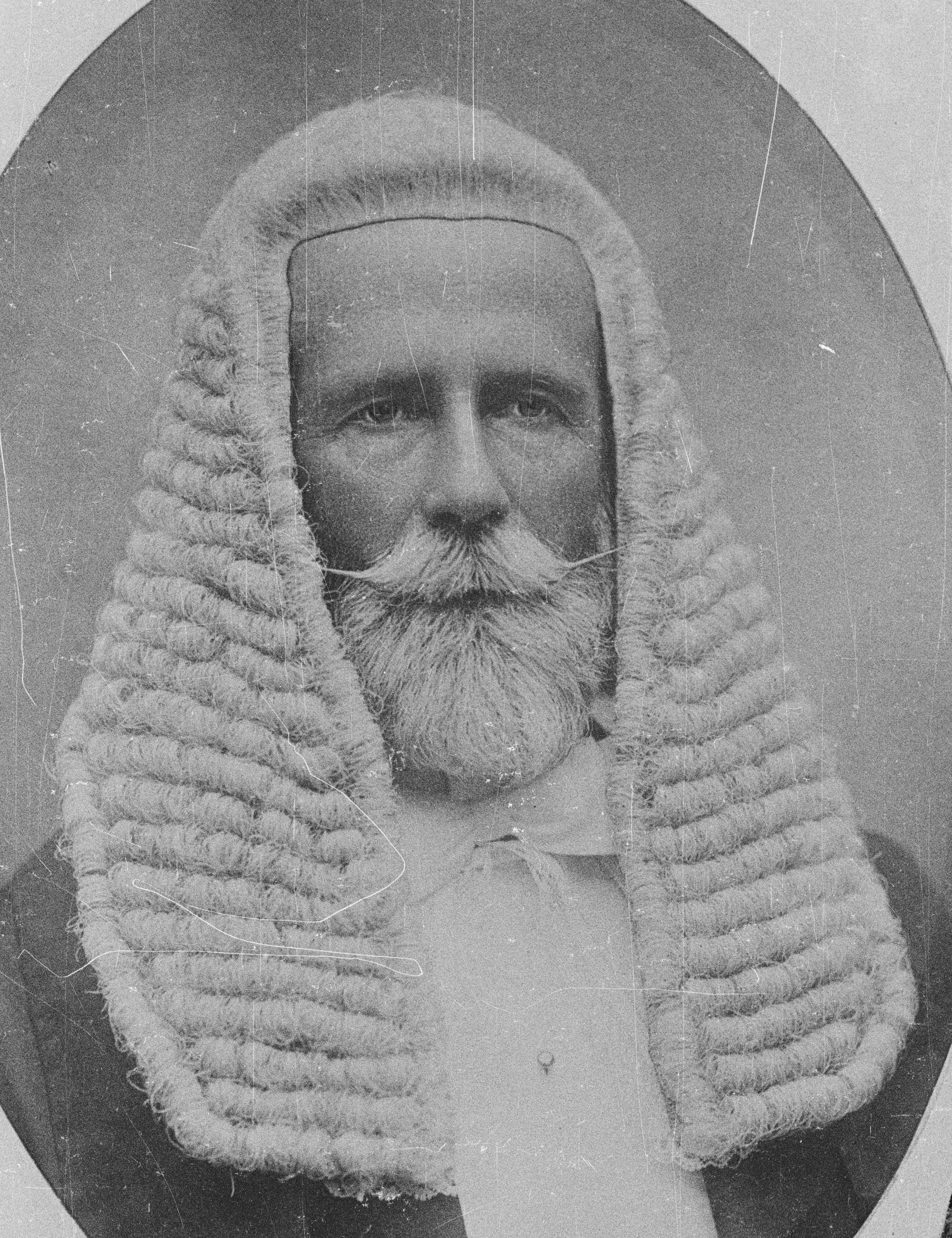
Arthur Guinness

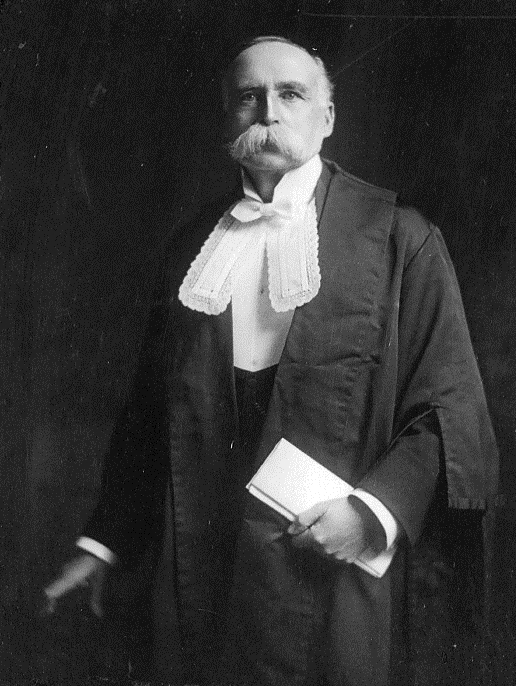
Frederic Lang

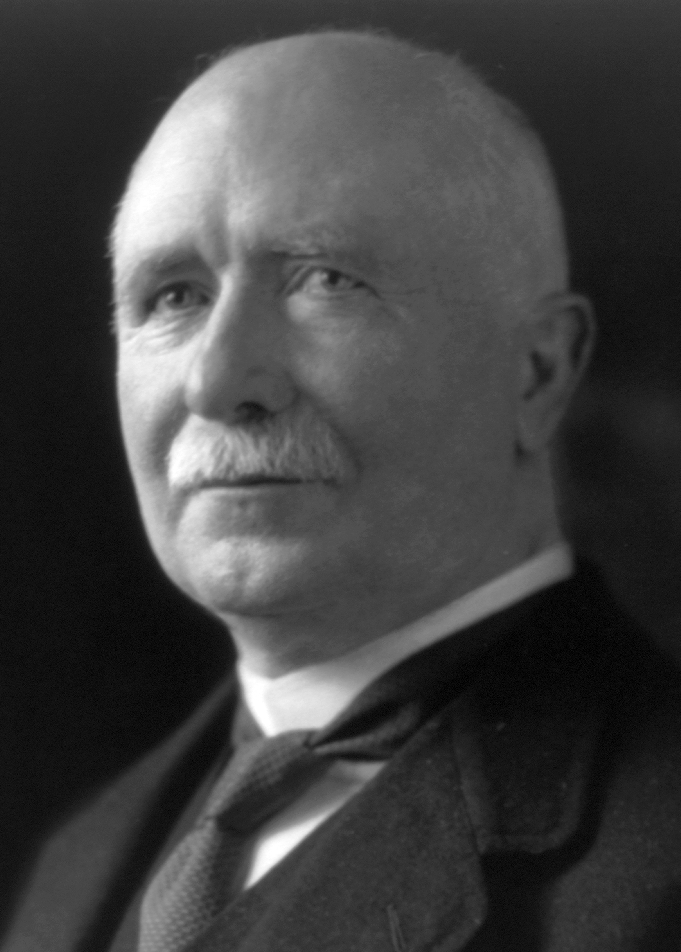
William Massey

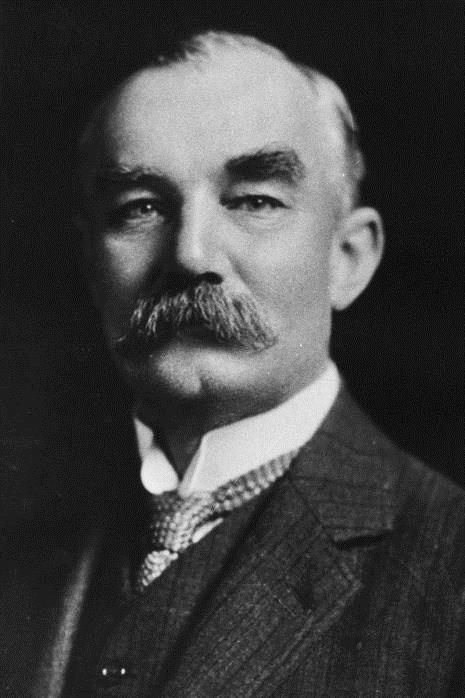
James Allen

=== Parliamentary opposition ===
- Leader of the Opposition — Joseph Ward (Liberal Party) from 13 September.
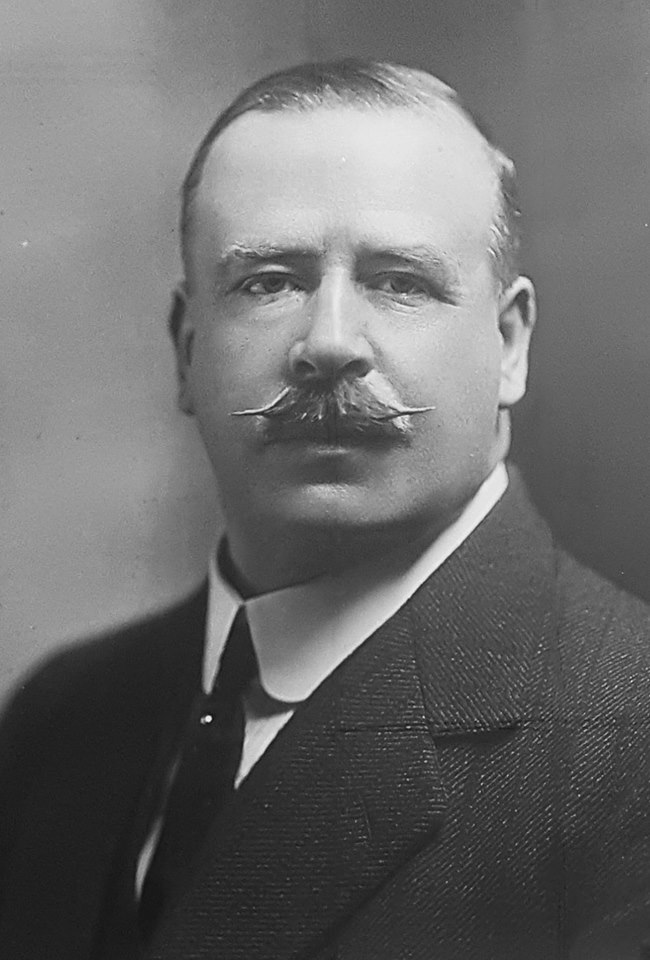
Joseph Ward

=== Judiciary ===
- Chief Justice – Robert Stout
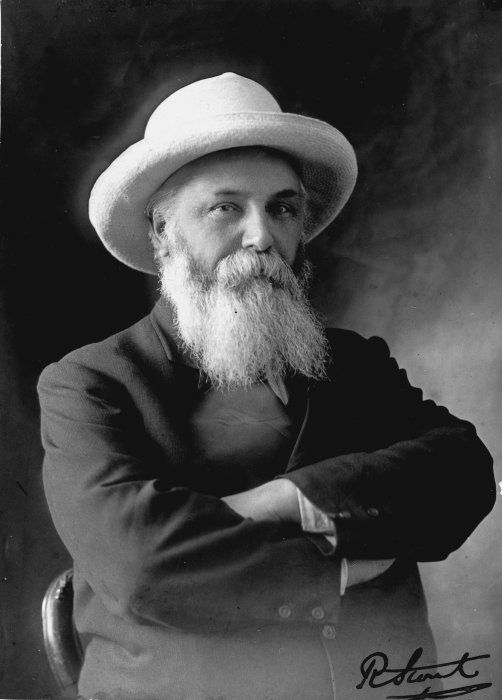
Robert Stout

=== Main centre leaders ===
- Mayor of Auckland — James Parr
- Mayor of Wellington — John Luke
- Mayor of Christchurch — Henry Holland
- Mayor of Dunedin — John Wilson, then William Downie Stewart Jr
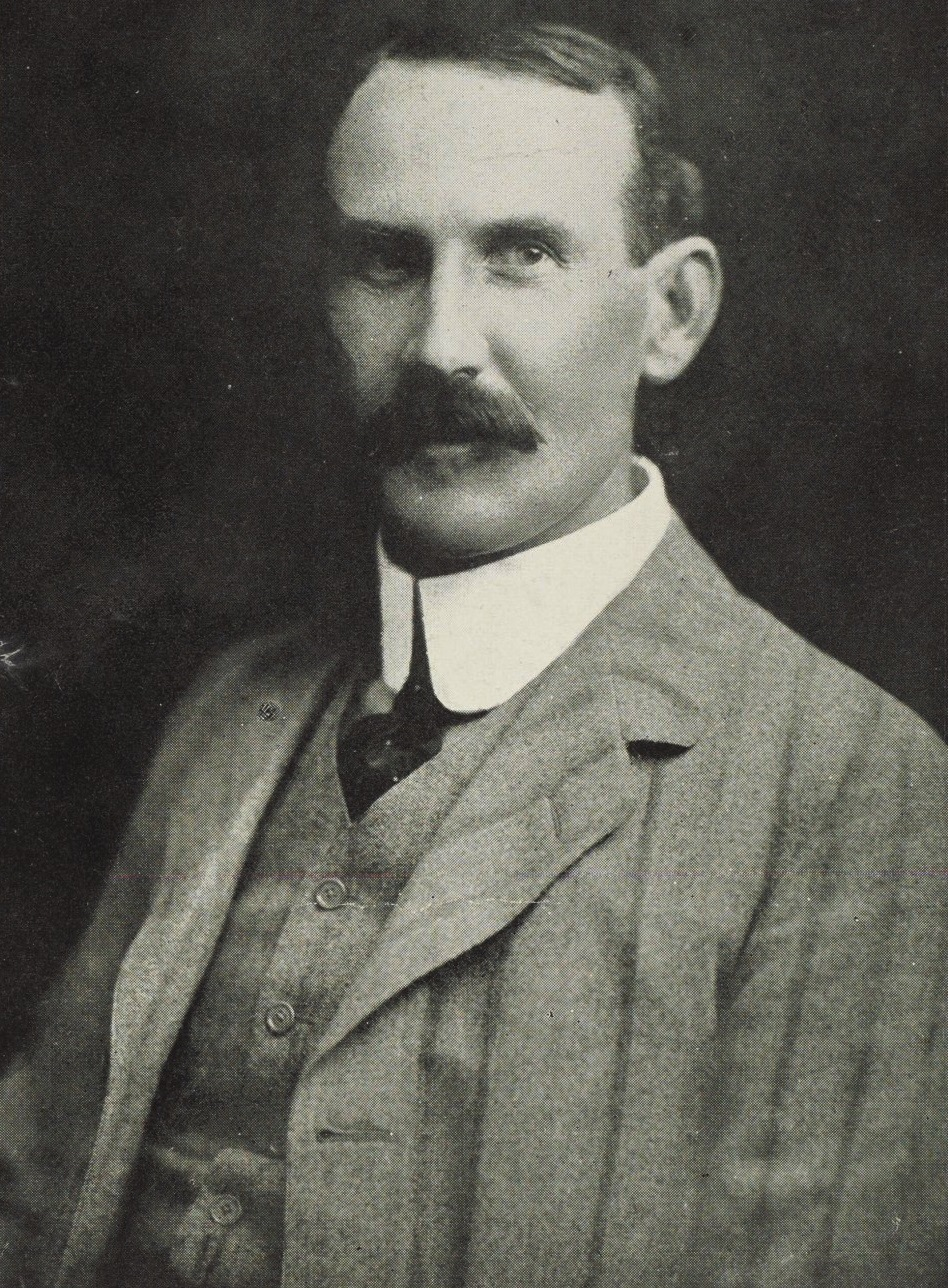
James Parr

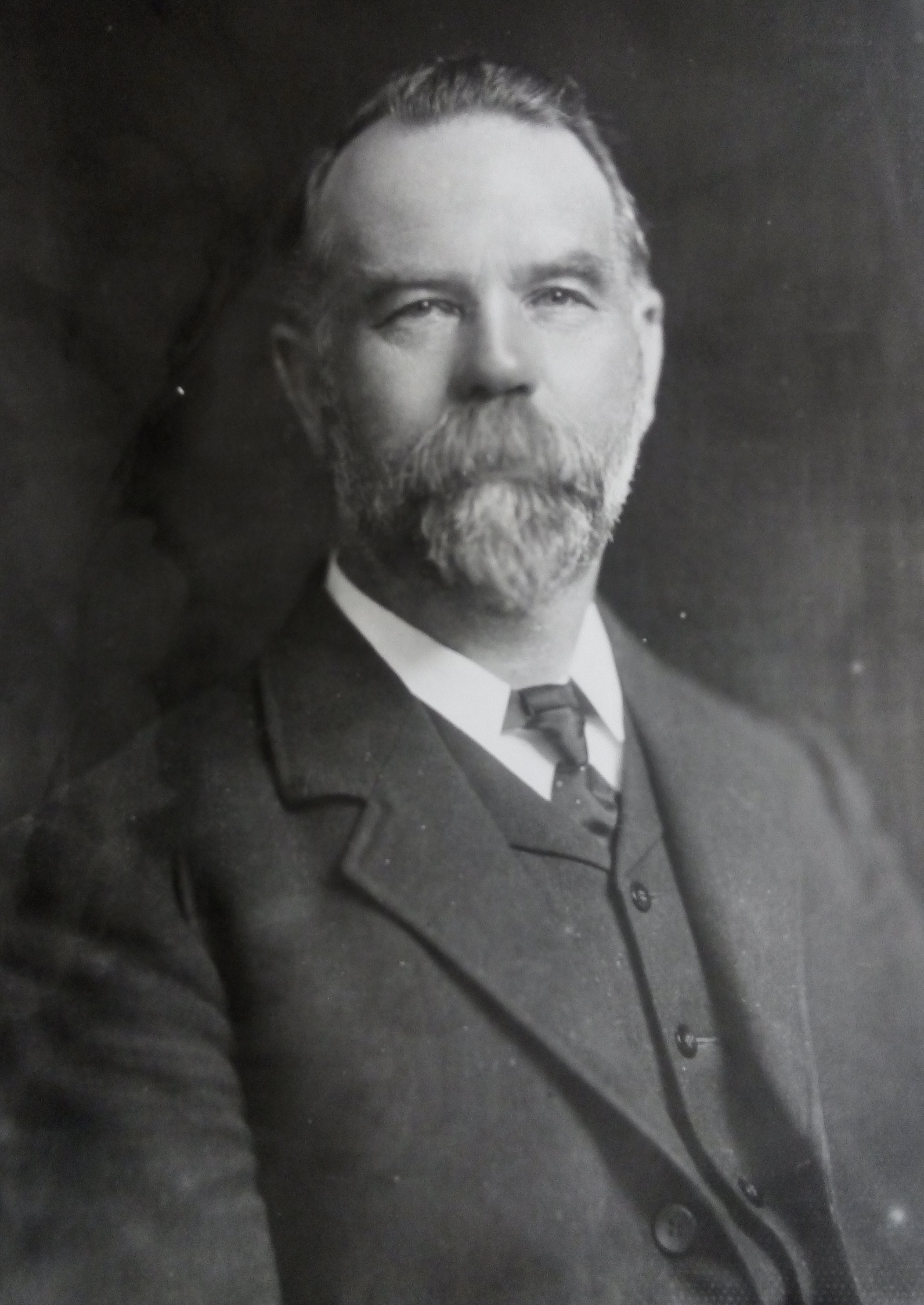
John Luke

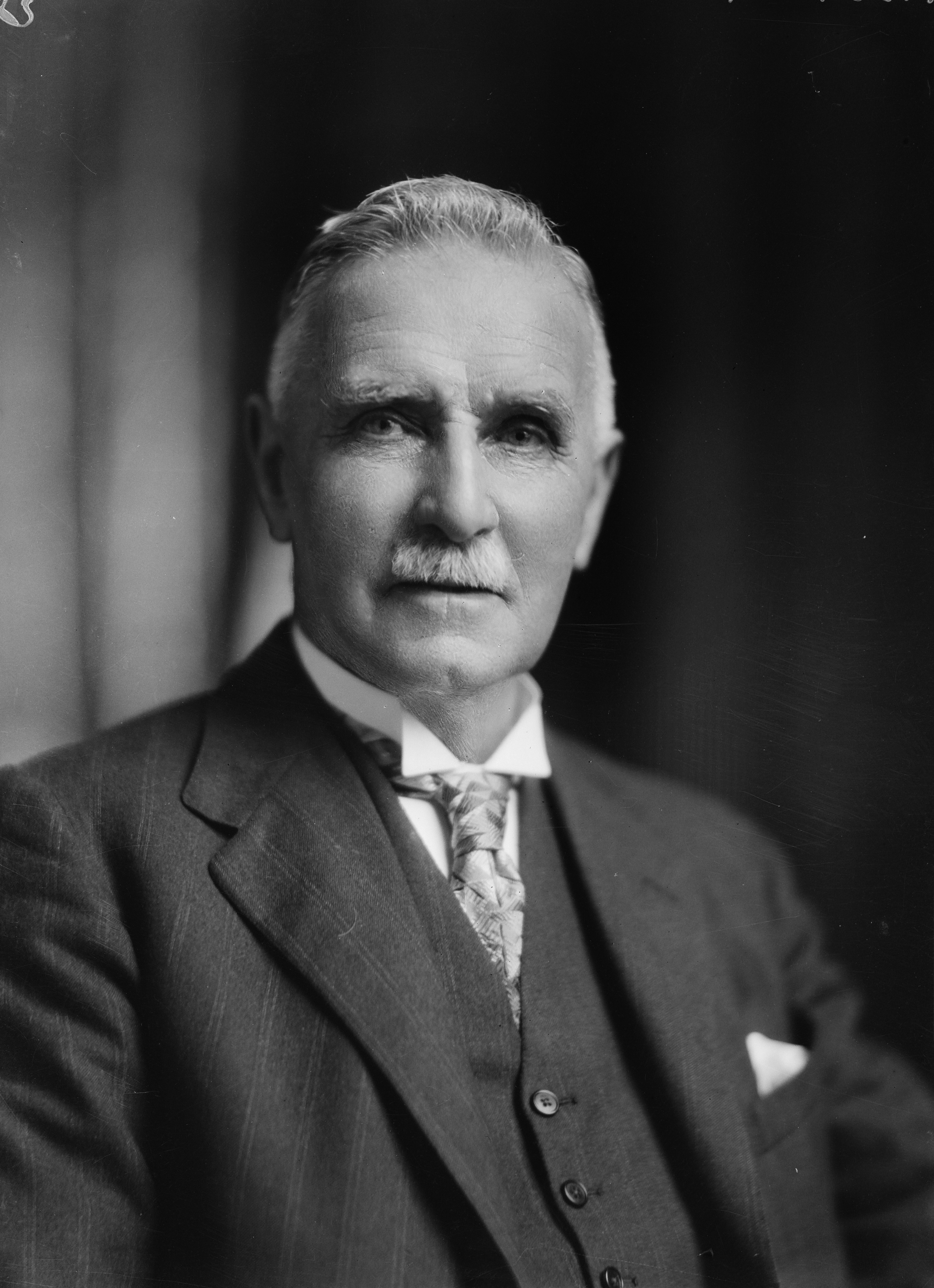
Henry Holland

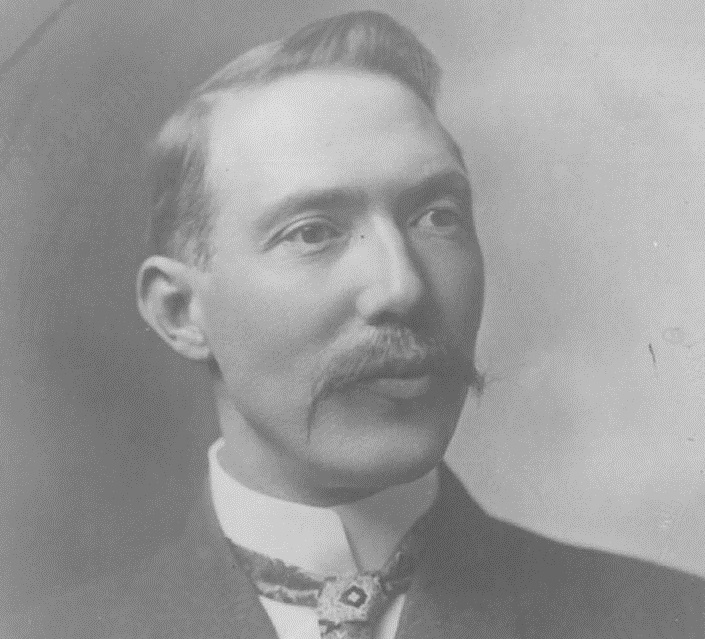
John Wilson

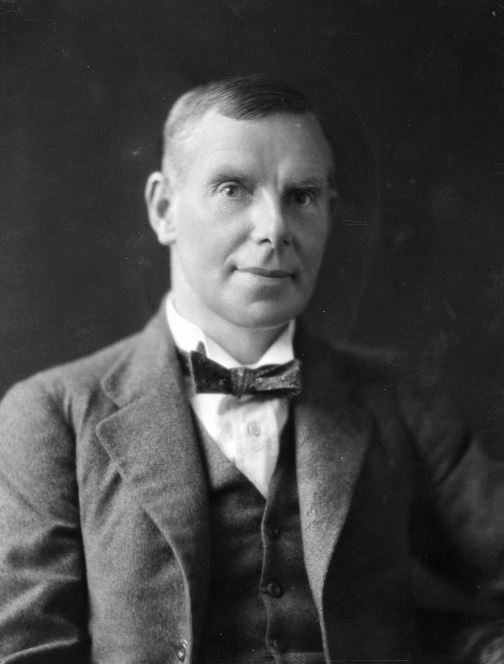
William Downie Stewart

== Events ==
- 22 March: The world's first automatic totalisator is used at the Easter meeting at Ellerslie Racecourse in Auckland.
- 13 April: Frederik E. Sandford flies the rebuilt biplane Manurewa at the Avondale Racecourse. The Manurewa was formerly owned and flown by the Walsh Brothers before it crashed (see 1911) but is now owned by a syndicate and been rebuilt by Sandford and William Miller.
- 19 April: American Arthur "Wizard" Stone flies a Blériot XI monoplane for 400 metres (0.25 mi) from the cricket ground at Auckland Domain.
- 24 April: "Wizard" Stone flies for an estimated 19 kilometres (12 mi) from Alexandra Park.
- April or May: Frederik Sandford flies the first woman passenger in New Zealand, a Miss Lester.
- 9 July: The first suspected case in a Smallpox outbreak is reported. It is later confirmed and the outbreak becomes an epidemic.
- 31 August: Sandford flies west from Avondale covering 3 miles (4.8 km) at 45 miles per hour (72 km/h), but crashes at New Lynn on the return to Avondale.
- 22 October: Wellington watersiders go on strike.
- 23 October: Wellington watersiders are locked out sparking nationwide waterfront strikes.
- 29 October: Over 1000 Wellington strikers hold a protest meeting at the Basin Reserve.
- 30 October: The first "special constables" arrive in Wellington.
- 8 November: "Special constables" occupy Auckland wharves leading to a general strike.
- 10 November: A general strike is called in Wellington but it is not supported.
- 23 November: The general strike in Auckland ends.
- 1 December: Auckland Exhibition opens.
- 20 December: Wellington waterfront strike is called off.

=== Undated ===
- Arthur Schaef makes short powered hops in his second, unnamed, aircraft, at Lyall Bay, Wellington.
- Hector and Seaforth McKenzie fly their Hamilton biplane at Marton.
- Percy Fisher and Reginald White fly an aircraft of their own design at Greytown. The event is also filmed.

== Arts and literature ==
See 1913 in art, 1913 in literature, Category:1913 books

=== Music ===
See: 1913 in music

=== Film ===
- Hinemoa — first New Zealand feature film, made by Gaston Méliès
- How Chief Te Ponga Won His Bride – also by Gaston Méliès and the Star Film Company
- Loved by a Maori Chieftess- also by Gaston Méliès and the Star Film Company
- The River Wanganui – one of five short films made in New Zealand by Gaston Méliès and the Star Film Company

See: 1913 in film, List of New Zealand feature films, Cinema of New Zealand, Category:1913 films, Category:1913 film awards

== Sport ==
=== Chess ===
- The 26th National Chess Championship was held in Nelson, and was won by J.C. Grierson of Auckland, his second title.

=== Golf ===
==== Men's ====
- The seventh New Zealand Open championship was won by Ted Douglas.
- The 21st National Amateur Championships were held in Otago
  - Matchplay: B.B. Wood (Christchurch) — 2nd title

==== Women's ====
- Matchplay: Mrs. G Williams.
- Strokeplay: Mrs G. Williams – 3rd title

=== Horse racing ===
==== Harness racing ====
- New Zealand Trotting Cup: Ravenschild
- Auckland Trotting Cup: Jewel Chimes

=== Rugby league ===
- New Zealand national rugby league team

=== Rugby union ===
- Auckland defend the Ranfurly Shield against Wellington (6–5) and Poverty Bay (27–3) before losing it to Taranaki (11–14)

=== Soccer ===
Provincial league champions:

- Auckland: Everton Auckland
- Canterbury: Sydenham
- Hawke's Bay: Waipukurau
- Otago: Kaitangata FC
- Southland: Rangers
- Wanganui: Eastbrooke
- Wellington: Wellington Thistle

=== Tennis ===
- Anthony Wilding is ranked the world's No.1 player and records a unique triple, winning world championships in hard court, lawn and indoor.

== Births ==
=== January ===
- 6 January – Bill Broughton, jockey
- 8 January – Dennis Smith, cricketer
- 12 January – Jack Taylor, rugby union player, coach and administrator
- 13 January – Norman Henderson, cricketer
- 17 January – Arthur Cutler, cricketer
- 18 January – Douglas Dalton, rugby union player
- 19 January – Henry Waine, cricketer
- 31 January – Jim Blandford, cricketer

=== February ===
- 2 February – Harry Wigley, pilot, tourism industry leader
- 13 February – Minden Blake, World War II flying ace, inventor
- 15 February
  - Jean Horsley, artist
  - Helmut Rex, Presbyterian theologian
- 18 February – Nola Millar, theatre director
- 20 February – Helen Shaw, short-story writer, poet, editor
- 24 February – Rowan Nicks, surgeon

=== March ===
- 5 March – Athol Rafter, nuclear chemist
- 11 March – Eric Gowing, Anglican bishop
- 23 March – Nancy Northcroft, town planner

=== April ===
- 2 April
  - Angus McDougall, cricketer
  - Beth Zanders, artist
- 8 April – Ron Stone, association footballer
- 9 April – Vincent McCarten, cricketer
- 13 April – Ronald Tinker, soldier, scientific administrator
- 22 April
  - Ted Dunning, cricketer
  - Kenneth J. McNaught, philatelist
- 30 April – John Kavanagh, Roman Catholic bishop

=== May ===
- 4 May – Bill Laney, politician
- 5 May – John Denvir, soldier
- 6 May – Douglas Stewart, poet
- 9 May – Alfred Cobden, cricketer
- 13 May – John Miles, microbiologist, epidemiologist
- 16 May – Norman Davis, English language and literature academic
- 18 May – Hono Denham, cricketer
- 19 May – Artie Combes, cricketer
- 23 May – Charlie Saxton, cricket, rugby union player, coach and administrator
- 25 May – Gordon Jolly, lawn bowls player
- 27 May – Allan Highet, politician
- 31 May – Dave Solomon, rugby union and rugby league player

=== June ===
- 4 June – Tom Pearce, rugby union player and administrator, businessman, politician
- 5 June – Alan Brash, Presbyterian minister
- 12 June – Ruth France, poet, novelist
- 19 June – Peter Donkin, World War II pilot
- 28 June – Bill Gwynne, cricket umpire
- 30 June – Percy Allen, politician

=== July ===
- 12 July – Rufus Rogers, doctor, politician
- 13 July – Len Newell, swimmer
- 14 July – Claude Clegg, javelin thrower
- 15 July – Terry McLean, sports journalist
- 18 July – Stephen Peter Llewellyn, soldier, historian, writer
- 21 July – Betty Molesworth Allen, botanist
- 26 July – Howard Benge, rower
- 27 July – Charles Bennett, broadcaster, soldier, diplomat
- 28 July – Tom Morrison, rugby union player and administrator
- 31 July – George Wallace, cricketer

=== August ===
- 6 August – Oscar Wrigley, cricketer
- 8 August – Mick Randall, cricketer
- 11 August – Reginald Cook, cricketer
- 20 August
  - Desmond Dunnet, cricketer
  - Vi Farrell, cricketer
- 21 August – Ken Uttley, cricketer, pathologist
- 23 August – Nikola Nobilo, winemaker
- 24 August – Johannes La Grouw – architect, engineer, businessman
- 29 August – Len Butterfield, cricketer

=== September ===
- 1 September
  - Dan Davin, author
  - Jean Mitchell, netball player
- 2 September – Mick Borrie, demographer
- 3 September – Malcolm Lohrey, cricketer
- 5 September – Nancy Browne, cricketer
- 6 September – Ron Ulmer, cyclist
- 12 September – Alastair Monteath, cricketer
- 13 September – Oswald Cheesman, musician
- 15 September – Russell Aitken, air force officer
- 21 September – Robertson Stewart, industrialist
- 25 September – Clare Mallory, children's author
- 28 September
  - Maurice Browne, cricketer
  - Haane Manahi, soldier

=== October ===
- 1 October – Ken Cumberland, geographer, politician
- 3 October – Ruth Symons, cricketer
- 8 October – J. Graham Miller, Presbyterian missionary
- 17 October – Norman Ellis, cricketer
- 19 October – John Anderson, rugby league player
- 25 October
  - John Charters, rower
  - Mabel Corby, cricketer
- 31 October – Roy Calvert, World War II pilot

=== November ===
- 5 November – Pat Devanny, political activist
- 7 November – Ruth Mason, botanist
- 13 November – Bill Young, politician
- 16 November – Wilfred Brimble, rugby league player
- 22 November – Neville Mitchell, rugby union player and coach
- 24 November – Geoff Baylis, botanist

=== December ===
- 3 December – John Mitchell, physicist
- 4 December – Yvonne Lawley, actor
- 11 December – Robert Grotte, rugby league player
- 13 December – Rudolf Gopas, artist, art teacher
- 19 December – Bill Pullar, athlete
- 21 December – George Giles, cyclist

== Deaths ==
=== January–March ===
- 17 January – John Bryce, politician (born 1833)
- 18 January – Elizabeth Horrell, schoolteacher (born 1826)
- 22 January – Alexander Brown, marine engineer (born 1830)
- 29 January – William Webb, cricketer (born 1872)
- 4 February – Kate Wyllie, Rongowhakaata leader (born c. 1840)
- 21 February – John Hoyte, artist (born 1835)
- 6 March – Margaret Ralph, businesswoman (born c. 1822)
- 10 March – George Clarke, pioneer, educationalist (born 1823)
- 19 March – Eleanor Smith, suffragist, magazine editor (born 1828)

=== April–June ===
- 6 April – Herbert Slade, boxer (born 1851)
- 16 April – Thomas Gapes, politician (born 1848)
- 17 April – Edward Broad, cricketer (born 1875)
- 19 April – John Tiffin Stewart, civil engineer, surveyor (born 1827)
- 20 May – Harry Moffatt, harbourmaster, writer (born 1839)
- 23 May – Edward Lewis, Church of Christ evangelist (born 1831)
- 25 May – Fanny Cole, temperance leader, women's rights advocate (born 1860)
- 3 June – Philip Philips, politician (born 1831)
- 10 June – Sir Arthur Guinness, politician (born 1846)
- 14 June – George Dickinson, cricket player and umpire (born 1828)
- 19 June – Henry Sawtell, politician (born 1832)
- 29 June – John Bush, cricketer (born 1867)

=== July–September ===
- 25 July – George Swan, politician, photographer (born 1833)
- 29 July – Samuel Jackson, solicitor (born 1831)
- 3 August – James Pope, teacher, school inspector, writer (born 1837)
- 30 August – Dudley Ward, politician, judge (born 1827)
- 21 September –Trevor Grierson, cricketer (born 1849)
- 24 September
  - Andrew Loughrey, politician (born 1844)
  - Sir William Russell, politician (born 1838)
- 30 September – Ānaha Te Rāhui, Ngāti Tarāwhai leader, carver (born 1822)

=== October–December ===
- 12 October – Augustus Hamilton, ethologist, biologist, museum director (born 1853)
- 27 October – Henry Wynn-Williams, politician, lawyer (born 1828)
- 10 November – Henry Morrison, cricketer (born 1850)
- 11 November – Petrus Van der Velden, painter (born 1837)
- 19 November – George Laurenson, politician (born 1857)
- 29 November – Samuel Lister, newspaper proprietor and editor (born c. 1833)
- 11 December – Charles Gore, cricketer (born 1871)
- 29 December – Thomas Adamson, soldier, New Zealand Cross recipient (born 1845)

== See also ==
- List of years in New Zealand
- Timeline of New Zealand history
- History of New Zealand
- Military history of New Zealand
- Timeline of the New Zealand environment
- Timeline of New Zealand's links with Antarctica
