= Henry Morrison =

Henry Morrison may refer to:

- Henry Morrison (cricketer) (1850–1913), New Zealand cricketer for Otago
- Henry C. Morrison (1871–1945), American educator
- Henry Clay Morrison (1857–1942), American evangelist and Asbury College president
