= Samuel Lister =

Samuel Lister may refer to:

- Samuel Lister, 1st Baron Masham (1815–1906), English inventor and industrialist
- Samuel Cunliffe Lister, 2nd Baron Masham (1857–1917), English baron and industrialist
- Samuel Lister (editor) (c. 1833–1913), New Zealand printer, newspaper proprietor and editor
