= McCarten =

McCarten is a surname. Notable people with the surname include:

- Anthony McCarten (born 1961), New Zealand writer and playwright
- James McCarten (born 1990), English footballer
- John McCarten (1911–1974), American writer, film critic and theatre critic
- Matt McCarten (born 1959), New Zealand politician
- Vincent McCarten (1913–1993), New Zealand cricketer

== See also ==
- McCartan
