= 1995 New Year Honours (New Zealand) =

Annual awards for New Zealanders

The 1995 New Year Honours in New Zealand were appointments by Elizabeth II in her right as Queen of New Zealand, on the advice of the New Zealand government, to various orders and honours to reward and highlight good works by New Zealanders, and to celebrate the passing of 1994 and the beginning of 1995. They were announced on 31 December 1994.

The recipients of honours are displayed here as they were styled before their new honour.

== Knight Bachelor ==
- The Honourable Alan Douglas Holland – of Christchurch; lately a judge of the High Court of New Zealand.
- Dr William David Southgate – of Wellington. For services to music.

== Order of the Bath ==
=== Companion (CB) ===
Military division

- Air Vice-Marshal John Stuart Hosie OBE – Chief of Air Staff, Royal New Zealand Air Force.

== Order of Saint Michael and Saint George ==
=== Companion (CMG) ===
- Professor Alan Maxwell Clarke – of Christchurch. For services to medicine.

== Order of the British Empire ==
=== Dame Commander (DBE) ===
Civil division

- Elizabeth Margaret Way Harper – of Ashburton. For services to Save the Children Fund.
- Professor Mary Anne Salmond CBE – of Auckland. For services to historical research.
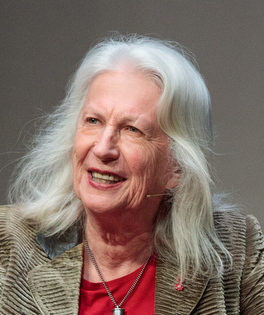
Dame Anne Salmond

=== Knight Commander (KBE) ===
Civil division

- John Anthony Anderson – of Wellington. For services to business management, banking and the community.

=== Commander (CBE) ===
Civil division

- Professor Brian Coote – of Auckland. For services to legal education.
- Margaret Anne Evans JP – of Hamilton. For services to local government.
- Peter Watson Grayburn JP – of Auckland. For services to business management.
- Professor Gavin Stewart McLaren Kellaway – of Auckland. For services to pharmacology.
- The Honourable Richard William Prebble – of Auckland. For public services.
- Alison Mary Roxburgh QSO JP – of Nelson. For services to women's affairs.
- Joan Wiffen – of Hawke's Bay. For services to science.

Military division

- Brigadier Maurice Francis Dodson MC – Brigadiers' List, New Zealand Army.
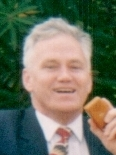
Richard Prebble

=== Officer (OBE) ===
Civil division

- Malcolm James Beattie – of Auckland. For services to surf life saving.
- Douglas Warneton Cain – of Christchurch. For services to swimming.
- Grant Stanley Dalton – of Auckland. For services to yachting.
- Royce Edwin Walter Elliott – of Lower Hutt. For services to agriculture.
- William Allan Reid Galbraith QPM – assistant commissioner, New Zealand Police.
- Dr David Francis Gerrard – of Dunedin. For services to sports medicine and sport.
- Dr John Hall-Jones – of Invercargill. For services to medicine and local history.
- Joyce Yvonne Lawley – of Auckland. For services to the performing arts.
- Denis Heron Lepper – of New Plymouth. For services to the pork industry.
- Barbara Josephine Levido – of Lower Hutt. For services to sport.
- Cyril Thomas Lynch – of Wellington. For services to the electrical industry.
- Emeritus Professor John Bullamore Mackie ED – of Nelson. For services to surveying and the community.
- Nikola Nobilo Sr. – of Auckland. For services to the viticulture industry.
- Patricia Anne Seymour – of Gisborne. For services to the family and the community.
- Dr Thomas James Sprott – of Auckland. For services to forensic science and the community.
- John Matthew Whitelock JP – of Palmerston North. For services to the dairy industry.

Military division

- Group Captain Gordon Lennox Wood AFC – Royal New Zealand Air Force.
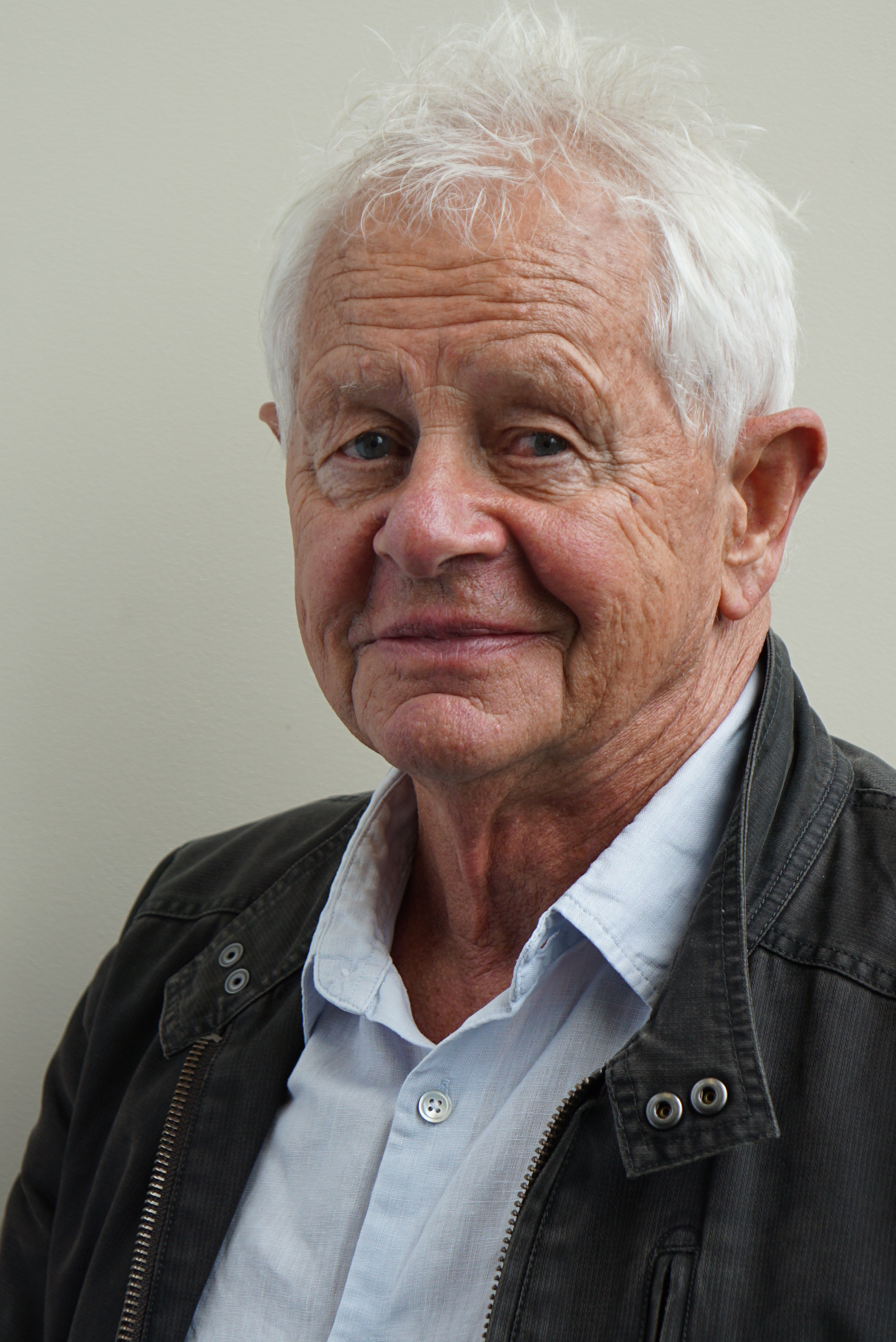
Dave Gerrard

=== Member (MBE) ===
Civil division

- Anne Frances Audain – of Auckland. For services to athletics.
- Kevin Michael Barry Sr. – of Christchurch. For services to boxing.
- Harry Brown – of New Plymouth. For services to music.
- John Maxwell Cryer – of Auckland. For services to entertainment.
- Alan Duff – of Havelock North. For services to literature.
- William Bates Earwaker – of Auckland. For services to local-body and community affairs.
- Jack Macfarlane Alston Forsyth – of Wellington. For services to the produce industry and sport.
- Grant James Fox – of Auckland. For services to rugby.
- Miriam Marie Goodyear-Smith JP – of Auckland. For services to the community.
- Rodney Selwyn Grater – of Oamaru. For services to the community.
- Gladys Euphemia Johnston – of Balclutha. For services to the community.
- Scivier Kevan Lawrence JP – of Waiuku. For services to local-body and community affairs.
- The Honourable Ralph Kerr Maxwell JP – of Auckland. For public services.
- Rosemary Michie – of Rotorua. For services to the community.
- Mita Hikairo Mohi JP – of Ngongotahā. For service to youth.
- Donald Owen Neely – of Wellington. For services to cricket.
- Egan Edward Ogier – of Katikati. For services to the community.
- Matarena Marjorie Rau-Kupa – of New Plymouth. For services to the community.
- Terence John Ryan JP – of Christchurch. For services to the community.
- Robert William Henry Scott JP – of Whangamatā. For services to rugby and the community.
- Dorothy Catherine Smith – of Te Kūiti. For services to the community.
- The Reverend Monsignor Bernard Edward Tottman – of Wellington. For services to the community.
- Norman Richard Tvrdeić JP – of Greymouth. For services to mining and the community.
- Gregory Thomas Yelavich – of Auckland. For services to sport.

Military division

- Acting Major James Anthony Hill – Corps of Royal New Zealand Engineers.
- Warrant Officer Brian William White – Royal New Zealand Air Force.
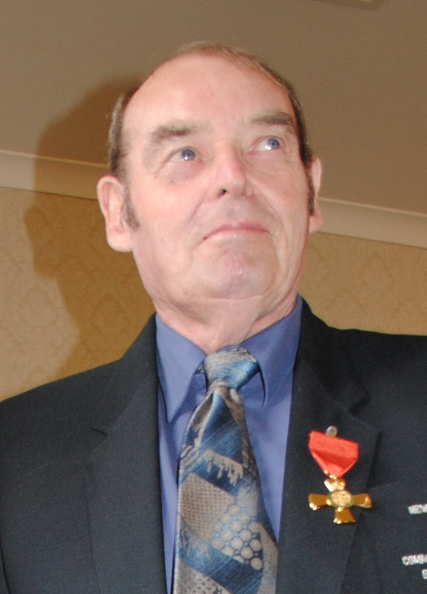
Kevin Barry

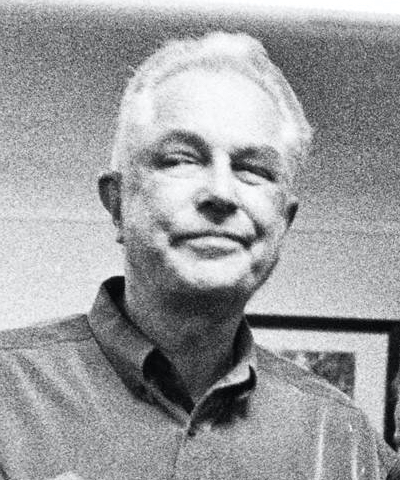
Max Cryer

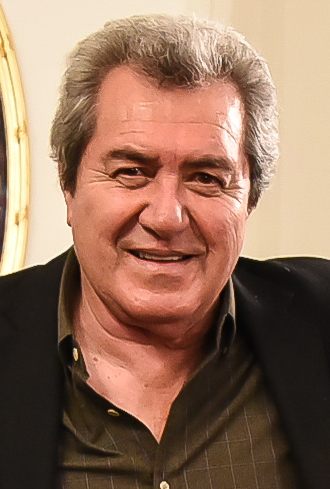
Alan Duff

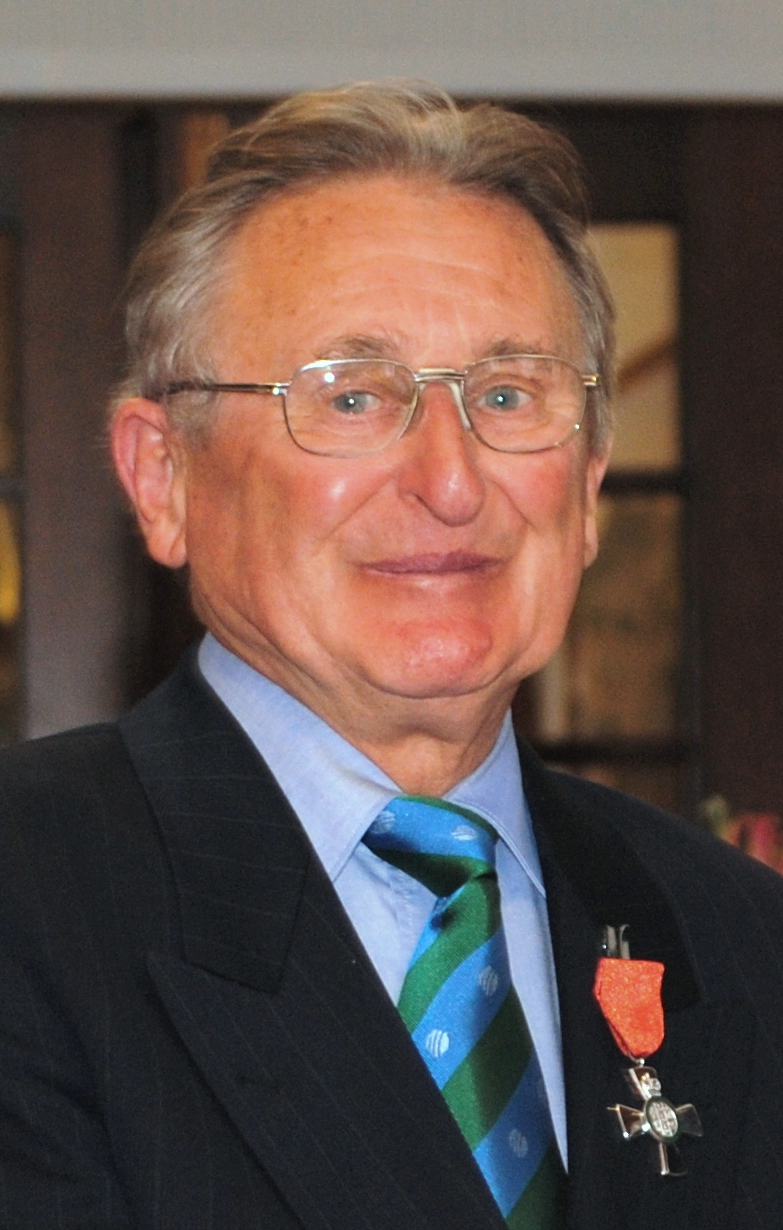
Don Neely

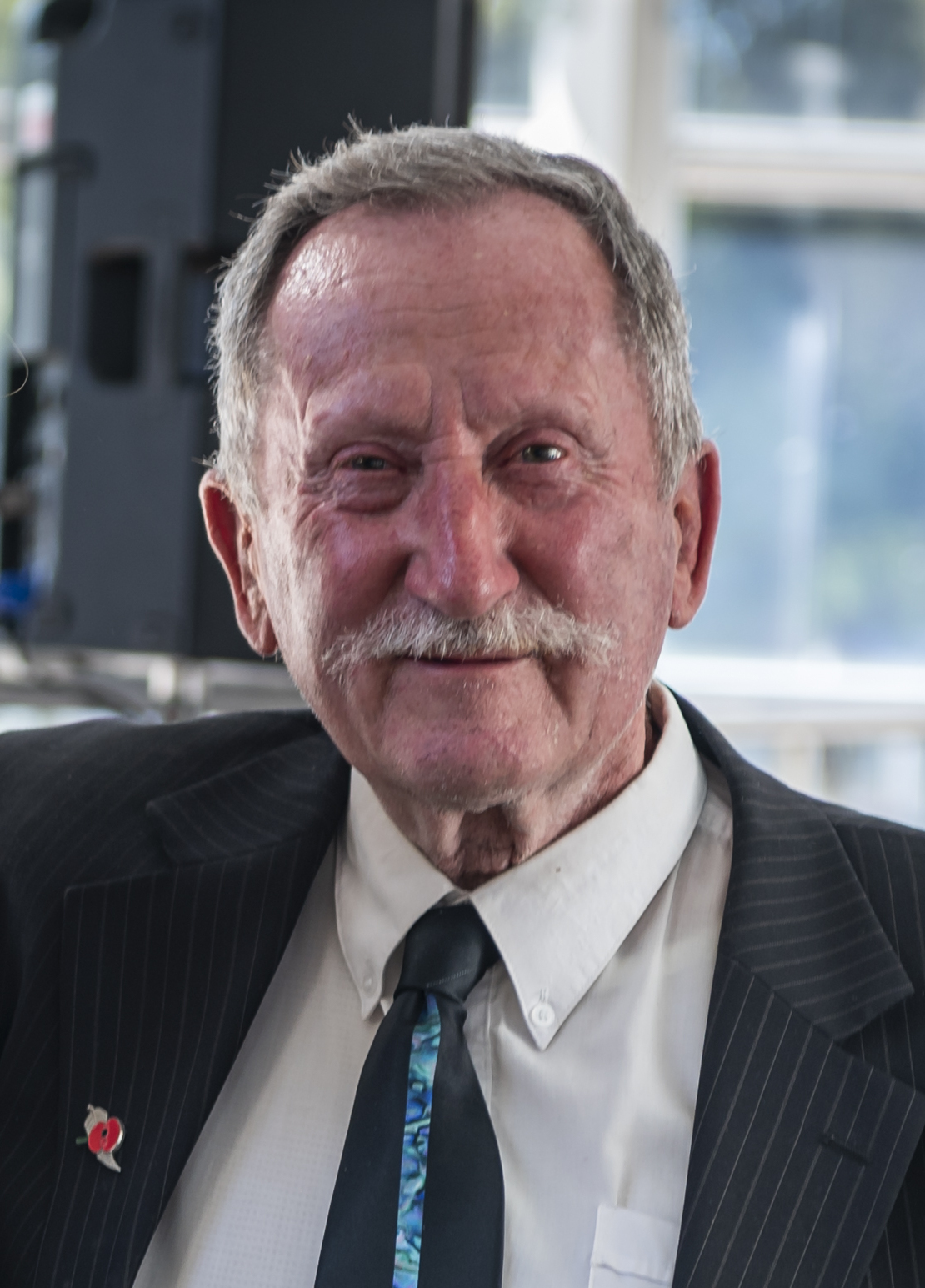
Terry Ryan

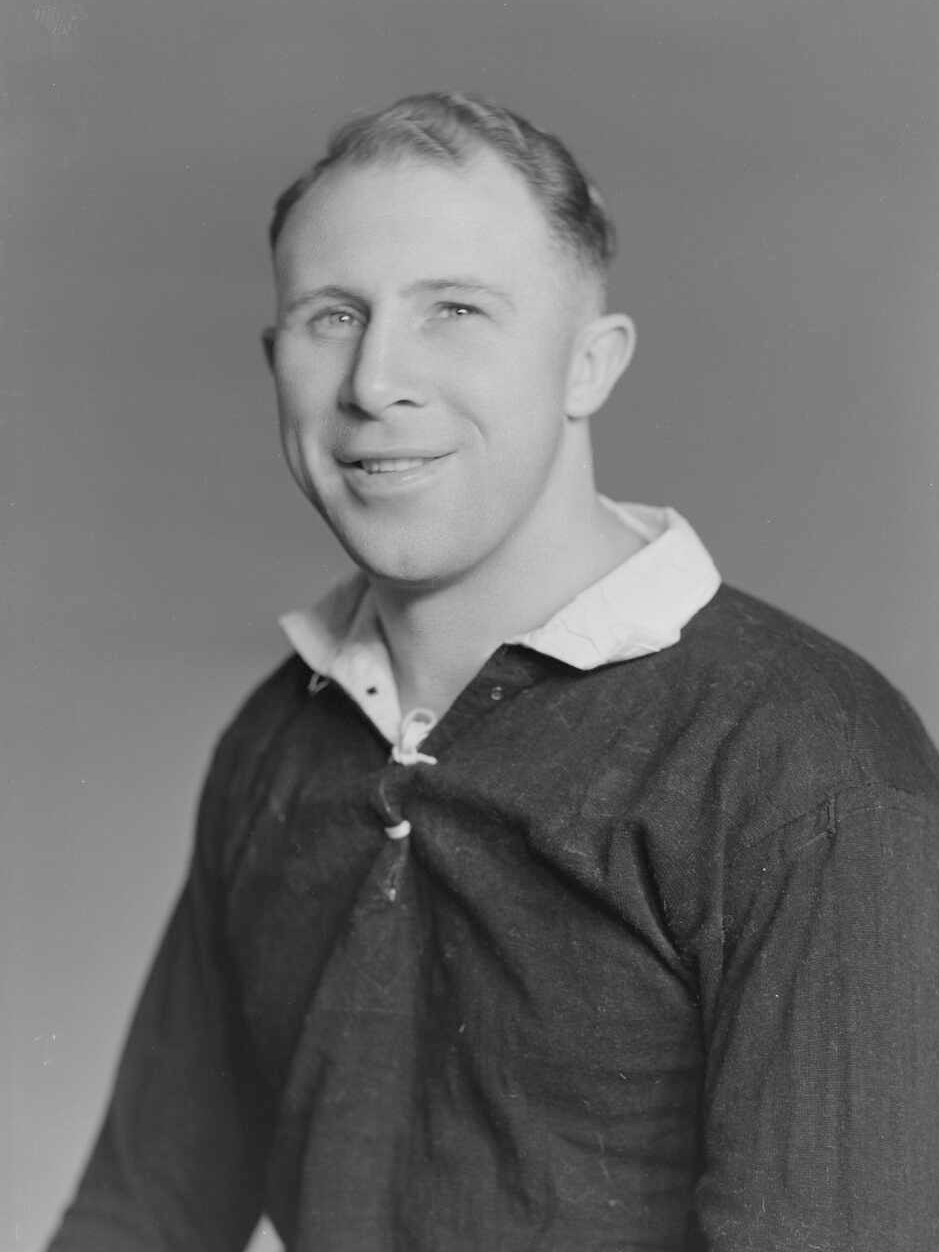
Bob Scott

== British Empire Medal (BEM) ==
Military division

- Chief Petty Officer Physical Training Instructor Michael James Te Hurunui Hohapata – Royal New Zealand Navy.
- Staff Sergeant Timothy John Hemi – Royal Regiment of New Zealand Artillery.
- Flight Sergeant Graeme Leonard John Pleasants – Royal New Zealand Air Force.

== Companion of the Queen's Service Order (QSO) ==
=== For community service ===
- James Kenneth Aitkenhead – of Auckland.
- Judith Ann Baird – of Auckland.
- Rose, Lady Henare – of Kawiti, Northland.
- Anne Jacqueline Holden JP – of Wellington.
- Dr Kenneth John McNaught – of Wellington.
- Mary Madeline Sophie Moodie – of Christchurch.
- Wing Commander William John Simpson DFC – of Auckland; Royal New Zealand Air Force (Retired)

=== For public services ===
- John Stratton Davies – of Queenstown.
- Alva Mary Faul – of Invercargill.
- Ruth Gotlieb – of Wellington.
- Denis James Hogan – of Christchurch.
- The Reverend Brother Patrick Celestine Ryan – of Dunedin.
- Shirley Thecla Smith – of Wellington.
- Ormond Tate – of Plimmerton.
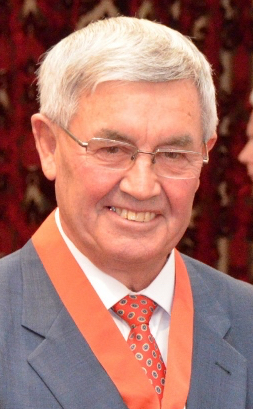
John Davies

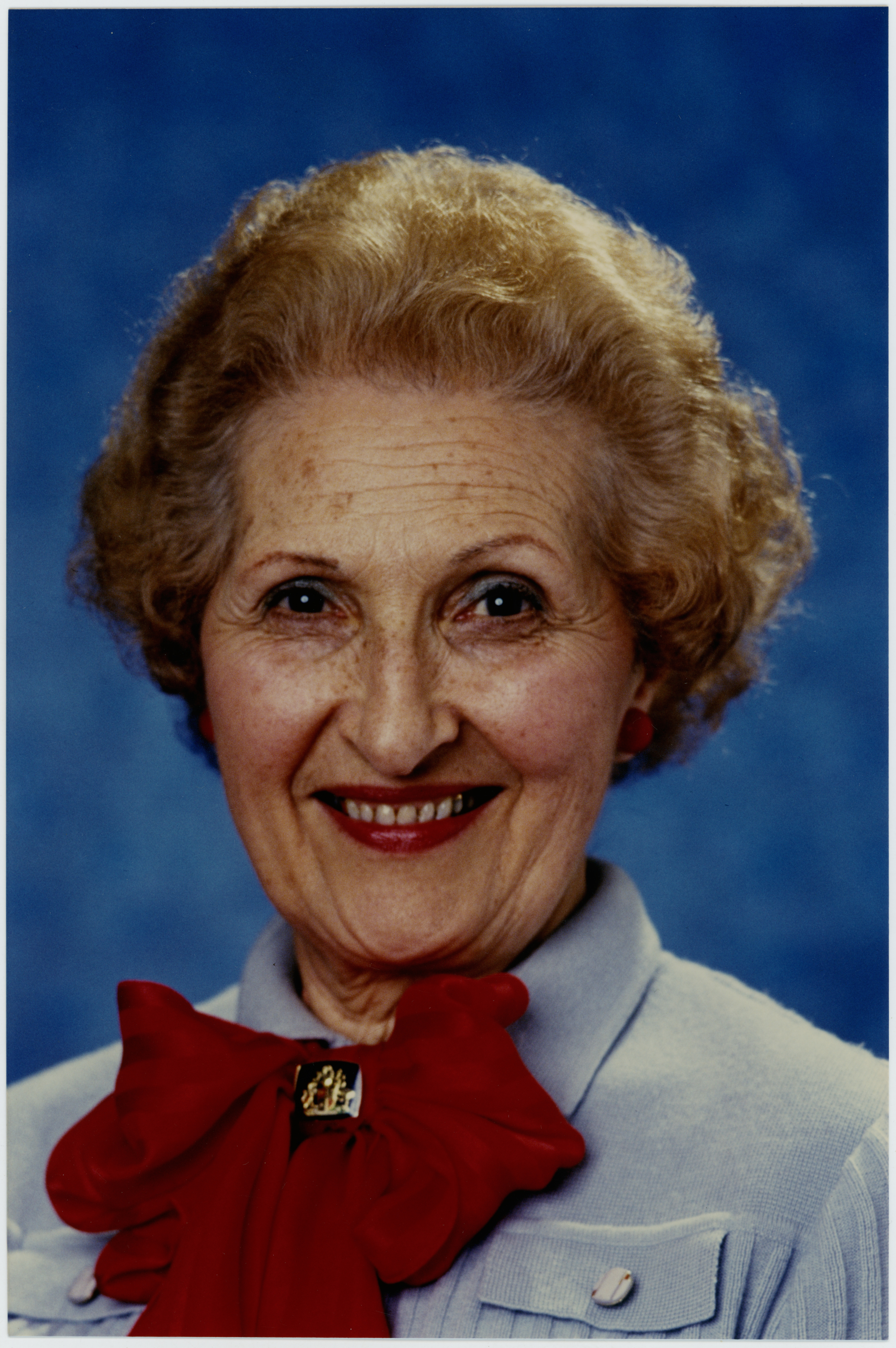
Ruth Gotlieb

== Queen's Service Medal (QSM) ==
=== For community service ===
- William Millward Aldcroft – of Balclutha.
- Rosa Florence Bennett – of Ashburton.
- Edith Rona Blows – of Tokoroa.
- Emma Rosanna Brown – of Hastings.
- Joan Winfred Cranston (Sister Mary Constance) – of Upper Hutt.
- Maureen Helen Cullen – of Kerikeri.
- William Jonathan Cullen – of Kerikeri.
- Eileen Mona Delaney – of Te Awamutu.
- The Reverend Father Andrew John Faith – of Auckland.
- Brenda Louise Fine – of Hastings.
- Marie Ruth Fletcher – of New Plymouth.
- Norma Elizabeth Hall – of Blenheim.
- Irene Maud Harris – of Auckland.
- Elsie Flora Hough – of Chatham Islands.
- Elva May Jackson – of Auckland.
- Beatrice Robina Laurie – of Wellington.
- Cicely Margaret Lawler – of Auckland.
- Donald James Liddle – of Waikanae.
- Ronald Duncan McCallum – of Maungaturoto.
- Kelvin Clive Mytton – of Motueka.
- Irene Alice Payne – of Timaru.
- Pamela Elizabeth Maud Pearce JP – of Featherston.
- Crystal Amelia Phillips – of Glentunnel.
- Cecil Leonard Pratley – of Upper Hutt
- Terence Norman Price – of Blenheim.
- Annie Violet Allona Priestley – of Wellington.
- Doris Louisa Quertier – of Gore.
- Peter Alexander Reid – of Whakatāne.
- Maudie Ruaka Tamehana Reweti – of Wanganui.
- Jean Williams Runciman – of Christchurch.
- Patrick Snoxell – of Feilding.
- Kailelei Iokapeta Iosua Tepou – of Auckland.
- Marion Rae Richardson Thomas – of Auckland.
- Valerie Wilson Williams – of Bluff.

=== For public services ===
- Thomas Norman Barton JP – of Auckland.
- Peter George Bennett – of Ross; senior constable, New Zealand Police.
- Margery Isobel Blackman – of Dunedin.
- Beverley Mayo Bremner – of Hamilton.
- Catherine Elizabeth Brown JP – of Canterbury.
- Tufnell Gifford Burchell – of Te Awamutu.
- Dr James Norman Grieve Davidson – of Whangārei.
- Keith Lawrence Davis – of Hamilton.
- Dr Minas Elias – of Auckland.
- Relda Averil Familton – of Wellington.
- Desmond Ivan George – of Foxton.
- Marjorie Aline Gordon – of Levin.
- John Alwin Hateley – of Wellington.
- Ewen James Laurenson – of Wellington.
- Gillian Rose Laurenson – of Wellington.
- Nellie Doreen Leicester – of Auckland.
- Marion June McCullough – of Auckland.
- Marcus Wintere Madill – of Matamata.
- Marvin David Mead – of Hamilton.
- John McKenzie Miller JP – of Ōtorohanga.
- Rita Evadney Minehan – of Timaru.
- Mary Elizabeth Nathan – of Auckland.
- Kathleen Barbara Nicholls – of Taupō.
- Peter John Pellew JP – of Auckland.
- Norah Reid – of Tauranga.
- Charles George Richardson JP – of Balclutha.
- The Reverend Doreen Mary Riddell – of Hamilton.
- Noreen Mary Rodgers – of Nelson.
- Owen Raymond Sanders – of Wellington.
- Lieutenant Colonel William Alexander Simpson – of Waikanae; Royal New Zealand Armoured Corps (Retired)
- Dorothy Jeanette Stevens – of Pukekohe.
- Mary Moana Taylor – of Picton.
- Fiona Margaret Withiel Thompson – of Auckland.
- Barbara Hutton Walter – of Te Awamutu.
- Margaret Esther Wright – of Christchurch; senior sergeant, New Zealand Police.

== Queen's Fire Services Medal (QFSM) ==
- William Ernest Brazier – chief fire officer, Paraparaumu Volunteer Fire Brigade, New Zealand Fire Service.
- Trevor Desmond Pollard – senior station officer, Titirangi Volunteer Fire Brigade, New Zealand Fire Service.
- Brian Stanley – senior station officer, Kawerau Volunteer Fire Brigade, New Zealand Fire Service.

== Queen's Police Medal (QPM) ==
- Peter Lawrence Robinson – of Dunedin; detective chief inspector, New Zealand Police.

== Royal Red Cross ==
=== Member (RRC) ===
- Lieutenant Colonel Daphne Margaret Shaw ARRC QHNS – Royal New Zealand Nursing Corps.

== Air Force Cross (AFC) ==
- Flight Lieutenant Bruce Anthony Craies – Royal New Zealand Air Force.

== Queen's Commendation for Valuable Service in the Air ==
- Acting Squadron Leader Michael Edward Yardley – Royal New Zealand Air Force.
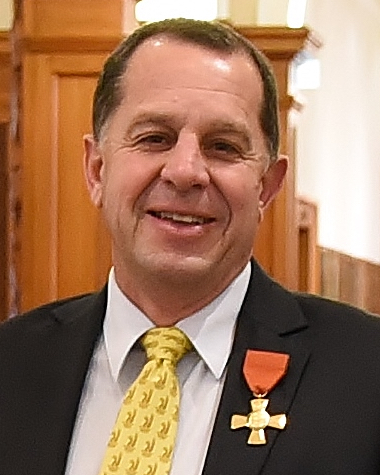
Mike Yardley
