= Freddie West =

British Royal Air Force officer

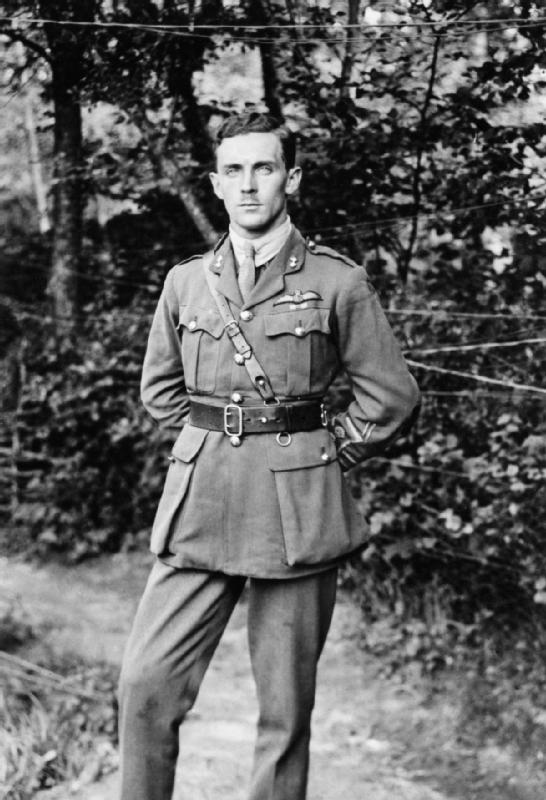
- West in 1918
- Born: 19 January 1896; Paddington, London
- Died: 8 July 1988 (aged 92); Windsor, Berkshire
- Burial place: Holy Trinity Churchyard, Sunningdale
- Military career
- Allegiance: United Kingdom
- Branch: British Army (1914–1918); Royal Air Force (1918–1946)
- Service years: 1914–1946
- Rank: Air Commodore
- Units: Royal Army Medical Corps; Royal Munster Fusiliers; Royal Flying Corps
- Commands: No. 50 Wing RAF (1939–1940); RAF Odiham (1938–1940); No. 4 Squadron RAF (1933–1936)
- Conflicts: First World War; Second World War
- Awards: Victoria Cross; Commander of the Order of the British Empire; Military Cross; Mentioned in Despatches; Knight of the Legion of Honour (France); Commander of the Order of Orange-Nassau (Netherlands); Commander of the Order of the Crown of Italy

Air Commodore Ferdinand Maurice Felix West, VC, CBE, MC (19 January 1896 – 8 July 1988) was a senior Royal Air Force officer, aviator, and an English recipient of the Victoria Cross, the highest award for gallantry in the face of the enemy that can be awarded to British and Commonwealth forces.

== Early life ==
Born in Paddington, London, on 19 January 1896, "Freddy" West was the son of an army officer killed in 1902 during the Second Boer War. His mother Clemence was French, née de la Garde de Saignes, and moved with him to Milan, Italy. He began study of International Law at the University of Genoa in 1913, then during the 1914 vacation took up a post in a Zurich bank.

His mother and nun aunt were friendly with Monsignor Achille Ratti, who later became Pope Pius XI. The young Freddie West went on at least one local climbing expedition with the future pope, and later in life attended a Vatican audience.

== First World War ==
When the First World War broke out he in 1914 joined the British Army, initially in the Royal Army Medical Corps as a private, before being commissioned in May 1915 and joining the Royal Munster Fusiliers. He arrived in France for service on the Western Front in November 1915.

After a flight in early 1917, West decided to transfer to the Royal Flying Corps, training as an observer at Brooklands, and sent back in France in April 1917 to No 3 Squadron, becoming a fully qualified observer in July 1917, having accumulated over 100 flying hours. After six months and 225 flying hours he was posted back to Britain to undergo pilot training at Grantham. He was then posted to No 8 Squadron in January 1918, flying Army co-operation duties with the infantry and tanks. Crewing up with Lt. William Haslam in March, West flew a series of hazardous sorties over the front, culminating with both men being awarded the Military Cross on 1 May 1918.

On 21 April 1918 West, flying with observer Grice, witnessed the last combat and fall of Manfred von Richthofen, Germany's leading fighter pilot.

On 18 June 1918, West's aircraft was attacked by four Pfalz D.III scouts. West personally claimed one shot down, and skillfully evaded the rest to return to base. The next day West was bounced by a group of Fokker DVII scouts, and West dropped to 200 feet altitude and flew through a network of kite balloons to escape.

=== Victoria Cross ===
He was 22 years old, and a captain in No. 8 Squadron, Royal Air Force during the First World War when the following deed took place for which he was awarded the VC.

On 12 August 1918, the British Army was intending to start a major offensive, but it needed information about the enemy positions. Setting off at dawn, West and his observer, Lt. John Alec Haslam, flying an Armstrong Whitworth FK 8 (serial number C8602), spotted an enemy concentration through a hole in the mist. Avoiding severe ground fire, almost immediately they came under attack from seven German fighter aircraft and West was hit in the leg, and his radio transmitter was smashed.

Continuing to identify his location, he remained under attack and manoeuvred his machine so skilfully that his observer was able to get several good bursts into the enemy machines, which drove them away. Only when he was sure of the enemy's position did he attempt to break off and head for his own lines. He twisted his trouser leg into a tourniquet to stem the flow of blood from his wounds. Unable to make his airfield West landed behind the Allied lines and insisted on reporting his findings despite being in excruciating agony. His left leg had five wounds, one of which had shattered his femur and cut the femoral artery, and had to be amputated.

Shortly afterwards he was invalided back to Britain, where on 9 November 1918 he learned that he had been awarded the Victoria Cross. After recovering from his amputation, West was fitted with an innovatively designed Swiss artificial leg.

== Royal Air Force ==
West was awarded a permanent commission in the RAF during 1919. Posted to RAF Uxbridge, he gradually returned to flying duties. He commanded No. 4 Squadron RAF in 1936, and was then appointed Air Attaché to Finland and the Baltic States. He was influential in the 1938 purchase of the Bristol Blenheim light bomber by the Finnish Air Force.

During World War II he commanded No. 50 Wing in France in late 1939. He was subsequently Air Attaché at the British Embassy in Rome in early 1940 and thereafter was part of the British Legation in Berne, where he assisted Allied airmen who had escaped into Switzerland. At one stage the German Gestapo put a price on his head because of his underground activities. He attempted to assist in the case of Princess Mafalda of Savoy, but could do little.

At the end of the war he was appointed a Commander of the Order of the British Empire (CBE) for his work.

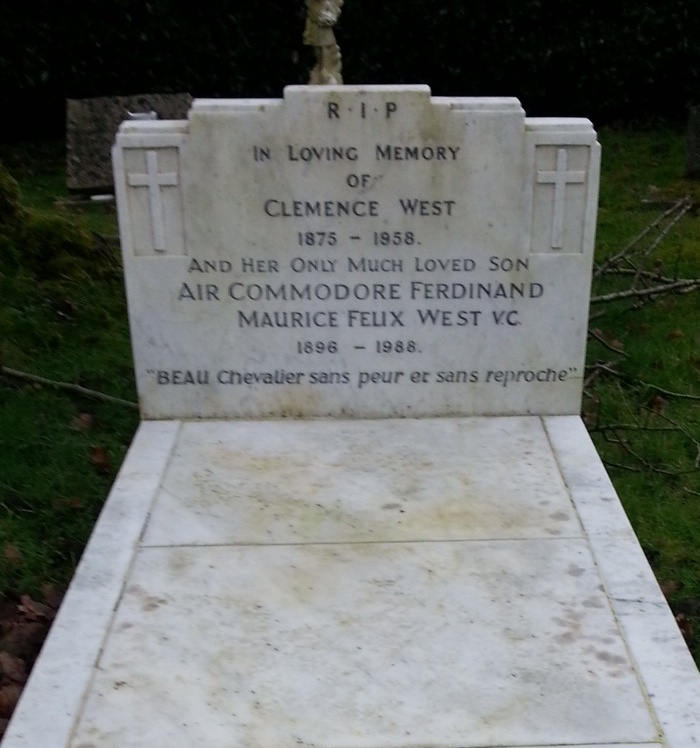
Grave of Air Commodore Freddie West VC situated in graveyard of Holy Trinity Church, Sunningdale

== Post-war and later life ==
West later achieved the rank of air commodore. With the end of the war in Europe, he retired from the RAF and joined J. Arthur Rank Film Distributors in January 1946, working in overseas sales. He became managing director in 1947 until 1958 when he retired as chairman. Subsequent directorships included Hurst Park Syndicate, Continental Shipyard Agencies, Technical Equipment Supplies Ltd, Tokalon Ltd and Terravia Trading Services.

West was interviewed on 27 May 1979 by the art historian Anna Malinovska. The interview is reproduced in Voices in Flight (Pen & Sword Books, 2006). He also appeared as a contributor in the 1987 documentary 'The Cavalry of the Clouds', produced by British regional commercial television station 'HTV West'. West's Victoria Cross is displayed at the Imperial War Museum.
