= Artie Combes =

Australian cricketer

Personal information
- Full name: Geoffrey Arthur Combes
- Born: 19 May 1913; Greymouth, New Zealand
- Died: 4 February 1997 (aged 83); Woodstock, Tasmania, Australia
- Batting: Right-handed
- Bowling: Slow left-arm orthodox
- Relatives: Maxwell Combes (brother)

Domestic team information
- Years: Team
- 1932-1947: Tasmania
- Source: Cricinfo, 6 March 2016

Geoffrey Arthur Combes (19 May 1913 – 4 February 1997) was an Australian cricketer. Born in 1913 in Greymouth, New Zealand, he played nine first-class matches for Tasmania between 1932 and 1947.

== First-class career ==
Combes made his debut for Tasmania in a match versus Victoria in March 1933 at the Richmond Cricket Ground in Melbourne. He scored 6 not out and 2 not out and took the wicket of Lindsay Hassett for 54 runs. After a couple of matches against Victoria during the 1933–34 season, he wasn't chosen for Tasmania again until early January 1936 when Victoria visited Hobart. His left-arm spin bowling was quite effective in both innings, returning figures of three for 42 off 18 overs and two for 24 off seven overs respectively. But it was with the bat he had most dramatic effect on the outcome, Tasmania winning by one wicket “…When the last batsman, G.A. Combes, came to the crease eight runs were needed in 8 minutes. When Zachariah commenced the final over, 5 runs were needed. Four singles were taken from the first six deliveries, Combes then hitting the seventh ball to the square leg boundary to give Tasmania victory by the slenderist margin with one ball to spare".

== Grade cricket ==
Combes in his first season of senior club cricket shared a success with his brother Max who won the TCA batting average, Artie winning the bowling average, and both of them being members of Kingston's premiership team.

Combes scored a fast unbeaten century for Kingborough versus Sandy Bay during the TCA1934-35 season. His 109 not out came in less than 80 minutes and included ten 6's.

== Personal life ==
Combes served in the Australian Army during World War Two.

After the war, he became well known as a farmer in the Huon Valley district.

== See also ==
- List of Tasmanian representative cricketers
