= Peter Grayburn =

New Zealand businessman (1925–2022)

Peter Grayburn CBE JP
- Born: Peter Watson Grayburn; 25 October 1925
- Died: 19 February 2022 (aged 96)
- Occupation: Businessman

Peter Watson Grayburn CBE JP (25 October 1925 – 19 February 2022) was a New Zealand businessman and company director.

== Biography ==
Born on 25 October 1925, Grayburn was the son of Fred Watson Grayburn, a veteran of the Gallipoli landings, and Vera Maud Watson (née Chalmers). He was educated at Geraldine District High School, and graduated from Victoria University College in 1949 with a Bachelor of Commerce degree. During World War II, Grayburn trained as an air force pilot, but the war ended before he completed training, and he served in Japan as part of J Force after the end of hostilities.

Grayburn became a chartered accountant, and moved to Auckland in the early 1960s, joining with Rolf Porter and John Wigglesworth to form the accounting practice of Porter, Wigglesworth and Grayburn. He was prominent as a company director, and served as chairman of companies including Ceramco, Cavalier, and Kupe Group, and served on the boards of others including Salmond Smith Biolab and Corporate Investments Ltd.

In the 1995 New Year Honours, Grayburn was appointed a Commander of the Order of the British Empire, for services to business management. In 2001, he was elected a distinguished fellow of the New Zealand Institute of Directors. Grayburn died on 19 February 2022, at the age of 96.
