= No. 4 Squadron RAF =

Flying squadron of the Royal Air Force

No. IV Squadron RAF
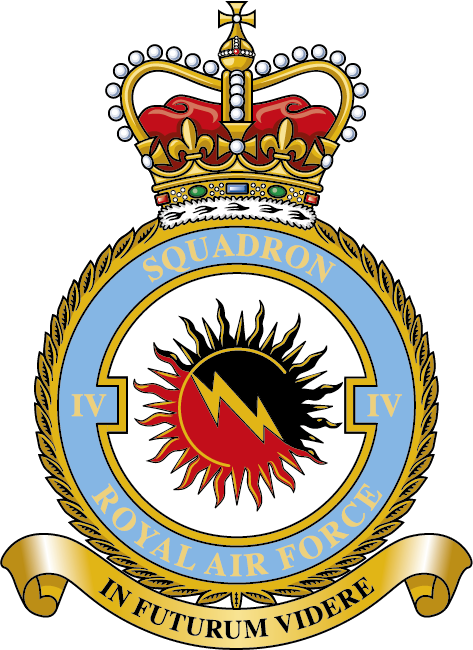
- Squadron badge
- Active: 1912–1918 (RFC); 1918–1945; 1945–1960; 1961–2010; 2010–2011; 2011–present
- Country: United Kingdom
- Branch: Royal Air Force
- Type: Flying training squadron
- Role: Advanced fast jet flying training
- Part of: No. 22 Group; No. 4 Flying Training School
- Station: RAF Valley
- Mottos: In futurum videre (Latin for 'To see into the future')
- Aircraft: BAE Systems Hawk T2

Insignia
- Roundel

No. 4 Squadron, also known as No. IV Squadron, is a squadron of the Royal Air Force. Since November 2011, it has operated the BAE Hawk T2 from RAF Valley, Anglesey, Wales. The squadron provides weapons and tactics training for student pilots after they have completed their conversion to jet aircraft with No. XXV(F) Squadron. Between 1970 and January 2011, the squadron operated various variants of the Hawker Siddeley Harrier and British Aerospace Harrier II.

== History ==
=== Formation and First World War (1912–1919) ===
No. 4 Squadron formed at Farnborough in 1912 as part of the Royal Flying Corps. Operating a mixture of aircraft including early versions of the Royal Aircraft Factory B.E.2 and Breguet biplane, the squadron quickly moved to Netheravon where it remained until the outbreak of the First World War. The more useful aircraft in its inventory were sent to France under the command of Major G. H. Rayleigh on 16 August 1914, to carry out reconnaissance in support of the British Expeditionary Force. On 19 August Lieutenant G. W. Mapplebeck flew the squadron's first mission over France, a reconnaissance flight searching for German cavalry in the vicinity of Gembloux, Belgium. Other aircraft remained in England to carry out anti-Zeppelin patrols.

The contingent in France was reinforced on 20 September by the personnel who had remained behind in England, forming C Flight, equipped with the Maurice Farman MF.11 Shorthorn. It concentrated on the reconnaissance role, standardising on the B.E.2 in 1916. In the Battle of the Somme, the squadron flew contact patrols keeping track of the position of advancing troops at low level, in addition to more regular reconnaissance and artillery spotting missions. It re-equipped with the Royal Aircraft Factory R.E.8 in June 1917, in time to take part in the Battle of Messines and the Battle of Passchendaele. During this period William Robinson Clarke, the first black pilot to serve for Britain, flew for the squadron. It remained equipped with the R.E.8 until the Armistice with Germany on 11 November 1918 ended the fighting. The squadron returned to the United Kingdom in February 1919 as a cadre.

=== Between the wars (1920–1939) ===
No. 4 Squadron returned to full strength on 30 April 1920 at Farnborough, equipped with Bristol F.2 Fighters. Part of the squadron moved to Aldergrove near Belfast in November 1920 as a result of the Irish War of Independence, moving to Baldonnel Aerodrome near Dublin in May 1921, before rejoining the rest of the squadron at Farnborough in January 1922. The squadron deployed on Royal Navy aircraft carriers when they sailed to Turkey on HMS Ark Royal and Argus during the Chanak crisis in August 1922, returning to Farnborough in September 1923. When the 1926 General Strike broke out, the squadron's aircraft were used to patrol railway lines to deter feared sabotage.

In October 1929, the elderly Bristol Fighters were replaced with new Armstrong Whitworth Atlas, purpose-designed for the squadron's army co-operation role. These in turn were replaced by Hawker Audaxes in December 1931. In February 1937, it moved from Farnborough to RAF Odiham, soon re-equipping with the Hawker Hector, a more powerful derivative of the Audax. In January 1939, it discarded its Hector biplanes in favour of the new monoplane Westland Lysander.

=== Second World War (1939–1945) ===
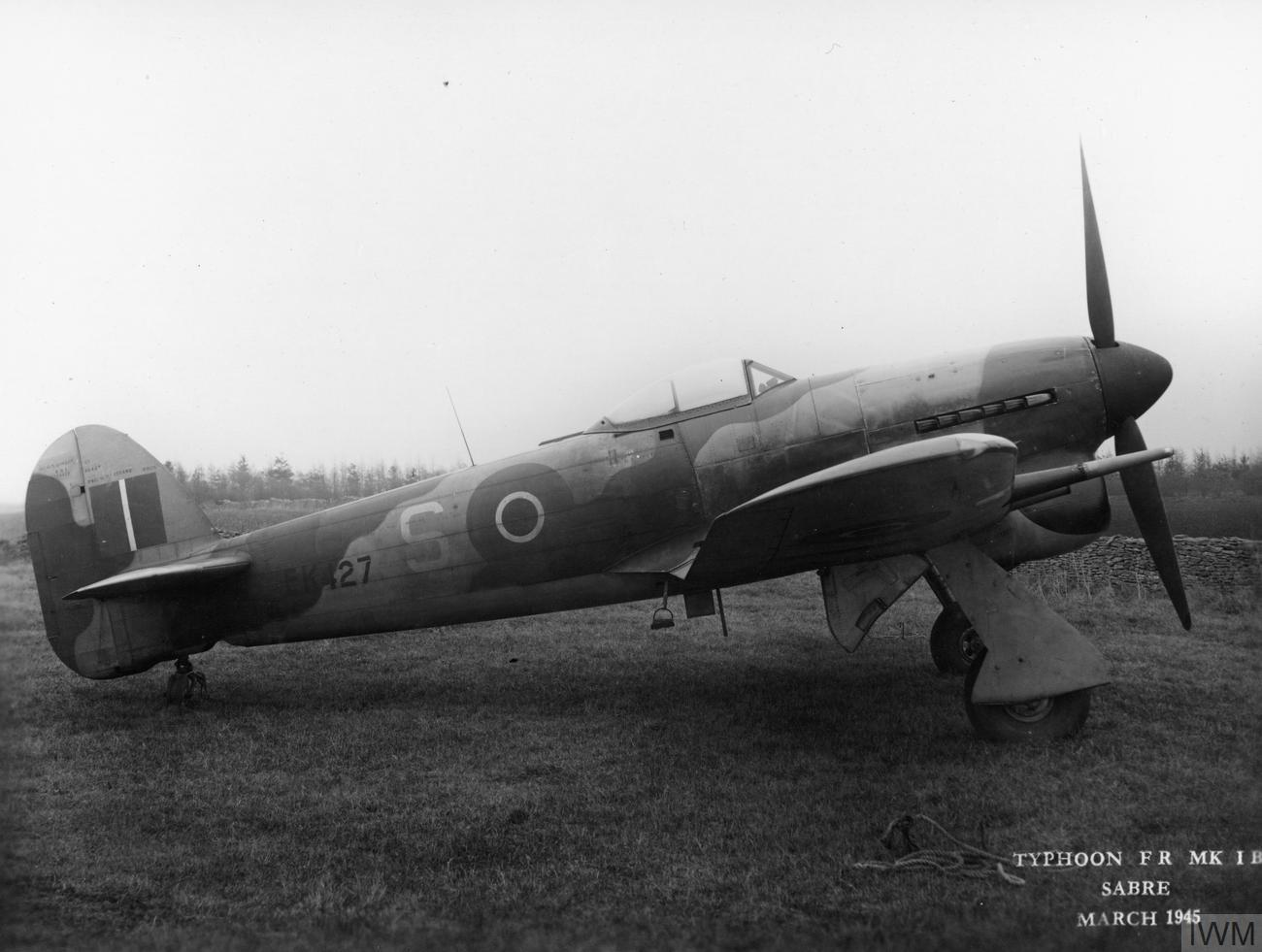
A No. 4 Squadron Hawker Typhoon FR.IB during 1945

Shortly after the outbreak of the Second World War in 1939, the squadron moved to France as part of the British Expeditionary Force. Following Germany's invasion of France and the Low Countries on 10 May 1940, the squadron was frequently forced to change bases by the approach of the advancing German armies, being withdrawn to the UK on 24 May. Losses had been heavy, with 18 aircrew killed, while 60% of the groundcrew were lost. It continued in the coastal patrol and air-sea rescue role while training for its main army co-operation role after returning to the UK.

In 1942, the squadron changed its mission from the army co-operation role, where it would operate fairly low-performance aircraft from airstrips close to the front-line, to that of fighter-reconnaissance, receiving the more modern Curtiss Tomahawk and North American Mustang, with the latter soon replacing Tomahawk, flying low-level attack and reconnaissance flights against targets on the continent.

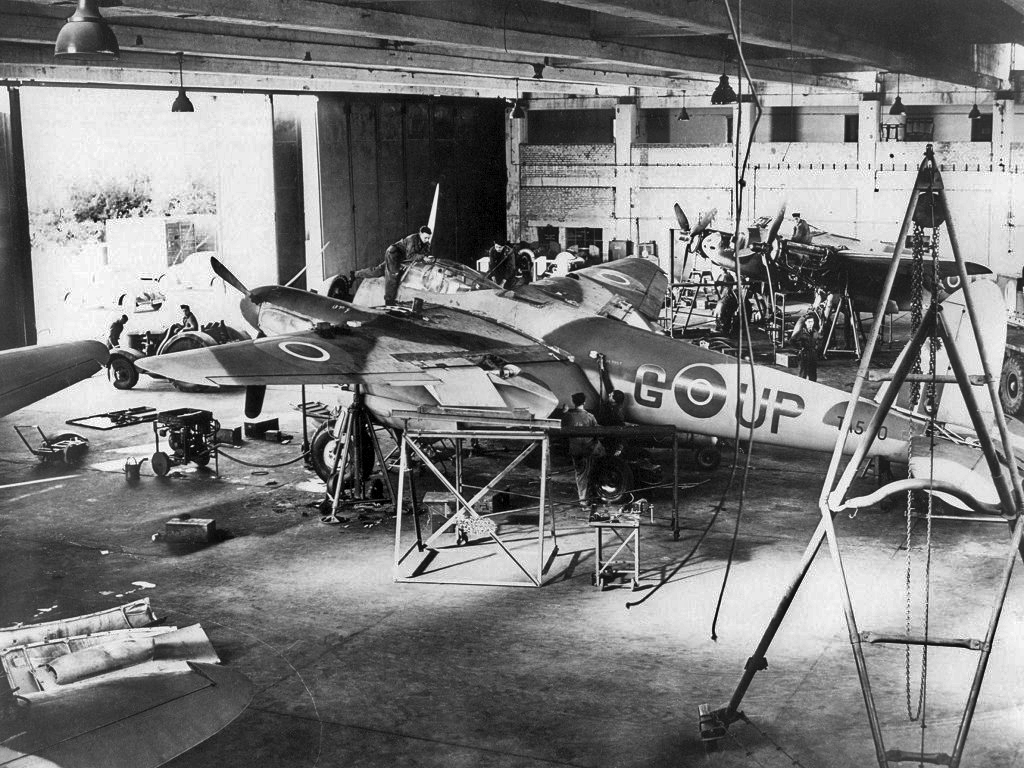
de Havilland Mosquitos of No. 4 Squadron undergoing repair during 1945

In August 1943, it joined the Second Tactical Air Force in support of the planned invasion of Europe, changing to the pure reconnaissance mission in January, and replacing its Mustangs with the Mosquito PR.XVI and Spitfire PR.XI. It discarded its Mosquitoes in June, moved to France in August, and briefly supplemented its Spitfires with a few Hawker Typhoons for low-level reconnaissance. It retained its Spitfires at VE Day, moving to Celle in Germany to carry out survey operations in support of the British Army of Occupation until it was disbanded on 31 August 1945.

=== Post-war and Cold War (1946–1999) ===
The squadron reformed the next day by renumbering No. 605 Squadron, a light bomber squadron equipped with Mosquitoes based at Volkel in the Netherlands. It re-equipped with de Havilland Vampire fighter-bombers in July 1950, replacing them with North American Sabres in October 1953. The Sabres were discarded in favour of the Hawker Hunter in July 1955, retaining these until the squadron disbanded at RAF Jever on 31 December 1960.

Again, the squadron did not remain dormant for long, as it reformed on 1 January 1961 by renumbering No. 79 Squadron, flying the Hunter FR.10 in the low-level reconnaissance role. It re-equipped with the Hawker-Siddeley Harrier in 1970, first flying from RAF Wildenrath in West Germany. It moved on to RAF Gütersloh in 1977.

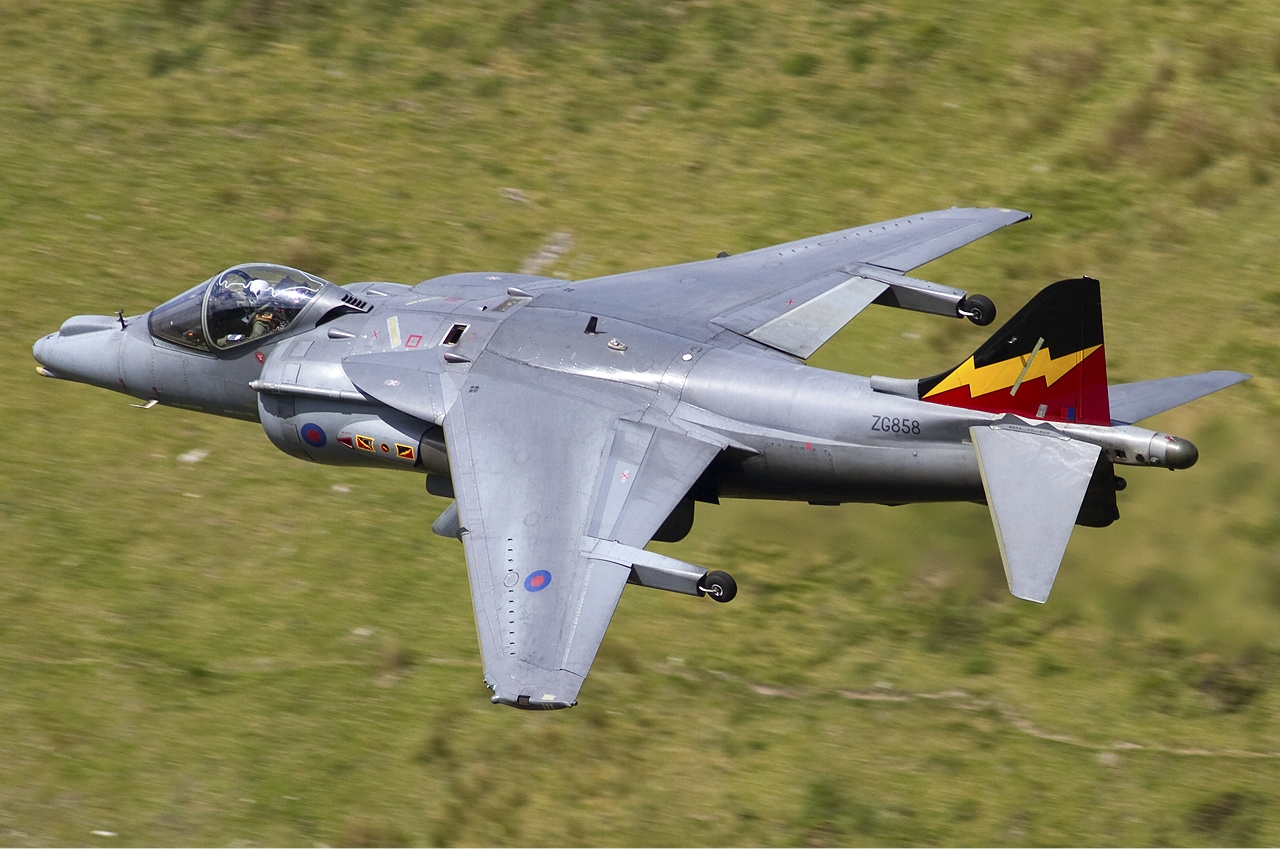
A Harrier GR9 of No. 4 Squadron wearing special tail marking during 2010

The squadron operated the Harrier until the final withdrawal of the type, receiving numerous upgrades and new versions over the years. In April 1999, the squadron left Germany to move to RAF Cottesmore.

=== 21st century (2000–present) ===
On 31 March 2010, the squadron disbanded and reformed as No. 4 (Reserve) Squadron at RAF Wittering, taking over from No. 20 (R) Squadron as the Harrier Operational Conversion Unit. As a result of the 2010 Strategic Defence and Security Review, the squadron disbanded in January 2011, only to reform on 24 November 2011, when No. 19 (R) Squadron, operating the BAE Hawk T2 from RAF Valley in the tactical weapons training role, was renumbered.

In March 2020, the squadron was awarded the right to emblazon a battle honour on its squadron standard, recognising its role in Bosnia during 1995.

== Aircraft operated ==
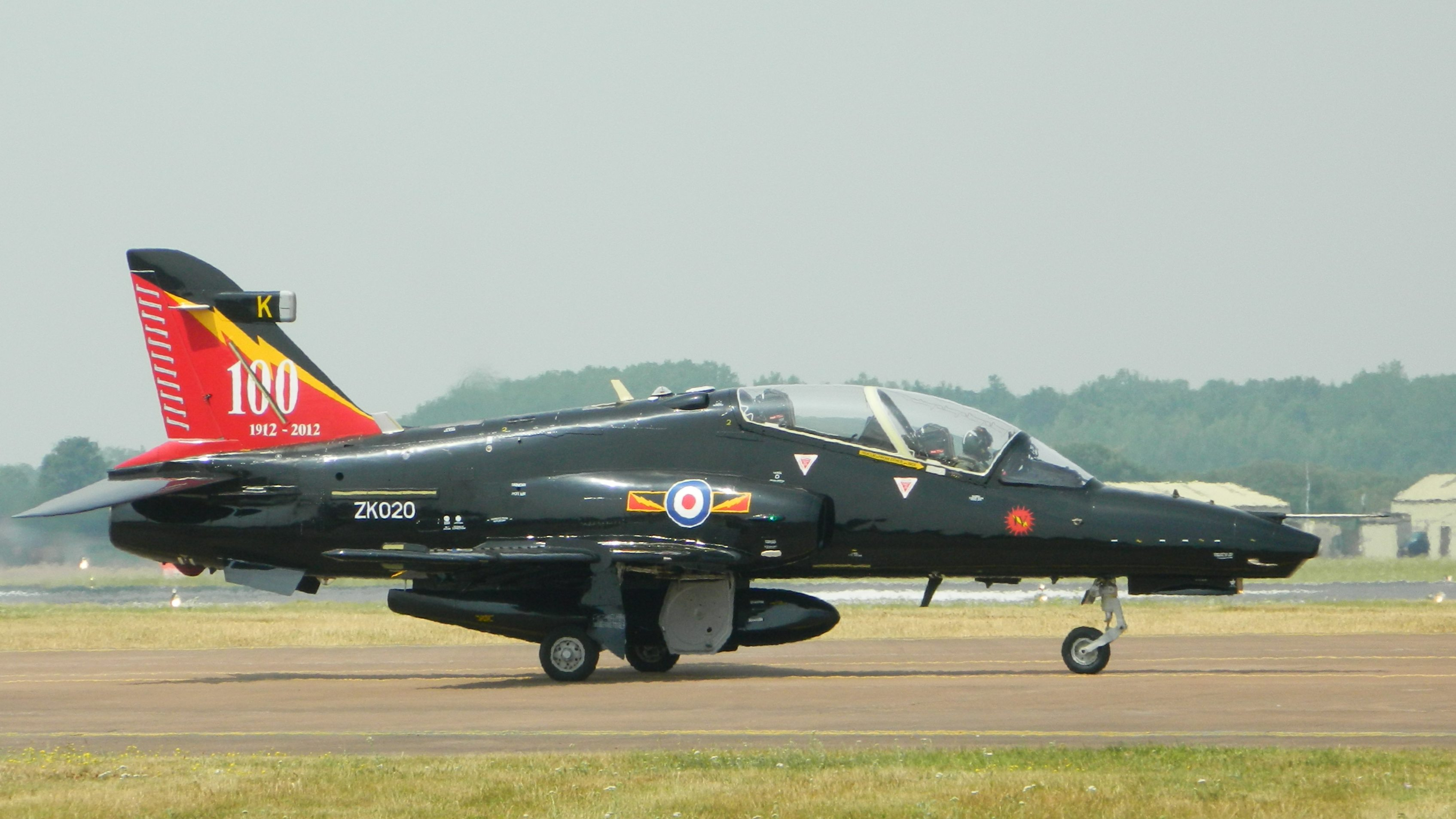
A Hawk T2 with commemorative paint scheme celebrating the 100th anniversary of the squadron in 2012

Aircraft operated have included:

- Breguet Type III
- Cody V biplane
- Avro 500
- Farman MF.11
- Voisin III
- Morane-Saulnier H
- Bristol Scout
- Martinsyde S.1
- Caudron G.III
- Royal Aircraft Factory B.E.2
- Royal Aircraft Factory R.E.8
- Bristol F.2 Fighter
- Armstrong Whitworth Atlas
- Hawker Audax
- Hawker Hector
- Westland Lysander
- Curtiss Tomahawk
- North American Mustang
- de Havilland Mosquito
- Supermarine Spitfire
- Hawker Typhoon
- de Havilland Vampire
- North American Sabre
- Hawker Hunter
- Hawker Siddeley Harrier GR.1, GR.3 and T.4
- BAE Harrier II GR7, GR7A, GR9 and T12
- BAE Hawk T2

== Heritage ==
Approved by King Edward VIII in May 1936, the squadron's badge features a sun in splendour divided per bend by a flash of lightning. The red and black segmented sun suggests round-the-clock operations (day and night), while the lightning flash is a reference to the unit's early use of wireless telephony for artillery co-operation.

The squadron's motto is In futurum videre (Latin for 'To see into the future').

== Battle honours ==
No. 4 Squadron has received the following battle honours. Those marked with an asterisk (*) may be emblazoned on the squadron standard.

- Western Front (1914–1918)*
- Mons (1914)
- Neuve Chappelle (1915)
- Somme (1916)
- Ypres (1917)
- Lys (1918)
- Somme (1918)*
- France and Low Countries (1939–1940)*
- Fortress Europe (1942–1944)
- France and Germany (1944–1945)*
- Normandy (1944)*
- Arnhem (1944)*
- Rhine (1944–1945)
- Bosnia (1995)*
- Afghanistan (2001–2014)
- Iraq (2003)*

== Commanding officers ==
Commanding officers have included:

Name	Date appointed
Major G. H. Raleigh	September 1912
Major H. R. P. Reynolds	20 January 1915
Major C. A. H. Longcroft	29 January 1915
Major F. F. Waldron	21 July 1915
Major G. E. Todd	29 September 1915
Major V. A. Barrington-Kennett	17 February 1916
Major T. W. C. Carthew	13 March 1916
Major L. Jenkins	20 September 1916
Major R. E. Saul	2 December 1917
Major H. B. Prior	6 January 1919
Squadron Leader C. H. B. Blount	30 March 1920
Squadron Leader J. C. Slessor	4 April 1925
Squadron Leader N. H. Bottomley	15 October 1928
Squadron Leader C. E. H. Medhurst	6 January 1930
Squadron Leader S. P. Simpson	3 January 1931
Squadron Leader F. M. F. West	4 October 1933
Squadron Leader E. J. K. McCloughry	16 January 1936
Squadron Leader G. H. Loughman	10 May 1937
Squadron Leader J. O. B. MacGregor	11 January 1938
Squadron Leader G. P. Charles	6 August 1939
Squadron Leader P. L. Donkin	7 September 1940
Wing Commander G. P. Charles	11 September 1940
Squadron Leader J. F. Maffett	29 October 1940
Wing Commander P. H. R. Saunders	9 December 1940
Wing Commander G. P. Charles	17 February 1941
Wing Commander P. H. R. Saunders	1 June 1941
Wing Commander G. E. Macdonald	29 October 1942
Squadron Leader R. H. D. Rigall	15 March 1943
Flight Lieutenant A. S. Baker	17 December 1943
Squadron Leader R. J. Hardiman	27 December 1943
Squadron Leader W. Shepherd	15 May 1944
Squadron Leader C. D. Harris-St. John	21 May 1945
Wing Commander M. P. C. Corkery	20 September 1945
Wing Commander R. L. Jones	15 May 1946
Squadron Leader B. Everton-Jones	15 November 1947
Squadron Leader C. P. N. Newman	14 September 1949
Squadron Leader P. G. K. Williamson	9 March 1951
Squadron Leader P. W. Gilpin	7 August 1953
Squadron Leader J. R. Chapman	5 December 1955
Squadron Leader T. J. McElhaw	2 September 1957
Squadron Leader R. J. Spiers	February 1959
Squadron Leader R. J. T. Buchanan	30 December 1960
Squadron Leader R. J. Bannard	7 November 1961
Squadron Leader W. J. Milner	December 1963
Squadron Leader E. J. E. Smith	November 1964
Squadron Leader A. J. Hopkins	7 June 1967
Wing Commander I. K. McKee	1 June 1970
Wing Commander L. A. B. Baker	28 August 1972
Wing Commander D. P. J. Melaniphy	28 October 1974
Wing Commander A. J. Chaplin	17 March 1977
Wing Commander I. C. H. Dick	11 May 1979
Wing Commander K. G. Holland	27 November 1981
Squadron Leader P. R. Webb	29 June 1982
Wing Commander A. J. M. McKeon	31 August 1982
Wing Commander P. V. Harris	24 May 1985
Wing Commander R. W. Gault	20 November 1987
Wing Commander M. G. F. White	11 May 1990
Wing Commander D. A. Haward	16 December 1991
Wing Commander C. H. Moran	8 April 1994
Wing Commander A. S. Kirkpatrick	25 May 1996
Wing Commander K. B. McCann	26 November 1998
Wing Commander A. J. Q. Suddards	9 April 2001
Wing Commander A. Offer	21 October 2003
Wing Commander I. W. Duguid	17 March 2006
Wing Commander H. Smyth	1 September 2008
Wing Commander L. S. Taylor	1 April 2010
Wing Commander S.P. Jessett	June 2010
Wing Commander R. Caine	July 2017

== See also ==
- List of Royal Air Force aircraft squadrons
