= Oscar Wrigley =

New Zealand cricketer

Personal information
- Full name: Oscar Llewellyn Wrigley
- Born: 6 August 1913; Wellington, New Zealand
- Died: 26 November 1987 (aged 74); Wellington, New Zealand
- Batting: Right-handed

Domestic team information
- Years: Team
- 1939/40–1940/41: Wellington
- Source: Cricinfo, 27 October 2020

Oscar Llewellyn Wrigley (6 August 1913 – 26 November 1987) was a New Zealand sportsman. He played in four first-class cricket matches between the 1939–40 to 1942–43 seasons and played representative rugby union for Otago.

Wrigley was born at Wellington in 1913 and educated at Rongotai College in the city. He made his first-class debut for Wellington in a December 1939 Plunket Shield match against Canterbury at the Basin Reserve, making scores of two and 12 runs in his two innings. He played against Otago later in the season and made a final appearance for Wellington against Canterbury during the following season.

During World War II Wrigley enlisted in the Royal New Zealand Air Force. He played his final first-class match for an Air Force side against one drawn from the New Zealand Army, scoring his only half-century in first-class cricket during the match.

Wrigley remained active in cricket, acting as a selector for Wellington age-group sides. He died in the city in 1987 aged 74. An obituary was published in the 1989 edition of Wisden Cricketers' Almanack.
