= Alexander Brown (engineer) =

Alexander Brown (23 February 1830 – 22 January 1913) was a New Zealand marine engineer, foundry and shipping company manager. He was born in Larkhall, Lanarkshire, Scotland on 23 February 1830.
