= Desmond Dunnet =

New Zealand cricketer

Personal information
- Full name: Desmond Murray Dunnet
- Born: 20 August 1913; Christchurch, New Zealand
- Died: 24 February 1980 (aged 66); Oxted, Surrey, England
- Batting: Right-handed
- Role: Wicket-keeper

Domestic team information
- Years: Team
- 1936/37–1946/47: Southland
- 1943/44–1944/45: Canterbury
- 1950/51: Otago

Career statistics
| Competition | First-class |
|---|---|
| Matches | 11 |
| Runs scored | 128 |
| Batting average | 14.22 |
| 100s/50s | 0/0 |
| Top score | 32 |
| Catches/stumpings | 11/10 |
- Source: Cricinfo, 1 December 2025

Desmond Murray Dunnet (20 August 1913 – 24 February 1980) was a New Zealand cricketer. A wicket-keeper, Dunnet played first-class cricket for Canterbury and Otago between the 1942–43 and 1950–51 seasons.

Dunnet was born at Christchurch in 1913 and educated at St Andrew's College, Christchurch. He sustained serious head injuries while coaching young cricketers in Gore in 1938, which necessitated three months in hospital. He returned to play cricket in the 1939–40 season and represented Southland. He served in the armed services in New Zealand during the Second World War, playing three first-class matches for services teams in 1943 and 1944. He played several matches for Canterbury in the mid-1940s, but only one Plunket Shield match, when he represented Otago in 1950–51.

Dunnet moved to England in 1953, where he was manager of the National Mortgage Company in London. He died suddenly at his home in Oxted, Surrey, in 1980, aged 66, leaving a widow and a son. An obituary was published in that year's New Zealand Cricket Almanack.
