= Nikola Nobilo =

New Zealand businessman and winemaker (1913–2007)

Nikola Nobilo OBE
- Born: 23 August 1913; Lumbarda, Korčula, Austria-Hungary
- Died: 28 August 2007 (aged 94)
- Occupation: winemaker
- Known for: Nobilo Wines

Nikola "Nick" Nobilo, OBE (23 August 1913 – 28 August 2007), was a New Zealand winemaker and founder of Nobilo Wines. He was originally from Austria-Hungary.

== Early life ==
Nobilo was born in present-day Croatia in 1913. His family's home village was Lumbarda, located on the island of Korčula. They had worked in the winemaking industry in Croatia for 300 years before Nobilo moved to New Zealand in the 1930s. Nobilo's uncle feared the signs of what would become World War II in Europe, and so ordered him to move to New Zealand. Nobilo worked as a stonemason before his emigration.

== Nobilo Wines ==
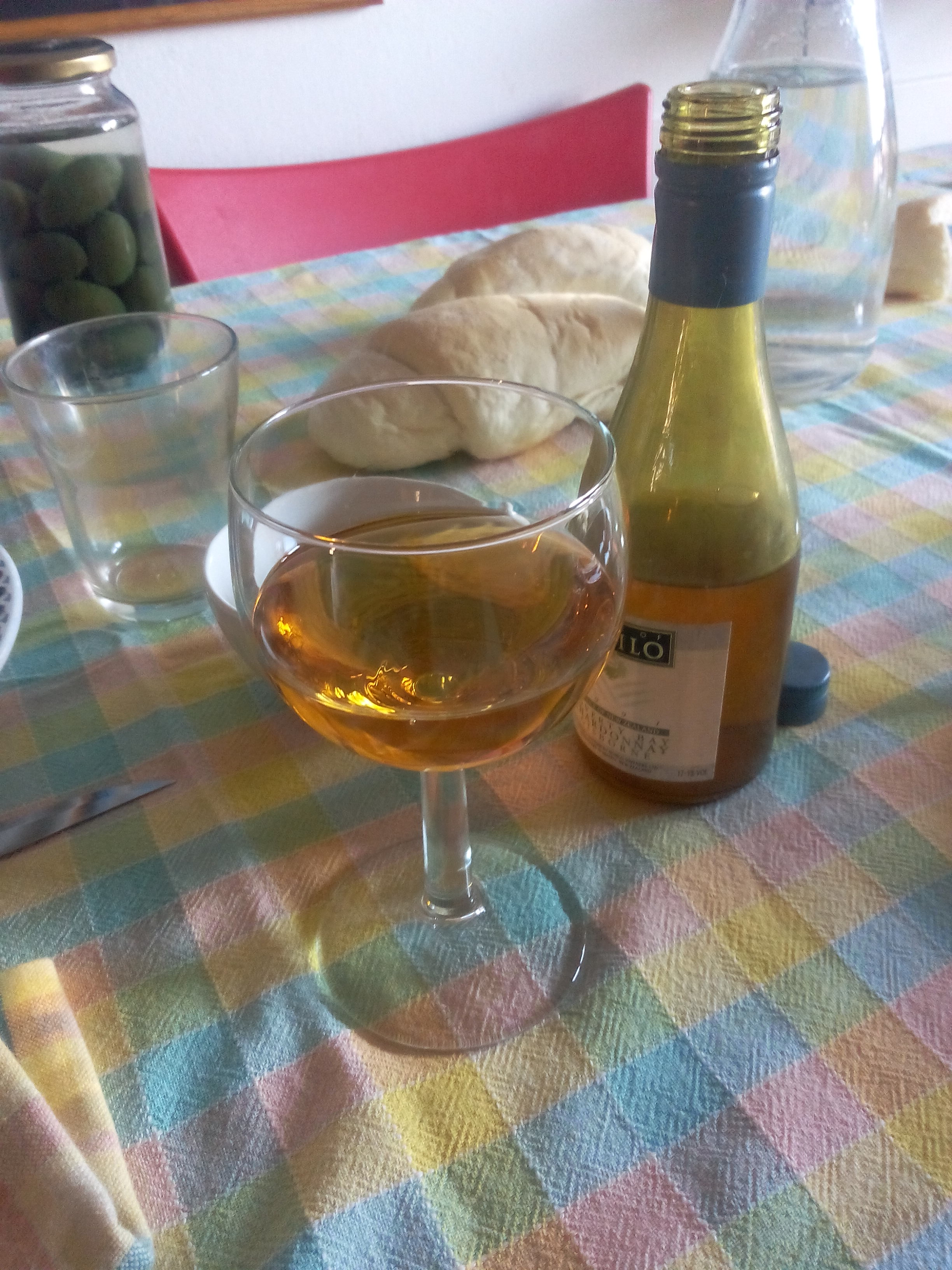
Poverty Bay Chardonnay Nobilo – New Zealand

Nobilo and his family arrived in New Zealand in 1937 and settled in Huapai, west of the city of Auckland. They began planting grapes in Huapai in 1943. Gradually the Nobilos led New Zealand's wine industry away from hybrid grapes to an emphasis on classic grape varieties which produce higher quality wines.

Nobilo came to head the family company, which grew to become one of New Zealand's largest winemakers. In the 1995 New Year Honours, he was appointed an Officer of the Order of the British Empire, for services to the viticulture industry.

In 1998, the company, then called Nobilo Vintners, purchased another award-winning New Zealand winemaker, Selaks. The Nobilo family company was, in turn, acquired by BRL Hardy, one of Australia's largest winemakers, 2000. BRL Hardy merged Nobilo with its Constellation Brands wines in 2003.

The new combined company, Constellation Wines, was able to distribute Nobilo wines throughout New Zealand, Australia, Europe and the Americas.

Nobilo continued to produce wines after the acquisition. Nobilo Wines were named New Zealand's wine producer of the year in 2003. Nobilo's sauvignon blanc also won the award for best sauvignon blanc at the international wine and spirit competition in 2000.

== Death ==
Nobilo died in Auckland on 28 August 2007 at the age of 94. His funeral was held at the Holy Trinity Cathedral in Auckland. He was survived by his wife, Zuva, and three sons, Steve, Nick and Mark and nine grandchildren, Nick, Steve, Teresa, Angela, Milan, Krista, Keita, Luke and Ashley.
