= John Mitchell (physicist) =

New Zealand physicist (1913–2007)

John Wesley Mitchell, FRS (3 December 1913 – 12 July 2007) was a New Zealand-born physicist.

He was born the son of an American surveyor in Christchurch, New Zealand and educated at Christchurch Boys' High School. Between 1931 and 1935 he studied chemistry and physics at Canterbury University College and was awarded a B.Sc. and M.Sc. In 1935 he sailed to England with an Exhibition Scholarship to take up a fellowship at Oxford University, where he worked under Professor Cyril Hinshelwood at Trinity College.

In 1938 he took a post to teach physics at Repton School, but when war broke out he joined the Armament Research Department at Woolwich Arsenal as a Scientific Officer. There he worked on problems related to ammunition, some of which involved the use of high-speed photography. He was later transferred to Fort Halstead in Kent to work in the Theoretical Physics Division on the analysis of shockwaves.

At the end of war in 1945 he moved to Bristol to work at the H.H. Wills Physical Laboratory of the University of Bristol. After a period studying deposited metal surfaces, he took the opportunity in 1948 to undertake a Kodak sponsored investigation into the behaviour of thin-sheet crystals of silver halides, a field of research that would dominate the rest of his career.

In 1956 he was elected a Fellow of the Royal Society for "his work on the borderline between physics and chemistry about the adsorption of gases on surfaces, on catalysis and on the processes occurring in photographic emulsions. With the latter end in view he has investigated in some detail the properties of silver halide crystals; he was the first to demonstrate networks of dislocations in a transparent crystal by making silver precipitate along them so that they become visible under the microscope. He has also shown by careful experimental work the role of the dislocations in providing sensitivity centres and their relation to such sensitisers as silver bromide. He has shown why the grains of the emulsions grow in a plate-like form with the octahedral faces exposed, and demonstrated the presence in such crystals of three dislocations meeting in a point, which determines the crystal form."

In 1959 he took up the offer of a professorship at the University of Virginia in Charlottesville, where he continued his studies of crystal dislocations until his retirement as Professor in 1979 and as Emeritus Professor and Senior Research Fellow in 1995. His tenure as Professor was broken in 1963 when he briefly returned to the UK to take up a position as Director of the National Chemical Laboratory, only for the NCL to be closed down the following year.

He died in 2007. He had married three times but had no children.

== Honours and awards ==
- 1955 Awarded C.V. Boys Prize (now known as the Moseley Medal and Prize) of the Institute of Physics
- 1956 Elected a Fellow of the Royal Society
- 1994 Awarded Progress Medal (RPS) of the Royal Photographic Society
