= Arthur Cutler (cricketer) =

New Zealand cricketer

Personal information
- Full name: Arthur Sydney Hamilton Cutler
- Born: 17 January 1913; Palmerston North, New Zealand
- Died: 27 August 1997 (aged 84); Invercargill, New Zealand
- Nickname: Ash
- Batting: Right-handed

Domestic team information
- Years: Team
- 1938/39–1946/47: Otago

Career statistics
Competition	First-class
Matches	7
Runs scored	211
Batting average	16.23
100s/50s	0/1
Top score	51
Balls bowled	12
Wickets	0
Bowling average	–
5 wickets in innings	–
10 wickets in match	–
Best bowling	–
Catches/stumpings	2/–
- Source: Cricinfo, 9 December 2020

Arthur Sydney Hamilton "Ash" Cutler (17 January 1913 – 27 August 1997) was a New Zealand cricketer. He played seven first-class matches for Otago between 1938 and 1947. Later he was a first-class umpire.

== Life and career ==
A middle-order batsman, Cutler played for Manawatu in the Hawke Cup from 1929 to 1937. He scored a century when Manawatu beat Taranaki to regain the title in December 1934; no other batsman on either team reached 50. He left Palmerston North in February 1937 to take up a position as teacher in charge of a school in the Southland Region.

Cutler married Flora Browne in Invercargill in December 1940. He worked as a schoolteacher and served overseas in the New Zealand Infantry Brigade during World War II as a second lieutenant.

Cutler's best first-class match for Otago was in the 1939–40 Plunket Shield, when he scored 51 and 33 against Auckland. In a low-scoring drawn two-day match in 1944–45, playing for Southland against Otago, Cutler scored 49 and 44; no other Southland batsman exceeded 17. He scored a century for Southland against Otago in 1946–47.

Cutler umpired 13 first-class matches in Dunedin between 1965 and 1974. He also umpired the second unofficial Test between New Zealand and Australia in 1969–70 at Lancaster Park in Christchurch. He umpired the second List A match in New Zealand, a match of 36 eight-ball overs each between Otago and the touring MCC in February 1971.

Cutler died at Invercargill in 1997 aged 84. An obituary was published in the following year's New Zealand Cricket Almanack.
