= Edward Lewis (minister) =

Edward Lewis (21 July 1831 – 23 May 1913) was a New Zealand Church of Christ minister. He was born in Pillgwenlly, Newport, Wales on 21 July 1831, and came to New Zealand with his family about ten years later. The family moved to Sydney in 1842, and Lewis became a bootmaker. Later, as a member and preacher for the Church of Christ, he became known as an evangelist through his laying on of hands about 1864.

== Career ==
In 1866, Lewis, his wife Mary Andrews, and their children, came to New Zealand and settled in the Nelson area. While still working as a bootmaker, he was active in the Church of Christ. In 1875 a group of churches employed him for a year, and for the rest of his life he worked on behalf of the church at various locations in both New Zealand and Australia.

He was regarded as "The Grand Old Man" of the Churches of Christ in New Zealand.

== Death ==
Lewis died on 23 May 1913. His wife lived for a further three years.
