= John Bush (New Zealand cricketer) =

New Zealand cricketer

Personal information
- Full name: Benjamin John Bush
- Born: 1867; Christchurch, New Zealand
- Died: 29 June 1913 (aged 45–46); Christchurch, New Zealand
- Role: Bowler

Domestic team information
- Years: Team
- 1887/88: Canterbury

Career statistics
Competition	First-class
Matches	1
Runs scored	10
Batting average	10.00
100s/50s	0/0
Top score	6*
Balls bowled	236
Wickets	8
Bowling average	7.37
5 wickets in innings	1
10 wickets in match	0
Best bowling	6/40
Catches/stumpings	1/–
- Source: Cricinfo, 26 October 2024

Benjamin John Bush (1867 – 29 June 1913) was a New Zealand cricketer. He played in one first-class match for Canterbury in 1887/88, opening the bowling with David Dunlop and taking eight wickets in the match, which Canterbury nevertheless lost.

Bush, who worked as a painter, suffered from epileptic fits. He was found unconscious in Moorhouse Avenue, Christchurch, one evening in June 1913, having apparently fallen and fractured his skull. He was taken to hospital but died the next day without regaining consciousness.
