= Maxwell Combes =

Australian cricketer

Personal information
- Born: 29 July 1911; Greymouth, New Zealand
- Died: 10 March 1983 (aged 71); Longley, Tasmania, Australia

Domestic team information
- Years: Team
- 1932-1939: Tasmania
- Source: Cricinfo, 6 March 2016

Maxwell Combes (29 July 1911 – 10 March 1983) was an Australian cricketer. Born in 1911 in Greymouth, New Zealand, he played ten first-class matches for Tasmania between 1932 and 1939.

== See also ==
- List of Tasmanian representative cricketers
