= Mick Randall =

New Zealand cricketer

- Randall during World War II

Personal information
- Full name: Clement Lindsay William Randall
- Born: 8 August 1913; Napier, New Zealand
- Died: 23 December 2007 (aged 94); Nelson, New Zealand
- Nickname: Mick
- Batting: Left-handed
- Bowling: Right-arm medium pace

Domestic team information
- Years: Team
- 1948/49–1950/51: Wellington

Career statistics
| Competition | First-class |
|---|---|
| Matches | 10 |
| Runs scored | 140 |
| Batting average | 12.72 |
| 100s/50s | 0/0 |
| Top score | 36 |
| Balls bowled | 1,609 |
| Wickets | 31 |
| Bowling average | 19.51 |
| 5 wickets in innings | 0 |
| 10 wickets in match | 0 |
| Best bowling | 3/18 |
| Catches/stumpings | 5/0 |
- Source: Cricinfo, 17 June 2023

Clement Lindsay William "Mick" Randall (8 August 1913 – 23 December 2007) was a New Zealand cricketer. He played in ten first-class matches for Wellington from 1948 to 1951.

== Life and career ==
Born in Napier, Randall attended Wellington Technical College and became an accountant. During World War II he served as a captain with the New Zealand Army in the South Pacific.

Randall was an accurate right-arm medium-pace bowler who was 35 years old when he played his first first-class match in December 1948. In Wellington's victory over Otago in the Plunket Shield in December 1949 he took three wickets in each innings, finishing with match figures of 41–14–62–6. A year later, in his last season, he had match figures of 19.3–2–36–5 against Central Districts.

Randall later served as president of the Wellington Cricket Association. He worked in Wellington, where he became a company director.
