= William Webb (cricketer, born 1872) =

New Zealand cricketer

Personal information
- Full name: William Arthur Alexander Webb
- Born: 1872; Mosgiel, Otago, New Zealand
- Died: 29 January 1913 (aged 40); Dunedin, Otago, New Zealand
- Bowling: Right-arm

Domestic team information
- Years: Team
- 1897/98–1900/01: Otago

Career statistics
Competition	First-class
Matches	7
Runs scored	83
Batting average	7.54
100s/50s	0/0
Top score	28
Balls bowled	780
Wickets	18
Bowling average	18.94
5 wickets in innings	1
10 wickets in match	0
Best bowling	5/42
Catches/stumpings	4/–
- Source: CricInfo, 19 February 2020

William Arthur Alexander Webb (1872 – 29 January 1913) was a New Zealand cricketer. He played seven first-class matches for Otago between the 1897–98 and 1900–01 seasons.

Webb was born at Mosgiel in Otago in 1872. A right-arm bowler, his best bowling figures came on Otago's northern tour in 1899–1900, when he took 5 for 42 in the second innings in a victory over Hawke's Bay. In a total of seven first-class matches he took 18 wickets. He also appeared for an Otago team against a Melbourne Cricket Club side during the 1899–1900 season in a match which is not considered to be first-class.

Ill-health led Webb to retire from cricket in his thirties, when he took up umpiring, but he died at Dunedin aged 40. His Dunedin cricket club, Opoho, forfeited its next match so its players could attend his funeral.
