= Henry C. Morrison =

American academic (1871–1945)

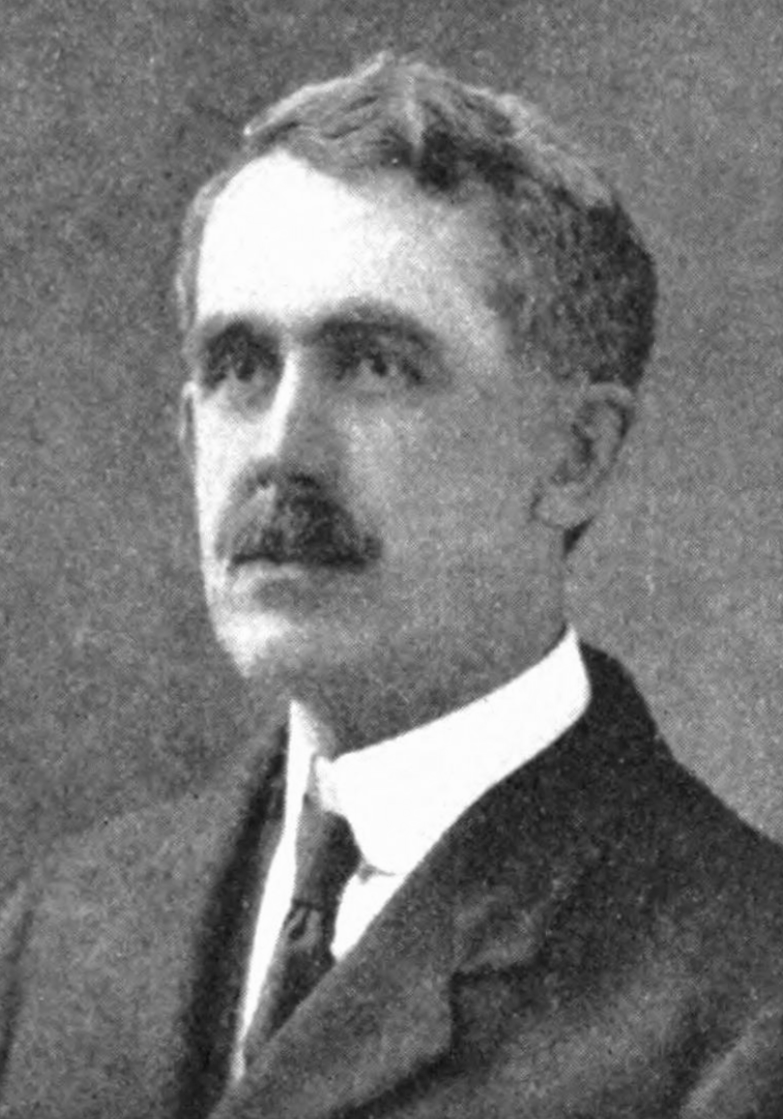
- Born: Henry Clinton Morrison; October 7, 1871; Old Town, Maine
- Died: March 19, 1945 (aged 73); Chicago, Illinois
- Education: Dartmouth College
- Occupation(s): Educator, writer

Henry Clinton Morrison (1871–1945) was the New Hampshire state superintendent of public instruction from 1904 to 1917, superintendent of University of Chicago Laboratory Schools from 1919 to 1928, professor of education, and an author.

== Biography ==
=== Early life and education ===
Morrison was born in Old Town, Maine on October 7, 1871. His father, John Morrison, married Mary Louise Ham and ran a general merchandise store. He grew up in an area characterized by the fishing and lumber industries along the East Coast of the United States. Morrison could not finance his own education, but because he showed success in his academic work, a local banker raised money and financed his education at Dartmouth College. Morrison focused on philosophy while at Dartmouth and later graduated with a Bachelor of Arts degree in 1895.

=== Career ===
Morrison entered as the teaching principal at Milford High School in New Hampshire from 1895 through 1899. He taught mathematics, Latin, history, and science but became known for his ability to deal with misbehaved students. The reputation Morrison built led to the offer to be the superintendent of schools for Portsmouth, New Hampshire, from 1899–1904. Morrison married Marion Locke and the two had three sons together.

In 1904, Morrison was promoted to New Hampshire State Superintendent of Public Instruction. He held this position for thirteen years, and during that time he examined and approved all schools throughout the state, served on the state medical board, examined teachers, and supervised attendance and child labor laws. During the year of 1908, he was elected president of the American Institute of Instruction. In 1912, the dean of the School of Education at the University of Chicago asked him to be the guest speaker for a summer session in Chicago. Morrison became great friends with the dean, Charles Hubbard Judd, which proved to be important later in Morrison's career. From 1917 to 1919 Morrison lived in Connecticut and took a position on the Connecticut State Board of Education.

After two years serving on the state board, the position of superintendent of the University of Chicago Laboratory Schools became available. Charles Judd, the dean of the college, was familiar with Morrison through their previous encounters and offered Morrison the job. Morrison moved to Chicago and held the position of superintendent of Laboratory Schools until 1928. He left the position as superintendent to become the Professor of School Administration until 1937.

Morrison is best remembered for the work and research he did at the University of Chicago. He formulated the "Morrison plan", which reorganized the style of teaching. He studied the problems with education and designed theories for approaching these problems. He believed that the student learned best by adapting or responding to a situation. Morrison configured the secondary curriculum into five types: science, appreciation, practical arts, language arts, and pure-practice. He also identified a five-step instructional pattern: pretest, teaching, testing the results of instruction, changing the instruction procedure, and teaching and testing again until the unit is mastered by the student. Morrison's landmark publication was The Practice of Teaching in Secondary Schools. This book was widely known as a way to use teaching from the 1920s to the 1940s.

Morrison retired from the University of Chicago in 1937, and died of a heart attack at his home in Chicago on March 19, 1945.
