= Margaret Ralph =

Margaret Ralph (c. 1822 – 6 March 1913) was a New Zealand landowner, businesswoman and matriarch.

== Biography ==
Born in Strabane, County Tyrone, Ireland, in approximately 1822, Margaret Ralph emigrated to New Zealand, arriving in Auckland in 1862. Following the death of her husband, Anthony Ralph, in 1872, she took over the management of their extensive landholdings in Huntly.

She became a prominent figure in the New Zealand mining industry after coal was discovered on her property. She was instrumental in the development of the Ralph's Taupiri Coal Mines, which significantly contributed to the economic growth of the Waikato region. As a matriarch and businesswoman, she managed the family's interests with notable skill until her death in Huntly on 6 March 1913.
