= Jim Blandford =

New Zealand cricketer

Personal information
- Full name: John Arthur Rawdon Blandford
- Born: 31 January 1913; Dunedin, New Zealand
- Died: 24 December 1954 (aged 41); Auckland, New Zealand
- Batting: Right-handed
- Role: Wicketkeeper-batsman

Domestic team information
- Years: Team
- 1932/33–1936/37: Wellington
- 1939/40–1940/41: Auckland

Career statistics
| Competition | First-class |
|---|---|
| Matches | 15 |
| Runs scored | 430 |
| Batting average | 20.47 |
| 100s/50s | 0/2 |
| Top score | 62 |
| Catches/stumpings | 17/12 |
- Source: ESPNcricinfo, 24 February 2022

John Arthur Rawdon "Jim" Blandford (31 January 1913 – 24 December 1954) was a New Zealand cricketer. He played first-class cricket for Auckland and Wellington between 1932 and 1941.

Blandford studied at Victoria University College in Wellington. He was a wicket-keeper and a useful lower-order batsman. He represented New Zealand in two of the four matches against the touring MCC team in 1935–36, scoring 40 and 36 in his two innings.

While serving in a Field Ambulance unit with New Zealand forces in the Middle East during World War II, Blandford contracted a severe rheumatic disease. He married Barbara Paterson McLeod in Roslyn, Dunedin, in January 1946. He died aged 41 in an Auckland hospital in December 1954, survived by his wife and two young children.
