= Peter Langloh Donkin =

- Born: 19 June 1913; Invercargill, New Zealand
- Died: 12 July 2000 (aged 87); Orange, New South Wales, Australia
- Military career
- Allegiance: United Kingdom
- Branch: Royal Air Force
- Rank: Air Commodore
- Commands: RAF Hong Kong; RAF Chivenor; No. 35 Wing RAF; No. 33 Wing RAF; No. 239 Squadron RAF; No. 4 Squadron RAF; No. 225 Squadron RAF
- Conflicts: Second World War
- Awards: Commander of the Order of the British Empire; Distinguished Service Order

Air Commodore Peter Langloh Donkin, CBE, DSO (19 June 1913 – 12 July 2000) was a New Zealand reconnaissance pilot with the Royal Air Force (RAF). He is thought to be the first western serviceman to be attacked by the Germans in the Second World War.

In February 1938, he was a flight lieutenant and a flight commander of No. 16 Squadron RAF.

Citation for Distinguished Service Order, 22 February 1944:

In recognition of gallantry and devotion to duty in operations. From a low level he took excellent photographs of a heavily defended section of the French coat [sic]. As a Commanding Officer he distinguished himself with outstanding leadership and his careful planning and discipline have enabled his squadrons to undertake sustained offensive and photographic operations with notable success.
