= Malcolm Lohrey =

New Zealand cricketer

Personal information
- Full name: Malcolm Kent Lohrey
- Born: 3 September 1913; Te Kinga, New Zealand
- Died: 18 April 1992 (aged 78); Christchurch, New Zealand
- Source: Cricinfo, 17 October 2020

Malcolm Kent Lohrey (3 September 1913 – 18 April 1992) was a New Zealand cricketer. He played in one first-class match for Canterbury in 1943/44.
