= Eleanor Smith (suffragist) =

New Zealand suffragist and magazine editor

Eleanor Phoebe Smith (née Macleod; 1828 – 19 March 1913) was a New Zealand suffragist and magazine editor. She was considered one of the pioneers of the woman suffrage movement in New Zealand.

== Early life ==
Smith was born in Bristol, England and married James Thomas Smith in 1849. The couple emigrated from England with five children in 1860 - one infant died during the voyage. The family settled in Christchurch, New Zealand and a further two children were born there. She was the mother of William Sydney Smith (1852–1929) who later changed his name to Lovell-Smith, after having married two powerful advocates of women's rights in New Zealand: Mary Jane "Jennie" Cumberworth (1848–1924) and, upon her death, Kate Sheppard (1847–1934). Two of her daughters, Lucy Masey Smith (1861–1936) and Eleanor Swaffield Smith (1863–1939), also were involved in the suffrage movement.

== Professional career and women's rights activism ==
In 1885, Smith became the editor of the magazine New Zealand Titbits. She wrote under the pen name "Vesta".

Smith joined the Women's Christian Temperance Union New Zealand when a chapter in Christchurch formed in 1885, and the Canterbury Women's Institute which formed in 1892. She was present at the first meeting of the National Council of Women in 1896 and was still a vice president of the Women's Institute at the time of her death.

She was an active member of the St Albans Methodist Church and president of the church's Ladies' Guild.

== Death ==
Smith died on 19 March 1913 at her home in the Christchurch suburb of St Albans, and she was buried in Linwood Cemetery.
