= Harry Moffatt =

Harry Louis Moffatt (1839 – 20 May 1913) was a New Zealand sailor, goldminer, storekeeper, wharfinger and writer. He was born in London, England, in 1839.
