= Norman Henderson =

New Zealand cricketer (1913–2000)

Personal information
- Full name: Norman Douglas Henderson
- Born: 13 January 1913; Dunedin, Otago, New Zealand
- Died: 30 October 2000 (aged 87); Auckland, New Zealand
- Batting: Right-handed
- Bowling: Right-arm medium-fast

Domestic team information
- Years: Team
- 1935/36: Otago
- Source: ESPNcricinfo, 14 May 2016

Norman Douglas Henderson (13 January 1913 – 30 October 2000) was a New Zealand cricketer. He played one first-class match for Otago during the 1935–36 season.

Henderson was born at Dunedin in 1913 and educated at Otago Boys' High School in the city before studying at Otago University. He played club cricket for University and played in the Otago–Canterbury varsity match whilst a student. He was awarded one of the first New Zealand cricket Blues.

After playing for Otago against Southland in November 1935, Henderson played his only first-class match the following month. He opened the bowling against Auckland in a match which was held at Eden Park over the Christmas period in. He took two wickets and scored eight runs in a heavy Otago defeat and did not play for the team again.

Professionally Henderson was an accountant. He died at Auckland in 2000 aged 87. An obituary was published in the 2002 edition of the New Zealand Cricket Almanack.
