= Evan Denham =

New Zealand surgeon and cricketer (1913–1991)

- Born: Hono Evan Horrell Denham; 18 May 1913; Brisbane, Queensland, Australia
- Died: 16 June 1991 (aged 78); Christchurch, New Zealand
- Education: Canterbury University College
- Occupation: Surgeon
- Spouse: Bunty Robertson (m. 1946)
- Cricket career

Cricket information
- Batting: Right-handed
- Bowling: Right-arm leg-spin

Domestic team information
- Years: Team
- 1945/46: Canterbury

Career statistics
Competition	FC
Matches	1
Runs scored	2
Batting average	2.00
100s/50s	0/0
Top score	2
Balls bowled	66
Wickets	1
Bowling average	28.00
5 wickets in innings	0
10 wickets in match	0
Best bowling	1/28
Catches/stumpings	0/–
- Source: Cricinfo, 21 December 2023
- Military career
- Allegiance: New Zealand
- Branch: New Zealand Medical Corps
- Service years: 1941–1945
- Rank: Captain
- Conflicts: World War II

Hono Evan Horrell Denham (18 May 1913 – 16 June 1991) was a New Zealand surgeon and cricketer. He played in one first-class match for Canterbury in 1945/46.

== Life and career ==
Denham was born in Brisbane, Australia, but brought up in Christchurch, where his father, Henry George Denham, was professor of chemistry and rector of Canterbury University College. He was educated at Christ's College, Christchurch, before studying medicine at Canterbury University College, graduating MB ChB in 1937. He worked and undertook further training in hospitals in New Zealand and England before being admitted to the Fellowship of the Royal Colleges of Surgeons in May 1941.

Denham joined the New Zealand Expeditionary Force Medical Corps in mid-1941 and served until 1945, becoming a captain and surgical specialist and serving in North Africa and Italy. He returned to Christchurch after the war, working as a surgeon in Christchurch Hospital. He remained there until 1978, specialising in thoracic surgery. He served as chairman of the New Zealand Postgraduate Medical Federation from 1966 to 1976.

A leg-spin bowler and useful lower-order batsman, Denham played one first-class match for Canterbury in the first Plunket Shield season after the war. Canterbury won, but his contribution was modest, and he was not selected again.

In Christchurch in 1946, Denham married Bunty Robertson, a Scottish nurse he had met while they were both working in Oswestry before the war. They had three daughters, all of whom became nurses, and a son, who became a farmer. Denham died in Christchurch on 16 June 1991. His wife, Bunty, died in 2008.
