= Kenneth J. McNaught =

New Zealand philatelist

Kenneth John McNaught (22 April 1913 – 17 May 1999) was a New Zealand philatelist who was added to the Roll of Distinguished Philatelists in 1978.

In the 1995 New Year Honours, he was appointed a Companion of the Queen's Service Order for community service.

McNaught was the Royal Philatelic Society London's special representative for New Zealand.
