= Helmut Rex =

Presbyterian theologian and lecturer

- Born: Helmut Herbert Hermann Rehbein; 15 February 1913; Potsdam, Brandenberg, Germany
- Died: 16 March 1967 (aged 54); Dunedin, New Zealand
- Education: University of Berlin (1931-1935), University of Otago (1948), University of Tübingen (1954)
- Spouse: Renate Jaeger
- Parents: Hermann Carl Heinrich Rehbein (father); Martha Lucie Hedwig Haupt (mother)

Helmut Herbert Hermann Rex (born Helmut Herbert Hermann Rehbein; 1913–1967) was a New Zealand Presbyterian theologian and lecturer.

== Early life ==
Helmut Rehbein was born in Potsdam, Germany, in 1913. He spent his youth in Berlin after moving there in 1919.

Rehbein married Renate Jaeger, a solicitor's daughter. Jaeger's mother was Jewish, so in order to marry they had to flee Germany separately and meet in London. Rehbein went through Switzerland. They were married in a civil ceremony on 14 February 1939 at Edmonton, London, and then in St George's Lutheran Church, Whitechapel.

Rehbein moved to New Zealand with his wife in 1939, just prior to the outbreak of war, with assistance from the Presbyterian Church. The couple changed their surname to Rex in 1946 as an effort to better integrate into their new life in New Zealand.

== Career ==
Rex started as a temporary tutor in the Theological Hall at Knox College in Dunedin, later becoming a professor there in 1953. He was dean of theology at the University of Otago for a brief period in 1963.

== Later life ==
Rex became severely ill and close to death in 1961, and again in 1965. In 1967, illness caused him to resign from his role at the University of Otago, and he died later that year.

== Works ==
The individual in Søren Kierkegaard's aesthetical writings [A thesis presented to the University of New Zealand for the degree of Master of Arts in Philosophy] (1947)

Did Jesus rise from the dead? (1967)
