= Samuel Lister (editor) =

Printer, newspaper proprietor and editor, radical

Samuel Lister (c. 1833 – 29 November 1913) was a New Zealand printer, newspaper proprietor and editor. He established the Otago Workman, a weekly newspaper that supported working-class communities and allowed Lister to express radical views on politics that were to be influential in shaping labour history in the country.

== Early life ==
Lister was born in Edinburgh, Midlothian, Scotland in either 1832 or 1833, serving an apprenticeship as a lithographic printer. He married Jane Miller in 1862 and two children were born in Scotland.

== Move to New Zealand ==
In 1865 the family sailed to New Zealand and during the voyage Lister is said to have acted as a precentor for the Presbyterians on board. This may validate the claim by one historian that he was born into a Presbyterian family. The family settled in Roslyn, later moving to the suburb of South Dunedin. The family grew in New Zealand and is registered as having eight children. It has been said that the death of his eldest son in 1875 was the likely cause of Lister drinking heavily and making a break with the church. He worked as a printer and engraver, qualified as a master in 1867 and established the Otago Workman, a weekly newspaper distributed mostly in South Dunedin.

== Activism ==
Once settled in New Zealand, Lister became an atheist, a republican and a proponent of democracy, and was said to have "kept alive the traditions of artisan radicalism and shaped them to his 'New World'."

While the Otago Workman carried local sporting news, theatre reviews, "gossip, poetry and short stories", it also attacked the authority of the clergy and royalty, holding that "government activity should be limited to (reduced) borrowing, exclusion of 'undesirable’ immigrants, a democratic education system and protection for local industries". The paper had an anonymous satirical columnist known as 'The Chiseler' who regularly mocked "those of rank and status, the monarchy [and] the titled", and while it is likely this was Lister, he did write editorials that trenchantly advocated for the industrial classes and the rights of workers.

Erik Olssen situated The Workman within a time in New Zealand history when unions began to see themselves as part of the 'working classes'. In the years leading up to 1890, the paper continued to speak for the working-class communities of Caversham and Dunedin South, but more specifically began to propound a "class view of society and politics" in the country. The paper fostered unity of the working-class, challenging stereotypical views held by "well-to-do" citizens of the unemployed as idle and attacking bi-laws claiming to "improve the habits and morals of the working class...[calling these]...class legislation". The political platform of the paper was similar to that held by most of the main unions and included supporting the breaking up of "great estates", ending the sale of Crown land, condemning sweating, consolidation of the eight-hour working day and strong recommendation for the passage of two pieces of legislation, a Workman's Lien Act and an Employers' Liability Act. Olssen's contention was that via the Otago Workman, Lister had effectively indicted New Zealand society on the grounds that "a small cohesive class exploited those who did the work".

Workingmen in Dunedin began organising themselves into unions, a Trades and Labour Council (TLC) emerged, and by 1890 it was estimated that there were around 10,000 union members in the city. Following a strike by the coal miners at Shag Point in 1890, resolved in favour of the strikers on 14 June, the police began harassing the Otago Workman, at one stage occupying the office. Lister was charged and successfully prosecuted for "publishing a certain paper to which the name and abode was not attached". In the same year, New Zealand workers got involved in the Maritime Strike which Lister described as a battle between "Capital and Labour" with the action of the workers evidence of a growing world-wide social discontent that, when mobilised, would generate "brotherhood, cooperation, and socialism". With the release of the 1890 report of the investigation into the sweating scandal, Lister strongly supported trade unionism and for labour to get organised politically.

By the time of the 1890 New Zealand general election the workers involved in unions in Dunedin were very influential in selecting candidates likely to be sympathetic to meeting their needs. While Lister was supportive of this development, he had a falling out with the Workmen's Political Committee when, along with some unions, they advocated for banning alcohol from their election meetings and promoted temperance and calls for women's suffrage - two positions that Lister was vehemently opposed to. In 1883 the Otago Workman urged that the labour politicians be defeated, but by 1896 with the bottom line of aiding the worker and providing fair wages, he had come to terms with the need for a political party and supported the Liberal Government.

== Later life and legacy ==
In 1899 one of his sons took over the paper which had been renamed the Otago Liberal and carried much less political comment. Although retired from the business, Lister maintained a high public profile on The Flat in South Dunedin until he died on 29 November 1913, twelve years after losing his wife.

Through his writings in the Otago Workman Lister has been credited with not only identifying and promoting working-class values, but also in showing Dunedin workers how their issues related to wider colonial political events in the country, helping them to forge "an ideology involving political action". A paper analysing the impact of working class consciousness in New Zealand held that the views of Lister as editor of the Otago Workman were expressed in powerful language that showed workers that issues impacting them were often caused by capitalism and needed to be opposed collectively at the political level. To this end, he helped shape a sense of working-class identity and a platform for trade unions and the labour political party.
