= Vincent McCarten =

New Zealand cricketer

Vincent Dennehy Aloysius McCarten (9 April 1913 – 28 July 1993) was a New Zealand cricketer. A right-handed batsman, he played a single first-class cricket|first-class match for Otago during the 1944–45 season.

McCarten was born at Dunedin in 1913. He served in the New Zealand military, including during World War II, and played some cricket during his service career, appearing in a January 1945 wartime match at the Basin Reserve and in a 1948 match for a Combined Services team at Eden Park. Hie only first-class appearance came for Otago in December 1944 against Canterbury. He scored a total of three runs in the match.

McCarten died at Christchurch in 1993 at the age of 80. An obituary was published in the 1995 edition of the New Zealand Cricket Almanack.
