= Henry Morrison (cricketer) =

Scottish-born New Zealand cricketer

Henry Bannerman Morrison (20 September 1850 – 10 November 1913) was a Scottish-born cricketer who played in New Zealand for Otago during the 1880–81 season. He was born at Glasgow in 1850.

A batsman and medium-pace bowler, Henry Morrison played for Southland against the English touring team in March 1877, winning the prize for the best fieldsman in the match. A year later, against the Australian touring team, he took six wickets for 87 runs. He later made a single first-class appearance for Otago, during the 1880–81 season, against Canterbury. From the lower-middle order, he scored 17 runs in the first innings in which he batted, and a duck in the second, as Otago lost the match by an innings.

Morrison was a farmer by trade. He died in England at Burgess Hill in Sussex in 1913, aged 63.
