= Ranfurly Shield 1930–1939 =

The Ranfurly Shield, colloquially known as the Log o' Wood, is perhaps the most prestigious trophy in New Zealand's domestic rugby union competition. First played for in 1904, the Ranfurly Shield is based on a challenge system, rather than a league or knockout competition as with most football trophies. The holding union must defend the Shield in challenge matches, and if a challenger defeats them, they become the new holder of the Shield.

== Holders ==
Six different unions held the Ranfurly Shield between 1930 and 1939.

Union	Won	Successful defences
Southland	Held at beginning of decade	3
Wellington	3 September 1930	1
Canterbury	22 August 1931	15
Hawke's Bay	21 July 1934	2
Auckland	8 September 1934	1
Canterbury	10 August 1935	4
Otago	21 September 1935	8
Southland	31 July 1937	0
Otago	30 July 1938	5
Southland	10 September 1938	6

== Fixtures ==
=== 1930 ===
26 July 1930

Southland	19–0	Wanganui
Try: Bert Geddes (2), Thomas Metcalfe, Joseph Bell, G. Porter; Con: Charlie Diack (2)

Rugby Park Stadium, Invercargill
Referee: J.L. Oughton (Southland)

6 August 1930

Southland	37–5	Otago
Try: Bert Geddes (3), R.G. Webb (2). Charlie Diack, W.H. Southern, Hunter McKenzie, C.T. George; Con: Charlie Diack (5)		Try: David Lindsay; Con: David Lindsay

Rugby Park Stadium, Invercargill
Referee: R.J.G. Collins (Canterbury)

16 August 1930

Southland	9–6	Hawke's Bay
Pen: Charlie Diack (3)		Try: Cyril Brownlie; Pen: Bert Grenside

Rugby Park Stadium, Invercargill
Referee: Alan Fleury (Otago)

3 September 1930

Southland	3–12	Wellington
Try: R.G. Webb		Try: Don Oliver (2), Hubert McLean, James Mackay

Rugby Park Stadium, Invercargill
Referee: Alan Fleury (Otago)

=== 1931 ===
22 July 1931

Wellington	36–13	Southland
Try: Nelson Ball (2), E.F. Barry (2), Herb Lilburne (2), Hubert McLean, Angus Macdonald; Con: Frank Kilby (3)		Try: D.U. Crosbie, Bert Geddes, D.G. Grant; Con: G. Porter (2)

Athletic Park, Wellington
Referee: Alan Fleury (Otago)

22 August 1931

Wellington	6–9	Canterbury
Try: W.J. Huxtable, O.M. Price		Try: Gordon Innes, G.D. Day; Con: A.W. Roberts

Athletic Park, Wellington
Referee: Joseph King (Taranaki)

12 September 1931

Canterbury	17–6	Otago
Try: W.J. Brown, R. Hazelhurst, Gordon Innes, W. Sweeney, N.A. Dunshea; Con: A.W. Roberts		Try: Jack Robilliard; Pen: Robert Souter

Lancaster Park Oval, Christchurch
Referee: Henry Leith (Wellington)

=== 1932 ===
13 August 1932

Canterbury	11–5	South Canterbury
Try: Alan Andrews (2), Charlie Oliver; Con: A.W. Roberts		Try: I.M. Caird; Con: A.F. Gaffaney

Lancaster Park Oval, Christchurch
Referee: Joseph E. Moffitt (Wellington)

20 August 1932

Canterbury	14–0	Auckland
Try: George Hart, W.J. Brown, A.N. Boutrey; Con: A.W. Roberts; Pen: A.W. Roberts

Lancaster Park Oval, Christchurch
Referee: Samuel Hollander (Canterbury)

27 August 1932

Canterbury	5–3	West Coast
Try: Anthony Cottrell; Con: A.W. Roberts		Try: L.T. Martyn

Lancaster Park Oval, Christchurch
Referee: Ernie A. Empson (Canterbury)

3 September 1932

Canterbury	9–8	Wellington
Try: Anthony Cottrell, A.N. Boutrey, R.K. King		Try: C.E. Robins, Angus Macdonald; Con: J.R. Lamason

Lancaster Park Oval, Christchurch
Referee: Thomas McIntosh (West Coast)

10 September 1932

Canterbury	13–0	Buller
Try: R.K. King (2), W.J. Brown; Drop: A.W. Roberts

Lancaster Park Oval, Christchurch
Referee: Ernie A. Empson (Canterbury)

24 September 1932

Canterbury	17–6	Waikato
Try: Jack Manchester, A.R. Bowes, W.J. Brown; Con: A.W. Roberts; Pen: A.W. Roberts (2)		Try: T. Thomson, G. Parker

Lancaster Park Oval, Christchurch
Referee: Ernie A. Empson (Canterbury)

=== 1933 ===
2 August 1933

Canterbury	31–7	Ashburton County
Try: N.A. Dunshea (2), Charlie Oliver (2), J. Hattersley (2); Keith Mortlock; Con: N.A. Dunshea (2); Pen: R. Hazelhurst		Pen: I.L. Behrnes; Drop: A. Bradford

Lancaster Park Oval, Christchurch
Attendance: 6,000
Referee: C.G. Crawford (Canterbury)

19 August 1933

Canterbury	21–3	Southland
Try: Alan Andrews, G.J. Howell, Charlie Oliver, George Hart, Jack Manchester; Con: G.T. Noland (3)		Try: A. McKay

Lancaster Park Oval, Christchurch
Attendance: 25,000
Referee: Joseph E. Moffitt (Wellington)

26 August 1933

Canterbury	8–5	Otago
Try: George Hart, Keith Mortlock; Con: G.T. Nolan		Try: H. McSkimming; Con: H. McSkimming

Lancaster Park Oval, Christchurch
Referee: Herbert McKenzie (Wairarapa)

2 September 1933

Canterbury	23–14	West Coast
Try: R. Hazelhurst (2), R.K. King, Anthony Cottrell, J. Hattersley; Con: R. Hazelhurst (4)		Try: R.B. Scandrett, Ronald King; Con: L.T. Martyn; Pen: L.T. Martyn (2)

Lancaster Park Oval, Christchurch
Referee: A. Thompson (Canterbury)

9 September 1933

Canterbury	13–3	Buller
Try: R.K. King, Alan Andrews, A.R. Bowes; Con: F.T.J. French (2)		Pen: E.C. Holder

Lancaster Park Oval, Christchurch
Referee: Ernie A. Empson (Canterbury)

16 September 1933

Canterbury	15–15	Taranaki
Try: Alan Andrews, F.T.J. French; Con: F.T.J. French; Pen: F.T.J. French; Drop: R. Hazelhurst		Try: Kenneth Fookes, Clifford Wills, J. Ross; Con: J. Ross; Drop: Arthur Collins

Lancaster Park Oval, Christchurch
Referee: C.G. Crawford (Canterbury)

23 September 1933

Canterbury	6–3	South Canterbury
Try: Keith Mortlock; Pen: F.T.J. French		Try: John Boys

Lancaster Park Oval, Christchurch
Referee: Ernie A. Empson (Canterbury)

30 September 1933

Canterbury	36–0	King Country
Try: N.A. Dunshea (2), Jack Manchester (2), Charlie Oliver (2), W.J. Brown, Alan Andrews; Con: F.T.J. French (2), Jack Manchester, Charlie Oliver; Drop: Alf Cobden

Lancaster Park Oval, Christchurch
Referee: Ernie A. Empson (Canterbury)

=== 1934 ===
21 July 1934

Canterbury	0–9	Hawke's Bay
		Try: Bill Collins, Charles Smith, Eddy Apsey

Lancaster Park Oval, Christchurch
Referee: Samuel Hollander (Canterbury)

16 August 1934

Hawke's Bay	39–16	Wanganui
Try: Eddy Apsey (3), Charles Smith (2), T.W.D. Ireland, H.L. Bradley, J.G. Gunn, C.H. Rolls, Colin Le Quesne, W.M. Miller; Con: H.W. Sheriffs (3)		Try: George Thakambau, I.A. McIntyre, T.C. Chase, J.C. Buckley; Con: T.C. Chase (2)

McLean Park, Napier
Attendance: 4,000
Referee: E.D. Berry (Hawke's Bay)

1 September 1934

Hawke's Bay	23–8	Taranaki
Try: Dick Steere (2), Charles Smith, C.H. Rolls, H.L. Bradley, Tori Reid, C.E. Evans; Con: C.E. Evans		Try: L.H. Edwards; Con: Arthur Collins; Pen: Arthur Collins

McLean Park, Napier
Referee: Albert de Clifton (Wellington)

8 September 1934

Hawke's Bay	14–18	Auckland
Try: Tori Reid, C.H. Rolls, Charles Smith; Con: H.L. Bradley; Drop: Colin Le Quesne		Try: Harcourt Caughey, E.J. Hedge, Ronald Bush; Con: Leo Heazlewood (3); Pen: Leo Heazlewood

McLean Park, Napier
Attendance: 9,000
Referee: R.J. Paton (Wellington)

=== 1935 ===
3 July 1935

Auckland	29–8	North Auckland
Try: Frank Solomon (2), David Solomon, Henry Brown, A.H. Brown, Hubert McLean, R. Currey; Con: Ronald Bush (4)		Try: L.C. Cooney; Con: S.R. Pickering; Pen: S.R. Pickering

Eden Park, Auckland
Referee: A.E. Austin (Auckland)

10 August 1935

Auckland	13–16	Canterbury
Try: R.K. Anderson; Pen: Ronald Bush (2); Drop: Ronald Bush		Try: J.G. Rankin, Horace Deavoll, Geoff Parsons, G.W. Thompson; Con: Horace Deavoll (2)

Eden Park, Auckland
Attendance: 10,000
Referee: C.F. Paull (Auckland)

24 August 1935

Canterbury	27–16	Wairarapa
Try: Clement McPhail (2), J.G. Polson (2), R.R.M. Innes, W. Sweeney, J.G. Rankin; Con: Horace Deavoll (3)		Try: M.W. Devine, P. Ward, H.L. de C. Martelli; Con: Frederick Fuller (2); Pen: Frederick Fuller

Lancaster Park Oval, Christchurch
Referee: A. Thompson (Canterbury)

31 August 1935

Canterbury	8–3	Southland
Try: N.A. Dunshea, J.G. Rankin; Con: Horace Deavoll		Try: H.W. Southern

Lancaster Park Oval, Christchurch
Referee: R.W. Blazey (Canterbury)

7 September 1935

Canterbury	16–11	West Coast
Try: J.G. Rankin (2), Clement McPhail, R.R.M. Innes; Con: Horace Deavoll (2)		Try: E. Pfahlert, W. Mann, C. Schroder; Con: W.H. Vincent

Lancaster Park Oval, Christchurch
Referee: Ernie A. Empson (Canterbury)

14 September 1935

Canterbury	12–11	South Canterbury
Try: R. Brown, J.O. Hattersley; Pen: Horace Deavoll		Try: Gordon King, J.T. Strang; Con: L.T. Martyn; Pen: L.T. Martyn

Lancaster Park Oval, Christchurch
Referee: R.W. Blazey (Canterbury)

21 September 1935

Canterbury	6–15	Otago
Pen: Horace Deavoll, J.J. McAuliffe		Try: Jim Watt, F.J. Green, Charles Quaid; Con: David Trevathan; Drop: David Trevathan

Lancaster Park Oval, Christchurch
Attendance: 17,000
Referee: Ernie A. Empson (Canterbury)

=== 1936 ===
1 August 1936

Otago	16–3	Southland
Try: Jim Watt (2); Pen: David Trevathan (2); Drop: David Trevathan		Try: Johnny Purdue

Carisbrook, Dunedin
Attendance: 26,000
Referee: Leonard Morton Wright (Otago)

5 August 1936

Otago	14–5	Auckland
Try: A.E. Valentine, Colin Gillies; Con: David Trevathan; Pen: David Trevathan (2)		Try: A.H. Brown; Con: Ronald Bush

Carisbrook, Dunedin
Attendance: 28,000
Referee: Lyndon Macassey (Otago)

12 August 1936

Otago	11–5	Manawatu
Try: Jim Watt; Con: Jack Taylor; Pen: Jack Taylor (2)		Try: R.M. Gillespie; Con: W.G. Powell

Carisbrook, Dunedin
Attendance: 8,000
Referee: Leonard Morton Wright (Otago)

26 August 1936

Otago	26–3	South Canterbury
Try: John Hore (2), David Trevathan, Jim Watt; Con: David Trevathan (3); Drop: David Trevathan (2)		Pen: Tom Morrison

Carisbrook, Dunedin
Referee: Samuel Hollander (Canterbury)

29 August 1936

Otago	16–0	Canterbury
Try: Frederick Vorrath, Bill Laney, Harold Simon; Con: David Trevathan (2); Pen: David Trevathan

Carisbrook, Dunedin
Referee: N.D. Tilley (Otago)

5 September 1936

Otago	30–0	North Auckland
Try: T.G. Gold (2), Bill Laney, Harold Simon, R. McSkimming; Con: David Trevathan (4); Drop: David Trevathan

Carisbrook, Dunedin
Referee: N. Reardon (Otago)

19 September 1936

Otago	16–3	Wellington
Try: Jim Watt, David Trevathan, Harold Fookes; Con: David Trevathan (2); Pen: David Trevathan		Try: E.R. Nees

Carisbrook, Dunedin
Referee: Samuel Hollander (Canterbury)

26 September 1936

Otago	30–0	West Coast
Try: W.A. Black (4), Jim Watt, Harold Simon; Con: David Trevathan (2); Drop: David Trevathan, Jack Taylor

Carisbrook, Dunedin
Referee: Leonard Morton Wright (Otago)

=== 1937 ===
31 July 1937

Otago	7–12	Southland
Try: Frederick Vorrath; Drop: David Trevathan		Try: Arthur Wesney; Con: Arthur Wesney; Pen: Arthur Wesney; Drop: Alexander Sutherland

Carisbrook, Dunedin
Attendance: 35,000
Referee: N.D. Tilley (Otago)

=== 1938 ===
30 July 1938

Southland	6–7	Otago
Pen: R. Barnett (2)		Try: W.A. Black; Drop: David Trevathan

Rugby Park Stadium, Invercargill
Attendance: 16,000
Referee: C.C. Kenward (Southland)

10 August 1938

Otago	16–7	Canterbury
Try: S. McCartney, Frederick Vorrath; Pen: W.I. Perriam, David Trevathan; Drop: David Trevathan		Pen: D.P. White; Drop: D.P. White

Carisbrook, Dunedin
Attendance: 10,000
Referee: Lyndon Macassey (Otago)

24 August 1938

Otago	27–16	South Canterbury
Try: W.S. McLelland, A.A. Parkhill, Jack Taylor; Con: David Trevathan, J.R. Taylor; Pen: Jack Taylor (2); Drop: David Trevathan (2)		Pen: Tom Morrison (4); Drop: Tom Morrison

Carisbrook, Dunedin
Attendance: 10,000
Referee: D. MacKay (Otago)

27 August 1938

Otago	12–0	North Otago
Try: S. McCartney (2), G.R. McDonald; Pen: Jack Taylor

Carisbrook, Dunedin
Referee: J.M. Briggs (Otago)

31 August 1938

Otago	4–0	Hawke's Bay
Drop: David Trevathan

Carisbrook, Dunedin
Attendance: 22,000
Referee: Ernie A. Empson (Canterbury)

3 September 1938

Otago	24–3	Taranaki
Try: L. Werner (3); Con: Jack Taylor; Pen: Jack Taylor (3); Drop: David Trevathan		Pen: J.L. Mueli

Carisbrook, Dunedin
Attendance: 6,000
Referee: J.M. Briggs (Otago)

10 September 1938

Otago	5–10	Southland
Try: W.A. Black; Con: Jack Taylor		Try: G.H. Graham, M.P. Grace; Con: J.M. Ballantyne (2)

Carisbrook, Dunedin
Attendance: 28,000
Referee: J.B. Burton (Otago)

14 September 1938

Southland	10–3	Wellington
Try: M.P. Grace, Alexander Sutherland; Drop: M.P. Grace		Try: J.P. Eastwood

Rugby Park Stadium, Invercargill
Attendance: 7,000
Referee: J.B. Burton (Otago)

24 September 1938

Southland	20–16	Ashburton County
Try: Doug Herron (2), Thomas Metcalfe, G.H. Graham; Con: Doug Herron; Pen: Doug Herron, M.P. Grace		Try: D.G. Brooker, R.B. Lilley, P.C. Bradley; Con: I.L. Behrnes (2); Pen: I.L. Behrnes

Rugby Park Stadium, Invercargill
Referee: W.O. Ward (Southland)

=== 1939 ===
5 September 1939

Southland	23–4	Otago
Try: Ron Ward (2), Charles Saxton, Johnny Purdue; Con: Arthur Wesney; Pen: Arthur Wesney (3)		Drop: David Trevathan

Rugby Park Stadium, Invercargill
Attendance: 18,000
Referee: R.W. Murray (Southland)

12 August 1939

Southland	17–3	Manawatu
Try: Alexander Sutherland (2), Charles Saxton, Ron Ward; Con: Arthur Wesney; Pen: Ron Ward		Pen: Jack Finlay

Rugby Park Stadium, Invercargill
Attendance: 4,500
Referee: Ivan H. Dillon (Southland)

16 August 1939

Southland	38–0	Bush
Try: R.P. Gibb (3), Ray Mahony (3), Charles Saxton, Alexander Sutherland, Ron Ward, G.H. Graham; Con: J.W. Fleming (3), F.H. McEwan

Rugby Park Stadium, Invercargill
Referee: R.W. Murray (Southland)

26 August 1939

Southland	50–0	Ashburton County
Try: Alexander Sutherland (4), Johnny Purdue (2), Syd Purdue, Ron Ward, Charles Saxton, Arthur Wesney, Ray Mahony; Con: Arthur Wesney (7); Pen: Arthur Wesney

Rugby Park Stadium, Invercargill
Attendance: 9,000
Referee: E.J. Barron (Southland)
