= Richard Steere =

Richard Steere may refer to:

- Richard Steere (fencer) (1909–2001), American Olympic fencer
- Richard Steere (author) (1643–1721), colonial American merchant and poet

== See also ==
- Dick Steere, American football player
- Dick Steere (rugby union), New Zealand rugby union player
