= Cameron Turner =

Cameron Turner may refer to:

- Cameron Turner (American football)
- Cameron Turner (RNZAF officer)
