= Wilf Hassan =

New Zealand international rugby league footballer

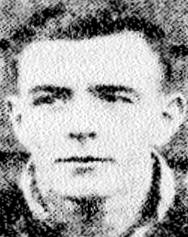

Personal information
- Full name: Wilfred Thomson Hassan
- Born: 9 February 1910 Wingate, Durham, England
- Died: 10 September 1967 (aged 57) Gisborne, New Zealand

Playing information
- Weight: 11 st 7 lb (73 kg)

Rugby league
- Position: Halfback, Stand-off
Club
Years	Team	Pld	T	G	FG	P
1928–34	Marist Old Boys	94	18	1	0	56
1931	Marist-Devonport	1	0	0	0	0
1935–37	Mount Albert	24	3	0	0	9
	Total	119	21	1	0	65
Representative
Years	Team	Pld	T	G	FG	P
1930–35	Auckland	9	1	0	0	3
1931	North Island	1	0	0	0	0
1931	Auckland Colts	1	1	0	0	3
1932	New Zealand Trials	2	0	0	0	0
1932	New Zealand	1	0	0	0	0
1932	New Zealand XIII	1	0	0	0	0
1935	Auckland B	1	0	0	0	0

Rugby union
Club
Years	Team	Pld	T	G	FG	P
1934	Marist (Auckland)	4	3	0	0	9
1934	Marist (Hamilton)	2	1	0	0	3
	Total	6	4	0	0	12
Representative
Years	Team	Pld	T	G	FG	P
1934	Hamilton (rep)	2	1	0	0	3

Wilfred Thomson Hassan (9 February 1910 – 10 September 1967) was a rugby league footballer who represented New Zealand in 1932 in a test match against England thus becoming Kiwi #221. He was also a champion diver and was Auckland diving champion on several occasions and New Zealand champion in 1934 and 1935.

== Early life ==
Wilfred was born on 9 February 1910 in Wingate, Durham, England, the son of Patrick Columkill (Colin) Hassan, who was born in Glasgow, Scotland in 1886. Wilfred died on 10 September 1967, according to New Zealand Births, Deaths and Marriages. His father, Colin, had a number of occupations including iron roller (Glasgow), Canadian soldier (WW1), painter (Sydney Nova Scotia), mechanic and bricklayer (Auckland NZ). Wilfred was raised by his grandparents, Jane Kingswell and John Thomas Hassan with financial support from his father. The Hassan name originated in Ireland from where Wilfred's great great grandparents had migrated to England around 1838. In 1911 when he was aged 1 the England/Wales census recorded him as living at 19 Burleigh Street, South Shields, Durham, England. At some point in 1911 he moved with his family to Canada. In the 1911 Canadian census their residence in June was recorded as "Dominion No 6 Polling District No 11, Cape Breton South, Nova Scotia, Canada". In 1921, Wilfred moved to New Zealand with his grandmother, Jane Hassan, arriving in Auckland on board the Niagara on 28 May 1921, from Vancouver. Also on board were some of Wilfred's young uncles.

=== Education and high school sports ===
Wilfred Hassan was educated at Sacred Heart College on Richmond Road in Ponsonby (before it later relocated to Glendowie in 1955). He was heavily involved in sports while at the school, placing highly in athletic events such as running, long jump and shot put, while also boxing successfully as a welterweight. He also played halfback for the first fifteen rugby union team in his final two years. In his final year at Sacred Heart in 1927 he scored a try in a 6–4 win against Mount Albert Grammar School. The match was played on Eden Park as part of the annual ‘Schools Day’ where 8,000 spectators were present.

== Rugby league playing career ==
=== Marist Old Boys rugby league ===
At the start of the 1928 season Hassan joined the catholic Marist Old Boys rugby league club. He debuted in their first match of the season in the halfback position where he was to spend the majority of his career. His first match was against Devonport United at Carlaw Park before a crowd of 10,000 on a benefit match day for Richard Stack. It was reported that Hassan "was clearly concerned by the big crowd, and although his handling was weak, his tackling was particularly effective". In his championship debut on 5 May against Richmond Rovers he was said to have played well. The New Zealand Herald wrote that "the player who caught the eye was the youthful Hassan. On his form on Saturday he should have a career in front of him as a footballer. He was here, there and everywhere, being prominent both on attack and defence". His first ever try for Marist came in an 18–14 win over Ponsonby in round 4. He scored the final try of the match 3 minutes before the finish after "he beat the opposition in a brilliant run to score between the posts" after "racing hard from a bad position". The New Zealand Herald said that regarding tackling Hassan "was the shining star, his hard, low tackled being a treat to witness. His effort which stopped Hutt right on the line when a try looked certain was a brilliant one". His final match of the season came in the Stormont Shield final win over Devonport by 9 to 8. He finished the season having played 14 matches and scoring the 1 try.

In 1929 he again started the season at halfback for Marist. He played 20 matches for them and scored 4 tries. They could only manage a mid table finish in the championship but were victorious in the Roope Rooster knockout competition and the Stormont Shield champion of champions final. Following their semi final Roope Rooster win over City Rovers it was said of Hassan that he "served his backs well. This Sacred Heart College old boy is a clever little player". In the final against Ponsonby United he scored a try in a 17–9 win. He set up a try for Clarke before later scoring the "finest try of the match" which sealed the victory. He also played in the 28–14 win over Stormont Shield final. Hassan's final 2 matches of the season were for Marist against the touring South Sydney. They scored an upset 10–9 win in the first match at Carlaw Park before a crowd of 15,000. A week later however they were defeated 21–5, again before a crowd of 15,000. Auckland played 2 matches during the season but Hassan was unable to break into the side with current New Zealand players Frank Delgrosso, Tim Peckham, Stan Prentice and Allan Seagar all ahead of him in the halfback and standoff positions.

=== Auckland representative debut ===
In 1930 Hassan played 13 games for Marist, scoring 3 tries. His tries all came in the first six matches of the season and his form was good enough to be named as an emergency player for the New Zealand Possibles v Probables match on 14 June. The match was a trial played as curtain-raiser to the North Island v South Island match, however Hassan was not required to play. He was selected again as an emergency player, this time however for Auckland in their 23 August match with the New Zealand side who were returning from their tour of Australia. Riley and Brady had to leave the field injured early and Hassan took the latter's place to make his Auckland debut. It was said that he "proved his worth. He "sent Ruby in for an unconverted try" and then scored himself towards the end of the match which was won by the New Zealand side 34–27.

=== North Island appearance ===
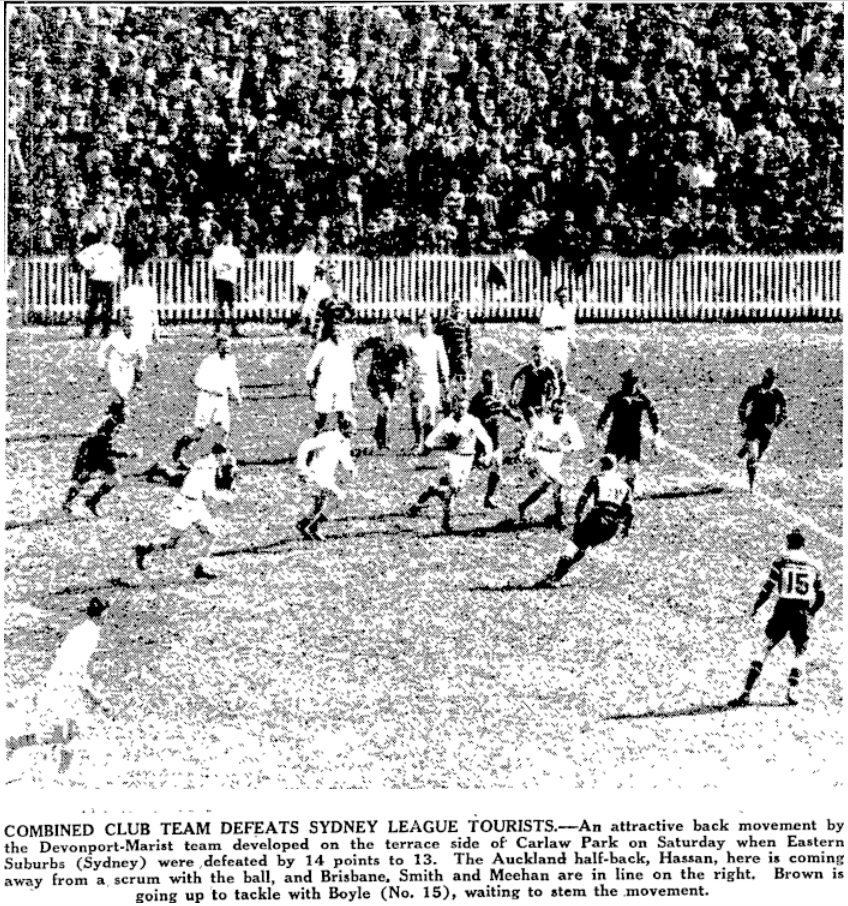

The 1931 season saw Hassan play 16 times for Marist and he scored 2 tries. Notably the team won the championship for the first time since 1924. It took until the final round for them to secure the title when they defeated Devonport United 12-5 who finished just 2 points behind them. Hassan was then picked for the North Island side to play the South Island in their annual fixture. He was picked at halfback with Hec Brisbane captaining the side at standoff. The North Island won the match easily on 15 August by 52 points to 23. It was reported that he "justified his selection as half, and, besides showing up for several fine dashes from the base of the scrum, combined sweetly with his club mate, Brisbane. They totally outplayed their opposing halves, Johnny Dodds, and McKewen and "it was a simple matter for Brisbane and Hassan to beat the visitors’ five eighths" while he also "over-shadowed Masters" who was the South Island halfback.

On 26 June he made his second appearance for Auckland in their match with Northland at Carlaw Park. The visitors surprised the Auckland side with the match drawn 19-19. It was said that W. Shortland, the Northland halfback was "superior to Hassan behind the scrum". The following weekend he was part of the Marist side who lost the Stormont Shield final to Devonport by 25 to 6.

In October the Eastern Suburbs side from Sydney toured New Zealand. Hassan was picked in a combined Marist-Devonport side to play them on 17 October. The defeated the Sydney side by 14 points to 13. He then was chosen for an Auckland Colts side to play the same opponents 4 days later on 21 October. He scored the first try of the match after taking a pass from Oliff and he "cut in cleverly to score".

=== New Zealand appearance ===
At the start of the 1932 season it was reported that Hassan had moved to Cambridge. However efforts were being made to have him return to Auckland for games by the Marist club. Then on 12 May it was reported that he was trying to be reinstated back into rugby league which indicates that he may have registered to play rugby union to begin the season. On 27 May he was indeed reinstated officially by the New Zealand Council. He began playing for Marist again in round 2 on 14 May and finished the season playing 10 matches for them scoring 2 tries and kicking a conversion. In a 4 June match for Marist against Newton Rangers it was stated that he "was injured five times, [and] had to be assisted from the field". Then following their round 8 match with Ponsonby it was reported in the New Zealand Herald that "few players in the code have been so unfortunate with regard to injuries as Hassan. The Marist half this season has been hurt in almost every game. Against Ponsonby on Saturday Hassan hurt his shoulder and later retired with a sprained ankle".

Then on 11 July he was selected to play in an Auckland Possibles trial side against the Probables. It was part of a series of trial matches to assist the New Zealand selectors in choosing their test side to play England. His Possibles side lost the match 26–12. He was then chosen for the Probables side to play the Possibles a week later on 23 July. His side again lost 37–15. Following these trial matches he was picked in an Auckland training squad to prepare for their match with England. He was then selected to play in the halfback position against the tourists with Hec Brisbane outside him at standoff.

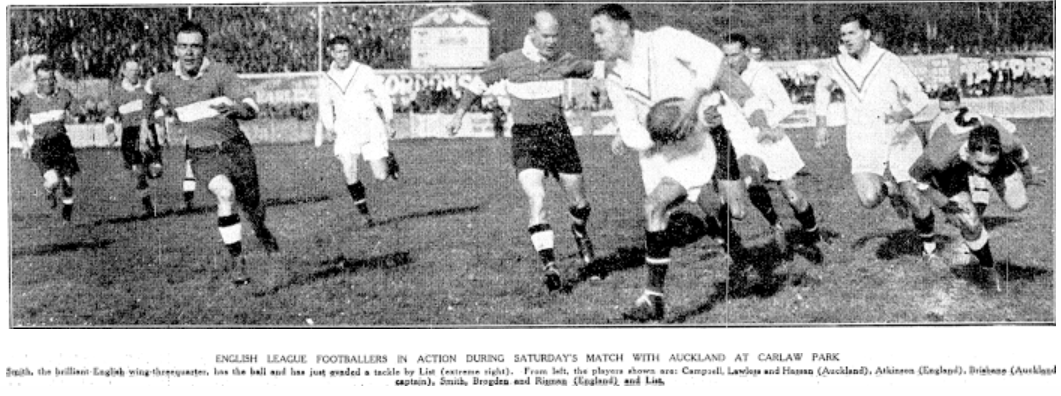

It was thought that "the inclusion of Hassan at halfback and Davidson at centre is likely to speed up the attack. Hassan is a clever player round the scrum and should combine effectively with Brisbane and Cooke".

The match was played on 6 August at Carlaw Park before a crowd of 15,000. Auckland played well but were defeated 19–14. Hassan was said to have justified his selection "behind the pack". He "was in his best form behind the scrum, getting the ball away well and being conspicuous for good defence".

After the first test at Carlaw Park 12 Auckland players were chosen to travel to Christchurch to prepare for the second test with Hassan amongst them. The Herald said that "any doubts as to Hassan’s ability must have been well cleared by his play round the scrum against the Englishmen on Saturday. He is easily the best halfback playing the code, and it will cause surprise if he is omitted from the next test team".

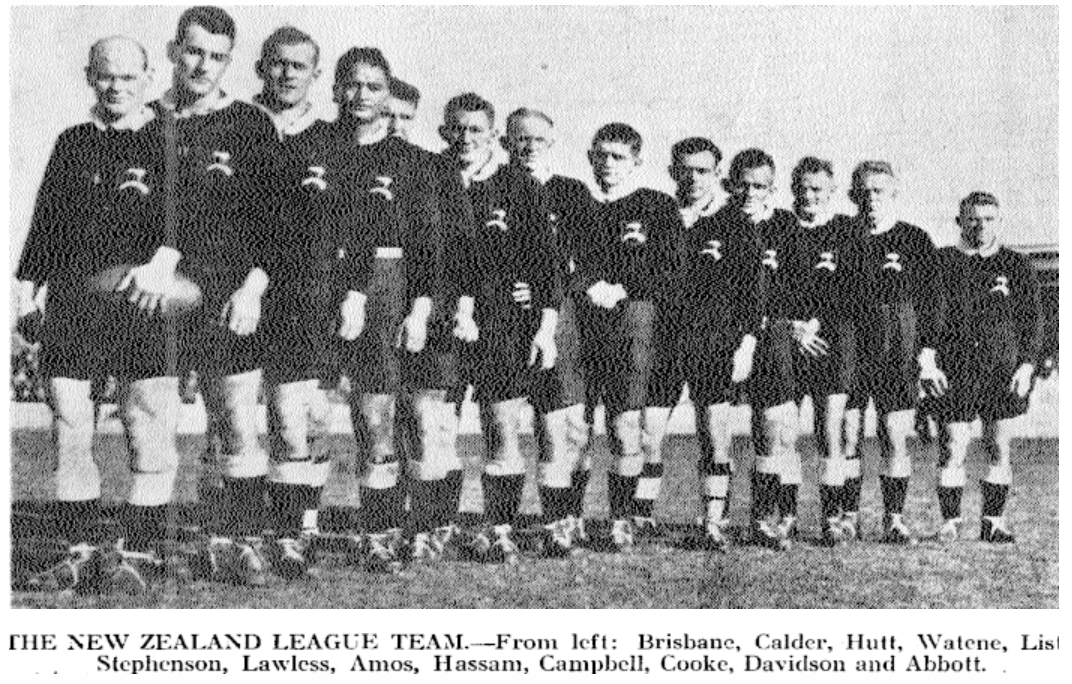

Hassan was indeed selected to make his New Zealand debut however he was picked in the standoff position which caused some surprise as it was a position that he had spent relatively little time in. New Zealand were defeated 25 to 14 in the match played in Christchurch. Edwin Abbot was picked to play at halfback. During the first half he "secured, made ground and passed to Hassan, [who] swung outwards, drew Jim Sullivan and gave a well timed pass to List, who clapped on the pace and dived across as he was tackled by Gus Risman. During the second half the backline was shuffled with Brisbane moving into standoff while Hassan was moved into the centres. The match was then characterised by some rough play with a few incidents including one where Hassan "received rough handling at the hands of Martin Hodgson, and play was held up while he was given attention". The Herald said that "Hassan is purely a halfback, and if considered not good enough for this position he should have been dropped. By his play for Auckland against England he fully deserved a place behind the scrum in the test match. Hassan and Brisbane play together in club football, a point which should have carried weight with the selectors.

Hassan was then chosen to play in a New Zealand XIII to play England in Wellington. The New Zealand XIII were completely outclassed by England who won 59 to 8. Captain Lou Hutt broke a thumb early in the match and the New Zealand side was forced to play with 12 players for the remainder of the match.

Two weeks later on 3 September Hassan was back playing for Marist in the semi-final Roope Rooster win over Devonport. A week later he was part of the Marist side which won the Roope Rooster final 28–8 over City Rovers. Marist then played Devonport in the Stormont Shield final however Hassan was unable to play as he had a poisoned finger. His final game of the season was for Marist against an Auckland XIII which was a fundraiser to assist Trevor Hanlon (a former Marist player) in returning home from England where he had been playing. Hassan scored a try and kicked the only conversion of his senior playing career.

=== Marist and Auckland ===
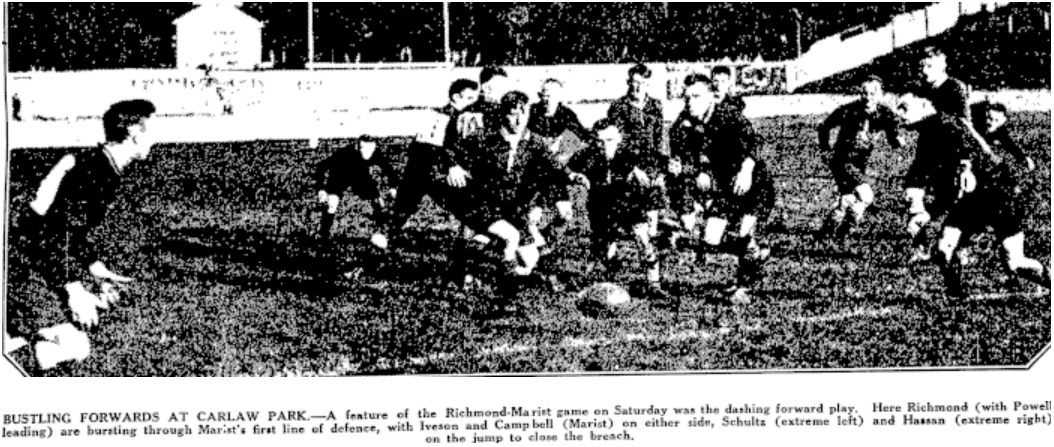
Hassan on the right in line with the ball in a match for Marist against Richmond.

The 1933 season saw Hassan again turning out for Marist in his 6th season with them. On 1 April he broke 2 small bones in his hand in a practice game at Carlaw Park. He was taken to Auckland Hospital and it was predicted that he would be unavailable for several weeks. It was reported that he was recovering well and would probably be available for their second round match however he was fit enough to play in round 1 though he played at fullback. He went on to play 16 matches for Marist, scoring 3 tries. On 30 September he played for them against the touring St. George side. Marist won 25–11 with Hassan scoring a try before 11,000 spectators. He had made a "brilliant run through the opposition and repeated his effort a while later to score a fine solo try". Hassan played 4 matches for Auckland in 1933.

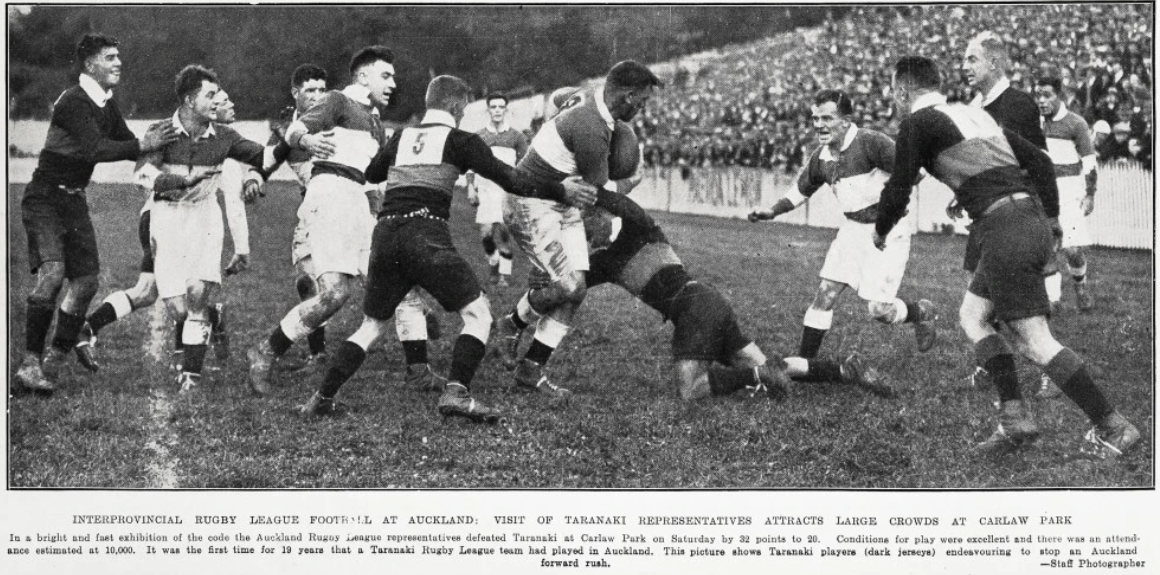
Hassan in the background during the match against Taranaki on June 10.

The first was against Taranaki on 10 June with Auckland winning 32–20. Hassan was named as captain for the match. The Taranaki forwards kept play tight and "gave the local half [Hassan] no peace" and "few chances". he was however said to have "played a fine game at half, his defence work frequently saving the Auckland team".

Then on 15 July he was part of the Auckland side which lost to South Auckland 14–0 in a match for the Northern Union Challenge Cup. He "was called upon to perform a prodigious task. When he did appear to have a chance, his breakaway, McLaughlin, was invariably in the way". He made several attacking efforts but several chances were spilled by his teammates.

He was listed in the reserves for Auckland's match against North Auckland on 5 August but did not take the field. Then later in the season he played on consecutive weekends for Auckland against Hawke's Bay and South Auckland. On 2 September Auckland had a comfortable win over Hawke's Bay at Carlaw Park by 47 points to 17. The following weekend they defeated South Auckland 17–5. He "came out of a trying ordeal behind the scrum with credit".

=== Switch to rugby union (Marist RFC) ===
In 1934 Hassan was elected to the Marist Old Boys executive committee on 22 March. He was however only to play 5 matches for them, scoring 1 try. Then on 7 June it was reported that he had applied to be reinstated into the rugby union code. At the same time it was reported that several senior Marist players were in disagreement with the club over with eight refusing to play. The players concerned including Hassan, along with Charles Dunne, Des Herring, Gordon Campbell, the 3 Schultz brothers (Len, Bill and John), and Claude List. An official statement from the club committee said "that several committee members and some players were dissatisfied on a point of club finance, whether portion of expenditure should apply to senior players alone or be devoted to general club services, including juniors. It was found legally essential to hold the annual meeting over again in order to correct previous unconstitutional procedure. Apparently this caused the eight players mentioned to attempt to embarrass the club by adopting an attitude of passive resistance. Realising it was possible that the players were being misled, the club made every effort to reason with them, and the committee was fortunate to find it had the co-operation of many young players willing and capable of assisting in an emergency".

Hassan was then named to play in the Marist senior rugby side and turned out for them at second five on 9 June. They lost to Manukau 8–3 with Hassan said to be "probably the pick of the Marist rearguard". The Herald reported "In the backs W. Hassan, playing his first game of rugby since leaving college, was outstanding, his strong running being a feature. If he had obtained more of the ball from the first five eighths, who kicked far too much, the result may have been different. Hassan is certainly an acquisition to the team". He scored a try for them in their 16–8 loss to Grammar after making a "fast dash and scored as he was tackled". Against North Shore 2 weeks later he scored 2 tries in a 23–3 win. He was selected as an emergency player for the Auckland B match against Thames on 7 July but did not play.

It was then reported that he was moving to Hamilton where he had accepted employment and would play for Hamilton-Marist. He played for them against Frankton on 14 July and scored a try in an 18–7 win. He was then chosen to play for the Hamilton representative side in a match with Waipa. They lost 15-11 though it was said that "several promising movements opened by Hassan failed". He then scored a try for Hamilton in their 3 August match with Morrinsville. Then on 11 August he played again for Marist against Old Boys in his final match of the season.

=== Return to Auckland and rugby league ===
Hassan returned to Auckland and joined the Mount Albert United club. He had to apply for reinstatement and this was confirmed in late April. He had been suspended by the Marist club prior to him leaving them the previous season however they uplifted the suspension and his transfer to Mount Albert was confirmed on 1 May. It was Mount Albert's first season in the top division and they had recruited strongly. Hassan debuted for them in their round 2 match against Ponsonby on 4 May. They won 15–10 with Hassan starting the match at fullback but moving into standoff during the match. He ultimately played 14 matches for them and scored 1 try. They performed surprisingly well and finished runners up in the championship after losing the final to Richmond 14–9. They also lost the Phelan Shield knockout final. In round 11 Mount Albert had a bye and Hassan was married and went away on his honeymoon to Rotorua. In the round 13 match against his old Marist team where Hassan scored his only try he was also sent off along with 3 others in a match marred by fighting. He was "severely reprimanded" but avoided suspension.

On 3 August he played for Auckland B against South Auckland and they won 17–9. Hassan was selected for the North Island side to play the South Island on 17 August however he was unavailable. At the end of the season Auckland went on a Southern Tour to play Wellington and Canterbury. Hassan appeared in both matches which saw Auckland win 39–27 over Wellington and 26–13 over Canterbury at Monica Park in Christchurch.

Hassan 'retired' at the end of 1935 and did not play at all in 1936, however he came out of retirement in 1937 to play again for Mount Albert. He injured his shoulder in a preliminary round match on 24 April against City Rovers and it was said that he would miss several week however he was able to turn out the very next week for their round 1 game against Richmond. He played his final Auckland competition match for Mount Albert after round 7 on 12 June against Ponsonby United, however his last game was for Mt Albert against a combined Taranaki side at Pukekura Park in New Plymouth on June 19 where he scored a try in a 28-15 win. He then retired from rugby league for the final time.

== Diving career ==
=== Ponsonby Swimming club and Auckland Champion ===
Hassan was a superb diver from a young age. He represented the Ponsonby Swimming Club from the late 1920s. Early in his career he was involved in a diving accident when he struck his head on the bottom of a pool on 18 February 1928.

In January 1929 he gave an exhibition of diving at the Parnell Club gala and it was said that he was "the best of the troupe…and should go a long way in championship diving". Then on 21 January at the Tepid Baths in Auckland he won the Auckland championship for springboard diving. Hassan was then chosen to represent the Auckland swimming team at the New Zealand championships in Wellington where he finished 3rd behind R.C. Calder, and N. Walker. It was his first national championship and he was said to have "performed splendidly". He was in fact the first diver to represent Auckland at the national championships "for some years" partly due to the Auckland diving facilities which were "undoubtedly the poorest of any in the main centres". He then won the Open Mens Diving competition at the Devonport Carnival in late April.

At the start of the 1929/30 season he had been unable to train properly owing to a finger injury. When the Auckland championships did take place in January, Hassan was able to compete but could only manage 3rd place. On 4 March he competed in the Cambridge Swimming Club gala and won the Ribbon Dive and the Men's Dive event. He then came second a week later at the Morrinsville Swimming Club gala.

The following season Hassan was back in form and won the Auckland Championship for the second time beating Harold Neale. He was then included in the Auckland side to compete at the national championships in Wanganui. He went one place better than his previous effort at the national championships by finishing second behind H.E. Walker of Otago. He was only behind by a narrow margin however in the final section he "failed in performing the running neat-header from the high board, losing several points". The following season in 1931/32 he was unable to defend his Auckland title as he was out of town for business reasons.

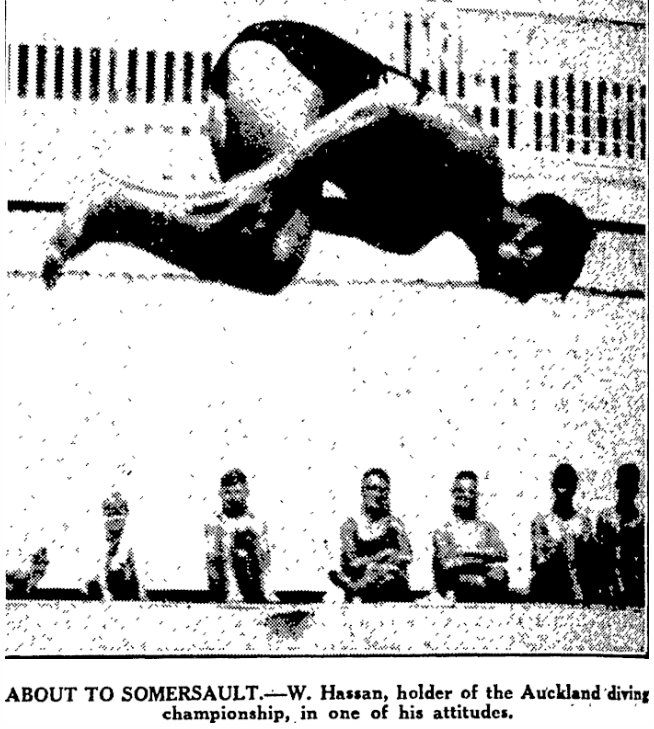
Hassan diving in 1931

During 1933 he won the Open Dive at the Ponsonby Swimming Carnival on 24 January in front of 1,000 spectators at the Tepid Baths. Then on 4 February he regained his Auckland Championship diving title after winning the final section for the high board at the Mount Eden Baths. Hassan and Harold Neale were the only two competitors who competed from the high board and Hassan won with 113 points to Neale's 103. The pools at the Tepid Baths only had room for low boards and the outdoor high board facilities were generally regarded as "inadequate". He was selected to go to Napier for the national championships but was unable to attend.

=== New Zealand champion (1934 & 1935) ===
Hassan began 1934 by winning the diving event at the Mount Eden Carnival on 15 January at the Mount Eden Baths. He finished ahead of G. Berry and D. Wright. Then in the Auckland championships at the Tepid Baths he defended his title by scoring 115 points. He was now representing the Mount Eden Swimming Club and beat E. Midgley who scored 109.5 points, with G. Berry in third. He was selected once more to represent Auckland at the New Zealand championships which were this time being held in Christchurch at St. Albans.

After day 1 of the event in which 5 dives were performed Hassan had "established a lead for the championship". Then on day 2 of the diving which concluded the event Hassan won the national title in heavy rain. His win "caused great enthusiasm among the Auckland team, because, although every swimming title has been held in Auckland, he is the first Aucklander to win the diving for 14 years". He finished ahead of future All Black Arthur Wesney and R.O. Johnson. He was also part of the Auckland team which won the Yaldhurst Shield for the best overall team. After returning to Auckland he won the Mount Eden Carnival over Bob Frankham. The New Zealand Herald wrote that no victory at the "New Zealand championship meeting was more deserved than W. Hassan’s in the men’s diving championship. His opportunities for diving in Auckland are restricted, because in regard to spring, height from the water and depth of water beneath, the boards are poor and unworthy of a city actively interested in natation. Hassan found the boards at St. Albans baths [Christchurch] the best in his experience, and certainly he performed splendid dives.

In January 1935 Hassan was again the Auckland champion after winning the title at the Mount Eden Baths. The New Zealand championships were to be held in Auckland in 1935 at the "eastern tide deflector" due to the lack of a single venue for both springboard and high board competition. Hassan then defended his national title by winning the New Zealand diving championship in an incredibly close result with a score of 107.72 points over Wesney once more who scored 107.41 points with 15 year old D. Ewart on 90.16 points.

Hassan then retired from the amateur ranks of diving and became a professional instructor at the Mount Eden Baths. By having turned ‘professional’ he was ineligible to compete any more.

== Personal life and death ==
Wilfred Hassan married Josephine Catherine Sayegh on 9 July 1935, at St. Benedict's Church. Catherine was the younger sister of Joe Sayegh a prominent New Zealand politician and businessman who had emigrated from Lebanon via Sydney, Australia. The 1935 Electoral Roll recorded him as living at 15 Beaconsfield Street, Grey Lynn, Auckland with his occupation as "engineer". He was living with family members Christian Theodore Hassan, Colin Hassan, Jane Kingswell Hassan, John Edgar Hassan, John Thomas Hassan, and Joseph William Hassan. On 18 November 1936, they had a son (Mark A. Hassan) at Nurse Warbrick's, Edenholme. Then on 31 July 1941, they had another son at St. Margaret's, Epsom. At the time they were living at 10 Boston Road in Mount Eden. Wilfred remarried at some point to Daisy Louisa and they had a daughter, Louise Suzanne Hassan, who died at the age of 3 months.

In the New Zealand Gazette of 24 June 1942 Wilfred's occupation was listed as an engineer.

Wilfred Hassan died on 10 September 1967, and was buried on 12 September, aged 57. (Note: His gravestone records his age as 59 and his middle name as "Thompson".) He was buried at Taruheru Cemetery in Gisborne.
