= Thomas Trevarthan =

NZ international rugby league footballer

Thomas Trevathan
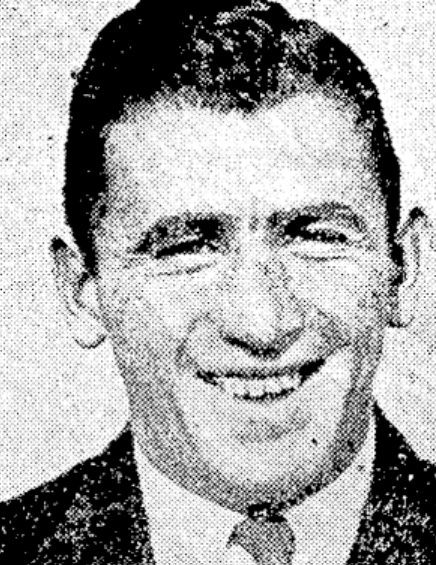

Personal information
- Born: 14 July 1910 New Zealand
- Died: unknown

Playing information

Rugby union
Club
Years	Team	Pld	T	G	FG	P
	North Otago

Rugby league
- Position: Centre, Stand-off
Club
Years	Team	Pld	T	G	FG	P
1936	Manukau	17	2	1	0	8
Representative
Years	Team	Pld	T	G	FG	P
1936	Auckland	1	0	0	0	0
1936	Auckland B	1	1	0	0	3
1936	New Zealand	2	0	1	0	2
- Relatives: David Trevarthan (brother); William Trevarthan (cousin)

Thomas Trevarthan (birth unknown – death unknown) was a New Zealand rugby union and professional rugby league footballer who played representative rugby league (RL) for New Zealand.

His brother, David, represented New Zealand in rugby union. He is also related to William Trevarthen, a member of the 1907-08 All Golds.

== Playing career ==
Trevarthan originally played rugby union for North Otago.

In 1936 he moved to Auckland and switched codes, joining the Manukau rugby league club. That same year Trevarthan was selected to represent Auckland and played in two test matches for New Zealand against Great Britain.
