= 1968 New Year Honours (New Zealand) =

Annual awards for New Zealanders

The 1968 New Year Honours in New Zealand were appointments by Elizabeth II on the advice of the New Zealand government to various orders and honours to reward and highlight good works by New Zealanders. The awards celebrated the passing of 1967 and the beginning of 1968, and were announced on 1 January 1968.

The recipients of honours are displayed here as they were styled before their new honour.

== Knight Bachelor ==
- William Calder Mackay OBE MC JP – of Auckland. For services to the community, particularly in the fields of commerce and welfare work.

== Order of the Bath ==
=== Companion (CB) ===
Military division

- Air Vice-Marshal Cameron Archer Turner CBE – Royal New Zealand Air Force.

== Order of Saint Michael and Saint George ==
=== Companion (CMG) ===
- Orton Sutherland Hintz – of Auckland. For services in the field of journalism.
- The Most Reverend James Michael Liston – Roman Catholic Bishop of Auckland.
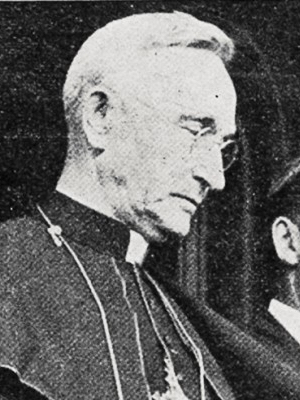
James Liston

== Order of the British Empire ==
=== Knight Commander (KBE) ===
Civil division

- John Te Herekiekie Grace MVO JP. For services to the Māori people and in public affairs.

=== Commander (CBE) ===
Civil division

- Matthew Oliver Barnett – of Wellington. For services in the field of commercial law.
- Anthony Ian Cottrell – of Christchurch. For services to the community.
- Hallam Walter Dowling – of Taradale. For services to local government and to the community.
- Thomas Clarence Morrison JP. For services to sport, especially rugby football.

Military division

- Brigadier Harold Albert Purcell DSO ED ADC – Brigadiers' List (Regular Force), New Zealand Military Forces.
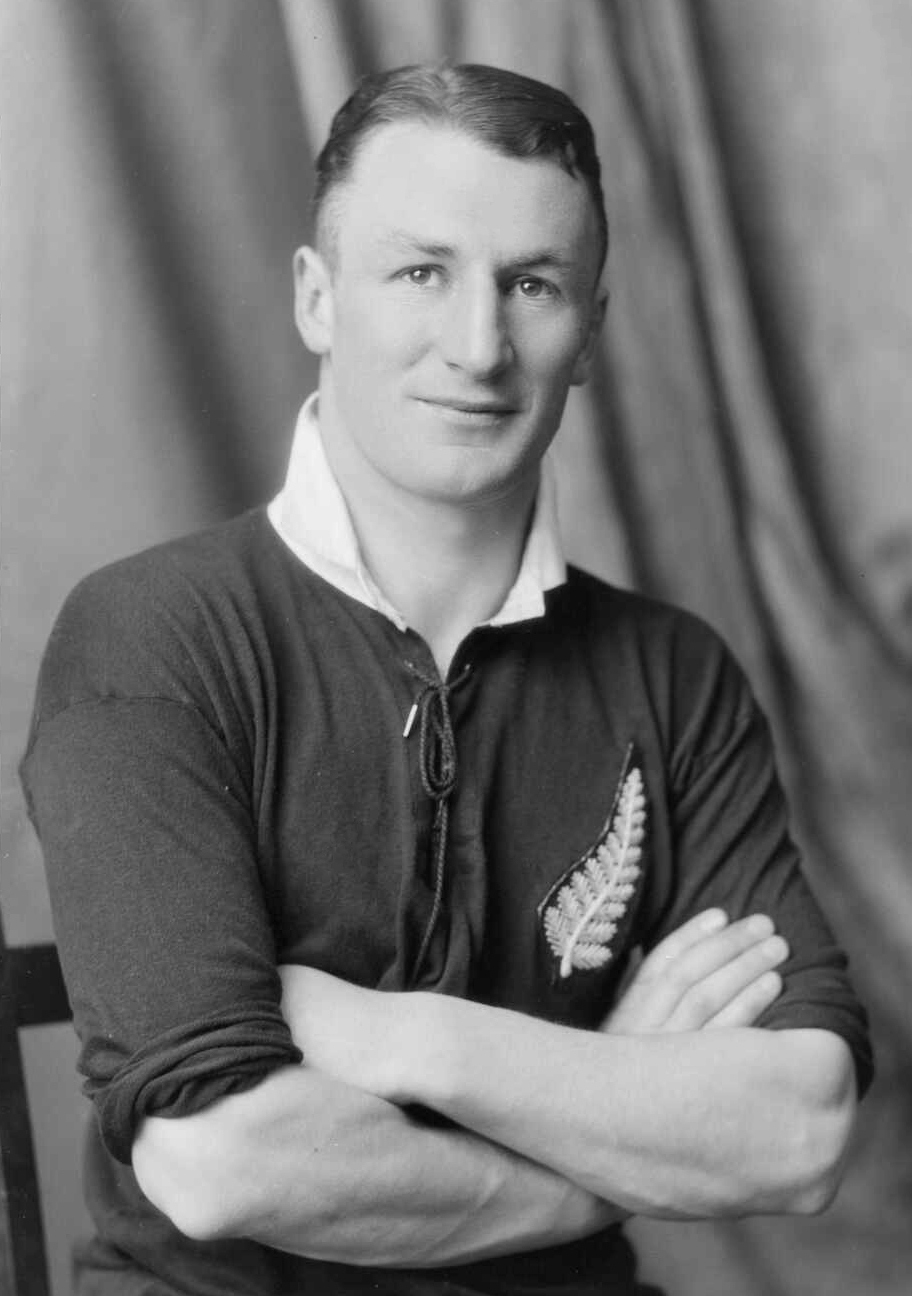
Anthony Cottrell

=== Officer (OBE) ===
Civil division

- William Sykes Baverstock – director, Robert McDougall Art Gallery, Christchurch. For services to art.
- Reginald George James Berry – of Wellington; artist and designer. For services as designer of postage stamps and decimal currency coins.
- Kenneth Clifford Alwyn Carter – of Auckland. For services to the saw-milling and timber industry.
- Eric Mitchell Elder MB ChB – of Tuatapere. For services to the community, especially as a medical practitioner.
- Raymond Ferner JP – of Tauranga. For services to local government and to the legal profession.
- Rua Isobel Gardner – of Auckland. For services to education.
- Oswald George James – of Hamilton. For services to the farming industry.
- William Malcolm – of North Otago. For services to the farming community.
- Horace Mawson JP – of Dargaville. For services to education.
- Michael Elliott Shackleton MB FRCS – of Dunedin. For services as leader and surgeon of the New Zealand surgical team at Qui Nhơn, South Vietnam.
- Hamish Stewart Thomas – of Anakiwa. For services to the Outward Bound School of New Zealand.

Military division

- Commander (Honorary) William Henry Minchall VRD – Royal New Zealand Navy.
- Lieutenant-Colonel Ralph Minton Grierson ED – Royal New Zealand Artillery (Territorial Force).
- Group Captain Malcolm Stuart Gunton AFC – Royal New Zealand Air Force.

=== Member (MBE) ===
Civil division

- Emily Church Craven – of Blenheim. For services to the community.
- Mervyn Thomas Dearsly – of Palmerston North. For services to the community.
- Alfred Harold Finnie JP – of Dunedin. For services to local government.
- The Reverend William Wesley Hamilton Greenslade – of Rotorua. For services to the community especially in connection with the Methodist Church of New Zealand.
- D'Arcy Ormonde Haskell – of Napier; advisory commissioner to Taupo County Council.
- Frederick Ensor Humphreys – of Gisborne. For services to the farming community.
- Helen Mary Johnson – of Wellington. For services to the School Dental Service, especially as matron of the Wellington School.
- Richard Thomas Mounsey – of Auckland. For services in the field of civil aviation, especially as a senior airline captain in New Zealand National Airways Corporation.
- Edward William Norman. For services to the community in Woodville and Pahiatua.
- Austin Edward Reid MM JP – of Carterton. For services to local government as chairman of Wairarapa South County Council for many years.
- Robert Clarence Reid JP – of Auckland. For services to the community in local government and welfare activities.
- Robert William Robson – of Stratford. For services to ex-service personnel and families.
- Alfred Geoffrey Scott – of Wellington; manager of the National Film Unit.
- Thomas Duncan Scott – of Dannevirke. For services to education.
- Isabella Ramsay Stevenson – of Gore. For services to the nursing profession.
- Mona Bessie Veitch – of Wellington. For services to the community over many years.
- Cecil Roy Wylde. For services to the community especially as mayor of the borough of Runanga.

Military division

- Lieutenant Reginald Goddard – Royal New Zealand Navy.
- Major Samuel Bruce Matthews – Royal New Zealand Infantry Regiment (Territorial Force).
- The Reverend James Hugh McNeill – chaplain third class, Royal New Zealand Chaplains' Department (Regular Force).
- Major Roger John Pearce – Royal New Zealand Artillery (Regular Force).
- Warrant Officer Class I, Peter Emil Wischnowsky – Royal New Zealand Infantry Regiment (Regular Force).
- Squadron Officer Gilda St Clair Bezar – Women's Royal New Zealand Air Force.
- Flight Lieutenant Johnston Vivian William Thomas BEM – Royal New Zealand Air Force.

== Companion of the Imperial Service Order (ISO) ==
- Douglas Archibald Campbell – of Wellington; chief advisory officer, Soil Conservation Control Council.
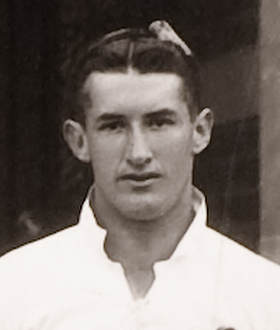
Douglas Campbell

== British Empire Medal (BEM) ==
Civil division, for gallantry

- Leila Mary Robertson – occupational health nurse, Auckland International Airport. For services when a passenger aircraft crashed on the runway at Auckland International Airport.

Civil division, for meritorious service

- Alison Grace Booth. For services to the community, particularly with the Taupō St John Ambulance Association.
- William Charles Chambers. For services to the community, particularly with the St John Ambulance Association, Rangiora.
- Louis Irvine Dolman – constable, New Zealand Police Force.
- James Hunt Harding – substation operator, Electricity Department, Te Puke.
- Albert Richard Hurst – lately overseer, Health Department, Nelson.
- Kenneth Ray Lott – garage supervisor, Railways Department.
- Piata Heni Park – lately deaconess, Church of England Diocese, Christchurch.
- William Niu Tirene Puke – technician, Post Office.
- Arthur Waldin Soundy. For services to the Dannevirke Branch of the Blind Foundation.
- Mary Jane Symon. For services to the community of Timaru.

Military division

- Chief Petty Officer Dental Assistant George Leslie Bouterey – Royal New Zealand Navy.
- Chief Shipwright Desmond John Butler – Royal New Zealand Navy.
- Chief Petty Officer Alastair Mark Cameron – Royal New Zealand Navy.
- Regulating Coxswain Stanley Harper – Royal New Zealand Navy.
- Staff Sergeant Henry Keith Handley – Royal New Zealand Infantry Regiment (Regular Force).
- Sergeant George Arthur Horsfall – Royal New Zealand Infantry Regiment (Regular Force).
- Staff Sergeant Robert Charles James – Royal New Zealand Infantry Regiment (Regular Force).
- Flight Sergeant Robert Henry Palmer – Royal New Zealand Air Force.
- Sergeant Bobbie Miwa Edwards – Royal New Zealand Air Force.

== Queen's Police Medal (QPM) ==
- George Claridge – chief superintendent, New Zealand Police Force.

== Queen's Fire Services Medal (QFSM) ==
- Matthew Ferguson Morton – chief fire officer, Wanganui Fire Brigade.
- Leslie Vincent Horne – deputy chief fire officer, Petone Fire Brigade.

== Air Force Cross (AFC) ==
- Wing Commander Bernard Joseph O'Connor – Royal New Zealand Air Force.

== Queen's Commendation for Valuable Service in the Air ==
- Flight Lieutenant Noel James Stewart Rodger – Royal New Zealand Air Force.
