= Orton Sutherland Hintz =

New Zealand journalist, newspaper editor, writer and fisherman

Orton Sutherland Hintz CMG (15 November 1907 – 18 November 1985) was a New Zealand journalist, newspaper editor, writer and fisherman. He was born in Hāwera, New Zealand, on 15 November 1907.

In the 1968 New Year Honours, Hintz was appointed a Companion of the Order of St Michael and St George for services in the field of journalism.
