= Douglas Campbell (soil conservator) =

New Zealand teacher and soil conservator (1906–1969)

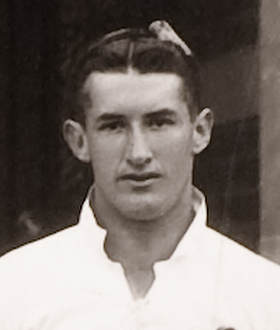
Campbell in 1929, as a member of the Canterbury Agricultural College Football Club 1st XV

Douglas Archibald Campbell ISO (13 December 1906 – 7 March 1969) was a New Zealand teacher and soil conservator. He was born in Dunedin, New Zealand, on 13 December 1906.

Campbell graduated from Canterbury Agricultural College (now Lincoln University) with a Master's degree on red clover in 1930.

In 1967, Campbell was awarded the Bledisloe Medal by the Canterbury Agricultural College. In the 1968 New Year Honours, he was appointed a Companion of the Imperial Service Order.
