= Peter Bush (photographer) =

New Zealand photographer (1930–2023)

Peter Bush CNZM QSM
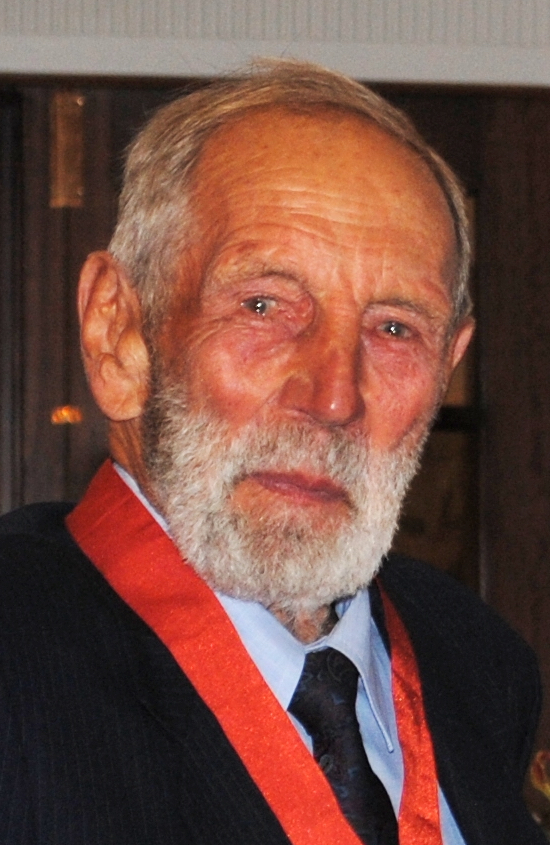
- Bush in 2011
- Born: Peter George Bush; 16 October 1930
- Died: 16 December 2023 (aged 93); Wellington, New Zealand
- Occupation: Photojournalist
- Relatives: Ronald Bush (uncle)

Peter George Bush CNZM QSM (16 October 1930 – 16 December 2023) was a New Zealand photographer and photojournalist, best known as the country's leading sports photographer. He also served as a war correspondent, and was the long-serving vice president of the National Press Club.

== Life ==
Born on 16 October 1930, Bush was educated at Marist High School, Greymouth and Sacred Heart College, Auckland. His sports journalism career began in 1949, when he photographed his first rugby union test match for The New Zealand Herald. Since then he has photographed most All Black matches in a career that has spanned over 60 years. A major exhibition of his sixty-year career of rugby photographs, "Hard on the heels", toured thirteen centres in New Zealand in 2010–11.

In the 1991 New Year Honours, Bush was awarded the Queen's Service Medal for public services. In the 2011 New Year Honours, he was appointed a Companion of the New Zealand Order of Merit, for services to photography. He lived in and worked from Island Bay in Wellington.

Peter Bush was a nephew of 1931 All Black Ronald Bush. He died in Wellington on 16 December 2023, at the age of 93.

== Biography ==
- A Life in Focus, by Paul Thomas and Peter Bush, (2009, Hodder Moa) ISBN 978-1-86971-064-4
