= Rua Gardner =

New Zealand teacher and principal (1901–1972)

Rua Isobel Gardner OBE (13 March 1901 – 25 May 1972) was a New Zealand teacher and principal. She was born in Devonport, Auckland, New Zealand, on 13 March 1901.

In 1953, Gardner was awarded the Queen Elizabeth II Coronation Medal. In the 1968 New Year Honours, she was appointed an Officer of the Order of the British Empire, for services to education.
