= Anthony Cottrell (rugby union) =

NZ international rugby union player

Anthony Cottrell CBE
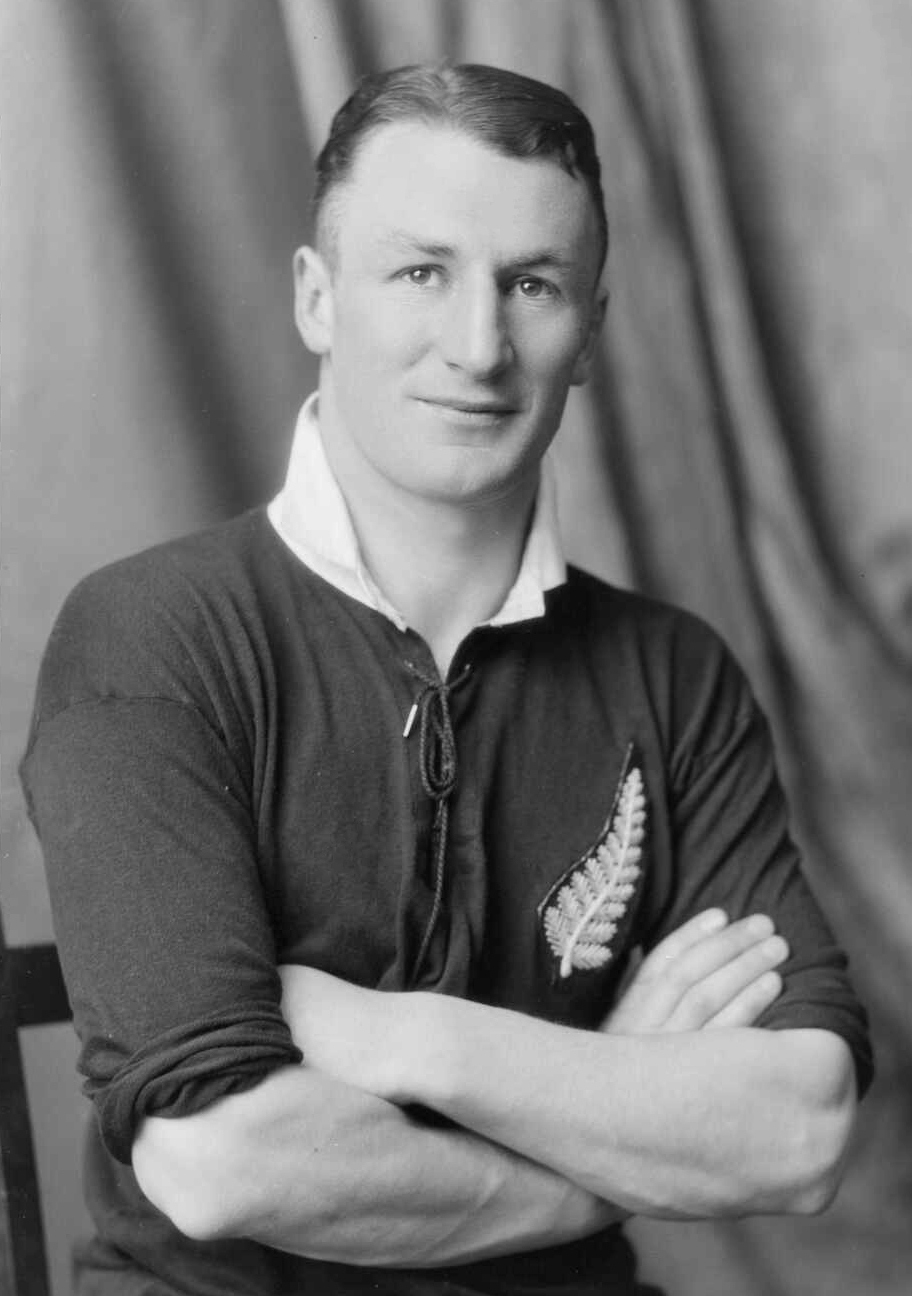
- Born: Anthony Ian Cottrell; 10 February 1907 Westport, New Zealand
- Died: 10 December 1988 (aged 81) Christchurch, New Zealand
- Height: 1.78 m (5 ft 10 in)
- Weight: 80 kg (180 lb)
- School: Christ's College
- Occupation(s): Barrister and solicitor

Rugby union career
- Position: Hooker and prop
Provincial / State sides
Years	Team	Apps	(Points)
1928–34	Canterbury	39	
International career
Years	Team	Apps	(Points)
1929–32	New Zealand	11	(0)

Anthony Ian "Beau" Cottrell CBE (10 February 1907 – 10 December 1988) was a New Zealand rugby union player. A hooker and prop, Cottrell represented Canterbury at a provincial level and was a member of the New Zealand national side, the All Blacks, from 1929 to 1932. He played 22 matches for the All Blacks including 11 internationals. He went on to serve as a member of the management committee of the Canterbury Rugby Union.

During World War II, Cottrell served as an officer with the New Zealand 20th Battalion. He was taken prisoner-of-war during the First Battle of El Alamein in July 1942, when he was wounded going to the assistance of a wounded man in his platoon.

Cottrell was later an active Rotarian and served as a district governor. In the 1968 New Year Honours, he was appointed a Commander of the Order of the British Empire, for services to the community. In 1977, Cottrell was awarded the Queen Elizabeth II Silver Jubilee Medal.
