= Jack Manchester =

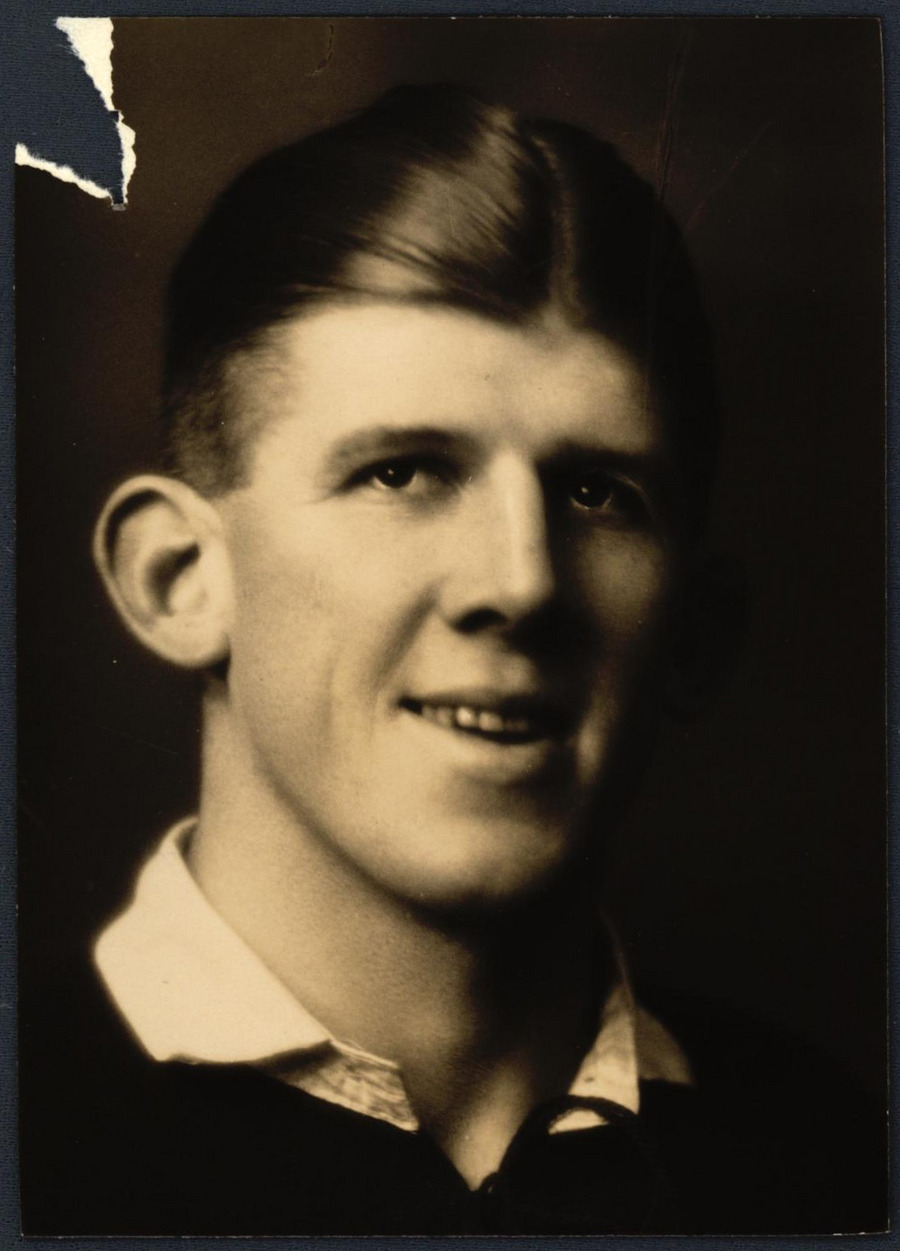
- John in 1935
- Born: John Eaton Manchester; 29 January 1908 Waimate, New Zealand
- Died: 6 September 1983 (aged 75) Dunedin, New Zealand
- Height: 1.85 m (6 ft 1 in)
- Weight: 90 kg (200 lb)
- School: Timaru Boys' High School

Rugby union career
- Position: Flanker
Amateur team(s)
Years	Team	Apps	(Points)
- Christchurch
Provincial / State sides
Years	Team	Apps	(Points)
1928–36	Canterbury	59	
International career
Years	Team	Apps	(Points)
1932–36	New Zealand	9	(3)
Coaching career
- Years: Team
- 1947–52: Otago University

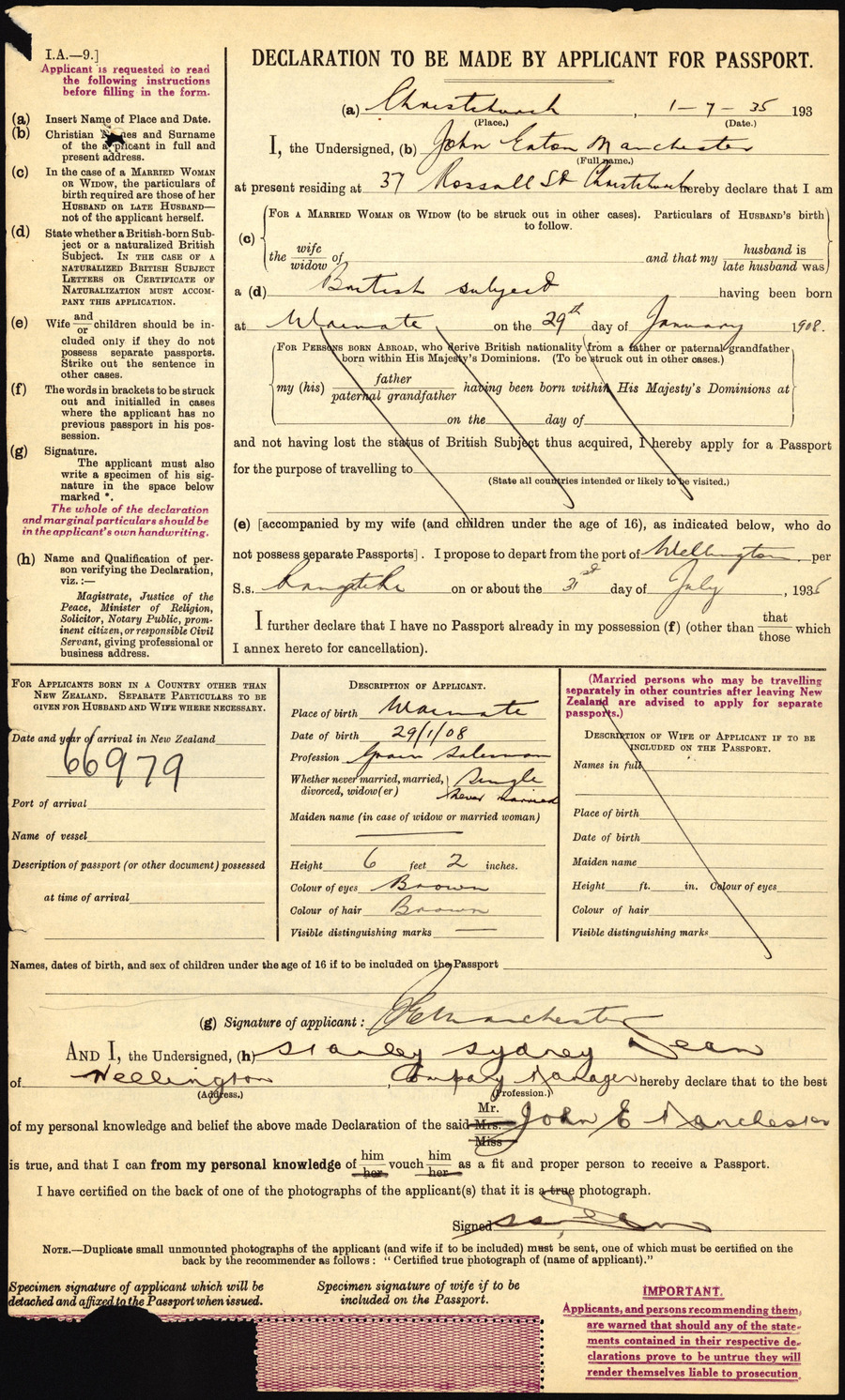
John Eaton Manchester passport application

John Eaton Manchester (29 January 1908 – 6 September 1983) was a New Zealand rugby union player. A flanker, Manchester played club rugby for Christchurch and represented Canterbury at a provincial level. He was a member of the New Zealand national side, the All Blacks, from 1932 to 1936, and played 36 matches—20 as captain—for the All Blacks including nine internationals. He later coached the Otago University club from 1947 to 1952, having moved to Dunedin after World War II.

Manchester died in Dunedin on 6 September 1983.
