= David Trevathan =

- Born: 6 May 1912 Mosgiel, New Zealand
- Died: 11 April 1986 (aged 73) Dunedin, New Zealand
- Height: 1.73 m (5 ft 8 in)
- Weight: 76 kg (12 st 0 lb)
- School: Macandrew Road School
- Notable relative: Thomas Trevarthan (brother)

Rugby union career
- Position: First five-eighth
International career
Years	Team	Apps	(Points)
1937	New Zealand	3	(16)

David Trevathan (6 May 1912 — 11 April 1986) was a New Zealand rugby union international.

Born in Mosgiel, Trevathan was educated at Macandrew Road School.

Trevathan, a first five-eighth and skilled exponent of the drop goal, was a member of the first ever Otago side to win the Ranfurly Shield in 1935. He kicked 28 drop goals in 44 appearances for Otago.

In 1937, Trevathan played all three Tests for the All Blacks against the touring Springboks in 1937, as a half-back partner to Southern teammate Harry Simon. His 10 points in the 1st Test at Athletic Park helped defeat the Springboks, but the All Blacks ultimately lost the series and Trevathan was not selected again.

Trevathan's elder brother Thomas played rugby league for New Zealand.

== See also ==
- List of New Zealand national rugby union players
