= Arthur Wesney =

- Full name: Arthur William Wesney
- Born: 1 February 1915 Invercargill, New Zealand
- Died: 23 November 1941 (aged 26) Sidi Rezegh, Libya
- Height: 1.74 m (5 ft 9 in)
- Weight: 79 kg (174 lb)

Rugby union career
- Position: Utility back
International career
Years	Team	Apps	(Points)
1938	New Zealand		

Arthur William Wesney (1 February 1915 — 23 November 1941) was a New Zealand rugby union international.

Born in Invercargill, Wesney was educated at Southland Boys' High School. He represented Southland in cricket and water polo, in addition to rugby, and was twice runner-up to Wilf Hassan in the national diving championships.

Wesney, a versatile, goal-kicking back, was on the Southland team which claimed the 1937 Ranfurly Shield from Otago. He toured Australia with the All Blacks in 1938 and featured in three of the uncapped matches, which included a hat-trick of tries against the Australian Capital Territory at Manuka Oval in Canberra.

During World War II, Wesney served with the 26th Battalion and attained the rank of captain. He was killed in action while leading a charge on German positions at Sidi Rezegh, Libya in 1941, at the age of 26.

== See also ==
- List of New Zealand national rugby union players
