= Tori Reid =

New Zealand rugby union player (1912–2003)

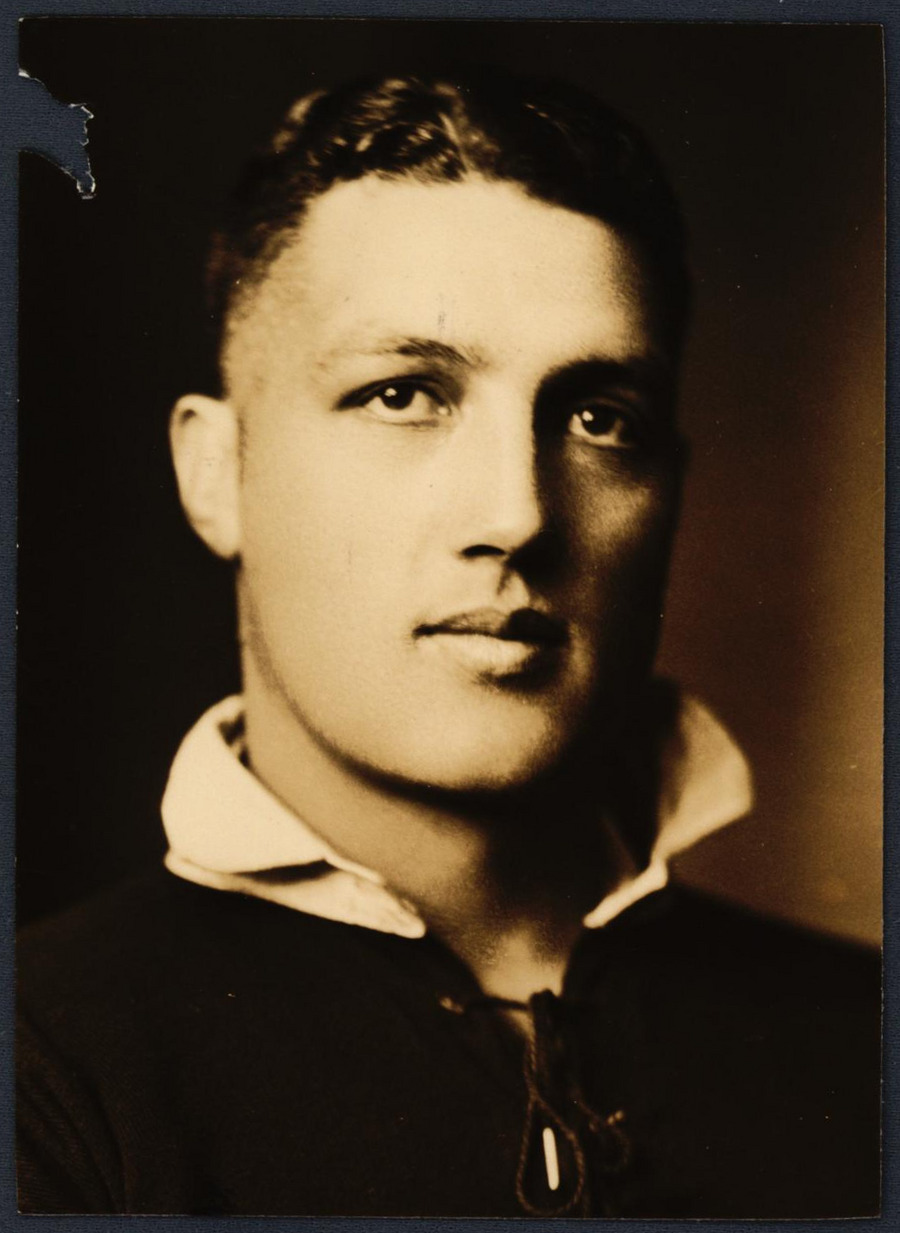
- Sana Torium in 1935
- Born: Sana Torium Reid; 22 September 1912 Tokomaru Bay, New Zealand
- Died: 19 March 2003 (aged 90) Hastings, New Zealand
- Height: 1.88 m (6 ft 2 in)
- Weight: 95 kg (209 lb)
- School: Tolaga Bay High School

Rugby union career
- Position(s): Lock; Flanker
Provincial / State sides
Years	Team	Apps	(Points)
- East Coast
-	Hawke's Bay		
International career
Years	Team	Apps	(Points)
1931–49	New Zealand Māori		
1935–37	New Zealand	9	(6)

Sana Torium "Tori" Reid (22 September 1912 – 19 March 2003) was a New Zealand rugby union player. A lock and flanker, Reid represented East Coast and Hawke's Bay at a provincial level, and was a member of the New Zealand national side, the All Blacks, from 1935 to 1937. He played 27 matches for the All Blacks including nine internationals. Affiliating to Ngāti Porou, Reid represented New Zealand Māori between 1931 and 1949. In a long first-class career from 1929 to 1952, he played 157 games, which was then a New Zealand record. Between 1952 and 1954, Reid served as a New Zealand Māori selector.

He was selected by the editors of the 1937 Rugby Almanac of New Zealand as one of their 5 players of the year.
