= Cameron Turner (RNZAF officer) =

New Zealand RNZAF officer (1915–1999)

- Born: 29 August 1915; Whanganui, New Zealand
- Died: 29 November 1999 (aged 84); Wellington, New Zealand
- Military career
- Allegiance: United Kingdom; New Zealand
- Branch: Royal Air Force (1936–40); Royal New Zealand Air Force (1940–69)
- Service years: 1936–1969
- Rank: Air Vice-Marshal
- Commands: Chief of Air Staff; RNZAF Station Ohakea; RNZAF Station Taieri; RNZAF Station Nausori
- Conflicts: Second World War
- Awards: Companion of the Order of the Bath; Commander of the Order of the British Empire

Air Vice-Marshal Cameron Archer Turner, CB, CBE (29 August 1915 – 26 November 1999) was a senior Royal New Zealand Air Force (RNZAF) officer, who served as Chief of Air Staff from 1966 to 1969.

Turner joined the Royal Air Force in 1936, before being commissioned in the RNZAF in 1940 and serving in the Second World War. He would go on to command four RNZAF stations, to hold a number of staff appointments, and was Air Member for Supply before being appointed head of the RNZAF. In retirement, he was director of the New Zealand Inventions Development Authority (1969–1976) and president of the Royal New Zealand Air Force Association (1972–1981).

Turner was appointed a Commander of the Order of the British Empire in the 1960 New Year Honours, and a Companion of the Order of the Bath in the 1968 New Year Honours.

Military offices
Preceded by Ian Morrison	Chief of the Air Staff (RNZAF); 1966–1969	Succeeded by William Stratton
