= Jack Taylor (rugby union, born 1913) =

- Born: John McLeod Taylor; 12 January 1913 Mataura, New Zealand
- Died: 5 May 1979 (aged 66) Wellington, New Zealand
- Height: 1.75 m (5 ft 9 in)
- Weight: 77 kg (170 lb)
- School: Wyndham District High School
- Notable relative: Justin Marshall (nephew)
- Occupation: Public servant

Rugby union career
- Position: Fullback
Provincial / State sides
| Years | Team | Apps | (Points) |
| 1933–38 | Otago | 35 | |
| 1939–40 | Wellington | 10 | |
International career
| Years | Team | Apps | (Points) |
| 1937–38 | New Zealand | 6 | (24) |
Coaching career
- Years: Team
- Wellington

John McLeod Taylor (12 January 1913 – 5 May 1979) was a New Zealand rugby union player. A fullback, Taylor represented Otago and Wellington at a provincial level. He was a member of the New Zealand national side, the All Blacks, in 1937 and 1938. In all, he played nine matches for the All Blacks, including six internationals, scoring 45 points in all. After World War II, Taylor remained active in rugby as a coach, selector and administrator, including a period as Wellington coach, and later as chair of the Wellington Rugby Union management committee.
