= Ronald Bush =

New Zealand rugby union player and coach (1909–1996)

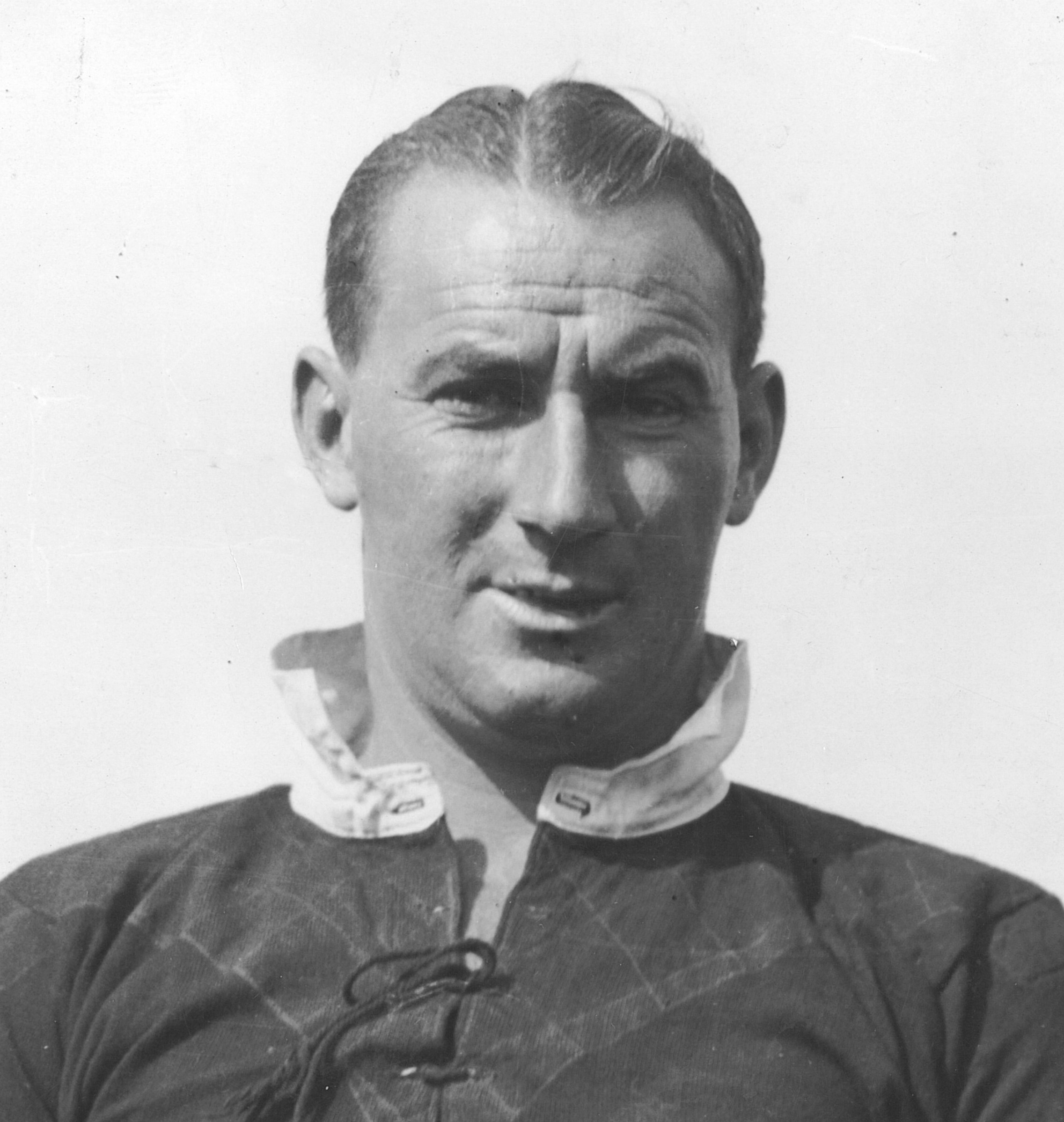
- Bush in 1931
- Born: Ronald George Bush; 3 May 1909 Nelson, New Zealand
- Died: 10 May 1996 (aged 87) Auckland, New Zealand
- Height: 1.84 m (6 ft 0 in)
- Weight: 92 kg (203 lb)
- School: Mount Albert Grammar School
- Notable relative: Peter Bush (nephew)

Rugby union career
- Position: Fullback
Provincial / State sides
Years	Team	Apps	(Points)
1928–30, 32–37	Auckland		
1931	Otago		
International career
Years	Team	Apps	(Points)
1931	New Zealand	1	(14)
- Cricket career

Cricket information
- Batting: Right-handed
- Bowling: Right-arm fast-medium

Domestic team information
- Years: Team
- 1932/33–1936/37: Auckland

Career statistics
Competition	First-class
Matches	10
Runs scored	319
Batting average	19.93
100s/50s	0/1
Top score	55
Balls bowled	1,710
Wickets	25
Bowling average	25.64
5 wickets in innings	0
10 wickets in match	0
Best bowling	4/35
Catches/stumpings	5/–
- Source: Cricinfo, 6 August 2020

Ronald George Bush (3 May 1909 – 10 May 1996) was a New Zealand rugby union player and coach. He played one test match for the All Blacks in 1931 and was coach of the All Blacks in 1962.

== Biography ==
Bush was born in Nelson in 1909 and was educated at Mount Albert Grammar School. He was an uncle of sports photographer Peter Bush.

Bush played his only test match for the All Blacks in 1931 at fullback, although he was versatile and also played as a loose forward, three-quarter and five-eighth.

With Hubert McLean he was one of the founders of the New Zealand Barbarians in 1937; their first game was against Auckland in 1938. Bush was the All Blacks coach in 1962.

He was also a cricketer who played 10 first-class matches for the Auckland cricket team between 1932 and 1937.

He died in Auckland in 1996.

Sporting positions
Preceded by Neil McPhail	All Blacks coach 1962	Succeeded by Fred Allen
