= Ashburton County Rugby Union =

Ashburton County
Club information
- Full name: Ashburton County Rugby Union
- Colours: Black and white
- Founded: 1904

The Ashburton County Rugby Union was formed in 1904 and was originally affiliated to the South Canterbury Union, before being affiliated to the Canterbury Union as a sub-union from 1905 to 1926. Full status was granted in 1927, and the name of the union changed to the Mid Canterbury Rugby Football Union in 1952.
