= Tepid Baths =

Indoor swimming pool in Auckland, New Zealand

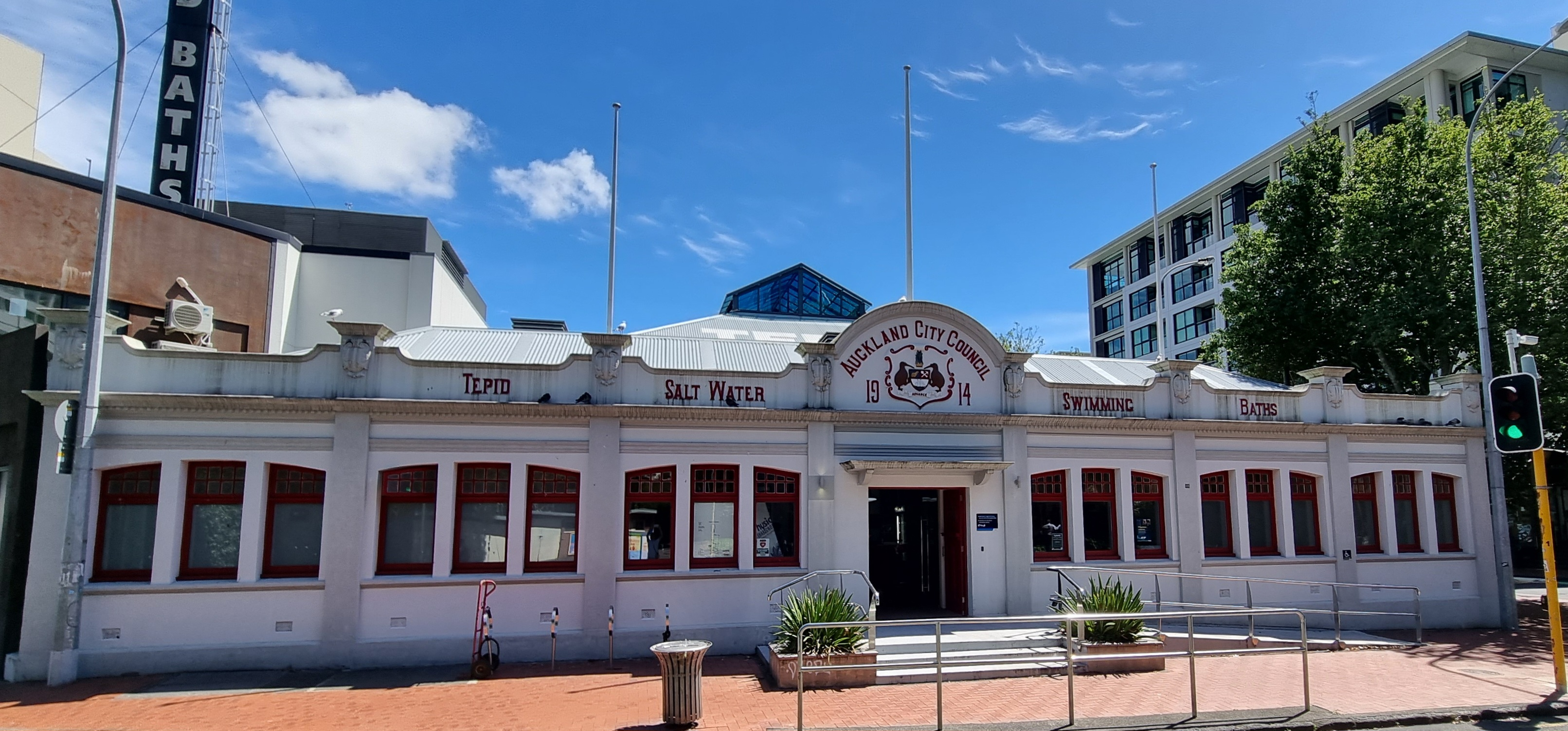
- Tepid Baths

General information
- Location: 86-102 Customs St West, Auckland, New Zealand
- Coordinates: 36°50′38″S 174°45′47″E
- Opened: 1914
- Renovated: 1986, 1997, 2010-2012
- Owner: Auckland Council

Heritage New Zealand – Category 2
- Designated: 4 April 1997
- Reference no.: 7377

The Tepid Baths is a public indoor pool complex in Auckland, New Zealand. The baths opened in 1914 on a site that had previously been occupied by a small drydock and were very well-received by the public, with the new baths attracting 30,000 visitors in the first two months after opening.

In 2010 the baths closed for a major refurbishment, re-opening in mid-2012 after a two year re-build.

The main pool is 1.1m in the shallowest end, and 2.1m in the deepest end.

In 1997 the building gained a Category II listing from Heritage New Zealand.

== History ==
The Tepid Baths was originally leased from the Auckland Harbour Board, and contain two separate pools, a "male" (25 m, 6 lanes) and "female" (18 m, 4 lane). The "male" pool was the largest in New Zealand at the time. The pools were heated with hot water from the nearby tramways power plant, the system being considered an engineering masterpiece of its time.

The pools were not only extensively used for both recreational and competitive swimming, but also for some other activities – in one event in the early 1930s, a pentecostal minister baptised a hundred new faithful in the pools. Two local athletes were employed as custodians of the baths, swimmer Malcolm Champion (who frequently swam across the harbour to and from his North Shore home) and runner Billy Savidan.

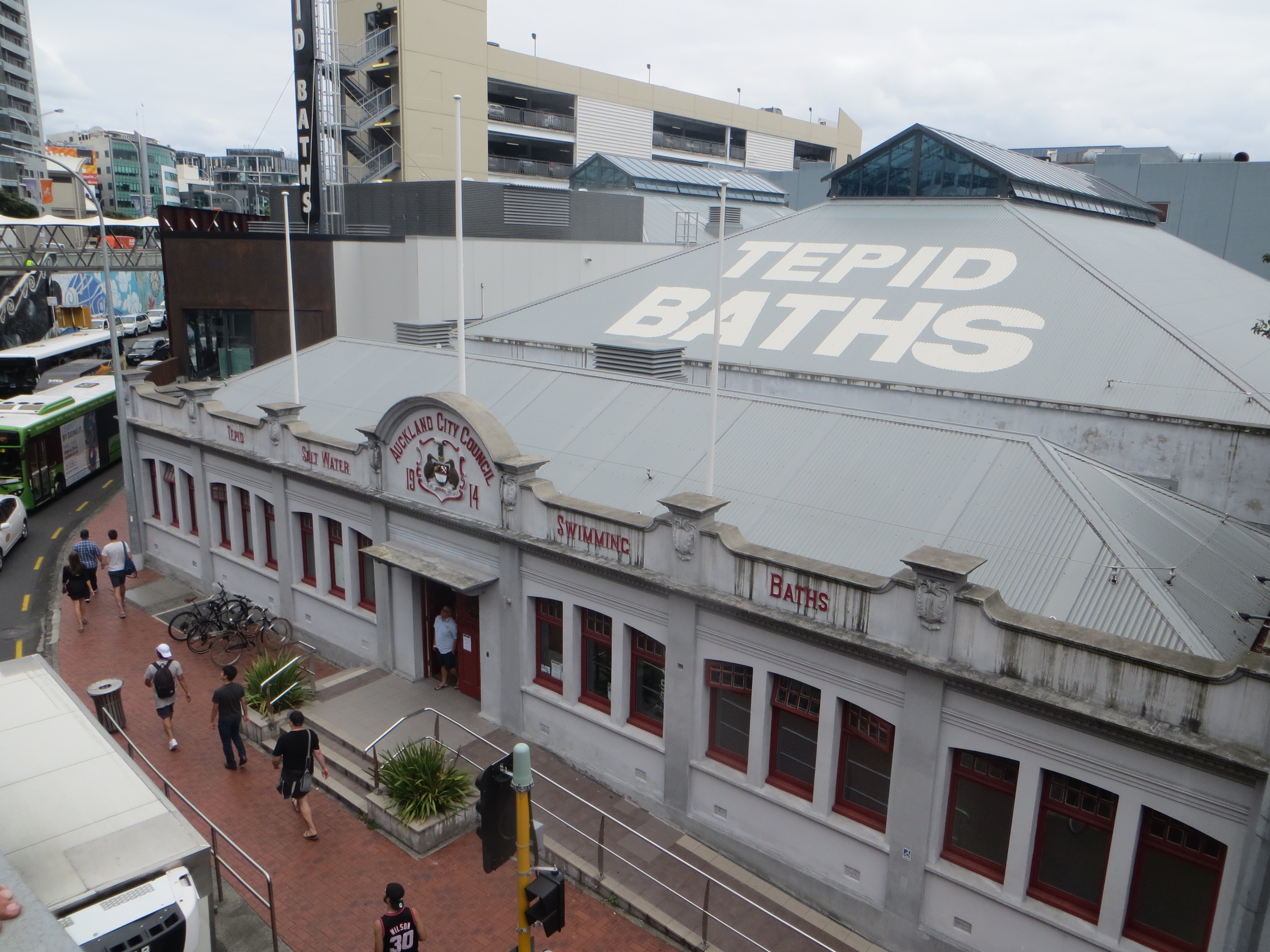
View from Hobson Street flyover in 2016

In 1974, the salt water pools (previously fed from the Waitematā Harbour) were transformed into fresh water pools, primarily for maintenance reasons. The facility was refurbished in 1986 and again after the YMCA received the management lease in 1997 from Auckland City Council. Renovations included new sauna and steam rooms, and a gym on the upper level (YMCA club members only). Nowadays, a large part of the Tepid Baths' customers are people working in the Auckland CBD who swim here before or after work.

In November 2009 it was announced that the Tepid Baths would close for a period of up to four years for a $12 million restoration project to address structural issues exacerbated by saltwater effects. It was hoped the pool would reopen in time for its 100th anniversary in 2014. The baths closed in April 2010, with the Y-Fitness Centre having already moved to a new purpose-built facility at the ANZ Centre on Albert Street. While the restoration costs rose later to approximately $16 million, the pools were closed only until mid-2012 when they reopened.

In late 2012, the restored building won the New Zealand Project Management Institute's (PMINZ) Public Sector Project of the Year award.
