= George Hart (rugby union) =

New Zealand rugby union player (1909–1944)

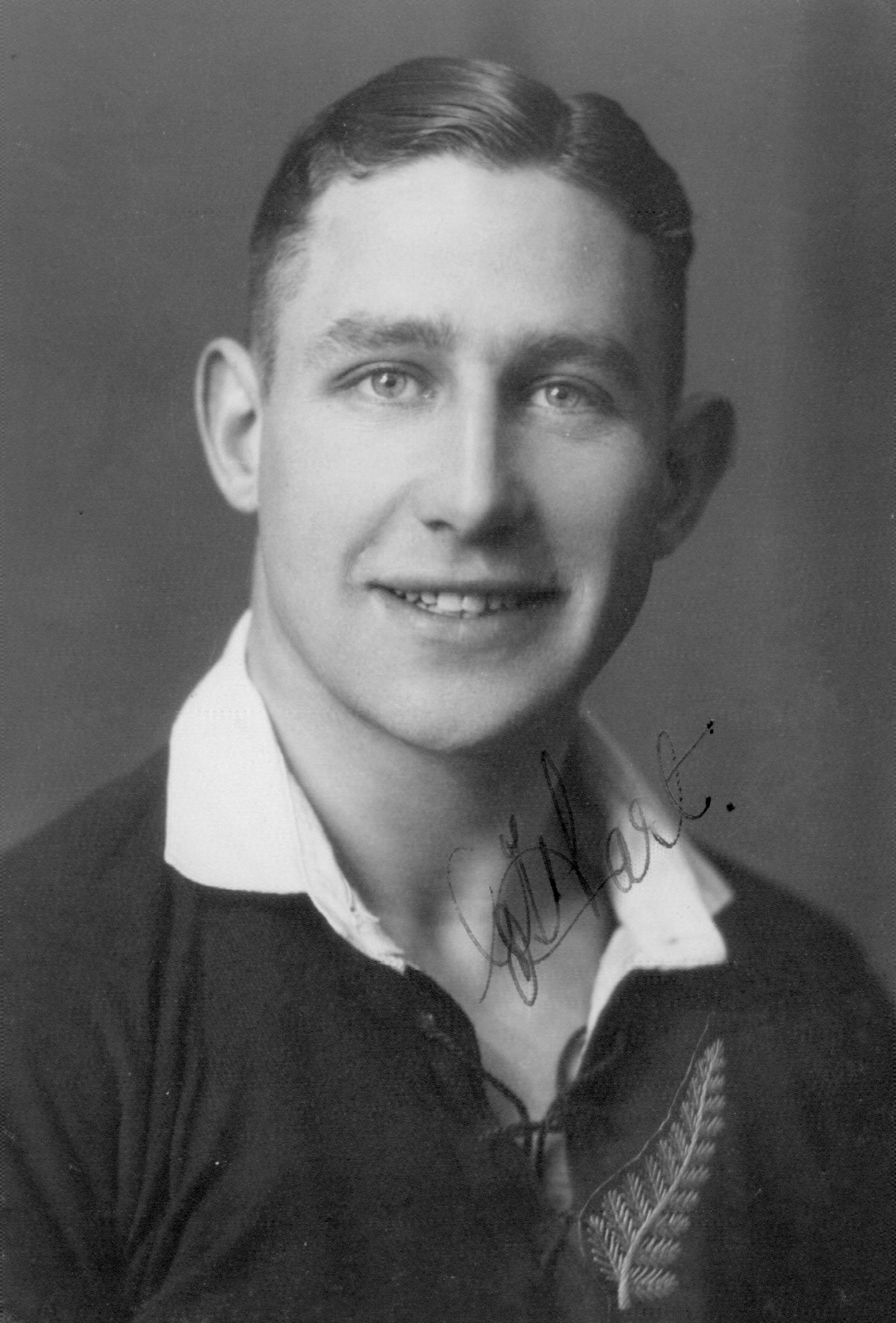
- Born: George Fletcher Hart; 10 February 1909 Christchurch, New Zealand
- Died: 3 June 1944 (aged 35) Sora, Italy
- Height: 1.70 m (5 ft 7 in)
- Weight: 79 kg (174 lb)
- School: Waitaki Boys' High School

Rugby union career
- Position: Wing three-quarter
Provincial / State sides
Years	Team	Apps	(Points)
1928–36	Canterbury	40	(126)
International career
Years	Team	Apps	(Points)
1930–36	New Zealand	11	(21)

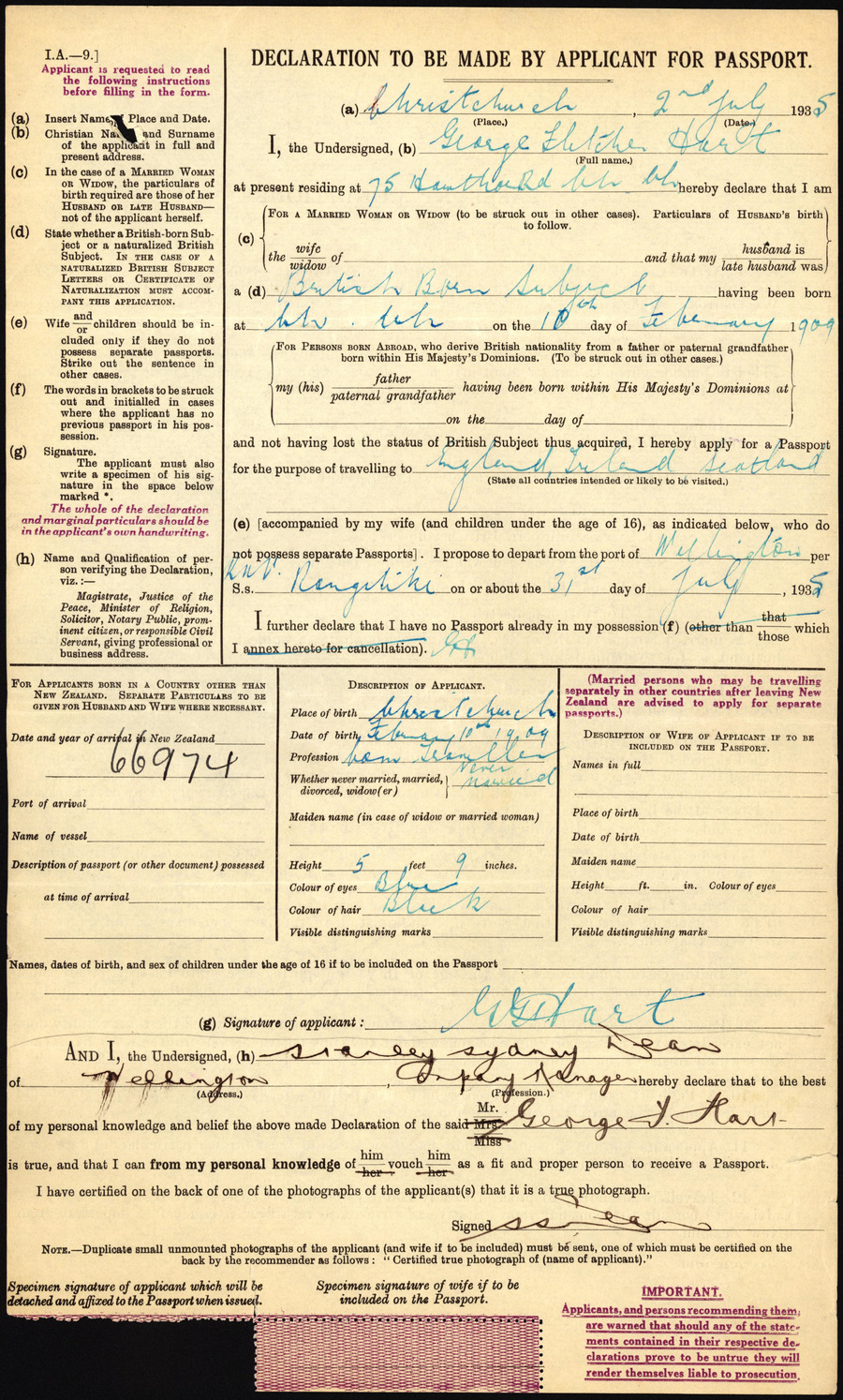
George Fletcher Hart passport application (1935)

George Fletcher Hart (10 February 1909 – 3 June 1944) was a New Zealand rugby union player. A wing three-quarter, Hart represented Canterbury at a provincial level, and was a member of the New Zealand national side, the All Blacks, from 1930 to 1936. He played 35 matches for the All Blacks including 11 internationals, scoring a total of 28 tries.

Educated at Waitaki Boys' High School, where he played in the 1st XV rugby team in 1924 and 1925, Hart was the 1931 New Zealand national 100 yards champion, in a time of 10.4 seconds, although he finished second behind American athlete, George Simpson.

He was selected by the editors of the 1935 Rugby Almanac of New Zealand as one of their 5 players of the year in 1934.

He married Maisie Chambers Harris of Christchurch on 1 April 1937.

Hart served in the 2nd New Zealand Expeditionary Force in World War II, rising to the rank of captain in the 20th Armoured Regiment. He was killed by a shell on 3 June 1944 during the advance towards Rome after the Battle of Monte Cassino, and was buried at Cassino War Cemetery.
