= Bert Geddes =

New Zealand rugby union player (1907–1990)

- Full name: John Herbert Geddes
- Born: 9 January 1907 Invercargill, New Zealand
- Died: 16 August 1990 (aged 83) Invercargill, New Zealand
- Height: 173 cm (5 ft 8 in)

Rugby union career
- Position: Wing
Provincial / State sides
Years	Team	Apps	(Points)
1926–34	Southland	42	(32 t)
International career
Years	Team	Apps	(Points)
1929	New Zealand	1	(0)

John Herbert Geddes (9 January 1907 – 16 August 1990) was a New Zealand international rugby union player.

Geddes was born in Invercargill and educated at Southland Boys' High School.

Possessing considerable pace, Geddes won an Otago sprint title and had a personal best in the 100 yards of 10 seconds even, making him well suited to playing wing three-quarter, although he was often let down by his ball handling.

Geddes, a consistent try-scorer with Southland, won All Blacks selection for the 1929 tour of Australia. He gained his only All Blacks cap in the first Test against the Wallabies in Sydney, with Hawke's Bay winger Bert Grenside preferred for the remaining internationals. He scored seven tries across the tour, including a hat-trick against Newcastle. There were suggestions of nepotism with his selection for the tour, as his father Arthur served on the selection panel.

== See also ==
- List of New Zealand national rugby union players
