= Arthur Collins (rugby union) =

- Born: Arthur Harold Collins; 19 July 1906 Stratford
- Died: 11 January 1988 (aged 81) Waitara
- Height: 1.7 m (5 ft 7 in)
- Weight: 73 kg (161 lb)

Rugby union career
- Position: Fullback
International career
Years	Team	Apps	(Points)
1932–1934	New Zealand	15	(110)

Arthur Harold Collins, fullback for the All Blacks (1932, 1934) and for Taranaki (1927–1937), was born in Stratford, New Zealand on 19 July 1906. Weighing in at just 73 kg, and only 1.70m in height, Collins made a name for himself playing club rugby for Stratford and Clifton, and in 1927 was selected for the Taranaki Rugby Football team. He went on to make 81 appearances for Taranaki over the next eleven years, building a reputation as "a reliable last line of defence and an accurate goalkicker".”

By 1932 Collins had caught the attention of the national selectors, making the North Island side for the North vs South match. He was selected for the All Black team to tour Australia, first donning the All Black jersey on 15 June in a preparation game against Wellington. Collins missed selection for the first test match, which was lost 21–17, but took over for the second in Brisbane on 16 July in which he contributed a penalty goal to New Zealand's 21–3 victory. He went on to play the third test match in Sydney which New Zealand also won. His overall tour performance was considered "creditable", scoring 54 points in his nine matches and kicking a penalty and two conversions in his two tests.

No test matches were played in 1933, and Collins was again selected in 1934 for the tour to Australia. He played the first test in Sydney where the All Blacks were beaten 25–11. Collins could not play the second test due to injury, but played in the All Blacks vs "Rest of New Zealand" match when the team returned from Australia. This was his last game in the All Black jersey, having in those two years played 15 matches and scored 110 points.

Collins retired from representative rugby football in 1937, and went on to serve as a coach and an administrator for Clifton Club, being honoured with life membership in 1970. A son, Bruce, played seven matches for Taranaki as a forward in 1962–63. Collins died on 11 January 1988, in Waitara.

== Bibliography ==
Chester, R.H. & McMillan N.A.C. (1994). Men in Black (2nd ed.). Moa Beckett Publishers Ltd, Auckland.
