= Hubert McLean =

Hugh McLean
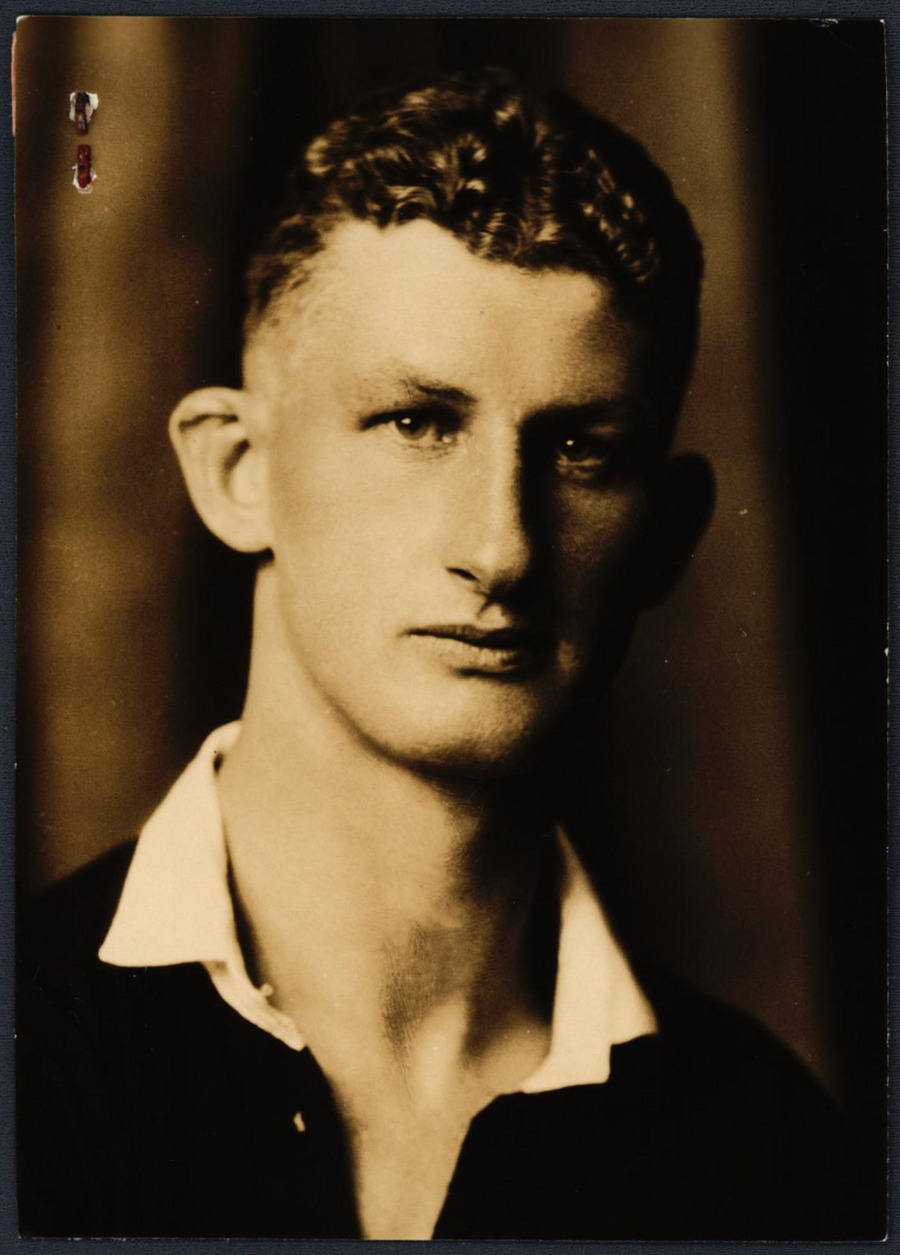
- Foster in 1935
- Born: Hubert Foster McLean; 18 July 1907 Wanganui, New Zealand
- Died: 24 April 1997 (aged 89) Auckland, New Zealand
- Height: 1.89 m (6 ft 2 in)
- Weight: 89 kg (14 st 0 lb)

Rugby union career
- Position: Loose forward
Provincial / State sides
Years	Team	Apps	(Points)
- Wellington, Auckland
International career
Years	Team	Apps	(Points)
1930–1936	New Zealand	9	(9)

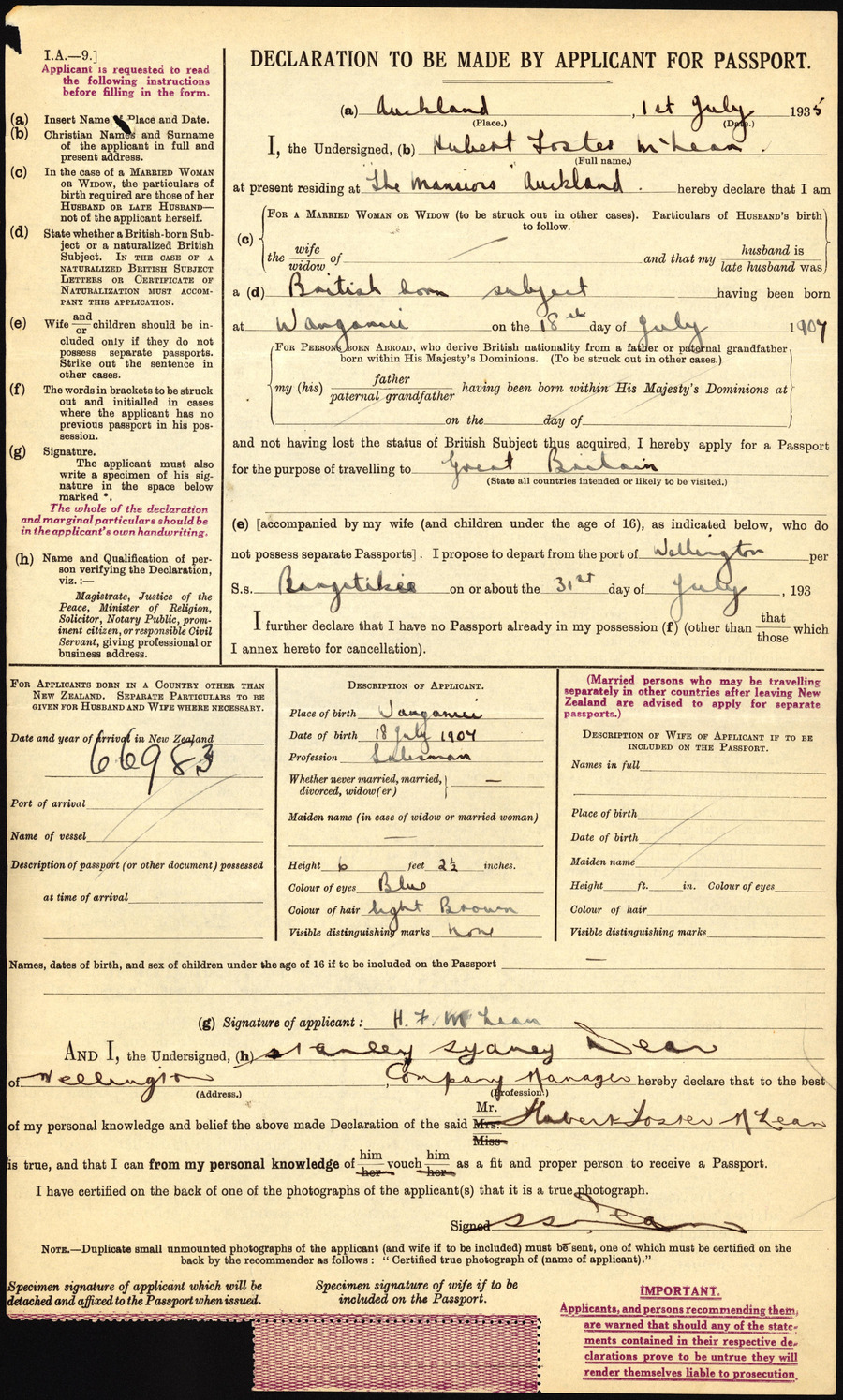
Hubert Foster Mclean passport application (1935)

Hubert Foster McLean (18 July 1907 – 24 April 1997), known as Hugh McLean, was a New Zealand rugby union player who played for the All Blacks between 1930 and 1936.

He was educated at Hastings Boys' High School and Napier Boys' High School where he was in the 1st XV in 1923. He played in Hastings and then Wellington where he made his first class debut. He debuted for the All Blacks in 1930 in two tests. He toured Australia in 1932 and 1934, and his 14 games with the 1935-36 All Blacks included the Irish, Welsh and English internationals. He represented New Zealand in 29 matches including 9 tests; with 50 points for New Zealand (16 tries, conversion) including 9 test points (3 tries).

He was included in a New Zealand rowing eight to go to the 1928 Olympics, but the team was unable to go to the games because of lack of funds.

He served as an officer with the 2nd New Zealand Expeditionary Force (2NZEF) during World War II.

With Ronald Bush he was one of the founders of the New Zealand Barbarians in 1937, and captained their first game against Auckland in 1938.

He came from a rugby family, one brother was the journalist and author Terry McLean (T.P.). He was born in Wanganui and died in Auckland.
