= Frederick Vorrath =

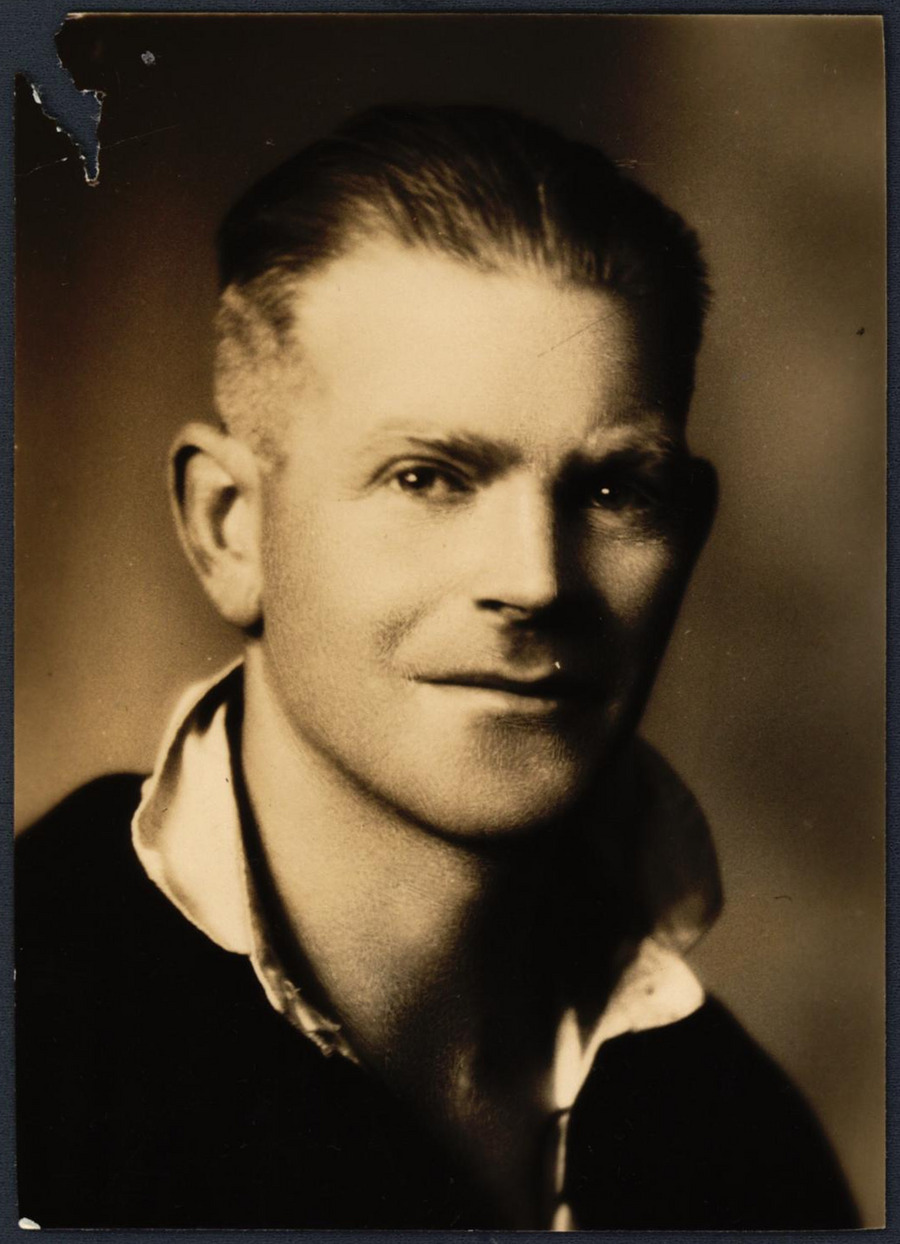
- Born: 13 June 1908 Dunedin
- Died: 2 July 1972 (aged 64) Dunedin
- Height: 1.83 m (6 ft 0 in)
- Weight: 89 kg (196 lb)

Rugby union career
- Position: Utility forward
International career
Years	Team	Apps	(Points)
1935	New Zealand	12	(6)

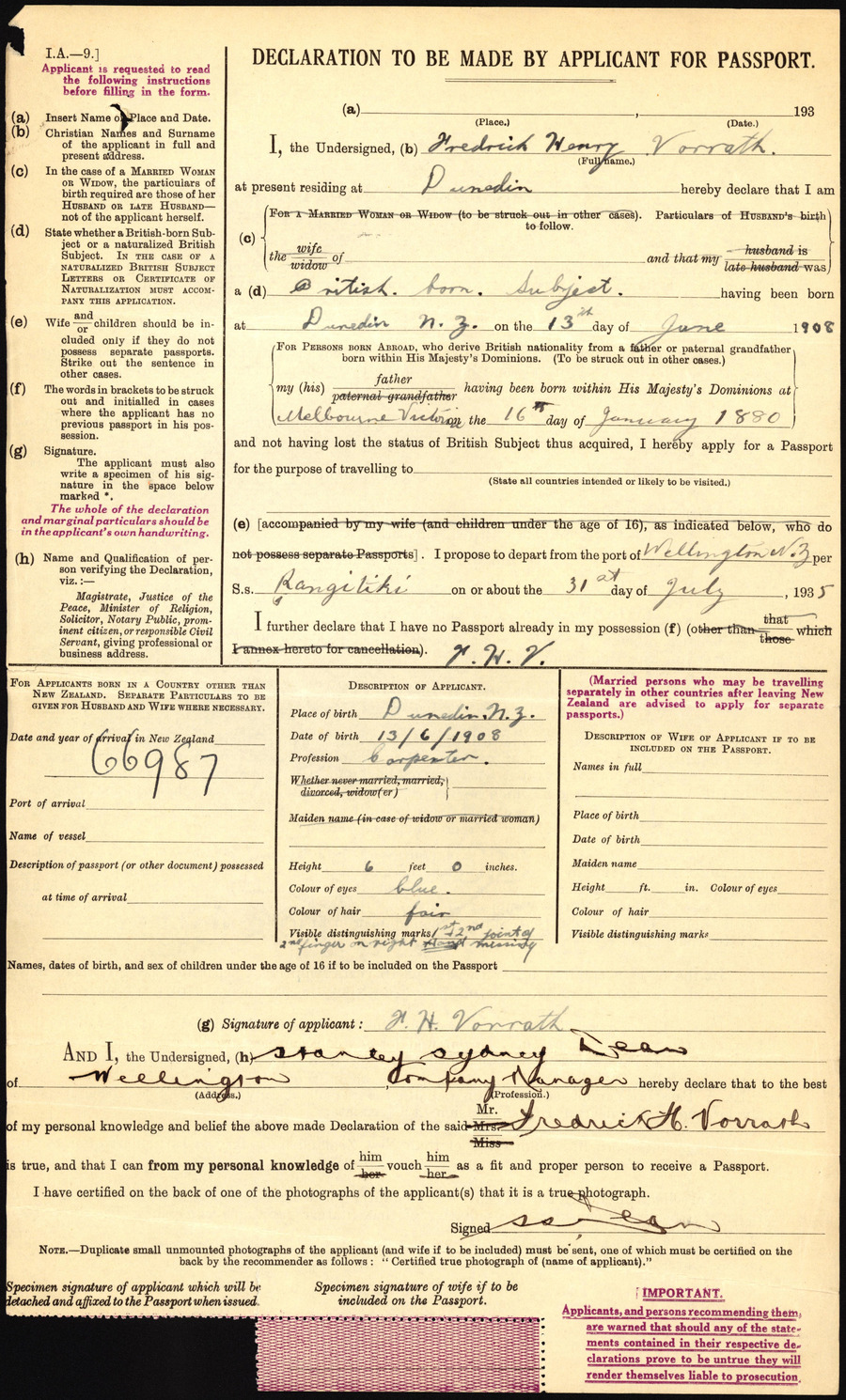
Frederick Henry Vorrath passport application (1935)

Frederick Henry "Did" Vorrath (13 June 1908 – 2 July 1972) played 12 rugby union matches for the All Blacks in 1935 but no tests. He was born and died in Dunedin and was a builder by trade.
