= Jim Watt (rugby union) =

NZ international rugby union player

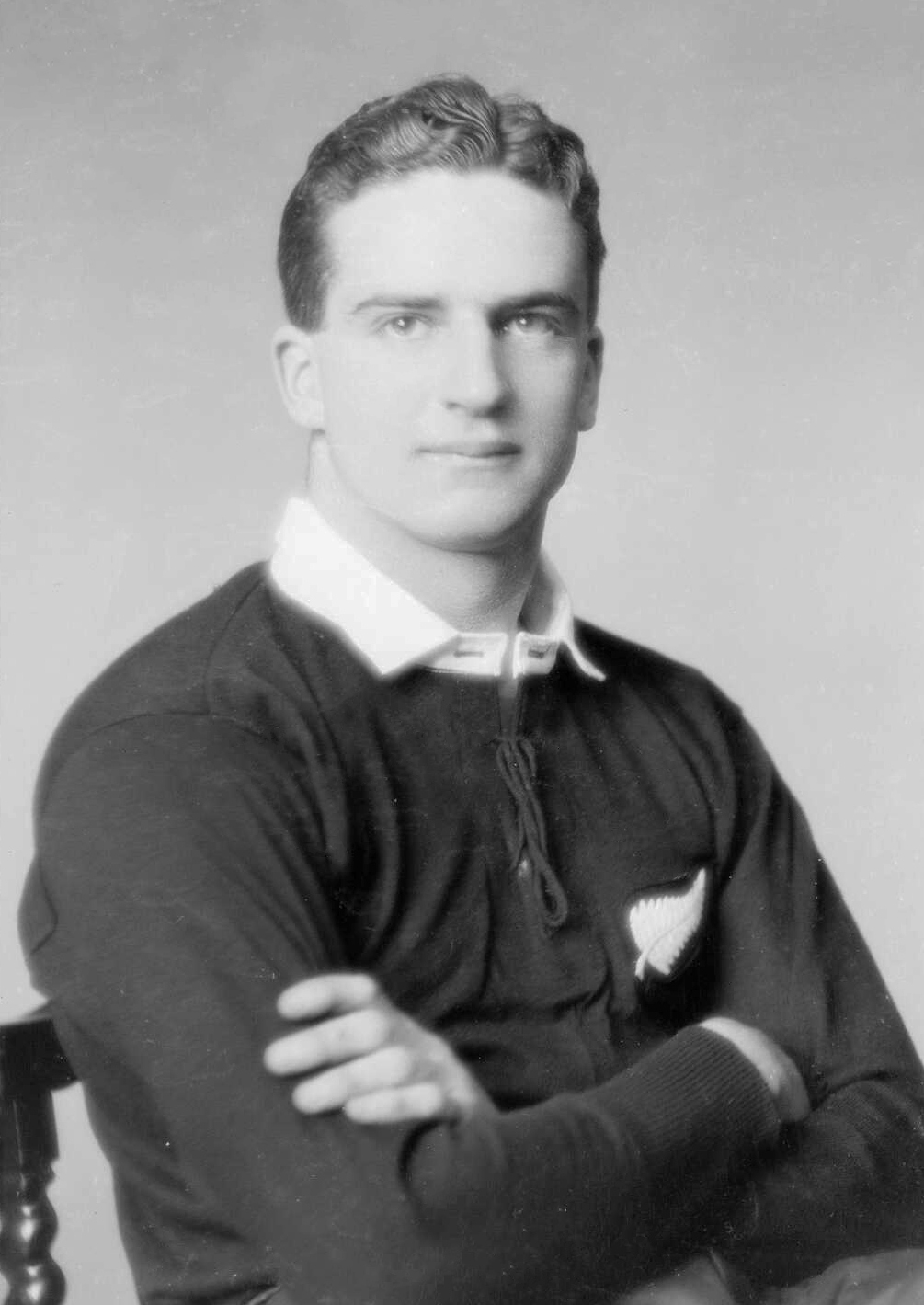
- Watt in 1936
- Born: James Michael Watt; 5 July 1914 Dunedin, New Zealand
- Died: 17 September 1988 (aged 74) Auckland, New Zealand
- Height: 1.78 m (5 ft 10 in)
- Weight: 79 kg (174 lb)
- School: Wellington College
- University: University of Otago
- Notable relative(s): Michael Watt (father); Colin McCahon (cousin)
- Occupation: Professor of paediatrics

Rugby union career
- Position: Wing
Provincial / State sides
| Years | Team | Apps | (Points) |
| 1935–36 | Otago | | |
| 1937 | Wellington | 1 | |
International career
| Years | Team | Apps | (Points) |
| 1936 | New Zealand | 2 | (6) |
| 1936 | NZ Universities | | |

James Michael Watt (5 July 1914 – 17 September 1988) was a New Zealand rugby union player and medical academic. He was New Zealand's first professor of paediatrics, appointed at the University of Otago in 1967.

== Early life and family ==
Born in Dunedin in 1914, Watt was the son of Mary Roberta Watt (née McCahon), an aunt of the artist Colin McCahon, and her husband Michael Herbert Watt, a general practitioner and later a public health administrator. He was educated at Wellesley College and then Wellington College, where he was the athletics champion, a member of the 1st XV rugby team and head prefect. After a year at Victoria University College, Watt studied medicine at the University of Otago, graduating MB ChB in 1937. While at university, he won the New Zealand universities 440 yards athletics title every year from 1934 to 1937. Following graduation, Watt worked at Wellington Hospital for two years as a house surgeon.

== Rugby union ==
A wing three-quarter, Watt represented Otago at a provincial level, and was a member of the New Zealand national side, the All Blacks, in 1936. He played two matches for the All Blacks that year, both of them tests against the touring Australian team. Also in 1936 he played for New Zealand Universities.

== World War II ==
Volunteering for military service, Watt was commissioned as a lieutenant in June 1939 and posted to the 2nd Field Ambulance, New Zealand Medical Corps. In 1940 he was the medical officer at the Waiouru Military Camp, and later that year he was sent overseas with the 3rd Echelon, 2nd New Zealand Expeditionary Force, and served for four years in North Africa and Italy. Mentioned in despatches, he returned to New Zealand in 1944.

== Medical career ==
In 1944, Watt became a general practitioner in Lower Hutt, and became interested in paediatrics. in 1948 he undertook postgraduate study at the Great Ormond Street Hospital in London, and gained a Diploma in Child Health and membership of the Royal College of Physicians. Returning to New Zealand, he was appointed head of the children's ward at Hutt Hospital, and in 1963 he became a visiting staff member at Wellington Hospital. In 1967, a paediatrics department was established at the University of Otago, and Watt was named as its inaugural professor, the first such position in New Zealand. He also served as a university representative on the Otago Hospital Board between 1973 and 1977. He retired from the university in 1977, having developed cardiovascular problems. He died in Auckland in 1988.

Watt was elected a Fellow of the Royal Australasian College of Physicians in 1968, and a Fellow of the Royal College of Physicians the following year.
