= Harry Simon (rugby union) =

Harold Simon
- Full name: Harold James Simon
- Born: 7 March 1911 Kingston, New Zealand
- Died: 1 October 1979 (aged 68) Karitane, New Zealand
- Height: 173 cm (5 ft 8 in)
- School: Macandrew Road School

Rugby union career
- Position: Scrum-half
International career
Years	Team	Apps	(Points)
1937	New Zealand	3	(0)

Harold James Simon (7 March 1911 — 1 October 1979) was a New Zealand rugby union international.

Simon, an Otago native, was educated at Macandrew Road School in Dunedin.

A scrum-half, Simon played 46 provincial games for Otago and was capped three times by the All Blacks. He gained his All Blacks call up as an injury replacement for Joey Sadler, in the side to face the touring 1937 Springboks. His teammate at the Southern club Dave Trevathan was selected as his half-back partner and they played together in all three of the Test matches. He shouldered some of the blame for a 1–2 series loss and never got another international opportunity.

Simon was the son-in-law of All Black Alfred Eckhold, marrying his daughter Hilda in 1938.

== See also ==
- List of New Zealand national rugby union players
