= Tom Morrison (rugby union) =

Tom Morrison CBE
- Born: Thomas Clarence Morrison; 28 July 1913 Gisborne, New Zealand
- Died: 31 August 1985 (aged 72) Wellington, New Zealand
- Height: 1.80 m (5 ft 11 in)
- Weight: 79 kg (174 lb)
- Occupation: Menswear retailer

Rugby union career
- Position: Wing
Provincial / State sides
Years	Team	Apps	(Points)
1931–39	South Canterbury	43	
1944–46	Wellington	14	
International career
Years	Team	Apps	(Points)
1938	New Zealand	3	(4)

Thomas Clarence Morrison CBE (28 July 1913 – 31 August 1985) was a New Zealand rugby union player and administrator. A wing three-quarter, Morrison represented South Canterbury and Wellington at a provincial level. He was a member of the New Zealand national side, the All Blacks, on their 1938 tour of Australia, playing in five matches including three internationals.

During World War II Morrison served with the 27th (Machine Gun) Battalion, enlisting as a corporal in 1939. In February 1942 he was commissioned as a second lieutenant.

After returning from his war service, Morrison played for Wellington between 1944 and 1946 and the North Island in 1944-45. He was selected as one of the 5 players of the year for the 1945 season in the Rugby Almananac of New Zealand.

He later served on the executive of the New Zealand Rugby Union from 1946 to 1968, and was its chairman between 1962 and 1968. He was also a national selector between 1950 and 1956.

In the 1968 New Year Honours, Morrison was appointed a Commander of the Order of the British Empire, for services to sport, especially rugby football. He died on 31 August 1985 and his ashes were buried in Makara Cemetery, Wellington.

Sporting positions
Preceded by Alex McDonald	All Blacks coach 2012–2019	Succeeded by Len Clode
