= Ron Ward (rugby union) =

New Zealand rugby union player

- Born: Ronald Henry Ward; 1 December 1915 Riverton, New Zealand
- Died: 1 August 2000 (aged 84) Invercargill, New Zealand
- Height: 1.85 m (6 ft 1 in)
- Weight: 90 kg (198 lb)
- School: Winton District High School

Rugby union career
- Position: Flanker
Provincial / State sides
Years	Team	Apps	(Points)
1935–1937, 1939	Southland	33	
1938	Hawke's Bay	10	
1941	Canterbury	1	
International career
Years	Team	Apps	(Points)
1936–1937	New Zealand	3	(0)
Coaching career
- Years: Team
- 1957–1961: Southland

Ronald Henry Ward (1 December 1915 – 1 August 2000) was a New Zealand rugby union player. A flanker, Clark represented Southland, Hawke's Bay and, briefly, Canterbury at a provincial level. He was a member of the New Zealand national side, the All Blacks, in 1936 and 1937, playing four matches for the team including three internationals. Ward's playing career was effectively truncated by World War II, but between 1957 and 1961 he was coach and selector of the Southland team.
