= Dick Steere (rugby union) =

New Zealand rugby union player

- Born: Edward Richard George Steere; 10 July 1908 Raetihi, New Zealand
- Died: 1 June 1967 (aged 58) Lower Hutt, New Zealand
- Height: 1.80 m (5 ft 11 in)
- Weight: 91 kg (201 lb)
- School: Napier Boys' High School

Rugby union career
- Position: Lock
Provincial / State sides
Years	Team	Apps	(Points)
- Hawke's Bay
International career
Years	Team	Apps	(Points)
1928–1932	New Zealand	6	(0)

Edward Richard George Steere (10 July 1908 – 1 June 1967) was a New Zealand rugby union player. A lock, Steere represented Hawke's Bay at a provincial level, and was a member of the New Zealand national side, the All Blacks, between 1928 and 1932. He played 21 matches for the All Blacks including six internationals, and captained the team in two matches on their 1932 tour of Australia. He scored one try for New Zealand, against Newcastle at Newcastle on the 1932 tour.

Steere was also known as a sprinter and shot putter, and finished second in the shot put at the 1934 New Zealand athletics championships. He married Bessie Owen on 17 August 1936, at St John's Church, Napier.
