= Canterbury Rugby Football Union =

Governing body for rugby union in New Zealand

- Sport: Rugby union
- Jurisdiction: Canterbury region
- Abbreviation: CRFU
- Founded: 1879; 147 years ago
- Affiliation: New Zealand Rugby
- Headquarters: Christchurch
- President: Julie Patterson
- Vice president: Don Hayes

Official website
- www.crfu.co.nz
- (New Zealand)

The Canterbury Rugby Football Union (which is also referred to as Canterbury or CRFU) is the governing body for rugby union in a portion of the Canterbury region of New Zealand, and runs the Canterbury representative team. The Canterbury team has won the National Provincial Championship, Air New Zealand Cup, and the ITM Cup 14 times including a "six-peat" from 2008 to 2013 – with five in the National Provincial Championship, two in the Air New Zealand Cup, five in the ITM Cup and one in the Mitre 10 Cup. Their most recent victory was the 2017 Mitre 10 Cup. Canterbury also acts as a primary feeder to the Crusaders, who play in the Super Rugby competition.

The union also administers all club rugby within the region, including senior club rugby and school rugby. Canterbury has produced the most All Blacks of any New Zealand region, with Scott Barrett becoming Canterbury's 200th All Black in 2016.

== History ==
=== Early history (1879–1975) ===
The Canterbury Rugby Football Union (CRFU) was established in 1879, following a match between South Canterbury and North Canterbury in Timaru. It took place on 26 July 1879, where delegates representing Christchurch, Christ's College, Temuka, North Canterbury (Rangiora), Eastern (Christchurch), South Canterbury (Timaru), Ashburton, and Southbridge clubs decided to form the union. Montague Lewin was most responsible for the Union's formation; he had emigrated from England to Christchurch in 1873, and lobbied for local football clubs to adopt the rules of England's Rugby Football Union. He succeeded in getting Canterbury clubs to adopt the rugby rules in 1876, but a visit by an Australian Victorian Rules football team in 1879 prompted him to push for the formation of a union. The new organisation was initially proposed as the New Zealand Rugby Union, but ultimately formed as the Canterbury Rugby Football Union. Canterbury was the first provincial union within New Zealand, with the Wellington Rugby Football Union being formed later that year. By 1890, fourteen provincial unions had been founded within New Zealand. As well as being the oldest union in New Zealand, the CRFU was founded before one of the Home Unions (the Welsh Rugby Union, founded in 1881).

A Canterbury representative side had played before the formation of the CRFU, but the first provincial game in New Zealand played under the authority of provincial unions took place on 27 August 1881. Canterbury hosted an Otago side that triumphed by a try-to nil. The first rugby match at Lancaster Park was played the following year, which served as the Union's home until the 2011 Christchurch earthquake.

In 1888 the South Canterbury clubs broke off to form the South Canterbury Rugby Union – comprising Timaru, Fairlie Creek, Geraldine, Temuka, Waimate, Winchester, and Timaru Pirate clubs – only a few years before the formation of the New Zealand Rugby Football Union (later shortened to New Zealand Rugby Union, or NZRU) in 1892. The CRFU had originally voted to join the NZRU in 1891, but when the time came to ratify the agreement in 1892, they resisted following reluctance from their members. Along with the Otago and Southland provinces, the CRFU objected to the requirement that NZRU executive committee members reside in Wellington. South Canterbury had joined the NZRU, and the provinces' representative sides did not meet in 1893. Players from Canterbury were not eligible for selection in the 1893 New Zealand team that toured Australia. The CRFU eventually relented, and in 1894 joined the NZRU; both Otago and Southland joined the following year. When New South Wales toured New Zealand in 1894, Canterbury players were now eligible for selection for New Zealand, and the CRFU hosted the only game between the sides which was played at Lancaster Park.

In 1904, a sub-union of the South Canterbury Rugby Union was formed around the Ashburton area – the Ashburton Country Rugby Union. In 1905 it came under the umbrella of the CRFU, but split away to become completely independent in 1927. It was renamed the Mid Canterbury Rugby Football Union in 1952.

== Provincial rugby ==
=== Honours ===
- NPC/Air New Zealand Cup/ITM Cup/Mitre 10 Cup (14):

1977, 1983, 1997, 2001, 2004, 2008, 2009, 2010, 2011, 2012, 2013, 2015, 2016, 2017

- Ranfurly Shield

1927–28 (1), 1931–34 (15), 1935 (4), 1950 (0), 1953–56 (23), 1969–71 (9), 1972–73 (2), 1982–85 (25), 1994–95 (9), 2000–03 (23), 2004–06 (14), 2007 (1), 2009 (4), 2010–11 (2), 2016–17 (7).

=== National Provincial Championship (1976–2005) ===
The National Provincial Championship was founded in 1976, becoming the premier national rugby competition. The NPC did not have playoffs, with the Championship awarded to the team with the best record. Canterbury had immediate success in the competition, going undefeated in 1977 to win the title. Canterbury had mixed results for the next five years, finishing between 2nd and 9th during this period. In 1983 Canterbury won their second title, once again going undefeated.

Canterbury teams did not win the title again until 1997. All Black-laden Auckland teams outperformed Canterbury, claiming 10 titles from 1984 to 1996. The 1984 and 1989 Canterbury teams had a record of 8 wins, 1 draw and 1 loss, and finished second to Auckland.

In 1992, the National Provincial Championship established playoffs, with the top four sides playing in a knockout format. In 1992 and 1993 Canterbury missed the playoffs. In 1994, Canterbury placed 3rd during the regular season. Canterbury travelled to North Harbour for the semi-final. Canterbury lost 27–59 to North Harbour. In 1995, Canterbury missed the playoffs again. Canterbury began to see the development of important players such as Andrew Mehrtens, Todd Blackadder, and Reuben Thorne. Despite losing three of the first four games Canterbury rebounded to finish 3rd in 1996. However, Canterbury went on to lose away to Counties Manukau 33–46 in the semi-final. In the 1997 season, Canterbury broke their championship drought, winning their third title. Canterbury posted a record of 8 wins and 2 losses, enough to finish 2nd in the round-robin. Canterbury defeated Auckland 21–15 in the semi-final. Canterbury also hosted the final owing to Counties Manukau, upsetting Waikato 43–40 in the other semi-final. Canterbury defeated Counties Manukau 44–13 in the final.

In 1998, Canterbury finished 3rd in the round robin, with a record of 6 wins and 4 losses. Canterbury travelled to Hamilton to play Waikato in the semi-final. Canterbury lost 13–32 to Waikato in the semi-final. The 1999 season saw Canterbury missing the playoffs, finishing 5th. Canterbury had a record of 5 wins and 4 losses. In 2000, Canterbury finished 1st in the round robin with a record of 8 wins and 1 loss. Canterbury defeated Taranaki 31–23 in the semi-final. Canterbury lost the final to Wellington 29–34 in Christchurch. In 2001, Canterbury won their fourth title. Canterbury posted a record of 9 wins and 1 loss, finishing 1st in the round-robin. Canterbury defeated Auckland in the semi-final 53–22. Canterbury hosted Otago in the final, defeating Otago 30–19.

In 2002, Canterbury finished 2nd in the round robin, with a record of 7 wins and 2 losses. Canterbury hosted Auckland in the semi-final. However, Auckland beat Canterbury 23–29 in the semi-final. In the 2003 season, Canterbury did not qualify for the playoffs, posting a record of 5 wins, 1 draw, and 3 losses. The 2003 season is currently the last time Canterbury has missed the playoffs. In 2004, Canterbury won its fifth title, defeating Wellington in the final. Canterbury finished 2nd in the round-robin after posting a record of 6 wins, 1 draw, and 2 losses. Canterbury hosted Bay of Plenty in Christchurch. Canterbury defeated Bay of Plenty 44–12 in the semi-final. Wellington hosted the final against Canterbury. Canterbury defeated Wellington 40–27 in the final, with Justin Marshall scoring two tries.

2005 was the last season of the National Provincial Championship before becoming the Air New Zealand Cup. Canterbury finished 1st in the round robin, posting a record of 7 wins, 1 draw, and 1 loss. Canterbury hosted Otago in the semi-final, in the Battle of the South Island. Otago beat Canterbury 22–37, ending Canterbury's season.

=== Air New Zealand Cup (2006–2009) ===
In 2006, the National Provincial Championship became the Air New Zealand Cup, as Air New Zealand airline company became the principal sponsor of the tournament and earned naming rights. The 2006 season was not very successful for Canterbury, posting a record of 6 wins and 3 losses, placing Canterbury 5th in the Top Six division. Canterbury would have to travel to Wellington for the quarter-final. Wellington defeated Canterbury 23–36 in the quarter-final. In 2007, Canterbury finished 2nd in the round robin, behind the undefeated Auckland. Canterbury hosted Wellington in the semi-final, with Canterbury losing 21–26.

The 2008 season began a period of consistent performance for Canterbury. Canterbury recorded 9 wins and 1 loss, to finish 2nd behind Wellington. Canterbury hosted Tasman in the quarter-final. Canterbury beat Tasman 48–10. In the semi-final Canterbury hosted Hawke's Bay, defeating Hawke's Bay 31–21. For the final, Canterbury travelled to Wellington to face the top seed, Wellington. In a low-scoring final, Canterbury won 7–6, earning its first Air New Zealand Cup title and sixth title overall.

The 2009 season continued Canterbury's success. In the round robin, Canterbury finished 1st after posting a record of 10 wins and 3 losses. Canterbury hosted Hawke's Bay, the best-attacking team in the competition. Canterbury defeated Hawke's Bay 20–3 in the semi-final. Canterbury faced Wellington again in the final, winning with a penalty in the 78th minute, 28–20. For the first time, Canterbury won titles back to back.

=== ITM Cup (2010–2015) ===
In 2010, the Air New Zealand Cup became the ITM Cup, as ITM gained the naming rights after becoming the principal sponsor. Canterbury tied Auckland with 45 points during the round-robin but managed to top the table after having a better points differential than Auckland. Canterbury hosted the semi-final against Wellington. In a high-scoring match, Canterbury beat Wellington 57–41. Canterbury faced Waikato, the 3rd seed, after Waikato upset Auckland 38–37 in the other semi-final. Canterbury defeated Waikato in the final 33–13. Canterbury earned its first ITM Cup title and eighth title overall. Canterbury achieved its first three-peat, the second province (after Auckland) to accomplish this.

In 2011, the ITM hosted no semi-finals, making room for the World Cup. As a result, only the top two sides would qualify for a final. Canterbury posted a record of 6 wins and 4 losses, finishing as the 2nd seed. Despite Taranaki having 7 wins and 3 losses, Canterbury qualified because it had more competition points (33) than Taranaki (31). Canterbury travelled to Hamilton to face Waikato in the final for the second time in two years. Canterbury defeated Waikato 12–3, with both teams scoring only through penalties. Canterbury earned its ninth title and equalled Auckland's feat of a fourpeat.

In the 2012 season, Canterbury tied with Wellington on 39 competition points; but finished top of the table due to a better points differential. Canterbury faced Taranaki in the semi-final. Despite Taranaki being expected to win easily, , at full-time the score was tied at 27–27, forcing extra-time. In extra-time, Canterbury took a 51–27 victory. Canterbury hosted Auckland in the 2012 final, beating the Auckland team 31–18. Canterbury became the first team to win five titles in a row and earned its tenth title.

In 2013, Canterbury became the first team to win six titles in a row. Canterbury finished 2nd in the round robin behind Wellington, after posting a record of 8 wins and 2 losses. Canterbury hosted Auckland in the semi-final. In an offensive game, Canterbury beat Auckland 56–26. Canterbury faced Wellington away in the final, winning 29–13.

In 2014, Canterbury's streak came to an end. Canterbury posted a record of 7 wins and 3 losses, finishing 3rd in the round-robin, then losing to Tasman in Nelson, 6–26.

In the 2015 season, Canterbury won its twelfth title. Canterbury finished top of the table, recording 9 wins and 1 loss, then beat Taranaki in the semi-final, 46–20. Canterbury hosted old foes Auckland in the final. In a closely fought match, Canterbury prevailed 25–23.

=== Mitre 10 Cup (2016–2021) ===
In 2016, the ITM Cup was renamed to the Mitre 10 Cup, as Mitre 10 became the principal sponsor, gaining the naming rights. Canterbury finished top of the table after posting a record of 8 wins and 2 losses. Canterbury hosted fourth-seed Counties Manukau in the semi-final. Canterbury defeated Counties Manukau 22–7. Canterbury then faced Tasman in the 2016 final. Canterbury defeated Tasman comfortably 43–27, going back to back and earning a thirteenth title.

In the 2017, Mitre 10 Cup season, Canterbury finished second in the round robin after posting a record of 8 wins and 2 losses. Canterbury performed well throughout the season but was defeated heavily on two occasions. Canterbury lost 14–60 to Wellington in week 5 and 43–55 to Taranaki in week 9. Canterbury won the other 8 games by an average margin of 32 points. Canterbury also lost the Ranfurly Shield to Taranaki. Canterbury Captain Tim Bateman stated after the game only winning the competition would help alleviate the loss of the shield. Canterbury hosted a resurgent North Harbor for the first semi-final. North Harbor had won promotion from the Championship the year earlier. Canterbury defeated North Harbor 35–24, advancing to the final. Tasman upset the table-topping Taranaki in the other semi-final 30–29. As a result, the final would be hosted in Christchurch between Canterbury and Tasman. Canterbury defeated Tasman 35–13, sealing the match with a try in the 77th minute. Canterbury won its fourteenth title overall and ninth title in ten years.

In 2018, they opened with a 25–17 loss to Tasman, beat Wellington (27–20), Bay of Plenty (19–31), Manawatu (34–23), and North Harbour (21–31). But it all came to an end with a 29–34 loss to Auckland but started again with a 25–47 win over Otago, They beat Hawke's Bay (49–24), Taranaki (41–7) and Counties Manukau (14–19) to finish 3rd on the table, behind Auckland and Tasman. In the semi-finals, they were hosted by second-place Tasman, winning 16–21 in the 76th minute. The game was considered a deserved, but controversially won match by Canterbury. They played Auckland in the final, away again. Despite looking to go for an easy win, they were held in the second half, the match ending 26–26. The match went into extra time, where they lost 40–33, ending their perfect finals attendance.

=== Season standings ===
Championship

Season	Pos	Pld	W	D	L	PF	PA	±	BP	Pts	Notes
1976	4th	10	6	0	4	153	118	+35		12	
1977	1st	10	10	0	0	190	81	+109		20	Champions
1978	3rd	10	6	0	4	152	144	+8		12	
1979	4th	10	7	0	3	146	115	+31		14	
1980	7th	10	4	0	4	165	161	+4		8	
1981	9th	10	4	0	6	128	165	−37		8	
1982	2nd	10	7	1	2	219	132	+87		15	
1983	1st	10	10	0	0	295	109	+186		20	Champions
1984	2nd	10	8	1	1	214	128	+86		17	
1985	2nd	10	7	1	2	240	109	+131		15	
1986	3rd	10	7	1	2	282	153	+129		15	
1987	5th	10	5	0	5	201	183	+18		10	
1988	6th	10	5	0	5	180	197	−17		10	
1989	2nd	10	8	1	1	287	168	+119		17	
1990	4th	10	6	0	4	207	205	+2		12	
1991	4th	10	6	1	3	252	241	+11		13	
1992	7th	8	2	0	6	197	198	−1			
1993	6th	8	4	0	4	188	235	−47			
1994	3rd	9	6	0	3	257	253	+4			Lost to North Harbour Semi-Final
1995	5th	8	4	1	3	259	232	+27			
1996	3rd	9	5	0	4	273	239	+34			Lost to Counties Manukau Semi-final
1997	2nd	10	8	0	2	324	165	+159			Defeated Counties Manukau in Final
1998	3rd	10	6	0	4	348	260	+88			Lost to Waikato in semi-final
1999	5th	9	5	0	4	240	162	+78			
2000	1st	9	8	0	1	307	255	+152	6	38	Lost to Wellington in Final
2001	1st	10	9	0	1	407	164	+243	8	53	Defeated Otago in Final
2002	2nd	9	7	0	2	337	215	+122	2	34	Lost to Auckland in semi-final
2003	7th	9	5	1	3	257	254	+3	2	24	
2004	2nd	9	6	1	2	346	207	+139	6	32	Defeated Wellington in Final
2005	1st	9	7	1	1	234	138	+94	5	35	Lost to Otago in semi-final
2006	5th	9	6	0	3	238	156	+82	5	29	Lost to Wellington in quarter-final
2007	2nd	10	9	0	1	351	135	+216	6	42	Lost to Wellington in semi-final
2008	2nd	10	9	0	1	270	101	+169	6	42	Defeated Wellington in Final
2009	1st	13	10	0	3	369	231	+138	7	47	Defeated Wellington in Final
2010	1st	13	9	1	3	372	290	+82	7	45	Defeated Waikato in Final
2011	2nd	10	6	0	4	293	230	+63	9	33	Defeated Waikato in Final
2012	1st	10	8	0	2	419	132	+287	7	39	Defeated Auckland in Final
2013	2nd	10	8	0	2	371	163	+208	8	40	Defeated Wellington in Final
2014	3rd	10	7	0	3	337	205	+205	6	34	Lost to Tasman in semi-final
2015	1st	10	9	0	1	307	177	+130	7	43	Defeated Auckland in Final
2016	1st	10	8	0	2	397	219	+178	8	40	Defeated Tasman in Final
2017	2nd	10	8	0	2	445	246	+199	9	41	Defeated Tasman in Final
2018	3rd	10	8	0	2	325	212	+113	9	41	Lost to Auckland in Final
2019	3rd	10	6	0	4	345	198	+147	11	35	Lost to Wellington in semi-final
2020	5th	10	5	0	5	251	224	+27	9	29	
2021	3rd	9	5	0	4	228	242	−14	8	28	Lost to Waikato in semi-final
2022	1st	10	9	0	1	389	208	+181	10	46	Lost to Wellington in final
2023	3rd	10	6	0	4	351	271	+80	13	37	Lost to Taranaki in semi-final
2024	6th	10	6	0	4	276	294	−18	6	30	Lost to Bay of Plenty in semi-final
2025	1st	10	8	1	1	326	168	+158	8	42	Defeated Otago in Final

=== Ranfurly Shield (1903–present) ===
The Ranfurly Shield was donated by the Uchter Knox, 5th Earl of Ranfurly, the governor of New Zealand (1897–1904). The shield had been designed as a trophy for football (not rugby) and had to be modified to depict a rugby game. The Shield is based on a challenge system, rather than a league or knockout competition as with most football trophies. The holding union must defend the shield in challenge matches, and a successful challenger becomes the new holder of the Shield. It was first awarded to Auckland, which had the best results in the 1903 season. In the first challenge on 6 August 1904, Wellington defeated Auckland 6–3 to lift what has become known colloquially as the Log o' Wood.

Canterbury has a proud history associated with the Ranfurly Shield. Canterbury has 15 Ranfurly Shield wins and 136 defenses, second only to Auckland. Canterbury's first bid for the trophy in its second game in 1904 and challenged for the shield on 11 occasions before it was finally successful for the first time when beating Manawhenua (an amalgamation of the modern-day Manawatu and Horowhenua Kapiti provincial unions) 17–6 at Palmerston North. Canterbury's first shield tenure of any length began in 1931 and ended in 1934 after 15 successful defenses. Between 1953 and 1956 the Cantabs held onto the shield in 23 challenges. In 1973 Marlborough pulled off one of the greatest Ranfurly Shield upsets of all time, by defeating Canterbury 13–6 to begin the region's only shield tenure. Canterbury's greatest shield defence occurred from 1982–1985, with 25 defenses. Canterbury defeated Wellington on 18 September 1982 gaining the Ranfurly Shield for the first time in nine years. Canterbury would defend the shield for a then-record number of 25 times before Auckland would challenge on 14 September 1985. In front of 52,000 fans Auckland started strongly, jumping out to a 24–0 half-time lead. However, Alex Wyllie's Canterbury came back at the last minute when a Robbie Deans kick bounded over the dead ball line. Having held on to win 28–23, Auckland set about creating a new benchmark of 61 consecutive defenses.

Canterbury reclaimed the shield in 1994, defeating Waikato 29–26. Canterbury would have nine successful defenses, before losing the shield to Auckland in 1995. Auckland would shut out Canterbury 35–0. In 2000, Canterbury challenged Waikato, who had successfully defended the shield 21 times. Canterbury defeated Waikato 26–18, winning the shield for the tenth time. Canterbury successfully defended the shield 23 times before losing to Auckland 40–31. However, next year Canterbury got a challenge, as Bay of Plenty took the shield of Auckland. In 2004, Canterbury would challenge Bay of Plenty for the shield. Canterbury won 33–26 over Bay of Plenty. Canterbury mounted 14 successful defenses until Canterbury lost to North Harbour 17–21. On 1 September, Canterbury defeated Waikato 33–20, winning back the shield. However, Canterbury had only one defense of the shield, losing to Auckland 15–26. Just under two years after losing the shield to Auckland, Canterbury regained it, beating Wellington 36–14. Canterbury again were host to a mighty upset as Southland regained the Shield for the fifth time in their history after a 50-year hiatus stretching back to 1959, with Southland winning 3–9. Canterbury got revenge on Southland prevailing in a sold-out game 26–15 in round 11 of the 2010 ITM Cup. Southland received much praise for breathing life back into the shield and for their passionate ownership of the shield. Canterbury would only defend the shield twice before losing to Southland again, 19–22 returning the shield to the south.

In 2016, Canterbury would challenge Waikato for the shield in round 7. The two teams were locked up at 23–23 with only 10 minutes remaining. However, Jordie Barrett kicked two penalties to seal a Canterbury win 29–23, gaining the Ranfurly Shield in the process. Canterbury would defend the shield on 7 occasions before losing to Taranaki 43–55.

=== Rivalry with Auckland ===
Canterbury's greatest rivalry is arguably with Auckland. Canterbury is the largest province in the South Island and Auckland is the largest province in the North Island. Auckland dominated the New Zealand rugby landscape during the late 1980s and early 1990s. However, in subsequent years Canterbury has turned the table.

== Club rugby ==
The Canterbury Union consists of 48 clubs, the most of any other New Zealand Union, split into three sub-unions.

=== Metropolitan club rugby ===
There are 18 clubs in the Metropolitan Sub-Union.

- Belfast RFC
- Burnside RFC
- Christchurch FC
- High School Old Boys RFC
- Hornby RFC
- Linwood RFC
- Lyttelton RFC
- Marist Albion RFC
- Lincoln University RFC
- Merivale RFC
- New Brighton RFC
- Otautahi RFC
- Parklands RFC
- Shirley RFC
- Suburbs RFC
- Sumner RFC
- Sydenham RFC
- University RFC

The Bascik Transport Cup is the premier club competition of the Metropolitan sub-union. There are currently three divisions under the Bascik transport name, as well as a fourth division, a colts, and a classics grade. All formats are similar and the trophies include the Trophy, Plate, and Bowl.

Division One has twelve teams competing in the 2024 competition. Each team plays one another once in a round-robin format that lasts eleven rounds. The top side at the end of the round-robin receives the Bascik Transport Minor Premiership Cup. Following the Cup competition, the teams are divided into three sections (1 VS 4 and 2 VS 3) (5 VS 8 and 6 VS 7) and (9 VS 12 and 10 VS 11), the winning teams from the top 2 matches get a week off, while the losing teams from those matches face the 2 winning teams from the 5th and 6th seed matches.

The Second Division operates under a similar format to Division One, with a full round robin to determine the winner of the Cup, before splitting into two divisions that eventually compete for the Trophy, Plate, and Bowl. The Premier Colts operates under a double round-robin format; the winner is awarded the Cup. The teams are split into three based on their rankings following the double round robin; the top four teams compete for the Trophy in a set of play-off matches. The teams ranked fifth to eighth compete for the Plate.

==== Recent club finals ====
- 2026 - Marist-Albion 29-27 Linwood
- 2025 - Marist-Albion 27-25 Linwood
- 2024 - Linwood 39-32 University of Canterbury
- 2023 - Marist-Albion 31-26 High School Old Boys
- 2022 - Sydenham 23-15 Marist Albion
- 2020 - Lincoln University 30-29 Marist Albion

=== Country club rugby ===
The Country Cup is the premier club competition in the Canterbury Country region. The region includes clubs from the Ellesmere and North Canterbury sub-unions and the Mid Canterbury Rugby Football Union. Players who compete in this tournament are eligible for selection in the Canterbury Country representative team.

It is a 19-team competition with teams divided into two sections, ten teams in section 1 and nine teams in section 2. It is a round-robin format, with every team playing each other once and a bonus points system being used to rank the teams. The top four sides from each section go on to the quarter-finals, and the winners from these go to the semi-finals – the two winners then compete for the Cup in the final.

Ellesmere:
There are 16 clubs in the Ellesmere Sub-Union.

- Banks Peninsula RFC
- Burnham RFC
- Darfield RFC
- Diamond Harbour RFC
- Dunsandel/Irwell RFC
- Kirwee RFC
- Leeston RFC
- Lincoln RFC
- Prebbleton RFC
- Rolleston RFC
- Selwyn RFC
- Sheffield RFC
- Southbridge RFC
- Springston RFC
- Waihora RFC
- West Melton RFC

North Canterbury:
There are 14 clubs in the North Canterbury Sub-Union.

- Hanmer Springs RFC
- Amberley RFC
- Ashley RFC
- Cheviot RFC
- Culverden RFC
- Glenmark RFC
- Kaiapoi RFC
- Hurunui RFC
- Ohoka RFC
- Oxford RFC
- Saracens RFC
- United RFC
- Waiau RFC
- Woodend RFC

==== Recent club finals ====
Luisetti Cup

- 2026 - Glenmark-Cheviot 41-12 Kaiapoi
- 2025 - Waihora 25-23 Ashburton Celtic
- 2024 - Glenmark-Cheviot 41-27 Prebbleton
- 2023 - Ashburton Celtic 19-7 Prebbleton
- 2022 - Glenmark-Cheviot 26-18 Saracens

== Women's Rugby ==
=== Super Rugby Aupiki ===
The Canterbury Union is part of the Matatū which is a New Zealand women's professional rugby union team that competes in the Super Rugby Aupiki competition. Matatū represents the South Island.

The Matatu were crowned the champions of the 2023 Super Rugby Aupiki season.

=== Farah Palmer Cup ===
The Canterbury women's team is part of the Farah Palmer Cup, formerly known as Women's Provincial Championship until 2016. Canterbury were the champions in the following years:

- 2017
- 2018
- 2019
- 2020
- 2022.

== Stadium ==
Historically, Canterbury's main home ground was the 36,000-capacity AMI Stadium in Christchurch, formally known as Lancaster Park. However, it was closed in 2010 due to damage inflicted by the February Christchurch earthquake. With AMI Stadium closed, Canterbury adopted Rugby League Park (known as Apollo Projects Stadium) in Addington as their home ground. The facility was upgraded bringing it to an 18,600 capacity and its facilities to the minimum standards required for the NPC and Super rugby competitions.

It was then decided to construct a new roofed multi-use arena with a capacity of 25,000, providing a world-class venue for rugby and other sports and for entertainment events. On 5 October 2020, New Zealand Prime Minister Jacinda Ardern announced that a funding agreement had been signed with the Christchurch City Council.

On 14 July 2022, the Christchurch City Council voted to sign a $683 million contract to build Te Kaha.

In July 2024, a sponsorship agreement was announced granting the telecommunications company One NZ naming rights to the stadium for the next 10 years. The stadium was named One New Zealand Stadium, for commercial sponsorship reasons.

The stadium opened for events in 2026.

== All Blacks ==
This is a list of players who have represented New Zealand from the Canterbury representative rugby union team. Players are listed by the decade they were first selected in and players in bold are current All Blacks. This list is taken from allblacks.com Statistics.

=== 1880–99 ===
- George Helmore – 1884
- William Millton – 1884
- Edward Millton – 1884
- William Balch – 1894
- Alfred Cooke – 1894
- George Humphreys – 1894
- Harry Frost – 1896
- Sandy Kerr – 1896
- Sydney Orchard – 1896
- Frank Brooker – 1897
- Ernest Glennie – 1897

=== 1900–19 ===
- Morrie Wood – 1901
- Tom Cross – 1901
- Walter Drake – 1901
- Reuben Cooke – 1903
- Duncan McGregor – 1903
- Bernard Fanning – 1903
- Eric Harper – 1904
- Peter Harvey – 1904
- Fred Newton – 1905
- George Gillett – 1905
- Bob Deans – 1905
- Hubert Turtill – 1905
- Frank Fryer – 1907
- Paddy Burns – 1908
- Doddy Gray – 1908
- William Fuller – 1910
- Billy Mitchell – 1910
- Toby Murray – 1913
- Henry Taylor – 1913
- William Cummings – 1913
- Edward Hasell – 1913
- Alfred Fanning – 1913

=== 1920–39 ===
- Cyril Evans – 1921
- William Ford – 1921
- Louis Petersen – 1921
- Frank Smyth – 1922
- Patrick McCarthy – 1923
- Read Masters – 1923
- Ron Stewart – 1923
- Bill Dalley – 1924
- Brian McCleary – 1924
- Neil McGregor – 1924
- Jim Parker – 1924
- Alan Robilliard – 1924
- Bill Elvy – 1925 - 1926
- Jack Harris – 1925
- Archie McCormick – 1925
- Geoff Alley – 1926
- Herb Lilburne – 1928
- George Scrimshaw – 1928
- Sydney Carleton – 1928
- Jim Burrows – 1928
- Frank Clark – 1928
- Charles Oliver – 1928
- George Mehrtens – 1928
- Topi Robinson – 1928
- Curly Page – 1928
- Beau Cottrell – 1929
- George Hart – 1930
- Gordon Innes – 1932
- Jack Manchester – 1932
- Jack Rankin – 1936
- Donald Cobden – 1937
- Jack Hooper – 1937
- Harold Milliken – 1938
- Claude Williams – 1938

=== 1940–59 ===
- Wally Argus – 1946
- Patrick Rhind – 1946
- Fred Hobbs – 1947
- Larry Savage – 1949
- Bob Stuart – 1949
- Garth Bond – 1949
- Bob Duff – 1951
- Tom Lynch – 1951
- Peter Eastgate – 1952
- Allan Elsom – 1952
- John Hotop – 1952
- Kevin Meates – 1952
- Mick Bremner – 1952
- Nelson Dalzell – 1953
- Doug Wilson – 1953
- Morrie Dixon – 1953
- Ross Smith – 1955
- Kevin Stuart – 1955
- John Buxton – 1955
- Tiny Hill – 1955
- Pat Vincent – 1956
- Dennis Young – 1956
- Wilson Whineray – 1957
- Brian Molloy – 1957
- John Graham – 1958
- Bruce McPhail – 1959
- Kelvin Tremain – 1959

=== 1960–79 ===
- Hugh Burry – 1960
- John Creighton – 1962
- Jules Le Lievre – 1962
- Bruce Watt – 1962
- Ray Moreton – 1962
- John Morrissey – 1962
- Allan Stewart – 1963
- Bluey Arnold – 1963
- Chris Laidlaw – 1963
- Bill Birtwistle – 1965
- Fergie McCormick – 1965
- Wayne Cottrell – 1967
- Alister Hopkinson – 1967
- Tony Steel – 1967
- Ian Kirkpatrick – 1967
- Jake Burns – 1970
- Alex Wyllie – 1970
- Tane Norton – 1971
- Howard Joseph – 1971
- Hamish Macdonald – 1972
- Duncan Hales – 1972
- Ian Hurst – 1972
- Kerry Tanner – 1974
- Doug Bruce – 1974
- Billy Bush – 1974
- Terry Mitchell – 1974
- Lyn Davis – 1976
- Scott Cartwright – 1976
- Stewart Cron – 1976
- Vance Stewart – 1976
- Richard Wilson – 1976
- John Black – 1976
- John Ashworth – 1977
- Clive Currie – 1978
- Barry Thompson – 1979
- Kieran Keane – 1979

=== 1980–99 ===
- Wayne Smith – 1980
- Graeme Higginson – 1980
- Stephen Scott – 1980
- Jock Hobbs – 1983
- Warwick Taylor – 1983
- Robbie Deans – 1983
- Craig Green – 1983
- Albert Anderson – 1983
- Murray Davie – 1983
- Victor Simpson – 1985
- Mike Brewer – 1986
- Andy Earl – 1986
- Richard Loe – 1986
- Graeme Bachop – 1987
- John Buchan – 1987
- Bruce Deans – 1987
- Shayne Philpott – 1988
- Jon Preston – 1991
- Dallas Seymour – 1992
- Andrew Mehrtens – 1995
- Todd Blackadder – 1995
- Justin Marshall – 1995
- Tabai Matson – 1995
- Con Barrell – 1996
- Steve Surridge – 1997
- Mark Mayerhofler – 1998
- Caleb Ralph – 1998
- Scott Robertson – 1998
- Mark Hammett – 1999
- Daryl Gibson – 1999
- Norm Maxwell – 1999
- Greg Feek – 1999
- Reuben Thorne – 1999

=== 2000–19 ===
- Greg Somerville – 2000
- Leon MacDonald – 2000
- Mark Robinson – 2000
- Chris Jack – 2001
- Ben Blair – 2001
- Dave Hewett – 2001
- Nathan Mauger – 2001
- Aaron Mauger – 2001
- Richie McCaw – 2001
- Sam Broomhall – 2002
- Dan Carter – 2003
- Brad Thorn – 2003
- Corey Flynn – 2003
- Mose Tuiali'i – 2004
- Casey Laulala – 2004
- Campbell Johnstone – 2005
- Scott Hamilton – 2006
- Andy Ellis – 2006
- Kieran Read – 2008
- Ben Franks – 2008
- Isaac Ross – 2009
- Wyatt Crockett – 2009
- George Whitelock – 2009
- Owen Franks – 2009
- Sam Whitelock – 2010
- Colin Slade – 2010
- Sonny Bill Williams – 2010
- Luke Romano – 2012
- Matt Todd – 2013
- Ryan Crotty – 2013
- Tom Taylor – 2013
- Dominic Bird – 2013
- Luke Whitelock – 2013
- Joe Moody – 2014
- Codie Taylor – 2015
- Nepo Laulala – 2015
- Scott Barrett – 2016
- Richie Mo'unga – 2018
- George Bridge – 2018
- Mitchell Drummond - 2018
- Braydon Ennor - 2019
- Sevu Reece - 2019

=== 2020– ===
- Cullen Grace - 2020
- Fletcher Newell - 2022
- Tamaiti Williams - 2023
- Dallas McLeod - 2023
- George Bell - 2024
- Sam Darry - 2024

== See also ==
- Rugby union in New Zealand
- Structure of rugby union in New Zealand

== Sources ==
- Gifford, Phil (2004). The Passion – The Stories Behind 125 years of Canterbury Rugby. Wilson Scott Publishing. ISBN 0-9582535-1-X.
- Ryan, Greg (1993). Forerunners of the All Blacks. Christchurch, New Zealand: Canterbury University Press. ISBN 0-908812-30-2.
- "Canterbury rugby". Ministry for Culture and Heritage. 20 December 2012.
- "South Canterbury rugby". Ministry for Culture and Heritage. 20 December 2012.
- "Mid Canterbury rugby". Ministry for Culture and Heritage. 20 December 2012.
- "Early rugby in Christchurch". Christchurch City Libraries.
