= 1928 New Zealand rugby union tour of South Africa =

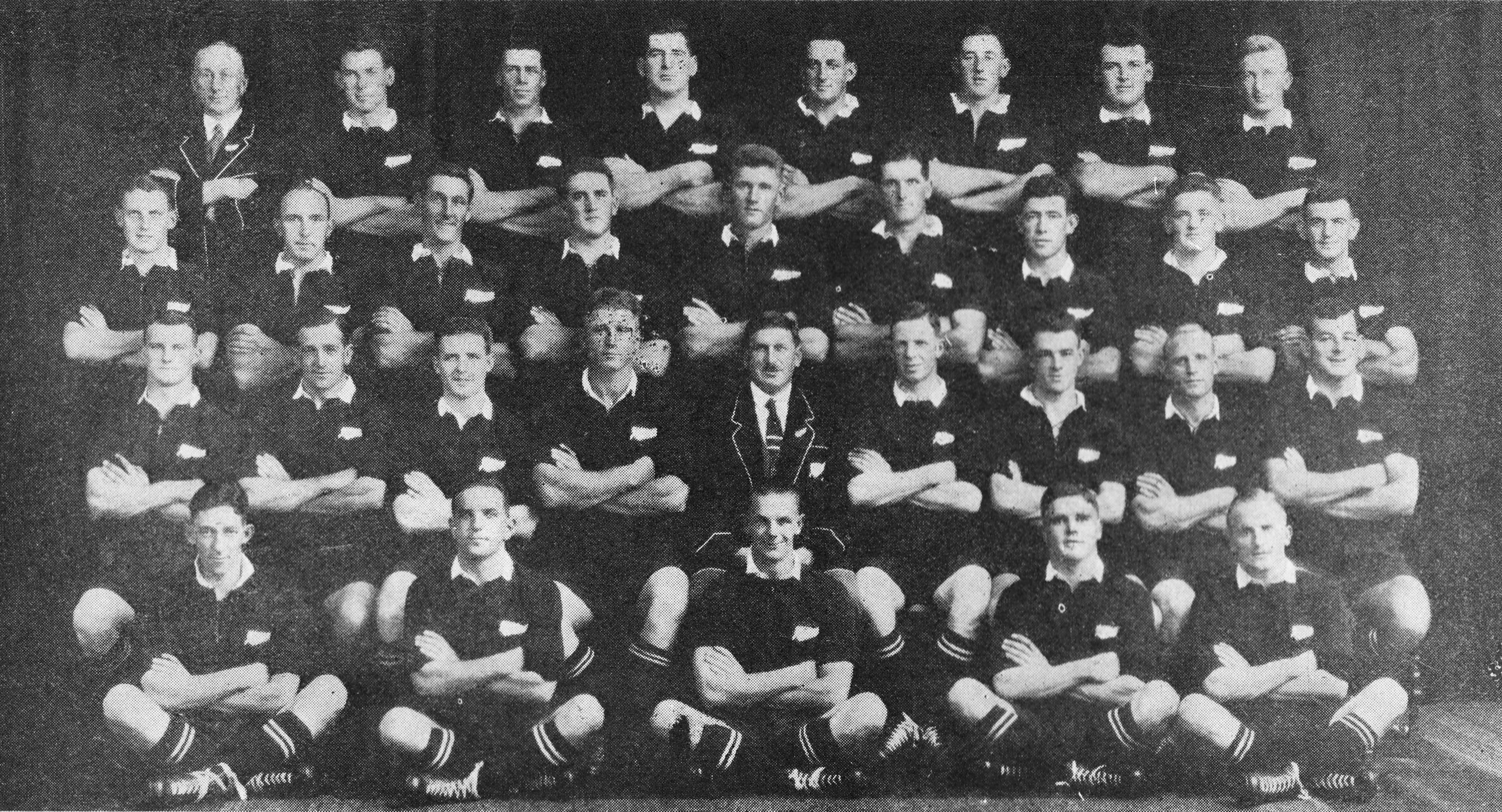
- The touring All Blacks team, photographed in Wellington
Summary
P	W	D	L
Total
22	16	1	5
Test match
4	2	0	2
Opponent
P	W	D	L
South Africa
4	2	0	2

In 1928, the New Zealand national rugby union team (the All Blacks) undertook a three-month tour of South Africa. The series of four Test matches was drawn 2–2 and the overall tour record was sixteen wins, five losses and one draw.

== Matches ==
Scores and results list New Zealand's points tally first.

Opposing Team	For	Against	Date	Venue	Status
Wes. Province Country	11	3	30 May 1928	Newlands, Cape Town	Tour Match
Cape Town Clubs	3	7	2 June 1928	Newlands, Cape Town	Tour Match
Griqualand West	19	10	6 June 1928	de Beer's Stadium, Kimberly	Tour Match
Transvaal	0	6	9 June 1928	Ellis Park, Johannesburg	Tour Match
Orange Free State	20	0	13 June 1928	Kroonstad Ground, Kroonstad	Tour Match
Transvaal	5	0	16 June 1928	Ellis Park, Transvaal	Tour Match
Western Transvaal	19	8	20 June 1928	Kruger Park, Potchefstroom	Tour Match
Natal	31	3	23 June 1928	Pietermaritzburg Ground, Pietermaritzburg	Tour Match
South Africa	0	17	30 June 1928	Durban	Test Match
Northern Provinces	18	18	7 July 1928	de Beer's Stadium, Kimberly	Tour Match
Rhodesia	44	8	14 July 1928	Bulawayo Athletic Club, Bulawayo	Tour Match
South Africa	7	6	21 July 1928	Ellis Park, Johannesburg	Test Match
Pretoria Clubs	13	6	25 July 1928	Eastern Sports Ground, Pretoria	Tour Match
Orange Free State	15	11	28 July 1928	Ramblers' Cricket Ground, Bloemfontein	Tour Match
North-Eastern Districts	27	0	1 August 1928	Burghersdorp Ground, Burgersdorp	Tour Match
Border	22	3	4 August 1928	Recreation Ground, East London	Tour Match
Border	35	3	8 August 1928	Victoria Grounds, King William's Town	Tour Match
Eastern Province	16	3	11 August 1928	Port Elizabeth	Tour Match
South Africa	6	11	18 August 1928	Port Elizabeth	Test Match
South-Western Districts	12	6	22 August 1928	Oudtshoorn Ground, Oudtshoorn	Tour Match
Western Province	3	10	25 August 1928	Newlands, Cape Town	Tour Match
South Africa	13	5	1 September 1928	Newlands, Cape Town	Test Match

== Touring party ==
- Manager:
- Assistant manager:
- Captain: Maurice Brownlie (Hawke's Bay)

Full-back

- Herb Lilburne (Canterbury)

Three-quarters

- Bert Grenside (Hawke's Bay)
- Alan Robilliard (Canterbury)
- Charlie Rushbrook (Wellington)
- Fred Lucas (Auckland)
- Sydney Carleton (Canterbury)

Half-backs

- David Lindsay (Otago)
- Toby Sheen (Auckland)
- Lance Johnson (Wellington)
- Neil McGregor (Canterbury)
- Mark Nicholls (Wellington)
- Archie Strang (South Canterbury)
- Bill Dalley (Canterbury)
- Frank Kilby (Wellington)

Forwards

- Geoff Alley (Canterbury)
- Cyril Brownlie (Hawke's Bay)
- Maurice Brownlie (Hawke's Bay)
- Jim Burrows (Canterbury)
- Innes Finlayson (North Auckland)
- Swin Hadley (Auckland)
- Ian Harvey (Wairarapa)
- Bill Hazlett (Southland)
- John Hore (Otago)
- Rube McWilliams (Auckland)
- George Scrimshaw (Canterbury)
- Eric Snow (Nelson)
- Ron Stewart (South Canterbury)
- John Swain (Hawkes Bay)
- Pat Ward (Taranaki)
