= Ashburton College =

Location
- 27 Walnut Avenue; Ashburton 7700; New Zealand; 43.8921°S 171.7514°E

Information
- Established: 1965
- Ministry of Education Institution no.: 351
- Chairperson: Jen Muir
- Principal: Simon Coleman
- Years offered: 9–13
- Gender: Coeducational
- Enrolment: 1,391 (July 2026)
- Socio-economic decile: 6N
- Website: ashburtoncollege.school.nz

Ashburton College is a state coeducational secondary school located in Ashburton, New Zealand. It opened in 1965 following the merger of two Ashburton secondary schools: Ashburton High School and Hakatere College, and moved to its current site in 1974. Serving years 9 to 13, Ashburton College has a roll of 1,391 students as of July 2026.

== Enrolment ==
Ashburton College is naturally zoned by the school's relative isolation (the nearest alternative state secondary school is Mount Hutt College, 35 km away in Methven), therefore does not need to operate an enrolment scheme. The school has an effective service area of the entire township of Ashburton and much of the coastal half of Mid-Canterbury, with Mount Hutt College in Methven, Ellesmere College in Leeston, Geraldine High School in Geraldine, and the Pacific Ocean bounding the Ashburton College service area to the west, north, south and east respectively.

At the April 2013 Education Review Office (ERO) review of the school, the school had 1173 students enrolled, including twelve international students. Fifty-one percent of students were male and 49 percent were female. Seventy-seven percent of students identified as New Zealand European (Pākehā), ten percent as Māori, four percent as Pasifika, three percent as Asian, and six percent as another ethnicity.

As of July 2026, Ashburton High School has roll of 1,391 students, of which 223 (16.0%) identify as Māori.

As of 2026, the school has an Equity Index of 467, placing it amongst schools whose students have average socioeconomic barriers to achievement (roughly equivalent to deciles 5 and 6 under the former socio-economic decile system).

== Critical praise ==
In 2012 Ashburton College was first equal in The Clean Green Business Award, won the Large Business Award and was also named the Overall Supreme Award winner in the Ashburton Business Association biennial business awards.

In 2008, The Education Review Office ranked the school the top in the country for the promotion of male's learning.

Statistics from the 2008 NCEA results ranked the school fifth in performance out of the 19 decile seven to nine schools.

== Notable alumni ==
- Paul Ackerley – Olympic gold medal-winning hockey player
- Simon Barnett – radio and television personality
- Doug Bruce – All Black rugby player (1974–78) and coach of Canterbury
- Denis Cameron – All Black rugby player (1960)
- Jack Kelly – All Black rugby player (1949–54)
- Bruce McPhail – All Black rugby player (1959)
- Robyn Malcolm – television actress
- Simon O'Neill – tenor
- Brent Pope – Irish media personality
- Alan Robilliard – All Black rugby player (1924–28)
- Hayden Roulston – Olympic silver medal cyclist
- Robert Taylor – Radio Announcer The Sound

== Ashburton Astronomy Group Observatory ==
The Ashburton Astronomy Group Observatory is situated in the grounds of Ashburton College. The building and equipment is owned by the college but administered and maintained by the AAG.

The primary instrument in use is a 130-year-old equatorially mounted 230mm With-Browning newtonian reflector telescope. The observatory is of the roll-off-roof variety.
