= Henry Frost =

Henry or Harry Frost may refer to:

- H. A. Frost (Henry Adolph Frost, 1844–1909), Australian saddler and businessman
- Harry Frost (rugby union) (1869–1954), New Zealand rugby player
- Henry Atherton Frost (1883–1952), American architect
- Harry Frost (1914–1973), Canadian ice hockey player
- Henry Frost, fictional serial killer on season 3 of Criminal Minds
