= Rube McWilliams =

New Zealand rugby union player (1901–1984)

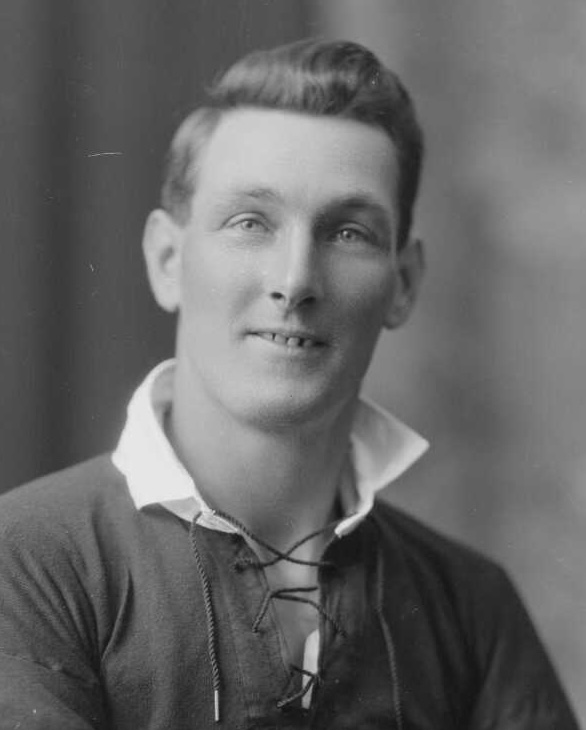
- McWilliams in 1928
- Born: Ruben George McWilliams; 12 June 1901 Paeroa, New Zealand
- Died: 27 January 1984 (aged 82) Auckland, New Zealand
- Height: 1.85 m (6 ft 1 in)
- Weight: 91 kg (201 lb)

Rugby union career
- Position: Loose forward
Provincial / State sides
Years	Team	Apps	(Points)
1922–30	Auckland		
International career
Years	Team	Apps	(Points)
1928–30	New Zealand	10	(3)

Ruben George McWilliams (12 June 1901 – 27 January 1984), commonly known as Rube, was a New Zealand rugby union player. A loose forward, McWilliams represented Auckland at a provincial level from 1922, and was a member of the New Zealand national side, the All Blacks, from 1928 to 1930. He played 27 matches for the All Blacks and was the first to play 10 consecutive tests, scoring 25 points (seven tries and two conversions) in all.

== Early life and family ==
McWilliams was born on 12 June 1901 in Paeroa. His father was James Alexander McWilliams (1854–1935), described as one of the pioneers from the Waikato. McWilliams junior attended Eureka School and Hamilton West School, so named of the Hamilton suburb. Tom McWilliams, the radio operator for Charles Kingsford Smith's 1928 Trans-Pacific flight, was Ruben McWilliams' cousin.

== Rugby union career ==
In 1927, McWilliams was described as a "dashing forward" and "very fast", weighing in at 201 lb (14 st 5 lb; 91 kg) and standing 6 feet 1 inch (1.85 m) tall. McWilliams was chosen in October 1927 for his international debut against South Africa as part of the 1928 New Zealand rugby union tour of South Africa; the game was played at the Kingsmead Cricket Ground in Durban in June 1928. At the time, McWilliams and his fellow All Black Fred Lucas both played for Ponsonby RFC. Following the South Africa tour, the Waikato Times described McWilliams as the country's best forward. On their return to New Zealand, the five representatives from Auckland (apart from McWilliams and Lucas, there were Toby Sheen, Swin Hadley, and Innes Finlayson) were welcomed at the Chamber of Commerce by rugby union officials and the deputy mayor of Auckland, Andrew Entrican. In 1930, McWilliams was appointed as coach for the Frankton Football Club in Hamilton, but he also captained the team.

In 1937, McWilliams was used as co-selector for Auckland's match against the touring South African team. He missed the fiftieth reunion for members of the 1928 tour held in 1978 in Christchurch for health reasons.

== Yachting ==
McWilliams was a member of the Ponsonby Cruising Club and competed with them in yachting.

== Death ==
McWilliams died on 27 January 1984. He is buried at Waikumete Cemetery.
