= Andrew McCormick (rugby union) =

Japan international rugby union player

- Born: Andrew Fergus McCormick; 5 February 1967 (age 59) Christchurch, New Zealand
- Height: 6 ft 1 in (1.85 m)
- Weight: 204 lb (93 kg)
- School: Christchurch Boys' High School
- Notable relative(s): Fergie McCormick (father); Archie McCormick (grandfather)

Rugby union career
- Position: Centre
Amateur team(s)
Years	Team	Apps	(Points)
1988–1992	Linwood		
Senior career
Years	Team	Apps	(Points)
1993–2002	Toshiba Fuchu		
2002–2004	Kamaishi Seawaves		
Provincial / State sides
Years	Team	Apps	(Points)
1988–1992	Canterbury	84	(81)
International career
Years	Team	Apps	(Points)
1988	New Zealand Colts	4	(4)
1996–1999	Japan	25	(15)
Coaching career
- Years: Team
- 2000: Toshiba Fuchu
- 2004: Kamaishi Seawaves
- 2005: Coca-Cola Red Sparks
- 2011: NTT DoCoMo Red Hurricanes
- 2012: Kwansei Gakuin University RFC

Andrew Fergus McCormick (アンドリュー・マコーミック; born 5 February 1967) is a New Zealand-born Japanese rugby union coach and former player.

The son of All Black Fergie McCormick, McCormick (nicknamed "Angus") was educated at Christchurch Boys' High School and came to Japan to play for Toshiba Fuchu in 1992. He was a powerful centre who had a large impact and played 25 times for the Japan national rugby union team, which he captained during the 1999 Rugby World Cup. A hugely popular player, he began coaching at Toshiba and then became a player (2002) and technical adviser (2004) at Kamaishi Seawaves.

On 23 March 2005, it was announced that McCormick would take up a post as backs coach at Coca-Cola West Japan on the invitation of head coach Shogo Mukai.

McCormick is currently Head Coach of Kwansei Gakuin University’s rugby club.
