= Fergie McCormick =

New Zealand rugby union player (1939–2018)

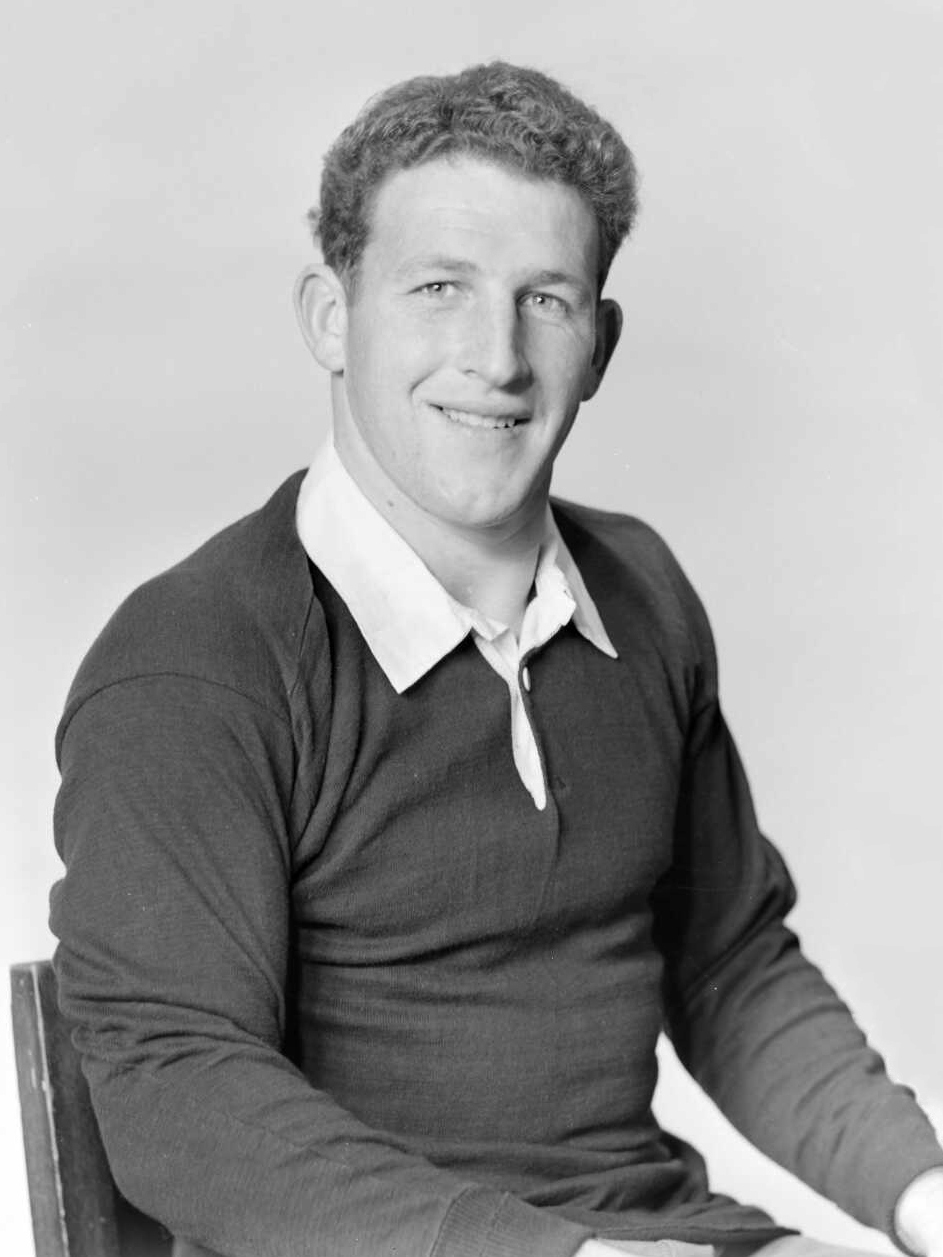
- McCormick, c. 1961
- Born: William Fergus McCormick; 24 April 1939 Ashburton, New Zealand
- Died: 10 April 2018 (aged 78) Christchurch, New Zealand
- Height: 1.70 m (5 ft 7 in)
- Weight: 83 kg (183 lb)
- School: Papanui High School; Christchurch Boys' High School
- Notable relatives: Archie McCormick (father); Andrew McCormick (son)

Rugby union career
- Position: Fullback
Amateur team(s)
Years	Team	Apps	(Points)
1957–1975	Linwood		(777)
Provincial / State sides
Years	Team	Apps	(Points)
1958–1975	Canterbury	222	(1297)
International career
Years	Team	Apps	(Points)
1965–1971	New Zealand	16	(121)

William Fergus McCormick (24 April 1939 – 10 April 2018) was a New Zealand rugby union footballer who played for the All Blacks and Canterbury. McCormick first played representative rugby for Canterbury in 1958 when he played first five-eighth against Wellington. The following year he played twelve matches for Canterbury; the first of the season a 20–14 victory over the touring British Lions.

As well as playing regularly for the South Island, McCormick continued playing for Canterbury where he eventually switched to fullback. In 1965 he was selected for his first Test for the New Zealand national side (the All Blacks), which was a 20–3 victory over South Africa. He was next selected for the All Blacks in 1967 for their tour of Canada, the British Isles and France. He was a regular starter for the All Blacks and toured with them to South Africa in 1970. He was dropped for the fourth Test of the South Africa tour and made his final appearance for the All Blacks against the British Lions in 1971.

McCormick continued to play for Canterbury, however. When he retired, following the 1975 season, he had scored a record total of 1297 points for Canterbury. He scored a total of 2065 points in 310 first class matches.

McCormick died in Christchurch from throat cancer on 10 April 2018.

== Bibliography ==
- Gifford, Phil (2004). The Passion – The Stories Behind 125 years of Canterbury Rugby. Wilson Scott Publishing. ISBN 0-9582535-1-X.
- Veysey, Alex (1976). Fergie. Christchurch: Whitcoulls Publishers. ISBN 0-7233-0469-6.
