= Wilson Whineray =

Sir Wilson Whineray KNZM OBE
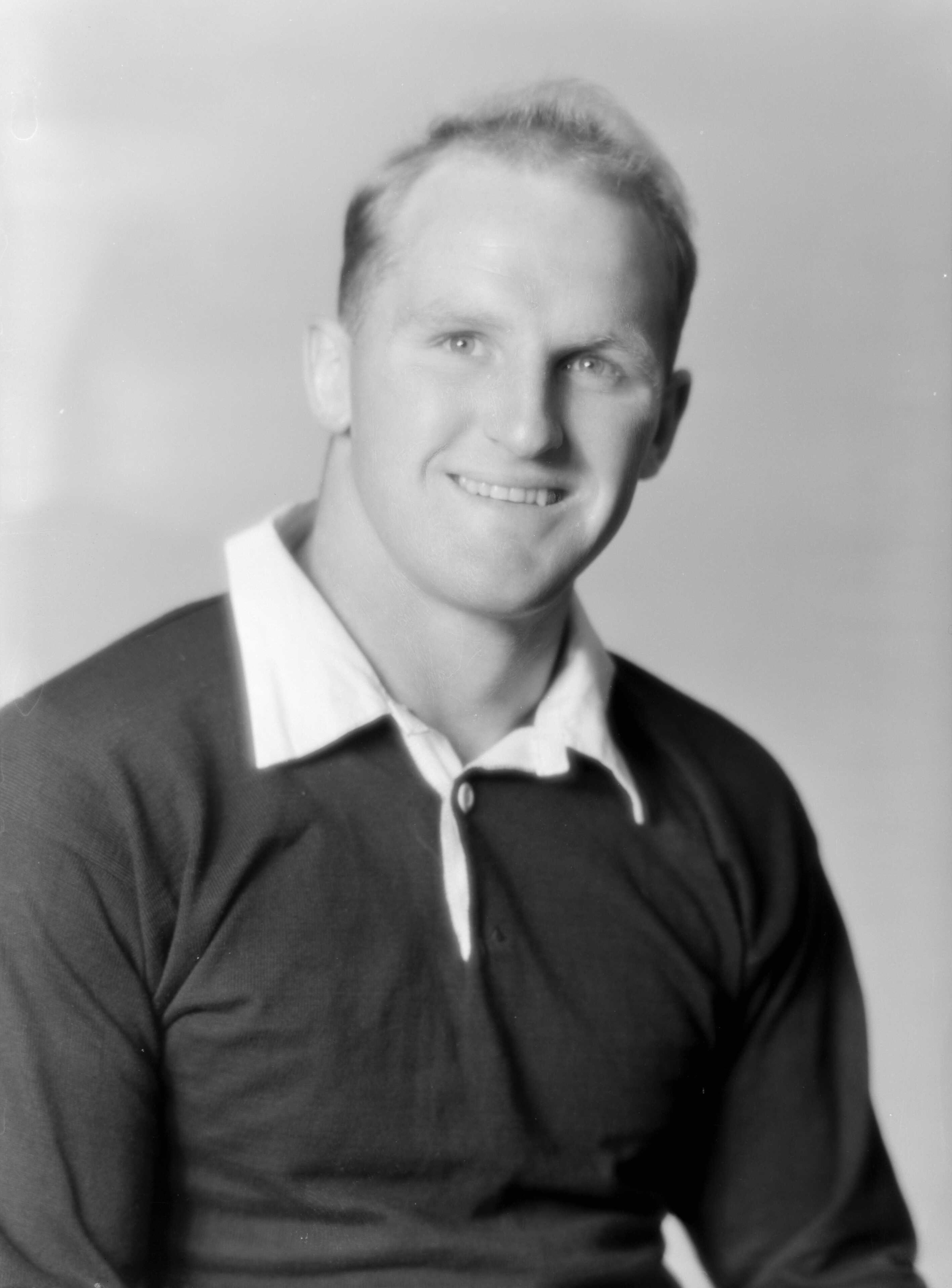
- Born: Wilson James Whineray; 10 July 1935 Auckland, New Zealand
- Died: 22 October 2012 (aged 77) Auckland, New Zealand
- Height: 1.83 m (6 ft 0 in)
- Weight: 94 kg (14 st 11 lb)
- School: Auckland Grammar School
- University: University of Auckland; Harvard University; Lincoln University

Rugby union career
- Position: Prop
Provincial / State sides
Years	Team	Apps	(Points)
1953	Wairarapa	3	
1954	Mid Canterbury	9	
1955	Manawatu	7	
1956–1957	Canterbury	16	
1958	Waikato	7	
1959–1966	Auckland	61	
International career
Years	Team	Apps	(Points)
1957–1965	New Zealand	32	(6)

Sir Wilson James Whineray KNZM OBE (10 July 1935 – 22 October 2012) was a New Zealand business executive and rugby union player. He was the longest-serving captain of the national rugby union team, the All Blacks, until surpassed by Richie McCaw in 2014. Rugby writer Terry McLean considered him the All Blacks' greatest captain.

== Domestic career ==
Owing to his early career as an agricultural cadet, which involved considerable travel around the country, Whineray played for six first-class teams, including Wairarapa, Mid Canterbury, Manawatu, Canterbury, Waikato, and finally his hometown team, Auckland, for whom he made 61 appearances between 1959 and 1966. He also played for the South Island, North Island, and New Zealand Universities sides.

== International career ==
He first played for the All Blacks in 1957. The following year he became captain for the 1958 series against Australia at the young age of 23. He went on to play 77 matches for the All Blacks between 1957 and 1965, 67 of them as captain. These included 32 test matches, all but two of them as captain. He played mostly in the position of prop. Whineray was appointed an Officer of the Order of the British Empire (OBE), for services to sport, especially to rugby football, in the 1962 New Year Honours, and he was named New Zealand Sportsperson of the Year in 1965.

== Later life ==
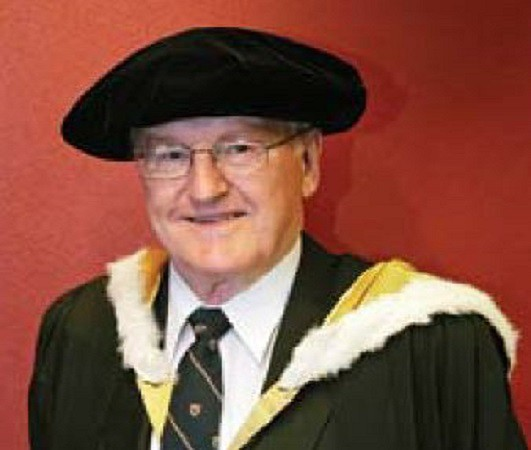
Whineray in 2006

After retiring from rugby, he gained an MBA from Harvard University, where he was a member of the Harvard Business School RFC. He returned to New Zealand in 1969 and started work at Alex Harvey Industries, which became Carter Holt Harvey. He rose to become deputy managing director, then chairman of the board of Carter Holt Harvey, by then a major New Zealand company, and retired from the board in 2003. He was the managing director of NZ Wool Marketing Corporation in 1973–74, chairman of the National Bank of New Zealand, and a director of Auckland International Airport and APN News & Media.

He was chairman of the Hillary Commission, a sports funding body, from 1993 to 1998. He was the honorary Colonel Commandant of the New Zealand Special Air Service from 1997 to 2001.

In the 1998 Queen's Birthday Honours, Whineray was appointed a Knight Companion of the New Zealand Order of Merit (KNZM), for services to sport and business management. In 2003, he was inducted into the New Zealand Business Hall of Fame.

In November 2004, it was reported that Whineray was a top contender to replace Dame Silvia Cartwright as Governor-General in 2006. Bob Howitt has said that, "had he allowed his name to go forward, he would have become the Governor-General". He became the first New Zealander inducted into the IRB Hall of Fame, being elected on 21 October 2007 (following the IRB World Cup in France) after a public vote.

Whineray died in Auckland in 2012, at the age of 77. He was buried at Purewa Cemetery in the Auckland suburb of Meadowbank.

== All Blacks statistics ==
- Tests: 32 (30 as captain)
- Games: 45 (37 as captain)
- Total matches: 77 (67 as captain)
- Test points: 6 (2 tries)
- Game points: 18 (5 tries, 1 dropped goal)
- Total points: 24 (7 tries, 1 dropped goal)

Sporting positions
Preceded by Ponty Reid	All Blacks Captain; 1958–1964	Succeeded by John Graham
