= Pat Vincent =

- Born: Patrick Bernard Vincent; 6 January 1926 Whataroa, New Zealand
- Died: 10 April 1983 (aged 57) Pittsburgh, PA, USA
- Height: 1.75 m (5 ft 9 in)
- Weight: 78 kg (172 lb)
- School: Christchurch Boys
- University: University of Canterbury
- Occupation: School teacher

Rugby union career
- Position: Halfback
Provincial / State sides
Years	Team	Apps	(Points)
- Canterbury
International career
Years	Team	Apps	(Points)
1956	New Zealand	2	(0)
Coaching career
- Years: Team
- 1959–62: Canterbury
- 1968–83: St. Mary's (CA)

Patrick Bernard Vincent (6 January 1926 – 10 April 1983) was a New Zealand rugby union player and later a rugby coach in the United States. A halfback, Vincent represented Canterbury at a provincial level, and was a member of the New Zealand national side, the All Blacks, in 1956. He played just two games for the All Blacks, both of them test matches against the touring South African team, and was captain on both occasions. He went on to be the Canterbury coach between 1959 and 1962.

Vincent was educated at Christchurch Boys' High School, and then studied at Canterbury University College, from where he graduated with a Bachelor of Arts in 1948.

== United States ==
Vincent emigrated to the United States in 1967, where he lived the rest of his life. He coached the college rugby team for St. Mary's College of California from 1968 to 1983. Vincent also had a number of administrative rugby roles — he was the President of the Northern California Rugby Union from 1973 to 1976, a charter signer and Founder of USA Rugby in 1975, and a Governor of the U.S. Union from 1975 to 1977.

Vincent died in 1983.

Vincent was one of the inaugural members inducted into the U.S. Rugby Hall of Fame in 2011.

Sporting positions
Preceded by Ian Clarke	All Blacks Captain; 1956	Succeeded by Bob Duff
