= Bruce McPhail =

New Zealand rugby union player (1937–2020)

- Born: Bruce Eric McPhail; 26 January 1937 Ashburton, New Zealand
- Died: 21 July 2020 (aged 83) Hamilton, New Zealand
- School: Ashburton High School

Rugby union career
- Position: Wing
Provincial / State sides
Years	Team	Apps	(Points)
1956	Mid Canterbury	6	
1957–59	Canterbury	24	
1960–63	Nelson	35	
International career
Years	Team	Apps	(Points)
1959	New Zealand	2	(0)

Bruce Eric McPhail (26 January 1937 – 21 July 2020) was a New Zealand rugby union player. A wing, McPhail represented Mid Canterbury, Canterbury, and Nelson at a provincial level, and was a member of the New Zealand national side, the All Blacks, in 1959. He played two matches for the All Blacks, both of them tests against the touring British Lions.

McPhail died in Hamilton on 21 July 2020.
