= Jack Kelly (rugby union, born 1926) =

NZ rugby union player (1926–2002)

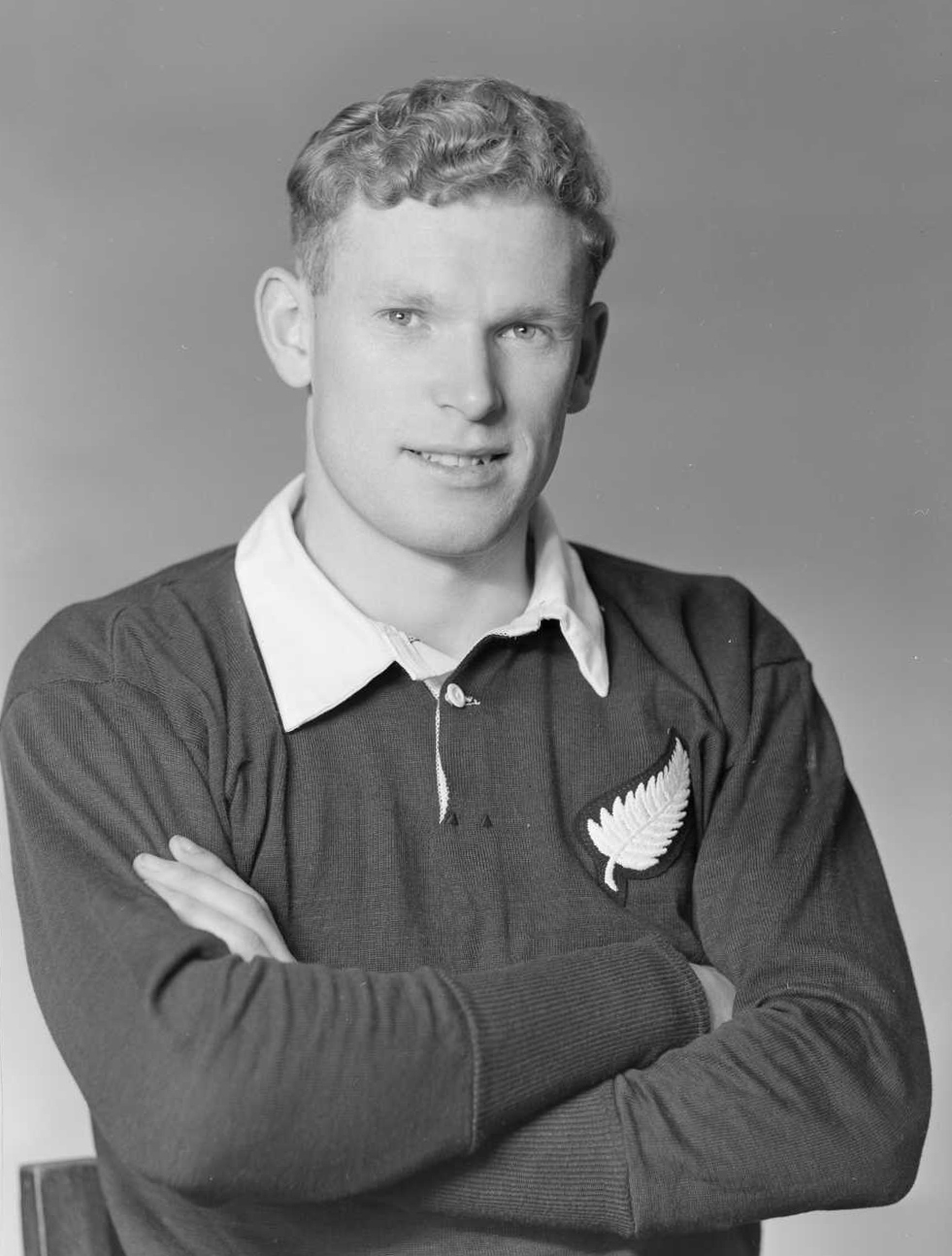
- Kelly in 1948
- Born: John Wallace Kelly; 7 December 1926 Ashburton, New Zealand
- Died: 29 April 2002 (aged 75) Auckland, New Zealand
- Height: 1.83 m (6 ft 0 in)
- Weight: 84 kg (185 lb)
- School: Ashburton High School
- University: Canterbury University College
- Occupation: School teacher

Rugby union career
- Position(s): Fullback, wing
Provincial / State sides
Years	Team	Apps	(Points)
1945–48	Canterbury		
1949–54	Auckland		
International career
Years	Team	Apps	(Points)
1946–48	NZ Universities		
1949, 1953–54	New Zealand	2	(3)

John Wallace Kelly (7 December 1926 – 29 April 2002) was a New Zealand rugby union player. His preferred position was fullback, but he also appeared on the wing or at centre. A fine goal-kicker, Kelly represented Canterbury and Auckland at a provincial level. He first played for the New Zealand national side, the All Blacks, in 1949, playing in the two test matches against the Touring Australian team. He was not selected to play for New Zealand again until the 1953–54 tour of the British Isles, France and North America on which he played in 14 of the 36 games, but he was unable to displace Bob Scott as the first-choice fullback for the test matches. In all, Kelly scored 86 points for the All Blacks in his 16 appearances.

Outside of rugby, Kelly was a fine field athlete at the junior level, winning the South Island junior shot put and discus titles in 1944, and finishing second in the same events at the national championships the following year. He was educated at Ashburton High School, and then studied at Canterbury University College from where he graduated with a Bachelor of Arts in 1948 and a Master of Arts with third-class honours in 1949. He went on to teachers' training college in Auckland and became a high school teacher and, eventually, headmaster of Takapuna Grammar School.
