= John Swindley =

- Born: Jack Tila Swindley; 1 July 1876 Mercury Bay, New Zealand
- Died: 5 August 1918 (aged 42) Sumatra, Indonesia
- Occupation(s): Blacksmith; Miner

Rugby union career
- Position: Forward
Amateur team(s)
Years	Team	Apps	(Points)
1894–95	Athletic		
1896	Kuaotunu		
Provincial / State sides
Years	Team	Apps	(Points)
1894–95	Wellington	11	(9)
1896	Auckland	3	(0)
International career
Years	Team	Apps	(Points)
1894	New Zealand	0	(0)

John Tila Swindley (1 July 1876 – 5 August 1918) was a New Zealand rugby union player who represented the All Blacks in 1894. His position of choice was forward.

Although Jack was his birth name, Swindley was commonly known as John and in some publications, James.

== Career ==
Initially Swindley played for Wellington's Athletic club. He played in the Wellington provincial side for all seven games in the 1894 season. He had a further four games totalled in 1895.

Swindley made his only All Black appearance as an 18-year-old in 1894, named in an unofficial test match against the touring New South Wales side. The match was lost 8-6.

In 1896 he moved North to play for the Kuaotunu club near the Coromandel Peninsula and Whitianga where he originated from. The nearest union to him was North Auckland, but surprisingly, Swindley was selected for Auckland to play in the 1896 season which included a game against the visiting Queensland team. He played 3 games for the Auckland union.

Swindley was further selected for the All Black test match against the Queensland team but was forced to withdraw because of an injury (being replaced by Harry Frost).

He never played first-class rugby again but continued to play in the Thames area (which by then was part of the Auckland union).

He became the Thames captain and sustained the roll until 1901.

== Personal and death ==
Swindley first became a blacksmith, and then a miner. He left New Zealand in 1904 for Sumatra, Dutch East Indies (now Indonesia), to become a mining engineer. He died at the age of 42 in a mining accident in 1918. He was buried at Fort de Kock.

Swindley's father, Frederick, was part of the Armed Constabulary in the Urewera invasion. His service lasted from November 1868 to November 1872.
