= Eric Snow (rugby union) =

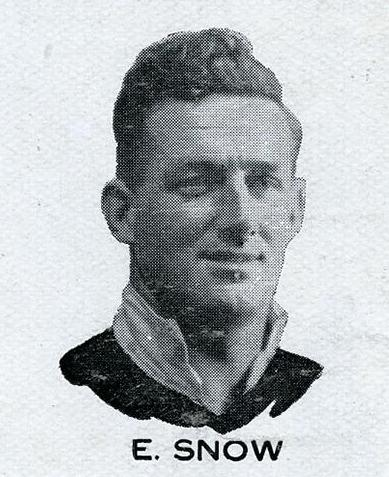
- Born: Eric McDonald Snow; 19 April 1898 Nelson, New Zealand
- Died: 24 July 1974 (aged 76) Nelson, New Zealand
- Height: 1.86 m (6 ft 1 in)
- Weight: 86 kg (13 st 8 lb)

Rugby union career
- Position: Loose forward
Amateur team(s)
Years	Team	Apps	(Points)
1918–24, 26–27, 29–30	Nelson		
Provincial / State sides
Years	Team	Apps	(Points)
1918–24, 26–27, 29–30	Nelson	34	
International career
Years	Team	Apps	(Points)
1928–29	New Zealand	3	(3)

Eric "Fritz" McDonald Snow (19 April 1898 – 24 July 1974) was a New Zealand rugby union player who represented the All Blacks between 1928 and 1929. His position of choice was loose forward.

== Career ==
Snow played thirty-four times for the now defunct Nelson province.

He was first selected for the national side on their tour of South Africa in 1928, where he played in nine matches.

Snow was further chosen for the 1929 tour of Australia. He played seven matches, and appeared in all three tests. He scored three points (a try) in a non-test game.

== Personal ==
After retiring from playing, Snow was on the Nelson club committee. He also served as club captain, selector and coach. Two brothers Herbert (Herb) and Vernon also played for Nelson.
