= Ponty Reid =

New Zealand rugby union player

- Born: Alan Robin Reid; 12 April 1929 Te Kūiti, New Zealand
- Died: 16 November 1994 (aged 65) Morrinsville, New Zealand
- Height: 1.60 m (5 ft 3 in)
- Weight: 59 kg (130 lb)
- School: New Plymouth Boys' High School
- University: Auckland Teachers' Training College
- Occupation: Schoolteacher

Rugby union career
- Position: Halfback
Provincial / State sides
Years	Team	Apps	(Points)
1950–1958	Waikato		
International career
Years	Team	Apps	(Points)
1951–1957	New Zealand	5	(0)

Alan Robin "Ponty" Reid (12 April 1929 – 16 November 1994) was a New Zealand rugby union player. A halfback, Reid represented Waikato at a provincial level, and was a member of the New Zealand national side, the All Blacks, from 1951 to 1957. He played 17 matches for the All Blacks including 10 as captain, and appeared in five Tests. With a height of 1.60 metres (5 ft 3 in), Reid is one of the shortest All Blacks ever. Reid was diagnosed with frontotemporal dementia in 1985, and he died in 1994.

Sporting positions
Preceded by Bob Duff	All Blacks captain 1957	Succeeded by Wilson Whineray
