= Charlie Rushbrook =

New Zealand rugby union player

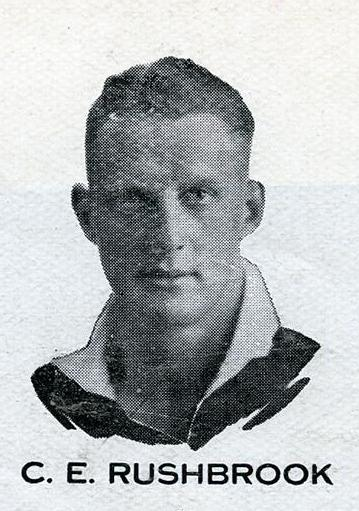
- Full name: Charles Archibald Rushbrook
- Born: 6 January 1907 Wellington, New Zealand
- Died: 31 July 1987 (aged 80) Waikanae, New Zealand
- Height: 183 cm (6 ft 0 in)
- Weight: 80 kg (176 lb)
- School: Wellington College

Rugby union career
- Position: Wing
Provincial / State sides
| Years | Team | Apps | (Points) |
| 1926–30 | Wellington | | |
International career
| Years | Team | Apps | (Points) |
| 1928 | New Zealand | | |

Charles Archibald Rushbrook (6 January 1907 – 31 July 1987) was a New Zealand international rugby union player.

== Biography ==
A speedy wing three-quarter, Rushbrook had two years in the first XV at Wellington College and also excelled in athletics as a sprinter, representing Wellington in two editions of the national championships.

Rushbrook was a regular try-scorer for Wellington and in 1928 won an All Blacks call up for their tour of South Africa, where he scored 10 tries from nine tour matches, but didn't feature in any of the Tests.

On the trip home from South Africa, the All Blacks travelled to Melbourne and Rushbrook scored seven tries in a match against Victoria, a record tally not bettered until 1962 by Rod Heeps.

== See also ==
- List of New Zealand national rugby union players
