= John Buchan (rugby union) =

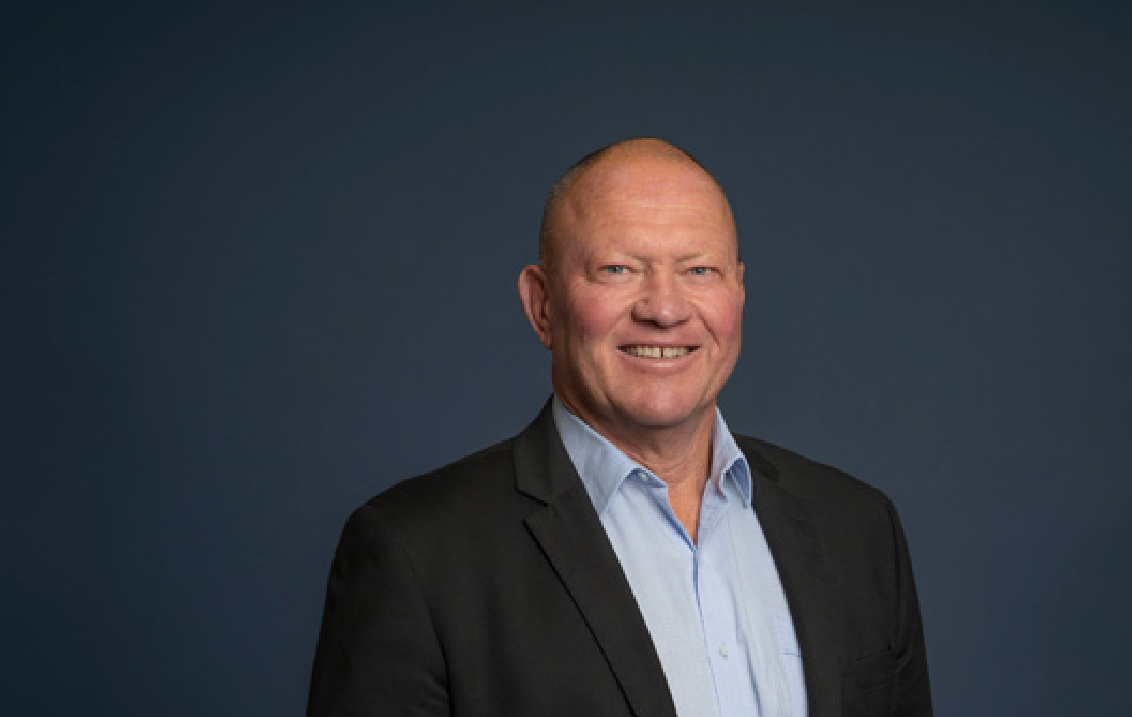
- John Buchan - 2023
- Born: John Alexander Shepherd Buchan; 17 June 1961 (age 65) Auckland, New Zealand
- School: Auckland Grammar School
- Occupation(s): Corporate and Commercial Lawyer

Rugby union career
- Position: Hooker
Provincial / State sides
Years	Team	Apps	(Points)
1985–90	Canterbury	100	
International career
Years	Team	Apps	(Points)
1987	New Zealand	0	(0)

John Alexander Shepherd Buchan (born 17 June 1961) is a former New Zealand rugby union player. A hooker, Buchan represented Canterbury at a provincial level, and was a member of the New Zealand national side, the All Blacks, in 1987. He played two matches for the All Blacks on their tour of Japan that year but did not play in any tests.
