= Structure of rugby union in New Zealand =

The structure of rugby union in New Zealand describes the organisation of rugby union competitions and representative teams administered by New Zealand Rugby (NZR). Rugby union in New Zealand operates through an interconnected pathway beginning with community club rugby and progressing through provincial, professional and international levels. The sport is administered nationally by New Zealand Rugby and locally by 26 affiliated provincial unions.

New Zealand's domestic rugby structure consists of community club competitions administered by provincial unions, national provincial competitions including the National Provincial Championship (NPC), Heartland Championship, Farah Palmer Cup, 1st XV and national age-grade competitions. Professional rugby is played in Super Rugby Pacific and Super Rugby Aupiki, while the country's elite players represent the national teams, including the All Blacks and Black Ferns.

Unlike many rugby-playing nations where clubs compete directly in fully professional domestic leagues, New Zealand's professional game is based on regional franchises, while provincial unions continue to administer representative rugby and community competitions within their geographical boundaries.

== Administration ==
New Zealand Rugby is the governing body for rugby union in New Zealand. Founded in 1892 as the New Zealand Rugby Football Union (NZRFU), the organisation is responsible for the administration, promotion and development of the sport throughout the country. It governs national representative teams, domestic competitions, referee and coaching programmes, player development pathways and high-performance rugby.

New Zealand Rugby has 26 affiliated provincial unions, each of which administers rugby within a defined geographical area. Provincial unions organise community club competitions, school representative programmes and provincial representative teams.

The professional game is administered in partnership with the five New Zealand-based Super Rugby franchises. Although each franchise was originally established from groups of provincial unions, players are selected nationally through professional contracting rather than being restricted to their home province.

== Competition pathway ==
The New Zealand rugby pathway enables players to progress from community rugby through provincial and professional competitions to international representative honours.

Because the domestic calendar is staged throughout the year, many players represent both a club and a provincial team in the same season, while contracted professional players generally compete in Super Rugby before returning to represent their provincial union in the NPC or Farah Palmer Cup.

General competition pathway
Stage	Principal competitions	Administered by
International	All Blacks, Black Ferns, Māori All Blacks, All Blacks XV, New Zealand Under-20, New Zealand Sevens	New Zealand Rugby
Professional	Super Rugby Pacific, Super Rugby Aupiki	New Zealand Rugby / Super Rugby organisations
Provincial representative	National Provincial Championship, Heartland Championship, Farah Palmer Cup	New Zealand Rugby
Community	Premier club competitions, reserve grades, junior rugby, women's club rugby	26 Provincial Unions, 500+ Clubs
School	1st XV, 2nd XV, Age Grades, specific Weight-Restricted Grades	Provincial unions and secondary school sports associations

== National representative rugby ==
New Zealand Rugby administers numerous national representative teams for men and women across senior, development and age-grade levels.

=== Men ===
The senior men's national representative team is the All Blacks, one of the most successful teams in international rugby. Beneath the All Blacks are several representative teams including:

- All Blacks XV
- Māori All Blacks
- New Zealand Under-20
- All Blacks Sevens

These teams provide opportunities for player development while representing New Zealand in international competitions and tours.

=== Women ===
The senior women's representative team is the Black Ferns, multiple-time Rugby World Cup champions.

Other national women's teams include:

- Black Ferns XV
- Black Ferns Sevens
- New Zealand Under-20 Women

The expansion of women's professional rugby through Super Rugby Aupiki and the Farah Palmer Cup has strengthened the pathway from club rugby to the Black Ferns.

== Professional rugby ==
Professional rugby in New Zealand is centred on the Super Rugby Pacific and Super Rugby Aupiki competitions. These competitions provide the primary high-performance pathway between provincial representative rugby and international rugby. The country's professional players are centrally contracted by New Zealand Rugby, which also retains ownership of the intellectual property associated with the five men's Super Rugby franchises.

Unlike domestic league systems in many countries, New Zealand's professional teams are regional franchises rather than provincial unions. Players may represent one provincial union in the National Provincial Championship while being contracted to a different Super Rugby franchise.

=== Super Rugby Pacific ===
Super Rugby Pacific is the premier professional rugby union competition in the Southern Hemisphere. Since 2022 it has been jointly administered by New Zealand Rugby and Rugby Australia, featuring teams from New Zealand, Australia and the Pacific.

New Zealand has five professional franchises:

Franchise	Home region	First season	Primary home venue
Blues	Auckland and upper North Island	1996	Eden Park
Chiefs	Waikato/Bay of Plenty region	1996	Waikato Stadium
Hurricanes	Lower North Island	1996	Hnry Stadium
Crusaders	Canterbury and upper South Island	1996	Te Kaha Stadium
Highlanders	Lower South Island	1996	Forsyth Barr Stadium

Originally, each franchise represented a fixed group of provincial unions known as a catchment. While these historical affiliations remain significant for talent identification and supporter identity, player eligibility is now determined through the professional contracting system rather than provincial qualification.

=== Franchise catchments ===
Historically, each Super Rugby franchise represented the following provincial unions:

Franchise	Provincial unions
Blues	Auckland, North Harbour, Northland
Chiefs	Bay of Plenty, Counties Manukau, King Country, Thames Valley, Taranaki, Waikato
Hurricanes	East Coast, Hawke's Bay, Horowhenua-Kapiti, Manawatū, Poverty Bay, Wairarapa Bush, Wellington, Wanganui
Crusaders	Buller, Canterbury, Mid Canterbury, South Canterbury, Tasman, West Coast
Highlanders	North Otago, Otago, Southland

Although these relationships continue to underpin player development and academy programmes, professional players are no longer required to represent a provincial union within a franchise's historical catchment.

=== Competition format ===
Super Rugby Pacific is contested annually between February and June. Teams play a regular season followed by a finals series to determine the competition champion. The exact format has varied since the competition was restructured in 2022 following the admission of the Fijian Drua and Moana Pasifika.

The competition serves as the highest level of provincial professional rugby available to New Zealand players and forms the principal selection pathway to the All Blacks.

=== Super Rugby Aupiki ===
Super Rugby Aupiki is New Zealand's premier professional women's rugby union competition. It was established in 2022 to provide a professional pathway between the Farah Palmer Cup and the Black Ferns.

The competition consists of four teams:

Team	Region represented
Blues	Auckland, Northland and Counties Manukau
Chiefs Manawa	Waikato, Bay of Plenty and Taranaki
Hurricanes Poua	Wellington and Manawatū
Matatū	South Island

Super Rugby Aupiki is played annually and culminates in a Grand Final. Since 2026, the competition has been aligned with the international women's rugby calendar and concludes with a trans-Tasman championship match against the winner of Australia's Super Rugby Women's competition.

=== Player contracting ===
New Zealand Rugby operates a central contracting model for elite players. Most All Blacks and Black Ferns are contracted by NZR while also representing a Super Rugby franchise and a provincial union during the domestic season. This model enables player workload management and provides consistency across the national high-performance programme.

Professional players typically compete in Super Rugby between February and June before returning to their provincial unions for the National Provincial Championship or Farah Palmer Cup later in the year. This seasonal progression allows players to represent both professional franchises and provincial unions within the same calendar year.

== Provincial Rugby ==
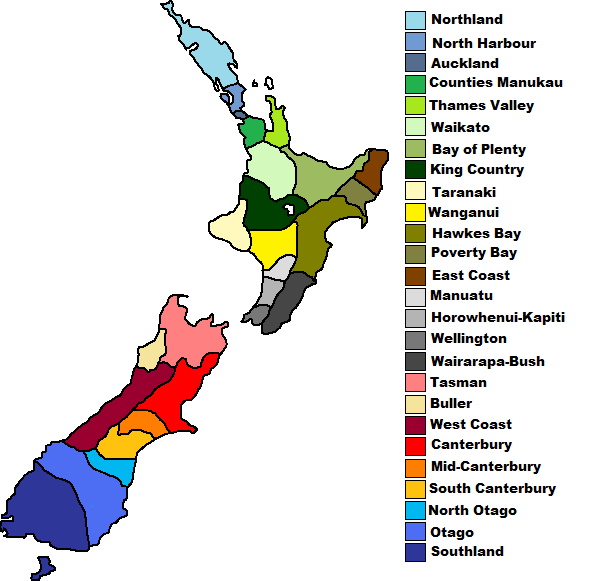
Map of all provincial unions within New Zealand.

New Zealand Rugby comprises 26 provincial unions, each responsible for administering rugby within its region, including club competitions, representative teams, referee appointments and player development. Provincial unions also oversee junior representative and secondary school rugby programmes.

Provincial representative rugby forms the primary link between community rugby and the professional game. Provincial unions select representative teams to compete in New Zealand Rugby's national provincial competitions, which are played after the Super Rugby season and feature players from community clubs, professional franchises and, occasionally, international representatives.

The provincial unions remain the foundation of rugby administration in New Zealand and continue to play a central role in player development despite the introduction of professional franchise rugby in 1996.

New Zealand Rugby currently administers four principal national provincial competitions:

- National Provincial Championship (NPC)
- Heartland Championship
- Farah Palmer Cup
- Under 85kg National Club Cup

=== National Provincial Championship ===
The National Provincial Championship (NPC) is the premier men's provincial rugby union competition in New Zealand and the second-highest level of rugby after Super Rugby Pacific. The competition was established in 1976 and has undergone numerous structural and sponsorship changes throughout its history.

The competition is played annually between late July and October, concluding with a knockout finals series to determine the national champion.

==== Participating unions ====
Provincial Union	Representative Team	Est.
Auckland	Gulls	1883
Bay of Plenty	Steamers	1911
Canterbury	Red & Blacks	1879
Counties Manukau	Steelers	1955
Hawke's Bay	Magpies	1884
Manawatū	Turbos	1886
North Harbour	Hibiscus	1985
Northland	Taniwha	1920
Otago	Razorbacks	1881
Southland	Stags	1887
Taranaki	Bulls	1885
Tasman	Mako	2006
Waikato	Mooloo	1921
Wellington	Lions	1879

==== Ranfurly Shield ====
In addition to the NPC title, provincial unions compete for the Ranfurly Shield, one of New Zealand rugby's oldest and most prestigious trophies. Unlike the NPC championship, the Ranfurly Shield is contested on a challenge basis. The holder must defend the Shield in designated home fixtures, most of which occur during the NPC season. Heartland Championship unions are also eligible to issue challenges, allowing the Shield to move between competitions.

=== Heartland Championship ===
The Heartland Championship is the national provincial competition for New Zealand's predominantly amateur provincial unions. It was established in 2006 following the restructuring of the National Provincial Championship and is contested annually by twelve provincial unions.

The competition preserves representative rugby in many rural and regional communities and remains an important pathway for players, coaches and match officials.

==== Participating unions ====
Provincial Union	Representative Team	Est.
Buller	Red Devils	1894
East Coast	Sky Blues	1922
Horowhenua Kapiti	Green and Golds / The Kapiti	1997
King Country	Rams	1922
Mid Canterbury	The Hammers / The Mighty Green and Gold	1927
North Otago	Old Golds / The Razorbacks	1904
Poverty Bay	Weka	1890
South Canterbury	Green and Blacks	1888
Thames Valley	Swamp Foxes	1922
Wairarapa Bush	Green Machine	1971
Wanganui	Butcher Boys	1888
West Coast	Whitepointers	1896

==== Trophies ====
The Heartland Championship awards three major honours:

- Meads Cup – contested by the leading teams following the regular season.
- Lochore Cup – contested by the remaining qualifying teams.
- Bill Osborne Taonga – a challenge trophy defended throughout the regular season in a similar manner to the Ranfurly Shield.

=== Farah Palmer Cup ===
The Farah Palmer Cup (FPC) is New Zealand's premier women's provincial rugby competition. It was established in 1999 as the Women's Provincial Championship before being renamed in 2016 in honour of former Black Ferns captain Farah Palmer.

The competition provides the principal pathway to Super Rugby Aupiki and the Black Ferns.

Beginning in the 2026 season, the competition consists of twelve provincial unions divided into two pools of six teams. Promotion and relegation were suspended during the transition to the revised competition structure.

==== Teams ====
Premiership	Championship
Auckland Storm	Hawke's Bay Tui
Bay of Plenty Volcanix	North Harbour Hibiscus
Canterbury	Northland Kauri
Counties Manukau Heat	Otago Spirit
Manawatū Cyclones	Tasman
Waikato	Wellington Pride

==== JJ Stewart Trophy ====
Alongside the championship title, Farah Palmer Cup teams compete for the JJ Stewart Trophy. Like the Ranfurly Shield, it is defended by the holder in designated home fixtures throughout the regular season.

=== Under 85kg National Club Cup ===
The Under 85kg National Club Cup is New Zealand Rugby's national knockout competition for weight-restricted club rugby teams. Introduced in 2020, it has rapidly grown into one of the country's largest community rugby competitions, attracting clubs from throughout New Zealand.

The competition is contested on a knockout basis, with affiliated clubs entering teams composed of players weighing no more than 85 kilograms. The final is played at a neutral venue and has become a showcase event for weight-restricted rugby.

The competition has contributed to increased participation in community rugby by providing an alternative pathway for players who may not otherwise compete in traditional senior grades.

=== Relationship between competitions ===
The men's provincial pathway generally follows a seasonal progression from Super Rugby Pacific to the National Provincial Championship or Heartland Championship. Many professional players return to represent their provincial unions following the completion of the Super Rugby season.

Similarly, elite women's players typically compete in Super Rugby Aupiki before representing their provincial unions in the Farah Palmer Cup later in the year. This integrated calendar enables players to participate in both professional and provincial competitions within the same season while maintaining eligibility for national representative selection.

== Community rugby ==
Community rugby forms the foundation of rugby union in New Zealand. It encompasses senior and junior club competitions, school rugby, age-grade rugby, women's rugby, social rugby and referee and coach development programmes. Community rugby is administered by the country's 26 provincial unions under the regulations and policies of New Zealand Rugby (NZR).

More than 500 affiliated rugby clubs operate throughout New Zealand, ranging from small rural clubs to large metropolitan organisations. Clubs provide opportunities for players of all ages and abilities, and many have histories dating back to the nineteenth century.

=== Club rugby ===
Club rugby is organised independently by each provincial union. Although competition formats differ between unions, most operate a hierarchical structure consisting of:

- Premier
- Premier Reserve
- Senior
- Under-21 or Colts
- Under-19
- Women's Premier
- Women's Development
- Social and Presidents grades

Promotion and relegation between grades exists in many unions, although competition formats vary according to the number of affiliated clubs and local playing requirements.

Premier club rugby represents the highest level of community rugby in New Zealand. Strong performances at Premier level are the primary pathway to provincial representative selection.

=== Major premier club competitions ===
Several provincial unions administer long-established premier competitions which are regarded among the strongest club competitions in the country.

Provincial Union	Premier competition
Auckland	Gallaher Shield
Canterbury	Christchurch Premier Competition
Wellington	Jubilee Cup
Waikato	Breweries Shield
Bay of Plenty	Baywide Premier
Counties Manukau	McNamara Cup
Hawke's Bay	Maddison Trophy
North Harbour	North Harbour Premier Competition
Otago	Dunedin Premier Competition
Southland	Galbraith Shield

Several clubs have achieved national recognition through sustained success in provincial competitions, including Ponsonby RFC, University of Canterbury RFC, Marist St. Patrick RFC, Hamilton Marist RFC, College Rifles RFC and Petone Rugby Football Club.

=== Women's club rugby ===
Women's club rugby has expanded significantly since the 1990s and is now administered by all 26 provincial unions. Most unions operate Premier Women's competitions together with development grades and junior girls' competitions.

Elite club players may progress to provincial representation in the Farah Palmer Cup, professional contracts in Super Rugby Aupiki, and ultimately selection for the Black Ferns.

== School rugby ==
School rugby has long been one of the principal development pathways for elite New Zealand players. Competitions are administered locally by provincial unions, regional secondary school sports organisations and school associations.

Most secondary schools field multiple teams, with the premier First XV competition regarded as the highest level of school rugby. Traditional rugby schools such as Auckland Grammar School, Hamilton Boys' High School, Christchurch Boys' High School, Palmerston North Boys' High School, Napier Boys' High School, St Patrick's College, Silverstream, Wellington College, King's College, Auckland and Sacred Heart College, Auckland have produced numerous All Blacks and Black Ferns.

Premier 1st XV School Rugby Competitions	Provincial Union
North Harbour 1st XV 1A	Northland, North Harbour
Auckland 1st XV 1A	Auckland
Central North Island 1st XV	Counties Manukau, Waikato, Hawke's Bay, Bay Of Plenty, Taranaki
Super 8 1st XV	Waikato, Hawke's Bay, Bay Of Plenty, Taranaki, Manawatū, Ngati Porou East Coast
Miles Toyota Premiership	Tasman, Canterbury
Southern Schools Rugby Championship	Otago, Southland
South Island Boys' Schools Network 1st XV Competition	Tasman, Canterbury, Otago, Southland

== Age-grade rugby ==
New Zealand Rugby administers age-grade rugby through nationally consistent participation policies while allowing provincial unions flexibility in local competition formats.

Junior rugby generally consists of:

- Small Blacks (ages 5–12)
- Intermediate grades
- Secondary school competitions
- Colts (Under-19 and Under-21)

The Small Blacks programme introduces players to rugby through modified versions of the game emphasising enjoyment, safety and skill development before progressing to the full fifteen-a-side game.

=== Representative pathway ===
Representative rugby begins at age-grade level through provincial and regional selection programmes.

Typical representative progression is:

Representative pathway
Level	Representative teams
National	New Zealand Under-20 New Zealand Schools New Zealand Schools Barbarians New Zealand Universities
Regional	North Island South Island (where applicable) Regional academies
Provincial	Under-18 Under-19 Colts Women's age-grade teams
Community	Clubs and schools

Provincial unions operate talent identification programmes throughout the season, with outstanding players progressing into New Zealand Rugby High Performance academies and, ultimately, professional contracts.

== Referees and coaches ==
Community rugby officials are developed through programmes administered jointly by New Zealand Rugby and provincial unions.

Coach education follows nationally accredited courses covering player welfare, technical coaching and game management. Referee development programmes operate from community rugby through to provincial, Super Rugby and international appointments.

Volunteer coaches, referees and administrators play a central role in sustaining community rugby throughout New Zealand.

== Season calendar ==
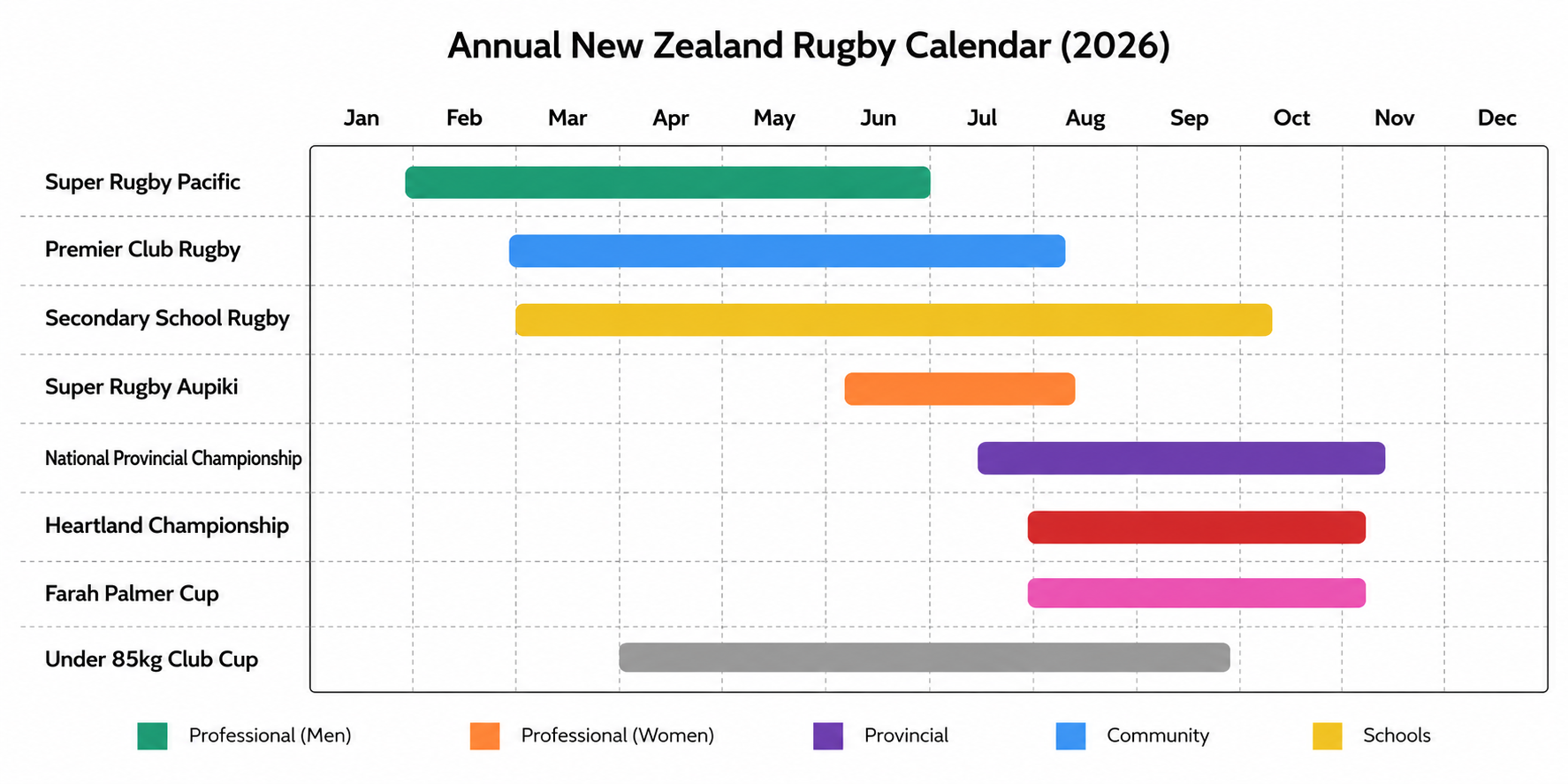

Although exact dates vary between competitions, the annual rugby calendar generally follows the pattern below.

Months	Competition
February–June	Super Rugby Pacific
February–April	Super Rugby Aupiki
March–July	Community club rugby
April–September	School rugby
July–October	National Provincial Championship
August–October	Heartland Championship
August–October	Farah Palmer Cup
Throughout year	Junior and age-grade rugby
