= Denis Cameron (rugby union) =

New Zealand rugby union player (1938–2025)

- Born: Denis Hugh Cameron; 17 November 1938 Ashburton, New Zealand
- Died: 22 August 2025 (aged 86) Christchurch, New Zealand
- Height: 1.83 m (6 ft 0 in)
- Weight: 90 kg (198 lb)
- School: Ashburton College

Rugby union career
- Position: Wing three-quarter
Senior career
Years	Team	Apps	(Points)
1959	Mid Canterbury	7	(27)
1961–1963	Counties	13	(22)
International career
Years	Team	Apps	(Points)
- New Zealand

Denis Hugh Cameron (17 November 1938 – 22 August 2025) was a New Zealand rugby union player. Cameron played eight games in the position of wing three-quarter for the All Blacks on their 1960 tour of Australia and South Africa, but did not appear in any test matches.

Cameron died in Christchurch on 22 August 2025, at the age of 86.
