= Walter Drake =

New Zealand rugby union player (1879–1941)

- Born: Walter Augustus Drake; 21 February 1879 Christchurch, New Zealand
- Died: 27 January 1941 (aged 61) Christchurch, New Zealand
- School: Christchurch Boys' High School
- Occupation: Commercial traveller

Rugby union career
- Position: Loose forward
Provincial / State sides
Years	Team	Apps	(Points)
1898–1902	Canterbury	27	
International career
Years	Team	Apps	(Points)
1901	New Zealand	0	(0)

Walter Augustus Drake (21 February 1879 – 27 January 1941) was a New Zealand rugby union player. A loose forward, Drake represented Canterbury at a provincial level between 1898 and 1902. He played just one match for the New Zealand national side, against the touring New South Wales team at Athletic Park, Wellington in 1901. He later served as a Canterbury selector, and was a New Zealand selector in 1923.

Drake died in Christchurch on 27 January 1941, and was buried at Linwood Cemetery.
