= Toby Sheen =

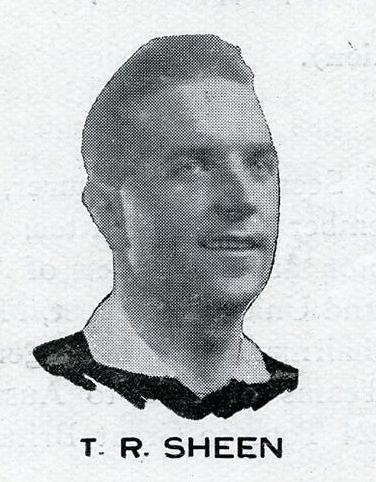
- Full name: Thomas Reginald Sheen
- Born: 29 March 1905 Waihi, New Zealand
- Died: 16 February 1979 (aged 73) Melbourne, Australia
- Height: 171 cm (5 ft 7 in)
- Weight: 71 kg (157 lb)

Rugby union career
- Position: Centre
Provincial / State sides
Years	Team	Apps	(Points)
- Auckland
International career
Years	Team	Apps	(Points)
1926–28	New Zealand		

Thomas Reginald Sheen (29 March 1905 – 16 February 1979) was a New Zealand international rugby union player.

== Biography ==
Sheen was born in Waihi and educated at Christ's College, Christchurch.

=== Rugby career ===
After moving to Auckland, Sheen played for King's College Old Boys and later College Rifles, from where he gained his first All Blacks call up in 1926 for a tour of Australia. He made his All Blacks debut in a warm up fixture against Wellington and picked up an injury which sidelined him for the early tour matches. His first opportunity on tour came in the match against Victoria in which he contributed one of the All Blacks' 14 tries in a comfortable win. He played only one further match and made his fourth All Blacks appearance against Auckland on their return home.

Sheen retained his All Blacks place for their next international series, a 1928 tour of South Africa. He struggled during the tour with a knee injury and only managed four uncapped appearances.

=== Later life ===
Immigrating to Australia, Sheen became director of a printing and paper company in Victoria.

== See also ==
- List of New Zealand national rugby union players
