= William Cummings (rugby union) =

- Born: 13 March 1889 Timaru, New Zealand
- Died: 28 May 1955 (aged 66) Christchurch, New Zealand
- Occupation: Newspaper delivery man

Rugby union career
- Position: Loose forward
Provincial / State sides
Years	Team	Apps	(Points)
1912–21	Canterbury	34	
International career
Years	Team	Apps	(Points)
1913, 1921	New Zealand	2	(3)

William Cummings (13 March 1889 – 28 May 1955) was a New Zealand rugby union player. A loose forward, Cummings represented Canterbury at a provincial level, and was a member of the New Zealand national side, the All Blacks, in 1913 and 1921. He played three matches for the All Blacks including two internationals, scoring one try.

Cummings died in Christchurch on 28 May 1955, and was buried at Bromley Cemetery.
