= George Scrimshaw (rugby union) =

New Zealand rugby union player

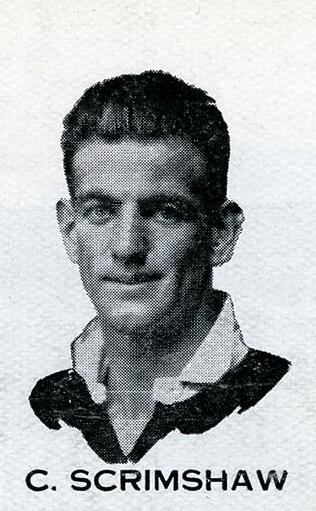
- Born: 1 December 1902 Islington, Christchurch, New Zealand
- Died: 13 July 1971 (aged 68) Christchurch, New Zealand
- Height: 1.83 m (6 ft 0 in)
- Weight: 76 kg (168 lb)
- School: Waitaki Boys' High School

Rugby union career
- Position: Wing-forward
Provincial / State sides
| Years | Team | Apps | (Points) |
| 1925–1930 | Canterbury | 30 | |
International career
| Years | Team | Apps | (Points) |
| 1928 | New Zealand | 1 | (0) |

George Scrimshaw (1 December 1902 – 13 July 1971) was a New Zealand rugby union player. A wing-forward, Scrimshaw represented Canterbury at a provincial level. He was a member of the New Zealand national side, the All Blacks, on their 1928 tour of South Africa, playing in 11 matches, including one international.
