= Bob Duff (rugby union) =

New Zealand rugby player (1925–2006)

- Born: Robert Hamilton Duff; 5 August 1925 Lyttelton, New Zealand
- Died: 11 May 2006 (aged 80) Christchurch, New Zealand
- Height: 1.90 m (6 ft 3 in)
- Weight: 105 kg (231 lb)
- School: Lyttelton District High School; Christchurch Boys' High School
- Occupation: Accountant

Rugby union career
- Position: Lock
Provincial / State sides
Years	Team	Apps	(Points)
1945–1957	Canterbury	99	
International career
Years	Team	Apps	(Points)
1951–1956	New Zealand	11	(0)
Coaching career
- Years: Team
- 1972–1973: New Zealand

Robert Hamilton Duff JP (5 August 1925 – 11 May 2006) was a New Zealand rugby union player and coach. A lock, Duff represented Canterbury at a provincial level, and was a member of the New Zealand national side, the All Blacks, from 1951 to 1956. He played 18 matches for the All Blacks, two of which were as captain, including 11 internationals. He later was coach of the All Blacks from 1972 to 1973.

Duff was elected as a member of the Lyttelton Borough Council, and served as deputy mayor for 12 years. He was also a justice of the peace—the youngest in the country at the time of his appointment—and between 1984 and 1994 served as a member of the New Zealand Racing Authority.

Sporting positions
Preceded by Pat Vincent	All Blacks captain 1956	Succeeded by Ponty Reid
Preceded by Ivan Vodanovich	All Blacks coach 1972–1973	Succeeded by JJ Stewart
