= Archie McCormick =

New Zealand rugby union player (1899-1969)

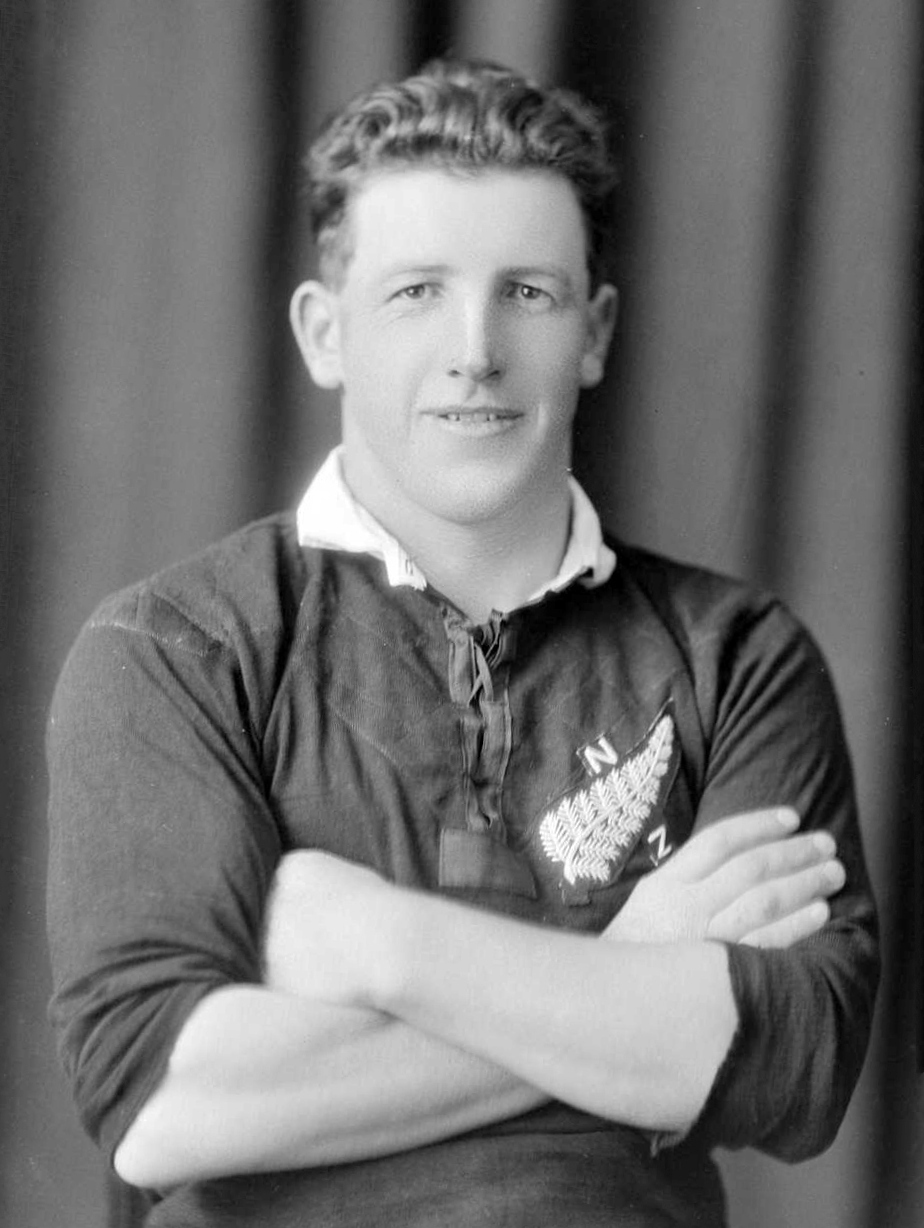
- McCormick in 1925
- Born: Archibald George McCormick; 23 February 1899 Christchurch, New Zealand
- Died: 8 February 1969 (aged 69) Christchurch, New Zealand
- Height: 1.78 m (5 ft 10 in)
- Weight: 89 kg (196 lb)
- Notable relative(s): Fergie McCormick (son); Andrew McCormick (grandson)

Rugby union career
- Position: Hooker
Provincial / State sides
Years	Team	Apps	(Points)
1924–26	Canterbury	10	
1927–30	Ashburton County	12	
International career
Years	Team	Apps	(Points)
1925	New Zealand	0	(0)

Archibald George McCormick (23 February 1899 – 8 February 1969) was a New Zealand rugby union player. A hooker, McCormick represented Canterbury and Ashburton County at a provincial level. After playing two games for Canterbury in 1924, McCormick was selected for the New Zealand national side, the All Blacks, on their 1925 tour of New South Wales but, as one of three hookers in the touring party, only played in one match. He did not appear in any Test matches.

He was also the national amateur heavyweight boxing champion in 1922 and 1923.
