= Ross Smith (rugby union) =

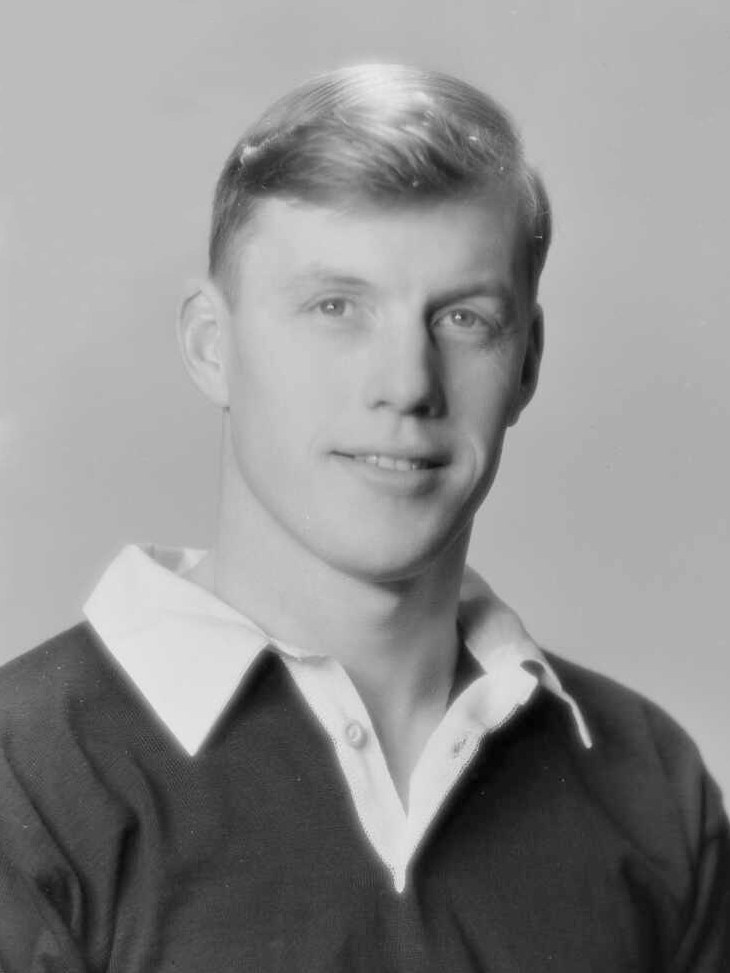
- Born: Ross Mervyn Smith; 21 April 1929 Ashburton, New Zealand
- Died: 2 May 2002 (aged 73) Auckland, New Zealand
- Height: 1.83 m (6 ft 0 in)
- Weight: 79 kg (174 lb)
- School: Timaru Boys' High School
- Notable relative: Alan Robilliard (uncle)

Rugby union career
- Position: Wing
Provincial / State sides
Years	Team	Apps	(Points)
1948–60	Canterbury	137	(279)
International career
Years	Team	Apps	(Points)
1955	New Zealand	1	(0)

Ross Mervyn Smith (21 April 1929 – 2 May 2002) was a New Zealand rugby union player. A wing three-quarter, Smith represented Canterbury at a provincial level, and was the first New Zealand player to score 100 first-class tries. He played just one match for the New Zealand national side, the All Blacks, a test against the touring Australian team in 1955. He later served as a selector for the Hawke's Bay (1973–75) and Nelson Bays (1976) unions.
