= Lance Johnson (rugby union) =

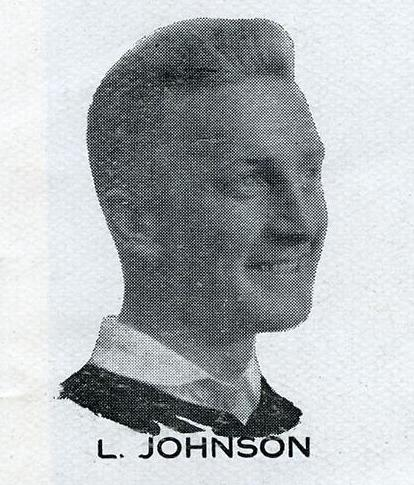
- Born: Launcelot Matthew Johnson; 9 August 1897 Lumsden, New Zealand
- Died: 11 January 1983 (aged 85) Christchurch, New Zealand
- Height: 1.73 m (5 ft 8 in)
- Weight: 74 kg (163 lb)
- School: Southland Boys' High School
- Occupation: Accountant

Rugby union career
- Position(s): First five-eighth Second five-eighth
Provincial / State sides
Years	Team	Apps	(Points)
1923–25, 27–32	Wellington		
1926	Hawke's Bay		
International career
Years	Team	Apps	(Points)
1925, 1928, 1930	New Zealand	4	(0)

Launcelot Matthew "Lance" Johnson (9 August 1897 – 11 January 1983) was a New Zealand rugby union player. Equally comfortable at either first or second five-eighth, Johnson represented Wellington and Hawke's Bay at a provincial level, and was a member of the New Zealand national side, the All Blacks, in 1925, 1928 and 1930. He played 25 matches for the All Blacks, including four internationals. He served as a Canterbury selector from 1949 to 1950.

Johnson enlisted in the New Zealand Rifle Brigade in August 1917 with the rank of rifleman, and arrived in France in September 1918, two months before the end of World War I. During World War II he served as a warrant officer in the National Reserve between 1940 and 1943.
