= Alan Robilliard =

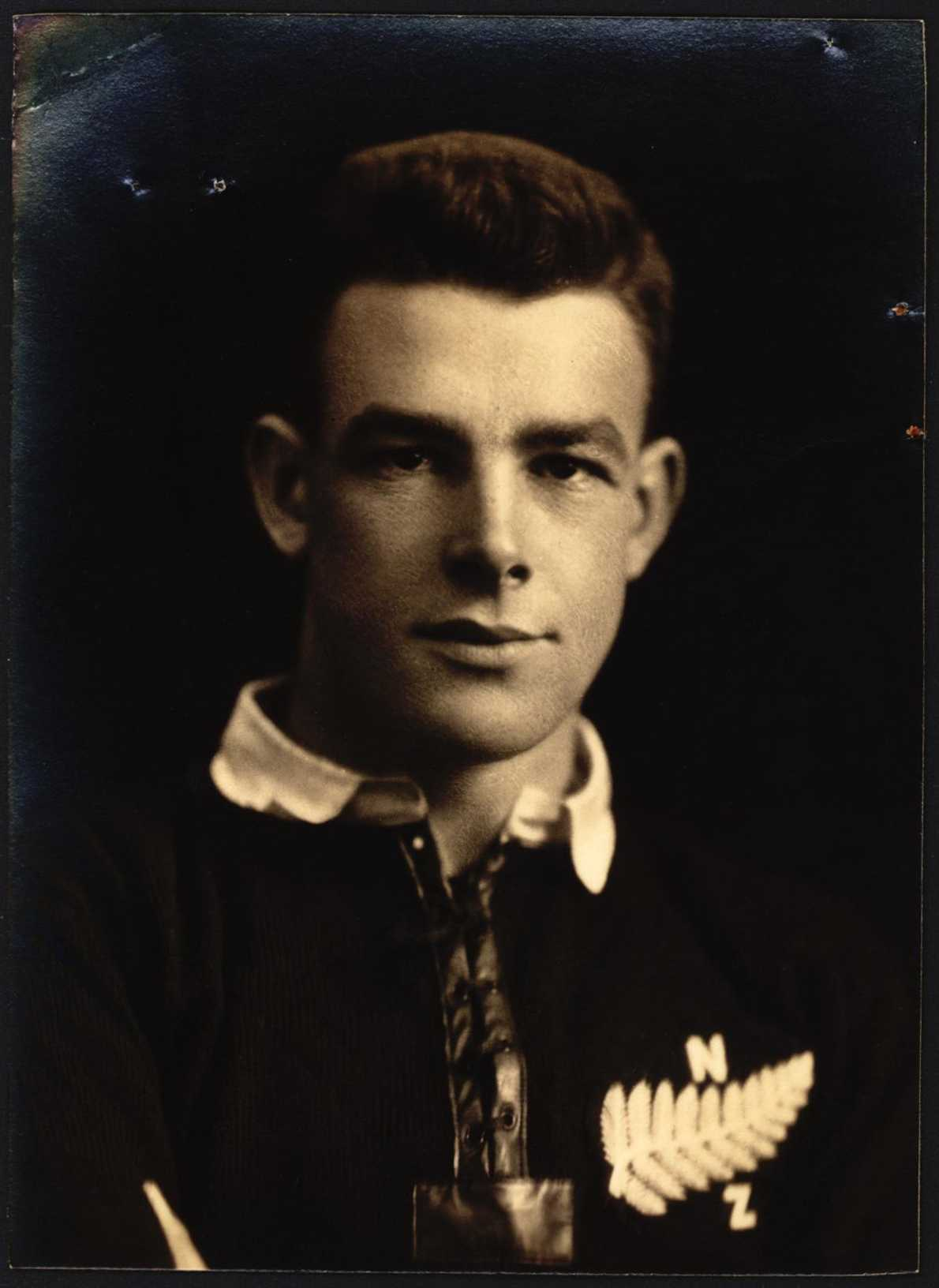
- Born: Alan Charles Compton Robilliard; 20 December 1903 Ashburton, New Zealand
- Died: 23 April 1990 (aged 87) Rakaia, New Zealand
- Height: 1.78 m (5 ft 10 in)
- Weight: 73 kg (161 lb)
- School: Ashburton High School
- Notable relative: Ross Smith (nephew)
- Occupation: Jeweller

Rugby union career
- Position: Wing
Provincial / State sides
Years	Team	Apps	(Points)
1923–27	Canterbury	26	
International career
Years	Team	Apps	(Points)
1924–28	New Zealand	4	(0)

Alan Charles Compton Robilliard (20 December 1903 – 23 April 1990) was a New Zealand rugby union player. A wing three-quarter, Robilliard represented Canterbury at a provincial level, and was a member of the New Zealand national side, the All Blacks, from 1924 to 1928. In his 27 matches for the All Blacks, three of which were internationals, he scored 25 tries.

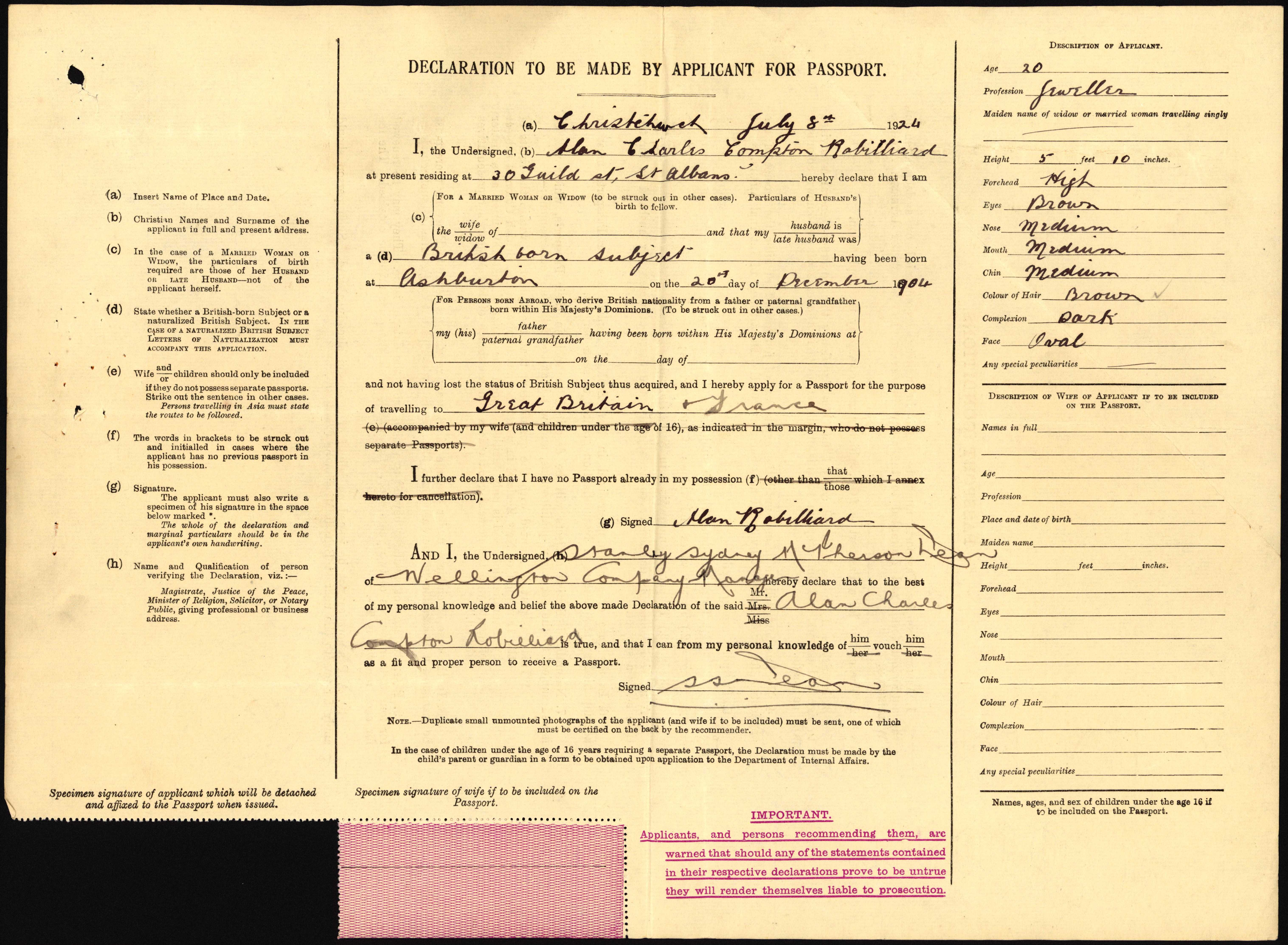
Alan Robilliard passport application
