= Sydney Carleton =

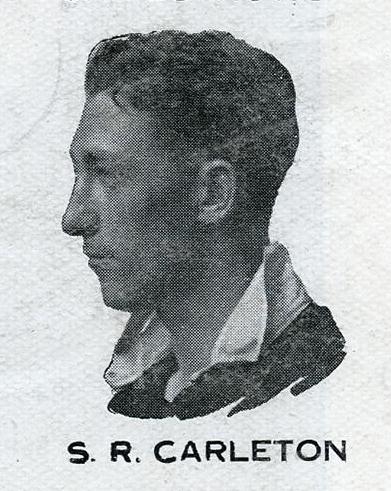
- Born: Sydney Russell Carleton; 22 February 1904 Christchurch, New Zealand
- Died: 23 October 1973 (aged 69) Christchurch, New Zealand
- Height: 1.78 m (5 ft 10 in)
- Weight: 75 kg (165 lb)
- School: Christchurch Boys' High School

Rugby union career
- Position: Utility back
Provincial / State sides
| Years | Team | Apps | (Points) |
| 1923–30 | Canterbury | 34 | |
International career
| Years | Team | Apps | (Points) |
| 1928–29 | New Zealand | 6 | (0) |

Sydney Russell Carleton (22 February 1904 – 23 October 1973) was a New Zealand rugby union player. A utility back, Carleton represented Canterbury at a provincial level, and was a member of the New Zealand national side, the All Blacks, in 1928 and 1929. In his 21 matches for the All Blacks, including six internationals, he scored two tries.
