= Harry Frost (rugby union) =

- Born: Harry Frost; 27 February 1869 Riccarton, Christchurch, New Zealand
- Died: 6 July 1954 (aged 85) Auckland, New Zealand
- School: Bromsgrove House School

Rugby union career
- Position: Forward
International career
Years	Team	Apps	(Points)
1894	New Zealand		

Harry Frost (27 February 1869 – 6 July 1954) was an All Blacks rugby union player from New Zealand. He was a forward.

He played one match for the All Blacks in 1896 against Queensland, when John (James) Swindley had to withdraw because of injury.

He played for Canterbury, and was a longterm sports administrator with the NZRFU (and the first New Zealand representative to become a life member, in 1939). He was born in Riccarton, Christchurch and died in Auckland.

Frost Road in Mount Roskill, Auckland, originally called Rugby Road, was named after him.
