= 1914 in New Zealand =

- Decades: 1890s; 1900s; 1910s; 1920s; 1930s
- See also: History of New Zealand; List of years in New Zealand; Timeline of New Zealand history

The following lists events that happened during 1914 in New Zealand.

New Zealand showed no hesitation in emulating Britain's declaration of war on Germany and entering World War I. New Zealand troops became the first to occupy German territory when they took over Samoa in November.

== Incumbents ==
=== Regal and viceregal ===
- Head of State – George V
- Governor – Arthur Foljambe, 2nd Earl of Liverpool
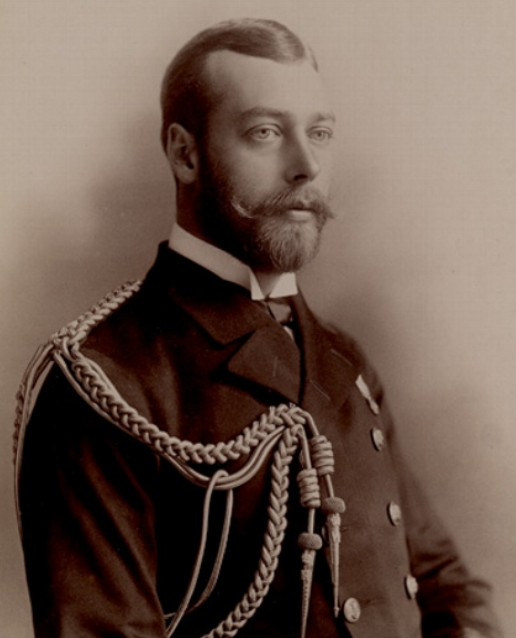
George V

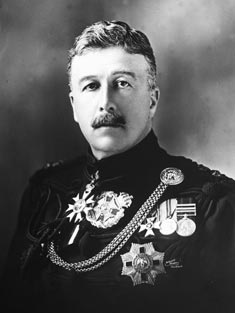
Lord Liverpool

=== Government ===
The 18th New Zealand Parliament concludes, and the Reform Party is returned for its second term of office following the 1914 general election on 10 December.

- Speaker of the House – Frederic Lang (Reform Party)
- Prime Minister – William Massey
- Minister of Finance – James Allen
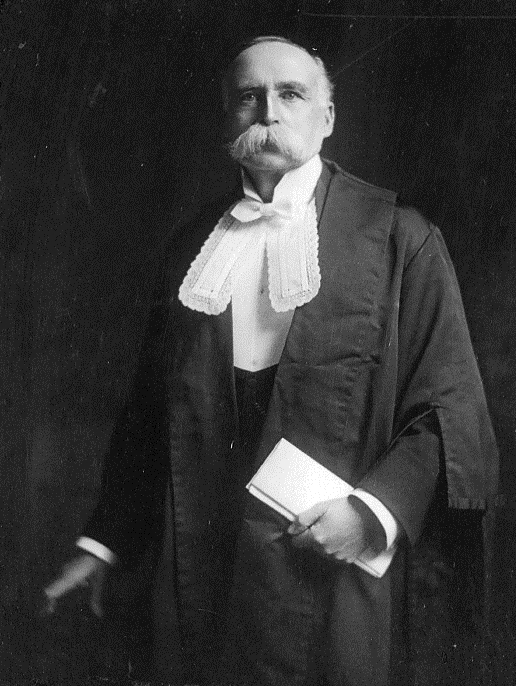
Frederic Lang

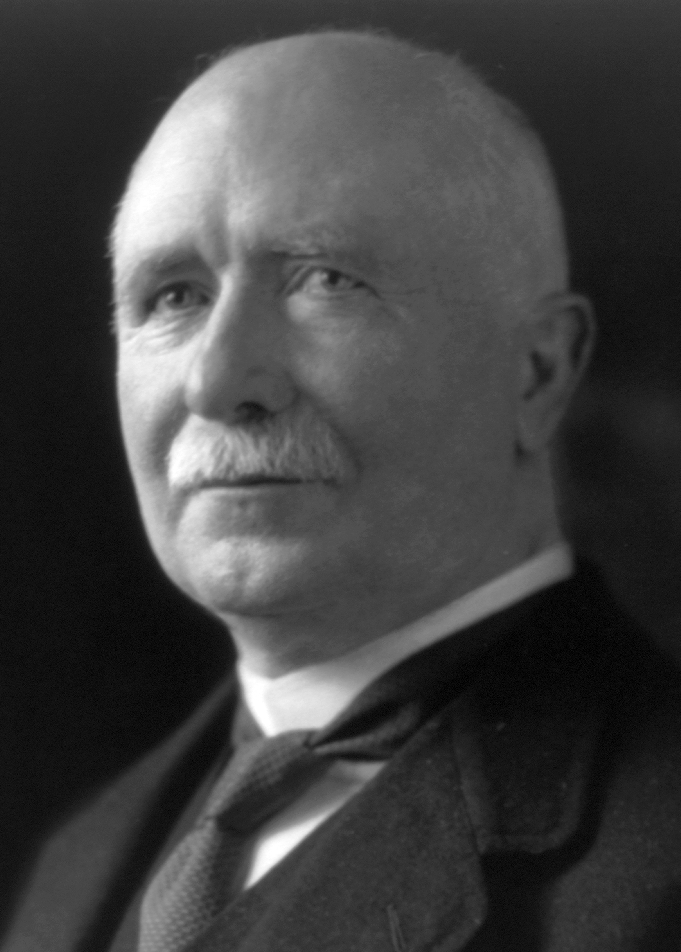
William Massey

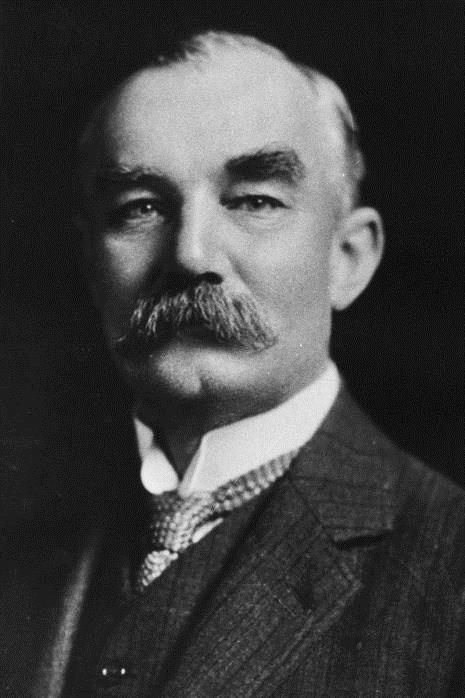
James Allen

=== Parliamentary opposition ===
- Leader of the Opposition – Joseph Ward (Liberal Party).
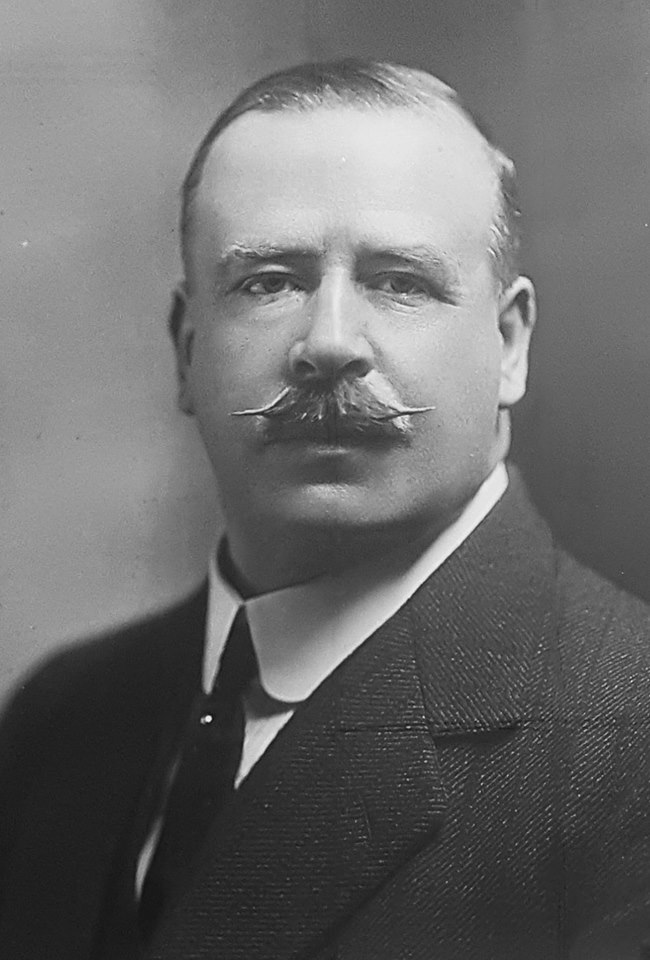
Joseph Ward

=== Judiciary ===
- Chief Justice – Sir Robert Stout
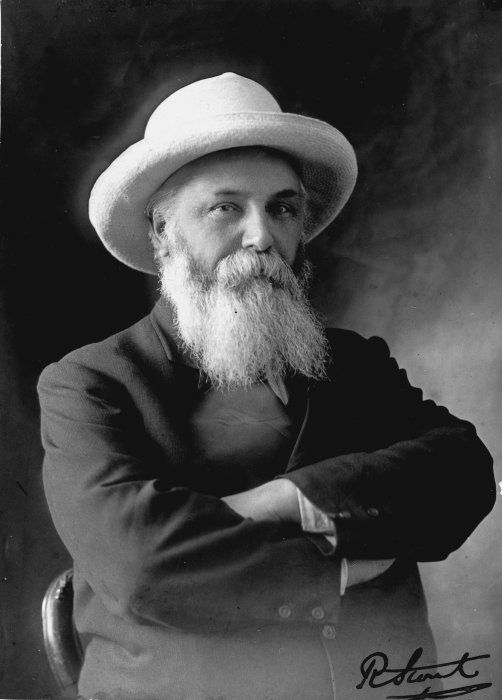
Robert Stout

=== Main centre leaders ===
- Mayor of Auckland – James Parr
- Mayor of Wellington – John Luke
- Mayor of Christchurch – Henry Holland
- Mayor of Dunedin – William Downie Stewart Jr, then John Shacklock
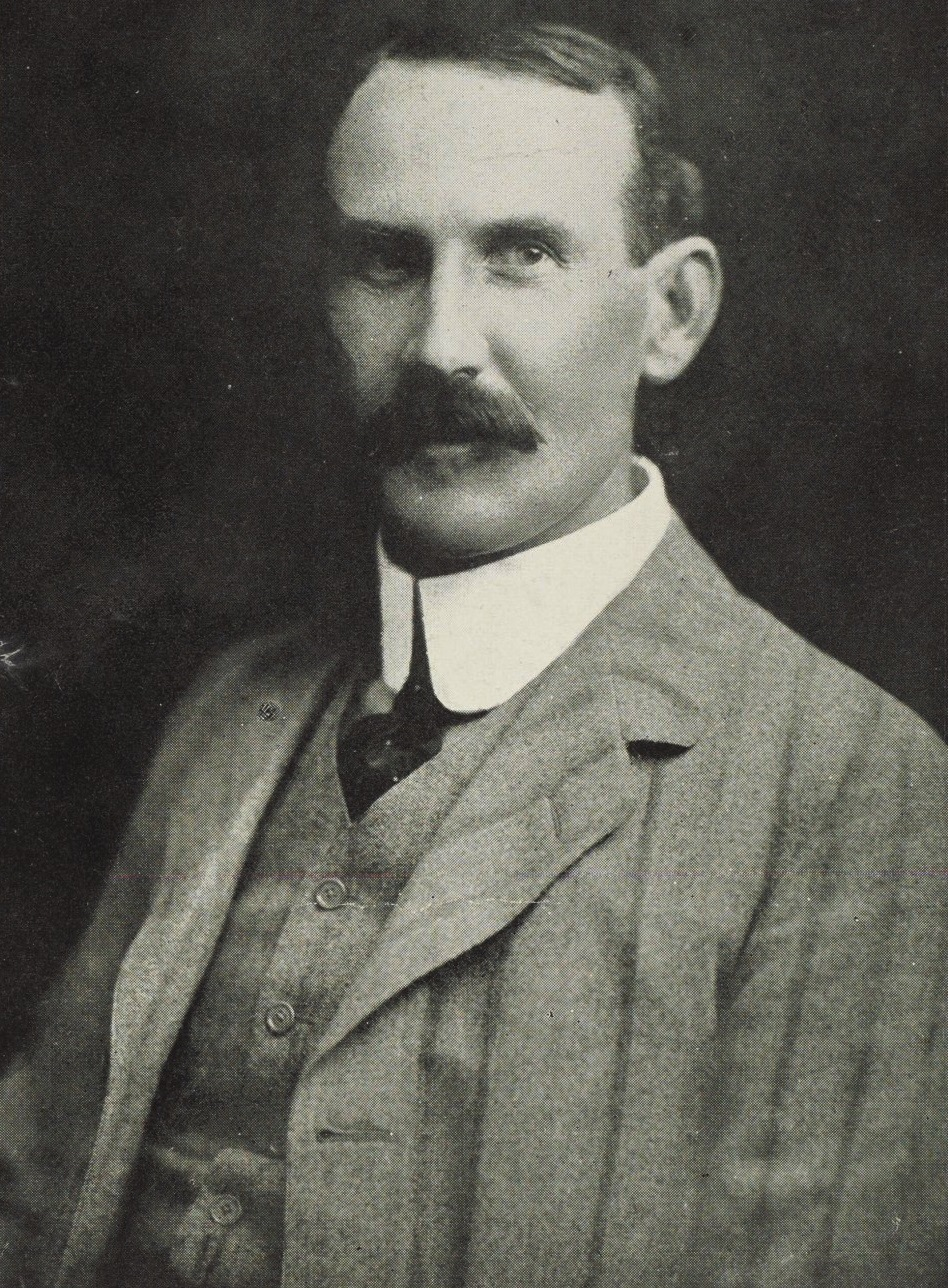
James Parr

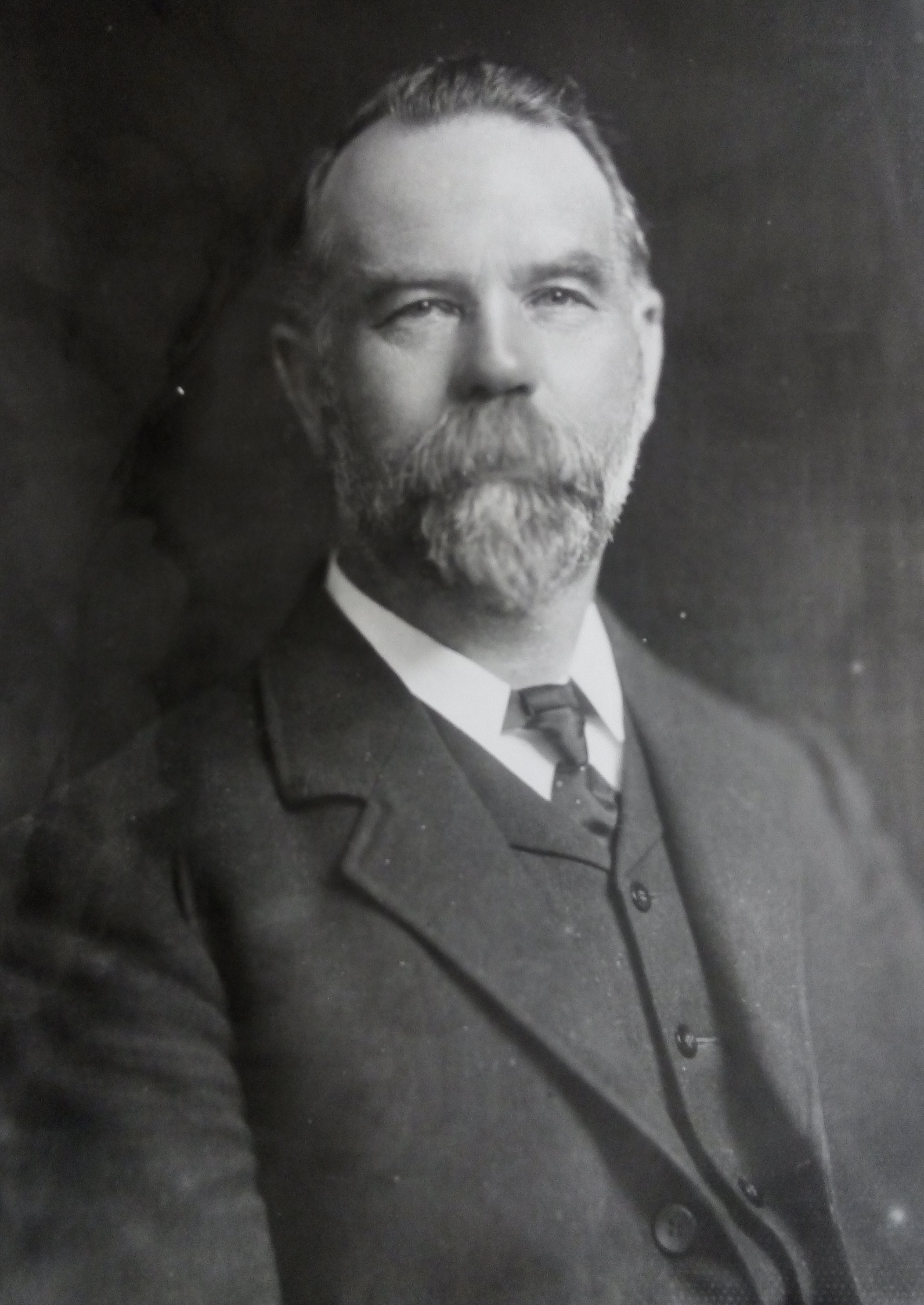
John Luke

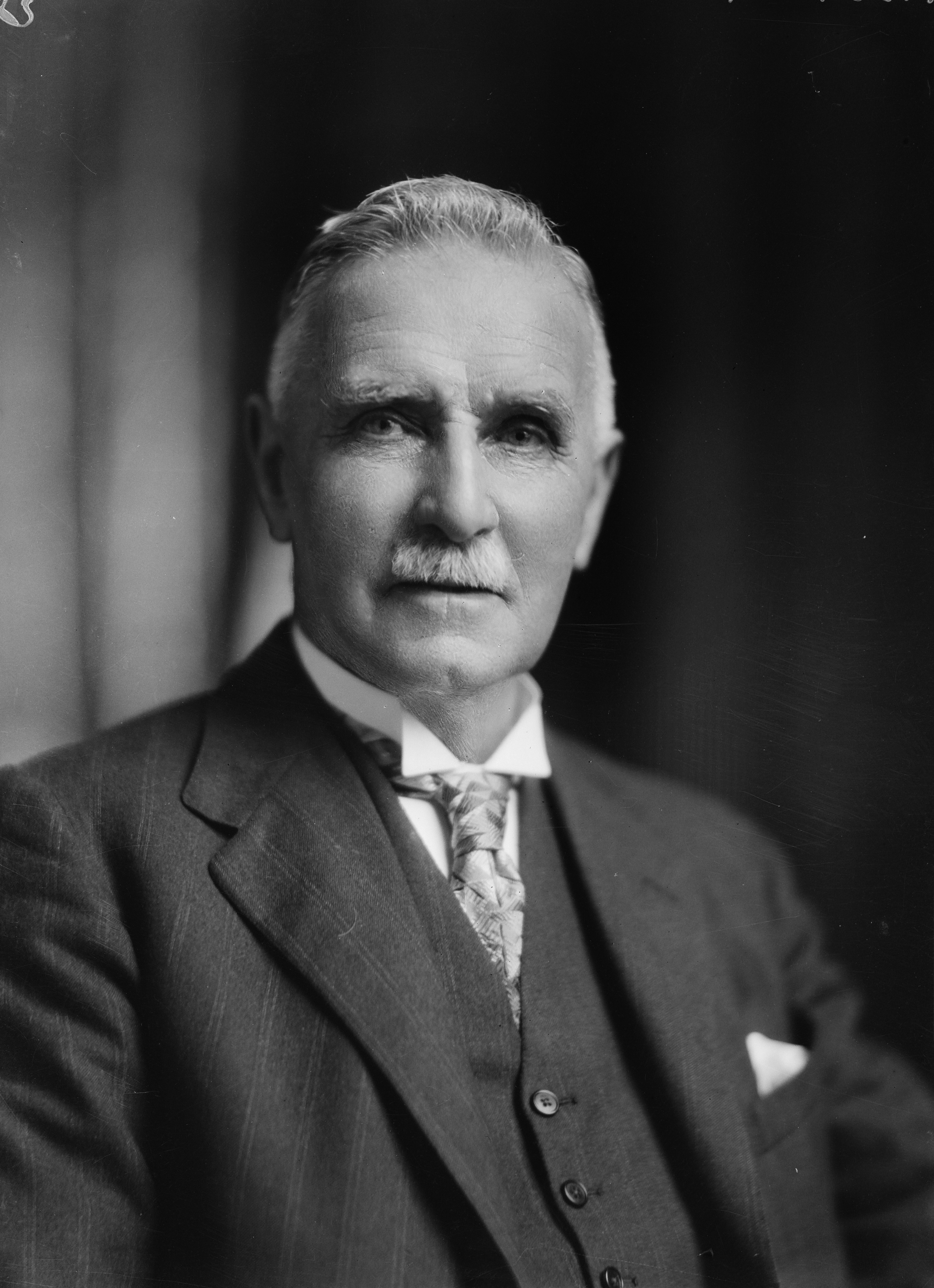
Henry Holland

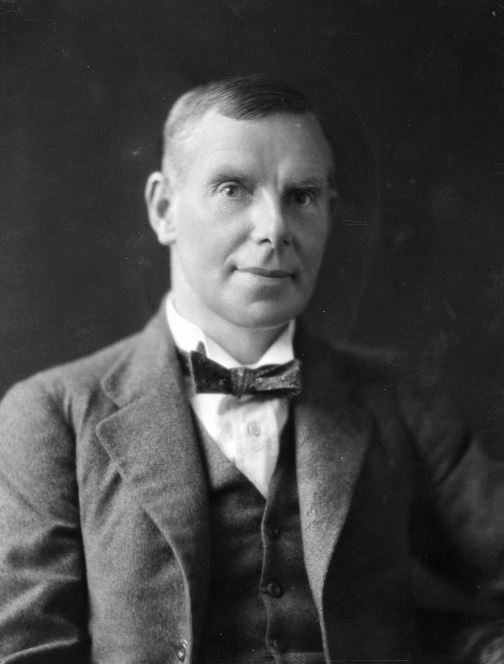
William Downie Stewart

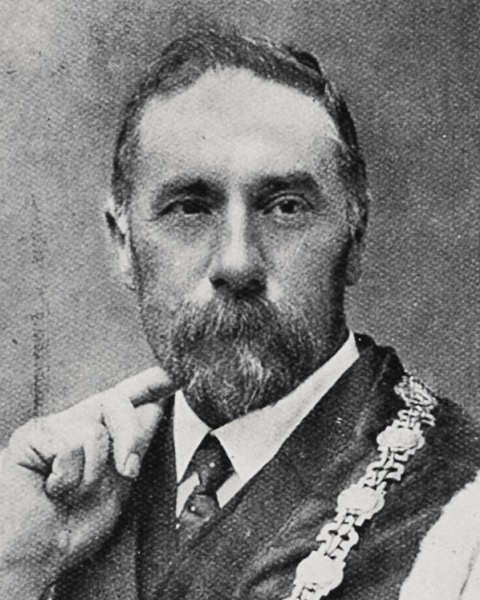
John Shacklock

== Events ==
- 17 January – Joseph Hammond is the first person to fly over Auckland city. He flies a Blériot monoplane (named Brittania) which has been donated to the New Zealand Government by the Imperial Air Fleet Committee, from Potter's Park (near One Tree Hill).
- 20 February – James William Humphrys Scotland makes the first substantial cross-country flight in New Zealand. He flies from Invercargill to Gore, a distance of 61 kilometres (38 mi), in 40 minutes in a Caudron biplane. He continues on to Dunedin, Timaru and Christchurch where he arrives on 6 March.
- 18 April – The Auckland Exhibition closes.
- 4 August – New Zealand declares war on Germany.
- 29 August – At the start of World War One, 1,374 New Zealand troops land in Samoa and are offered no resistance by German colonial forces. This is the second German territory (after Togoland) to be captured by the Allies.
- 25 September – The departure of the New Zealand Expeditionary Force (NZEF) for Europe is delayed due to concerns about the presence of German raiders.
- 7 October – A magnitude 6.6 earthquake strikes East Cape, Gisborne.
- 16 October – The main body of the NZEF, some 8000 troops, finally departs New Zealand for Australia where they will join with the First AIF.
- 28 October – Another earthquake, a magnitude 6.4, strikes Gisborne.
- 1 November – The 38 ships carrying the NZEF (10 ships) and the AIF (28 ships) leave Perth, Western Australia. Although expecting to sail to England, they will receive orders to land in Egypt while crossing the Indian Ocean.
- Early December – The NZEF and AIF land in Egypt.
- 10 December – The 1914 general election is held.

== Arts and literature ==
See 1914 in art, 1914 in literature, Category:1914 books

=== Music ===
See: 1914 in music

=== Film ===
- Hinemoa, the first feature film made in New Zealand, premieres at the Lyric Theatre, Auckland.

== Sport ==
=== Chess ===
- The 27th New Zealand Chess Championship is held in Auckland, and is won by W.E. Mason of Wellington, his fifth title.

=== Golf ===
- The eighth New Zealand Open championship is won by Ted Douglas (his second consecutive victory).
- The 22nd National Amateur Championships are held in Auckland:
  - Men – Arthur Duncan (Wellington) (eighth title)
  - Women – Mrs G. Williams (second title)

=== Horse racing ===
==== Harness racing ====
- New Zealand Trotting Cup – Win Soon
- Auckland Trotting Cup – Steel Bell

==== Thoroughbred racing ====
- New Zealand Cup – Warstep
- Auckland Cup – Warstep
- Wellington Cup – Kilrain
- New Zealand Derby – Balboa

=== Lawn bowls ===
The national outdoor lawn bowls championships are held in Dunedin.

- Men's singles champion – J.S. Kilgour (Carlton Bowling Club)
- Men's pair champions – J. Johnson, E. Harraway (skip) (Dunedin Bowling Club)
- Men's fours champions – W. Grenfell, A.E. Erksine, W.J. Thompson, J. Porteous (skip) (Wellington Bowling Club)

=== Rugby league ===
- During the 1914 Great Britain Lions tour of Australia and New Zealand, the Kiwis lose to Great Britain 16–13 in Auckland

=== Rugby union ===
- Taranaki defend the Ranfurly Shield against Wanganui (17–3), Manawatu (11–3), Horowhenua (14–3), Wairarapa (22–3), Canterbury (6–5) and Southland (6–0), before losing to Wellington (6–12).

=== Soccer ===
- Provincial league champions:
  - Auckland – Auckland Thistle
  - Canterbury – Sydenham
  - Hawke's Bay – Waipukurau
  - Otago – Northern
  - Southland – Rangers
  - Wanganui – Eastbrooke
  - Wellington – Wellington Corinthians

=== Tennis ===
- Anthony Wilding, partnered with Norman Brookes, wins the men's doubles at the Wimbledon Championship.
- The Davis Cup final is held in New York City. New Zealander Anthony Wilding and Australian Norman Brookes (playing as Australia rather than Australasia) beat the United States 3–2.

== Births ==
=== January–March ===
- 12 January –
  - Roy Jack, politician
  - Everard Jackson, rugby union player
- 22 January – Ron McLean, environmental campaigner
- 30 January – Bill Phillips, rugby union player
- 1 February – James Gould, rower
- 2 February – F. Russell Miller, politician
- 3 February – Felix Kelly, graphic designer, painter, illustrator
- 14 February – Jack Rankin, rugby union player
- 19 February – Thelma Kench, athlete
- 22 February – Theo Allen, athlete
- 7 March – Doreen Blumhardt, potter, arts educator
- 11 March – Dan Riddiford, politician
- 16 March – H. W. Gretton, poet, lyricist, diarist
- 19 March – Jack Best, rugby union player
- 24 March
  - Nancy Borlase, painter and art critic
  - Enid McElwee, fencer
- 27 March – Ces Burke, cricketer
- 31 March – David Seath, politician

=== April–June ===
- 2 April – Walter Whittlestone, dairy scientist, peace activist
- 30 April – Zena Daysh, human ecologist
- 5 May – Lloyd Trigg, World War II pilot, Victoria Cross recipient
- 8 May –
  - Gaven Donne, jurist
  - Dean Eyre, politician, diplomat
- 27 May – Graham Turbott, ornithologist, zoologist, museum director
- 30 May – Frank Sharpley, athlete
- 2 June – Joe Genet, wrestler
- 3 June –
  - Tommy Farnan, association football player
  - Reg Grant, World War II pilot
- 13 June – Gordon Patrick, cyclist
- 16 June – Theo de Lange, air force officer
- 20 June – Pearl Savin, cricketer
- 23 June – Clifford Richmond, jurist

=== July–September ===
- 4 July – Ray Speed, association football player
- 5 July – Jim Watt, rugby union player and paediatrician
- 9 July – M. K. Joseph, poet and novelist
- 13 July – Trevor Berghan, rugby union player
- 28 July –
  - Wiremu Te Āwhitu, first Māori Roman Catholic priest
  - Joey Sadler, rugby union player
- 7 August – Alice Bush, doctor, family planning activist
- 11 August – Donald Cobden, rugby union player, Battle of Britain pilot
- 21 August – Billie Fulford, cricketer
- 23 August – Jack Hemi, rugby union and rugby league player
- 27 August –
  - Gordon Christie, politician
  - Vernon Thomas, wrestler
- 2 September – Ron Barclay, politician

=== October–December ===
- 13 October – Cecil Matthews, athlete
- 17 October – Leo Schultz, politician
- 22 October – Pat Boot, athlete
- 23 October – Donald Stott, soldier, military intelligence agent
- 30 October – Pat Mackie, miner and trade unionist
- 7 November – Doug Freeman, cricketer
- 8 November – Guthrie Wilson, novelist and teacher
- 9 November – Colin Gray, World War II fighter ace
- 15 November – Jack Holloway, alpine explorer, forest ecologist
- 18 November – Bill Phillips, economist
- 1 December – Peter Mathieson, swimmer
- 4 December – Arthur Prior, logician and philosopher
- 10 December – Reginald Delargey, Roman Catholic bishop
- 21 December – Lankford Smith, association football player and cricketer
- 22 December – Adrian Hayter, soldier, sailor, Antarctic leader, author
- 25 December –
  - James Fletcher, industrialist
  - Don McRae, cricketer and association football player
  - Bob White, politician
- 27 December – Hilda Buck, cricketer
- 28 December – Norman King, politician
- 30 December – Ian Lythgoe, public servant

== Deaths ==
=== January–June ===
- 10 January – Samuel Hodgkinson, politician (born 1817)
- 2 February – Alfred Burton, photographer (born c.1834)
- 8 February – Irving Sayles, vaudeville entertainer (born 1872)
- 25 February – John Scott, medical academic, artist (born 1851)
- 28 February – Ann Boyce, herbalist (born 1827)
- 2 March – Mohi Tūrei, Ngāti Porou leader, Anglican minister, carver, haka composer (born c.1830)
- 18 March – Edwin Blake, politician (born 1830)
- 20 March – Henry Goulstone, banker, magistrate (born 1836)
- 10 June – Carbine, Thoroughbred racehorse (foaled 1885)

=== July–December ===
- 6 July – Charles Carter, Baptist missionary (born 1828)
- 21 July – John Blair Whyte, politician (born 1840)
- 30 July – Helen Gibb, farmer, accommodation-house keeper (born 1838)
- 16 August – Caroline Freeman, school teacher (born c.1856)
- 18 August – Thomas Young Duncan, politician (born 1836)
- 25 August –
  - William McLean, politician, New Zealand's first motor car owner (born 1845)
  - Patrick O'Reilly, Roman Catholic priest, educationalist (born 1843)
- 2 September – John Carruthers, civil engineer, economic theorist (born 1836)
- 29 September – Thomas Fergus, politician (born 1850)
  - Maria Atkinson, community leader (born 1824)
  - Matthew Green, politician (born 1840)
- 1 October – Richard Barcham Shalders, Baptist preacher, founder of YMCA in New Zealand (born 1824)
- 14 October – Walter Symes, politician (born 1852)
- 17 October – Kennedy Macdonald, politician (born 1847)
- 25 November – John Blair, businessman, politician, educational administrator (born 1843)
- 30 November – John Shand, university professor (born 1834)
- 21 December – William Montgomery, politician (born c.1821)
- 25 December – James Gow Black, chemist, mineralogist (born 1835)

=== Full date unknown ===
- Matutaera Nihoniho, a Ngāti Porou leader, soldier, storekeeper and assessor (born 1850)

== See also ==
- List of years in New Zealand
- Timeline of New Zealand history
- History of New Zealand
- Military history of New Zealand
- Timeline of the New Zealand environment
- Timeline of New Zealand's links with Antarctica
