= 1935–36 New Zealand rugby union tour of Britain, Ireland and Canada =

- Manager: Vincent Meredith
- Tour captain: Jack Manchester
Summary
P	W	D	L
Total
30	26	1	3
Test match
4	2	0	2
Opponent
P	W	D	L
Scotland
1	1	0	0
Ireland
1	1	0	0
Wales
1	0	0	1
England
1	0	0	1

== Matches ==
Scores and results list New Zealand's points tally first.

Opponent	For	Ag.	Date	Venue	Status
Devon & Cornwall	35	6	14 September 1935	Rectory Ground, Devonport	Tour match
Midland Counties	9	3	19 September 1935	Highfield Road, Coventry	Tour match
Yorkshire & Cumberland	14	3	21 September 1935	Lidget Green, Bradford	Tour match
Abertillery & Cross Keys	31	6	25 September 1935	Abertillery Park, Abertillery	Tour match
Swansea	3	11	28 September 1935	St. Helen's, Swansea	Tour match
Gloucestershire & Somerset	23	3	3 October 1935	Memorial Stadium, Bristol	Tour match
Lancashire & Cheshire	21	8	5 October 1935	Birkenhead	Tour match
Northumberland & Durham	10	6	9 October 1935	Gosforth	Tour match
South of Scotland	11	8	12 October 1935	Mansfield Park, Hawick	Tour match
Glasgow - Edinburgh	9	8	16 October 1935	Old Anniesland, Glasgow	Tour match
Combined Services	6	5	19 October 1935	Aldershot	Tour match
Llanelli RFC	16	8	22 October 1935	Stradey Park, Llanelli	Tour match
Cardiff	20	5	26 October 1935	Arms Park, Cardiff	Tour match
Newport	17	5	31 October 1935	Rodney Parade, Newport	Tour match
London Counties	11	0	2 November 1935	Twickenham, London	Tour match
Oxford University	10	9	7 November 1935	Iffley Road, Oxford	Tour match
Hampshire & Sussex	14	8	9 November 1935	Dean Court, Bournemouth	Tour match
Cambridge University	25	5	14 November 1935	Grange Road, Cambridge	Tour match
Leicestershire & East Midlands	16	3	16 November 1935	Welford Road, Leicester	Tour match
Scotland	18	8	23 November 1935	Murrayfield, Edinburgh	Test match
North of Scotland	12	6	27 November 1935	Linksfield Stadium, Aberdeen	Tour match
Ulster	3	3	30 November 1935	Ravenhill, Belfast	Tour match
Ireland	17	9	7 December 1935	Lansdowne Road, Dublin	Test match
Mid-Districts	31	10	12 December 1935	Ynys, Aberdare	Tour match
Neath & Abevaron	13	3	14 December 1935	Aberavon	Tour match
Wales	12	13	21 December 1935	Arms Park, Cardiff	Test match
London Counties	24	5	26 December 1935	Twickenham, London	Tour match
England	0	13	4 January 1936	Twickenham, London	Test match
Vancouver	32	0	25 January 1936	Brockton Point, Vancouver	Tour match
Victoria (B.C.)	27	3	29 January 1936	MacDonald Park, Victoria	Tour match

== Touring party ==
- Manager: Vincent Meredith
- Assistant manager:
- Captain: Jack Manchester

=== Full-back ===
- Mike Gilbert (West Coast)

=== Three-quarters ===
- Nelson Ball (Wellington)
- Henry Brown (Auckland)
- George Hart (Canterbury)
- Neville Mitchell (Southland)
- Charlie Oliver (Canterbury)

=== Five-eighths ===
- Jack Griffiths (Wellington)
- Harcourt Caughey (Auckland)
- Rusty Page (Wellington)
- Dave Solomon (Auckland)
- Eric Tindill (Wellington)

=== Halfbacks ===
- Merv Corner (Auckland)
- Joey Sadler (Wellington)

=== Forwards ===
- George Adkins (South Canterbury)
- Jack Best (Marlborough)
- Bill Collins (Hawke's Bay)
- Douglas Dalton (Hawke's Bay)
- William Edward Hadley (Auckland)
- John Hore (Otago)
- Ronald King (West Coast)
- Arthur Lambourn (Wellington)
- Atholstan Mahoney (Bush Districts)
- Jack Manchester (Cantebury)
- Rod MacKenzie (Manawatu)
- Hubert McLean (Auckland)
- Cyril Pepper (Auckland)
- Tori Reid (Hawke's Bay)
- Frederick Vorrath (Otago)
- James Wynyard (Waikato)

== The matches ==
=== Scotland ===
23 November 1935

Scotland	8–18	New Zealand
Try: Fyfe; Dick; Con: Murdoch		Try: Caughey (3); Hadley; Con: Gilbert (3)

Murrayfield
Referee: CH Gadney (England)

=== Ireland ===
7 December 1935

Ireland	9–17	New Zealand
Try: Beamish; Pen: Bailey; Siggins		Try: Mitchell; Oliver; Hart; Con: Gilbert; Pen Gilbert (2)

Referee: RW Jeffares (Republic of Ireland) (Ireland)

=== Wales ===
21 December 1935

Wales	13–12	New Zealand
Try: Rees-Jones (2); Davey; Con: Jenkins (2)		Try: Ball (2); Con: Gilbert; Drop: Gilbert

Cardiff Arms Park
Attendance: 50,000
Referee: Cyril Gadney (England)

Wales: Vivian Jenkins (London Welsh), Geoffrey Rees-Jones (Oxford Univ.), Idwal Rees (Swansea), Claude Davey (Swansea) (capt.), Wilf Wooller (Cambridge Univ.), Cliff Jones (Cambridge Univ.), Haydn Tanner (Swansea), Tom Rees (Newport), Don Tarr, (Swansea), Harry Payne (Swansea), Trevor Williams (Cross Keys), Eddie Watkins (Cardiff), Glyn Prosser (Neath), Jim Lang (Llanelli), Arthur Rees (London Welsh)

New Zealand: G Gilbert, GF Hart, NA Mitchell, N Ball, CJ Oliver, JL Griffiths, BS Sadler, A Lambourn, WE Hadley, D Dalton, ST Reid, RR King, JE Manchester (capt.), A Mahoney, HF McLean

=== England ===
4 January 1936

England	13–0	New Zealand
Try: Obolensky (2); Sever; Drop: Cranmer

Twickenham
Referee: JW Faull (Wales)
