= Tom Rees (rugby union, born 1913) =

Wales international rugby union footballer

- Born: Thomas James Rees; 8 May 1913 Fleur-de-Lys, Caerphilly Wales
- Died: 19 February 1991 (aged 77) Fleur-de-Lys, Caerphilly, Wales
- School: Fleur de Lys Council School
- Occupation(s): miner police officer

Rugby union career
- Position: Prop
Amateur team(s)
Years	Team	Apps	(Points)
- Ebbw Vale RFC
1934-1939	Newport RFC		
–	Abertillery RFC		
–	Cross Keys RFC		
–	Pontypool RFC		
International career
Years	Team	Apps	(Points)
1935-1937	Wales	8	(0)

Thomas Rees (8 May 1913 – 19 February 1991) was a Welsh international rugby union prop who played club rugby for Newport RFC. He was a member of the winning Welsh team who beat the 1935 touring All Blacks.

== Rugby career ==
Rees joined Newport in 1934 after joining Newport Police Force. In 1935 he was part of the Newport team that faced the touring New Zealand team. Newport lost the game 17-5 in a game noted for its physicality in the scrum and during rucks. Rees was also chosen to represent Wales against the same touring New Zealand team, but earlier in the year had already gained his first Welsh cap when he was selected to face both Scotland and Ireland in the Home Nations Championship.

Rees' first international match was against Scotland under the captaincy of Claude Davey. Wales won the game 10-6, mainly thanks to an impressive display from Cliff Jones. His second international, at Ravenhill in Belfast, saw Wales lose to Ireland, the eventual tournament winners. His next international game was against the New Zealand tourists in a close game which Wales won in the last few minutes. In 1936 Rees played in all three games of the Home Nations Championship which Wales won after beating Scotland and Ireland and drawing with England. Rees played in the first two games of the 1937 Championship, with his final game being against Scotland at St Helens.

In 1938 Rees was approached to play for the British Lions in their 1938 tour of South Africa, but turned them down for financial reasons.

=== International games played ===
Wales

- England 1936, 1937
- Ireland 1935, 1936, 1937
- New Zealand 1935
- Scotland 1935, 1936

== Bibliography ==
- Billot, John (1972). All Blacks in Wales. Ferndale: Ron Jones Publications.
- Godwin, Terry (1984). The International Rugby Championship 1883-1983. London: Willows Books. ISBN 0-00-218060-X.
- Smith, David; Williams, Gareth (1980). Fields of Praise: The Official History of The Welsh Rugby Union. Cardiff: University of Wales Press. ISBN 0-7083-0766-3.
