= Jack Best =

Jack Best may refer to:

- John William Best (1912–2000), British Royal Air Force pilot
- Jack Best (rugby union) (1914–1994), New Zealand rugby union player
