= Jim Wynyard =

NZ international rugby union player

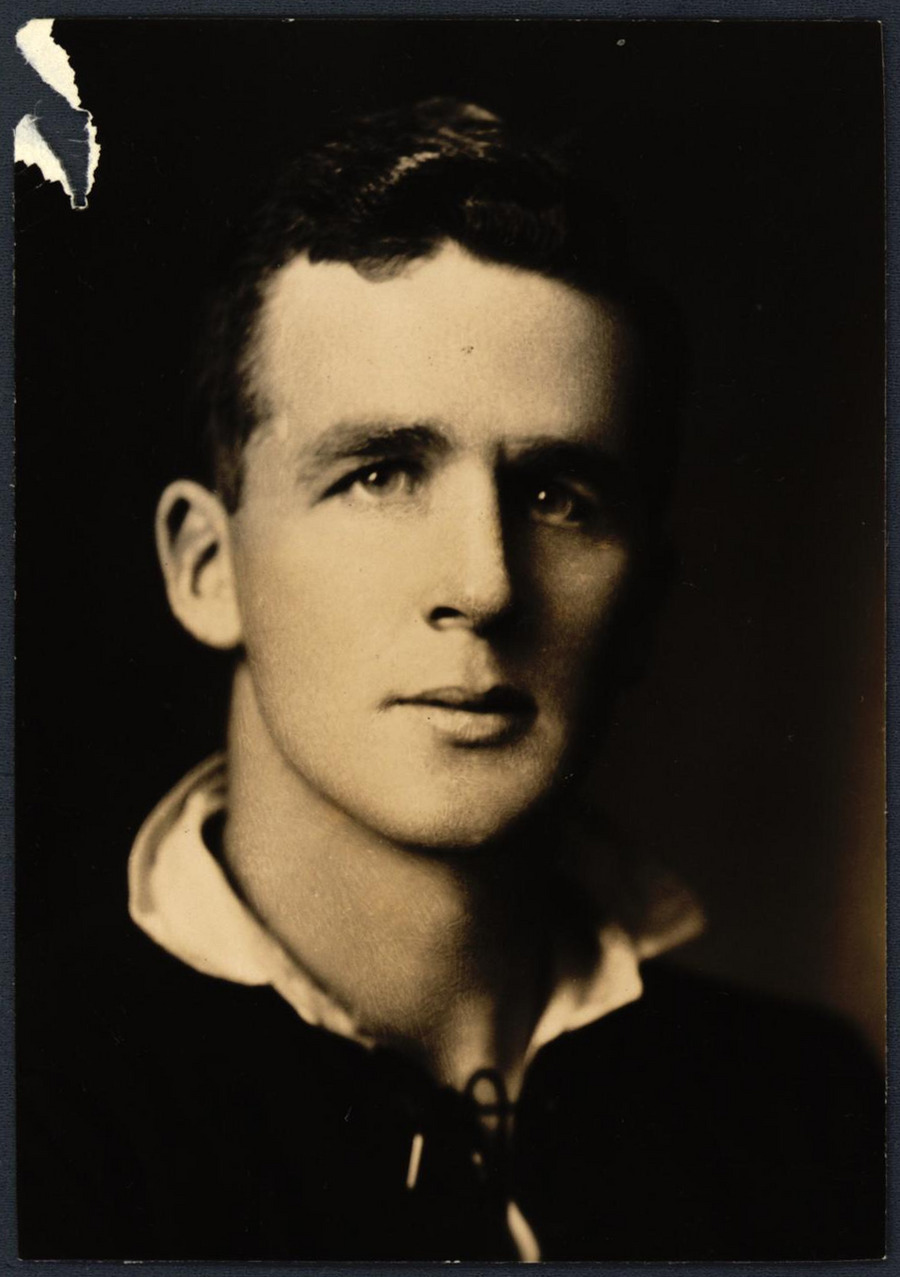
- Wynyard in 1935
- Born: James Gladwin Wynyard; 17 August 1914 Kihikihi, New Zealand
- Died: 2 November 1942 (aged 28) El Alamein, Egypt
- Height: 1.91 m (6 ft 3 in)
- Weight: 92 kg (203 lb)
- School: New Plymouth Boys' High School

Rugby union career
- Position: Loose forward
International career
Years	Team	Apps	(Points)
1935-38	New Zealand	0	(0)

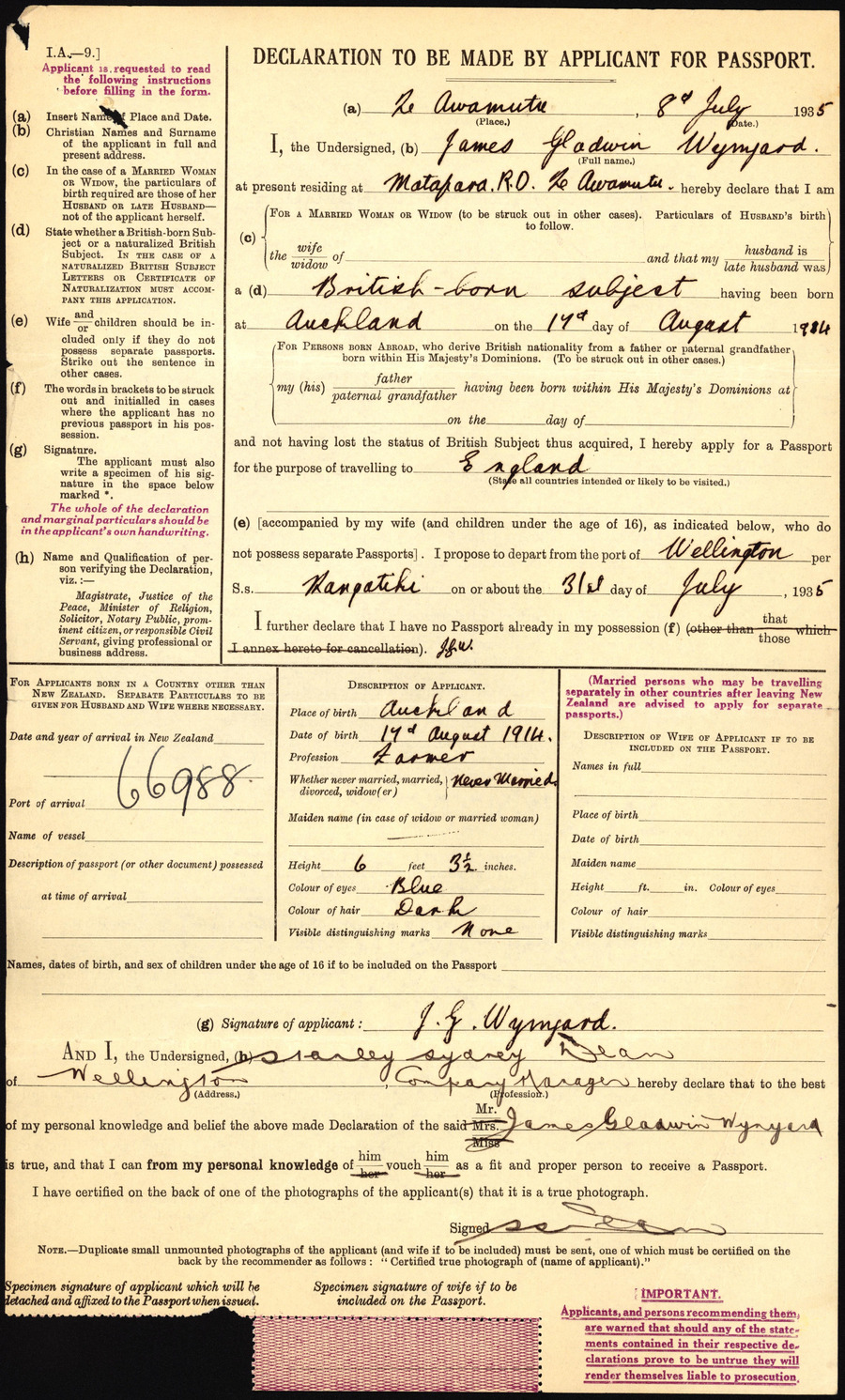
James Gladwin Wynyard passport application (1935)

James Gladwin Wynyard (17 August 1914 – 2 November 1942) was a New Zealand rugby union player. As a loose forward, he represented the All Blacks from 1935 to 1938, never playing a full test. He was part of the squad for the 1935–36 New Zealand rugby union tour of Britain, Ireland and Canada. His career was cut short by World War Two. He served as a captain in the Divisional Cavalry, and was killed in action at the Battle of El Alamein in 1942.
