= Vincent Meredith (lawyer) =

Sir Vincent Meredith QC
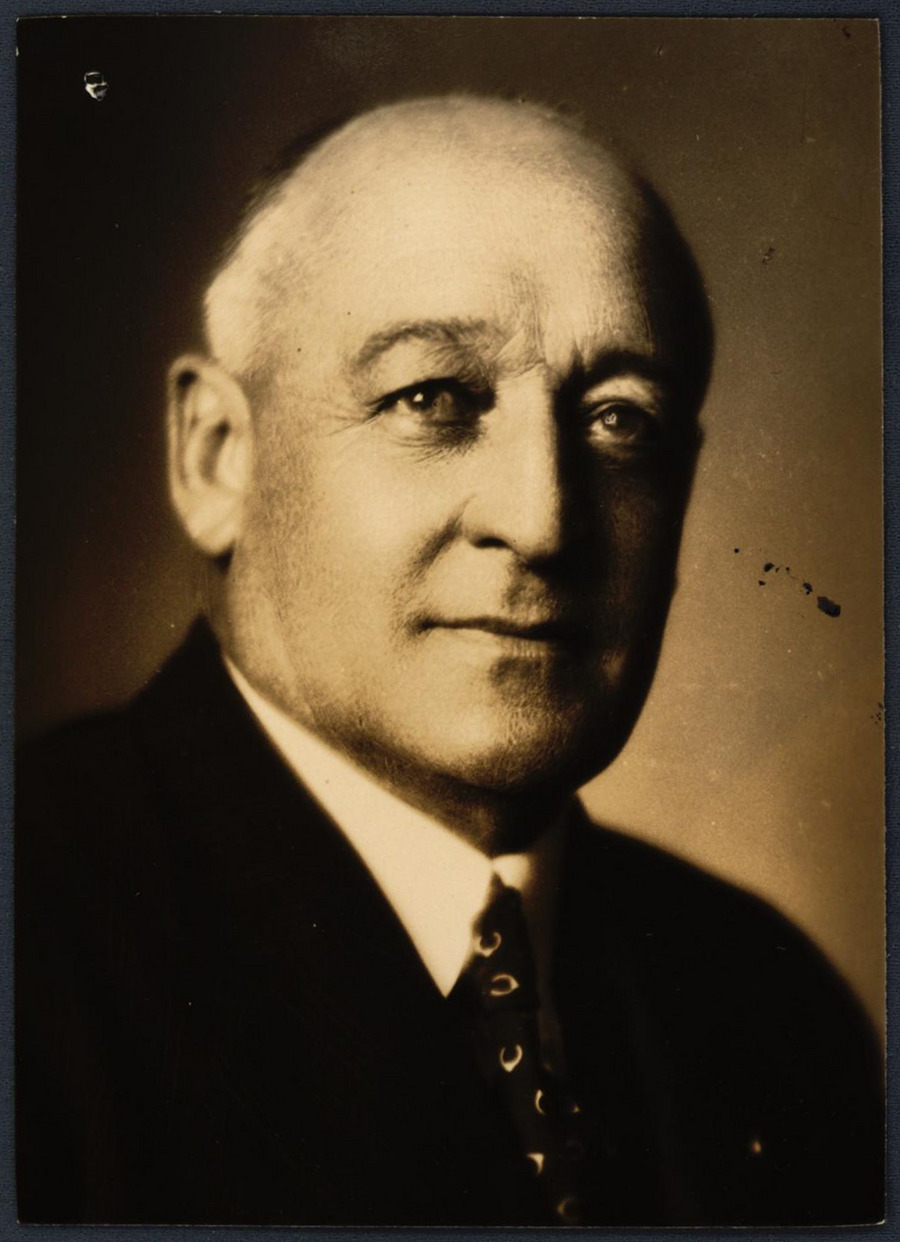
- Meredith in 1935
- Born: Vincent Robert Sissons Meredith; 31 March 1877; Whangārei, New Zealand
- Died: 15 January 1965 (aged 87); Auckland, New Zealand
- Occupation(s): Barrister and solicitor
- Known for: Crown prosecutor and manager of 1935–36 All Blacks
- Spouse: Hilda May Staples (m. 1905; died 1958)
- Children: 3

Sir Vincent Robert Sissons Meredith QC (31 March 1877 – 15 January 1965) was a New Zealand lawyer. A rugby union player, he became a rugby official and managed the 1935–36 tour of Britain, Ireland and Canada.

== Early life and family ==
Born in Whangārei on 31 March 1877, Meredith was the son of Emily Elizabeth Meredith (née Sissons) and Henry North Meredith. He was educated at Onehunga Primary School and at Auckland Grammar School, for which he had won a scholarship.

In 1905, he married Hilda May Staples, and the couple went on to have three children.

== Professional life ==
In 1895, Meredith was a cadet with the Customs Department in Wellington, became a landing waiter in Auckland in 1902 and then worked in that job in Dunedin in 1906 and back in Wellington from 1907. He retired from the Customs Department in 1908 to commence in legal practice in the capital city instead. He went to Auckland and became a partner in the firm Meredith, Hubble & Meredith. In 1921, he became Crown solicitor in Auckland. He represented the government in the 1927 Royal Commission that investigated grievances against the administration in Samoa.

== Rugby union ==
Meredith played rugby union when he came to Wellington, represented the region and captained the team. He stopped playing when he moved to Auckland in 1902. When he came to Dunedin in 1906, he coached the local team – the Pirates. Later in Auckland, he was a selector for the rugby union. Meredith was the manager of the New Zealand national rugby union team on their 1935–36 tour of Britain, Ireland and Canada.

== Awards ==
Meredith was appointed a Knight Bachelor in the 1952 New Year Honours. On 11 September 1957, he was appointed Queen's Counsel alongside Richard Wild.

== Death ==
Meredith died in Auckland on 15 January 1965 aged 87. His wife had died in 1958. Both were cremated at Purewa Cemetery and Crematorium.
