= Jim Lang (rugby union) =

Wales international rugby union footballer

- Born: James Lang; 1 October 1909 Garnant, Wales
- Died: 22 December 1991 (aged 82) Morriston, Wales

Rugby union career
- Position: Number 8
Amateur team(s)
| Years | Team | Apps | (Points) |
| ?-1936 | Llanelli RFC | | |
| 1936-? | Swansea RFC | | |
International career
| Years | Team | Apps | (Points) |
| 1931–1937 | Wales | 12 | (3) |

Jim Lang (1 October 1909 – 22 December 1991) was a Welsh international rugby union number 8 who played club rugby for Llanelli and Swansea. Whilst with Llanelli he faced two touring Southern Hemisphere teams, the South Africans in 1931 and New Zealand in 1935.

== Rugby career ==
Lang was first capped for Wales in the 1931 Five Nations Championship in a game against France. Under the captaincy of Jack Bassett, Wales won the game with ease, running in seven tries. Lang was reselected two weeks later to face the Irish at Ravenhill, and when Wales won the game they also won the tournament. Lang would remain unselected for his country for another four years, but in 1931 he played for Llanelli when they hosted the touring South Africans. Lang ran out against the Springboks with his brother, Will, but ended the game on the losing side.

In 1934 Lang was back in the Welsh team, adding some experience to a team which the game earlier with 13 new caps, had lost at home to England. Led by Claude Davey and with the flair supplied by Cliff Jones, Wales beat Scotland at Murrayfield. This game was the first of ten sequential games that Lang would play for Wales stretching to 1937. His most memorable game during this period was Wales's win against the touring New Zealand team in 1935. Having already faced, and lost, to the All Blacks with Llanelli, Lang found himself selected to face the tourists for his country. It was a memorable win for Wales in a match filled with drama, that saw Wales losing with ten minutes remaining and their hooker stretchered off with a broken neck, only for the Welsh team to rally for a narrow win. Lang played his part with strong line-out play that allowed Wales to gain from good possession.

=== International matches played ===
Wales

- England 1935, 1936, 1937
- France 1931
- Ireland 1931, 1934, 1935, 1936
- New Zealand 1935
- Scotland 1934, 1935, 1936

== Bibliography ==
- Billot, John (1972). All Blacks in Wales. Ferndale: Ron Jones Publications.
- Godwin, Terry (1984). The International Rugby Championship 1883-1983. London: Willows Books. ISBN 0-00-218060-X.
- Smith, David; Williams, Gareth (1980). Fields of Praise: The Official History of The Welsh Rugby Union. Cardiff: University of Wales Press. ISBN 0-7083-0766-3.
