= Arthur Lambourn =

New Zealand rugby union player

Artie Lambourn
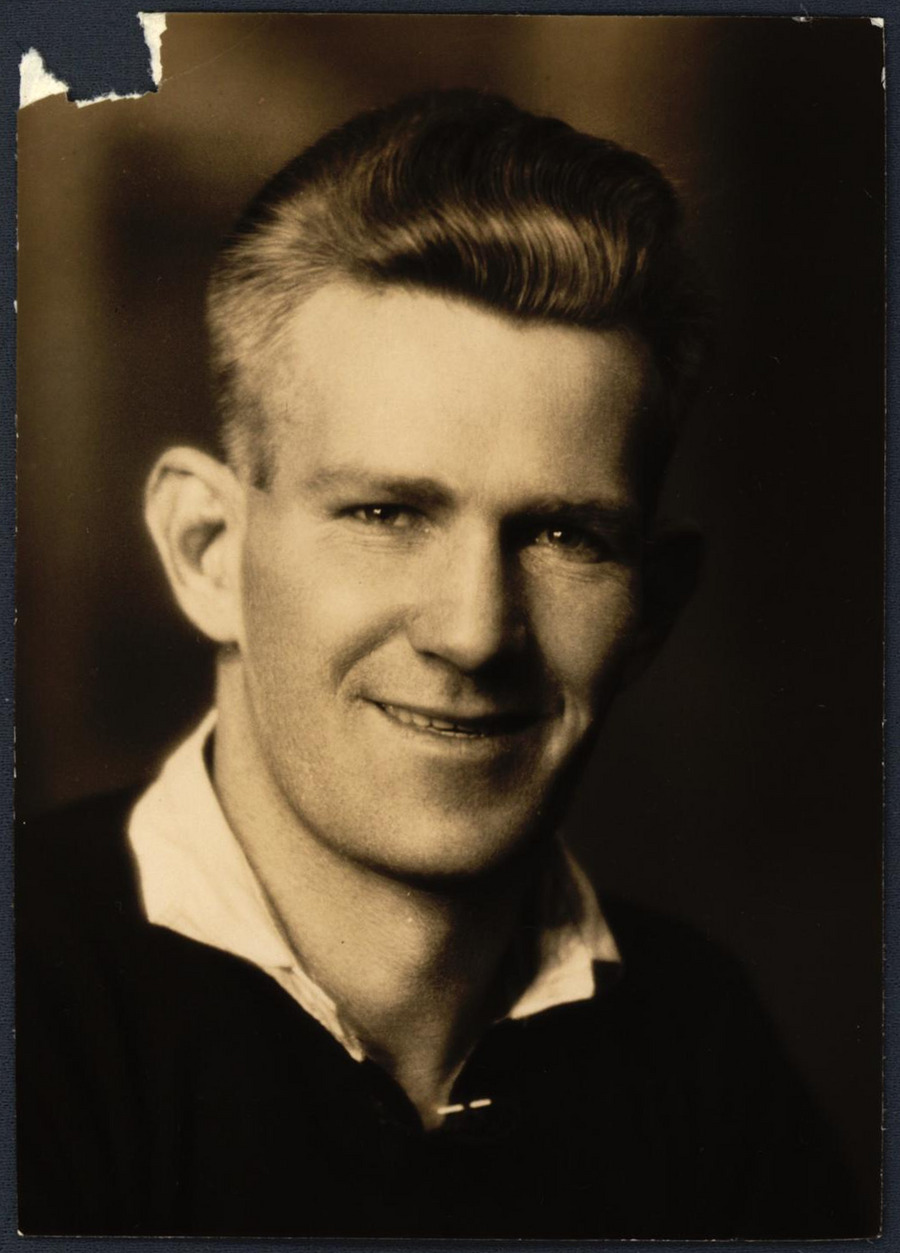
- Lambourn in 1935
- Born: Arthur Lambourn; 11 January 1910 Maryborough, Queensland, Australia
- Died: 24 September 1999 (aged 89) Lower Hutt, New Zealand
- Height: 1.78 m (5 ft 10 in)
- Weight: 83 kg (183 lb)
- School: Petone District High School
- Occupation: Photoengraver

Rugby union career
- Position(s): Hooker, prop
Provincial / State sides
Years	Team	Apps	(Points)
1932–39	Wellington		
International career
Years	Team	Apps	(Points)
1934–38	New Zealand	10	(0)

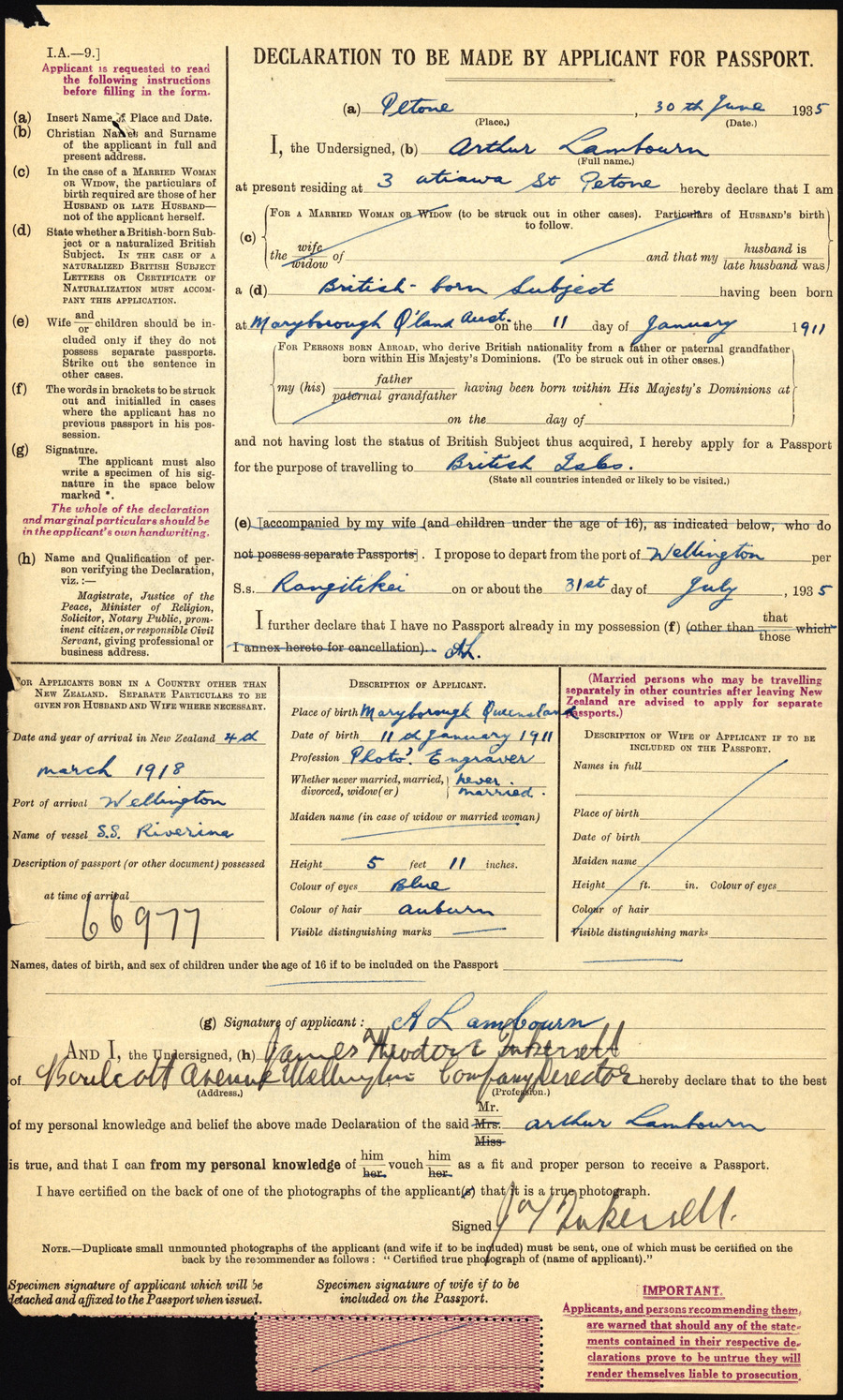
Arthur Lambourn passport application (1935)

Arthur Lambourn (11 January 1910 – 24 September 1999) was a New Zealand rugby union player. A front rower, Lambourn represented Wellington at a provincial level, and was a member of the New Zealand national side, the All Blacks, from 1932 to 1938. He played 40 matches for the All Blacks including 10 internationals.

At the time of his death in 1999, Lambourn was the third oldest living All Black. His brother was Lt-Col Albert Lambourn who was awarded the DSO for his field artillery batteries engagement in the New Zealand break-out of Minqar Qaim.
