= Helen Gibb =

New Zealand farmer, accommodation-house keeper, and postmistress

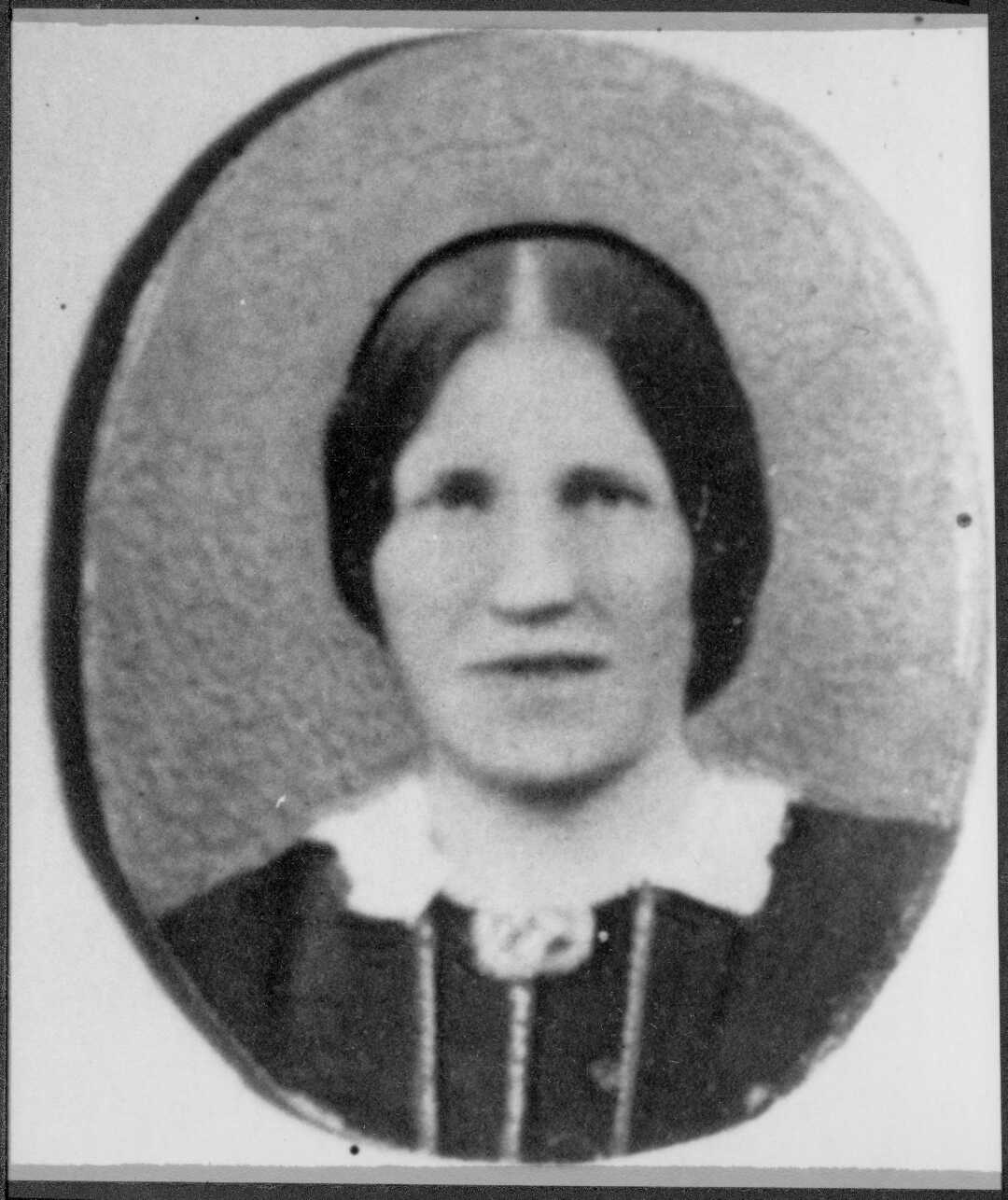
- Helen Gibb, about 1867
- Born: 9 July 1838; Cortachy and Clova, Forfarshire, Scotland
- Died: 30 July 1914 (aged 76)
- Occupation(s): Farmer, accommodation-house keeper, postmistress

Helen Gibb (9 July 1838 – 30 July 1914) was a New Zealand farmer, accommodation-house keeper and postmistress.
