= Ray Speed =

New Zealand footballer

Personal information
- Full name: Raymond Arthur Speed
- Date of birth: 4 July 1914
- Place of birth: New Zealand
- Date of death: 8 July 1997 (aged 83)

Senior career*
Years	Team	Apps	(Gls)
- Metro College
- Mount Albert Grammar

International career
1936–1947	New Zealand	6	(0)
- * Club domestic league appearances and goals

Raymond Arthur Speed (4 July 1914 – 8 July 1997) was a football (soccer) player who represented New Zealand at international level.

Speed made his full All Whites debut in a 1–7 loss to Australia on 4 July 1936 and ended his international playing career with six A-international caps to his credit, his final cap an appearance in a 1–4 loss to South Africa on 19 July 1947.
