= Jack Rankin (rugby union) =

New Zealand rugby player (1914–1989)

- Born: John George Rankin; 14 February 1914 Christchurch, New Zealand
- Died: 8 December 1989 (aged 75) Christchurch, New Zealand
- Height: 1.80 m (5 ft 11 in)
- Weight: 81 kg (179 lb)
- School: Christchurch Boys' High School

Rugby union career
- Position: Flanker
Provincial / State sides
Years	Team	Apps	(Points)
1933–1941	Canterbury	41	
1941	Wellington	3	
International career
Years	Team	Apps	(Points)
1936–1937	New Zealand	3	(6)

John George Rankin (14 February 1914 – 8 December 1989) was a New Zealand rugby union player. A flanker, Rankin represented Canterbury and, briefly, Wellington at a provincial level. He was a member of the New Zealand national side, the All Blacks, in 1936 and 1937. He played four matches for the All Blacks including three internationals.

During World War II, Rankin served as an officer with the New Zealand forces, being commissioned as a second lieutenant in September 1941. He was a Canterbury selector–coach from 1948 to 1954, and a South Island selector between 1955 and 1957.
