= James Gow Black =

New Zealand chemist (1835–1914)

Professor James Gow Black
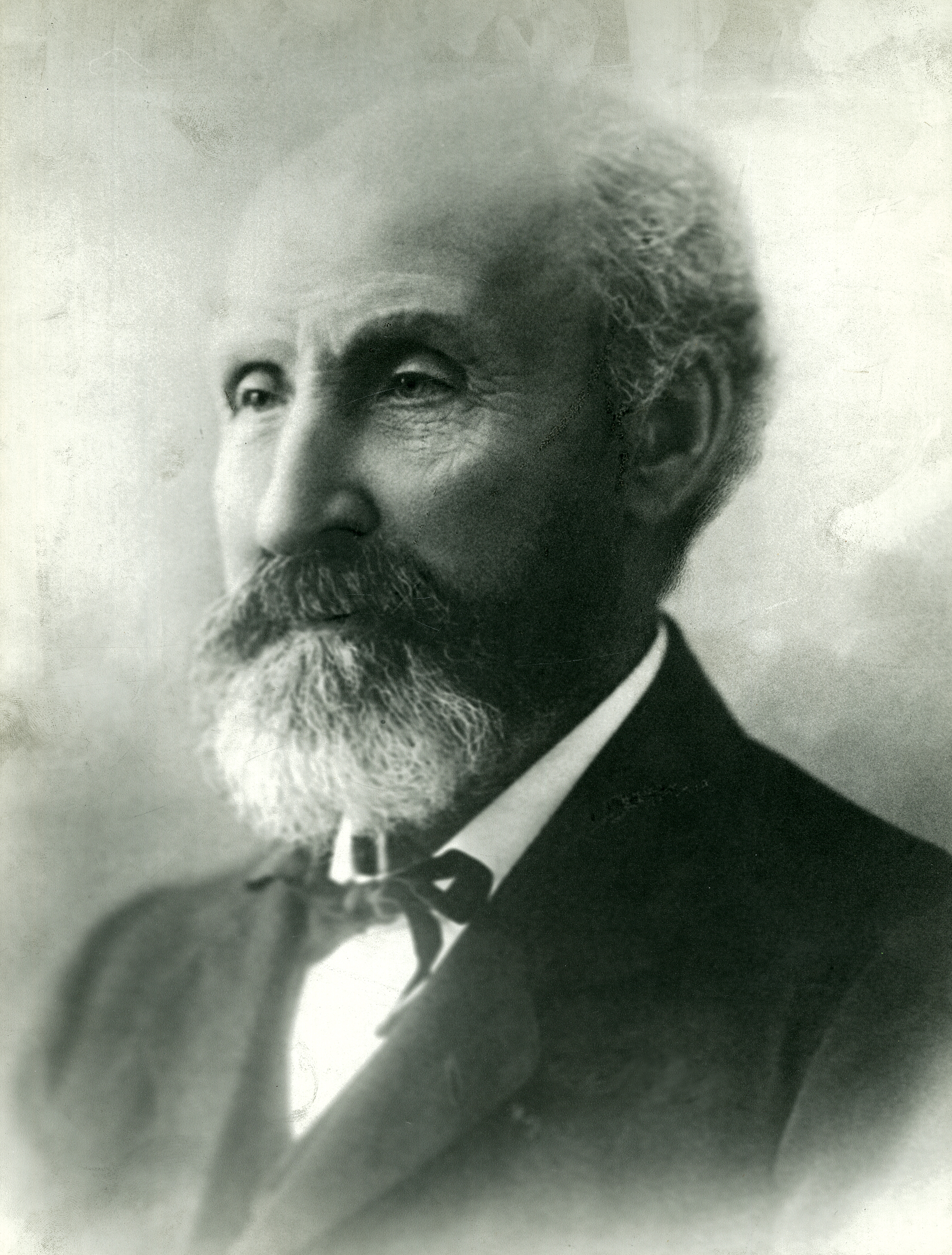
- Pr0fessor Black c. 1900
- Born: 10 May 1835
- Died: 25 December 1914 (aged 79); Halfmoon Bay, Stewart Island, NZ
- Resting place: Halfmoon Bay
- Education: University of Edinburgh
- Spouse: Jeannie Crichton
- Children: David Hugh Tibbett; Jessie Elizabeth; Margaret; Janie Alice
- Scientific career
- Workplaces: University of Otago, New Zealand

James Gow Black (10 May 1835 – 25 December 1914) was a New Zealand chemist, mineralogist, lecturer and university professor . He was born in Tomgarrow, Perthshire, Scotland on 10 May 1835, the eldest of seven children of David, quarrier and farmer, and Margaret (née Gow).

Fenby noted that “Black supported himself by manual labour, and from the age of 14 by teaching. The nearest parish school was six miles from his home, so he set up his own school to teach neighbouring children”. After teaching at Liff Free Church School he attended Moray House Training College and then the University of Edinburgh, from where Black graduated MA in 1864, BSc in 1867 and DSc in 1869.

In 1871 there were 23 applicants for the chair of natural science at the newly established University of Otago, New Zealand. The position was awarded to Black by unanimous vote. The family sailed on the Christian McCausland from Glasgow to Port Chalmers, the main port of Dunedin, arriving after a 90 day voyage on 28 December 1871.

In his introductory lecture at the University Black claimed that one of the aims of a scientific education was to enable a person ”to produce a pound of corn, or wool, or iron, or gold, at half the expenditure which it previously cost”. It was this profoundly practical approach to science that was his guiding philosophy. The two books he published were for use in the field; he was not a researcher.

A colleague added:

James Gow Black was first and foremost a teacher and populariser of science. His style was lucid, forceful and tinged with humour; his lecture demonstrations fascinating, sometimes to the point of appearing magical; his enthusiasm contagious. He addressed numerous audiences: students, teachers – many of whom travelled considerable distances to attend his Saturday morning classes, miners and the general public.

— David Vernon Fenby

== Books ==
- Black, James G (1885). Chemistry for the gold fields. Dunedin, New Zealand: J. Horsburgh.
- Black, James G (1895). Lectures on agricultural chemistry. Wellington, NZ: Samuel Costall, Govt. Printer.

== Family ==
James Gow Black married Jeannie Crichton on 25 August 1869 in Edinburgh. They had four children:

- David Hugh Tibbett
- Jessie Elizabeth
- Margaret
- Janie Alice

The first child was born in Scotland, and the rest in New Zealand.

James died on Christmas Day 1914 in Halfmoon Bay. He is buried there, with his daughter Margaret and her husband. Jeannie died in Otago, aged 82, on 30 April 1919.
