= Hal Sever =

England international rugby union player

Hal Sever (c. 1910 – June 2005 (aged 94–95)) was an English rugby international playing ten matches. He was educated at Shrewsbury School, which is normally regarded as a footballing school. He made his debut in 1936 as a member of the first English team to defeat the All Blacks and played an integral role in the English team in 1937 that won the Triple Crown. He played his last international game against Scotland in 1938. He played club rugby for Sale and represented Cheshire as well as playing 8 matches for the Barbarians.

== Career ==
Sever was part of an international three-quarter line for Sale playing with Claude Davey and Wilf Wooller of Wales and Ken Fyfe of Scotland.

He made his international debut against the All Blacks in the famous "Obolensky" match when Prince Obolensky scored two tries. Sever scored the other try in a 13–0 win which was England's first against New Zealand.

Sever's most memorable performance was in the Triple Crown series in 1937. He scored vital points in each match starting with a drop goal against Wales in a 4–3 victory at Twickenham. Sever scored a matchwinning try in the next match against Ireland on 13 February 1937 in which he beat several defenders in scoring wide out. The final score was 9–8. In the final match of the series at Murrayfield, Sever scored the second try in a 6–3 victory over Scotland.

His final international match was against Scotland in 1938 at Twickenham which was the first rugby match to be televised on the BBC. According to the Guinness Book of Sporting Blunders, Sever "dramatically ran into the opposition goalpost, losing not only the ball but his teeth as well". Sever disputed this version of events in the Daily Telegraph in its edition of 26 February 1999 saying "The suggestion that I collided with the posts is absolute nonsense ... I very nearly reached the tryline, was upheld by the opposing pack and was unable to ground the ball." Scotland won the match 21–16.
