= Donald Cobden =

New Zealand rugby union player

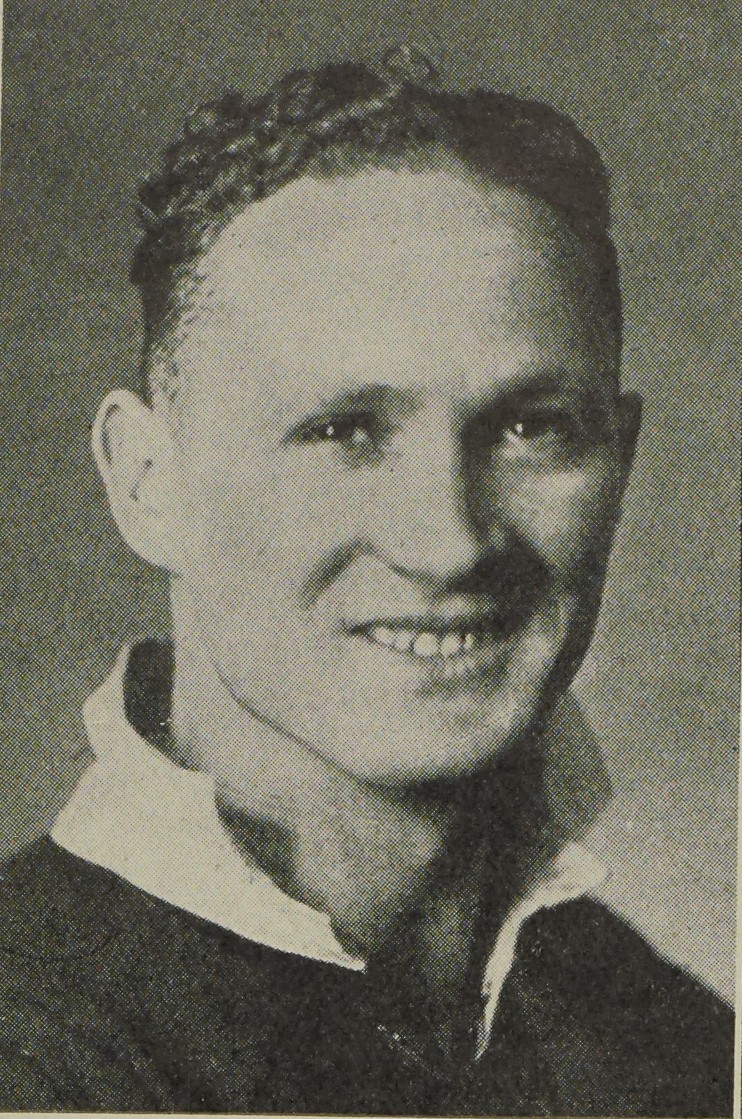
- Cobden in 1937
- Born: Donald Gordon Cobden; 11 August 1914 Christchurch
- Died: 11 August 1940 (aged 26) English Channel
- Height: 1.85 m (6 ft 1 in)
- Weight: 84 kg (185 lb)

Rugby union career
- Position: Wing
International career
Years	Team	Apps	(Points)
1937	New Zealand	1	(0)

Donald Gordon Cobden (11 August 1914 – 11 August 1940) was a New Zealand All Black rugby player, No 430 in 1937. He was a wing.

He played for Canterbury, and was selected for the first test against the Springboks in August 1937. His test (and All Black) career only lasted 25 minutes, as he was severely injured in a bad tackle. As he was walking and greeted the team at the end of the game, a national selector said he should have returned to the field, and proposed to veto his further selection.

Cobden went to England in 1937, and in 1938 joined the Royal Air Force on a short service commission. In England he played for Catford Bridge, Kent, the RAF and the Barbarians.

He was posted to No. 74 Squadron RAF, which was flying Spitfires from RAF Hornchurch in Essex during the Battle of France and then the Battle of Britain. On 11 August 1940, he was despatched with members of 76 Squadron to protect a convoy, and they engaged a large group of Messerschmitt BF 110s about 10 miles off the coast of Harwich. He was last seen attacking a number of enemy aircraft, and failed to return. He was posted missing – on his 26th birthday. He is buried at Oostende new communal cemetery.

He was born in Christchurch and educated at Christchurch Boys' High School. His brother Alfred, a professional cricketer, was killed in North Africa in 1942 while with the New Zealand Army.
