= Joey Sadler =

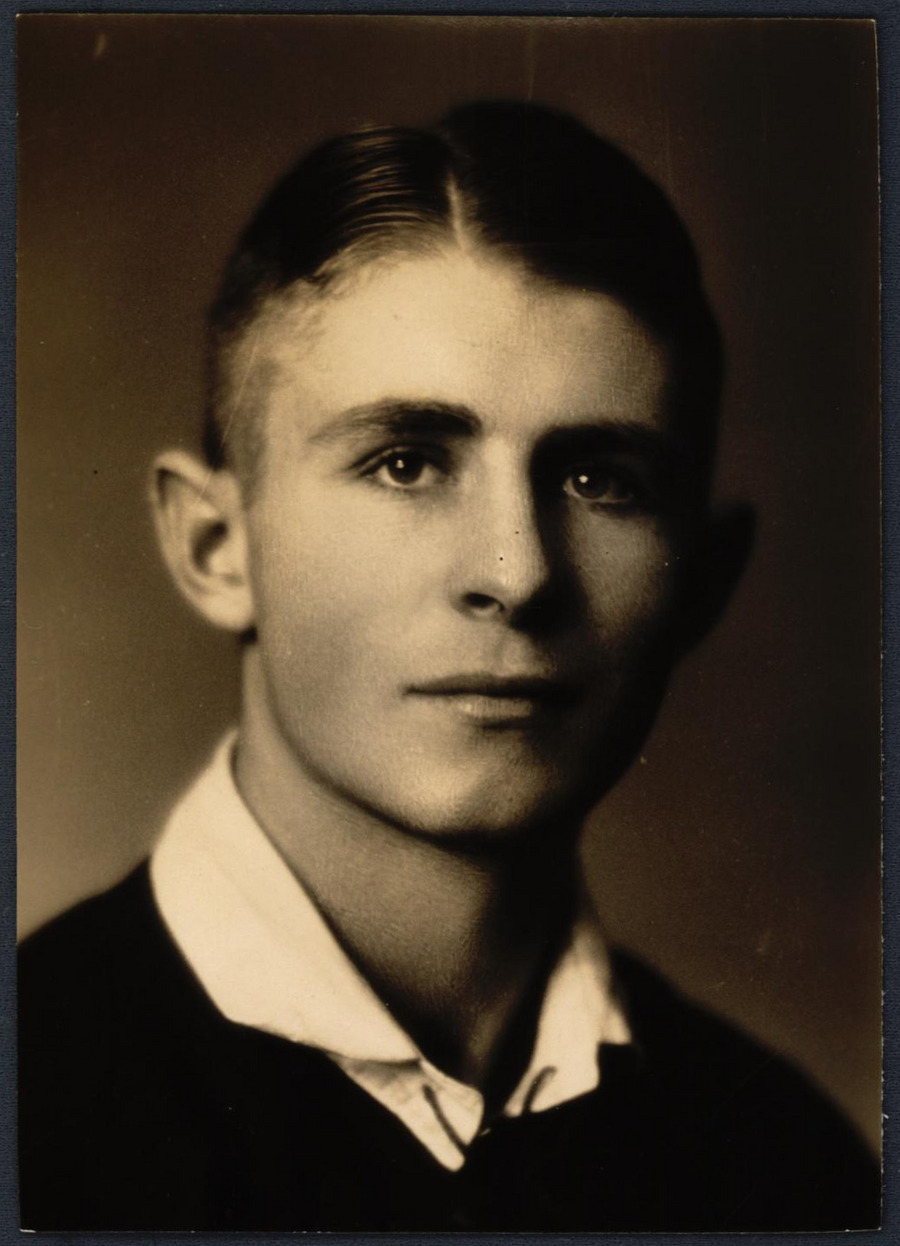
- Born: Bernard Sydney Sadler; 28 July 1914 Wellington, New Zealand
- Died: 24 June 2007 (aged 92) Wellington, New Zealand
- Height: 1.65 m (5 ft 5 in)
- Weight: 62 kg (137 lb)
- School: Wellington College

Rugby union career
- Position: Halfback
Provincial / State sides
Years	Team	Apps	(Points)
1934–37	Wellington		
International career
Years	Team	Apps	(Points)
1935–36	New Zealand	5	(0)

Bernard Sydney "Joey" Sadler (28 July 1914 – 24 June 2007) was a New Zealand rugby union player who played at halfback for the All Blacks in 1935–36.

== Career ==
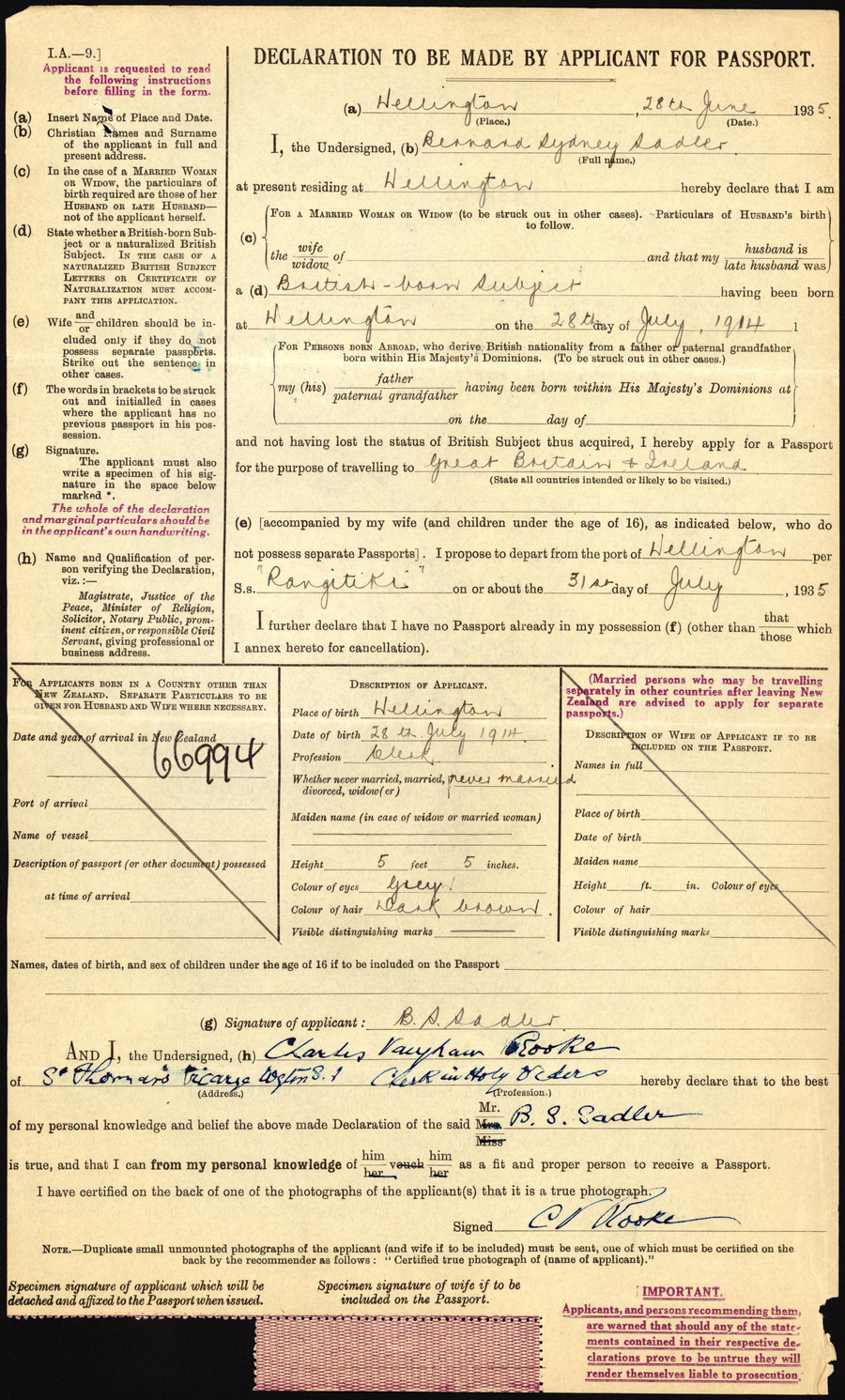
Bernard Sydney Sadler passport application (1935)

Sadler was born in Wellington, New Zealand in 1914. He first attracted attention playing in the Wellington College 1st XV between 1930 and 1932. Sadler played club rugby for Wellington College Old Boys and made the Wellington representative side in 1934.

He was selected by the editors of the 1935 Rugby Almanac of New Zealand as one of their 5 promising players after the 1934 season.

He was picked for the All Blacks' 1935–36 squad, playing 15 games including three internationals on tour in the British Isles and Canada. He played in both tests in the Bledisloe Cup against the touring Australian side in 1936.

Unfortunately, he damaged a nerve in his knee in a club game early in the 1937 season to such an extent that he never played rugby again. Sadler was a small player known by the British press as "the pocket battleship" for his strength. He was also a skilled ball player with good leg speed.

Sadler married Noeleen Welborne Nelson at St Mark's Church, Wellington, on 5 February 1941. They lived for much of their lives in Paraparaumu Beach.
