= Walter Whittlestone =

Agricultural chemist, dairy researcher, community worker, peace activist (1914–1985)

Walter George Whittlestone (1914–1985) was a notable New Zealand agricultural chemist, dairy researcher, community worker and peace activist. He was born in Abbotsford, Dunedin, New Zealand in 1914.
