= Irving Sayles =

American vaudeville performer (1872–1914)

Irving Sayles

Irving Sayles (1872 – 8 February 1914) was an African-American vaudeville entertainer. He spent much of his life in Australia as a popular minstrel show performer, touring the Tivoli circuit. He performed coon songs and employed a self-deprecating humor involving comic interpretations of plantation slavery that reinforced negative racial stereotypes.

== Early years and work in Australia ==
Irving Sayles was born in Quincy, Illinois, to Melinda (née Wilson) and Josephus Sayles. He reported his year of birth as 1872. He became a member of Haverly's United Mastodon Minstrels at a young age. In 1888 he traveled to Australia as part of the Hicks-Sawyer Minstrels, the second company that minstrelsy manager Charles Hicks brought to Australia. That September, the group played the Opera House in Sydney, where Sayles performed a solo piece and played the tambourine. Following a leg in Tasmania, Hicks wrote in 1890 that Sayles was the hit of their trip, saying that "[h]is song, 'Father of a Little Black Coon,' gets three and four encores nightly." After the minstrel group broke up in 1890, Sayles went to Melbourne, where he worked for Frank Clark. He met Charlie Pope and the two formed a double act, with Pope playing the straight man. They worked for theatre owner Harry Rickards.

== Later life ==
Sayles entered Australia prior to the White Australia policy and the Immigration Restriction Act 1901. He participated in amateur races and in 1897 he married Englishwoman Edith Carter in Melbourne. From 1909 until his death he partnered with Les Warton. He made a long run as the cornerman "Tambo" and appeared on the cover of Theatre magazine in 1911.

== Death ==
Sayles died suddenly from a blood clot on 8 February 1914 in Christchurch, New Zealand, after performing on the Brennan-Fuller vaudeville circuit as part of Fuller's Vaudeville Company. He was 42. He was buried in Linwood.
