= Matutaera Nihoniho =

Ngāti Porou leader, soldier, storekeeper, and assessor

Matutaera Nihoniho (1850–1914) was a New Zealand Ngāti Porou leader, soldier, storekeeper and assessor.
