= Cliff Jones (rugby union) =

Wales international rugby union footballer (1914-1990)

Cliff Jones OBE
- Born: Clifford William Jones; 12 March 1914 Porth, Rhondda, Wales
- Died: 27 November 1990 (aged 76)
- School: Porth Secondary School; Llandovery College
- University: Cambridge University

Rugby union career
- Position: Fly-half
Amateur team(s)
Years	Team	Apps	(Points)
- Cambridge University R.U.F.C.
–	Cardiff RFC		
–	London Welsh RFC		
–	Bridgend RFC		
–	Porth RFC		
–	Pontypool RFC		
–	Pontypridd RFC		
–	Barbarian F.C.		
International career
Years	Team	Apps	(Points)
1934–1938	Wales	13	(6)

Clifford 'Cliff' William Jones OBE (12 March 1914 – 27 November 1990) was a Welsh international rugby union fly-half who played club rugby for many teams but is most associated with Cardiff and Cambridge University. Jones was known as a quick and elusive runner, but was also noted for his numerous injuries which limited his international and club appearances.

== Club career ==
Jones was a product of the Welsh Secondary Schools Rugby Union system, playing competitive matches while still a schoolboy. Educated first at Porth Secondary School, and although wanting to play association football, he was forced towards rugby union as a schoolboy through the sporting curriculum of his next school, Llandovery College. Jones gained his first cap as part of the Welsh secondary schools team and came to the attention of the rugby world in a brilliant display in April 1932 in a Secondary Schools game against Yorkshire Schools. During the 1932/33 season Jones was given the captaincy of Llandovery.

Before his eighteenth birthday Jones was already playing for Pontypridd and Cardiff, but after leaving Llandovery he was accepted by Clare College, Cambridge, to read law and was selected for the Cambridge University rugby team. While there he teamed up with Wilf Wooller, though they both found themselves on the same losing side during the 1933 Varsity match.

Jones managed only 22 appearances for Cardiff, mainly due to injuries sustained on the pitch. He suffered four broken bones before he reached the age of twenty, missed much of the 1936/37 season with a broken collar bone and injured his elbow on a comeback game in 1939.

=== International rugby career ===
Jones was first capped for Wales in 1934, while still at Cambridge, at Cardiff Arms Park against England. The team is recognised as a mess, with 13 of the players being new caps resulting in an unbalanced pack with slow service. Jones was battered by England's Fry and Hordern which left him in tears during the game. Wales lost the game 9-0 and 5 of the new caps were never selected again, though Jones was not amongst them, returning for the next two games of the tournament against Scotland and Ireland; both saw Welsh wins. Jones returned to the Welsh squad the next year in the 1935 Home Nations Championship, and in the second game of the tournament against Scotland he scored his first International try.

1935 saw the touring New Zealand team arrive in Wales and Jones was selected for Wales to face them. Jones was a controversial choice as his inclusion split the half back unit of Haydn Tanner and Willie Davies who had been key in Swansea's victory over the All Blacks three months previous. In a tight game, which saw Wales's Don Tarr leave the field with a broken neck, Jones finished on the winning team as the All Blacks lost 12–13. In 1936 Jones played in all three games of the Home Nations Championship which saw Wales raise the trophy, scoring his second and final international try, again against Scotland. He missed the 1937 tournament as he was suffering from a broken collar bone.

In 1938 Jones was selected to captain Wales for all three Championship games. The first game was against England in which Wales and Jones in particular were impressive in a 14–8 win. Wales may well have taken the title, after also beating Ireland, but were denied a win when Scotland were awarded a penalty two minutes before time when an unconscious Welsh player was deemed to be lying purposefully on the ball. Scotland successfully converted the penalty to win 8–6. Jones finished his Wales career captaining his team and narrowly missing the Grand Slam.

=== International matches played for Wales ===
Wales

- England 1934, 1935, 1936, 1938
- Ireland 1934, 1935, 1936, 1938
- New Zealand 1935
- Scotland 1934, 1935, 1936, 1938

== Later life ==
Jones remained in rugby after he retired from playing. He became a national selector and was central in devising coaching policies for the Welsh Rugby Union as Chairman of the WRU Coaching Sub-Committee. In the 1980–1981 season, Jones became President of the WRU in their centenary year.

Jones was appointed Officer of the Order of the British Empire (OBE) in the 1979 New Year Honours "for services to rugby football in Wales", and in 1991 was inducted into the Welsh Sports Hall of Fame. He died on 27 November 1990.

== Bibliography ==
- Billot, John (1972). All Blacks in Wales. Ferndale: Ron Jones Publications.
- Godwin, Terry (1984). The International Rugby Championship 1883-1983. London: Willows Books. ISBN 0-00-218060-X.
- Smith, David; Williams, Gareth (1980). Fields of Praise: The Official History of The Welsh Rugby Union. Cardiff: University of Wales Press. ISBN 0-7083-0766-3.
- Thomas, Wayne (1979). A Century of Welsh Rugby Players. Ansells Ltd.
