= Jack Best (rugby union) =

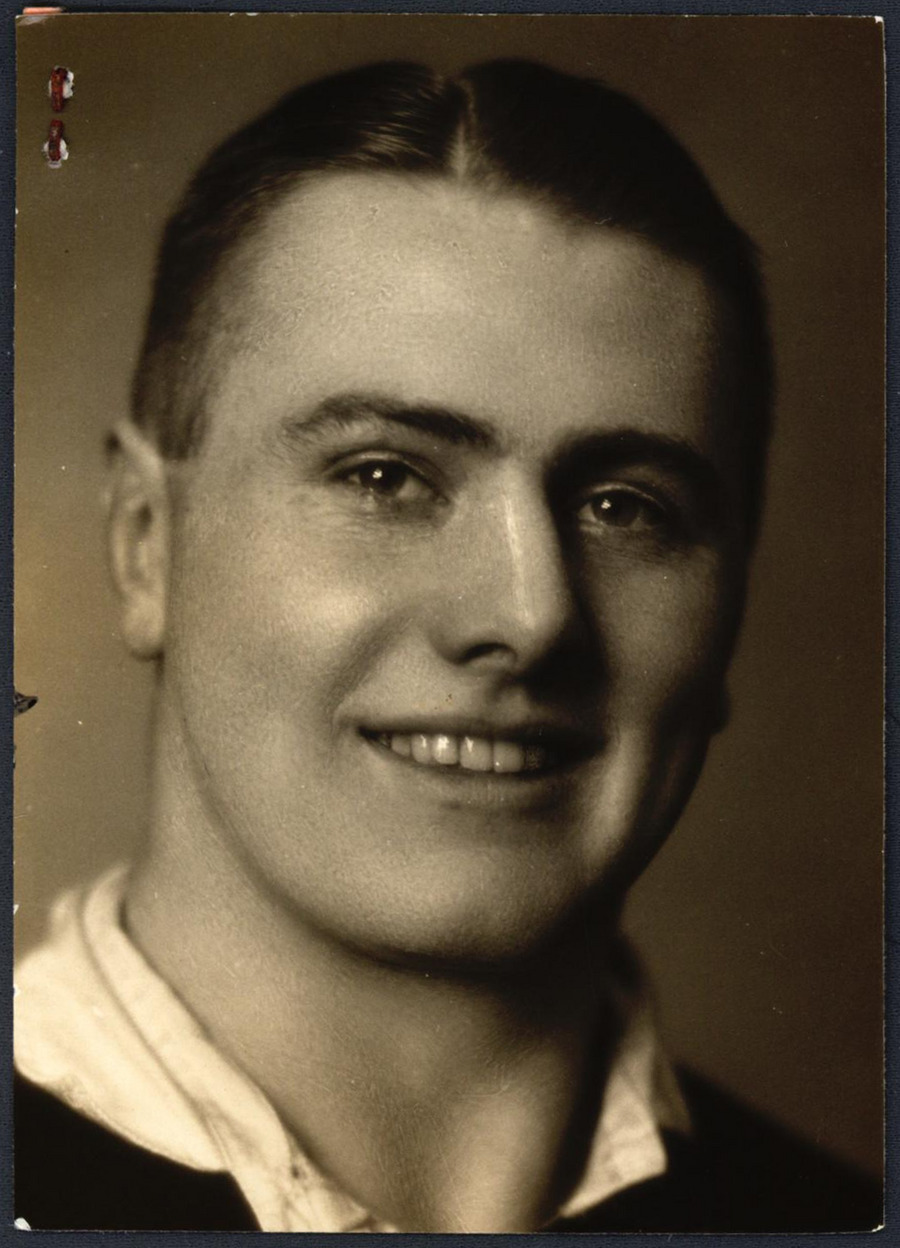
- John in 1935
- Born: John Jeffries Best; 19 March 1914 Blenheim, New Zealand
- Died: 25 May 1994 (aged 80) Blenheim, New Zealand
- Height: 1.83 m (6 ft 0 in)
- Weight: 92 kg (203 lb)
- School: St Patrick's College, Silverstream
- Occupation: Farmer

Rugby union career
- Position: Loose forward
Provincial / State sides
Years	Team	Apps	(Points)
- Marlborough
- Waikato
1938–39	Bay of Plenty		
International career
Years	Team	Apps	(Points)
1935–36	New Zealand	(0)	(0)

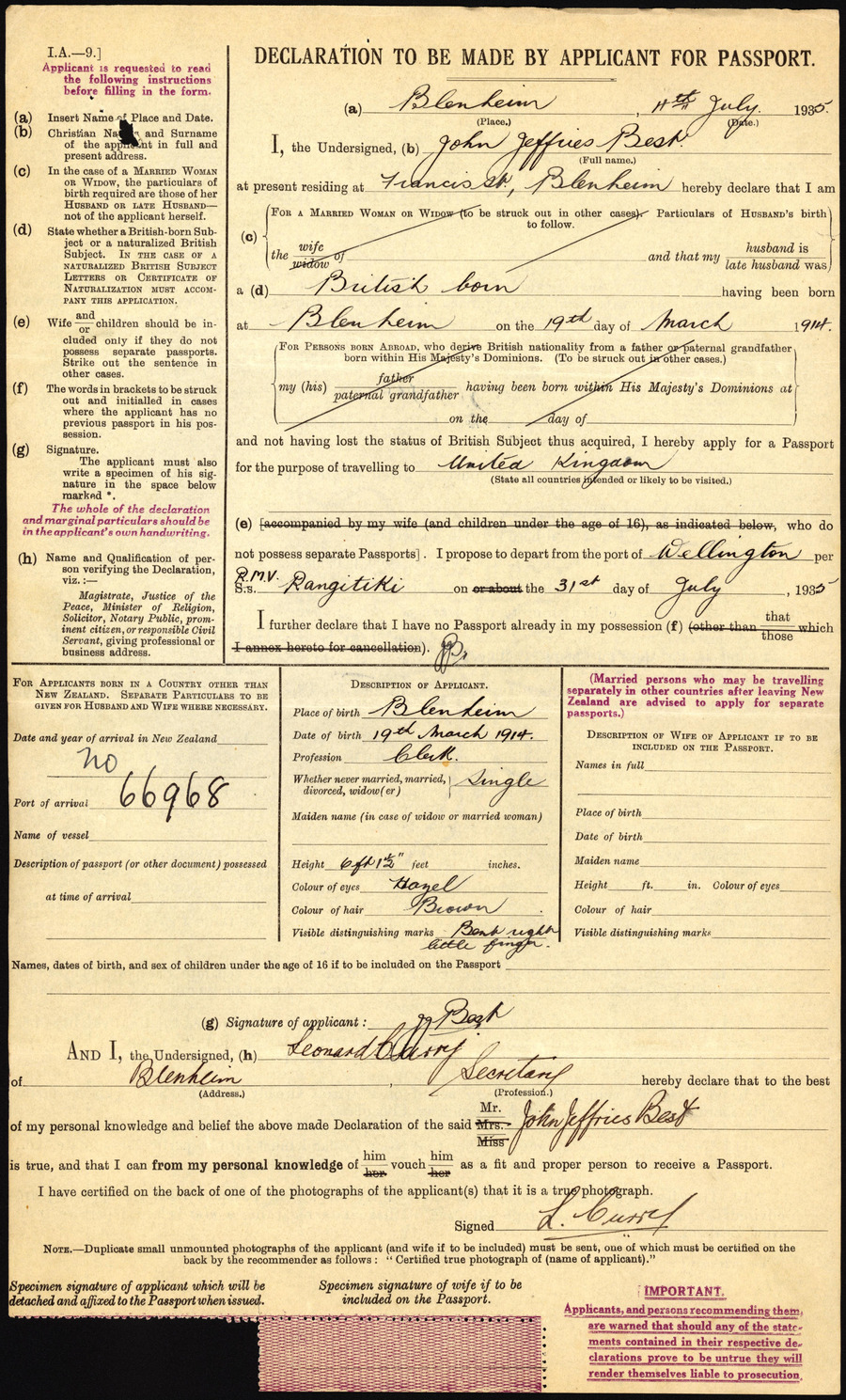
John Jeffries Best passport application (1935)

John Jeffries Best (19 March 1914 – 25 May 1994) was a New Zealand rugby union player. A loose forward, Best represented Marlborough, Waikato, and Bay of Plenty at a provincial level. He was a member of the New Zealand national side, the All Blacks, on their 1935–36 tour of the British Isles and Canada but broke his collarbone in his first game and only played in six matches on the tour, and did not appear in any of the test matches.

Best died in Blenheim on 25 May 1994, and was buried at Fairhall Cemetery.
