= Heinsius =

Heinsius is a surname of Dutch and German origin. Notable people with that surname include:

- Anthonie Heinsius (1641–1720), Dutch statesman
- Daniel Heinsius (1580–1655), Dutch scholar and poet
- Gottfried Heinsius (1709–1769), German mathematician, geographer and astronomer
- Johann Julius Heinsius (1740–1812), German oil painter and miniaturist
- Johann Samuel Heinsius (1686–1750), German bookseller and publisher
- Nicolaas Heinsius the Elder (1620–1681), Dutch scholar and poet, son of Daniel Heinsius
- Nicolaas Heinsius the Younger (1655–1718), Dutch physician and writer, son of Nicolaas the Elder

== See also ==
- Heinsius (crater), on the Moon, named after Gottfried Heinsius
