= Nikolaes Heinsius =

Nikolaes Heinsius may refer to:

- Nikolaes Heinsius the Elder (1620–1681), scholar and poet
- Nikolaes Heinsius the Younger (1655–1718), his son, novelist
