= Brown (crater) =

Crater on the Moon

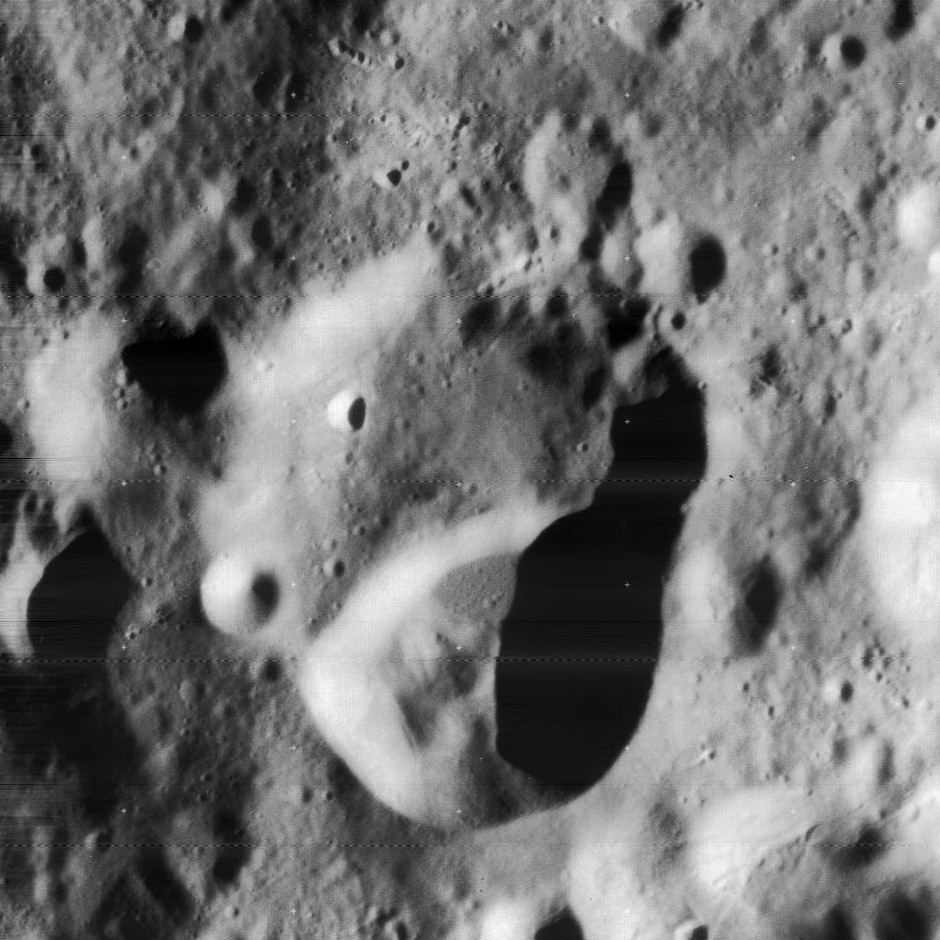
- Lunar Orbiter 4 image
- Coordinates: 46.4°S 17.9°W
- Diameter: 34.03 km (21.15 mi)
- Depth: 2.3 km (1.4 mi)
- Colongitude: 19° at sunrise
- Eponym: Ernest W. Brown

Brown is a lunar impact crater that is located in the southeast part of the Moon, to the southwest of the prominent ray crater Tycho. Northwest of Brown is the crater Wilhelm, and to the west is Montanari.

The rim of Brown is mis-shapen from a typical circular formation, most notably due to the intrusion of the satellite crater Brown E into the southeast of the formation. The northern rim is polygonal in shape, with a flattened northern rim. There is also a small gap in the western rim which protrudes to the west.

This crater was named after British astronomer and mathematician Ernest William Brown (1866-1938), and is distinct from crater D. Brown, a satellite feature of the Apollo crater. The former designation was officially adopted by the International Astronomical Union in 1935. His name was added to lunar nomenclature by IAU Commission 17.

== Satellite craters ==
There are eight satellite craters of Brown that are recognized by the International Astronomical Union. The official designation of these features was approved in 2006. By convention these features are identified on lunar maps by placing the letter on the side of the crater midpoint that is closest to Brouwer.

Brown	Latitude	Longitude	Diameter
A	48.1° S	17.4° W	16 km
B	44.7° S	16.1° W	12 km
C	47.6° S	17.0° W	13 km
D	46.0° S	16.1° W	20 km
E	46.8° S	17.6° W	22 km
F	46.9° S	18.3° W	6 km
G	45.5° S	16.8° W	5 km
K	46.6° S	15.6° W	16 km
