= Duchy of Bari =

Former duchy in Italy

Ducato di Bari
- Former subdivision of Kingdom of Naples
- c.1400–1557
- Coat of arms

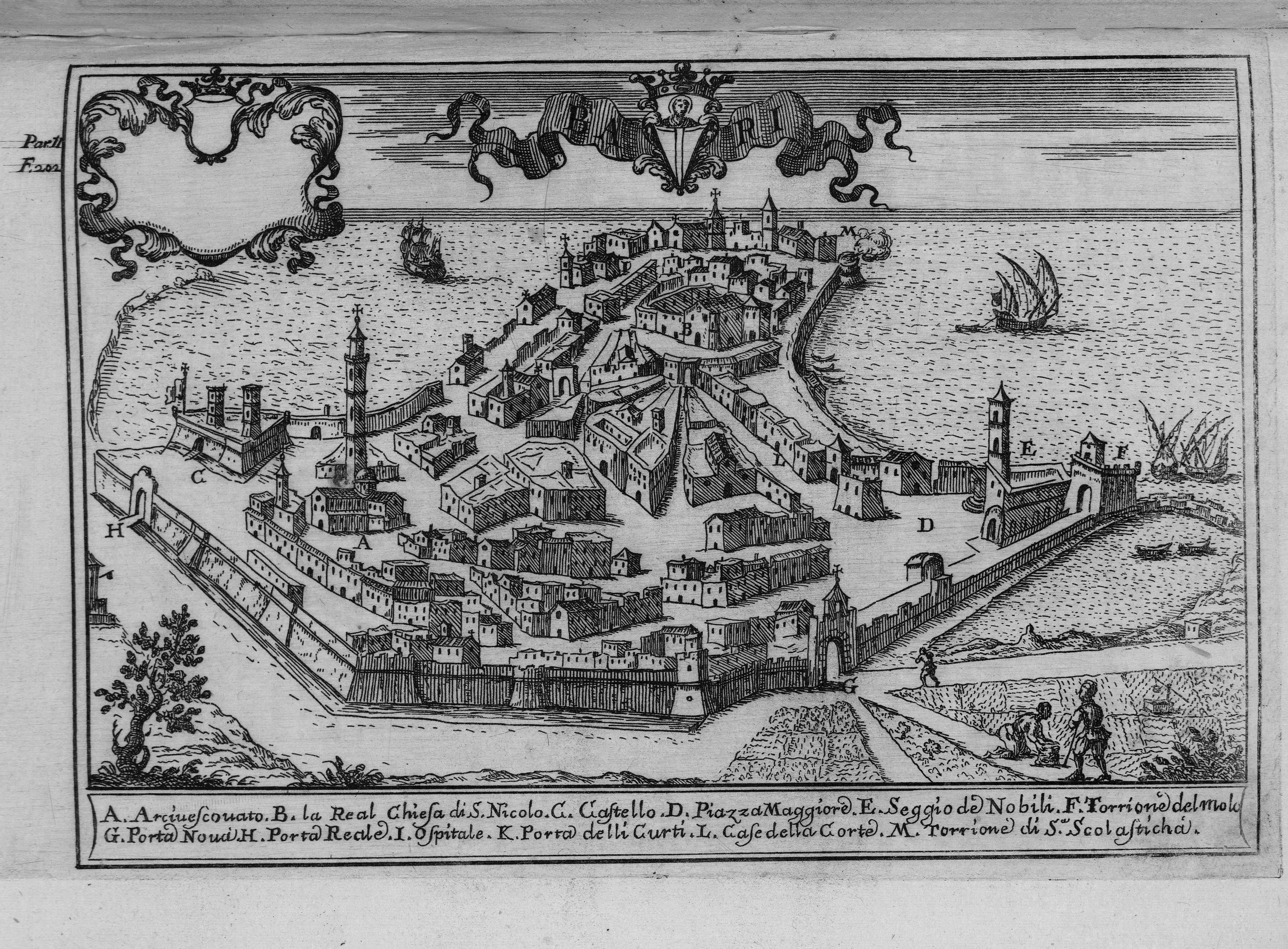
- Drawing of Bari from the work The Kingdom of Naples in Perspective by Giovan Battista Pacichelli

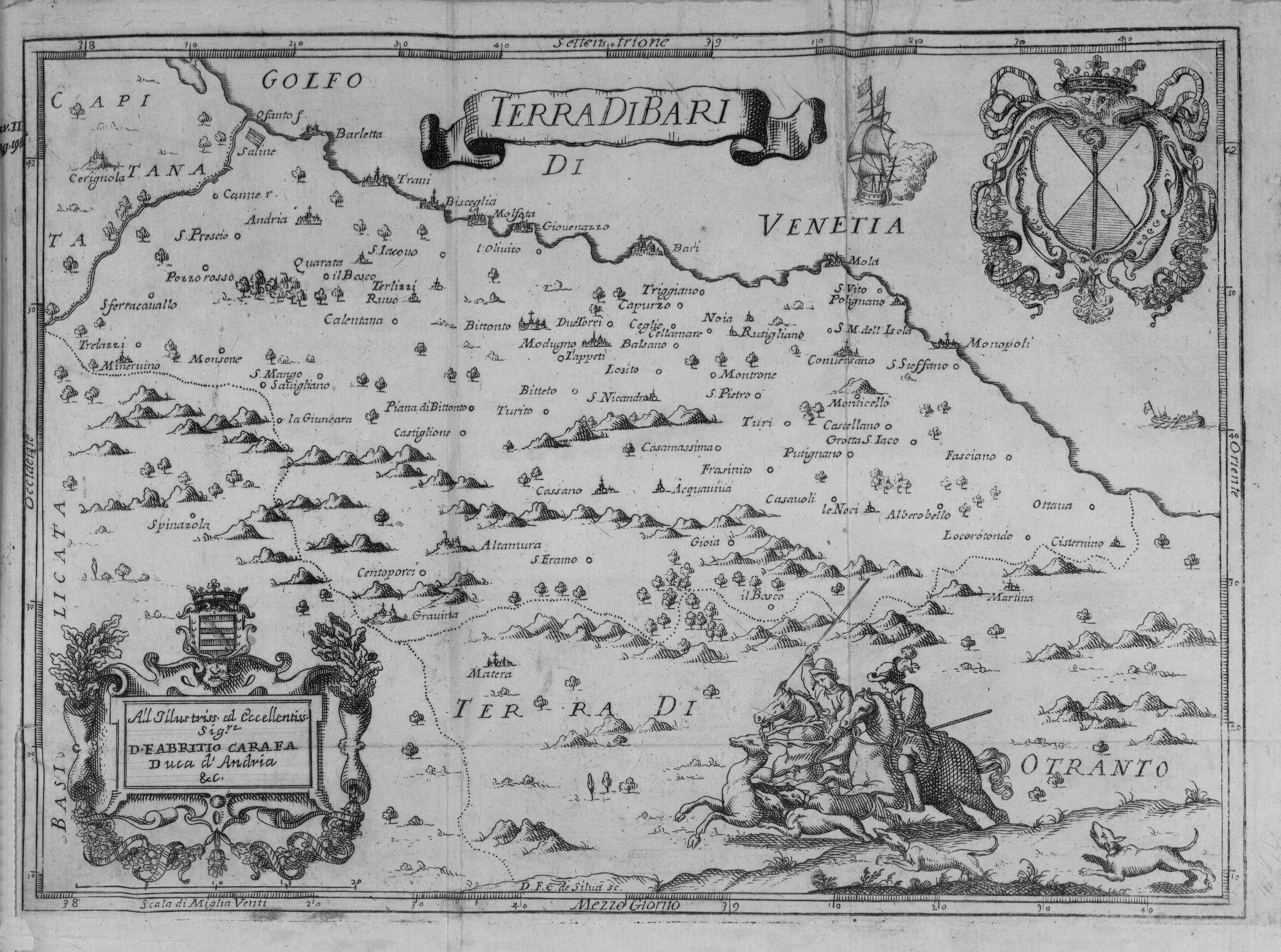
- Map of the Terra di Bari taken from the work The Kingdom of Naples in Perspective by Giovan Battista Pacichelli
- Capital: Bari
- Government
- Duke
  - c.1400–1406: Raimondo Orsini del Balzo (first)
  - 1524–1557: Bona Sforza (last)
- History
  - The Orsini family receives the title of Dukes of Bari from the King of Naples: 3 January
  - Due to the lack of legitimate heirs of the Orsini family, the Duchy passes to the Neapolitan royal demesne: 1463
  - The title is abolished by the Spanish crown: 1557

The Duchy of Bari was a significant administrative division within the Kingdom of Naples, comprising several territories, including Acquaviva delle Fonti, Bari, Modugno, Ostuni (incorporated into the duchy in 1506), Palo del Colle, and Rossano. Bari, as the capital, functioned as a key administrative and economic center in the region, influencing trade and political activities. The included territories each contributed distinct characteristics to the duchy; for instance, Acquaviva delle Fonti is recognized for its agricultural output, while Ostuni is noted for its historical architecture.

Historically, the Duchy of Bari reflects the complex cultural interactions in southern Italy, influenced by various ruling powers such as the Byzantine Empire, Norman conquerors, and Spanish authorities. The region experienced fluctuations in prosperity and conflict, which shaped the lives of its inhabitants and the broader context of the Kingdom of Naples. In addition to its political and economic roles, the duchy played a part in the cultural development of the area, fostering artistic and architectural advancements that are acknowledged in studies of Italian history.

== History ==
=== Under the Prince of Taranto, Orsini del Balzo ===
At the beginning of the 15th century Modugno depended on the Governor of Bari and remained so until 1440 when it came into the possession of Giovanni Antonio Orsini Del Balzo, prince of Taranto. In the first half of the 15th century, the Aragonese undertook the conquest of the Kingdom of Naples starting from Sicily. In Apulia, the dispute saw the prince of Taranto Giovanni Antonio Orsini Del Balzo on the side of the Aragonese and the mercenary captain Giacomo Caldora appointed by the Angevins as feudal lord of Bari and Bitonto. Giacomo Caldora laid siege to Modugno in late August 1436, with his son-in-law Count of Avellino Troiano Caracciolo, but was unsuccessful and contented himself with ravaging olive and almond groves in the surrounding countryside. Clashes and retaliation between the towns that sided with the two factions ended only when Alfonso of Aragon succeeded in seizing the throne of Naples in 1442 with the help of Filippo Maria Visconti. Alfonso of Aragon reconfirmed to the loyal prince of Taranto all the possessions he had won in the struggles that had just ended: Modugno was the fief of Gian Antonio Orsini and remained there for thirteen years, hated by the population for his tyrannical actions.

Orsini and the Duke of Milan Francesco Sforza also supported the Aragonese monarch during the Conspiracy of the Barons who wanted the return of the Angevins (at this time, the House of Valois-Anjou. King Ferdinand I rewarded the former with the reconfirmation in 1462 of all his possessions, including the fief of Modugno. To consolidate his alliance with the Duke of Milan, he embarked on a matrimonial policy and promised his future son-in-law Sforza Maria Sforza to grant him Rossano, the fiefdom of one of the leaders of the barons' conspiracy. However, in the course of the war, the Prince of Rossano made peace with the King of Naples Ferdinand I, who had to find an alternative to honor the promise.

The solution came through a chance event: the death without an heir of Gian Antonio Orsini, prince of Taranto and duke of Bari. This event allowed Ferdinand I to grant Francesco Sforza the Duchy of Bari, instead of the promised lands of Rossano. Upon the death of the prince of Taranto Gian Antonio Orsini, which occurred on 13 November 1463, in Altamura, his possessions, including Modugno, returned to the state property, that is, to the king of Naples. This freedom from the feudal yoke, though short-lived, would play an important role in the claims for freedom that the people of Modugno would enact in the following centuries. Ferdinand I met Modugno's ambassadors in Altamura a few days after Orsini's death and granted Modugno exemption from duties on oil exports and the Sunday market.

=== Sforza period ===
On 19 June 1464, King Ferdinand I of Naples offered Francesco Sforza the duchy of Bari and the two towns of Modugno and Palo del Colle, in place of the lands of the prince of Rossano, promised as a reward for his support in suppressing the conspiracy of the barons. Ferdinand I on 9 September 1464 issued the privilege of donation in which he stated that he had always considered “Sforza Maria Sforza among his dearest people and always loved and considered him as a son on a par with Eleonora, promised to him in his betrothal, both because of the bond of kinship and because of his singular character and the innumerable benefits received from his father Francesco [... ] He therefore gladly gives in perpetuity to him and to his legitimate heirs and successors of both sexes the city of Bari and the lands of Palo and Modugno with their castles, hamlets, men, vassals, vassals' incomes, feuds, feudatories, subfeudatories, customs, rights of the customs and any other right arising from the useful dominion, with the houses, estates, olive groves, vineyards, gardens, etc., with the court of justice for the recognition of civil cases and the other rights, jurisdictions, accounts, etc., pertaining by custom and law or otherwise to the said lands, and with the title of duchy..., agrees that Sforza Maria Sforza and his successors shall bear the title of duke of Bari in all deeds and writings, and shall enjoy the favors, liberties and honors of barons and dukes."

Before taking possession of the duchy, the Sforzas asked their representative in the kingdom of Naples, Antonio da Trezzo, to prepare a report regarding the economic situation and tax revenues of the new fiefdom of Bari, Modugno and Palo del Colle. In his letter of 14 January 1465, Antonio da Trezzo describes Modugno to the Sforza as "a large and important land, but [with] almost no revenue", that is, of little tax revenue for the duke. Although several hypotheses have been formulated, there are no documented reasons why a town like Modugno paid few taxes to the duke. In fact, Bari had tax revenues on oil production of about 6,000–7,000 ducats, while Palo del Colle had about 1,200 ducats, but at that time Modugno had a population far greater than that of Palo del Colle and about half that of Bari (Modugno was inhabited by 248 families, while Bari 582) as well as extensive olive groves.

After the Sforzas agreed to accept the Duchy of Bari, the ceremony of handing over the Duchy of Bari and the lands of Modugno and Palo to Sforza Maria Sforza, represented by Azzo Visconti, took place on 12 October 1465, in Bari at the basilica of St. Nicholas. The government of the Duchy of Bari, Modugno and Palo was held by Francesco Sforza and then his wife Bianca Maria Visconti, as their son, Sforza Maria, was a minor. The King of Naples also granted the Duke of Bari the right to collect taxes (the so-called focatico) based on “fires” (families) and to take salt free of charge from the salt pans of the Government of Naples. In this way the Duchy of Bari, Modugno and Palo was created, initiating a period, which would last about a century, of economic growth and political development, caused by increased relations with the prosperous Duchy of Milan. This was to be one of the greatest moments of splendor for Modugno.

Azzo Visconti was loved by the population and his government was fair and balanced: when he entrusted Domenico de Afflicti from Bari with the position of Captain of Modugno (the Captain was the representative of the local authority and was always a foreigner), the population made representations to Azzo about a dispute concerning the payment of collections, (Note: Collections were the annual contribution that a university (city administration) had to pay to the state based on the income from private property existing in its territory. Modugnese citizens who owned land in the territory of Bari and Bitonto refused to pay their share of the collections. Hence the dispute with Bari.) which was going on between Bari and Modugno. Visconti granted the request of the Modugnese and removed Domenico de Afflcti from office. Duke Sforza Maria Sforza praised his rectitude and loyalty to the House of Sforza and reappointed him to his role in 1467. When Azzo left office two years later, Sforza appointed his son, Gaspare Visconti, as governor.

When Francesco Sforza died, he was succeeded by his eldest son Galeazzo Maria Sforza. Galeazzo Sforza was assassinated on 26 December 1476, and Gian Galeazzo, just eight years old, became the new duke of Milan, under the regency of his mother Bona of Savoy, who enlisted the help of chancellor Cicco Simonetta. Gian Galeazzo's brothers (Sforza Maria, Ludovico, Ascanio and Ottaviano) after an unsuccessful attempt to oust Cicco Simoetta and take the regency, were driven out of Milan: Maria Sforza was sent to Bari, in his own duchy, where he devoted himself to raising renowned breeds of horses. He died without an heir on 29 July 1479, and the duchy reverted to the king of Naples. On 14 August, King Ferdinand I of Naples granted the duchy to Sforza Maria's brother Ludovico il Moro in an order dated 14 August 1479.

=== Conflict between the Duchy of Milan and the Kingdom of Naples ===
Ludovico il Moro never went to his own duchy, which was administered by governors: in 1482 it was governed by Benedetto Castiglioni, two years later by his sister Ippolita, wife of Alfonso II. The names of governors Giovanni Ermenziano and Paduano Macedonio are also mentioned. Beginning in 1480 the duchess of Bari was also named Beatrice d'Este, niece and adopted daughter of the king, by the will of her ancestor Ferrante, who gave her in marriage to Ludovico.

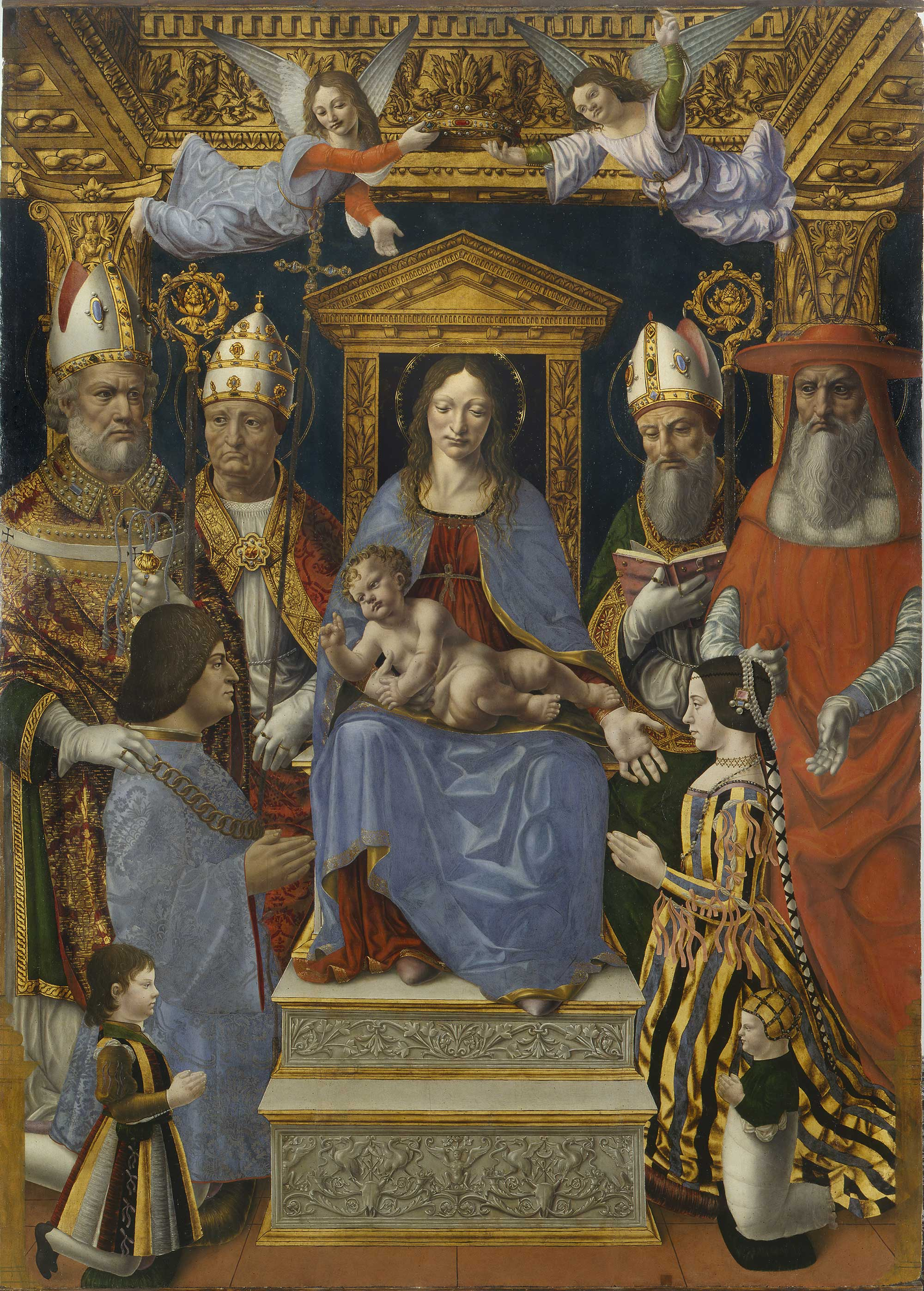
Ludovico il Moro and his wife Beatrice d'Este, dukes of Bari, in the Pala Sforzesca.

Ludovico was aiming for the Duchy of Milan and, by having Gian Galeazzo declared an adult at the age of 11, he succeeded in persuading the regent Bona of Savoy to remove Cicco Simonetta by seizing the effective government of the duchy. He also conducted a policy that oscillated between the Republic of Venice and the Kingdom of Naples. All this worried the Neapolitans and especially the heir to the throne, Alfonso II, father of Isabella betrothed to Gian Galeazzo. King Ferdinand I of Naples, was busy with the Saracens who had landed in Otranto in 1480 and with a revolt of the Barons. Ludovico il Moro helped King Ferdinand suppress the rebellion and therefore, in 1487, saw the Duchy of Bari reconfirmed, obtaining, in addition, the principality of Rossano and the counties of Burello (near Palmi), Rossano and Longobucco, which had been taken from the rebellious barons.

In 1488 a marriage was celebrated between Gian Galeazzo Sforza, age 19, and Isabella of Aragon, age 18. Isabella, in Milan, resented the power of Moro, who usurped the title of Duke from her husband. In 1493 she wrote to her father Alfonso II to denounce the situation, but the reaction sought from Alfonso II was curbed by the prudence of King Ferdinand I.

When Alfonso II ascended the throne of Naples in 1494, he immediately declared war on Moro and as the first sign of hostility had the duchies of Bari and Rossano occupied. The Aragonese army, commanded by the young Ferdinand, entered Romagna at a time when Charles VIII of France was welcomed by Ludovico il Moro, who had called him to his own aid. On 21 October 1494, Gian Galeazzo died in Pavia at the age of 25, and the next day Ludovico had himself proclaimed Duke of Milan.

Charles VIII entered Naples on 22 February 1495, and sent Macedonio Paduano, in his time governor of Bari, to occupy the duchy and the Calabrian territories on behalf of Moro. The citizens of Bari, Modugno, and Palo were happy to return under the leadership of the Sforza, who had always conducted a fair government and brought economic development. Upon the death of his beloved wife Beatrice d'Este in 1497, Ludovico (by then Duke of Milan) renounced the entire duchy in favor of their second son Sforza Francesco, who was still an infant. On 20 July 1498, the new governor, Giacomo dei Marchesi Pallavicini de' Scipione, arrived in Bari.

Later Ludovico il Moro moved to the side opposed to the French by allying himself with the Republic of Venice, the state of the Church, Ferdinand the Catholic, and the Emperor of Austria. Charles VIII had to return to France in June 1495, and Ferdinand II returned to the throne of Naples. He and his successor Federico confirmed Ludovico il Moro's possession of the duchy. Moro, however, could not take care of the duchy, and he entrusted its management to the vice-duke Giovanni Erminzani.

=== Descent to Italy of Louis XII ===
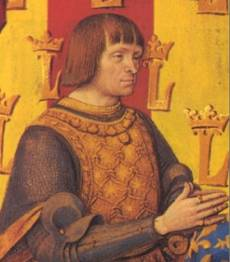
Louis XII

Charles VIII's successor, Louis XII, descended to Italy with the intention of conquering the Kingdom of Naples, and the Duchy of Milan, over which he claimed succession rights as a descendant of the Visconti on his maternal side.

Ludovico il Moro, before fleeing to Emperor Maximilian of Austria to prevent Isabella of Aragon's son Francesco from being elected duke in his absence, tried to take him with him to Germany. Over the opposition of Isabella and the Milanese population, he adopted another ploy: he granted Isabella fiefs in Apulia and Calabria, on the condition that she go there in person (later, he could have this concession declared invalid because Moro was only the usufructuary of those territories, while the duke turned out to be his son).

Isabella was stalling while waiting for Louis XII in the hope that he would have his son elected duke. He sent one of his relatives, Alessandro Pagano, to take possession of the territories in southern Italy, but Ludovico's officials refused to hand over the powers having received directives to cede the lands exclusively to Isabella. A complex situation arose in the Duchy of Bari that lasted until the defeat of Ludovico il Moro on 8 April 1500. The only person who could have resolved it, the King of Naples, Frederick, equivocated while awaiting the turn of events. When Louis XII arrived in Milan, Isabella's young son Francesco was sent to an abbey in France. Isabella of Aragon had to return to Naples, with her daughters Bona Sforza and Ippolita, because news had reached the duchy of Ludovico's imminent return aided by the emperor and Swiss mercenaries. Ludovico entered Milan on 5 February 1500, and Frederick of Naples was forced – in the wake of these successes – to recognize Moro's possession of territories in Apulia and Calabria, to the detriment of his niece Isabella. On 9 April, however, Ludovico was finally defeated at Novara. On May 24, Frederick finally granted the disputed territories to Isabella of Aragon. Louis XII, having conquered the Duchy of Milan, targeted the kingdom of Naples in accordance with the agreement with Ferdinand the Catholic by which the partitioning of the kingdom was defined. The French and Spanish armies invaded the kingdom of Naples in July 1501, and Frederick had to surrender to his adversaries. Thus ended the 59-year Aragonese rule.

=== Arrival of Isabella of Aragon in the Duchy of Bari ===
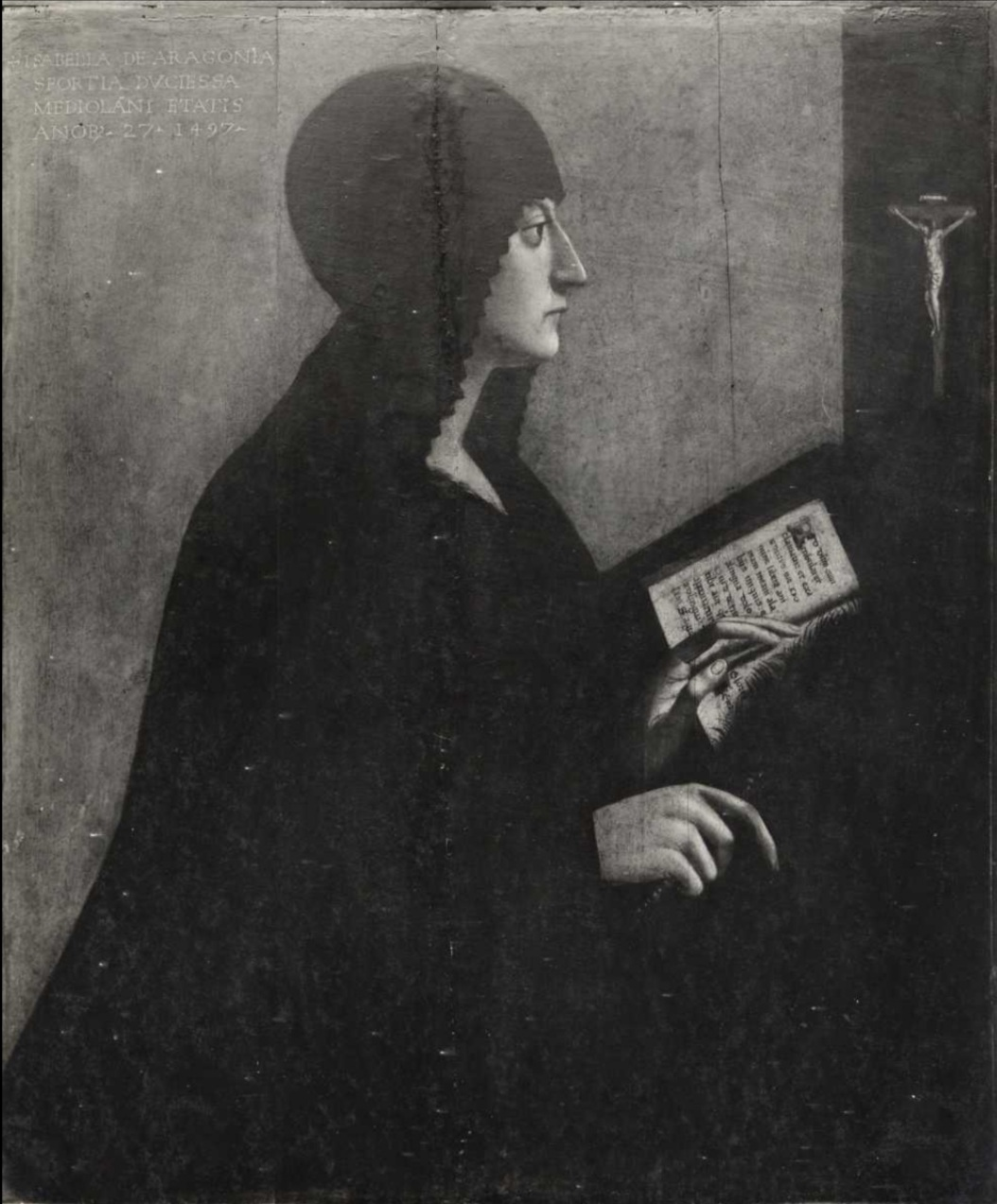
Isabella of Aragon

In 1500 the fiefdoms ruled by Isabella of Aragon consisted of Bari, Modugno and Palo in Apulia, and Rossano, Longobucco, Borrello and Rosarno in Calabria, of which, with some difficulty, Alessandro Pagano, Isabella's procurator, came into possession.

Isabella of Aragon's position as duchess of Bari, Modugno and Palo del Colle was precarious. Moro's donation was illegal because the Duke of Bari turned out to be Ludovico's son, Francesco Sforza; the confirmation of the donation had been made by King Frederick when he had already been ousted by affixing an earlier date; moreover, the new masters of southern Italy were enemies of her family. Isabella had to make an act of submission to the Spanish, who granted her permission to take possession of the duchy and other territories in Calabria. Isabella arrived in Bari in September 1501 with her daughter Bona and settled in the Norman-Swabian castle in Bari, which she had modified to adapt it with the most modern techniques of defense against firearms.

Several Lombard families, loyal to the duchess, followed her to Apulia. Already other foreign families had settled in the three cities of the duchy in the previous Sforza governments, either to engage in trade or to hold positions of power. Among the families who settled in Modugno during this period were the Cornale, Cesena, Capitaneo, and Scarli families. Isabella encouraged the integration of these new families with the local population by implementing a policy of promoting marriages.

=== War between the French and Spanish for control of southern Italy ===
The Treaty of Granada, which had united the French and Spanish for the conquest of the Kingdom of Naples, established the division of the kingdom between the two powers but, after the conquest, they began a dispute to vie for territories in southern Italy. On 24 April 1502, Spanish Grand Captain Gonzalo de Córdoba confirmed to the land of Modugno the Fair of St. Peter Martyr. At the same time, the first clashes between the Spanish and French occurred on 19 July 1502. In that context, the famous Challenge of Barletta took place on 13 February 1503.

The Spanish headquarters were in Barletta, and the consequences of the conflict were also felt in the Duchy of Bari. Isabella helped the Spaniards by sending them troops and sending supplies to the port of Barletta. When the French occupied nearby Bitonto they had to decide whether to lay siege to Bari, but they renounced it deeming it "ignoble and very shameful for strong men (to fight) a female".

The conflict was resolved in favor of the Spanish, who finally defeated the French at the Battle of Cerignola in 1504. The Spanish confirmed Isabella's possession of the Duchy of Bari. However, on 17 February 1507, following the peace agreements between the French and the Spanish, Isabella of Aragon had to give up the Calabrian fiefs of Borrello and Rosarno, which returned to the previous feudal lords; instead she received the Apulian fiefs of Ostuni, Villanova and Grottaglie.

Thus began the Spanish rule that lasted until 1713.

=== Isabella of Aragon's rule ===
She inherited the Duchy of Bari and managed its destiny with harmonious care and diligent intelligence, leaving one of the most grateful memories. In fact, she made trade, industry and art flourish there: in short, her duchy is linked to that brief period of rebirth that Bari experienced in the modern age.

— Vito Masellis in “History of Bari,” Italian Edition, Bari 1965

Isabella of Aragon introduced in her small duchy the spirit of renewal and the ability to invest in public works characteristic of the Duchy of Milan. With her authoritarian but enlightened government, she increased the prosperity of her fiefdom; she sought to boost trade by extending the privileges granted to the Milanese also to merchants from other cities. She implemented several initiatives in favor of the people: she supervised public officials so that they did not abuse the population; she defended the privilege of access to the salt pans of the Kingdom of Naples; she defended the citizens of the duchy in disputes with neighboring cities; and she exempted peasants from paying duties on the grinding of olives. She favored public education by getting each convent to entrust two friars with the task of teaching the populace; she granted facilities to teachers such as increased salaries, exemption from allowances and free housing.

She loved to surround herself with artists and men of letters; she called the Modugnese writer Amedeo Cornale to court. The first book printed in Bari dates from this period (the work of Nicola Antonio Carmignano from 1535, now preserved in the Civic Museum of Bari). Public works created in Bari by Isabella of Aragon include the rebuilding of the pier, the renovation of the castle (later modifications replaced elements introduced by the duchess) and the project to surround the city with a canal to improve its defense.

Isabella is blamed for her oppressive fiscal policy promoted by her minister Giosuè De Ruggiero (who, moreover, managed to buy the fiefdom of Binetto in 1511 and who was kicked out when the duchess died). Fiscal harshness was increased when her daughter Bona Sforza married King Sigismund I the Old.

Modugnese citizens also complained about the abuse of their archbishop Gian Antonio De Ruggiero (elected archbishop through the intercession of his powerful brother Giosuè), who took advantage of his position to enrich himself. The harassment continued even when Gian Antonio De Ruggiero became bishop of Ostuni in 1517 (in 1507 Isabella of Aragon had taken possession of that city's fiefdom in place of the two Calabrian towns of Burello and Rosarno) and retained the benefices of the Modugnese churches. The people, exasperated, wrote a letter in 1527 to Duchess Bona, who succeeded her mother Isabella, denouncing the situation in very harsh tones, and, subsequently, they demanded that no other archpriest be elected who was not from Modugno. No other foreign archpriest is recorded until 1826 when Nicola Affatani of Gioia del Colle was elected.

=== Marriage of Bona Sforza and last years of Isabella ===
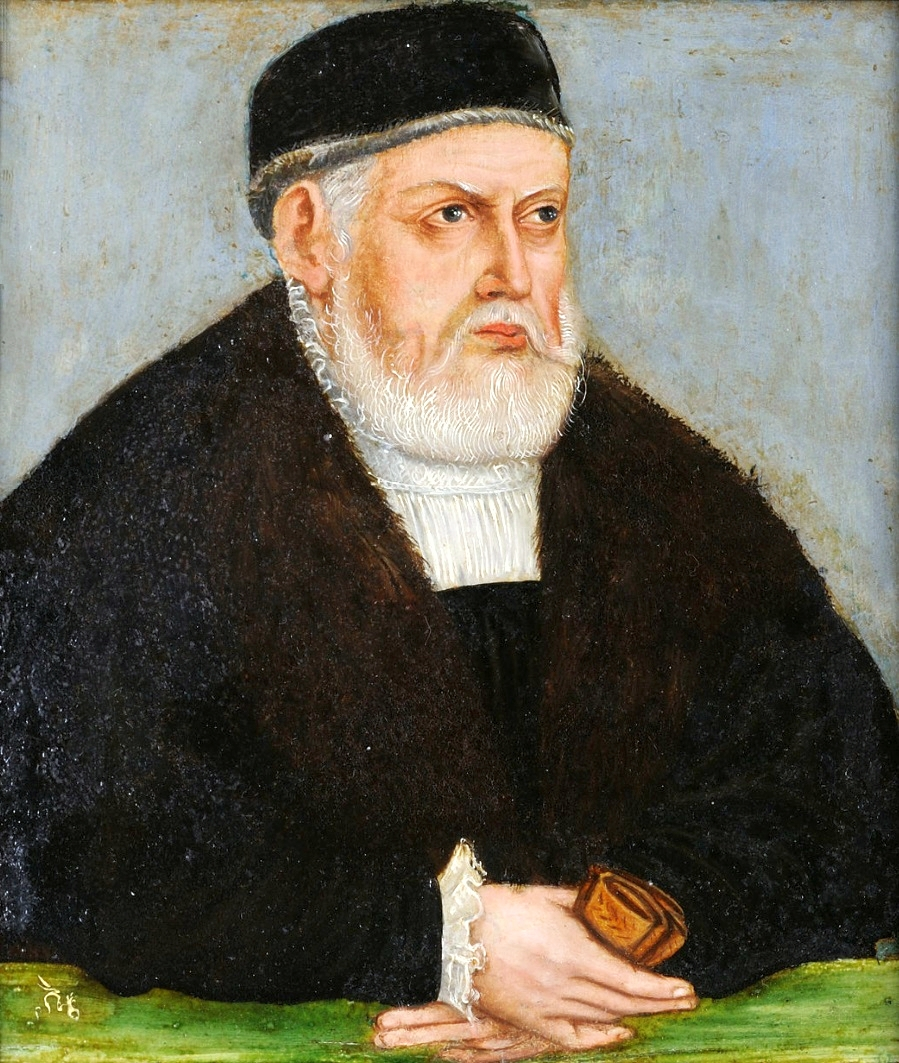
Sigismund I the Old

With the loss of her children (she was left with only Bona), Isabella of Aragon saw her hopes of regaining the Duchy of Milan fading. Isabella attempted to give her daughter in marriage to Maximilian Sforza, eldest son of Ludovico il Moro, who had become Duke of Milan in 1513. In 1515, however, the new king of France, Francis I, returned in possession of the duchy.

At that point, after several contacts, there was a move toward the aging king of Poland, Sigismund I the Old. Bona brought as dowry the Duchy of Bari (which she would receive upon Isabella's death) and 500,000 ducats. For the dowry and expenses of the lavish wedding, as noted above, new taxes were imposed. The Chapter of Modugno contributed the sum of 300 ducats.

In addition, special prayers were requested. In the Modugnese parish register this letter from Isabella is preserved:

Dear Abbot.

When you receive this, we ask you to order all the priests of our country to celebrate the Mass of the Holy Spirit every Monday, beginning with the first one that comes next, and to pray to our Lord God to make us content with what we desire.

Bari, 9 January 1517

— Letter from Isabella of Aragon to the Archpriest of Modugno

The wedding was celebrated with great pomp in Naples on 6 December 1517, and the festivities lasted ten days. On 3 February 1518 Bona left for Poland from where she administered her duchy from the death of her mother until 1556 when she returned.

On several occasions Isabella offered to join her daughter in Poland, but she always had to give up. In October 1519, for the birth of Bona's firstborn son, she set out but war broke out in Poland and she had to stop in Rome where she was received by Pope Julius II.

While Isabella was in Naples, a plague epidemic broke out in the south. The duchess contracted the disease and despite her illness, she wanted to travel to her duchy to direct the succession to her own daughter. She died in Naples, in Castel Capuano, on 12 February 1524 at the age of 54.

=== Disputes after the succession ===
Bona Sforza succeeded her mother Isabella in the leadership of the Duchy of Bari. On May 24, 1524, she appointed Ludovico Alifio from Bari as governor, who had to deal with a popular insurrection that drove Minister De Ruggiero out of the city.

It is speculated that this insurrection was also fomented by Francesco II Sforza, who wanted to regain possession of the duchy. In fact, Francesco II asked for recognition of his right (the grant of the duchy had been made by Moro when he was usufructuary and not duke) from Charles V, who, wanting the return of the small duchy to the state property, preferred to go along with Francesco II's request (of ill health and without heirs) rather than Bona's (who already had an heir). A court debate was opened in which Bona was allowed to continue in the government of the Duchy.

Bona's prospects worsened when his counterpart became the emperor himself: Francesco II Sforza and Charles V were allied against Francis I of France. When the latter was defeated in the decisive battle of Pavia, Charles V granted Francis II the title of Duke of Milan. Francis II in thanksgiving gave the emperor the (disputed) territories of Apulia and Calabria.

Bona's situation seemed further and completely compromised when Vito Pisanelli, former secretary to Frederick I of Naples, made his deposition to the court on 8 January 1528. Pisanelli declared that the document by which the king granted the duchy to Isabella bore a date prior to when it was actually compiled (25 July 1501), when the king had already been dethroned. Charles V preferred to overlook it and leave the duchy to Bona Sforza. The motivation for this gesture must be sought in the events of the Franco-Spanish conflict.

Francis I of France, after the first defeat promoted the League of Cognac (1526) to resume the fight with his rival Charles V who called in the Landsknechts who sacked Rome. Francis I sent to Italy the army commanded by General Lautrec who fought the Landsknechts in southern Italy and in January 1528 arrived in Apulia, from whose ports he could receive supplies from the allied Republic of Venice.

Bona Sforza, despite the advance of the French declared her loyalty to the Spanish. Lautrec's troops attacked the tower of Sant'Andrea, which was along the road between Modugno and Bari, being repulsed by the tower's garrison. The war continued with devastation by the French and the Spanish, and the township of Balsignano was probably destroyed during this period. In the events of the war, the French faction gained the upper hand in the territory of central Apulia, and the people of Bari opened their gates to the French and their Venetian allies on 16 June 1528, while the pro-Spanish faction took refuge in the castle. Despite the local victory of the French, the war ended in favor of Charles V with the Peace of Cambrai on 5 August 1529. Duchess Bona's Spanish support was rewarded with the reconfirmation of her possessions.

=== Bona's rule (1524–1557) ===
Bona, until 1556, administered her duchy from Poland. Her rule was strict and authoritarian, but also magnanimous and benevolent to her subjects. From Poland she directed many interventions in her duchy by making donations in favor of Modugno. In 1518 (when the Duchess Isabella was still there) she granted the Chapter of Modugno 425 liras to restore the church of Maria Santissima Annunziata, granted the creation of an eight-day market in favor of the church of Sant'Eligio (now the church of San Giuseppe delle Monacelle), and had a hospital built for the poor near the same church.

Bona tried to alleviate the suffering of the duchy's population, which often suffered from drought, by having several wells built. In Modugno, she had a 60-meter-deep well built along the road leading to Carbonara, which remained visible until 1960. Another of the public wells built by Bona Sforza is still present today in Bari behind the Cathedral of San Sabino and bears the Latin inscription, “Come, O poor, with gladness and drink without charge the water that Bona, Queen of Poland, provided for you.”

Among the various public works she promoted for public health, she had a canal built along the walls of Modugno to prevent sewage from stagnating in the streets and causing disease.

Queen Bona brought with her to the court of Sigismund I several men of letters and culture, whom she made her ministers. These included the Modugnese Scipione Scolaro, Girolamo Cornale (Amedeo's brother) and Vito Pascale, who was so highly esteemed at court that when the latter asked to return to his homeland, the young Sigismund II of Poland asked him to stay by appointing him chancellor.

It is possible, but there is no certain information about it, that the queen owned her own palace in Modugno to which she went when visiting the city. It is identified in a building that still stands today near the Church of the Carmine. It is certain that Bona owned a horse stable in Modugno near the mother church.

Bona also sought to expand her duchy: in 1536 she purchased the town of Capurso, and in 1542 she also bought the county of Noia and Triggiano. To reach the amount needed to purchase the county (68,000 ducats) she imposed new taxes on her fiefs, and on this occasion the University of Bari (municipal administration) complained to the queen that Modugno was “lauded and loved more than this city (Bari) by M.V. (your majesty).”

=== Return from Poland ===
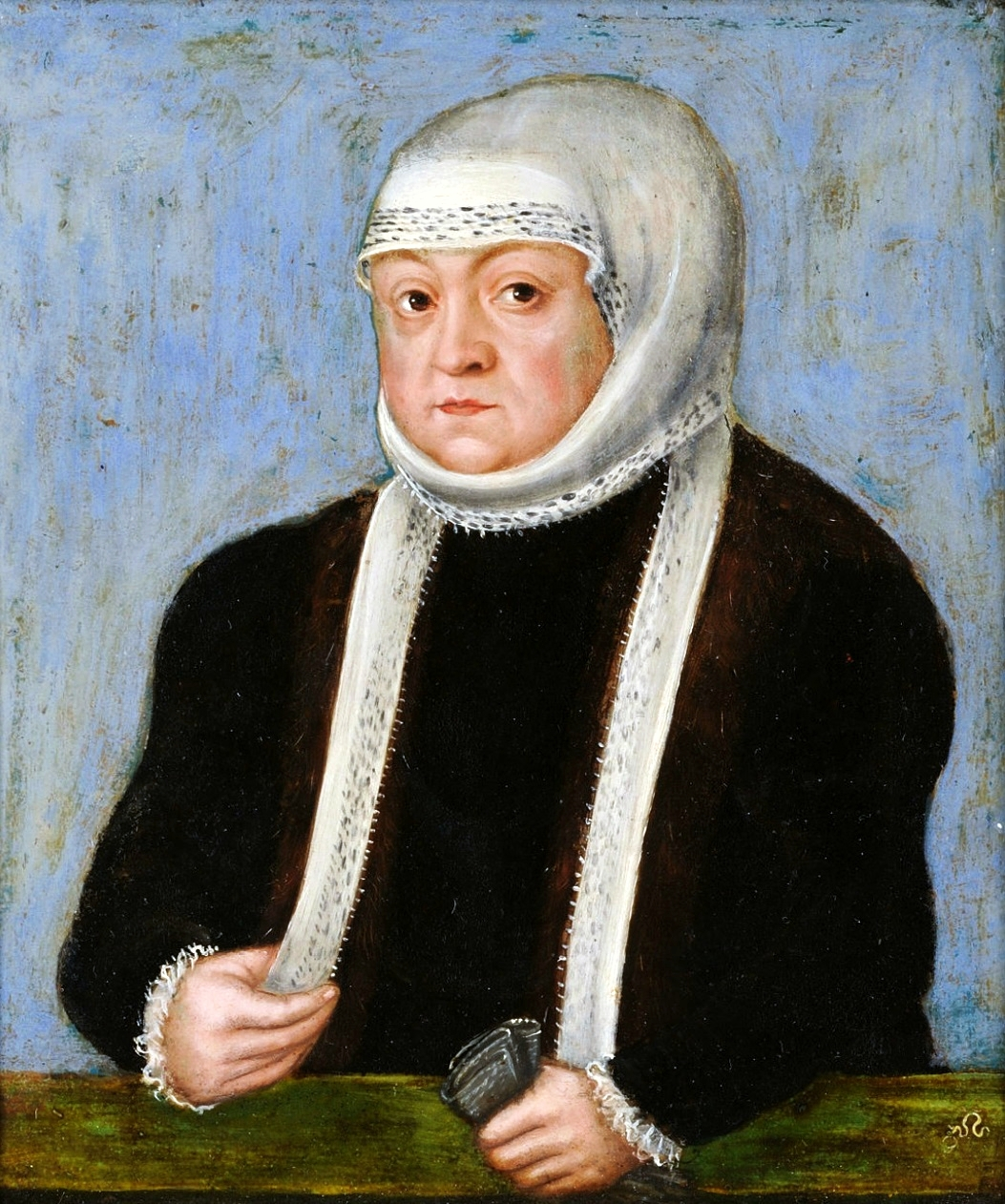
Bona Sforza

After the death of her husband resulting in the accession to the throne of her son Sigismund Augustus, the proud Bona Sforza began to ponder her return to Italy. Subsequently, her son took as his second wife Barbara Radziwiłł, daughter of Baron Jerzy Radziwiłł, an adherent of Lutheranism. Bona could not bear the fact that a subject of hers, the daughter, moreover, of a heretic, would become queen of Poland. His opposition to Barbara was such that, when she died, Bona was accused of commissioning her murder.

Unable to endure such a climate of suspicion, she decided to return to Apulia, saying that she needed a healthier climate and would soon return. Nevertheless, her sons, the senate and the Polish population tried to oppose Bona's departure, recognizing her as the cause of Poland's unprecedented progress.

Before she left, she wanted to settle the situation regarding the attribution of the duchy, which in 1528 Charles V had granted her only pending the conclusion of the ongoing trial. To secure her possession of it, Bona proposed to Charles V that she renounce any right of succession for her possessions in southern Italy on the condition that she could keep them until her death. Charles V agreed.

From Poland she traveled to the Republic of Venice. There she was welcomed with great ceremonies and was escorted with six galleys to Bari, where she arrived on 12 January 1556, welcomed by the jubilant population. Bona settled in the castle from where she oversaw the government of her own duchy. She called artists and men of letters to her court as she had done in Warsaw.

After the queen, her Modugnese advisers Scipione Scolaro and Vito Pascale also returned to Apulia. The latter when he was still in Poland, on 5 December 1550 had been given by the University of Modugno a piece of land overlooking the main square where the Pascale-Scarli palace was built).

In November 1557 Queen Bona Sforza died of a mysterious illness in the castle of Bari. A will was found in which she left the duchies of Bari and Rossano to King Philip II of Spain, the towns of Triggiano, Capurso and Noia to the powerful minister Gian Lorenzo Pappacoda and several donations to the poor and churches of the duchy. Her body lies in the Basilica of St. Nicholas of Bari.

=== Spanish viceroyalty ===
Philip II acquired the territories that belonged to the queen, but Sigismund Augustus protested, saying that the will had been made by Minister Pappacoda when she was ill. The matter was placed before Emperor Ferdinand, who decided in favor of Philip II. Modugno passed into the hands of the Spanish crown but, as Philip II needed money, he sold the fief in 1558 to the viceroy of Sicily Don Garcia de Toledo for 44,000 ducats. Upon the death of the viceroy, Modugno returned to the crown's disposal.

By 1529 Spain was in possession of Lombardy, the Kingdom of the Two Sicilies, Sardinia and the State of the Presidi. Spain ruled these territories through viceroys and regarded Italy as a colony to be exploited economically and as a frontier territory to defend against the Turks.

One of the characteristics of Spanish rule was an increased tax burden that was concentrated more on the poor since the great feudal lords and clergy were exempt. The numerous wars, royal marriages, various court events, and the formation of new armies required an enormous amount of money, and the Spanish government was forced to use every means to increase revenue: taxes, loans, furnishings (sale of tax collection rights), issuance of devalued currency, cession of fiefs, and sale of privileges and noble titles. To get an idea of how much the tax burden had increased, it is enough to remember that at the beginning of Spanish rule the revenue was 2 million ducats, and by the middle of the 17th century it was 116 million. Of this money, little or nothing was spent for the benefit of the people or for the development of trade and infrastructure.

All the economic hardships caused four-fifths of the population to fall into poverty, and the government's neglect of hygienic conditions caused epidemics to spread: most of the plagues occurred during the period of Spanish rule. Frequent famines decimated the population given the widespread state of malnutrition among the inhabitants of southern Italy.

This misery led many people to turn to crime and increased the phenomenon of brigandage, which was feared but supported by the population as a form of struggle against the domination of those in power.

The danger of raids by Turkish pirates also persisted in Apulia. In 1647 Governor Giorgio Sguerra de Rozas was sent to Bari to counter a possible landing of Turks, and some Spanish companies also stayed in Modugno. Cities that hosted military garrisons were obliged to provide sustenance for the troops at great expense to municipal coffers. It was considered a privilege not to host a Spanish garrison, a privilege that had to be paid for. The city, in 1619, took out a mortgage of 2,500 ducats to provide for the maintenance of some companies of soldiers.

The soldiers, moreover, carried out all sorts of abuses on the populations who responded from time to time with riots. These often backfired on the population itself since they had no chance to change the situation (during the revolts they acclaimed Spain and the King). The revolt started in Naples by Masaniello in 1647 also spread to Apulia and in Bari the riots were led by Paolo Ribecco.

=== Dissolution and abolition of the Duchy of Bari ===
The Spanish, upon their establishment in southern Italy, had to deal with the overwhelming power of the Barons who heavily influenced the decisions of the central government. To counteract the great power concentrated in the hands of the feudal lords, the government of the Spanish viceroyalty of Naples intervened with a twofold strategy: fragment the large estates and sell the small fiefdoms separately; and encourage the release from serfdom of the enfeoffed towns, which, by paying a fee, could acquire state freedom by depending directly on the king's authority. This system allowed the cities to no longer submit to the abuses of feudal lords, but it was often detrimental to the cities themselves: in order to pay the fee, many cities went into debt and were forced to seek the return of a feudal lord. In addition, the Spanish viceroyalty used this mechanism to acquire money by reselling the redeemed towns to new feudal lords. “There were towns that were bought three times. This stands as testimony to the terror that the towns had of the barons, the spirit of sacrifice of the populations and the injustice of the Spanish sovereign."

The year following the death of Bona Sforza, with the return of the territories of Bari, Modugno and Palo del Colle to the Spanish Crown, Modugno and Palo were given as a fief to Don Garcia de Toledo with the prohibition of reselling them. In this manner, upon the death of the viceroy of Sicily, the territories reverted to the state property. By letters dated 3 July and 26 August 1581, Philip II again sold Modugno for 40 000 ducats to the Genoese Ansaldo Grimaldi, his adviser. Palo was sold for 50 000 ducats to Grimaldi's mother-in-law, Brigida de Mari. These sales had no stipulations.

== Dukes of Bari ==
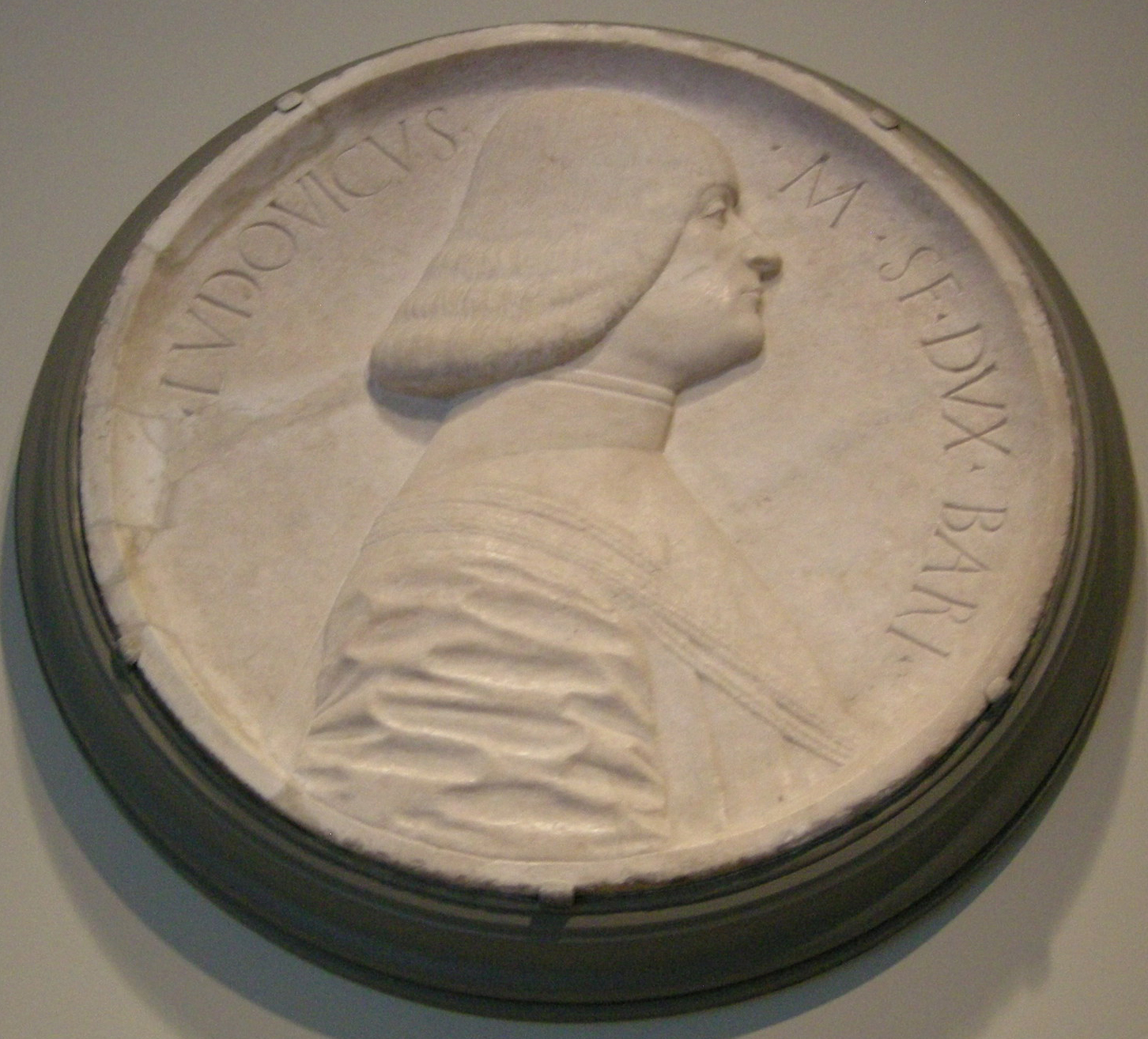
Benedetto Briosco, Bas—relief of the Duke of Bari Ludovico Sforza, c. 1490

- Raimondo Orsini del Balzo;
- Jacopo Caldora (1432–1439);
- Antonio Caldora (1439–1440);
- Giovanni Antonio Orsini del Balzo (1440–1463);
  - for lack of legitimate heirs, the duchy passed to the royal Neapolitan state property
- Sforza Maria Sforza (1464–1479);
- Ludovico Sforza (1479–1500);
- Sforza Francesco II Sforza (1497–1535);
- Isabella of Aragon (1501–1524);
- Bona Sforza (1524–1557);
  - the duchy passed to the Crown of Spain
- Giovanni Carafa (1558–1561).

== Bibliography ==
- Bosisio, Alfredo (1978). Storia di Milano [History of Milan] (in Italian) (3 ed.). Firenze-Milano: Giunti-Martello.
- Brancaccio, Giovanni (2001). Nazione genovese: consoli e colonia nella Napoli moderna [Genoese nation: consuls and colony in modern Naples] (in Italian). Napoli: Guida Editori. ISBN 978-88-7188-444-8.
- Biliński, Bronislaw, ed. (1987). La Regina Bona Sforza tra Puglia e Polonia. Atti del convegno promosso dall'Associazione culturale 'Regina Bona Sforza' sotto il Patrocinio della Regione Puglia della Provincia, del comune e dell'Università di Bari: Bari, Castello svevo, 27 aprile 1980 (in Italian and Spanish). Wrocław: Ossolineum; Zakład Narodowy im. Ossolińskich, Wydawn. Polskiej Akademii Nauk. ISBN 978-83-04-02415-1. [Queen Bona Sforza between Puglia and Poland – Proceedings of the conference promoted by the cultural association 'Regina Bona Sforza' under the patronage of the Puglia Region, the Province, the municipality and the University of Bari: Bari, Castello svevo, 27 April 1980]. ISBN 83-04-02415-2
- Cioffari, Gerardo (2000). Bona Sforza. Donna del rinascimento tra Italia e Polonia [Bona Sforza. Renaissance woman between Italy and Poland] (in Italian). Bari: Centro Studi Nicolaiani; Levante. ISBN 9788879492188.
- De Arrieta, Filippo (1694). Raguaglio historico del contagio occorso nella provincia di Bari negli anni 1690, 1691 e 1692 [Historical account of the epidemic that occurred in the province of Bari in the years 1690, 1691, and 1692] (in Italian). Napoli.
- Dina, Achille (1921). Isabella d'Aragona Duchessa di Milano e di Bari [Isabella of Aragon, Duchess of Milan and Bari] (in Italian). Milano: Archivio storico lombardo.
- Faenza, Vito (1899). La vita di un comune dalla fondazione del Vicereame Spagnuolo alla Rivoluzione francese del 1789 [The life of a municipality from the founding of the Spanish Viceroyalty to the French Revolution of 1789] (in Italian). Trani: Vecchi.
- Francescangeli, Adriano (1 December 2012). "Il pozzo dietro la Cattedrale" [The well behind the cathedral] (in Italian).
- Giovio, Paolo (1560). Dell'historie del suo tempo di Mons. Paolo Giovio da Como, vescovo di Nocera [Of the stories of his time by Msgr. Paolo Giovio of Como, bishop of Nocera] (in Italian).
- Houben, Hubert, ed. (2008). La conquista turca di Otranto (1480): Tra storia e mito. Atti del convegno internazionale di studio: Otranto-Muro Leccese, 28–31 marzo 2007 (in Italian). Galatina: Congedo. [The Turkish conquest of Otranto (1480): Between history and myth – Proceedings of the international study conference: Otranto-Muro Leccese, 28-31 March 2007].
- Lerra, A.; Musi, A. (2008). La rivolta del 1647–48 nelle città medie e nei centri minori del Mezzogiorno [The uprising of 1647–48 in the medium-sized cities and smaller towns of southern Italy] (in Italian). Manduria-Bari-Roma: Lacaita.
- Macina, Raffaele (1993). Modugno nell'età moderna [Modugno in the modern age] (in Italian). Modugno: Nuovi Orientamenti.
- Macina, Raffaele (2012). Balsignano. Dal degrado al recupero [Balsignano. From degradation to recovery] (in Italian). Modugno: Nuovi Orientamenti.
- Magrone, Domenico (1905). Libro rosso: privilegi dell'Università di Molfetta [Red book: privileges of the University of Molfetta] (in Italian). Trani: Vecchi.
- Mauro, Rossella (1994). A spasso per Bari vecchia. Guida per piccoli turisti [Walking around old Bari. A guide for little tourists] (in Italian). Bari: Adda. ISBN 88-8082-429-5.
- Melchiorre, Vito Antonio (1990). Il Ducato sforzesco di Bari [The Sforza Duchy of Bari] (in Italian). Bari: Adda.
- Melchiorre, Vito Antonio (2000). L'azione di governo e gli istituti giuridici del ducato barese di Isabella d'Aragona e Bona Sforza [The government action and legal institutions of the Duchy of Bari of Isabella of Aragon and Bona Sforza] (in Italian).
- Milano, Nicola (1990) [First published by Arti grafiche Ragusa (1970)]. Modugno: Memorie storiche [Modugno: historical memoirs] (in Italian) (3rd ed.). Bari, Italy: Levante. OCLC 955584838.
- Ferrorelli, Nicola (1914). Il Ducato di Bari sotto Sforza Maria Sforza e Ludovico il Moro [The Duchy of Bari under Sforza Maria Sforza and Ludovico il Moro] (PDF). Serie V, Parte seconda (in Italian). Vol. anno XLI. Milano: Archivio Storico Lombardo. [Year XLI, Series V, Part Two].
- Morelli, Giorgio (1971). Contributi a una storia del brigantaggio durante il vicereame spagnolo [Contributions to a history of brigandage during the Spanish viceroyalty] (in Italian). Societa di storia patria.
- Musi, Aurelio (1980). Fiscalità e finanza privata nel Regno di Napoli nella prima metà del secolo XVII [Taxation and private finance in the Kingdom of Naples in the first half of the 17th century] (in Italian). Roma: École Française de Rome.
- Pagano, Filippo Maria (1835). Istoria del regno di Napoli, Volume 2 [History of the Kingdom of Naples, Volume 2] (in Italian). Palermo: Tipografia Spampinato. p. 569.
- Pellegrini, Marco (2009). Le guerre d'Italia: 1494–1530 [The wars of Italy: 1494-1530] (in Italian). Bologna: Il mulino. ISBN 978-88-15-13046-4.
- Pepe, Gabriele (1952). Il Mezzogiorno d'Italia sotto gli Spagnoli [Southern Italy under the Spanish] (in Italian). Firenze: Edizioni Sansoni.
- Pepe, Ludovico (1900). Storia della successione degli Sforzeschi negli stati di Puglia e Calabria e documenti [History of the succession of the Sforzas in the states of Apulia and Calabria and documents] (in Italian). Bari: Ristampa a cura di Levante.
- Protonotari, Francisco (1880). Nuova antologia, Rivista di scienze, lettere ed arti, Volume 54, Anno XV [New Anthology, Journal of Science, Letters and Arts, Volume 54, Year XV] (in Italian). Roma: Direzione della Nuova Antologia.
- Porzio, Camillo (1565). La congivra de' Baroni del Regno di Napoli contra il Re Ferdinando I [The conspiracy of the Barons of the Kingdom of Naples against King Ferdinand I] (in Italian). Roma.
- Quagliuolo, Federico (9 December 2020). "Il banchetto di Bona Sforza e Sigismondo di Polonia: la festa di matrimonio che finì nella Storia" [The banquet of Bona Sforza and Sigismund of Poland: the wedding party that ended up in History] (in Italian).
- Tadeo, Francesco (1990). Dalla conquista normanna al ducato sforzesco, in Storia di Bari [From the Norman Conquest to the Sforza Duchy, in History of Bari.] (in Italian). Vol. 2. Bari: Laterza.
- Valente, Franco (2012). "A Bologna, sulle tracce di Giacomo Caldora".
- Vaglienti, Francesca M. (2000). "Gian Galeazzo Maria Sforza nel Dizionario Biografico degli Italiani" [Gian Galeazzo Maria Sforza in the Biographical Dictionary of Italians.] (in Italian). Treccani.
- Ventrella, Michele (2006). Memoria e storia della chiesa Maria Santissima Annunziata di Modugno. Catalogo della mostra documentaria e iconografica [Memory and history of the Maria Santissima Annunziata Church in Modugno. Catalog of the documentary and iconographic exhibition.] (in Italian). Bari: Litopress Industria Grafica.
