= Longomontanus (crater) =

Crater on the Moon

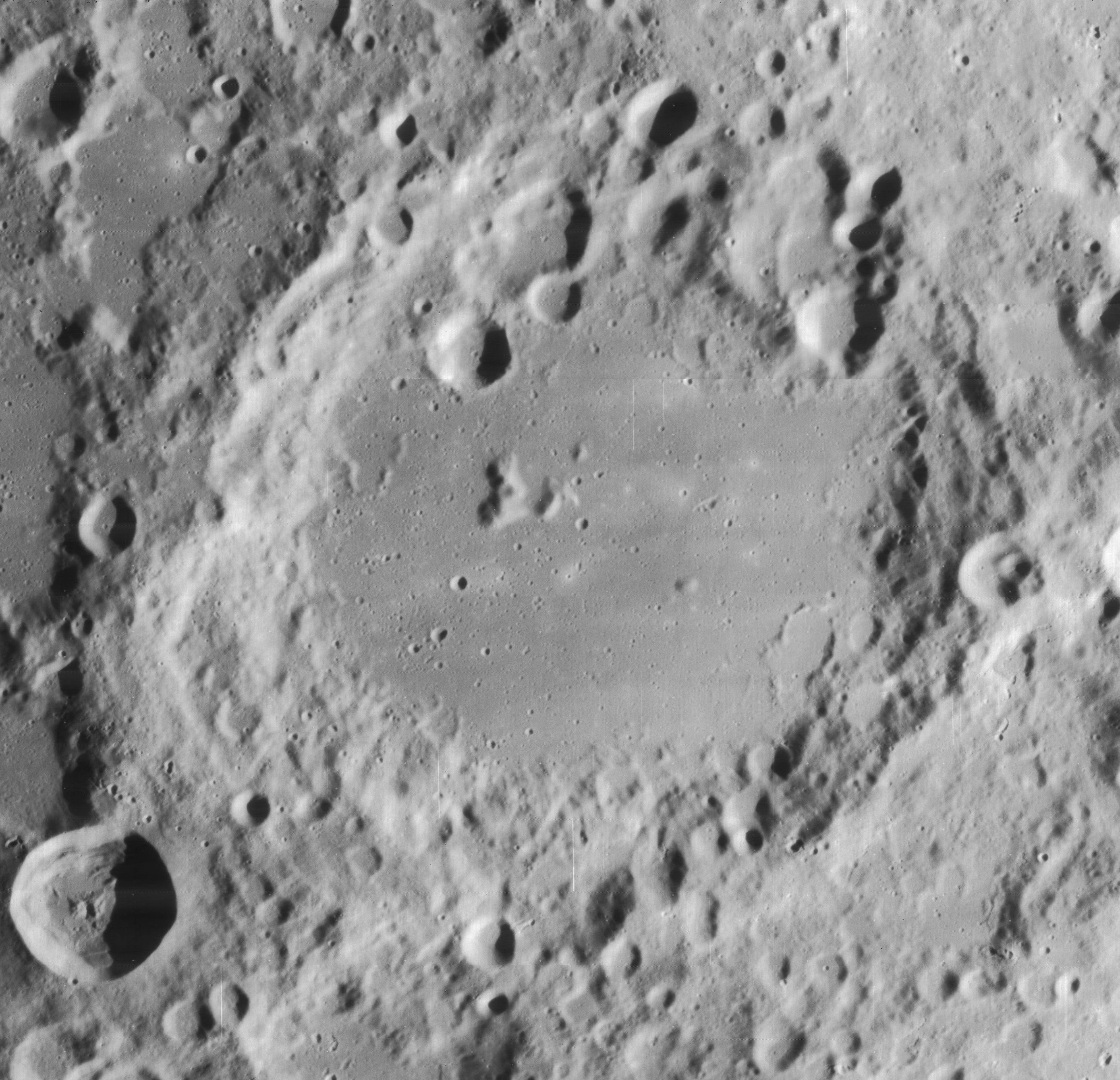
- Lunar Orbiter 4 image
- Coordinates: 49.5°S 21.7°W
- Diameter: 145 km
- Depth: 4.5 km
- Colongitude: 22° at sunrise
- Formation: Nectarian
- Eponym: C. S. Longomontanus

Longomontanus is an ancient lunar impact crater located in the rugged southern highlands to the southwest of the bright ray crater Tycho. T. W. Webb described it as a "great ring", "very deep". Longomontanus is of the variety of large lunar formations called a "walled plain", although it is actually more of a circular depression in the surface.

Because of its location, Longomontanus appears distinctly oval in shape due to foreshortening. To the southeast of Longomontanus is the even larger formation Clavius, and to the east is Maginus. North of the rim is the irregular crater Montanari, which in turn is joined at its northern rim by Wilhelm.

On the lunar geologic timescale, Longomontanus is one of the largest craters of Nectarian age. The wall of Longomontanus is heavily worn and incised by past impacts, and the rim is essentially level with the surrounding terrain. The northern rim especially is impacted with multiple overlapping craterlets. To the east of the rim is a semi-circular ridge that has the appearance of an overlapped crater rim. The crater floor of Longomontanus is relatively flat, with a low cluster of central peaks somewhat offset to the west.

== Satellite craters ==
By convention these features are identified on lunar maps by placing the letter on the side of the crater midpoint that is closest to Longomontanus.

Longomontanus	Latitude	Longitude	Diameter
A	52.8° S	24.0° W	29 km
B	52.9° S	20.7° W	48 km
C	53.4° S	19.0° W	31 km
D	54.3° S	22.9° W	29 km
E	51.4° S	18.0° W	8 km
F	48.2° S	23.5° W	19 km
G	48.7° S	18.5° W	15 km
H	52.0° S	23.2° W	7 km
K	47.9° S	20.9° W	15 km
L	49.1° S	23.6° W	16 km
M	48.6° S	23.2° W	10 km
N	50.8° S	25.7° W	12 km
P	48.1° S	25.3° W	7 km
Q	52.0° S	20.5° W	11 km
R	52.4° S	26.1° W	9 km
S	47.4° S	23.3° W	12 km
T	46.8° S	22.7° W	5 km
U	52.0° S	22.0° W	7 km
V	50.7° S	18.9° W	5 km
W	47.1° S	21.3° W	10 km
X	53.0° S	17.7° W	5 km
Y	52.3° S	28.2° W	4 km
Z	50.0° S	18.7° W	95 km
