= Giovanni Carafa, Duke of Paliano =

Italian prince

Giovanni Carafa (died 5 March 1561), Duke of Paliano, was a papal nephew and minor Italian prince.

The son of Giovanni Alfonso Carafa, Count of Montorio, and Caterina Cantelma, Giovanni came to prominence along with his brothers Carlo and Antonio when their uncle, Cardinal Giovanni Pietro Carafa, was elected Pope Paul IV in May 1555. Carlo became the most powerful of the three as the Pope's Cardinal-nephew, while Giovanni was put in command of the papal armies as Captain General of the Church. He was made Duke of Paliano after papal forces drove the pro-Spanish Colonna from that town in 1556. After the Spanish recovered Paliano in 1558, Carlo unsuccessfully sued on Giovanni's behalf to King Philip II of Spain for the Duchy of Bari.

The Carafa nephews were notorious for their corrupt and venal lifestyles. In one colourful incident, recorded by Venetian diplomats, the Duke was sent by his uncle to intercept two courtesans who had fled Rome in December 1558. Giovanni made it known that he had no personal interest in this mission: the women were favourites of his brothers, not him.

After the failure of the Pope's war with Spain in 1558, their notoriety became a liability, and they were banished from Rome on 27 January 1559. Paul IV died in August of that year, and Giovanni and Carlo were put on trial by the new Pope, Pius IV, in July 1560. The trial's proceedings were concluded in March 1561 when, under sealed orders of the Pope, the brothers were executed in Rome. Carlo, as a cardinal, was strangled in the Castel San Angelo, while, two days later, Giovanni was beheaded at the Tor di Nona prison along with two companions. The sentence was overturned under the next pope, Pius V, in 1567, after a petition by their surviving brother, and their prosecutor was executed for having deceived Pius IV.

The Duke was married to Violante Díaz-Garlón, an aristocrat of Spanish descent. He had her murdered on 28 August 1559 on suspicion of infidelity. On the 31st of August 1559 Challoner wrote to William Cecil, Secretary to Queen Elizabeth I, that 'The Duke of Pagliano, lately finding his wife in adultery, slew and quartered the adulterer; deferring the punishment of his wife (named very fair) until she be delivered of child.' The affair is retold in Stendhal's novella, The Duchess of Palliano. The murder of his wife was one of the charges brought against the Duke at his trial, as well as crimes against supporters of the Colonna.

His son, along with a cousin, was held hostage at the court of King Henry II of France as surety in diplomatic negotiations with Paul IV.

== Sources ==
- James M. Boyden, The Courtier and the King: Ruy Gómez De Silva, Philip II, and the Court of Spain. (Berkeley: University of California Press, 1995)
- The Cardinals of the Holy Roman Church: Carafa, Carlo
- Elizabeth Carman, “Diplomacy Through the Grapevine: Time, Distance, and Sixteenth-Century Ambassadorial Dispatches”
- “Pius IV”, The New Schaff-Herzog Encyclopedia of Religious Knowledge (1914), Vol. IX.
- John Addington Symonds, Renaissance in Italy: the Catholic Reaction. (New York: Henry Holt & Co, 1887).
