= Giovan Battista Pacichelli =

Italian abbot, scholar and traveller

Giovan Battista Pacichelli FRS
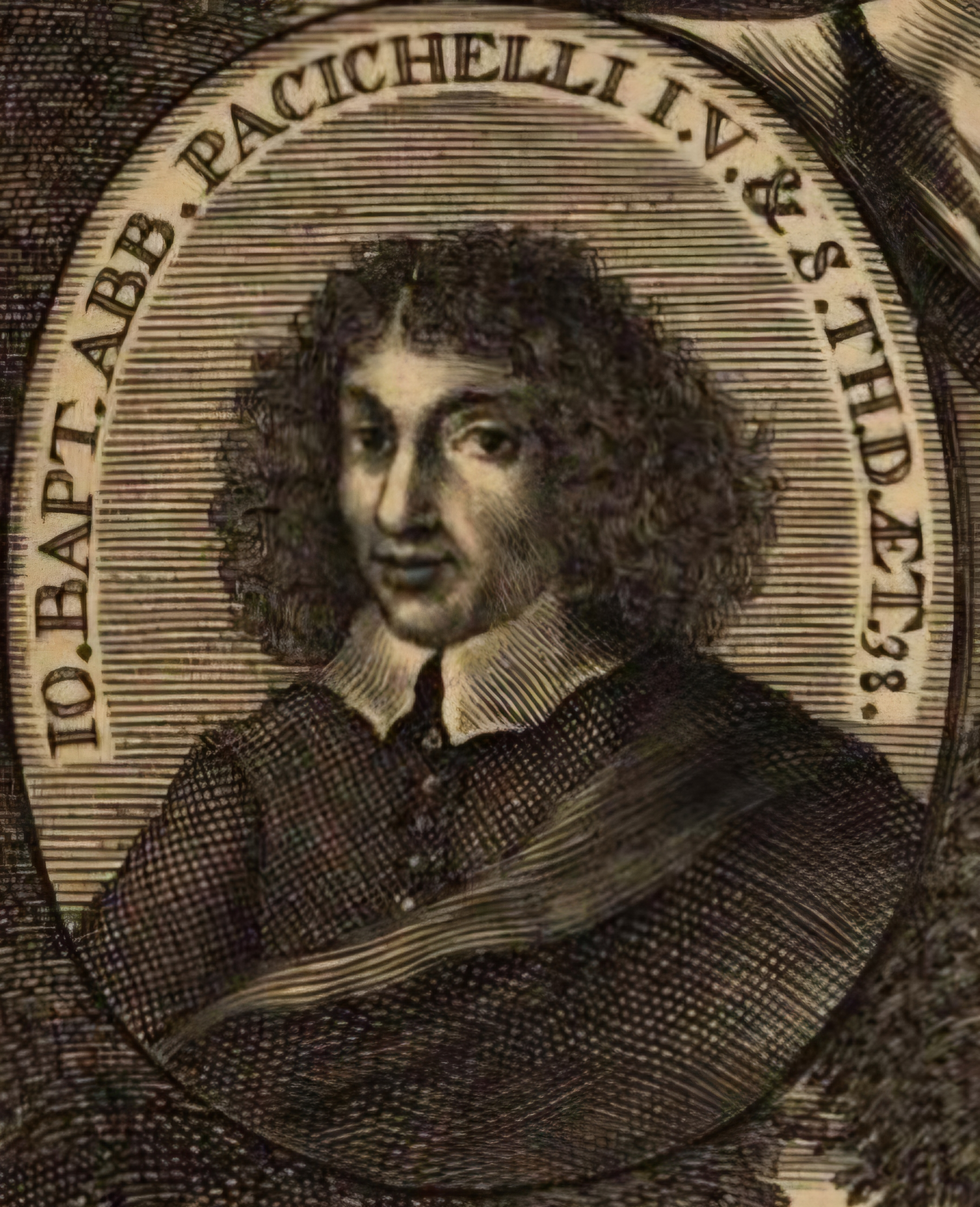
- Engraved portrait of Giovan Battista Pacichelli
- Born: 1641; Rome, Papal States
- Died: 1695 (aged 53–54); Rome, Papal States
- Occupations: Abbot; Historian; Philologist; Jurist; Diplomat
- Known for: Il Regno di Napoli in Prospettiva

Academic background
- Education: University of Pisa; Sapienza University of Rome

Giovanni Battista Pacichelli FRS (1641 – 1695) was an Italian abbot, scholar and traveller.

== Biography ==
Giovanni Battista Pacichelli was born in Rome in 1641 to a family originary from Pistoia. He studied law at the University of Pisa and theology at the Sapienza University of Rome. He soon made himself known as an antiquarian and philologist. In 1668 he published his first work, Il Giosia del Vaticano, dedicated to Pope Clement IX.

His talents won him protectors and he was attached to the Legation of the Holy See in Germany. This appointment enabled him to visit the principal countries of Europe. In July 1673 he visited the Southern Netherlands and the Dutch Republic. In March 1674 he returned to Germany, but in May he left again for Rotterdam, The Hague and Amsterdam. He spent some time in Amsterdam, where he visited the collections of Witsen, Grill, Occo and van der Hem. He also visited the bookshops of Blaeu, Elsevier and Janssonius. Back in Germany, he visited Bremen, Hamburg and Lübeck. In June he moved to Bruges and then to France, where he visited Paris, Champagne and Artois. Back in Germany, he travelled through Westphalia and Saxony. In the autumn of 1674 he visited Colmar and Mainz. In the spring of 1675 he visited England, Scotland and Ireland; then he sailed from Dover for Lisbon and visited Portugal and Spain. After a brief stay in Cologne, in 1676 he undertook a long journey through Sweden, Denmark, Austria, Poland and Hungary. The following year he visited Provence, the Dauphiné and Savoy. From there he returned to Italy. Pacichelli was elected Fellow of the Royal Society in 1674, having been proposed by Robert Boyle.

Later in his life he was made ambassador of Ranuccio II of Parma in Naples, where he settled in 1679. He remained in Naples for about 15 years, where he mainly attended to his studies and where he published almost all of his works. In 1684 he visited the Kingdom of Sicily. He died in Rome in 1695.

== Works ==
Pacichelli left a number of written works. His masterpiece, Il Regno di Napoli in Prospettiva (The Kingdom of Naples in Perspective), was published posthumously in 1703. This work contains a detailed account of the Kingdom of Naples. It was published in three volumes (one volume for each of the three-part work) and totals approximately 800 pages. Pacichelli was a friend and correspondent of many of the foremost scholars of the day, including Angelico Aprosio, Nicolas Steno, René-François de Sluse and Nicolaas Heinsius. He left a detailed account of his travels in his Memorie de' viaggi per l'Europa cristiana published in five duodecimo volumes in 1685, with two further volumes, Memorie novelle de' Viaggi, in 1691.

== List of works ==
- Schediasma de iis qui nullo modo possunt in jus vocari. Rome. 1669.
- Vita del reuerendissimo padre Gio. Battista de' Marini, con un indice degli scrittori domenicani. Rome: per Nicol'Angeli Tinassi. 1670.
- Tractatus iuridicus de distantiis. Rome: typis, & expensis Ignatij De Lazaris. 1672.
- Chiroliturgia, sive de varia ac multiplici manus administratione lucubrationes. Cologne: typis Wilhelmi Friessem. 1673.
- Diatriba de pede. Cologne. 1675.
- De jure hospitalitatis. Cologne: typis Wilhelmi Friessem. 1673.
- Memorie de' viaggi per l'Europa cristiana. Naples: Giacomo Raillard. 1685.
- Schediasma juridico-philologicum tripartitum de larvis, de capillamentis et de chirothecis. Naples: ex officina Camilli Cavalli. 1693.
- De tintinnabulo Nolano lucubratio. Naples: ex officina Camilli Cavalli. 1693.
- Lettere familiari, istoriche et erudite. Naples: appresso li socii Parrino e Mutii. 1695.
- Il Regno di Napoli in prospettiva diviso in dodeci provincie. Naples: nella stamperia di Dom. Ant. Parrino. 1703.

== Bibliography ==
- Tiraboschi, Girolamo (1793). Storia della letteratura italiana. Vol. VIII, 1. Modena. p. 98.
- Carrino, Annastella (2014). "PACICHELLI, Giovanni Battista". Dizionario Biografico degli Italiani (in Italian). Vol. 80: Ottone–Pansa. Rome: Istituto dell'Enciclopedia Italiana. ISBN 978-88-12-00032-6.
- Scibilia, Federica (2014). "Le città costiere di Sicilia e le loro architetture nella "memoria" di viaggio di Giovan Battista Pacichelli (1685)". Visibile Invisibile: Percepire la città tra descrizioni e omissioni. Catania: Scrimm Edizioni: 776–788.
