= Giulio Cesare la Galla =

- Born: 1571; Padula, Kingdom of Naples
- Died: 14 February 1624 (aged 52–53); Rome, Papal States
- Occupations: Philosopher; Physician
- Parent(s): Roberto la Galla and Vittoria la Galla (née Rosa)

Academic background
- Education: University of Naples Federico II; Sapienza University of Rome

Academic work
- Era: Renaissance
- Discipline: Natural philosophy
- School or tradition: Aristotelianism
- Institutions: Sapienza University of Rome

Giulio Cesare la Galla (or Julius Cæsar Lagalla or Giulio Cesare Lagalla) (1571–1624) was a professor of philosophy at the Collegio Romano in Italy.

== Biography ==
He was born in Padula, at that time part of the Kingdom of Naples. Lagalla was educated in philosophy and medicine. He became the official physician of the papal galleys for a period, then came to Rome to lecture in natural philosophy at the Collegio Romano. He apparently became the leading peripatetic of the city, and was counted among the opponents of the Copernican heliocentric theory.

Following Galileo’s observations of the Moon by means of a telescope, published in Sidereus Nuncius, Lagalla published a booklet in response. He participated in the demonstrations of the instrument by Galileo and was not among those who doubted the ability of the instrument. But he did debate Galileo's three-dimensional representation of the Moon based on two-dimensional visual observations.

In his book De Phenomenis in Orbe Lunae (published in Venice in 1612), he claimed that the untreated stone (known as "lapis solaris" and shown to him by Galileo Galilei) was unable to give off light only after calcination. We now know that the "Bolognian Stone" was a piece of barite (barium sulphate).

The crater Lagalla on the Moon is named after him.

== Bibliography ==
- De luce et lumine altera disputatio. Venice: apud Thomam Balionum. 1612.
- De phoenomenis in orbe lunae novi telescopii usu a d. Gallileo Gallileo nunc iterum suscitatis (in Latin). Venice: Tommaso Baglioni. 1612.
- De Immortalitate animorum ex Aristot. sententia (1621)
