= Ernest William Brown =

English-American astronomer and mathematician (1866–1938)

- Ernest William Brown, from the American Mathematical Society
- Born: 29 November 1866; Hull, England
- Died: 22 July 1938 (aged 71); New Haven, Connecticut
- Citizenship: United Kingdom; United States
- Education: Christ's College, Cambridge
- Known for: Lunar theory Celestial mechanics
- Awards: Royal Medal (1914); James Craig Watson Medal (1937); Fellow of the Royal Society (1897)
- Scientific career
- Fields: Mathematics; Astronomy
- Doctoral advisor: George Howard Darwin

Ernest William Brown FRS (29 November 1866 – 22 July 1938) was an English mathematician and astronomer, who spent the majority of his career working in the United States and became a naturalised American citizen in 1923.

His life's work was the study of the Moon's motion (lunar theory) and the compilation of extremely accurate lunar tables. He also studied the motion of the planets and calculated the orbits of Trojan asteroids.

== Life and career ==
Brown was born in Hull, England, the second of four children of William and Emma Brown (née Martin). His father was originally a farmer and later became a timber merchant. His mother and younger brother died of scarlet fever in 1870, when Brown was not quite 4 years old. He and his two sisters were then looked after by a maiden aunt, until his father remarried five years later.

=== Education and early career ===
Brown was educated at Totteridge Park School, Hertfordshire (now part of Dorset House School) and Hull and East Riding College. After leaving school, he entered Christ's College, Cambridge, where he graduated with first-class honours as sixth Wrangler in mathematics in 1887. He continued with post-graduate studies at Cambridge and worked under the direction of George Howard Darwin. In the summer of 1888, Darwin suggested that he study the papers of George William Hill on the lunar theory. As it turned out, this idea for a line of research was to have a major impact on the remainder of Brown's life.

Brown was made a fellow of Christ's College in 1889 and was elected as a Fellow of the Royal Astronomical Society in the same year. He received his master's degree in 1891 and then left Cambridge to take up a place as a mathematics instructor at Haverford College, Pennsylvania. There, he rose rapidly to the position of Professor of Mathematics in 1893. However, he continued most years to return to Cambridge during the summer, often staying with his old tutor, Darwin.

=== Work on the motion of the Moon ===
At Haverford, Brown continued with his studies of the lunar theory, and made a thorough review of the work of earlier researchers, such as Hill, de Pontécoulant, Delaunay and Hansen. His mastery of the field was shown by the publication of his first great work, An Introductory Treatise on the Lunar Theory, in 1896, when Brown was still less than 30 years of age. The following year, he was elected as a Fellow of the Royal Society.

As Brown's work progressed, he gradually evolved a plan to create a completely new lunar theory. This was eventually published as a series of papers in the Memoirs of the Royal Astronomical Society between 1897 and 1908. In 1907, he was appointed Professor of Mathematics at Yale University, with which he secured an agreement for funding the massive task of calculating detailed tables of the Moon's motion, based on his lunar theory. After a period of 12 years and a cost of over $34,000, Brown's magnum opus, Tables of the Motion of the Moon, was published in 1919.

=== Discrepancies between theory and observation ===
Brown's objective had been to produce an accurate ephemeris of the Moon, based purely on gravitational theory. For the 'main problem' of the Earth-Moon-Sun system, he calculated terms in longitude and latitude down to an uncertainty of 0.001 arcseconds. He also included perturbations due to the other planets (principally Jupiter and Venus) and also accounted for the more difficult problem of the non-spherical nature of the Earth and Moon.

Observations showed that Brown's tables were indeed superior to those of Hansen, which had been in use since 1857, but there was still a large unexplained fluctuation in the Moon's mean longitude of the order of 10 arcseconds. A 'great empirical term', of magnitude 10.71 arcseconds and period 257 years, was introduced to eliminate this as far as possible. Given the precision of Brown's calculations, it must have come as a great disappointment to have to introduce this arbitrary adjustment.

It had been discovered by Edmond Halley over two centuries previously that the Moon's motion appeared to be gradually speeding up. This 'secular acceleration' could not be explained by gravitational theory alone, and it had been suggested by Simon Newcomb that it was in fact due to a gradual deceleration of the Earth's rate of rotation, due to friction generated by the tides. The implication of this was that it was not the Moon that was speeding up – it was time (as measured in terms of Earth's increasingly long day) that appeared to be slowing down.

Brown devoted much study to this problem and proposed it should be attacked observationally, using lunar occultations to map the Moon's path more precisely. He also reasoned that, if the discrepancies were caused by variations in the Earth's rotation, it implied that observations of other objects would be similarly affected. This was partially verified by observations of transits of Mercury, but Brown was initially not convinced. However, he eventually concluded that Newcomb was right, and not only was the Earth's rate of rotation slowing, but also there were random, unpredictable fluctuations, and he published these findings in a paper in 1926. Later work has shown this to be true, and astronomers now make a distinction between Universal Time, which is based on the Earth's rotation, and Terrestrial Time (formerly Ephemeris time), which is a uniform measure of the passage of time (see also ΔT).

=== Later work and collaborations ===
Brown was an active member of the American Mathematical Society and served as its president from 1915 to 1916.

He retained his professorship at Yale until he retired in 1932. As well as continuing his work on the Moon, he also worked on the motion of the planets around the Sun. In 1933, he published the book, Planetary Theory, co-authored with Clarence Shook, which contained a detailed exposition of resonance in planetary orbits and examined the special case of the Trojan asteroids. In 1937, he was awarded the Watson Medal by the US National Academy of Sciences.

One of Brown's post-graduate pupils was Wallace John Eckert, who became an instructor at Columbia University while finishing his doctorate. Eckert would improve the pace of astronomical calculations by automating them with digital computers.

=== Private life ===
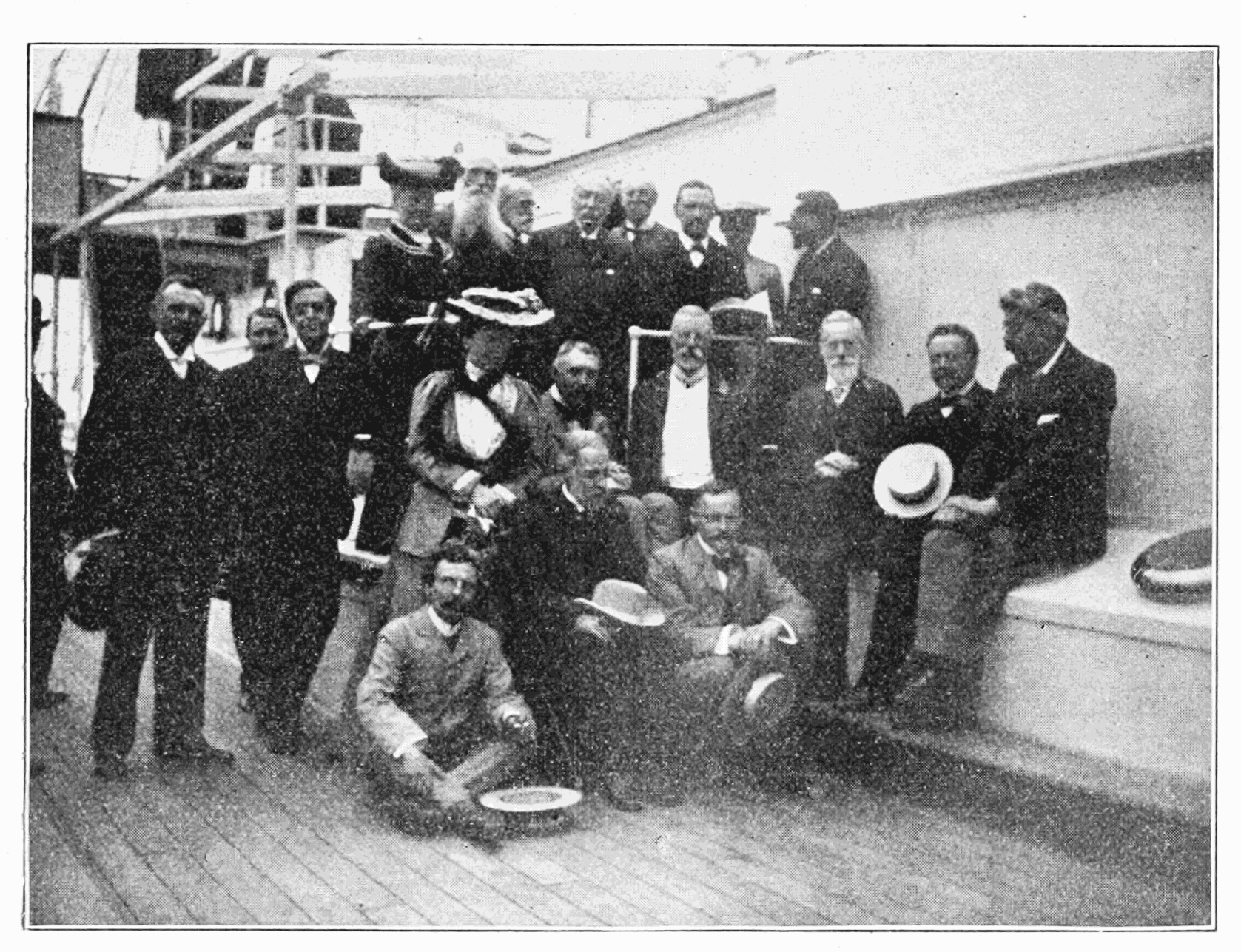
British Association members on the voyage to South Africa, 1905. Brown is seated at bottom right.

Brown never married, and for most of his adult life lived with his unmarried younger sister, Mildred, who kept house for him. She made it her job to shield him from "cares and disturbances" and succeeded in "utterly spoiling him." In his youth, he was a keen rower and mountaineer. He was a capable pianist and continued to play until a few years before his death. He remained fond of music and was for a time the head of the New Haven Oratorio Society. Brown also played chess to a high standard and loved detective stories.

He enjoyed travelling and frequently crossed the Atlantic between the United States and Great Britain. With several professional colleagues, he was also an enthusiastic participant in the British Association's extended visit to South Africa and other parts of southern and eastern Africa between July and October 1905.

His daily routine was unusual, and was described as follows:

He was in the habit of going to bed early and as a consequence woke up between three and five o'clock in the morning. After having fortified himself with strong coffee from a thermos bottle he set to work without leaving his bed, smoking numerous cigarettes. His serious scientific work was thus done before he got up for breakfast at nine o'clock.

=== Death ===
A heavy smoker, Brown suffered from bronchial trouble for much of his life. He was afflicted by ill-health during most of the six years of his retirement, and died in New Haven, Connecticut in 1938. His sister, Mildred, had died a few years before him and his only surviving close family was his widowed older sister, Ella Yorke, who had emigrated with her husband to New Zealand in the 1890s.

== Legacy ==
Brown's Tables were adopted by nearly all of the national ephemerides in 1923 for their calculations of the Moon's position, and continued to be used with some modification until 1983. With the advent of digital computers, Brown's original trigonometrical expressions, given in the introduction to his 1919 tables (and from which the tables had been compiled), began to be used for direct computation instead of the tables themselves. This also gained some improvement in precision, since the tables had embodied some minor approximations, in a trade-off between accuracy and the amount of labour needed for computations in those days of manual calculation.

By the middle of the 20th century, the difference between Universal and Ephemeris Time had been recognised and evaluated, and the troublesome empirical terms were removed. Further adjustments to Brown's theory were then made, arising from improved observational values of the fundamental astronomical constants used in the theory, and from re-working Brown's original analytical expansions to gain more precise versions of the coefficients used in the theory.

Eventually, in 1984, Brown's work was replaced by results gained from more modern observational data (including data from lunar laser ranging) and altogether new computational methods for calculating the Moon's ephemeris.

== Honours ==
=== Awards ===
- Adams Prize (1907)
- Gold Medal of the Royal Astronomical Society (1907)
- Bruce Medal (1920)
- James Craig Watson Medal (1936)

=== Named after him ===
- The crater Brown on the Moon
- Asteroid 1643 Brown
- Brown lunation number

== Bibliography ==
- Brown, E.W. An Introductory Treatise on the Lunar Theory Cambridge University Press, 1896 (republished by Dover, 1960).
- Brown, E.W. Tables of the Motion of the Moon Yale University Press, New Haven CT, 1919, Sections I–II, III, IV–VI (3 volumes)
- Brown, E.W. and Shook, C.A. Planetary Theory. Cambridge University Press, 1933 (republished by Dover, 1964).
