= Lagalla (crater) =

Crater on the Moon

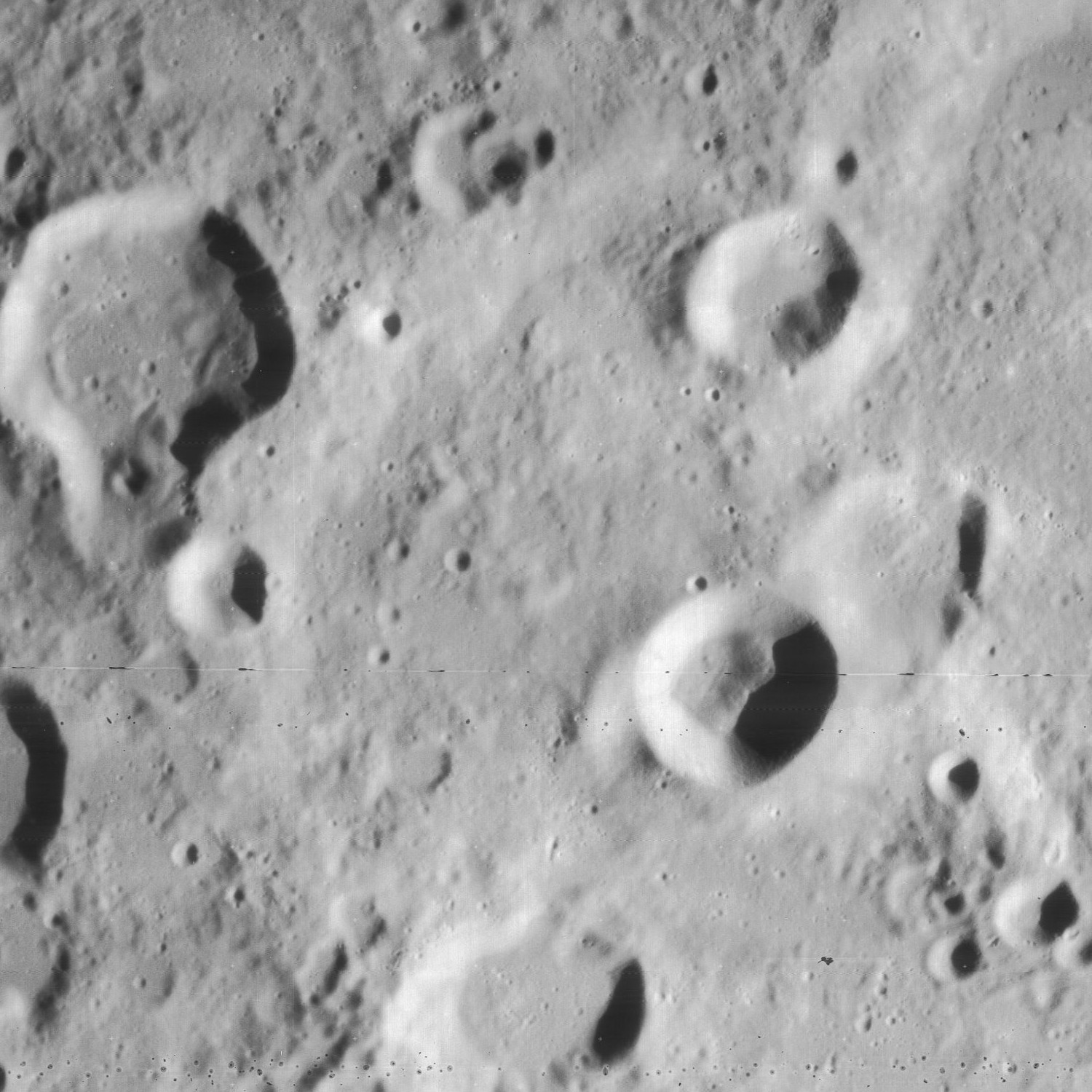
- Lunar Orbiter 4 image
- Coordinates: 44.6°S 22.5°W
- Diameter: 85 km
- Depth: 1.3 km
- Colongitude: 23° at sunrise
- Eponym: Giulio C. Lagalla

Lagalla is the remnant of a lunar impact crater. Wilhelm partly overlies the northeastern rim, and Montanari is attached to the southeast. The remainder of the rim is heavily eroded, with small craters overlaying sections along most of the sides. The rim is nearly nonexistent to the south, and the most intact portion is along the northwest. Lagalla F, an irregular satellite crater, is attached to the western rim. The interior floor is uneven and relatively featureless.

== Satellite craters ==
By convention these features are identified on lunar maps by placing the letter on the side of the crater midpoint that is closest to Lagalla.

Lagalla	Latitude	Longitude	Diameter
F	44.6° S	25.3° W	29 km
H	44.4° S	27.0° W	5 km
J	46.0° S	25.1° W	22 km
K	43.7° S	24.3° W	10 km
M	46.6° S	25.7° W	6 km
N	44.9° S	26.1° W	12 km
P	45.2° S	24.4° W	11 km
T	47.3° S	26.5° W	7 km
V	47.0° S	24.3° W	5 km
