= Gottfried Heinsius =

German mathematician, geographer and astronomer

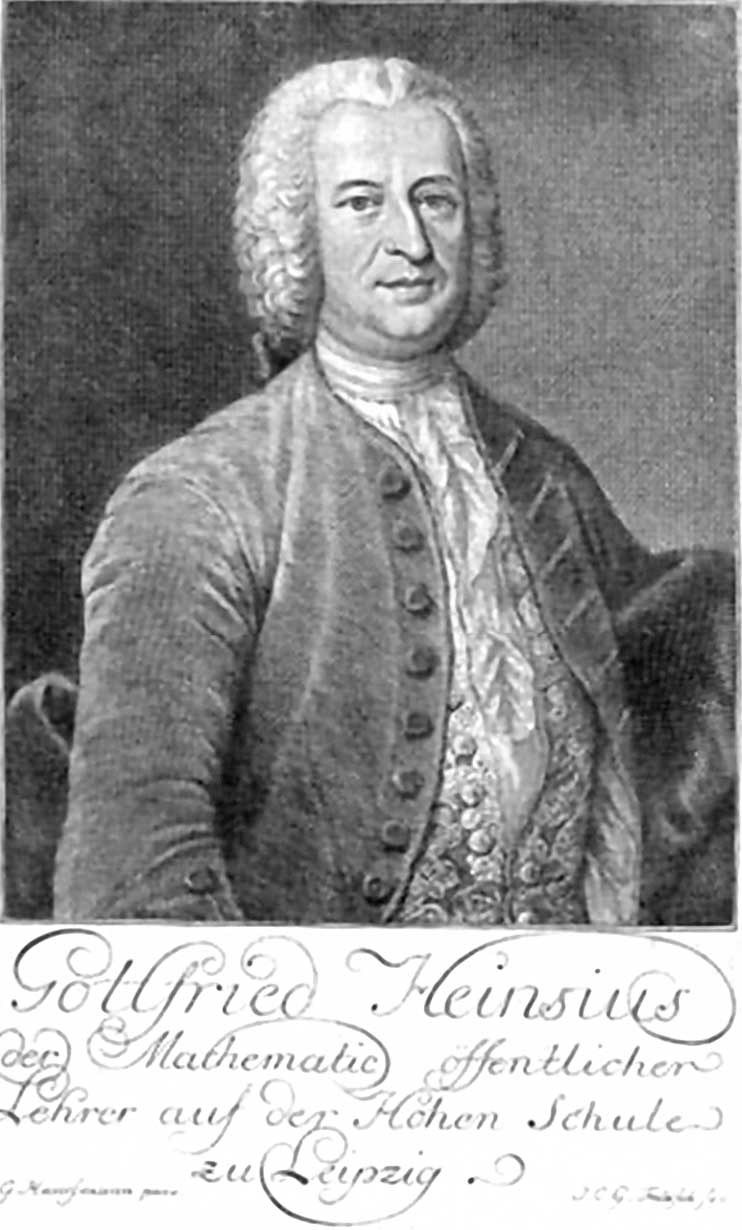
Gottfried Heinsius, engraving, 1754

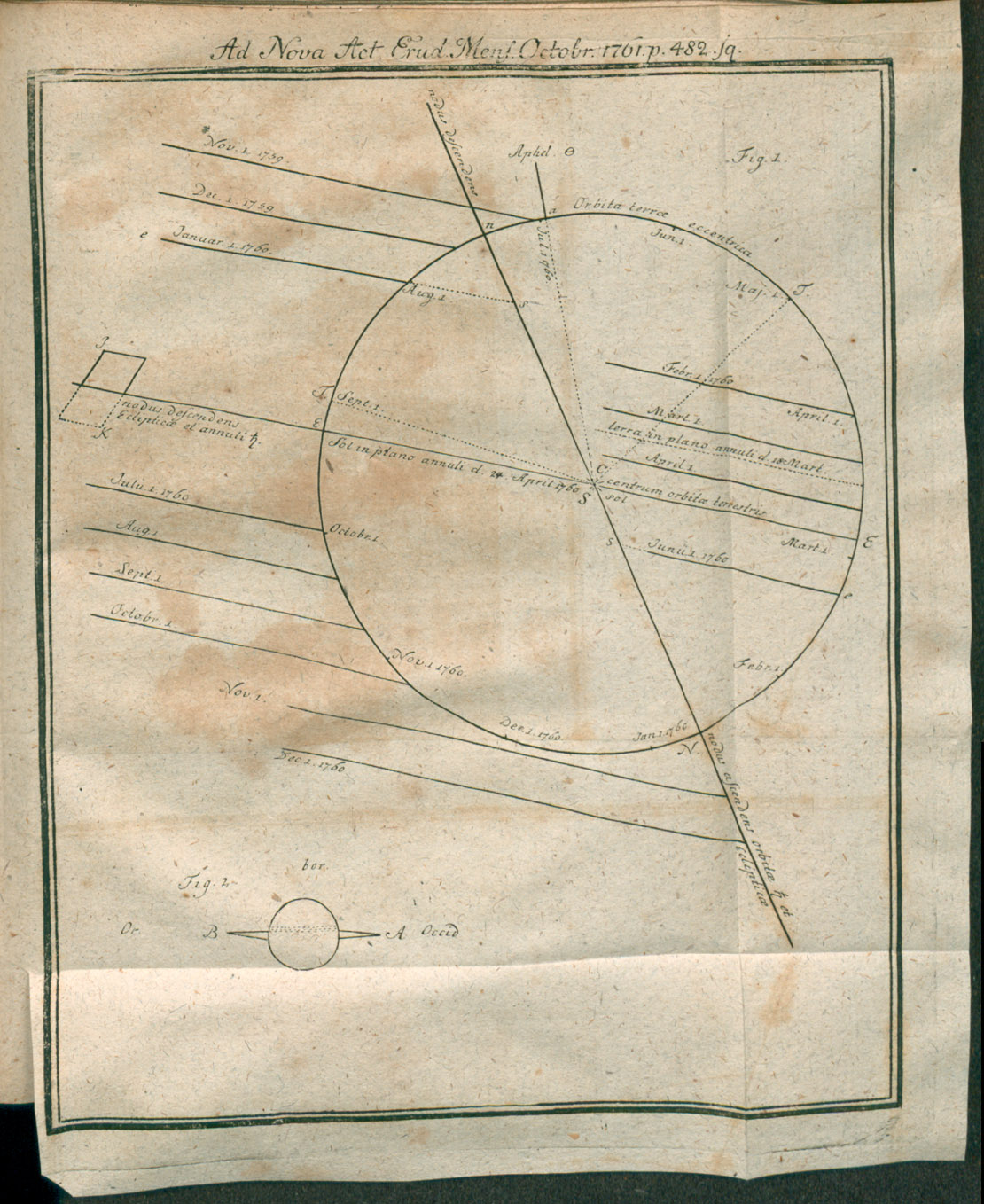
Illustration about Observationes circa phasin [!] Saturni rotundam from Acta Eruditorum, 1761

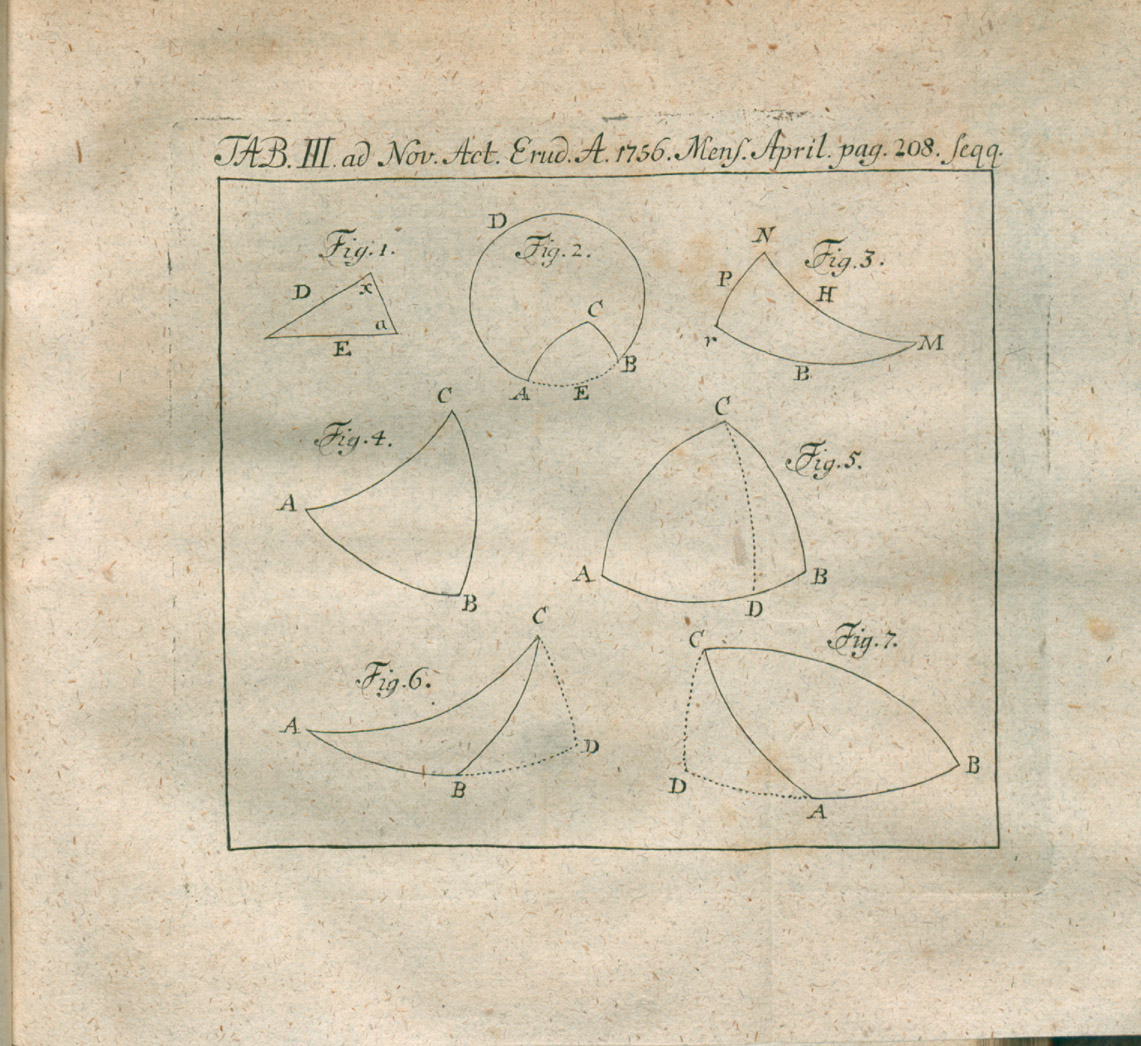
Illustration about Diiudicatio [!] casuum determinatorum... from Acta Eruditorum, 1756

Gottfried Heinsius (April, 1709 – May 21, 1769) was a German mathematician, geographer and astronomer.

He was born near Naumburg and was awarded a Ph.D. in 1733 from the University of Leipzig in the Electorate of Saxony, with a dissertation on De viribus motricibus. Later he became professor of mathematics at the same institution. Professor Heinsius may have been the first to publish an announcement about the return of Halley's Comet in 1759. From 1736–1743 he taught in St. Petersburg with Leonhard Euler and was a member of the St. Petersburg Academy of Sciences. While in Russia, he was given the task to provide the Russian Tsar Ivan VI with a horoscope. He died in Leipzig. The crater Heinsius on the Moon is named after him.
