= Montanari (crater) =

Crater on the Moon

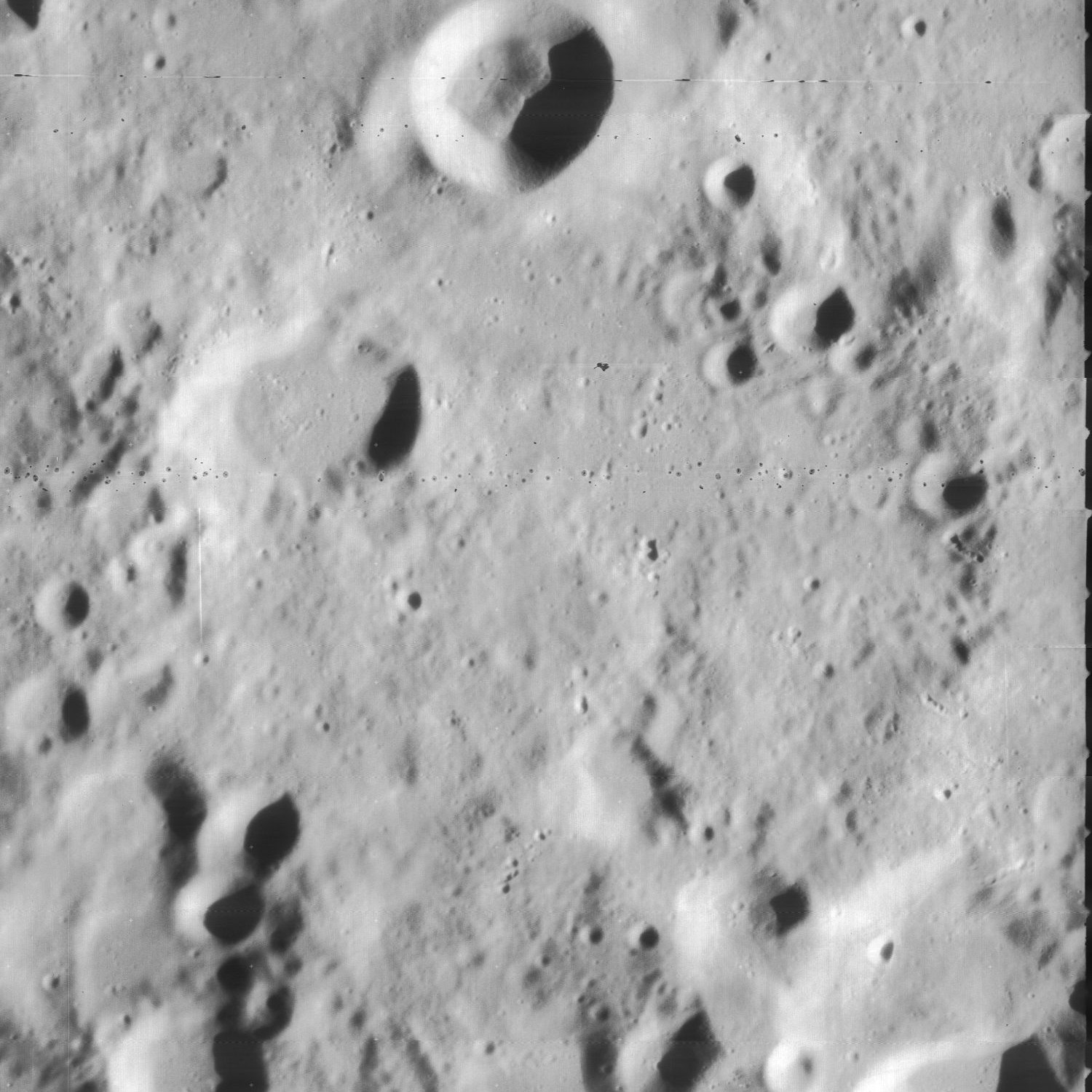
- Lunar Orbiter 4 image
- Coordinates: 45.8°S 20.6°W
- Diameter: 77 km
- Depth: 2.0 km
- Colongitude: 22° at sunrise
- Eponym: Geminiano Montanari

Montanari is a lunar impact crater. It is located to the west-southwest of the prominent ray crater Tycho, and is attached to the southern rim of the walled plain named Wilhelm. Along the northwestern side is the crater remnant Lagalla, and just to the south is the large walled plain Longomontanus.

The rim of Montanari has been so deeply eroded by impacts that it is now little more than an irregular border around the interior floor. These impacts have distorted the shape of the crater, and have nearly obliterated the southern rim. Ejecta from Longomontanus overlies part of the southern floor. The satellite crater Montanari D lies across the western rim, and covers part of the interior floor. The northern part of the floor is more regular and featureless than the south.

== Satellite craters ==
By convention these features are identified on lunar maps by placing the letter on the side of the crater midpoint that is closest to Montanari.

| Montanari | Latitude | Longitude | Diameter |
|---|---|---|---|
| D | 45.9° S | 22.1° W | 24 km |
| W | 44.8° S | 18.1° W | 7 km |
