= Heinsius (crater) =

Crater on the Moon

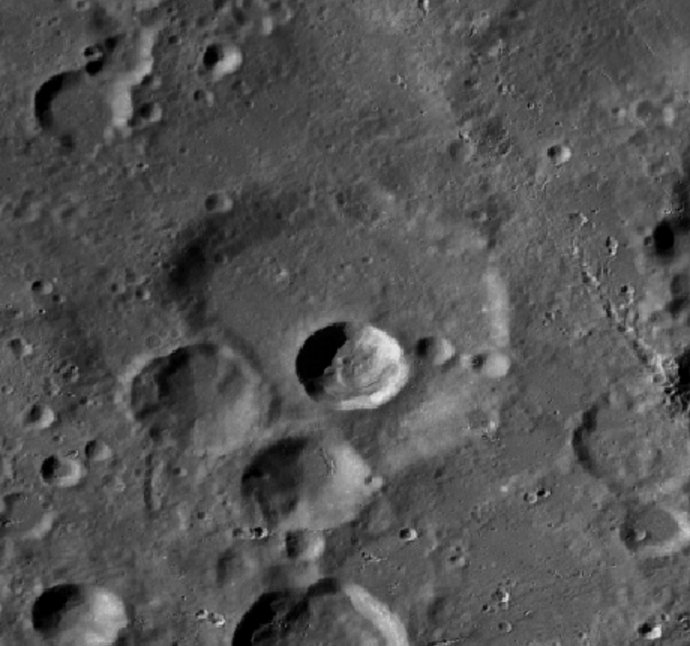
- LRO image
- Coordinates: 39.5°S 17.7°W
- Diameter: 64 km
- Depth: 2.7 km
- Colongitude: 19° at sunrise
- Eponym: Gottfried Heinsius

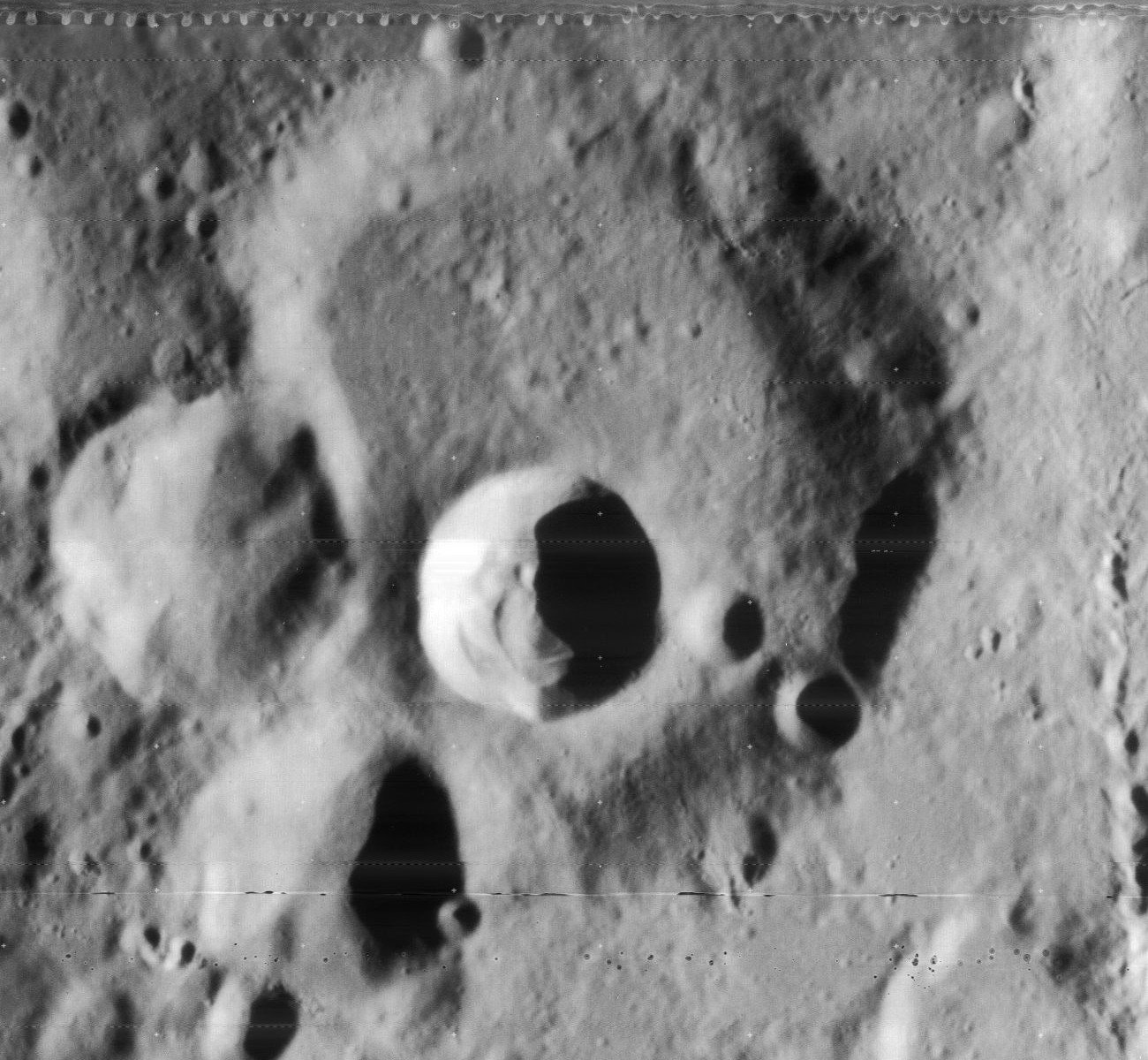
Lunar Orbiter 4 image

Heinsius is an eroded lunar impact crater that lies in the southwestern part of the Moon. It is named after German astronomer Gottfried Heinsius. It is located to the northwest of the prominent crater Tycho, and rays from that formation pass to the north and south of Heinsius as well as marking the rim and interior with material. To the south-southwest of Heinsius is the larger walled plain called Wilhelm.

The southern part of this crater has been heavily damaged by subsequent impacts. Both Heinsius B and Heinsius C lie across the southern and southwestern rim, while Heinsius A is located in the southern interior floor. Together these three satellite craters form a triangular arrangement with the rims only separated by a few kilometers from each other. If Heinsius possessed a central peak, it is now covered by the outer rampart of Heinsius A.

The northern half of the rim is in better shape, although still worn and rounded due to impact erosion. There is a wide shelf along the northeastern inner wall. A small craterlet lies exactly on the northwestern rim. The northern interior floor is relatively level and featureless.

== Satellite craters ==
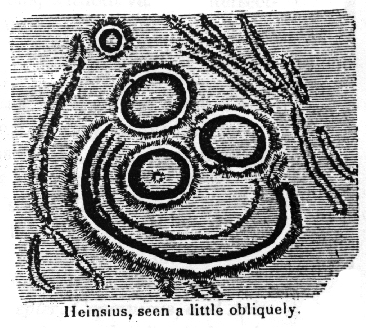
Sketch of Heinsius by James Dwight Dana.

By convention these features are identified on lunar maps by placing the letter on the side of the crater midpoint that is closest to Heinsius.

Heinsius	Latitude	Longitude	Diameter
A	39.7° S	17.6° W	20 km
B	40.0° S	18.6° W	23 km
C	40.6° S	17.9° W	23 km
D	38.8° S	20.7° W	7 km
E	37.8° S	19.5° W	17 km
F	40.5° S	19.7° W	7 km
G	38.3° S	14.5° W	11 km
H	37.4° S	18.5° W	8 km
J	39.3° S	20.4° W	8 km
K	38.5° S	18.5° W	5 km
L	41.2° S	18.4° W	8 km
M	40.9° S	15.3° W	14 km
N	37.3° S	14.7° W	7 km
O	38.8° S	14.8° W	5 km
P	39.4° S	13.8° W	40 km
Q	39.9° S	14.5° W	35 km
R	40.2° S	20.7° W	5 km
S	39.6° S	16.9° W	7 km
T	39.7° S	16.5° W	7 km
