= Nicolaas Heinsius the Younger =

Dutch physician (1656–1718)

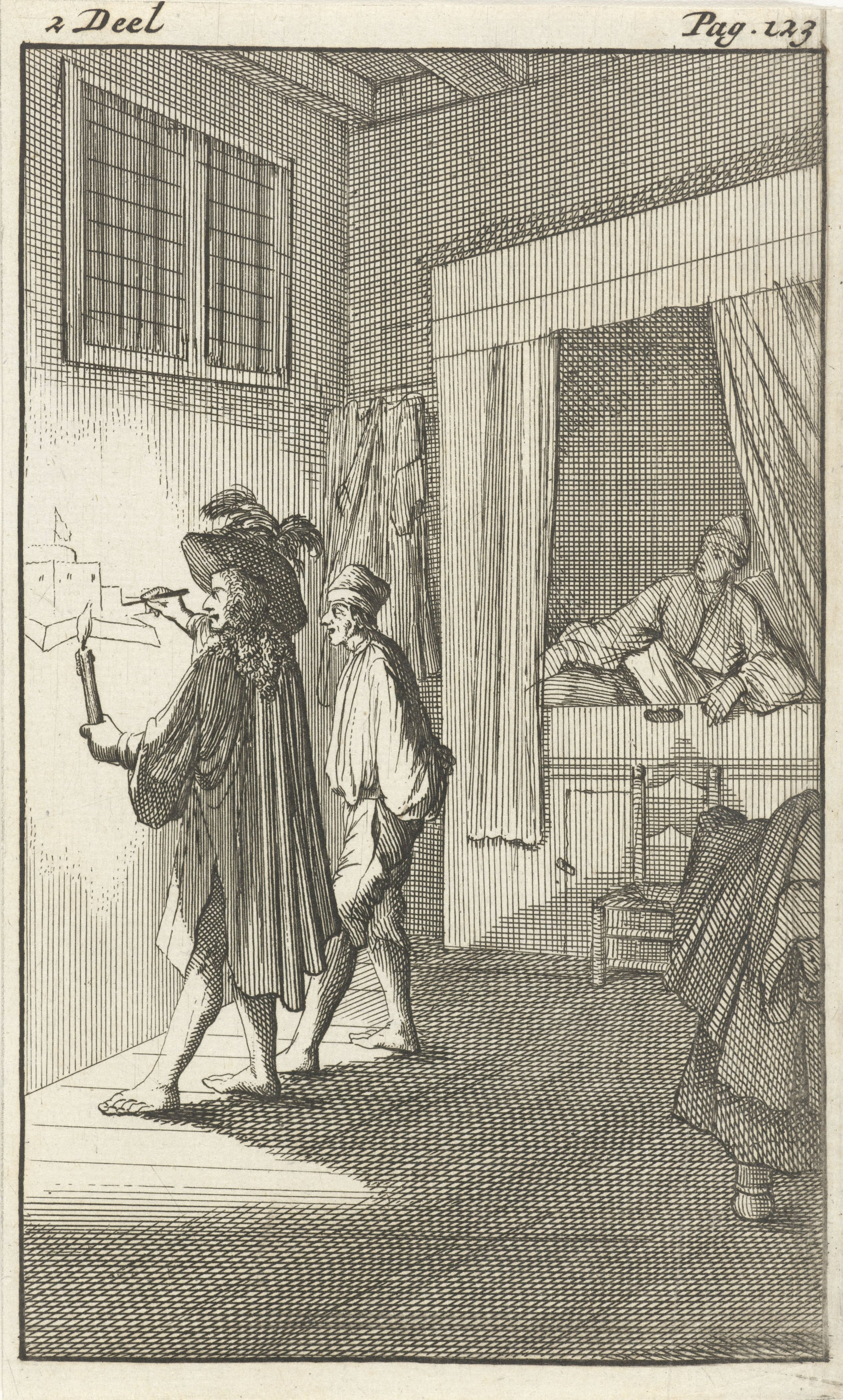
Illustration from the Wonderful Life of Mirandor

Nicolaas Heinsius the Younger (1656, in The Hague – buried 12 January 1718, in Culemborg) was a Dutch physician and writer.

== Life ==
Heinsius was an illegitimate son of Nicolaas Heinsius the Elder and his long term Swedish-born partner, Margaretha Wullen. With little help of his father, he became a medical doctor at the age of 20, but had to flee the country in 1677 after he and several drunk friends had committed manslaughter in the streets of The Hague. Traveling as a physician through France, Italy and Germany, he arrived in Rome in 1679, where he became personal physician of Christina of Sweden until about 1687. Later he became personal physician of the elector of Brandenburg in Kleve.

In 1695 he returned to the Netherlands, settling in Culemborg, at the time a free city and exempt from the Dutch ban imposed on him. That same year he published Den vermakelyken avanturier, ofte De Wispelturige, en niet min Wonderlyke Levens-Loop van Mirandor (The Jolly Adventurer or the Unpredictable and not less Wonderful Life of Mirandor) (1695). This was the only Dutch-language romance novel of the 17th century. It contained much autobiographical material and was the first picaresque "schelmenroman" in Dutch. It had been reprinted 10 times by 1756, and was translated into German, English, French and Italian. He further wrote five works on medicine, which were published in Cleves, and one other novel, Don Clarazel de Contarnos (1697). An official request in 1707 to the States-General of the Netherlands to lift his ban apparently was refused.

== Sources ==
- Nicolaas Heinsius Jr. at www.schrijversinfo.nl (Dutch)
