= Wilhelm (crater) =

Crater on the Moon

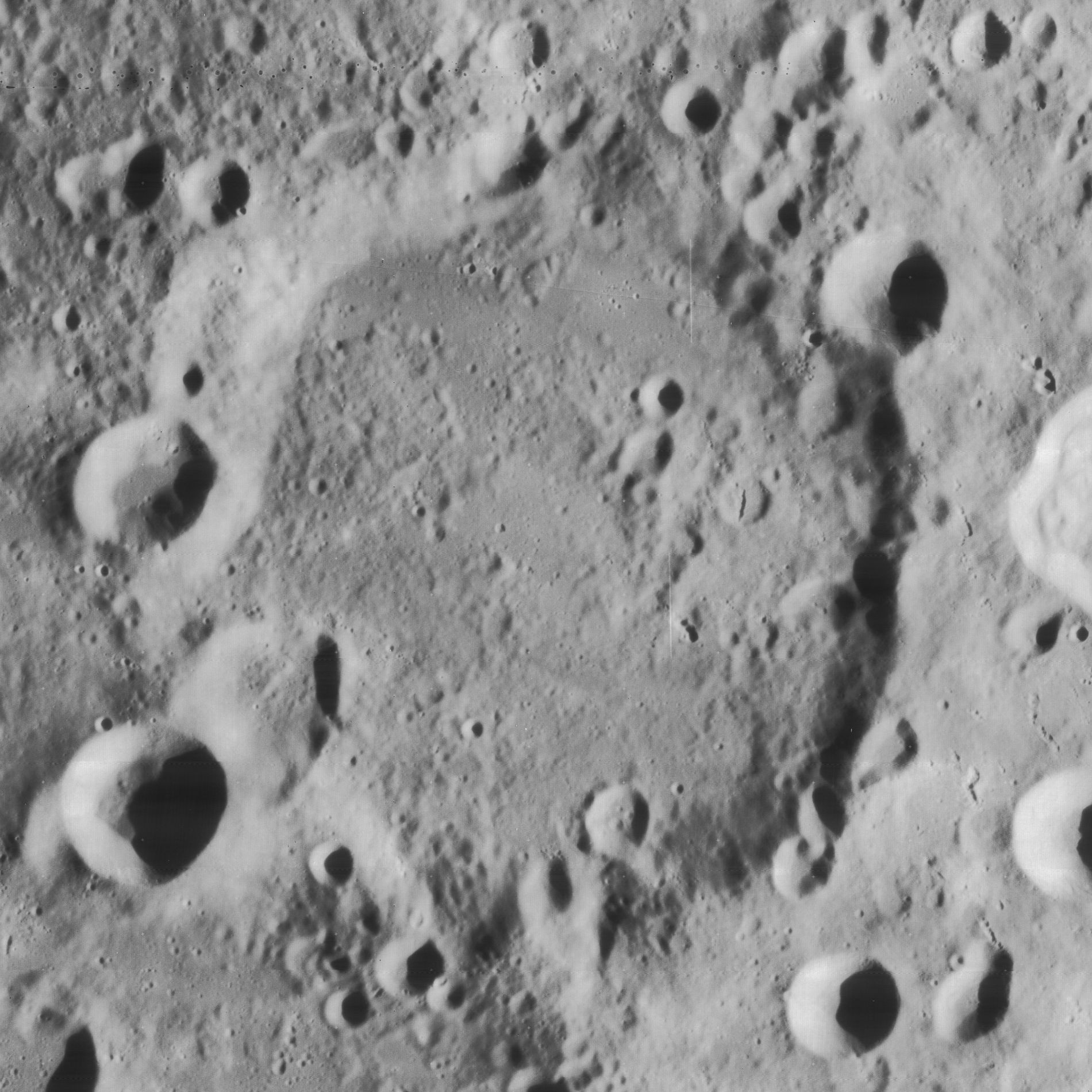
- Lunar Orbiter 4 image
- Coordinates: 43.1°S 20.8°W
- Diameter: 107 km
- Depth: 3.0 km
- Colongitude: 22° at sunrise
- Eponym: Wilhelm IV

Wilhelm is a lunar impact crater in the southern part of the Moon, to the west of the prominent Tycho. Portions of the ray material from Tycho lie across the rim and floor of Wilhelm. Attached to its southern rim is the crater Montanari, while Lagalla is attached to the southwest. To the north-northeast is Heinsius.

This crater is of the type traditionally termed a walled plain. It has a heavily eroded outer rim that is overlain by several smaller craters. Among these are Wilhelm A and Wilhelm K across the southwest rim, and Wilhelm B just to the northwest along the western rim. Wilhelm C intrudes into the north-northeast rim, and Wilhelm D is attached to the northeast outer rim. There is an outward protrusion in the southern rim that extends to contact Montanari.

The interior floor of Wilhelm is relatively level, with a rougher area to the northeast. The remainder is flat and almost featureless except for a few tiny craterlets.

== Satellite craters ==
By convention these features are identified on lunar maps by placing the letter on the side of the crater midpoint that is closest to Wilhelm.

Wilhelm	Latitude	Longitude	Diameter
A	44.6° S	22.0° W	20 km
B	43.5° S	22.8° W	19 km
C	41.6° S	19.5° W	15 km
D	41.8° S	17.7° W	32 km
E	44.1° S	17.9° W	14 km
F	42.4° S	23.1° W	9 km
G	42.5° S	25.9° W	17 km
H	42.5° S	23.8° W	7 km
J	41.5° S	26.2° W	19 km
K	44.1° S	21.7° W	21 km
L	40.4° S	22.1° W	9 km
M	44.0° S	17.3° W	9 km
N	43.7° S	18.5° W	7 km
O	43.1° S	17.2° W	17 km
P	40.9° S	20.5° W	12 km
Q	43.2° S	18.4° W	8 km
R	41.3° S	21.9° W	7 km
S	41.7° S	21.7° W	10 km
T	41.3° S	20.9° W	8 km
U	41.4° S	20.4° W	5 km
V	43.9° S	19.5° W	8 km
W	42.5° S	20.3° W	5 km
X	40.9° S	19.9° W	12 km
Y	44.5° S	20.9° W	5 km
Z	44.8° S	20.3° W	8 km
