= Nicolaas Heinsius the Elder =

17th century Dutch scholar and poet (1620–1681)

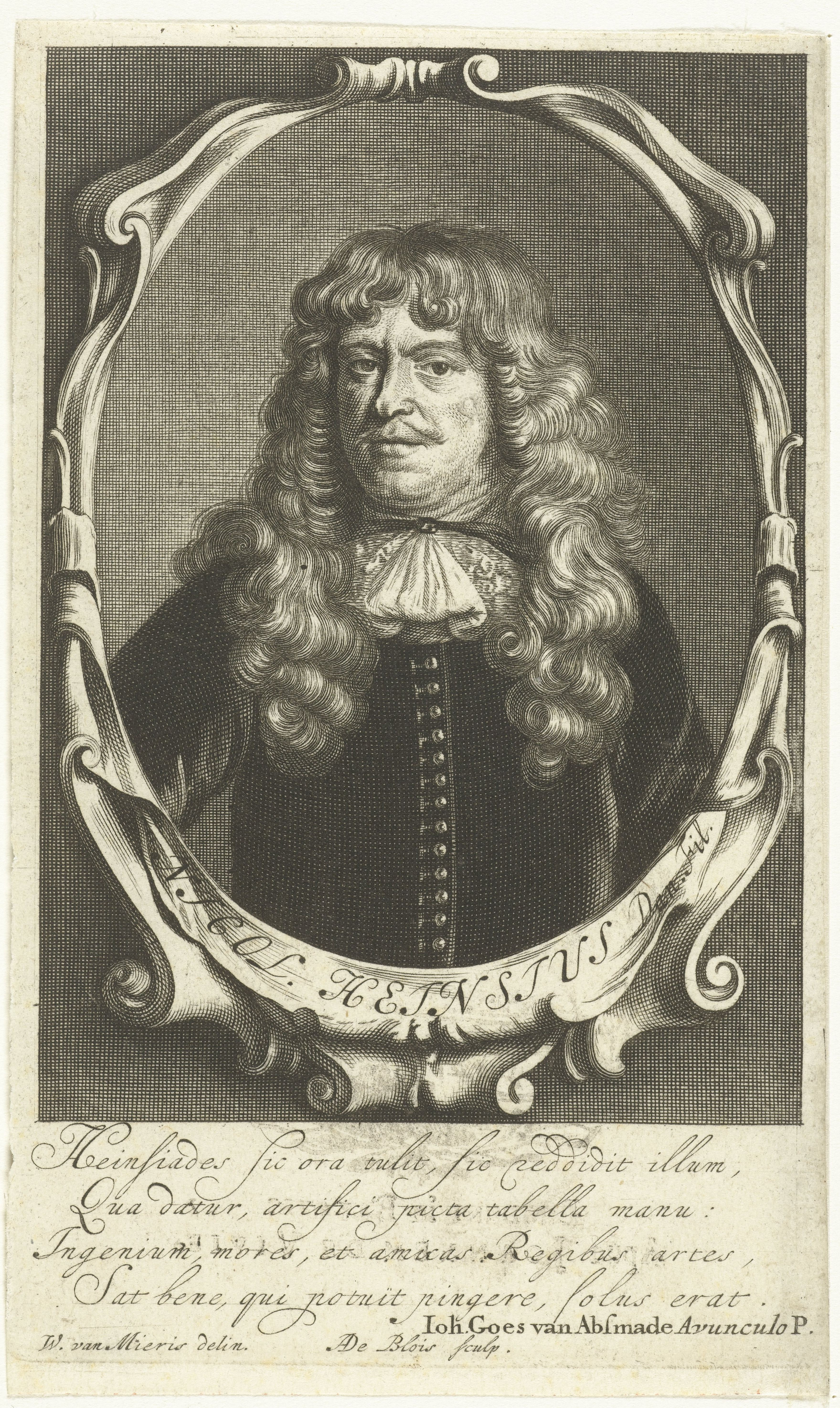
Portrait of Nicolaas Heinsius the Elder by Willem van Mieris

Nicolaas Heinsius the Elder (Latin: Nicolaus Heinsius; 20 July 1620 – 7 October 1681) was a Dutch classical scholar, poet and diplomat. He travelled all over Europe to visit the major libraries and over time collected Europe's largest private library in the field of classical literature. He is regarded as a brilliant text critic in his critical publications of Claudian, Ovid (his most important work), Vergil, Prudentius, Velleius and Valerius Flaccus.

== Life ==
Heinsius was born in Leiden, the Netherlands as the son of Daniel Heinsius, one of the most famous scholars of the Dutch Renaissance. His boyish Latin poem Breda expugnata was printed in 1637, and attracted much attention. In 1642 he began his wanderings with a visit to England in search of manuscripts of the classics but met with little courtesy from the English scholars. In ill health, he went to Spa in 1644 to seek a cure by drinking the local mineral water. His health restored, he set out once more in search of codices, passing through Leuven, Brussels, Mechelen, Antwerp and so back to Leiden, everywhere collating manuscripts and taking philological and textual notes.

Almost immediately he set out again, and arriving in Paris was welcomed with open arms by the French scholars. After studying the classical texts he could obtain, he traveled in 1646 southwards visited on the way Lyon, Marseille, Pisa, Florence (where he paused to publish a new edition of Ovid) and Rome. The next year, he was in Naples, which he left during the reign of Masaniello. He pursued his studies in Livorno, Bologna, Venice, where he received assistance from Jan Reynst and Padua. In Padua he published in 1648 his volume of original Latin verse entitled Italica.

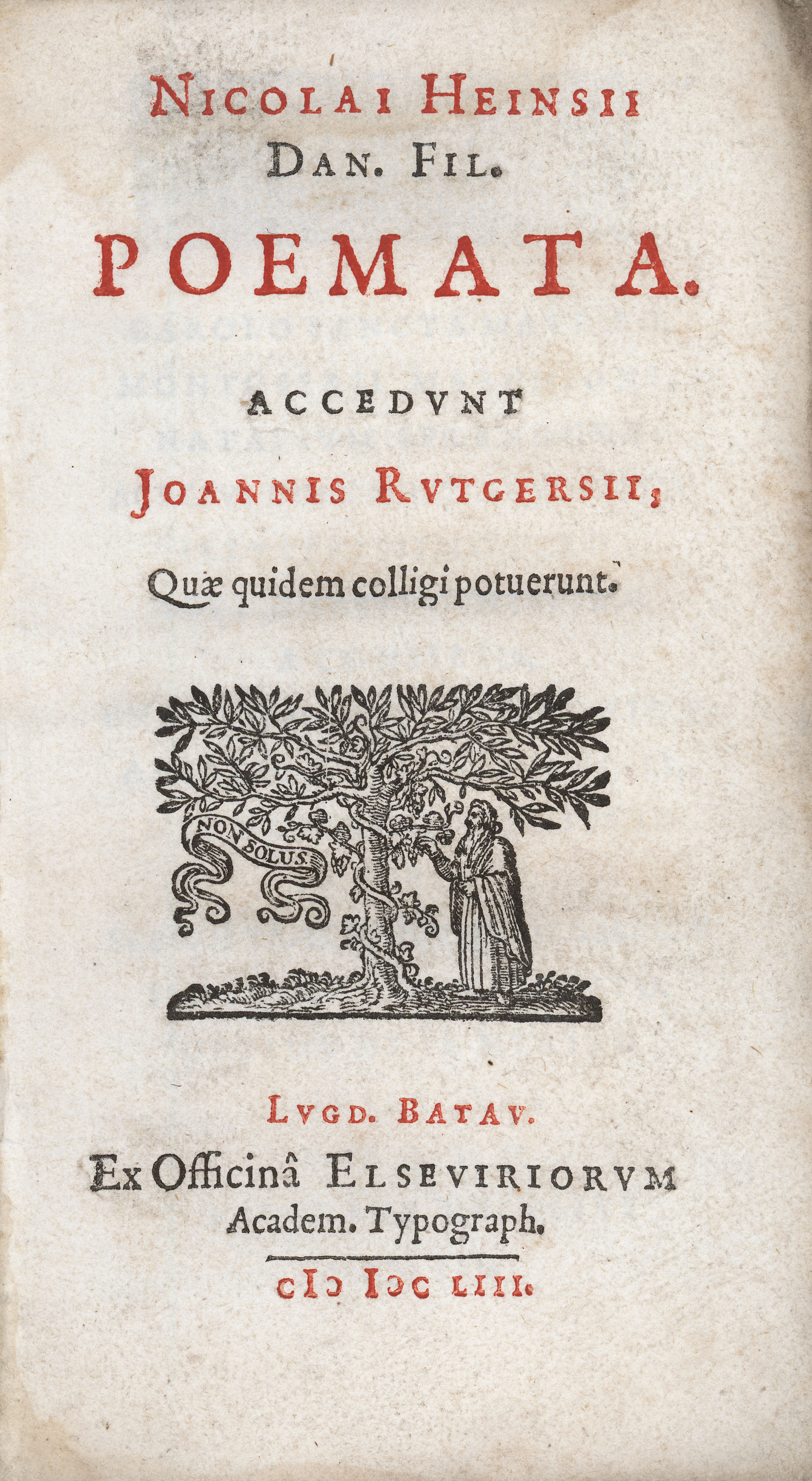
Title page of Poemata (1653)

He proceeded to Milan and worked for a considerable time in the Biblioteca Ambrosiana. While preparing to explore Switzerland the news of his father's illness recalled him hurriedly to Leiden. Soon after he was invited to Stockholm by Christina of Sweden. At the Swedish court he became embroiled in a heated dispute with Claudius Salmasius over the Greek of the New Testament. The quarrel became both highly personal and widely known, and Heinsius as university librarian refused him access to the books he wished to consult. Heinsius paid a brief visit to Leiden in 1650 and immediately returned to Stockholm. In 1651 he visited France and Italy with Isaac Vossius to buy books and coins for Christina. In 1654 Christina stepped down. Two years later Heinsius became a diplomat for the States General of the Netherlands at the invitation of Coenraad van Beuningen. In 1665 he was appointed by the city of Amsterdam as the official historian. In 1669 he visited Moscow and in 1672 Bremen. In 1675 he settled down in his country house near Vianen, but moved to the Hague later.

Heinsius had two illegitimate children by Margareta Wullen, daughter of a Lutheran minister from Stockholm, who was a nude model in Amsterdam. He married her only after a lawsuit, and did not want to recognise his sons, Daniel and Nicolaas Heinsius the Younger (1655–1718) but was eventually forced to do so. Nicolaas the Younger had to flee the Dutch Republic in 1677 for committing manslaughter in the streets of the Hague. Nicolaas the Younger became a physician, and in 1679 he was appointed Queen Christina of Sweden's private physician in Rome. He later returned to Holland and was the author of the Den vermakelyken avanturier, ofte De Wispelturige, en niet min Wonderlyke Levens-Loop van Mirandor (The Jolly Adventurer or the Unpredictable and not less Wonderful Life of Mirandor) (1695), the only Dutch-language romance novel of the 17th century.

Nicolaas the Elder collected one of the biggest private libraries in Europe. He was visited by Lorenzo Magalotti in 1668 when visiting the United Provinces. After his death about 13.000 books were sold in 1683. The famous catalogue was used by many scholars as a reference. He maintained an extensive correspondence with other scholars of his time such as Christiaan Huygens, Gaspar Gevartius and Albert Rubens, the son of Peter Paul Rubens.

In 1653 Heinsius collected his Latin poems into a volume. His latest labours were the editing of Velleius Paterculus in 1678 and of Valerius Flaccus in 1680. He died at The Hague on 7 October 1681.
