= Proctor (surname) =

Proctor is an English occupational surname, originally meaning 'steward', derived from Latin procurare ("to manage").

Notable people with the name include:

- Alexander Phimister Proctor (1860–1950), American sculptor
- Andy Proctor, English rugby league footballer
- Andrew Beauchamp-Proctor (1894–1921), South African RAF officer
- Barbara Gardner Proctor (1932–2018), first African American woman to own and operate an advertising agency
- Bernard E. Proctor (1901–1959), American food scientist
- Carlos Proctor (1907–1983), American college football player and coach
- Carolina Isakson Proctor (1930–2012), wife of 27th President of Colombia, Virgilio Barco Vargas
- Catherine Proctor (1878–1967), Canadian actress
- Charles Proctor (1905–1996), English choral conductor
- Charles Nancrede Proctor (1906–1996), American skier
- David Proctor (disambiguation)
- Dennis Proctor (1905–1983), British civil servant
- Dick Proctor (born 1941), Canadian activist
- Dorothy Proctor, Canadian author and activist
- Edna Dean Proctor (1829–1923), American poet
- Edward Proctor (1870–1944), English footballer
- Elaine Proctor (born 1960), South African film director, screenwriter, novelist, and actress
- Elizabeth Proctor (1652–?), American, figure of the Salem Witch Trials
- Eustace Proctor (born 1965), Anguillan cricketer
- F. F. Proctor (1851–1929), American vaudeville impresario
- Fletcher D. Proctor (1860–1911), American businessman and politician, 51st Governor of Vermont (1906–1908)
- Ford Proctor (born 1996), American baseball player
- Frank M. Proctor (1827/1828–1892), American lawyer and politician
- George Proctor (disambiguation)
- Harvey Proctor (born 1947), British politician
- Haydn Proctor (1903–1996), American politician and judge
- H. Dean Proctor (born c. 1942), American politician
- Henry Proctor (rower) (1929–2005), American rower
- Henry H. Proctor (1868–1933), minister of the First Congregational Church in Atlanta
- Howard Proctor (died 1938), American politician and manufacturer
- James Proctor (disambiguation)
- Jamie Proctor (born 1992), English football striker
- Jesse Proctor (1908–2001), Archdeacon of Warwick (1958–1974)
- John Proctor (disambiguation), multiple people
- Joseph Proctor (disambiguation), multiple people
- Josh Proctor (born 1999), American football player
- Kadyn Proctor (born 2005), American football player
- Kaleb Proctor (born 2004), American football player
- Kevin Proctor (born 1989), Australian rugby league player
- Kristin Proctor (born 1978), Norwegian-American actress
- Lionel Proctor (born 1979), Australian rules footballer
- Lyndsay Proctor, New Zealand rugby league player
- Mark Proctor (disambiguation), multiple people
- Mary Proctor (1862–1957), American astronomer
- Mary L. Proctor (born 1960), African American folk artist
- Mary Virginia Proctor (1854–1927), American journalist, philanthropist, social activist
- Matt Proctor (born 1992), New Zealand rugby union player
- Mel Proctor (born 1951), American sports broadcaster
- Michael Proctor (disambiguation), multiple people
- Montagu Proctor-Beauchamp (1860–1939), British Christian missionary
- Mortimer R. Proctor (1889–1968), American politician, 66th Governor of Vermont (1945–1947)
- Pat Proctor, United States Army colonel, writer, and wargame developer
- Philip Proctor (born 1940), American actor
- Philip Bridger Proctor (1870–1940), British civil servant, Director of Meat Supplies, Ministry of Food (1919–1921)
- R. David Proctor (born 1960), United States District Judge
- Rachel Proctor (born 1974), American country singer-songwriter
- Red Proctor (1900–1954), American Major League Baseball pitcher
- Redfield Proctor (1831–1908), American politician, former Governor of Vermont
- Redfield Proctor Jr. (1879–1957), American politician
- Richard A. Proctor (1837–1888), British astronomer
- Robert Proctor (disambiguation), multiple people
- Samuel Proctor (1919–2005), American historian
- Samuel DeWitt Proctor (1921–1997), American minister, educator, and civil rights activist
- Scot and Maurine Proctor, American couple, founders of the Latter-day Saint oriented website Meridian Magazine
- Scott Proctor (born 1977), American baseball player
- Senna Proctor (born 1998), British racing driver
- Shane Proctor (born 1985), American world champion bull rider (2011)
- Shara Proctor (born 1988), Anguillan-British long-jumper
- Shinelle Proctor (born 1991), Anguillan sprinter
- Sian Proctor (born 1970), American commercial astronaut
- Simon Proctor (born 1959), British composer, pianist, and flutist
- Susie Proctor (born 1940), American politician
- Tammy M. Proctor, American historian
- Thea Proctor (1879–1966), Australian artist
- Thomas Proctor (disambiguation), multiple people
- Toby Proctor, Canadian actor and voice actor
- Tom Proctor (footballer) (born 2009), English footballer
- Tyrese Proctor (born 2004), Australian basketball player
- W. Stanley Proctor (born 1939), American painter and sculptor
- Wayne Proctor (born 1972), Welsh rugby union player
- Wayne Proctor (rugby league), British rugby league player
- Wilfred Proctor (1893–1980), English football winger
- Willard L. Proctor (1915–1998), American racehorse trainer
- William Proctor (disambiguation), multiple people
- Xavier Proctor (born 1990), American football player

== Fictional characters ==
- Sgt./Lt. Carl Proctor, from the Police Academy franchise
- Graeme Proctor, from the British ITV soap opera, Coronation Street
- Kaz Proctor, main character in the television series Wentworth
- Paula Proctor, in the television series Crazy Ex-Girlfriend
- Doctor Victor Proctor, from Doctor Proctor's Fart Powder
- Proctor (comics), Marvel Comics character

== See also ==
- Procter, a surname
