= Adeline de Monseignat =

Dutch-Monegasque contemporary visual artist

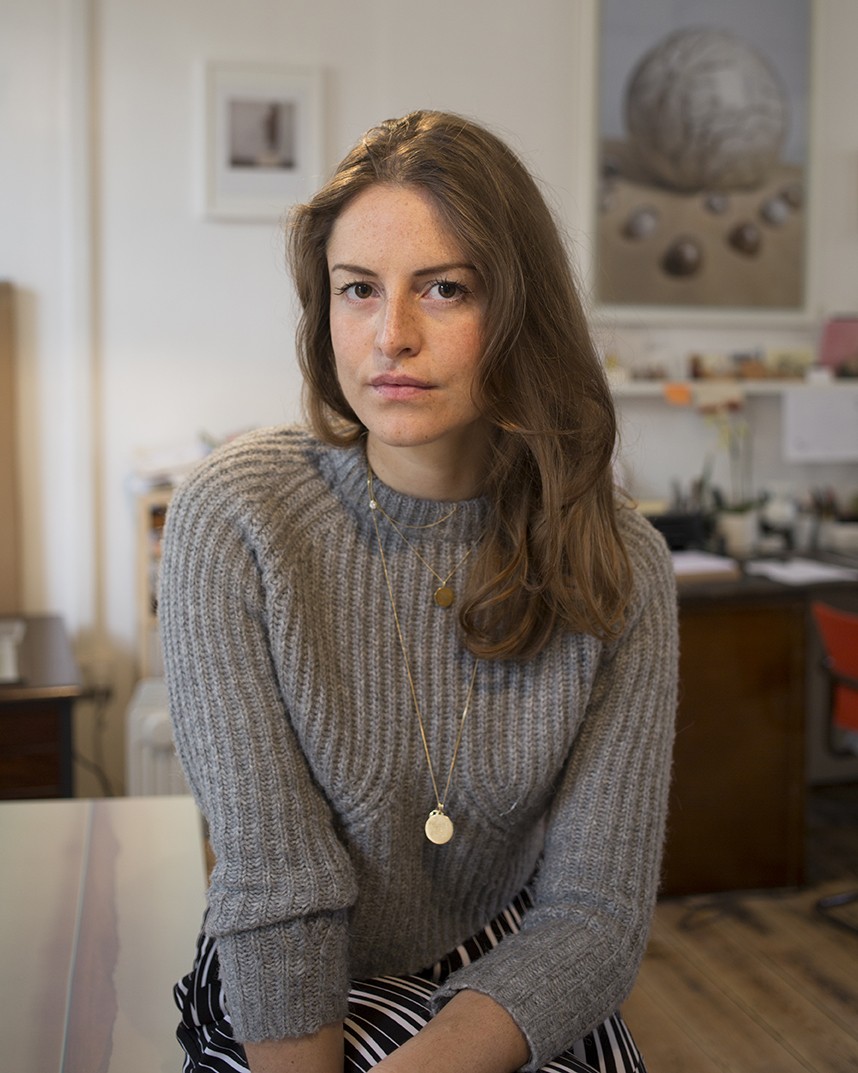
- de Monseignat in 2015
- Born: 1987 (age 38–39); Monaco
- Education: University College London (BA); Slade School of Fine Art; City and Guilds of London Art School (MFA)
- Style: Contemporary art
- Spouse: Pablo de Laborde Lascaris
- Website: adelinedemonseignat.com

Adeline de Monseignat (born 1987) is a Dutch-Monegasque contemporary visual artist who lives and works between London and Mexico City. Made from natural materials such as recycled fur, soil, textiles, glass and marble, her sculptures and installations show an interest in mythology, anthropology and psychology, especially the Uncanny.

== Education and career ==
Adeline de Monseignat obtained a Bachelor of Arts degree in Language and Culture from University College London in 2009, with an Erasmus year in 2007 spent studying Architecture and Design at Politecnico di Milano. She then completed her Fine Art Foundation Course at the Slade School of Fine Art in 2010 before graduating with a Master of Fine Arts degree, with distinction, from the City and Guilds of London Art School in 2011.

As a result of her degree show, curator Justin Hammond selected her to feature in the Catlin Guide, a book that features forty new promising graduate artists in the United Kingdom. She was thereafter shortlisted for the Catlin Art Prize, alongside nine other fellow artists including Julia Vogl, Jonny Briggs and Gabriella Boyd.

She was awarded the Catlin Art Prize Public Vote Prize in 2012. That same year she was shortlisted for the Threadneedle Prize at the Mall Galleries and was the recipient of the Royal Society of Sculptors Bursary Award in 2013.

In 2013, curator James Putnam brought Monseignat and artist Berndnaut Smilde together for her first show at Ronchini Gallery, The Uncanny.

In 2014, Ronchini Gallery held a solo exhibition of the artist's work entitled Home. Art historian Jo Applin wrote a text for a catalogue which was published to accompany the exhibition. She was interviewed by the BBC World Service that year about her use of recycled fur in her work, which aired on The Forum and later on BBC Radio 4.

In 2015, Monseignat did a mentorship with sculptor Gianpietro Carlesso who taught her stone carving. It is since then and since starting to spend time in Mexico in 2017 that she has made marble an integral part of her practice.

Her 2018 solo show entitled O held at Ronchini Gallery features sculptural works as well as her film In The Flesh which she shot in 2016 in the marble quarries of Carrara.

That year also marked the first time Monseignat ever shows work in Mexico, in a gallery called Galería de Arte Mexicano which held the 1940 International Surrealist Exhibition curated by André Breton. The exhibition entitled Synergia, with regrouped works by Pablo de Laborde Lascaris, Samuel Zealey, James Capper, Luke Hart, Manuel Munoz G.G. and Amy Stephens attracted such attention that it was taken on the following year by Latin America's only museum dedicated to sculpture, Museo Federico Silva in San Luis Potosi, Mexico.

In 2020, she showed extensively in Mexico, notably at Salon Acme, Zona Maco, Museo de Geologia UNAM, Studio Block M74 and Masa Galeria alongside artists such as Jose Davila, Perla Krauze, Gabriel Rico and Tezontle.

== Selected exhibitions ==
- 2011 – Reveal the Tension, solo show curated by Samia Calbayrac at Norman Rea Gallery, York, United Kingdom
- 2012 – Art Moscow, a presentation of her work sponsored by Christie's and the British Council, Moscow, Russia
- 2012 – The Catlin Art Prize, curated by Justin Hammond at the Londonewcastle Project Space, London, United Kingdom
- 2012 – Dividing Line, curated by Sumarria Lunn at High House Gallery, Oxfordshire, United Kingdom
- 2013 – The Future Can Wait, curated by Zavier Ellis at Victoria House, London, United Kingdom
- 2013 – The Uncanny, a two-people show alongside artist Berndnaut Smilde curated by James Putnam at the Ronchini Gallery, London, United Kingdom
- 2013 – The London Project, curated by Gerson Zevi at Yorkshire Sculpture Park, Yorkshire, United Kingdom
- 2013 – Articulate, Victoria Miro Gallery for Dramatic Need, an initiative by Amber Sainsbury, including works by Anish Kapoor, Antony Gormley, Whitney McVeigh and the Chapman Brothers, London, United Kingdom
- 2014 – Time to Hit the Road, Leila Heller Gallery, New York City, United States
- 2014 – Home, solo show, Ronchini Gallery, London, United Kingdom
- 2015 – Points of Contact, Cob Gallery, London, United Kingdom
- 2015 – Whispers - Project by Adeline de Monseignat, Ronchini Gallery, London, United Kingdom
- 2015 – UK/RAINE, Saatchi Gallery, London, United Kingdom
- 2016 – Beyond Borders, Blain Southern, London, United Kingdom
- 2016 – Art Barter Dubai, Alserkal Avenue, Dubai, United Arab Emirates
- 2016 – I am NOT tino sehgal, curated by Francesco Bonami, Nahmad Projects, London, United Kingdom
- 2016 – Sigmund's Shorts: In the Flesh, Freud Museum, London, United Kingdom,
- 2017 – House of Penelope, curated by Alteria Art, supported by the Gaia Art Foundation, Gallery 46, London, United Kingdom.
- 2017 – Force of Nature, curated by James Putnam, Mile End Art Pavilion, London, United Kingdom
- 2017 – Contemporary Sculpture Fulmer, curated by Brooke Benington, Fulmer, United Kingdom
- 2017 – L'Attesa, solo show curated by Roberto Lacarbonara, Exchiesetta, Polignano a Mare, Puglia, Italy
- 2018 – Synergia, Galería de Arte Mexicano, Mexico City, Mexico
- 2018 – O, Ronchini Gallery, London, United Kingdom
- 2018 – Skulpturenpark, Galerie Kandlhofer, Vienna, Austria
- 2018 – Cure3, Bonhams, London, United Kingdom
- 2019 – Through the Looking Glass, curated by Alteria Art and James Putnam, Cob Gallery, London, United Kingdom
- 2019 – Silogismos de la Construcción, curated by Alberto Rios, Studio Block M74, Mexico City, Mexico
- 2019 – Sisyphus in Retrograde, London, United Kingdom
- 2019 – Synergia, Museo Federico Silva, San Luis Potosi, Mexico
- 2020 – Fire Ladders, Museo de Geologia, Mexico City, Mexico
- 2020 – Recover/Uncover, Masa Galeria, Mexico City, Mexico
- 2020 – Salon Acme no.8, Salon Acme, Mexico City, Mexico

== Personal life ==
In 2019, Adeline de Monseignat married fellow sculptor Pablo de Laborde Lascaris who she met through the Royal Society of Sculptors. She was an integral part of the establishment of Studio Block M74 in Mexico City, a 900m2 space dedicated to sculpture which houses a number of sculptors' studios, artist residency and gallery spaces, which her husband runs alongside his own practice.

== See also ==
- List of Dutch women artists
- List of female sculptors
