= Procter =

Procter is a surname, and may refer to:

- Adelaide Anne Procter (1825–1864), British poet, daughter of Bryan Procter
- Alice McElroy Procter (1915-1987), American composer
- Andrea Procter, Canadian anthropologist
- Andrew Procter (cricketer) (born 1968), English cricketer
- Andrew Procter (born 1983), British association football player for Accrington Stanley F. C.
- Arthur Procter (disambiguation)
- Ben Procter (swimmer) (born 1990), British swimmer
- Ben H. Procter (1927–2012), American historian
- Bryan Procter (1787–1874), British poet
- Charles Procter (died 1773), Canadian ship owner and politician
- Chrystabel Procter (1894–1982), English gardener, educationalist and horticulturalist
- Cory Procter (born 1982), American football player
- Donna Procter (born 1969), Australian Olympic swimmer
- Emily Procter (born 1968), American actress
- Ernest Procter (1885–1935), English designer, illustrator and painter
- Evelyn Procter (1897–1980), British historian
- Henry Procter (disambiguation)
- Joan Beauchamp Procter (1897–1931), British herpetologist
- Joe Procter (1906–1989), New Zealand rugby union player
- John Procter (disambiguation)
- Leslie Procter (1884–1968), Australian politician
- Luke Procter (born 1988), English cricketer
- Maurice Procter (1906–1973), English novelist
- Mike Procter (1946–2024), South African cricketer
- Norma Procter (1928–2017), English contralto
- Peter Procter (born 1930), British cycling champion, rally driver and racing driver
- Raymond Procter (born 1938), New Zealand cricketer
- Richard Wright Procter (1816–1881), English barber, poet and author
- Simon Procter (born 1968), British artist and photographer
- William Procter (disambiguation)

== See also ==
- Proctor (disambiguation)
- Procter & Gamble, consumer products multinational
- Goodwin Procter, American law firm
