= Ronchini Gallery =

Coordinates: 51.5143°N 0.1456°W

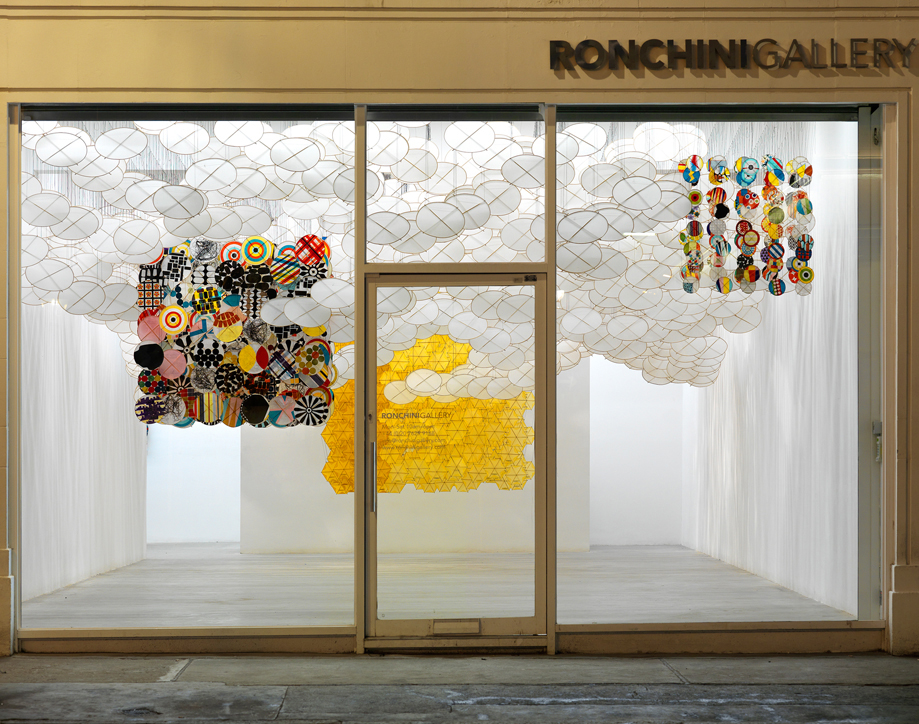
Ronchini Gallery Exterior

Ronchini Gallery is a contemporary art gallery founded by Lorenzo Ronchini in Umbria, Italy, in 1992. Artists exhibited at the gallery include: Jacob Hashimoto, Will Cotton, Conrad Marca-Relli, Berndnaut Smilde, Sean Lynch (artist), Paul Jenkins (painter), Mario Schifano, Alexander Calder, Alighiero Boetti, Rebecca Ward, and Paolo Serra. Originally heardquartered in Terni, the gallery moved to 22 Dering Street, Mayfair, London, in February 2012. The inaugural exhibition was titled Italian Beauty, and featured works by Giulio Paolini, Domenico Bianchi and Giò Ponti. The program focuses on international contemporary art.

Artists represented by the gallery include Adeline de Monseignat, Berndnaut Smilde, Jacob Hashimoto, Tameka Norris, and Rebecca Ward. In 2012, Ronchini Gallery announced the exclusive representation of the Conrad Marca-Relli Estate and mounted the American Abstract Expressionist’s artist first UK solo exhibition curated by David Anfam and Kenneth Baker. In 2013, the Gallery organised an exhibition of Alexander Calder and Fausto Melotti. In 2014 it hosted the first UK solo exhibitions of artists: Will Cotton, Berndnaut Smilde and Adeline de Monseignat. The gallery hosts 6-8 exhibitions per year.

== Exhibitions ==
- Elvire Boundelle: 25 January - 18 March 2017
- Tameka Norris: 25 November 2016 - 21 January 2017
- Trust Issues: 16 September - 18 November 2016.
- Richard Höglund: 28 June - 10 September 2016.
- Massimo Vitali: 19 May - 18 June 2016. Massimo Vitali’s first UK solo exhibition in 5 years.
- Gianpietro Carlesso and Paolo Serra: 18 March - 14 May 2016.
- Jan Fabre: Knight of the Dark 11 February - 12 March 2016. Fabre’s first UK solo exhibition.
- Adeline de Monseignat: Whispers 9 December 2015 - 30 January 2016.
- Rebecca Ward: aphasia 8 October - 5 December 2015.
- Ziggy Grudzinskas: I Can Because You Do 7 September - 3 October 2015.
- Hashtag Abstract: 2 July - 29 August 2015. Featured Oliver Clegg, Richard Höglund, Christopher Kuhn and Kasper Sonne. Curated by Kamiar Maleki.
- Sean Lynch: DeLorean Progress Report 21 May - 27 June 2015.
- Jens Wolf: 13 March - 17 May 2015.
- Pier Paolo Calzolari: Drawings, Projects and Works on Paper 23 January - 7 March 2015.
- Adeline de Monseignat: Home 14 November 2014 - 17 January 2015.
- All That Matters Is What's Left Behind 19 September - 8 November 2014. Young artists Alex Clarke, Phoebe Collings-James, Ziggy Grudzinskas, Prem Sahib, Rebecca Ward and Jens Wolf.
- Will Cotton: 25 June - 9 August 2014.
- Berndnaut Smilde: Antipode, 11 April — 14 June 2014.
- Tameka Norris: Almost Acquaintances 14 February - 29 March 2014.
- Paolo Scheggi: Selected Works from European Collections, 11 December 2013 — 8 February 2014.
- Alexander Calder and his Italian contemporary, Fausto Melotti: Children of the Sky, 11 October-30 November 2013.
- Summer Group Show, 21 June - 1 August 2013.
- Rebecca Ward: cow tipping, 12 April - 18 May 2013.
- The Uncanny, 16 January - 16 February 2013. Featured works by Berndnaut Smilde and Adeline de Monseignat.
- Olivo Barbieri, 30 November 2012 - 10 January 2013.
- Conrad Marca-Relli: The Architecture of Action, 10 October - 24 November 2012.
- Time After Time, 6 September - 2 October 2012. American artists Sam Falls, Andrew Brischler, David Mramor, Davina Semo and Rebecca Ward alongside Italian artists Michelangelo Pistoletto, Alighiero Boetti, Alberto Burri, Dadamaino, Piero Dorazio, Mario Schifano and Paolo Scheggi.
- Hashimoto: The Other Sun, 29 June - 29 August 2012.
- Italian Beauty (Giulio Paolini, Domenico Bianchi and Giò Ponti), 17 February - 5 April 2012.

== Selected publications ==
Ronchini Gallery publishes artist monographs and exhibition texts.

- Bland, Bartholomew. Dream No Small Dreams: The Miniature Worlds of Adrien Broom, Thomas Doyle and Patrick Jacobs, Ronchini Gallery, London, 2013. ISBN 978-1-62890-050-7
- Shaw, Cameron and Wilkerson, Emily. Tameka Norris: Almost Acquaintances, Ronchini Gallery, London, 2014. ISBN 978-0-99265-311-8
- Marziani, Gianluca. Calder & Melotti: Children of the Sky, Ronchini Gallery, London, 2013. ISBN 978-099265-310-1
- Farboud, Roxanna and Gregory, Eliza. All That Matters Is What's Left Behind, Ronchini Gallery, London: 2014. ISBN 978-0-9926531-2-5
- Applin, Jo. Adeline de Monseignat: Home, Ronchini Gallery, London: 2014. ISBN 978-0-9926531-3-2
- Nickas, Bob. Jens Wolf, Ronchini Gallery, London: 2015. ISBN 978-0-9926531-4-9
- Moszynska, Anna and Gregory, Eliza. Rebecca Ward: aphasia, Ronchini Gallery, London: 2015. ISBN 978-0-9926531-5-6
