= Proctor (disambiguation) =

A proctor is an overseer or representative in a legal, ecclesiastical or academic setting. It may also refer to:

== People ==
- Proctor (surname), includes a list of people with the name

== Place names ==
In the United States:

- Proctor, Kentucky
- Proctor, Minnesota
- Proctor, Missouri
- Proctor, Pennsylvania
- Proctor, Oklahoma
- Proctor, Texas
- Proctor, Vermont, a New England town
  - Proctor (CDP), Vermont, the village within the town
- Proctor, West Virginia

== Schools ==
- Proctor Academy, a boarding school in Andover, New Hampshire, USA
- Proctor High School, a secondary school in Proctor, Minnesota, USA

== Other uses ==
- Percival Proctor, a British radio trainer and communications aircraft of the Second World War and after
- Proctor (lunar crater)
- Proctor (Martian crater)
- Proctor compaction test
- a barley (Hordeum vulgare) cultivar

== See also ==
- Procter (surname)
- Procter & Gamble
