= John Proctor =

John Proctor may refer to:

- John Proctor (artist) (1836–1914), Scottish cartoonist and illustrator
- John Proctor (Salem witch trials) (1632–1692), hanged after being falsely accused and convicted for witchcraft
- John Proctor (historian) (1521–1558), English schoolmaster
- John Proctor (inventor) (1804–1822), American inventor
- John Proctor (FBI agent) (1926–1999), American FBI agent
- John Proctor (MP) (1520?–1558/59), English politician
- John Proctor (bobsleigh) (born 1950), American bobsledder
- John E. Proctor (1844–1944), American politician in the state of Florida
- Jack Proctor (1871–1893), English footballer
- John Clagett Proctor (1867–1956), American local historian, newspaper columnist, and printer

== See also ==
- John Procter (disambiguation)
- Proctor John, fictional character in Fear the Walking Dead
- Proctor (surname)
