= Michael Joo =

Korean-American contemporary artist

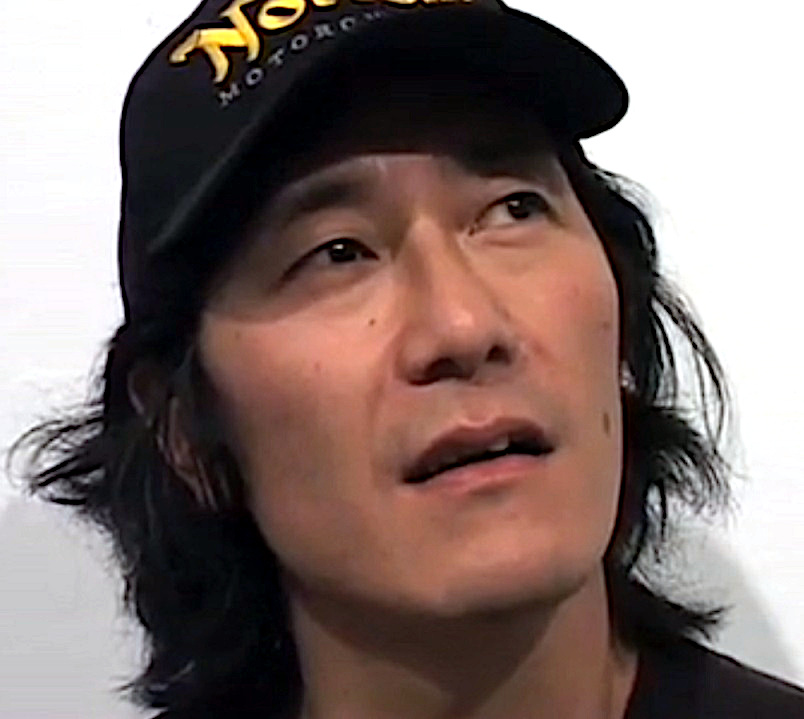
- Michael Joo in Speaking Portraits
- Born: 1966 (age 59–60); Ithaca, New York, U.S.
- Education: Wesleyan University; Washington University in St. Louis (BFA); Yale School of Art (MFA)
- Known for: Sculpture, installation art, photography, video art, painting, printmaking
- Movement: Contemporary art
- Awards: Guggenheim Fellowship (1998); Joan Mitchell Foundation Painters' and Sculptors' Grant (2000); Warhol Foundation Grant (2001); LEF Foundation Grant (2002); American Center Foundation Grant (2003); United States Artists Fellowship (2006); Grand Prize, 6th Gwangju Biennale (2006, with Song Dong)

Michael Joo is a contemporary artist known for using a combination of scientific language, processes and complex structures that speak to liminality, access, and transmission. Much like Joseph Beuys, Joo uses various media such as sculpture, photography, printmaking, and painting, further referencing cultural heritage, identity, and natural history. He also teaches at Columbia University in the MFA program.

== Early life and education ==
Michael Joo was born into a Korean family in 1966 Ithaca, New York. Joo's parents immigrated from South Korea in order to seek graduate studies at Cornell University. He lived in a small community that focused on academics. Joo grew up between New York state and Minnesota. By influence of his late father, Joo grew up “half in the lab and half on the ranch” as his father was a cattleman who studied animal breeding and his mother being in seed science. Joo studied Biology at Wesleyan University but felt disconnected with the subject. He practiced art in parallel while continuing his studies.

Eventually Joo lived and worked in Vienna, Austria, at a company that specialized in seed science. He often spent his time at the Secession exhibition hall, influenced by his artistic experience in Vienna. Joo graduated with a BFA from Washington University in St. Louis in 1989, and he later received his MFA in sculpture from the Yale School of Art, in New Haven, Connecticut, in 1991.

== Art ==
Joo’s artworks investigate concepts of identity and knowledge in a hybrid, contemporary world. Joo’s artworks often blend and collide seemingly disparate elements such as science and religion, fact versus fiction, and high and low culture. Human intervention in nature and the forms generated by these intersections is a recurring backdrop for his work. Using a range of materials and media, and with an emphasis on process, Joo juxtaposes humanity’s various states of knowledge and culture, addressing the fluid nature of identity itself, and prompting us to question how and why we perceive the world as we do. In performance/video works, he has swum through a ton of MSG, waited in the wild for elk to lick salt off of his body, and walked against the flow of crude oil along the Trans Alaskan Pipeline. Numerous art museums house Michael Joo's artwork in their permanent collections. These include Museum of Modern Art, Hammer Museum, Walker Art Center, LACMA, Guggenheim Museum, Whitney Museum of American Art and Moderna Museet.

=== Selected major works ===
“Salt Transfer Cycle, 1993-95”

The schizophrenic and elusive nature of ‘modern’ socio-cultural identities is the thematic concern of this video work. Playing on ideas of left brain vs. right brain, linear vs. cyclical, as well as specific Asian-American stereotypes, the work is also concerned with a notion of obsessive action as it relates to speed, energy expenditure/reclamation, consumption and artistic production. The work consists of three segments shot in three specific locations; New York, Utah and South Korea. The artist acts as protagonist in each sequence.

Footage from the first site, the artist’s studio in New York’s Chinatown district, includes a bath or swim through two thousand pounds of monosodium glutamate (MSG).

The Great Salt Desert in Utah, site of U.S. land-speed trials, is the location of the next segment. In this sequence, the protagonist performs a parody of evolution as he gradually evolves from a swimming organism to a four legged creature to a bipedal being. Each stage of development takes place on the bed of the salt flats and results in the protagonist’s body being completely covered in salt.

The final segment of the video takes place in the northern mountains of South Korea. Elk horns and antler blood are harvested here annually for their supposed medicinal properties. The performance/action takes place just prior to the spring ‘collection’ of antlers. The action of this sequence involves the artist, completely covered in a visible layer of salt, waiting in the landscape for the elk to lick the salt off of his body. Serving as a human slat-lick for the elk, this segment completes the transfer of the salt (as energy precipitate) from the ideas and artifice of the studio to the reality of nature by entering the actual blood streams of the elk.

First exhibited in 1993 as a co-presentation by Petzel/Borgman, the original installation consisted of a large-scale wall projection, which shared the space with a set of horizontal cargo bars that suspended engraved trays against the walls overhead by exerting outward pressure, in a gesture of expanding the space. A urethane foam-carved replica of the record setting speed car, "the Blue Flame" was also displayed atop a plinth of Monosodium Glutamate bags and alongside a cast rubber 5-gallon fuel canister. Two additional performance videos on monitors resting atop columns of pressure cast salt blocks played simultaneously and out of synch so content was in constant flux. One video showed the artist trying to balance a large glass level filled with liquid mercury and the other presented stock footage of the Blue Flame shot in Utah during speed trials.

The work was also shown at the ARC Musee d'Art Moderne de la Ville de Paris, France; New York Film Festival; Anthony d'Offay Gallery, London; and Walker Art Center, among others around that period, and later at the Rodin Gallery of the Samsung Foundation for Art and Culture (2007), MIT List Visual Arts Center (2003). It is included in several prominent museum collections.

"God II", 2003, 40" x 61" x 61", Cast urethane, polyethylene plastic, cotton, leather, seal, wolf, rubber, plexiglass base with refrigerated top surface.

First exhibited in 2002 at the Anton Kern Gallery in New York, this interactive artwork a clear, cast figure rests atop a refrigerated base. Over time, the condensed breath of viewers combines with humidity in the work's immediate environment to form thick layers of frost that begin to fuse with and obscure the figure. The work holds the figure as central while the imperceptible takes place to slowly remove its visual dominance. The work plays with the idea of transparency on a multiple levels and connects with an earlier work from 1999 entitled "Visible", in which a transparent, headless Buddha figure literally presents its internal organs like an anatomical model.

The work was later shown in Joo's 2003 retrospective at the MIT List Visual Arts Center, Cambridge, Massachusetts, at the Serpentine Gallery in the Damien Hirst curated exhibition "In the Darkest Hour There May Be Light (2006).

"Circannual Rhythm (pibloktok)", 2003–2005, Three channel video projection with sound, Installed dimensions variable."

"In our information rich, technologically saturated contemporary lives, we are under the illusion that no part of the planet is inaccessible to us. The action in this video work addresses the idea that our concept of the “fringe” or edge is in flux, and in conflict with our physical selves. Shot in several locations across Alaska, it consists of three distinct video segments involving themes of time and decay, first and third worlds (as implied by a frontier), sociological vs. psychological, corruption/consumption and revelation. Each of the three parts of the project depict sets of dual realities: 1) the physical movement of a human body to the edge of a continent and the interior journey resulting from deprivation, lack of contact, and deterioration; 2) the imposition of socio-cultural values upon a religious or spiritually based action; and 3) exploiting the predictability of nature to yield unpredictable visual results. These forces are played out in the melting snowfields of a shrinking world, defined by the outside as a “disappearing frontier.” The distinct segments address real events under artificial conditions (the walking sequence), fictional actions to describe an actual condition (the possession sequence), and real events to depict a specific reality (the feeding sequence.)" -M Joo

This work, first exhibited in prototypical form at the MIT List Visual Arts Center in Cambridge, Massachusetts, in 2003 and later in 2006 in its final, fifty-foot wide, nine-channel, three projector format at the Bohen Foundation's exhibition venue on 13th Street, Manhattan as the center piece of Joo's solo show, "Still Lives".

The work consists of three distinct segments, and was shot over a multi-year period of engagement with travel and research across Alaska. In it, Joo serving as protagonist, walks against the flow of the Trans Alaska Pipeline, traveling the length of the Dalton Highway north of Fairbanks, across multiple micro-climates and changing vistas, up to its source at Prudhoe Bay, as Joo himself deteriorates. The shoot For the second, flanking segment, Joo placed a sculpted and taxidermied Caribou outfitted internally (and externally) with infrared security cameras into the Denali wilderness, recording its encounter and interactive absorption over time by the elements, insects, expanding intestines, and a wolf. The sculpture served as a clock of sorts, also acting as center piece and backdrop for night and day. In a third segment Joo collaborated with local Inupiat citizens who were cast in Barrow, Alaska through an open call. These performers were from diverse backgrounds and all involved in the local whaling community. Shooting took place at a remote site on the edge of the Arctic Ocean that locals called "Hollywood". These snow covered ruins of a traditional sod house were in fact the long abandoned set of a French ethnographic film production. The segment itself involved characters excavating this structure, which prompts a dramatic seizure in which physiological trauma and shamanistic possession are merged.

“Single Breath Transfer (Series Works), 2017-present ”

"The works are essentially about the transformation of material and transmission from one being to another, whether breath, knowledge or experience… things shared and what is lost and gained. The process involved in creating the glass sculptures is initiated by breathing into simple discarded paper and plastic bags that are solidified and made into ceramic shell molds, into which clear and colored molten glass are then blown. Entitled Single Breath Transfers, the vessels refer on one hand to a clinical test that is done to gauge the level of absorption by the lungs/body as opposed to what is exhaled. It involves a single breath of carbon monoxide, inhaled and then exhaled to determine what has remained. On the other, the works also refer to the transfer (of breath) from one body to another’s; in this case the glass blower’s. In this way, first the paper (or plastic) and then the glass itself, acts as a skin that separates and contains the breath from the outside." -M Joo

== Personal life ==
He currently lives and works in New York, New York, as a Senior Critic in Sculpture at Yale University. He maintains multiple studios in New York City and one in Seoul.

== Solo and group exhibitions ==
=== Solo exhibitions ===
2021:

- Michael Joo, Sensory Meridian, Kavi Gupta, Chicago, Illinois

2019:

- Project: Michael Joo, February 9, 2019 – March 16, 2019, Kavi Gupta Gallery, Chicago, US

2017:

- Michael Joo, Kukje Gallery, Seoul, KR

2016–2017:

- Perspectives: Michael Joo, Arthur M. Sackler Gallery, Smithsonian Institution, Washington, D.C.
- (forthcoming) Michael Joo, La Galeria Carles Taché, Barcelona, ES
- Seven Sins, Carolina Nitsch Project Room, New York, New York

2013:

- Michael Joo, M Building, Art Basel Miami Beach 2013, Miami, US

2009:

- Anton Kern Gallery, New York, US
- Bodhi Obfuscatus (Allegiance), Chelsea Art Museum, New York, US

2006:

- Michael Joo, Rodin Gallery (Leeum, Samsung Museum of Art), Seoul, KR

=== Group exhibitions ===
2020:

- The Written Word, online exhibition, Kavi Gupta, Chicago, Illinois
- Radical Optimism, online exhibition, Kavi Gupta, Chicago, Illinois
- The Art of Collecting, Shoshana Wayne Gallery, Los Angeles, California

2019:

- Reason Gives No Answers: Selected Works from the Collection, Newport Street Gallery, London, UK

2016:

- Anyang Public Art Project, Anyang-si, KR
- Still (the) Barbarians, Curated by Koyo Kouoh, EVA International Biennale 2016, Limerick, IE
- Force of Nature (curated by James Putnam), Galerie Valérie Bach, Brussels, BE

2010:

- Have You Ever Really Looked at the Sun?, Haunch of Venison, Berlin, Germany (with Damien Hirst)
- The Infinite Starburst of Your Cold Dark Eyes, PKM Gallery, Seoul, KR
- Dirty Kunst, Seventeen Gallery, London, UK

== Awards ==
- 2006: United States Artists Fellowship
- 2006: Grand Prize, 6th Gwangju Biennale 2006 (with co-recipient Song Dong)
- 2003: American Center Foundation Grant
- 2002: LEF Foundation
- 2001: Warhol Foundation Grant
- 2000: Joan Mitchell Foundation Painters' and Sculptors' Grant
- 1998: John Simon Guggenheim Memorial Foundation Fellowship
