= George Proctor =

George Proctor may refer to:

- George O. Proctor (1847–1925), American politician in Massachusetts
- George R. Proctor (1920–2015), American botanist
- George Willis Proctor (1848–?), state legislator in Florida
- George Wyatt Proctor (1946–2008), American author, journalist, and lecturer

== See also ==
- Proctor (surname)
