= Gianpietro =

Gianpietro is a masculine Italian given name. Notable people with the name include:

- Gianpietro Carlesso (born 1961), Italian artist
- Gianpietro Marchetti (born 1948), Italian footballer
- Gianpietro Piovani (born 1972), Italian footballer and manager
- Gianpietro Zecchin (born 1983), Italian footballer
