= James Proctor =

James Proctor may refer to:

- James Proctor (priest) (fl. 1572–1575), English priest
- James McPherson Proctor (1882–1953), United States federal judge
- James Proctor (footballer) (1892–?), English footballer
- Jim Proctor (born 1935), American baseball player
- James E. Proctor Jr. (1936–2015), American politician
- James D. Proctor (born 1957), American scholar and professor
- Jamie Proctor (born 1992), English footballer

== See also ==
- Proctor (surname)
