= Mark Proctor =

Mark Proctor may refer to:

- Mark Proctor (racing driver) (born 1968), former British racing driver
- Mark Proctor (footballer) (born 1961), former English footballer and former manager of Scottish football club Livingston
- Mark Proctor (shot putter) (born 1963), British Olympic shot-putter
- Mark Proctor (canoeist) (born 1993), British slalom canoeist
- Mark Proctor (politician), American politician

== See also ==
- Proctor (surname)
