= Conrad Marca-Relli =

American painter

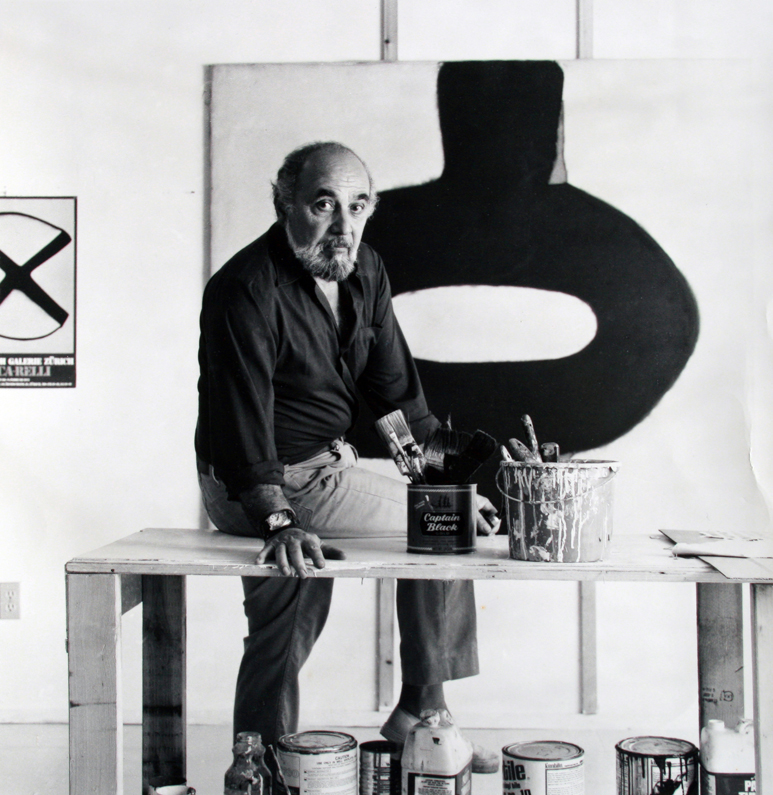
- Marca-Relli in 1982 in his studio
- Born: Corrado Marcarelli; June 5, 1913; Boston, Massachusetts, U.S.
- Died: August 29, 2000 (aged 87); Parma, Italy
- Education: New York School
- Known for: Painting
- Movement: Abstract expressionism

Conrad Marca-Relli (born Corrado Marcarelli; June 5, 1913 – August 29, 2000) was an American artist who belonged to the early generation of New York School Abstract Expressionist artists whose artistic innovation by the 1950s had been recognized across the Atlantic, including Paris. New York School Abstract Expressionism, represented by Jackson Pollock, Willem de Kooning, Franz Kline, Robert Motherwell, John Ferren, Marca-Relli and others became a leading art movement of the postwar era.

== Biography ==
Marcarelli (he changed the spelling later in life) was born in Boston. His parents Cosimo and Genovina Marcarelli were Italian immigrants from Benevento. Marcarelli moved to New York City when he was 13 where he grew up with his brother Ettore, and sisters Dora and Ida. In 1930 he studied at the Cooper Union for a year. And a year later he opened his own studio in New York and managed to earn an income by teaching and producing occasional illustrations for the daily and weekly press. He later supported himself by working for the Works Progress Administration, first as a teacher and then with mural painting divisions of the Federal Art Project during this period he won the Logan Medal of the Arts. He served in the US Army military service during World War II (1941–1945).

Marca-Relli taught at Yale University from 1954 to 1955 and from 1959 to 1960, and at the University of California, Berkeley. In 1953, he bought a house near Jackson Pollock's home in Springs, East Hampton. As his career progressed, he increasingly distanced himself from the New York School.

He lived and worked in many countries around the world, eventually settling in Parma, Italy with his wife, Anita Gibson, whom he married in 1951. Conrad Marca-Relli died on August 29, 2000, in Parma, at the age of 87.

== Career ==
After the war Marca-Relli joined the "Downtown Group" which represented group of artists who found studios in lower Manhattan in the area bounded by 8th and 12th street between First and Sixth Avenues during the late 1940s and early 1950s. During the late 1940s and early 1950s, he was actively involved in the avant-garde art world in Greenwich Village. These artists were called the "Downtown Group" as opposed to the "Uptown Group" established during the war at The Art of This Century Gallery.

His first one-man show was in New York City in 1948. In 1949 Marca-Relli was among the founders of the "Artists' Club" located at 39 East 8th Street. He was selected by his fellow artists to show in the Ninth Street Show held on May 21 to June 10, 1951. The show was located at 60 East 9th Street on the first floor and the basement of a building which was about to be demolished.

The artists celebrated not only the appearance of the dealers, collectors and museum people on the 9th Street, and the consequent exposure of their work but they celebrated the creation and the strength of a living community of significant dimensions.

Conrad Marca-Relli was among the 24 out of a total 256 New York School artists included in the Ninth Street Show and in all the following New York Painting and Sculpture Annuals from 1953 to 1957. These Annuals were important because the participants were chosen by the artists themselves.

Marca-Relli's early cityscapes, still lifes, circus themes and architectural motifs are reminiscent of Italian surrealist painter Giorgio de Chirico. Throughout his career, Marca-Relli created monumental-scale collages. He combined oil painting and collage, employing intense colors, broken surfaces and expressionistic spattering. He also experimented with metal and vinyl materials. Over the years the collages developed an abstract simplicity, evidenced by black or somber colors and rectangular shapes isolated against a neutral backdrop.

In 1967, the Whitney Museum of American Art gave him a retrospective show.

The Archivio Marca-Relli, which was established by the artist and Galleria d'arte Niccoli in Parma in 1997, collects information about Conrad Marca-Relli and archives his work for a future general catalogue.

== Exhibitions ==
- 1947, 1949, 1951: Niveau Gallery, New York City
- 1948-1949: Galleria Il Cortile, Rome
- 1953, 1956, 1958: Stable Gallery, New York City
- 1956: Frank Perls Gallery, Los Angeles & Hollywood
- 1957: Galleria La Tartaruga, Rome
- 1957, 1962:Galleria del Naviglio, Milan
- 1959, 1960–1964: Kootz Gallery, New York City
- 1960: Sharon Playhouse Gallery, Sharon, Connecticut
- 1961: Galerie Schmela, Düsseldorf; Bolles Gallery, San Francisco; Joan Peterson Gallery, Boston; Instituto de Arte Contemporáneo, Lima
- 1962: Galerie de France, Paris;
- 1963: Galerie Charles Lienhard, Zürich; Tokyo Gallery, Tokyo
- 1965: Galería Bonino, Buenos Aires
- 1967: James David Gallery, Coral Gables, Florida; Makler Gallery, Philadelphia; Whitney Museum of American Art, New York City; Rose Art Museum, Brandeis University, Waltham, Massachusetts
- 1968: University of Alabama, Tuscaloosa, Alabama; Alpha Gallery, Boston; Albright-Knox Art Gallery, Buffalo, New York
- 1969: Seattle Art Museum, Seattle; Reed College, Portland, Oregon
- 1970: University of Maryland Art Gallery, College Park, Maryland; Norton Gallery and School of Art, West Palm Beach, Florida
- 1970, 1975, 1979: Marlborough Gallery, New York City
- 1971: Galerie Schmela, Düsseldorf; Fort Lauderdale Museum of Art, Fort Lauderdale, Florida; Lowe Art Museum at University of Miami, Coral Gables, Florida
- 1972, 1975: Galería Carl Van der Voort, Ibiza
- 1973: Galería Ynguanzo, Madrid; Galerie Numaga, Auvernier, Neuchâtel; Galerie Bahlsen, Berlin
- 1974, Marlborough Galerie, Zürich; Makler Gallery, Philadelphia
- 1975, Marlborough-Goddard Gallery, Toronto and Montreal
- 1977, Galería Lanzenberg, Ibiza; Cordier & Ekstrom Gallery, New York City
- 1978, Galería Joan Prats, Barcelona
- 1978–1979: Carone Gallery, Fort Lauderdale, Florida
- 1979: Fort Lauderdale Museum of Art. Fort Lauderdale, Florida
- 1979–1980: John & Mable Ringling Museum of Art, Sarasota, Florida
- 1981: Hokin Gallery, Chicago
- 1982: Phoenix Gallery, Washington, D.C.; G.M.B. Gallery, Birmingham, Michigan
- 1983: Alex Rosenberg Gallery, New York City
- 1985–1987, 1989, 1991: Marisa del Re Gallery, New York City
- 1986: R.H. Love Gallery, Chicago
- 1990: Riva Yares Gallery, Scottsdale, Arizona
- 1990: 2002: Galleria d'Arte Niccoli, Parma
- 1996: Vered Gallery, East Hampton, New York
- 1998: Fondazione Peggy Guggenheim, Venice
- 2000: Institut Mathildenhöhe, Darmstadt
- 2002: Galleria d'arte Niccoli, Parma
- 2004: Joan T. Washburn Gallery, New York City; Galleria Open Art, Prato
- 2006: Lagorio Arte Contemporanea, Brescia
- 2008: Rotonda della Besana, Milan
- 2008: Fort Lauderdale (Florida), Museum of Art
- 2009: Knoedler & Company Gallery, New York City
- 2010: Galleria d'arte Bergamo, Bergamo
- 2011: Knoedler & Company Gallery, New York City
- 2011: Pollock Krasner House&Study Center, East Hampton
- 2012: Ronchini Gallery, London
- 2016: Hollis Taggart Galleries, New York City
- 2016: Galleria Open Art, Prato
- 2016: Repetto Gallery, London
- 2017: Pavel Zoubok Gallery, New York
- 2018: De Primi Fine Art, Lugano
- 2019: Artefiera, Bologna (monographic booth)
- 2019: Ronchini Gallery, London

== Works in museums and public collections ==
- James A. Michener Art Museum, Doylestown, Pennsylvania
- Allentown Art Museum, Allentown, Pennsylvania
- The University of Michigan Museum of Art, Ann Arbor, Michigan
- High Museum of Art, Atlanta,
- Jack S. Blanton Museum of Art, Austin, Texas
- Museu d'Art Contemporani MACBA, Barcelona
- University of California, Berkeley Art Museum, Berkeley, California
- Sammlung Reinhard Onnasch, Berlin
- Solomon R. Guggenheim Museum, Bilbao
- Boca Raton Museum of Art, Boca Raton, Florida
- Albright-Knox Art Gallery, Buffalo, New York
- Fogg Art Museum, Cambridge, Massachusetts
- Harvard University Art Museums, Cambridge, Massachusetts
- The Art Institute of Chicago, Chicago
- Cleveland Museum of Art, Cleveland
- Museum of Art and Archaeology, Columbia, Missouri
- University of Missouri, Columbia, Missouri
- Lowe Art Museum, Coral Gables, Florida
- Denver Art Museum, Denver
- Detroit Institute of Arts, Detroit
- Museum of Art Fort Lauderdale, Fort Lauderdale, Florida
- Wadsworth Atheneum, Hartford, Connecticut
- Houston Museum of Fine Arts, Houston
- Indianapolis Museum of Art, Indianapolis
- Sheldon Memorial Art Gallery, Lincoln, Nebraska
- Los Angeles County Museum of Art, Los Angeles
- Walker Art Center, Minneapolis
- Minneapolis Institute of Arts, Minneapolis
- Yale University Art Gallery, New Haven, Connecticut
- Solomon R. Guggenheim Museum, New York City
- Metropolitan Museum of Art, New York City
- Governor Nelson A. Rockefeller Empire State Plaza Art Collection, Albany, NY
- Museum of Modern Art, New York City
- Whitney Museum of American Art, New York City
- Collection of the Chase Manhattan Bank, New York City
- Fred Jones Jr. Museum of Art, Norman, Oklahoma
- Pennsylvania Academy of Fine Arts, Philadelphia
- Carnegie Institute, Pittsburgh
- Portland Art Museum, Portland, Oregon
- Neuberger Museum of Art, Purchase, New York
- Memorial Art Gallery, Rochester, New York
- San Francisco Museum of Modern Art, San Francisco
- John & Mable Ringling Museum of Art, Sarasota, Florida
- Telfair Museum of Art, Savannah, Georgia
- Seattle Art Museum, Seattle
- Mildred Lane Kemper Art Museum, St. Louis, Missouri
- St. Paul Gallery of Art, Saint Paul, Minnesota
- Munson-Williams-Proctor Arts Institute, Utica, New York
- Fondazione Peggy Guggenheim, Venice
- Rose Art Museum at Brandeis University, Waltham, Massachusetts
- National Gallery of Art, Washington, D.C.
- Smithsonian American Art Museum, Washington, D.C.
- Colby College Museum of Art, Waterville, Maine

== See also ==
- Action painting

== Catalogs ==
- Corrado di Marca-Relli. oils; Text by H. Elkin; Exhibition: Niveau Gallery New York, 1947
- Corrado di Marca-Relli, New Paintings; Exhibition: The New Gallery, New York, 1951
- Marca-Relli: Pastes a painting; Parker Tyler in "ArtNews", November New York, 1955
- Marca-Relli; Text by Gillo Dorfles; Exhibition: Galleria del Naviglio, Milano, 1957
- Marca-Relli - Kootz; Text by W.Rubin; Exhibition: Kootz Gallery, New York, 1959
- William C Agee, Conrad Marca-Relli (New York, Published in the occasion of the personal exhibition at Whitney Museum of American Art by F.A. Praeger, 1967.) OCLC: 1555599
- Conrad Marca-Relli; Marlborough-Gerson Gallery, Marca-Relli Feb. 1970 (New York : Marlborough-Gerson Gallery; Associated galleries: Marlborough Fine Art (London) Ltd., Marlborough Galleria d'Arte, 1970) OCLC: 56224536
- Conrad Marca-Relli; Cordier & Ekstrom, Marca-Relli, new constructions & collages on paper : March 23 to April 23, 1977 (New York : Cordier & Ekstrom, 1977) OCLC: 47714830
- Conrad Marca-Relli; Santiago Amón; Galeria Joan Prats, Marca-Relli 1976-1978(Barcelona : Ediciones Polígrafa, [1978?]) ISBN 84-343-0265-9, ISBN 978-84-343-0265-5; OCLC: 6284061
- Conrad Marca-Relli, Conrad Marca Relli : the early years, 1955-1962: February 3-27, 1979 (New York : Marlborough Gallery, 1979.) OCLC: 6059559
- Conrad Marca-Relli; Alex Rosenberg Gallery, Conrad Marca-Relli, homage to la belle epoque : new works : October 5-31, 1983 (New York, N.Y. : Alex Rosenberg Gallery, [1983]) OCLC: 47715196
- Marca-Relli; Text by Dore Ashton; Galleria d'Arte Niccoli, Parma, Italy 1990. Exhibition: October 6-November 26, 1990
- Reclaiming Artists of the New York School Toward a More Inclusive view of the 1950s, Exhibition: March 18-April 22, Baruch College CUNY, New York City, 1994 Mishkin Gallery
- Marca-Relli:Tensioni Composte/Composite Tensions; Works from 1939 to 1997; Text by Bruno Corà; Pacini Editore and Galleria Open Art, Prato; 2004 [anthological exhibition, October 14, 2004 – January 8, 2005, Prato, Galleria Open Art] ISBN 88-7781-628-7
- Conrad Marca-Relli; The New York Years 1945 - 1967; Text by Jasper Sharp; Knoedler & Company Publisher, New York, 2009; Exhibition: September 12 - November 14, 2009, New York, Knoedler & Company Gallery ISBN 978-0-9820749-4-7
- Conrad Marca-Relli. City to town, essays by Carter Ratcliff 2011, Knoedler&Company Gallery publisher, New York, 2011; exhibition: May 5 - July 29, 2011
- Conrad Marca-Relli. The Springs Years 1953 - 1956, essays by Carter Ratcliff 2011, Pollock-Krasner House and Study Center publisher, New York, 2011; exhibition: May 5 - July 29, 2011
- Conrad Marca-Relli. The Architecture of Action, essays by David Anfam and Kenneth Baker, Ronchini Gallery publisher, London, exhibition October 10 - November 24, 2012
- Conrad Marca-Relli. Reconsidered, Essay by William C. Agee, Hollis Taggart Galleries publisher, New York, 2016; Exhibition: January 21 - March 5, 2015, Hollis Taggart Galleries, New York ISBN 978-0-9889139-0-5

== Books ==
- Arnason, H. Harvard. Marca-Relli. New York: H. N. Abrams, 1963.
- Conrad Marca-Relli; Daniel Giralt-Miracle, (Barcelona: Ediciones Polígrafa, 1976); ISBN 84-343-0228-4, ISBN 978-84-343-0228-0; OCLC 2304947
- Marca-Relli 1976–1978, Santiago Amon, 1978. Publisher: Galeria Joan Prats, Barcelona.
- Conrad Marca-Relli; Luca Massimo Barbero ed.; Peggy Guggenheim Collection, Conrad Marca-Relli (Milano: Electa, ©1998) ISBN 0295978023/ISBN 9780295978024; OCLC 40848684
- Marca-Relli, Klaus Wolbert and Anja Hespelt, Mathildenhőhe Darmstadt, 2000 ISBN 3-9804553-8-6
- Marika Herskovic, New York School Abstract Expressionists Artists Choice by Artists, (New York School Press, 2000.) ISBN 0-9677994-0-6. pp. 8,12,16,25,37,234-37
- Marca-Relli, l'amico americano - sintonie e dissonanze con Afro e Burri, Marco Vallora 2002, Parma, Publisher: Galleria d'Arte Niccoli
- Marika Herskovic, American Abstract Expressionism of the 1950s An Illustrated Survey, (New York School Press, 2003.) ISBN 0-9677994-1-4. pp. 218–221
- Conrad Marca-Relli, first monograph and catalogue raisonné, essays by David Anfam, Magdalena Dabrowski and Marco Vallora, Museum S.r.l./Bruno Alfieri editore, Milano, 2008; ISBN 88-902804-2-5
- Marika Herskovic, American Abstract and Figurative Expressionism Style Is Timely Art Is Timeless (New York School Press, 2009); ISBN 978-0-9677994-2-1, pp. 156–59
