= Robert Proctor =

Robert Proctor may refer to:

- Robert Proctor (bibliographer) (1868–1903), English bibliographer
- Robert Proctor (field hockey) (born 1949), Australian field hockey player
- Robert N. Proctor (born 1954), American historian of science
- Bob Proctor (author) (1934–2022), Canadian self-help author

== See also ==
- Proctor (surname)
