= Tameka Norris =

American artist

T.J. Dedeaux-Norris
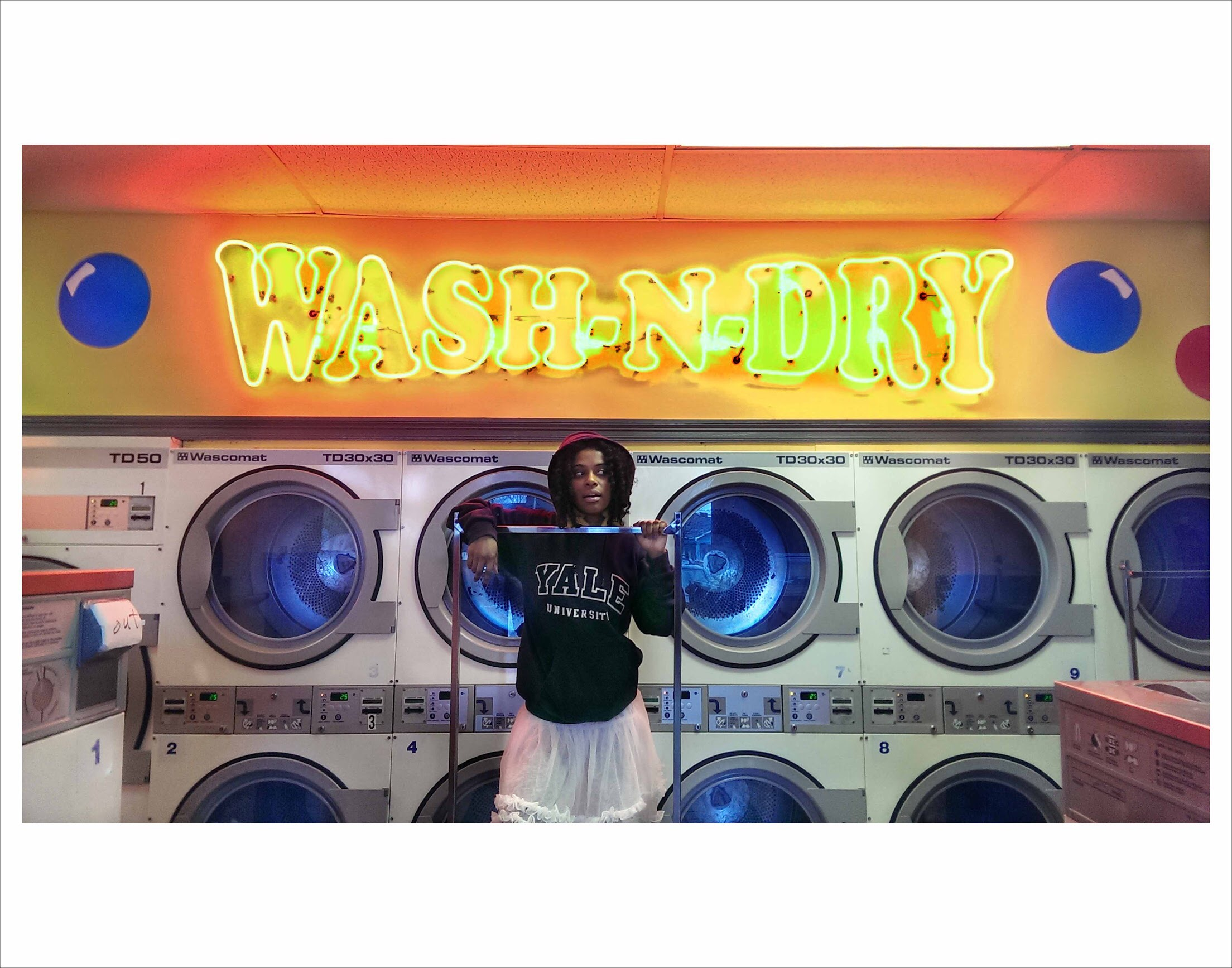
- Born: Hagåtña, Guam
- Education: UCLA School of the Arts and Architecture (2010); Yale School of Art (2012)
- Occupation: Artist
- Years active: 2002–present
- Website: mekajean.com

Tameka Norris, also known as T.J. Dedeaux-Norris and Meka Jean, is an American visual and performing artist. Norris uses painting, sculpture, and performance art to create work about racial identity and the simultaneous visibility and invisibility of blackness through cultural appropriation in modern society. Her work critiques the presence of the Black body in the history of painting and fine art.

== Early life and education ==
Born in Guam, Norris grew up in Gulfport, Mississippi. Following high school, in 1995, she moved to Los Angeles, where her biological father resided, initially to pursue a rap career.

She spent time working as a phone sex operator and music video extra before enrolling at Santa Monica College in Santa Monica, California. Norris was one of few Black students in the art program, where she studied for five years. In August 2005, Hurricane Katrina struck, impacting Norris's family back in Mississippi and also shaping her artwork. The images that she created during this period were included in the portfolio that she submitted to the UCLA School of the Arts and Architecture where she transferred in 2007. While at UCLA, she worked under the guidance of several influential faculty, including: Andrea Fraser, Mary Kelly, Barbara Kruger, Rodney McMillian, Cathy Opie, and Lari Pittman.

Norris went on to receive her Master of Fine Arts degree in printmaking and painting from Yale School of Art in 2012.

== Work and career ==
Norris is a tenured Associate Professor at the University of Iowa. She has studied at the Skowhegan School of Painting and Sculpture (2009) and has participated in many artist residencies, including the MacDowell Colony (2016) and The Fountainhead Residency. Norris was a Fellow at the Grant Wood Art Colony from 2016–2017, and in 2017, she received a $25,000 grant from the National Endowment of the Arts. She was awarded the 2026 Rome prize from the American Academy in Rome to create a three-part mixed-media art installation: an experimental biopic film series, a visual album, and an educational podcast series.

Norris was listed as one of "24 Artists to Watch in 2013" by Modern Painters magazine.

=== Performance art ===
In 2013 Norris was a part of a group exhibition and performance titled "Radical Presence: Black Performance in Contemporary Art" This exhibition, held at The Studio Museum in Harlem, was a view of performance art by Black Visual Artists over the past five decades, and featured over a dozen live performances over a six-month period. For this exhibition, Norris performed her 2012 work Untitled (2012). In this work, Norris paints a wall using her body as both the paint and the paintbrush. Norris runs a knife through a lemon, then cuts her tongue and while pressing her body against the wall uses the trail of blood and saliva to create a minimalist landscape on the gallery walls. The resulting effect is to disrupt the notions of a pristine white-cube gallery space, bringing up ideas of the body, violence, and pain. This exhibition was documented in Hyperallergic and the New York Times

=== Visual art ===
Norris's solo exhibitions include "Family Values" at the Contemporary Art Center in New Orleans in 2013, "Tameka Norris: Too Good For You (Introducing Meka Jean)" at the Lombard- Freid Gallery in 2014, "Almost Acquaintances" at the Ronchini Gallery in 2014, and "Not Acquiescing" at the 1708 Gallery in 2015.

In 2012 her work was included in the "MFA Annual" edition of New American Painting magazine, an anthology of MFA graduate work from more than a hundred colleges in the United States.

Her exhibition Between Bloodlines and Floodlines was shown at the Savannah College of Art and Design in Atlanta, Georgia in 2015.

=== Film ===
Her feature length-film Meka Jean: How She Got Good, is an internal investigation of identity and culture, starring the artist as herself in a search for identity, home, and what it means to be from New Orleans. This film was debuted during the international exhibition Prospect.3 New Orleans, and was presented as a multi-chambered installation at May Gallery, a nonprofit art space in New Orleans.

In 2011, Norris created a work of video art re-performing Bruce Nauman's 1967-68 work Walking in an Exaggerated Manor Around the Perimeter of a Square. This piece was shown in her 2013 "Family Values" exhibition at the Contemporary Art Center in New Orleans.

=== Music ===
In 2016 Norris released a conceptual rap album titled "Ivy League Ratchet" in conjunction with a four-person exhibition at the SVA Chelsea Gallery titled "The Beat Goes On". This album spoke about issues such as being a woman of color and attending an Ivy League school.

== Personal ==
Norris is alternately known as Meka Jean, a name given to her during childhood.
