= Thomas Proctor =

Thomas or Tom Proctor may refer to:

- Thomas Proctor (general) (1739–1806), American soldier and politician
- Thomas F. Proctor (born 1956), American trainer of Thoroughbred racehorses
- Tom Proctor (actor), American actor
- Tom Proctor (trade unionist) (1855–1925), British trade unionist and Labour Party politician
- Tom Proctor (footballer) (born 2009), English footballer
- Tom Proctor, a fictional character in the British television series The Bill

== See also ==
- Thomas R. Proctor High School, in Utica, New York
- Thomas R. Proctor Park, in Utica, New York
- Proctor (surname)
