= Jan Fabre =

Belgian artist, choreographer, designer, playwright, stage director

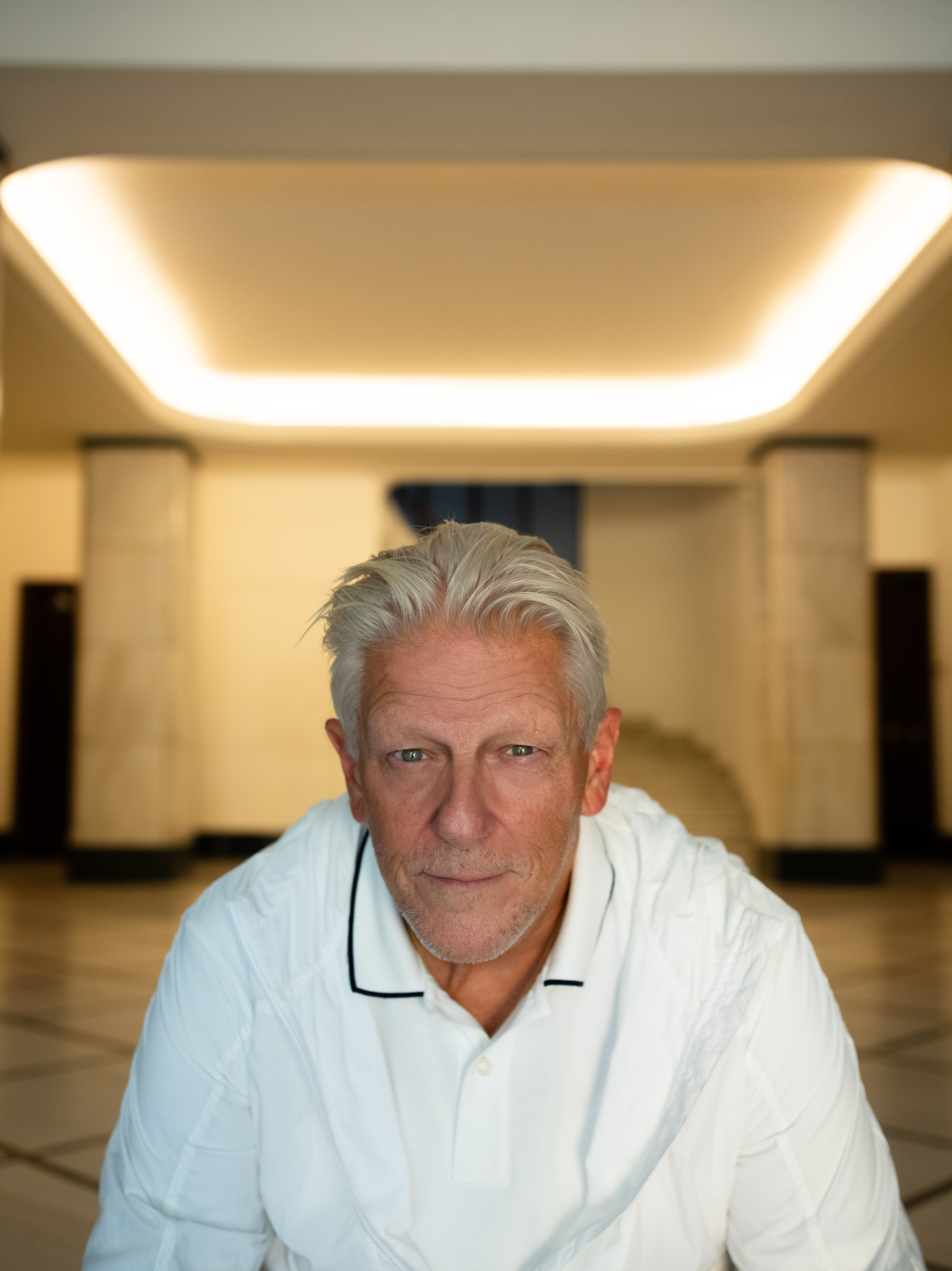
- Jan Fabre (center) in 2008
- Born: 14 December 1958 (age 67); Antwerp, Belgium

Jan Fabre (born 14 December 1958) is a Belgian artist known for his contributions to theater, literature, and visual arts. With a career spanning nearly four decades, Fabre has established himself as an influential figure in the artistic landscape.

== Consilience artist ==
Jan Fabre often refers to the concept of "consilience" – the unity of knowledge – a concept that was elaborated by William Whewell (1794–1866) and further developed by the American entomologist, biologist and philosopher Edward O. Wilson (1929–2021) in his book 1998 Consilience: The Unity of Knowledge.

Fabre describes himself as a consilience artist, explaining: "It’s a merging of elements from different disciplines guided by fact-based theory and practice across disciplines. An understanding of entomology can, for example, lead to new interpretations within the visual arts. Or vice versa – you see connections (For example across art, theatre, science, religion, medicine), you make new interpretations. This is consilience." Fabre identifies with this idea of consilience, taking a multifaceted and far-reaching approach. Thanks to this undertaking, Fabre offers fresh interpretations to the world of visual art, theatre and literature.

== Visual art ==
In his visual oeuvre, Fabre has developed a unique and coherent universe; a highly personal visual language with recurring symbols and motifs. Whilst studying in Antwerp at the Royal Academy of Fine Arts and the Municipal Institute for Decorative Arts and Crafts, where he "developed a profound love of beauty and its spiritual power". Curious by nature he became influenced by the manuscripts of entomologist Jean-Henri Fabre (1823–1915), he "became fascinated by the world of insects at a young age".

The iconic artworks featuring the iridescent wing-cases of the jewel beetle are an example of how Fabre wields metamorphosis as one of his driving forces. Thanks to its external skeleton and description in age-old mythologies, the jewel beetle has a long life, both physically and spiritually. The mosaic artworks in which the artist uses the wing shells as a base are also created to endure. Examples include in the ceiling installation ‘Heaven of Delight’ in Brussels’ Royal Palace (2002), in the three permanent altarpieces in AMUZ, the former St. Augustine's Church in Antwerp (2018), or the site-specific work ‘Tribute to a free spirit (2020) at the Fondation GGL Helenis, Montpellier.

The two series of mosaic panels ‘Tribute to Belgian Congo’ (2010-2013) and ‘Tribute to Hieronymus Bosch in Congo’ (2011-2013) are also made from the same wing-cases of the jewel beetle. With these works he addresses Belgium’s controversial history. They were first exhibited in their entirety at the PinchukArtCentre in Kiev (2013).

He wrote his first scripts for theatre between 1976 and 1980 and also did his first solo performances. During his 'money-performances', he burned money and wrote the word 'MONEY' with the ashes. In 1977, he renamed the street where he lived to "Jan Fabre Street" and fixed a commemorative plaque "Here lives and works Jan Fabre" to the house of his parents, analogous to the commemorative plate on the house of Vincent van Gogh in the same street. In 1978 he made drawings with his own blood during the solo performance 'My body, my blood, my landscape'. From 1980, Fabre began his career as a stage director and stage designer.

Fabre became known for his Bic-art (ballpoint drawings). In 1980, in 'The Bic-Art Room', he had himself locked up for three days and three nights in a white cube full of objects, drawing with blue "Bic" ballpoint pens as an alternative to "Big" art. In 1990 he covered an entire building with ballpoint drawings.

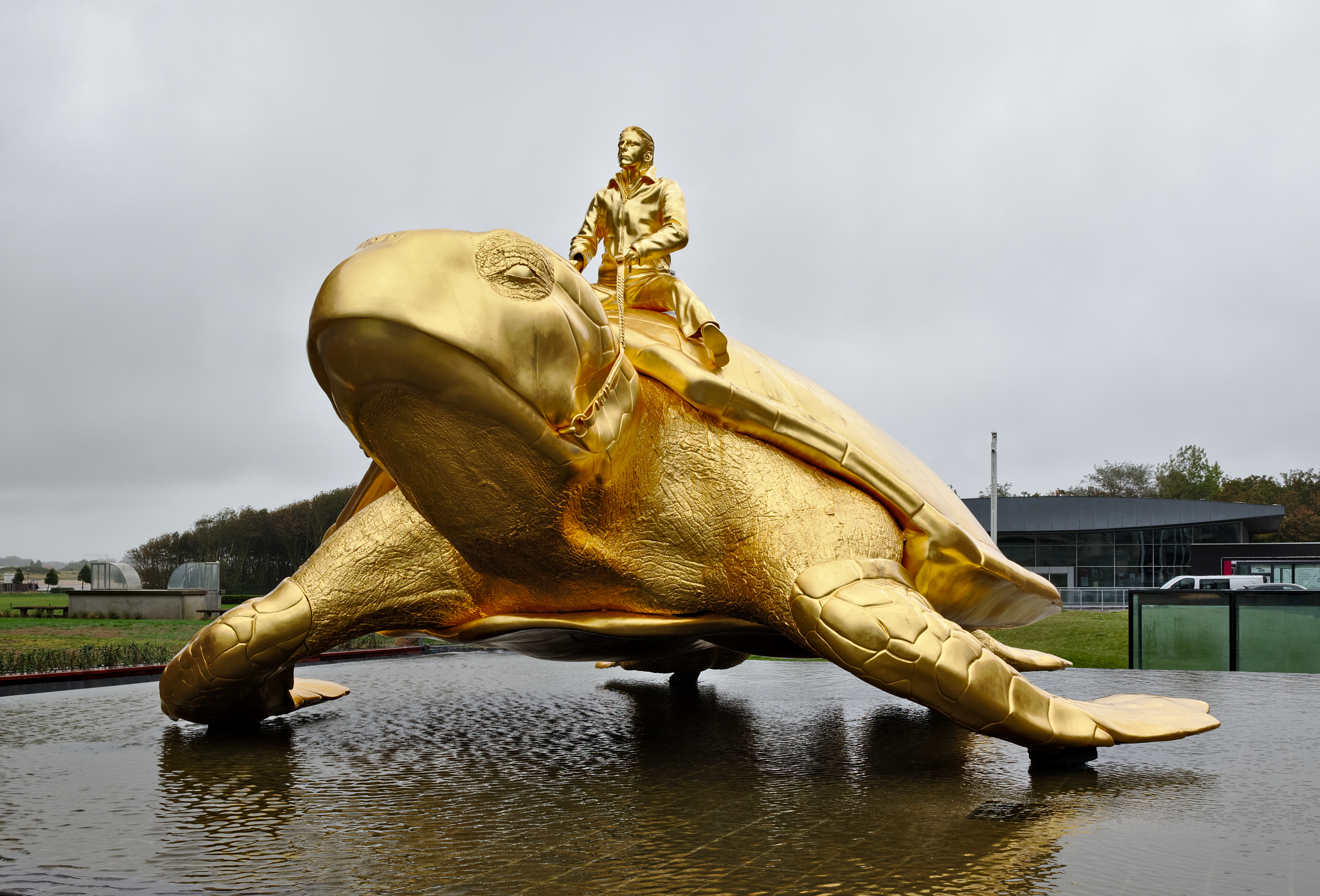
Searching for Utopia (Nieuwpoort)

Fabre also explored relationships between drawing and sculpture creating sculptures in bronze (among them The man who measures the clouds and Searching for Utopia) and with beetles. He decorated the ceiling of the Royal Palace in Brussels with one million six hundred thousand jewel-scarab wing cases for his work Heaven of Delight. In 2004 he erected Totem, a giant bug stuck on a 70-foot steel needle, on the Ladeuzeplein in Leuven (BE).

In September 2016, Fabre made an attempt to not break cyclist Eddy Merckx's 1972 hour record at the Tête d'Or Velodrome in Lyon. Fabre completed a total of 23 km in an hour, compared to Merckx's record of over 49 km. Merckx, fellow cyclist Raymond Poulidor, and veteran cycling commentator Daniel Mangeas commentated the event, which was performed as the opening of his "Stigmata" retrospective exhibition organised by the Musée d'art contemporain de Lyon. Fabre described the attempt as "how to remain a dwarf in the land of giants".

== Theatre ==
Jan Fabre makes a clean break with the conventions of contemporary theatre by introducing the concept of ‘real-time performance’ and explores radical possibilities as a means of resurrecting theatre and dance. Fabre has been writing his own plays since 1975. The acuteness and reserve with which he employs language demand innovative solutions which have also appeared at the hand of other directors who have worked with his texts.

In 1982, his production titled This is theatre as was to be expected and foreseen challenged established conventions within European theater circles, a trend that continued with subsequent works like The Power of Theatrical Madness performed at the Venice Biennale in 1984.

In 1986 he established the Troubleyn/Jan Fabre theatre company with extensive international operations; its home base is Antwerp, Belgium.

As a choreographer, Fabre explored innovative approaches to classical dance with pieces such as The Dance Sections (1987) and The Sound of One Hand Clapping (1990), for the Frankfurt Ballet. These choreographies served as precursors to the operatic trilogy The Minds of Helena Troubleyn which he created in collaboration with Polish composer Eugeniusz Knapik.

In 2005 Jan Fabre became artiste associé of the Festival d'Avignon. There he premièred Histoire des larmes at the Cour d’Honneur, a venue where he had previously presented Je suis sang in 2001. In 2007, Jan Fabre created Requiem für eine Metamorphose for the Felsenreitschule in Salzburg.

One of Jan Fabre's most well-known theatre works came in 2015 with Mount Olympus – To glorify the cult of tragedy (A 24-hour performance) a marathon production with 27 performers lasting a twenty-four-hour period that thematizes Greek tragedies. In 2023, with Peak Mytikas (On the top of Mount Olympus), an 8-hour production, Jan Fabre continues his research on the Greek tragedies, focusing on the house of Thebes, the tragedies of Oedipus and Antigone.

Throughout his career, Fabre has crafted numerous solo productions for key performers of the Troubleyn/Jan Fabre company. These solos are mostly based on his own texts. He made, among other works, for Els Deceukelier; Elle était et elle est, même (1991 & 2022) and Etant donnés (2004); for Ivana Jozić Angel of Death (2003) and Another Sleepy dusty delta day (2008); for Annabelle Chambon Preparatio mortis (2005 & 2010); for Antony Rizzi Drugs kept me alive (2012) and for Cédric Charron Attends, Attends, Attends… (Pour mon père). In 2019 he created Resurrexit Cassandra for Stella Höttler and Simona, the gangster of art with the Italian actress Irene Urciuoli.

Since 2016, Jan Fabre's production The Night Writer has been performed in several national theatres in Europe (Italy, Saint Petersburg, Belgrade, Vilnius, Ljubljana and Dubrovnik). The Night Writer is always performed by a known actor in their native language. The performance is based on Fabre's Night Diaries, that he has been writing since the beginning of his career and his stage texts. The Night Writer is the most awarded production from Jan Fabre's extensive body of work.

Jan Fabre's is included in the prestigious series The Great European Stage Directors (Methuen/Drama), supervised by the influential theatre historian Simon Shepherd. The series begins with Stanislavski and ends with Jan Fabre. The other two contemporaries included in the final volume of the eight-volume book series are Pina Bausch and Romeo Castellucci.

== Author ==
Jan Fabre is just as known for his theatre works and visual arts as he is for his theatre texts and Night Diaries. These have been translated into over 15 languages.

Fabre's theatre texts are primarily crafted for staging, characterized by conceptual depth and poetic expression. Drawing inspiration from ancient rituals and philosophical inquiries, they often serve as personal manifestos. Fabre advocates for a holistic approach to theatre, integrating elements such as dance, music, and improvisation alongside text to create immersive experiences. His minimalist use of language challenges traditional theatrical methods, offering opportunities for innovative interpretation by future directors.

In addition to his theatrical endeavours, Fabre has authored a series of Night Diaries since 1978. These succinct daily entries provide insight into his artistic journey, evolving perspectives, and unwavering commitment to beauty. The Night Diaries offer readers a glimpse into Fabre's creative processes and philosophical musings, capturing the process of his artistic evolution.

== Conviction ==
In September 2018, twenty former members of Fabre's performing arts company, Troubleyn/Jan Fabre (Antwerp, Belgium) accused him of sexual harassment, abuse of power, and assault. These accusations strongly diminished Fabre's standing in the artistic community.

On 29 April 2022, Jan Fabre was sentenced by a Belgian court to 18 months (without imprisonment) for 5 "violations of the law on the welfare of workers" and, in the case of a woman, of "assault on decency" (i.e. assault for a kiss 'with the tongue'). While Jan Fabre did not appeal his conviction, 175 former employees and colleagues have sided with the artist/theatre-maker and spoken out about what they viewed as an incorrect portrayal of Fabre.

== Controversy ==
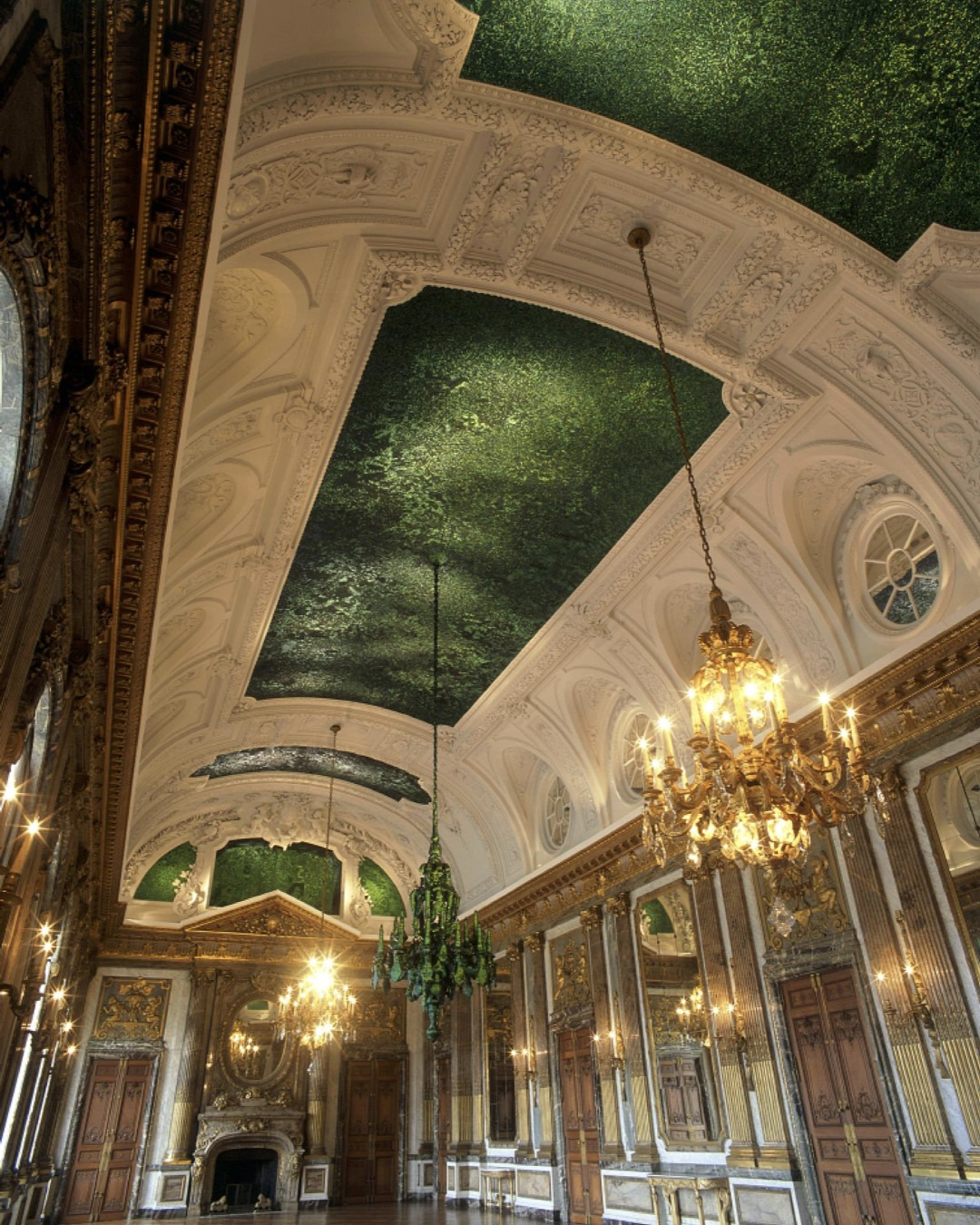
The heaven of delight inside the Hall of Mirrors of the Royal palace, a part can be seen above the fireplace.

On 26 October 2012, several media outlets reported on a shoot in the Antwerp town hall for a forthcoming film exploring Jan Fabre's artistic practice, living cats were thrown into the air, after which they made a landing on the steps of the entrance hall (which was covered in a protective layer). The owner of the cats and vet was present during the filming. Later that day, Fabre claimed all cats were still in good health.

Then in February 2016, Jan Fabre was appointed by the Greek Ministry of Culture as the Creative Director of the annual Athens – Epidaurus Festival. He resigned less than two months later, on 2 April 2016, after controversy over his plan to turn Greece's major arts festival into "a tribute to Belgium" and devote eight of the festival's ten productions to those from his homeland.

In October 2016, the Russian State Hermitage museum staged a Fabre exhibition which drew a lot of criticism from visitors and institutions such as the Russian Orthodox Church. Stuffed animals in strange poses sparked outcry among Russian social media network users who launched a campaign under the hashtag #позорэрмитажу, or "Shame on you, Hermitage". The museum then organized an event to meet the public and explain the exhibition. The artist confirmed that the animals used were taken from roads where they had been killed and denied any accusations by critics of cruelty.

"The animals featured in this installation were found near Antwerp, because many people in Belgium, Holland and France buy dogs and then abandon them on the street during the summer and so they are killed. This installation is essentially a kind of a homage to these animals...I think this exhibition also talks about the power and the force and the vulnerability of humankind and animals." – Jan Fabre

== Exhibitions ==
- The Angel of Metamorphosis exhibition, Louvre Museum (2008)
- Tribute to Hieronymus Bosch in Congo (2011 – 2013). Jan Fabre. Tribute to Belgian Congo (2010 – 2013), Galerie Daniel Templon, Paris (2015)
- Facing Time. Rops / Fabre, Musée Félicien Rops, La Maison de la Culture; Saint-Loup Church, Namur (cat.) (2015)
- Tribute to Hieronymus Bosch in Congo (2011 – 2013), Wetterling Gallery, Stockholm (2015)
- The Lime Twig Man, At the Gallery, Antwerp (2015)
- Stigmata. Actions & Performances 1976–2013, M HKA, Antwerp (cat.) (2015)
- Tribute to Hieronymus Bosch in Congo, Espace Louis Vuitton, Tokyo (cat.) (2015)
- Knight of the Night, Galeria Il Ponte, Florence (cat.) (2015)
- The Years of the Hour Blue, Magazzino, Rome (2015)
- Jan Fabre. 30 Years / 7 Rooms, Deweer Gallery, Otegem (2015)
- Sacrum Cerebrum, Art Bärtschi & Cie, Geneva (2015)
- The Man Who Bears the Cross, At the Gallery, Antwerp (2015)
- Sacrum Cerebrum, BRAFA, Brussels (2016)
- Knight of the Night, Ronchini Gallery, London (cat.) (2016)
- Spiritual Guards, Forte Belvedere; Piazza della Signoria; Palazzo Vecchio, Florence (cat.) (2016)
- Vanitas Vanitatum, Omnia Vanitas, Deweer Gallery, Otegem (2016)
- Tribute to Hieronymus Bosch in Congo, Het Noordbrabants Museum, ‘s Hertogenbosch (2016)
- Falsification de la fête secrète IV (Carnival), Guy Pieters Gallery, Knokke-Heist (2016)
- Stigmata. Actions & Performances 1976-2016, MAC, Lyon (cat.) (2016)
- Knight of Despair / Warrior of Beauty, The State Hermitage Museum, St. Petersburg (cat.) (2016)
- Glass and Bone Sculptures 1977 – 2017, L’Abbazia di San Gregorio, Venice (cat.) (2017)
- Gold and Blood (Sculptures and Drawings), Art Bärtschi & Cie, Geneva (2017)
- My Only Nation is Imagination, Studio Trisorio; Madre Museum; Capodimonte Museum, Naples (cat.) (2017)
- Stigmata. Actions & Performances 1979-2016, Leopold Museum, Vienna (2017)
- Viewing Boxes, Thinking Models and Drawings 1977-2008, Deweer Gallery, Otegem (2017)
- Maskers, Magazzino, Rome (2017)
- Stigmata. Actions & Performances 1976-2016, Centro Andaluz de Arte Contemporáneo (CAAC), Sevilla (2018)
- The Appearance and Disappearance of Bacchus / Antwerp / Christ (2016), Special Creations for The State Hermitage Museum, Galerie Templon, Brussels (2018)
- My Queens, Royal Museums of Fine Arts of Belgium, Brussels (cat.) (2018)
- Folklore sexuel belge (2017-2018) et Mer du Nord sexuelle belge (2018), édité et offert par Jan Fabre, le bon artiste Belge, Galerie Templon (Grenier Saint-Lazare), Paris (2018)
- Ma nation: l’imagination, Fondation Maeght, Saint-Paul-de-Vence (cat.) (2018)
- Ecstasy & Oracles, Arco delle Valle dei Templi; Biblioteca Lucchediana; Santa Maria dei Greci and Museo Archeologico Regionale Pietro Griffo; Cappella Chiaramontana del Complesso Monumentale Santo Spirito; Cattedrale di Santa Maria Nuova di Monreale; Chiostro di Santa Maria Nuova ed ex Dormitorio dei Benedettini di Monreale (2018)
- Jan Fabre – Curated by BOZAR. A cutting experience, located on the beach in front of the casino, Knokke-Heist (2018)
- The Castles in the Hour Blue, Building Gallery; Sant’ Eustorgio Cathedral and Portinari Chapel, Milan (2018)
- Loyalty and Vanity, Gallery 604 & Project B6, Busan (2018/2019)
- There is no escape from art, Sofia Arsenal – Museum of Contemporary Art, Sofia (2018/2019)
- Oro Rosso. Gold and coral sculptures, blood drawings, Museum and Real Bosco di Capodimonte (cat.) (2018/2019)
- The Man Who Measures the Clouds, Museo Madre, Naples (2018/2019)
- The Man Who Bears the Cross, Pio Monte della Misericordia, Naples (2018/2019)
- Tribute to Hieronymus Bosch in Congo, Studio Trisorio, Naples (2018/2019)
- The Man Who Measures the Clouds (Monument to the Measure of the Immeasurable), Canal Grande, during 58. Biennale di Venezia, Venice (cat.) (2018/2019)
- Le garçon qui porte la lune et les étoiles sur sa tête, Fondation Linda et Guy Pieters, Saint-Tropez
- The Rhythm of the Brain, Palazzo Merulana, Rome
- L’Heure Sauvage, Galerie Templon, Brussel (2020)
- Feast of Little Friends, National Museum Belgrade in collaboration with Cultural Centre, Belgrade (2020)
- L’Heure Bleue, Musée des Beaux Arts, Arras (2020)
- Purity on its knees, Pilevneli Gallery, Istanbul (2021)
- The Shape of Gold. A Devilish Ashtray, Building Box, Milan (2021)
- Collage-drawing for The Purity of Mercy IV, II (2019), Studio Trisorio, Napoli (2021)
- Project wall: ‘Avant grade’ (2011), Tribute to Belgium Congo 2010 – 2013, Studio Trisorio, Capri (2022)
- Homo aquaticus and his planet, Certosa di San Giacomo, Capri (2022)
- Allegory of caritas (An act of love), Mucciaccia Gallery, London & Rome (2022)
- Jan Fabre, Dream Castles (Drawings And Photographs), Mucciaccia Gallery, Cortina d’Ampezzo (2023)
- Jan Fabre. La saggezza del Belgio | Jan Fabre. The Wisdom of Belgium, Galleria Gaburro, Milan (2023)
- Allegory of caritas (An act of love), Mucciaccia Gallery, Singapore (2023)
- Per Eusebia, Laura e Joanna, Studio Trisorio, Napoli (2023)
- Jan Fabre, New Works, Mosaics, Wilde Gallery, Basel (2023)

== Theatre productions ==
- Theater geschreven met een K is een kater (1980)
- Het is theater zoals te verwachten en te voorzien was ("It is Theatre as to be Expected and Foreseen" (1982)
- De macht der theaterlijke dwaasheden ("The power of theatrical madness", Venice Biennale 1984)
- Das Glas im Kopf wird vom Glas (1987)
- Prometheus Landschaft (1988)
- Das Interview das stirbt... (1989)
- Der Palast um vier Uhr morgens... A.G. (1989)
- Die Reinkarnation Gottes (1989)
- Das Glas im Kopf wird vom Glas (1990)
- The Sound of one hand clapping (1990)
- Sweet Temptations (1991)
- She was and she is, even (1991)
- Wie spreekt mijn gedachte ... (1992)
- Silent Screams, Difficult Dreams (1992)
- Vervalsing zoals ze is, onvervalst (1992)
- Da un’altra faccia del tempo (1993)
- Quando la terra si rimette in movimento (1995)
- Three Dance-solos (1995)
- A dead normal woman (1995)
- Universal Copyrights 1 & 9 (1995)
- De keizer van het verlies (1996)
- The very seat of honour (1997)
- Body, Body on the wall (1997)
- Glowing Icons (1997)
- The Pick-wick-man (1997)
- Ik ben jaloers op elke zee… (1997)
- The fin comes a little bit earlier this siècle (But business as usual) (1998)
- Het nut van de nacht (1999)
- As long as the world needs a warrior’s soul (2000)
- My movements are alone like streetdogs (2000)
- Je suis Sang (conte de fées médiéval) (2001)
- Het zwanenmeer (2002)
- Swan lake (2002)
- Parrots & guinea pigs (2002)
- Je suis sang (2003)
- Angel of death (2003)
- Tannhäuser (co-production) (2004)
- Elle était et elle est, même (2004)
- Etant donnés (2004)
- Quando L'Uomo principale è una donna (2004)
- The crying body (2004)
- The King of Plagiarism (2005)
- History of Tears (2005)
- I am a Mistake (2007)
- Requiem für eine Metamorphose (2007)
- Another Sleepy Dusty Delta Day (2008)
- Orgy of Tolerance (2009)
- The Servant of Beauty (2010)
- Preparatio Mortis (2010)
- Prometheus–Landscape II (2011)
- Drugs kept me alive (2012)
- Tragedy of a Friendship (2013)
- Attends, Attends, Attends... (Pour mon Père) (2014)
- Mount Olympus. To Glorify the Cult of Tragedy. A 24-hour performance. (2015)
- Belgium Rules/Belgian Rules, together with Johan de Boose (2017)
- The Generosity of Dorcas (2018)
- The Night Writer - Italy (2019)
- Resurrexit Cassandra (2019)
- The Night Writer - Russia (2019)
- The Night Writer - Serbia | Nocni Pisac (2020)
- The Night Writer - Lithuania | Nakties Rasytojas (2021)
- The Fluid Force of Love (2021)
- The Night Writer - Slovenia | Nocni Pisec (2021)
- The Night Writer - Croatia | Nocni Pisac (2021)
- Resurrexit Cassandra (with Sonia Bergamasco) (2021)
- Not Once (An art installation with film - featuring Mikhail Baryshnikov) (2021)
- Elle etait et elle est, meme (2022)
- Simona, the gangster of art (2023)
- Peak Mytikas (On the top of Mount Olympus) An 8-Hour Performance, together with Johan de Boose (2023)
- Io sono un errore / I am a mistake (2024)
- I'm sorry (2024)
- I believe in the legend of love (2024)
- Una tribù, ecco quello che sono / A Tribe, That Is Me (2025)
- La poésie de la résistance / The Poetry of Resistance (2025)
