= William Procter =

William Procter may refer to:

- William Procter (industrialist) (1801–1884), co-founder of Procter & Gamble
- William Cooper Procter (1862–1934), grandson of William Procter and head of Procter & Gamble from 1907 to 1930
- William Procter (Canadian veteran) (1899–2005), one of the last Canadian veterans of World War I to die
- William Procter Jr. (1817–1874), American pharmacist

== See also ==
- William Proctor (disambiguation)
