= Joseph Proctor (disambiguation) =

Joseph Proctor was an actor.

Joseph Proctor may also refer to:

- Joe Proctor (born 1985), American mixed martial artist
- Joseph Proctor (academic) (died 1845), academic of the University of Cambridge

== See also ==
- Joe Procter (1906–1989), New Zealand rugby union player
- Proctor (surname)
