= David Proctor =

David Proctor may refer to:

- David Proctor (footballer, born 1984), Scottish football player and coach
- David Proctor (footballer, born 1929), Northern Irish footballer
- David Proctor (admiral), officer in the Royal New Zealand Navy
- R. David Proctor (born 1960), United States judge

== See also ==
- Proctor (surname)
