= Adrien Broom =

American photographer

- Born: 1980 (age 45–46)
- Education: Northeastern University
- Known for: Photography

Adrien Broom is a contemporary fine art and commercial photographer from Connecticut. Broom's fine art photography often alludes to themes of childhood fantasy, with young women as the protagonists. Her commercial work includes fashion and portrait photography.

== Biography ==
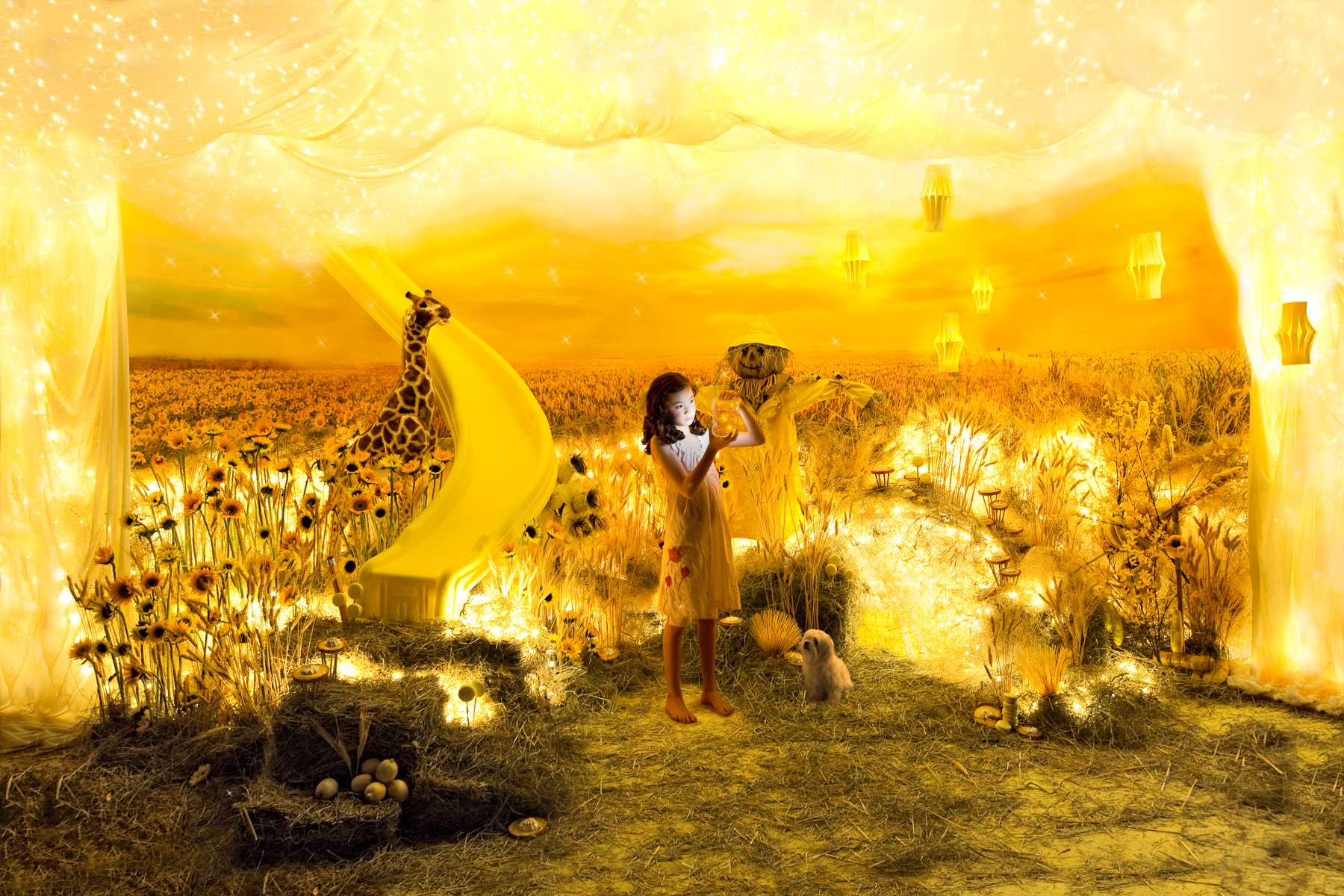
Yellow, 2015, photograph by Adrien Broom.

Broom received a bachelor's degree in computer animation from Northeastern University, studied fine art in Florence, Italy at Studio Art Centers International (SACI), and art history in the Christie's Education program in London. Citing childhood memories as an important catalyst, she makes use of period costumes to compose images that are often derived from fairy tales, but "It's a little darker than my reality as a child, drawing on my adult vision of the beautiful and bizarre." When composing fantasy-based scenarios on a miniature scale, Broom constructs sets in her studio using malleable and found objects. A current project continues to draw from the interest in fairy tale imagery, with the exploration of color as a unifying theme. As part of her commercial assignments, Broom regularly photographed Grace Potter and the Nocturnals.

Broom's photographs have been featured in numerous exhibitions in Connecticut and New York City, as well as in the American Dreamers exhibition at the Palazzo Strozzi in Florence in 2012. For art historian Roderick Conway Morris, Broom's photographs of ethereal female figures include references to Pre-Raphaelite art, Baroque sculpture and Symbolism. Bartholomew Bland, Director of Curatorial Affairs at the Hudson River Museum, writes that "through the use of photography, Broom cleverly conceals from us her meticulous craftsmanship....in Broom's (work) it is easy to forget that many of the most dramatic effects are created by hand." In her miniature dioramas, Broom uses both overt narrative and enigmatic imagery, with references to classical art as well as existential literature.

Working at Erector Square in New Haven, Broom often supplements her studio's ample natural light with artificial illumination. Her work entails three distinct components: the building of sets, the photographic shoot itself and the subsequent editing of images. According to Broom, the construction of a set takes between one and three weeks. "My sets take a while to build, and renting a space per project just wouldn’t make sense."

In 2015, Broom's photographs and installations were the subject of an exhibition at the Hudson River Museum. In 2016, Broom's photographs on the grounds of the Florence Griswold Museum were exhibited in a group show there. Her photographs were also the subject of a solo show at the Lyman Allyn Art Museum. For a series of works in 2016, Broom designed a specially illuminated dress for a model she photographed in the vast interior of Wentworth Woodhouse. Broom's photographs on the grounds of the Griswold Museum and Wentworth House are part of a larger series inspired by Wentworth, Holding Space: Historic Homes Project, which has also included photographs taken at the Mark Twain House and on the Fishers Island Ferry. Broom has been assisted in this project by the National Trust for Historic Preservation, and has cited the importance of preparation for the narratives she develops; three months of research on Mark Twain's life preceded her work at the Twain house. In the end, the Twain series focused primarily on the author's wife and daughters. Broom has planned further shoots for the series at other historic residences, including Gillette Castle State Park, the Pollock-Krasner House and Study Center and the Alice Austen House.

== Accolades ==
In 2019, she was listed among the 40 Under 40 List put out by Connecticut Magazine.

== Sources ==
- Bland, Bartholomew. Dream No Small Dreams: The Miniature Worlds of Adrien Broom, Thomas Doyle and Patrick Jacobs, Ronchini Gallery, London, 2013. ISBN 978-1-62890-050-7
- Barry, Amy J. "Reality with a Twist", Grace Magazine, The Day, February 16, 2011
- Barry, Amy J. "Activating the Playful Side of the Brain", The Day, January 6, 2011
- Centre for Contemporary Culture at Palazzo Strozzi
- "Lyme's Adrien Broom exhibits in Italy", The Day, April 8, 2012
- Barry, Amy J. "Adrien Broom's current project thrives in living color". The Day, April 7, 2013
- Pantovich, Mila. "Ultra Talented Artist Adrien Broom Takes a Moment to Tell Us About Just What Fuels Her Curious Worlds", JustLuxe, April 28, 2014
