= Andy Proctor =

Senior sports lecturer, English RL coach and former rugby league footballer

Personal information
- Full name: Andrew Proctor
- Born: 9 March 1969 (age 56)

Playing information
- Position: Second-row
Club
Years	Team	Pld	T	G	FG	P
1996–98	Wakefield Trinity Wildcats	45	5	0	0	20
2000–02	Oldham RLFC	22	2	0	0	8
	Total	67	7	0	0	28

Coaching information
Representative
Years	Team	Gms	W	D	L	W%
2019–	Serbia	1	0	0	1	0
- As of 14 November 2023

Andrew Proctor is a former professional rugby league footballer who played in the 1990s. He played at club level for Wakefield Trinity Wildcats, as a second-row.

Andy is a senior lecturer at UCLAN's Burnley campus in the School of Sport and Health Sciences, mainly responsible for football coaching, specialising in high performance related modules, and in 2019 taken over as head coach of the Serbia national rugby league team.
