= Samuel Zealey =

British sculptor

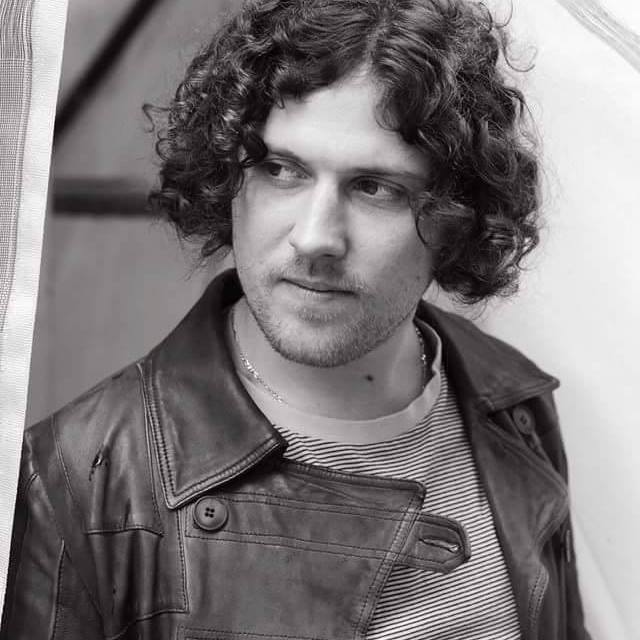
- Samuel Zealey
- Born: 1986 (age 39–40); East Dulwich
- Education: Wimbledon College of Arts, Royal College of Art, Royal British Society of Sculptors
- Known for: Public art, sculpture
- Notable work: The Integrity of Fertility
- Website: SamuelZealey.com

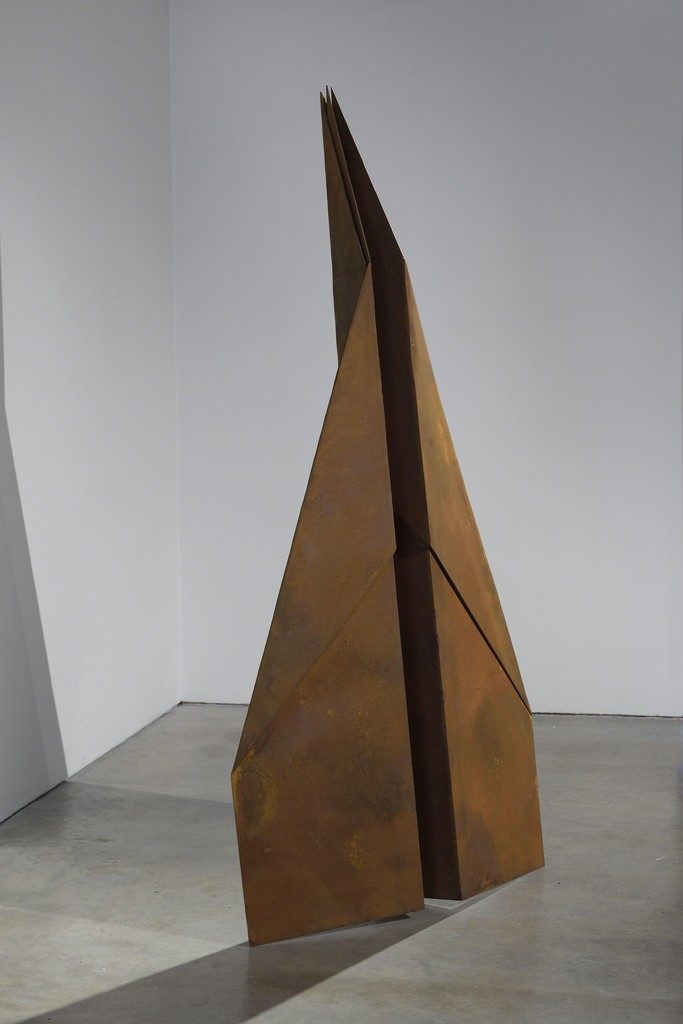
Cob Gallery, London (UK) solo exhibition

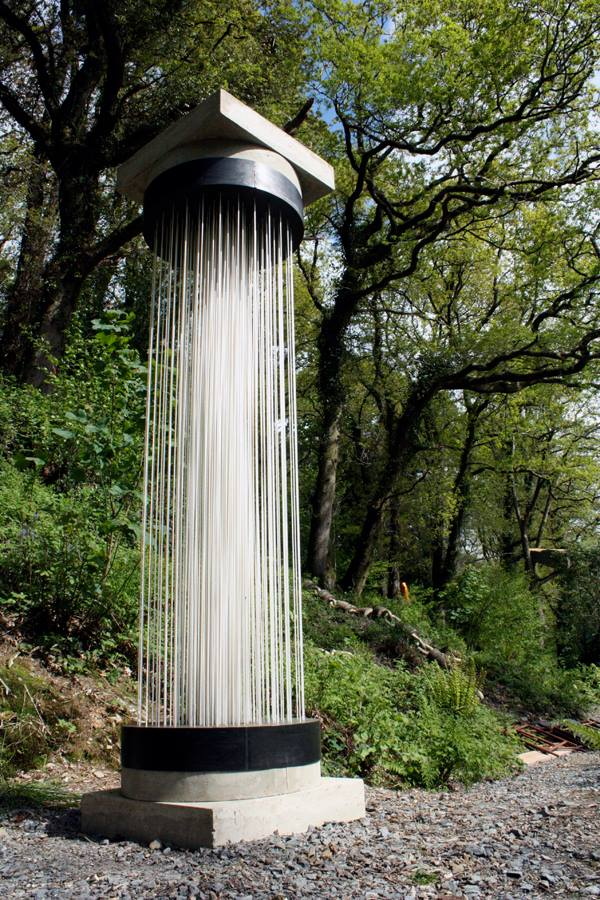
Broomhill National Sculpture

Samuel Zealey (born 1986) is a British sculptor known for creating permanent public artworks.

== Education ==
Zealey graduated from Wimbledon College of Arts in 2008, and then established his studio in Essex. He went on to complete his MA in sculpture from the Royal College of Art under professor Richard Wentworth., and became a member of the Royal British Society of Sculptors. He went on to study sculpture at the Royal College of Art graduating in June 2012.

== Career ==
Whilst studying at Wimbledon College of Arts, Zealey worked as a studio technician for Richard Wilson. Soon after completing his BA he was selected as a finalist for BBC TVs School of Saatchi. He has quoted his influences as people such as Isambard Kingdom Brunel and Joseph Bazalgette.

Zealey's works can be found throughout the UK. In 2013 his piece Myriad won the Broomhill National Sculpture Prize In 2015 he was announced as the winner of the Gateway Public Art Commission, which was set up to find a piece of artwork to display on the roundabout outside Bracknell's train station. His work, Onyo, was described by voters as 'original', 'striking' and 'pioneering'. Onyo is the West African word for 'precarious'. The sculpture is constructed of precariously stacked blocks, bearing a resemblance to the game Jenga.

He also has expressed interest in the environment, and a desire to find sculptural ways to combat global warming.

Zealey was listed as Top 10 – Artists Under 30 by Artlyst.

In 2012 he won the Deutsche Bank Award for Creative Enterprises (RCA), and in 2014 his piece Helix won Spitalfields Public Sculpture Commission Award.

== Exhibition Highlights ==
- 2008 Saatchi's Fifteen at the Concrete and Glass Festival, London, UK
- 2009 Sudley Castle Sculpture Park Commission, Gloucestershire, UK
- 2009 Don't raise the bridge lower the river, at the Saatchi Gallery, London, UK
- 2010 murmurART an introduction, 20 Hoxton Square, London, UK
- 2012 FABRICATORS, Hannah Barry Gallery, Peckham, London, UK
- 2013 Dividing Lines, High House Gallery, Oxfordshire, UK
- 2013 REX (solo), Tim Sheward Projects, London, UK
- 2013 Disappearance, NAM Project, Milan, Italy
- 2014 Samuel Zealey – Young local artist (solo), Merry Meade House and Estate, Brentwood, UK
- 2014 Face Time, Threadneedle Space, Mall Galleries, ICA, London, UK
- 2015 Everything Must Go (solo), William Benington Gallery, London, UK
- 2017 PLANES (solo), Cob Gallery, London, UK
