= John Proctor (inventor) =

American inventor

John Proctor was born in 1804 to the town of Andover, New Hampshire's village blacksmith. He left town in 1822, at the age of 18, only to return three decades later to revive the town. Proctor Academy is named in his honor.

William John Proctor (twin) was born on 19 August 1847 in Bristol, in Grafton County, New Hampshire. He died on 4 Oct 1847 at Andover, Merrimack County, New Hampshire.
