= Henry Procter =

Henry Procter or Proctor may refer to:

- Henry Procter (politician) (1883–1955), British politician
- Henry H. Proctor (1868–1933), minister of the First Congregational Church (Atlanta)
- Henry Proctor (rower) (1929–2005), American rower
- Henry Procter (British Army officer) (1763–1822)
