= George Willis Proctor =

Florida state legislator (born c. 1848)

George Willis Proctor (born August 8, 1848) was an American farmer and state legislator in Florida. An African American, he represented Jefferson County, Florida for one term in the 1883 legislature, while his brother John E. Proctor served as a state senator.

He was born in Tallahassee August 8, 1848. He owned 180 acres of land.
