= Philip Bridger Proctor =

British civil servant

Sir Philip Bridger Proctor KBE (1870 - 3 December 1940) was a British businessman who served as Director of Meat Supplies, Ministry of Food, 1919–21. For his wartime service, he was knighted in 1920.

He was educated at St Paul's School. He married Nellie Eliza Shaul in 1897; they had one daughter and one son, Sir Dennis Proctor.
