= William Procter (Canadian veteran) =

Canadian veteran

William "Duke" Procter (August 18, 1899 – December 14, 2005) was a Canadian veteran of the First World War and the last remaining veteran of that war from western Canada. At the time of his death, there were only three known remaining Canadian World War I veterans, two of which lived in the U.S.

He was born in Mabel Lake, British Columbia, where he learned at an early age how to drive horses and haul wood. He joined the Canadian Army in 1916, went to England as a member of the 172nd Rocky Mountain Rangers Infantry and was put to work cutting timber in Scotland for use on the front lines in France because, at 16, he was considered too young for active duty. After his discharge, he returned to Mabel Lake, where he continued to work at logging while ultimately settling on a farm and raising three sons with his wife, Clara (née Sigalet). After his retirement at the age of 67, he moved to Vernon, British Columbia. Procter held the record as being the oldest person ever to compete in the Canadian Horseshoe Championships, participating in 1997 and 1998, after taking up the game in earnest at 75. He celebrated his 100th birthday by skydiving at 100 years and 39 days. Procter continued to drive his 1967 Plymouth until the age of 101. He bowled until 105, still getting strikes at 104. He also square-danced until 104 before moving into a senior's home at 105 after a fall left him less mobile.

Procter received the Queen's Golden Jubilee Medal in 2004.

He died at Oakside Manor residential care facility in Enderby, British Columbia at the age of 106.
