= Michael Proctor =

Michael Proctor may refer to:

- Michael Proctor (footballer) (born 1980), English footballer
- Michael Proctor (academic) (born 1950), British physicist
- Michael Proctor (gridiron football) (1967–2026), American football player
- Michael Proctor (botanist) (1929–2017), English botanist/ecologist

== See also ==
- Mike Procter (1946–2024), South African cricketer
