= John Procter =

John Procter may refer to:

- John Procter (politician) (born 1966), British politician
- John Robert Procter (1844–1933), American geologist
- John Procter, musician in I, Ludicrous
- John Procter, see List of Grand National winners

== See also ==
- John Proctor (disambiguation)
