= Berndnaut Smilde =

Dutch visual artist (born 1978)

Berndnaut Smilde (Groningen, 1978) is a Dutch visual artist.

== Early life ==
Berndnaut Smilde was born in 1978 in Groningen. In 2005, Smilde graduated with a master's degree in fine art from the Frank Mohr Institute of Hanze University in Groningen.

== Career ==
Smilde's best known works include the series Conditioner; sculptures that spread an antiseptic scent throughout several rooms, and Unflattened, which shows an inverted rainbow.

I see them as temporary sculptures of almost nothing — the edge of materiality. It looks like you can dive into them or grab them, but they just fall apart. There's a duality there that I really like, where you're trying to achieve this ideal thing that then just collapses moments later.

— Smilde in an interview with IGNANT

In 2012 he created a series of self-made clouds, of which Nimbus II, 2012, first performed in the Lady Chapel of Hoorn, was included in London's Saatchi Gallery. He chooses locations that are old, damp, that have no air circulation. Time magazine called this technique one of the fifty best inventions of 2012.

In a collaboration with the photographer Simon Procter Smilde signature manufactured cloudscapes with fashion luminaries Karl Lagerfeld, Dolce & Gabbana, Donatella Versace and Alber Elbaz. The pictures appeared in feature in the September 2013 issue "ICONOCLOUDS" of Harper's Bazaar U.S.

== Exhibitions ==
- Process Room (2008)
- Irish Museum of Modern Art (2008)
- Bunker Project (2010)
- Galerie West (2010)
- The Hague (2010)
- Bonnefantenmuseum, Maastricht (2013)
- Ronchini Gallery, London (2014)
- LIAN Contemporary Art Space, Shanghai (2015)

=== Group shows ===
- Galerie Boven de Bank (2001)
- Groningen (2001)
- Nofound Photo Fair, Paris (2012)
- Saatchi Gallery, London, (2012)
- Art 13, London (2013)
- Somarts, San Francisco (2013)
- FotoMuseum, Antwerp, (2015)
- Museum Kranenburgh, (2016)
- RWA Bristol, (2017)
- Saatchi Gallery, London (2017)

== Awards ==
Smilde won a stipend from the Netherlands Foundation for Visual Arts.
