= Arthur Procter =

Arthur Procter may refer to:

- Arthur Herbert Procter (1890–1973), English recipient of the Victoria Cross
- Arthur Thomas Procter (1886–1964), lawyer, judge and politician in Saskatchewan, Canada
