= James D. Proctor =

American geographer (born 1957)

Jim Proctor
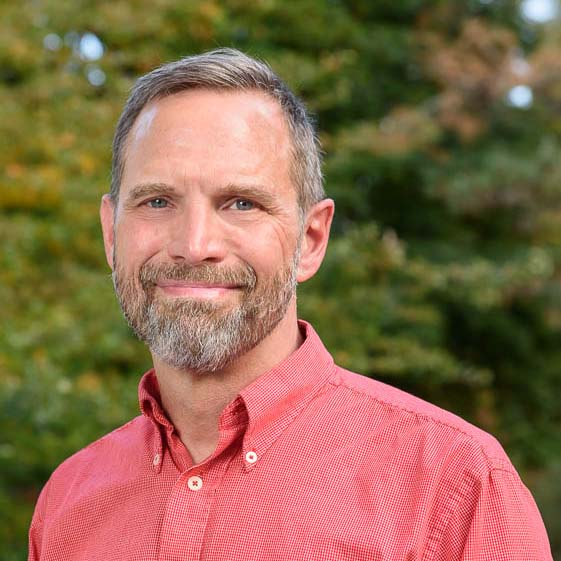
- Born: December 27, 1957 (age 67); Canyonville, Oregon, U.S.
- Education: University of Oregon; University of New Mexico; UC Berkeley (PhD)
- Occupation(s): Professor Environmental Studies, Lewis and Clark College

James "Jim" D. Proctor (born December 27, 1957) is an American geographer, the author and editor of numerous books and articles, and professor of environmental studies at Lewis and Clark College in Portland, Oregon (2005–2016). Before coming to Lewis and Clark College, he taught in the department of geography at the University of California, Santa Barbara (1992–2005). In 2002, Proctor founded the Alder Creek Community Forest educational nonprofit in his birthplace of Canyonville, Oregon. Proctor is also a senior fellow at the Breakthrough Institute.

== Career ==
Proctor's scholarship in environmental theory has gone through three main phases. Following his PhD thesis on the ethics and ideology of the Pacific Northwest spotted owl debate, Proctor primarily published on concepts of nature in contemporary American environmentalism. He next explored science and religion, again in the context of human/biophysical nature and recent environmental movements. Since 2010, Proctor has published in conjunction with his work in environmental studies, including theory, pedagogy, and how they benefit from environmental engagement across ideological difference.

Proctor is known as a critic of many key concepts that inform contemporary American environmentalism, including nature, sustainability, and even environment—"...at least in the sense that environment is generally understood today." His approach could be called "post-naturalism," especially as articulated via the longtime influence of Bruno Latour, in works such as Politics of Nature and We Have Never Been Modern. As with Latour, Proctor's post-naturalism is less a rejection of environmental concern than a repudiation of certain binary assumptions it has inherited from modernity ("counting to two"), as well as common holistic solutions that deny difference ("counting to one"), or naive celebration of difference ("counting beyond two"). Proctor's publications replace these options with "counting beneath two," involving more dynamic, relational approaches to nature and environment that accept a plurality of understandings but search for deep difference.

Similarly, in response to increasing polarization in the U.S., Proctor has published on environmental engagement, building in part on his biography as an urban Oregonian with longstanding roots in rural Oregon. Proctor has argued for engagement as a third way beyond simple agreement or disagreement among people who differ on issues of environment, one marked by "creative tension," an embrace of paradox as deep environmental truths come into productive conflict with each other

Building on these concerns, Proctor launched EcoTypes, an educational and research initiative, in 2017. EcoTypes is a free, anonymous online survey with associated resources designed for participants to explore their environmental frameworks, or EcoTypes, and to consider the possibility that many care, just differently. EcoTypes starts with a broad range of fundamental environmental differences known as axes (12 total), which have yielded three statistically-derived themes called Place, Knowledge, and Action; EcoTypes are patterns in these themes. As of late 2024, the EcoTypes survey has been completed more than 15,000 times, with cross-national collaboration and a related scholarly project underway on environmental imaginaries.
