= Proctor Academy =

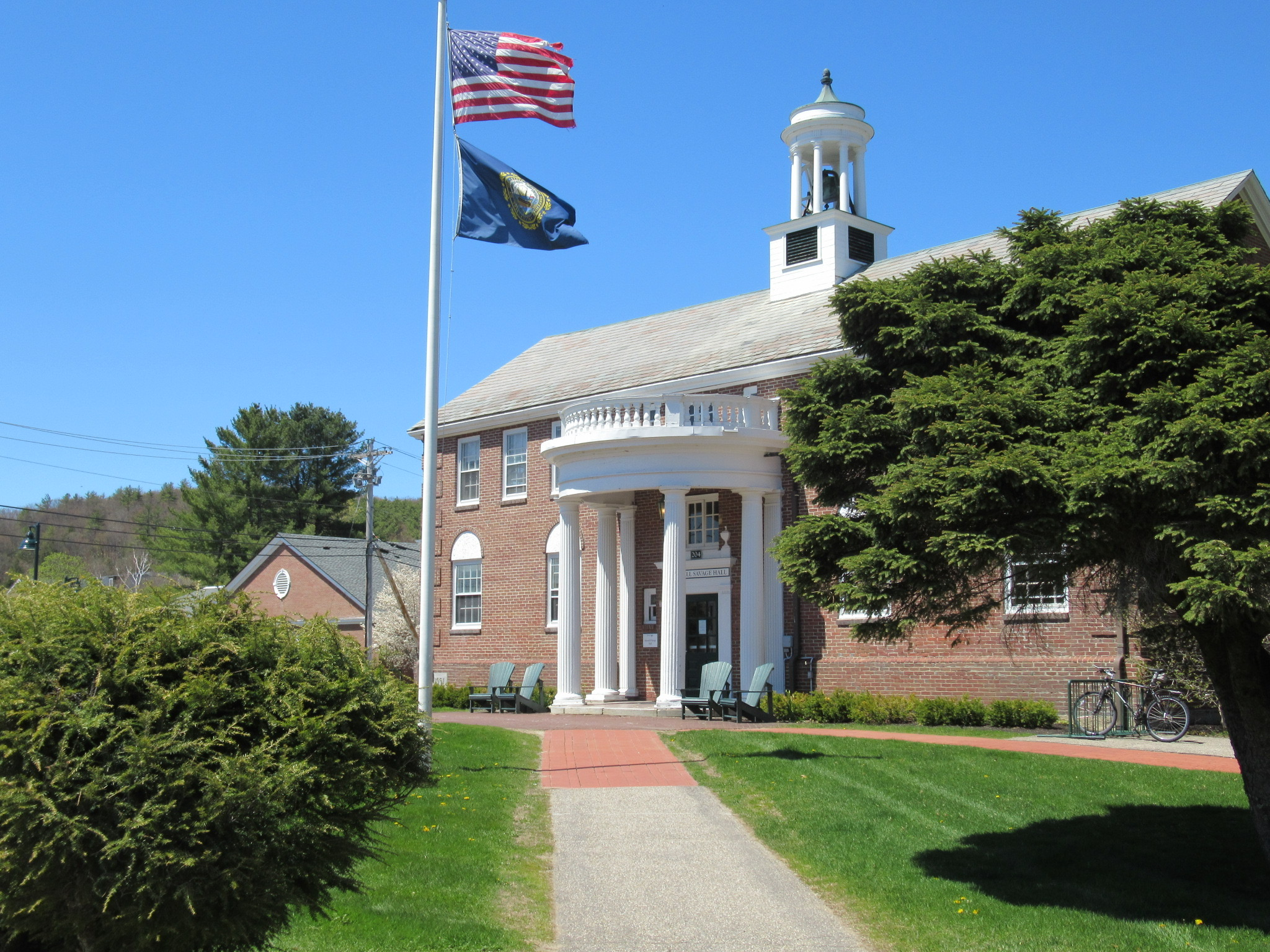
- Maxwell Savage Hall

Location
- 204 Main Street; Andover, New Hampshire 03216; United States; 43.4372976°N 71.8239693°W

Information
- Type: Private, Boarding
- Motto: Live to Learn, Learn to Live
- Established: 1848; 178 years ago
- CEEB code: 300015
- Head of school: Amy Bonnefond Smucker
- Faculty: 85
- Grades: 9-12
- Enrollment: 360 total 285 boarding 75 day
- Average class size: 12
- Student to teacher ratio: 5:1
- Campus: Small town
- Campus size: 2,500 acres (12 km²)
- Colors: Green and White
- Athletics conference: Lakes Region
- Mascot: Hornet
- Rival: Holderness School
- Accreditation: New England Association of Schools and Colleges
- Endowment: $41 million
- Tuition: $67,200 boarding / $39,100 day
- Website: www.proctoracademy.org

Proctor Academy is a coeducational, independent preparatory boarding school for grades 9–12 located on 2,500 acres (10 km^{2}) in Andover, New Hampshire. The school was established in 1848 by the town of Andover, with Dyer H. Sanborn as the principal. There are about 370 students.

== History ==
=== Origin ===
Proctor Academy first began as Andover Academy, established in 1848 by the town of Andover. The idea of the school spawned from a conversation between the wives of the area's prominent families. The women shared a strong conviction that their town needed a school for its expanding population. On June 23, 1848, the incorporation of the academy was approved, with Samuel Butterfield as president, Walcott Hamlin as secretary, and True Brown and John Fellows as executive committee members.

The academy opened its doors in August 1848, on the second floor of the church on Main Street, with many of the desks, chairs and chalkboards donated by the Butterfields. Eliza Butterfield set up the curriculum with Dyer H. Sanborn as the principal and Eliza Wingate as "preceptress". The first term had 43 girls and 65 boys enrolled, but within four years the school had grown to just over 250 students.

=== 1850–1900 ===
Principal Sanborn (1850–1851) was very popular with the students, and the school thrived through its first couple of years with funding from generous patrons. After two years, Sanborn stepped down, and Moses Leland Morse of Bowdoin College took over for the next two years as principal. Under Morse, the student body more than doubled, as chemistry was added to the curriculum and the guaranty fund reached $3,000. Woodbury Langdon, Luther Puffer (law student), and John Simonds were some of the first graduates to go on to college. After Principal Morse stepped down, Thaddeus W. Bruce (1852–1853) of Dartmouth College took the helm with Miss Marcia Foster as assistant (who later married). Around this time future world-renowned artist David Dalhoff Neal also attended classes. George Dustan took over as principal in 1854 when the school fell victim to a smallpox outbreak, in which one of the teachers and a former student died.

The smallpox epidemic in 1854-1855 forced the school to close. In 1857, the school reopened its doors as the New England Christian Literary and Biblical Institute, then again in 1860 as the Andover Christian Institute. In 1865, the school was closed and reopened in Wolfeboro, New Hampshire, as the Wolfeboro Christian Institute.

As the school struggled, former Andover resident John Proctor, the inventor of the threaded wood screw, returned, in 1857, to build up the town. By the 1870s Proctor helped to return the school to Andover, debt-free, as well as build a new dormitory on the site of modern-day Gannett House. In 1879, the Unitarian Church sought to purchase the Andover school in order to create a school "free from...theological dogmatizing and unnatural religious methods." Andover was a hotbed of Unitarian thought, which helped to facilitate the sale of the school. In 1881, the school was opened as Proctor Academy in honor of John Proctor's contributions to the school.

=== The 1930s and 1940s ===
Not realizing the severity of the economic downturn, in 1932 the trustees of the school invested $45,000 to build Maxwell Savage Hall. At the first assembly of the 1935 school year, Headmaster Carl Wetherell announced that he was quitting due to the poor outlook for the school. A search for a replacement was hurriedly started. John Halsey Gulick took the job, and immediately instituted sweeping reforms of the school, creating mechanical arts programs such as boat building, wood shop, and machine shop. Students were involved in the upkeep and improvement of the school, clearing the land for the school's first ski area, Slalom Hill, as well as a farm which was used to feed the community.

=== The 1950s and 1960s ===
Lyle Farrell—a 1929 graduate of the University of New Hampshire and captain of the 1928 Wildcats football team — who started teaching at Proctor in the 1930s, took over as Headmaster of the school in 1952. During his time as Headmaster, he pushed for the expansion of the school, leading to the construction of Holland Auditorium, Shirley Hall, Farrell Field House, Leonard Field, Farrell Field and the Blackwater Ski Area. Farrell also established the learning skills programs for college-bound students with dyslexia.

=== The 1970s to 1980s ===
In 1971, David Fowler succeeded Lyle Farrell as Headmaster. He instituted a democratic student government, rather than a seniority system. Realizing the unique location and programs that Proctor offered, they created a wilderness orientation program for new students, which still exists today. In 1974, the mountain classroom program was created, combining an Outward Bound type of small group outdoor experience with specialized academic sessions. By 1975, Proctor had faculty and facilities in Madrid, Spain, and Clermont-Ferrand, France, which led to later experiential education programs in Segovia, Spain, and Pont-l'Abbé, France.

== Campus ==
Proctor Academy is located on 2,500 acres (10 km^{2}) in the town of Andover, New Hampshire. The property is a state-certified tree farm.

One of the newest additions to the campus, Peabody House, was completed in 2008 on the former site of Morton House, which was torn down in August 2007.

=== Dorms ===
Proctor Academy has 19 dormitories that are either in use or are no longer in use.

=== Notable buildings ===
- Recording Studio (built 2006), state-of-the-art building-within-a-building designed to isolate the studio from any outside noise
- Steve and Sarah Wilkins Meetinghouse (built 2001), theater and meetinghouse for all-school assemblies, also contains the dance studio, dressing rooms, black box, scene shop, and green room.
- The Cabin (built 1991), cabin located on the top of the hill behind Proctor's dorms, where students are allowed to stay for the night on the weekend.
- Yarrow's Lodge, ski lodge at the Blackwater Ski Area, base for the student ski patrol.

== Notable alumni ==
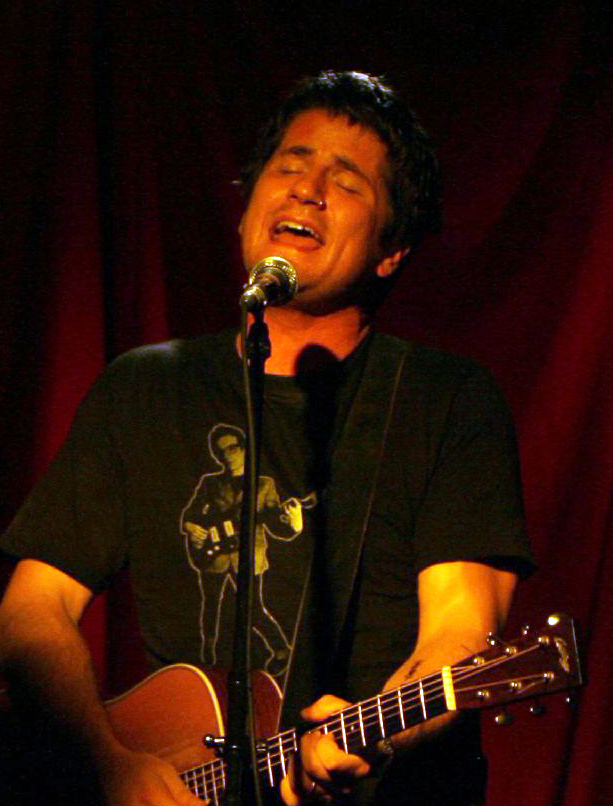
Matt Nathanson

Notable people who have attended the school include:

- Bob Beattie, '51 - former US Alpine Ski Team Head Coach and ABC television commentator
- Jerome Dyson, '06 - basketball player for Hapoel Jerusalem of the Israeli Premier League, 2012-13 top scorer in the Israel Basketball Premier League
- Peter Elbow - English professor, author of Writing without Teachers
- Nicholas Fairall, '07 - US Olympian 2014 Winter Games, US Ski Team, ski jumper
- John McVey - singer/songwriter
- Matt Nathanson, '91 - singer/songwriter
- David Dalhoff Neal - artist, one of the first students in the early 1850s
- Robert Richardson, '73 - Oscar-winning cinematographer (Platoon, JFK, The Aviator, Kill Bill)
- David Russell - Member of the New Hampshire House of Representatives
- Carl Van Loan, '98 - US Olympian, US Ski Team Nordic Combined, Large Hill team
- Cole Williams, '99 - television actor (Scrubs, 8 Simple Rules)
