= Dennis Proctor =

British civil servant (1905–1983)

Portrait by Walter Bird, 1949

Sir Philip Dennis Proctor KCB (1 September 1905 – 30 August 1983) was a British civil servant.

The son of Sir Philip Bridger Proctor KBE (1870–1940) and his wife Nellie Eliza Shaul, Proctor was educated at Harrow and King's College, Cambridge (classical Tripos).

He worked in HM Treasury and later was Permanent Secretary at the Ministry of Power.

Proctor was made a Companion of the Order of the Bath in 1946 and was promoted to Knight Commander in 1959.

Proctor was instrumental in the forming of the Paintings in Hospitals charity in London and served on the charity's board of trustees from 1971.

On the basis of interviews with Proctor and his friends, the intelligence officer Peter Wright alleged in his book Spycatcher that Proctor, while Permanent Secretary at the Ministry of Power, was at the very least, by Proctor's own account, an unwitting source of secret information to the Soviets via his close friend and Soviet spy Guy Burgess, from whom he had kept no secrets. In Proctor's opinion, this had obviated the necessity to recruit him (Proctor) as a Soviet agent.
