= William Proctor =

William Proctor may refer to:

- Will Proctor, American football player
- William Proctor (Salem witch trials), one of the accused in the Salem witch trials
- William Proctor (Australian politician) (1850–1905), New South Wales politician
- William Proctor (UK politician) (1896–1967), Labour Party Member of Parliament (MP) for Eccles 1945–1964
- William Beauchamp-Proctor (1781–1861), British Royal Navy officer
- William H. Proctor (1827-1902), member of the Wisconsin State Assembly
- William L. Proctor (born 1933), Republican Party member of the Florida House of Representatives

== See also ==
- William Procter (disambiguation)
