= James Putnam (curator) =

Art and historical exhibition curator

James Putnam is an independent curator and writer best known for his creative, innovative approach to curating and juxtaposing contemporary art with historic museum collections.

== Life and work ==
James Putnam was born in Walthamstow, London. He attended the City of London School and went on to study History of Art at the University of London. Putnam became a curator in the Egyptian Antiquities Department of the British Museum, and in 1994, he initiated and organized the ‘Time Machine’ exhibition juxtaposing the work of contemporary artists with ancient sculptures. He subsequently curated a new version of the exhibition at the Museo Egizio, Turin, and many other museum interventions at the British Museum with works by Henry Moore, Richard Wentworth and Fred Wilson. His uses of ‘museum intervention’, ‘museum effect’ and ‘the museum as medium’ in the writings and curatorial statements have sparked research interests in museology and had profound impact on curatorial literature.

Other activities in the early 1990s included a stint as a visual artist and a musician when he formed the experimental rock band GOD together with Phil Gray & Richard Dyer to tour UK extensively before disbanding. The band reformed in 2015 to play a gig at the Red Gallery during the Frieze Art Fair.

Between 1999 and 2003, he founded and directed the British Museum's Contemporary Arts & Cultures Programme, which staged performances and talks by Tracey Emin, Vivienne Westwood, Cai Guo-Qiang, Antony Gormley, Grayson Perry, Sarah Lucas, Gavin Turk, Jake & Dinos Chapman and Michael Craig Martin.

== Teaching and curatorial activities ==
After leaving the British Museum, he became a visiting scholar in Museology Programme at New York University and curated numerous international exhibitions including Arte All’Arte 9, Tuscany (2004). He was also a guest curator for Echigo-Tsumari Art Triennial, Japan (2005-6) and the Busan Biennial in South Korea (2010). In the summer of 2016, he co-curated ‘Daydreaming with Stanley Kubrick’ at Somerset House with musician and DJ James Lavelle; the exhibition comprised immersive multi-media installations by 45 contemporary artists and musicians inspired by Kubrick's films.

He is currently Senior Research Fellow Exhibitions at the University of the Arts, London. His ongoing curating projects include large-scale collateral projects for the prestigious Venice Biennales from 2007 to 2017 (52nd~57th Edition), and a series of critically acclaimed exhibitions that he collaborates with Sophie Calle, Sarah Lucas, Andy Hope 1930, Ellen Gallagher, Mat Collishaw, Noble & Webster, Miroslaw Balka and Gavin Turk in the Freud Museum, London.

== Publications ==
Putnam has published several books on ancient Egypt including An Introduction to Egyptology, Amazing Facts about Ancient Egypt and contributed essays to numerous artist catalogues. His best known work, Art and Artifact (Thames & Hudson, 2000 & 2010), received widespread critical acclaims.
