= Simon Procter =

British artist and photographer

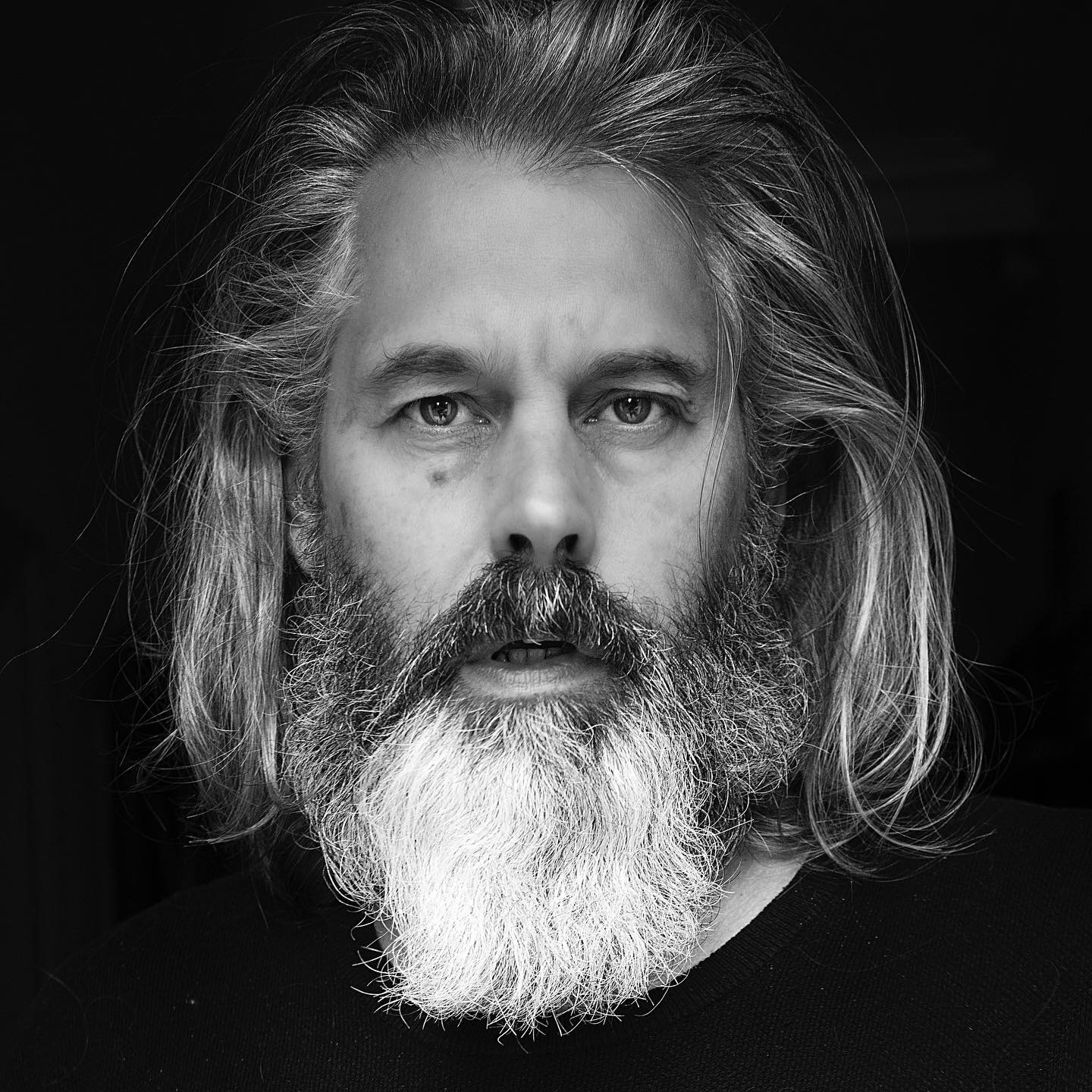
- Born: 8 November 1968 (age 57); Lancashire, England
- Education: Nottingham Trent University
- Known for: Film Director, Painter, Photographer

Simon Procter (born 8 November 1968) is an expatriate British Painter, photographer and award winning film director living In Paris. He has collaborated with Karl Lagerfeld, Steven Spielberg, John Galliano and Vivienne Westwood. He is considered one of the most influential fine art photographers of his generation. Today, his works are held in museum and galleries worldwide Including the Boston Museum of Fine Art, the Moscow Museum of Modern Art, the Paris Museum of Decorative Arts and the Musee Galleria.

== Life ==
Procter was born in Lancashire, Northern England and grew up in Royston, a small mining village in South Yorkshire.

He studied fine art, specializing in painting and sculpture, and holds a BA degree in Fine Art (Honors) from Nottingham Trent University.

== Art ==
Simon Procter studied Fine Art for many years, initially concentrating on both painting and sculpture, and graduated with a B.A. Honours Degree in Fine Art from Trent University, UK. He moved to Paris in the late 1990s and, while doing various odd jobs in the city, met by accident one of the famous V magazine founders and although primarily a self taught photographer he quickly became a highly respected commercial Fashion photographer.

Initially he shot international campaigns for Nike. Reebok, Speedo, Nokia, Adidas, Tommy Hilfiger, Hästens, Marriott, Montblanc, Falke, L'Oréal and among others.

His photography has appeared worldwide in magazines V Magazine, Vogue and Harper's Bazaar and in the magazine editions of the New York Times, The Independent, T Magazine and The Daily Telegraph.

In 2008, Vivienne Westwood created a photo series with Simon Procter called "The Magic of Fashion" with the Harry Potter film actress Emma Watson. The story is published in the 342-page Harper's Bazaar book "Fabulous Fashion".

In 2009, Simon Procter met John Galliano and created with him the Dior Haute Couture collections with Harper's Bazaar, opulent scenes with models and horses, as we know them from battle paintings from the late Baroque and Renaissance periods. The result was the "Galliano Royal" series.

In the same year he began photographing the collections for Dolce & Gabbana and Steven Spielberg invited him into his dream landscape to photograph stars, Breaking Dawn star Dakota Fanning, Kiernan Shipka from Mad Men, Malin Åkerman and Evan Rachel Wood for the Harper's Bazaar feature "The Spielberg Connection", who appear in recreations of some of Spielberg's most famous scenes and characters.

For the film "Oz the Great and Powerful" with James Franco in 2013, Simon Procter photographed Atlanta de Cadenet Taylor for Harper's Bazaar in Louis Vuitton, Bottega Veneta and Svarovski for Harper's Bazaar.

In the same year, Procter photographed the Iconoclouds project. with five of the most internationally famous fashion designers: Karl Lagerfeld, Stefano Gabbana and Domenico Dolce, Alber Elbaz and Donatella Versace. The series appears in the American Harper's Bazaar.Procter then used his unique art aesthetic to develop a photographic technique that captures and documents the large scale of a fashion show in the architectural space in which it takes place. Mixing long exposure and painterly techniques this first fashion photography project was photographing a Dior show from 30 meters above the catwalk. The resulting images were published in two major articles in V Magazine and exhibited at Colette, with support from Armani and Prada. In 2012 He produced the official state portrait of The Republican Guard of France.

Procter was closely associated with the designer Karl Lagerfeld for over ten years. Following Lagerfeld's death, Procter published a collection of these photographs titled 'Lagerfeld - the Chanel Shows'

== Expositions ==
- 2026: Wolfcrown Gallery, Joy Storm, Monumental canvas.
- 2021: Art Gallery Dubai & Art Photo Expo Lagerfeld
- 2020: Rosenbaum Contemporary, Miami,
- 2020: Four Seasons, London Opening Show (canceled Covid)
- 2020: London Photo, Guest of Honour (Canceled Covid)
- 2019: The Royal Monceau Raffles Paris Gallery, Paris, Europe Book Launch
- 2019: Rosenbaum Contemporary, Miami
- 2019: Art Basel Miami Beach, USA Book Launch
- 2018: Kate Vass Galerie, Zurich

Modeland

- 2018: Kate Vass Galerie, Monaco
- 2017: The Hermitage, Monaco

Simon Procter

- 2018: Kate Vass Galery, Zurich
- 2017: Royal Monceau, Paris
- 2016: Bethina Von Anim Gallery, Paris
- 2015: Milk Studios, NYC
- 2012: Rosenbaum Contemporary Fine Art, Florida
- 2005: Colette, Paris
