= Gianpietro Carlesso =

Italian artist

Gianpietro Carlesso (born 1961 in Bolzano, Italy) is a sculptor; he lives and works in Cormons, Italy.

After completing his education at the Trentino State Art Institute, he went on to study at the Academy of Fine Arts in Urbino. His held his first exhibition in conjunction with the Valente Contemporary Art Gallery.

Having won a scholarship from the Wilhelm Lehmbruck Museum in Duisburg, he spent 1989 and 1990 in Germany in a studio located on the site of the Krupp Steelworks in Rheinhausen. This scholarship in the Ruhr basin made a particularly important contribution to his artistic training. As a result of this experience he came into close contact with the history of continental European sculpture and developed an appreciation of the imposing dimensions of sculptures from beyond the Alps, and was to affect his subsequent work. He then went on to produce his first large-scale sculptures for a series of museum and public exhibitions. At the same time he worked with Gallery 44 in Düsseldorf and the Sander gallery in Darmstadt.

After returning to Italy he spent two years teaching sculpture at the Academy of Fine Arts in Urbino before dedicating himself entirely to his own work. He also exhibited with the Niccoli gallery in Parma and the Schrade gallery in Ulm. It was in this period that Carlesso's work came to be characterised by a specific search for “deconstruction”. The initial fruits of this influence upon his work were presented for the first time at the Palazzo dei Diamanti in Ferrara, Italy.

During the mid-1990s he and his family moved to the Friuli region of Italy. It was here that Carlesso came into contact with proprietors and institutions from the near East and this resulted in his participation in a number of exhibitions and projects. He also started working with the Winkelman Gallery in Düsseldorf.

Carlesso's sculptures are featured in public collections around the world, including the Mannheim Kunstmuseum, the German Post Office in Dortmund, the Deutsche Bank in Frankfurt and the Bolzano Museum of Modern Art.
