= Knowledge (magazine) =

British science magazine published 1881–1918

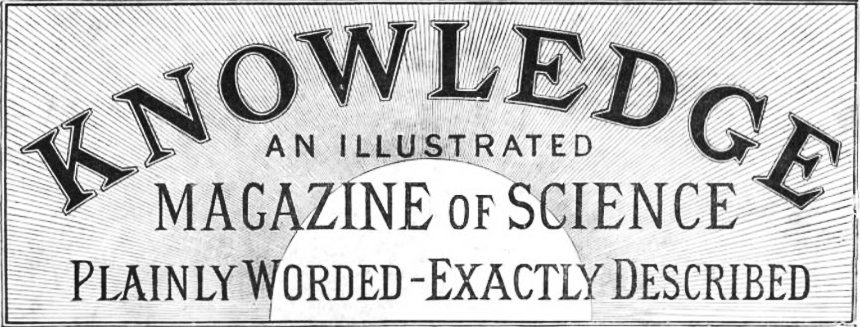
- Categories: Science
- Publisher: W.H. Allen (1881-1891); Witherby & Co. (1891-1918)
- Founder: Richard A. Proctor
- Founded: 1881
- Final issue: 1918
- Country: United Kingdom
- Language: English language
- OCLC: 173328045

Knowledge: An Illustrated Magazine of Science was a British popular science magazine published from 1881 to 1918. Founded by astronomer Richard A. Proctor, the magazine started as a weekly periodical, becoming monthly in 1885. The magazine was known for its extensive correspondence columns. Proctor himself, the first editor, was a significant contributor, and many of his discoveries or theoretical deductions first appeared in the magazine. Proctor was sometimes assisted in editorial duties by Edward Clodd. After Proctor's death in 1888, Arthur Cowper Ranyard took over editorship, then Harry Forbes Witherby after Ranyard's death.
