= Mary Proctor =

British astronomer

Mary Proctor FRAS FRMetS
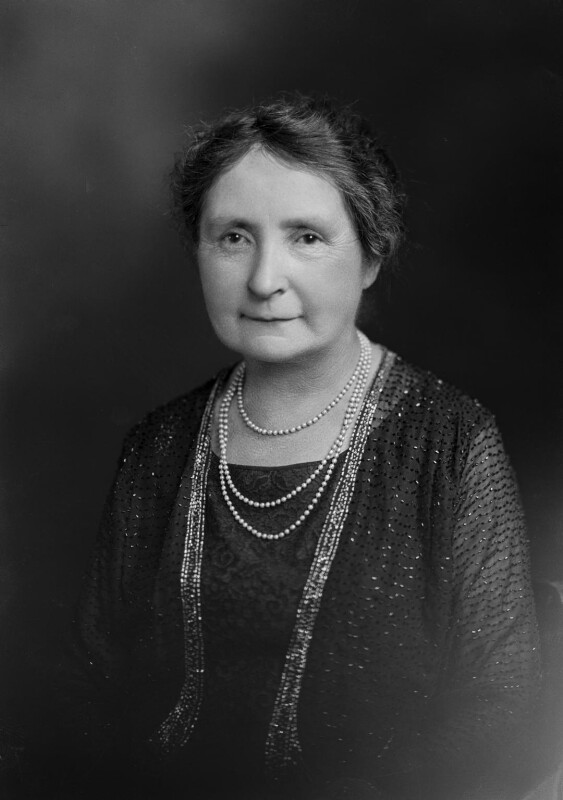
- Proctor in 1932
- Born: 1 April 1862; Dublin, Ireland
- Died: 11 September 1957 (aged 95); Finchley, Middlesex, England
- Education: Columbia University; College of Preceptors
- Parent(s): Richard A. Proctor; Marty Proctor

Mary Proctor FRAS FRMetS (1 April 1862 – 11 September 1957) was a British-American popularizer of astronomy. While not a professional astronomer, Proctor became well known for her books and articles written for the public – particularly her children's fiction.

== Early life ==
Mary Proctor was born 1 April 1862 in Dublin, Ireland, the daughter of Mary (née Mills) and Richard Proctor. Proctor's mother died in 1879. Her father remarried in 1881 and her family immigrated to the United States settling in Saint Joseph, Missouri in 1882.

Proctor's father was a British popularizer of astronomy, lecturer, and writer. As she grew up, Proctor often assisted her father in his work, looking after his library and correcting proofs of his books before they went to publication. She graduated from the College of Preceptors in London in 1898.

== Career ==
In 1881, Proctor assisted her father in founding and producing a journal called Knowledge. She wrote a series of articles on the topic of comparative mythology. After a well-received appearance at the World's Columbian Exposition 1893, she eventually developed a career as an astronomy lecturer. Her book-length debut, Stories of Starland (1898), was adopted by the New York City Board of Education. She worked as an astronomy teacher in private schools while attending Columbia University.

== Works ==
Proctor authored many articles for newspapers, journals and published numerous popular books. Her articles and books were mostly aimed for young readers, which earned her the nickname "the children's astronomer." Her books were easy to read, accurate, informative and well illustrated. Known and respected by many professional astronomers, Proctor became an elected member of the British Astronomical Association in 1897 and the American Association for the Advancement of Science in 1898. On 11 February 1916, she was elected as a fellow of the Royal Astronomical Society.

== Death and legacy ==
Proctor died 11 September 1947 in Finchley, Middlesex, England. The 52 km (32 mi) wide lunar crater Proctor is named after her.

== Bibliography ==
- Stories Of Starland, 1895.
- Giant Sun And His Family, 1896.
- "Halley's Comet after 75 years rushes Earthward again", San Francisco Call, August 23, 1908.
- Half Hours With The Summer Stars, 1911.
- Legends Of The Stars, 1922.
- The Children's Book Of The Heavens, 1924.
- Evenings With The Stars, 1924.
- Legends Of The Sun And Moon, 1926.
- The Romance Of Comets, 1926.
- The Romance Of The Sun, 1927.
- The Romance Of The Moon, 1928.
- The Romance Of The Planets, 1929.
- Wonders Of The Sky, 1931.
- Our Stars Month By Month, 1937
- M. Proctor and A. C. D. Crommelin, Comets, 1937.
- Everyman's Astronomy 1939.
- Comets, Meteors And Shooting Stars, 1940.
