= Ellen Henrietta Ranyard =

English writer and missionary

Ellen Henrietta Ranyard (9 January 1810 – 11 February 1879) was an English writer and missionary who worked with the poor of London. She founded the London Bible and Domestic Female Mission.

== Life ==
She was born Ellen Henrietta White in the district of Nine Elms, London, the eldest daughter of John Bazley White, a cement maker. At the age of sixteen she and a friend, Elizabeth Saunders, caught a fever while visiting the sick poor. Her friend died, and from that time onward, Ellen White regularly visited the poor, collected money to supply them with bibles, and interested herself in the bible society.

After her family removed to Swanscombe in Kent, she married there, on 10 January 1839, Benjamin Ranyard. In 1852 she wrote The Book and its Story, a Narrative for the Young, which proved extraordinarily popular. In 1857, with her husband and family, she took up residence at 13 Hunter Street, Brunswick Square, London. Soon afterwards she founded, in Seven Dials, a missionary society for the supply of bibles, and described her labours in a periodical, which she supported, called The Book and its Missions, past and present (vols. i. to ix. 1856 – 64). From 1865 the magazine was wholly devoted to furthering her mission, and was renamed The Missing Link Magazine, or Bible Work at Home and Abroad (1865 – 79). The title 'Bible woman' was first used in connection to her work among the poor. They were called as Bible women because they distributed the Bible and read the Bible to poor ladies. In 1879 upwards of 170 Bible women were employed in the work of the mission. In 1868 Mrs. Ranyard commenced training nurses, and eighty were ultimately engaged in attending the sick poor in the poorest districts of London. The Bible women spread throughout the non-western world.

She died of bronchitis at home in the winter of 1879. Her work was continued as the London Bible and Domestic Female Mission, whose doings are chronicled in Bible Work at Home and Abroad, vol. i. 1884. Her husband died one month after she did on 10 March 1879, aged 76. Both were buried in West Norwood Cemetery. Her son was the astronomer Arthur Cowper Ranyard.

== Publications ==
Under the signature of L. N. R., besides tracts and short stories, Mrs. Ranyard wrote:

- Nineveh and its Relics in the British Museum, 1852.
- The Book and its Story, a Narrative for the Young, on occasion of the Jubilee of the British and Foreign Bible Society. By L. N. R., with an Introductory Preface by the Rev. Thomas Phillips, Jubilee Secretary. 1852
- The Bible Collectors, or Principles in Practice, 1854.
- Leaves from Life, 1855.
- The Missing Link, or Bible Women in the Homes of the London Poor, 1859. (Online copy of 1860 New York ed.)
  - Second edition in 1875 as Nurses for the needy, or Bible-women nurses in the homes of the London poor
- Life Work, or the Link and the Rivet, 1861.
- The True Institution of Sisterhood, or a Message and its Messengers, 1862.
- Stones crying out and Rock-Witness to the Narratives of the Bible concerning the Times of the Jews, 1865; 2nd edit. 1865.
- London and Ten Years Work in it, 1868.
- The Missing Link Tracts Series, 1871, a set of seven tracts.
- The Border Land, and other Poems, 1876.
