= Richard A. Proctor =

English astronomer

Richard Anthony Proctor
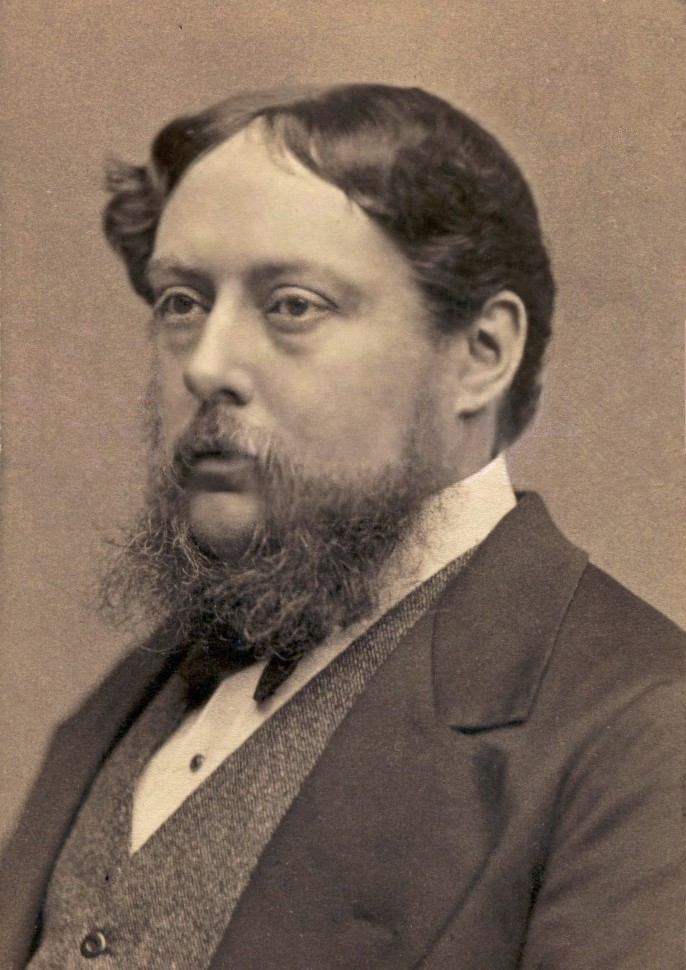
- Richard A. Proctor
- Born: 23 March 1837; Chelsea, London
- Died: 12 September 1888 (aged 51); New York City
- Known for: Popular writings about astronomy Early maps of Mars
- Children: Mary Proctor
- Scientific career
- Fields: Astronomy

Richard Anthony Proctor FRAS (23 March 1837 – 12 September 1888) was an English astronomer. He is best remembered for having produced one of the earliest maps of Mars in 1867 from 27 drawings by the English observer William Rutter Dawes. His map was later superseded by those of Giovanni Schiaparelli and Eugène Antoniadi and his nomenclature was dropped (for instance, his "Kaiser Sea" became Syrtis Major Planum).

He used old drawings of Mars dating back to 1666 to try to determine the sidereal day of Mars. His final estimate, in 1873, was 24h 37m 22.713s, very close to the modern value of 24h 37m 22.663s.

The crater Proctor on Mars is named after him.

== Biography ==
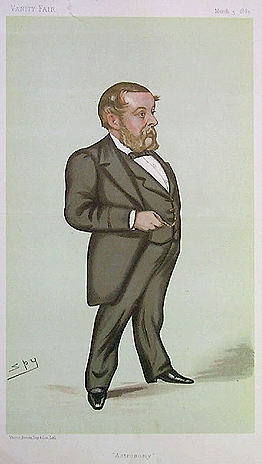
"Astronomy" Richard Proctor as caricatured by Spy in Vanity Fair, 3 March 1883

Richard Proctor's father died in 1850 and his mother attended to his education. He was sent to King's College London and subsequently earned a scholarship at St John's College, Cambridge. He graduated in 1860 as 23rd wrangler.

Proctor then read for the bar, but turned to astronomy and authorship instead, and in 1865 published an article on the Colours of Double Stars in the Cornhill Magazine. His first book Saturn and its System was published in the same year, at his own expense. This work contains an elaborate account of the phenomena presented by the planet; but although favourably received by astronomers, it had no great sale. He intended to follow it up with similar treatises on Mars, Jupiter, Sun, Moon, comets and meteors, stars, and nebulae, and had in fact commenced a monograph on Mars, when the failure of a New Zealand bank deprived him of an independence which would have enabled him to carry out his scheme without anxiety as to its commercial success or failure.

Being thus obliged to depend upon his writings for the support of his family, and having learned by the fate of his Saturn and its System that the general public are not attracted by works requiring arduous study, he cultivated a more popular style. He wrote for a number of periodicals; and although he has stated that he would at this time willingly have turned to stone-breaking on the roads, or any other form of hard and honest but unscientific labour, if a modest competence had been offered him in any such direction, he attained a high degree of popularity, and his numerous works had a wide influence in familiarising the public with the main facts of astronomy.

Proctor's earlier efforts were not always successful. His Handbook of the Stars (1866) was refused by Messrs Longmans and Messrs Macmillan, but being privately printed, it sold fairly well. For his Half-Hours with the Telescope (1868), which eventually reached a 20th edition, he received originally £25 from Messrs Hardwick. Although teaching was uncongenial to him he took pupils in mathematics, and held for a time the position of mathematical coach for Woolwich and Sandhurst.

Proctor's literary standing meantime improved, and he became a regular contributor to The Intellectual Observer, Chamber's Journal and the Popular Science Review. In 1870 appeared his Other Worlds Than Ours, in which he discussed the question of the plurality of worlds in the light of new facts. This was followed by a long series of popular treatises in rapid succession, amongst the more important of which are Light Science for Leisure Hours and The Sun (1871); The Orbs around Us and Essays on Astronomy (1872); The Expanse of Heaven, The Moon and The Borderland of Science (1873); The Universe and the Coming Transits and Transits of Venus (1874); Our Place among Infinities (1875); Myths and Marvels of Astronomy (1877); The Universe of Stars (1878); Flowers of the Sky (1879); The Poetry of Astronomy (1880); Easy Star Lessons and Familiar Science Studies (1882); Mysteries of Time and Space (1883) - Digital Copy; "The Great Pyramid" (1883) - Digital Copy; The Universe of Suns (1884); The Seasons (1885); Other Suns than Ours and Half-Hours with the Stars (1887).

In 1881 Proctor founded Knowledge, a popular weekly magazine of science (converted into a monthly in 1885), which had a considerable circulation. In it he wrote on a great variety of subjects, including chess and whist.

Proctor was also the author of the articles on astronomy in the American Cyclopaedia and the ninth edition of the Encyclopædia Britannica, and was well known as a popular lecturer on astronomy in England, America and Australia.

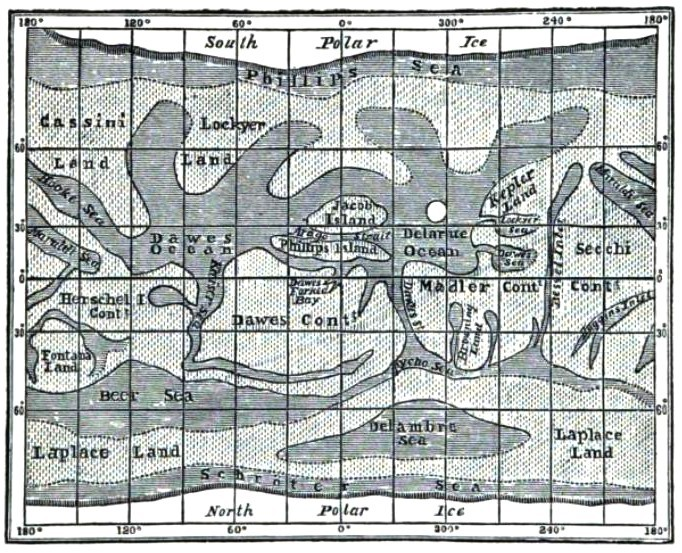
Proctor's map of Mars

Proctor was elected a fellow of the Royal Astronomical Society on 8 June 1866. He became honorary secretary in 1872, and contributed eighty-three separate papers to its Monthly Notices. Of these the more noteworthy dealt with the distribution of stars, star clusters and nebulae, and the construction of the sidereal universe. He was an expert in all that related to map-drawing, and published two star-atlases. A chart on an isographic projection, exhibiting all the stars contained in the Bonner Durchmusterung, was designed to show the laws according to which the stars down to the 9–10th magnitude are distributed over the northern heavens. His Theoretical Considerations respecting the Corona (Monthly Notices, xxxi. 184, 254) also deserve mention, as well as his discussions of the rotation of Mars, by which be deduced its period with a probable error of 0.005. He also vigorously criticised the official arrangements for observing the transits of Venus of 1874 and 1882. He was elected as a member to the American Philosophical Society in 1874.

Proctor's largest and most ambitious work, Old and New Astronomy, left unfinished at his death, was completed by Arthur Cowper Ranyard and published in 1892 with a second edition in 1895. Proctor settled in America some time after his second marriage in 1881, and died of yellow fever at New York City on 12 September 1888. A monument was later erected in his memory that was donated by George W. Childs, publisher of the Public Ledger newspaper in Philadelphia. Mary Proctor, his daughter by his first marriage, became an astronomer and a successful lecturer and writer. Proctor’s second wife, Sallie (1856-1941), was also active in astronomy.
