= Jean-André Deluc =

Swiss geologist and meteorologist (1727–1817)

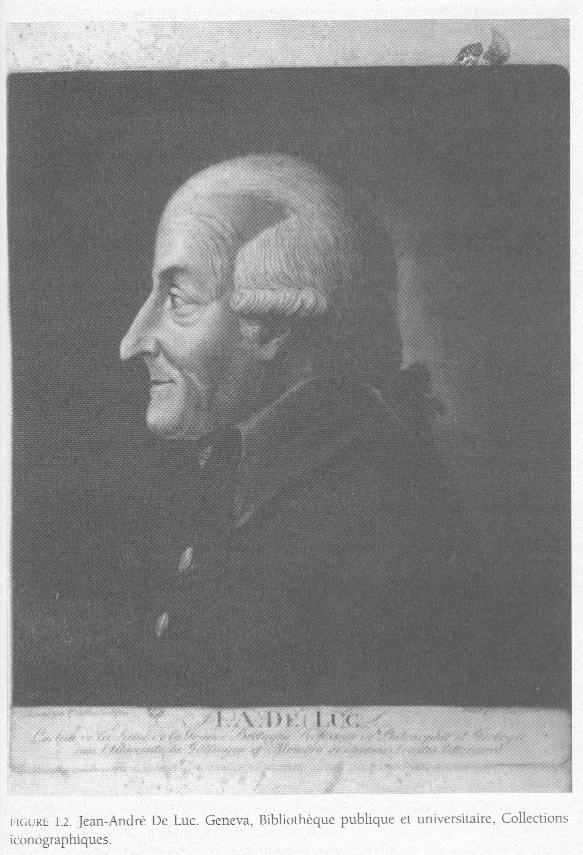
- Born: 8 February 1727; Geneva, Republic of Geneva
- Died: 7 November 1817 (aged 90); Windsor, Berkshire, England
- Citizenship: Genevan, then Swiss since 1815
- Scientific career
- Fields: Geology, meteorology

Jean-André Deluc or de Luc (8 February 1727 – 7 November 1817) was a geologist, natural philosopher and meteorologist from the Republic of Geneva. He also devised measuring instruments.

== Biography ==
Jean-André Deluc was born in Geneva. His family had come to the Republic of Geneva from Lucca, Italy, in the 15th century. His mother was Françoise Huaut. His father, Jacques-François Deluc, had written in refutation of Bernard Mandeville and other rationalistic writers, but he was also a decided supporter of Jean-Jacques Rousseau.

As a student of Georges-Louis Le Sage, Jean-André Deluc received a basic education in mathematics and in natural philosophy. He engaged early in business, which occupied a large part of his first adult years, with the exception of scientific investigation in the Alps. With the help of his brother Guillaume-Antoine, he built a splendid collection of mineralogy and fossils.

Deluc also took part in politics. In 1768, sent on an embassy to the duc de Choiseul in Paris, he succeeded in gaining the duke's friendship. In 1770 he became a member of the Council of Two Hundred in Geneva.

Three years later, business reverses forced him to leave his native town; he returned, briefly, only once. The change freed him for non-scientific pursuits; with little regret he moved to Great Britain in 1773, where he was appointed reader to Queen Charlotte, a position he held for forty-four years and that afforded him both leisure and income.

Despite his duties at court, he was given leave to make several tours of Switzerland, France, Holland and Germany. At the beginning of his German tour (1798–1804), he was distinguished with an honorary professorship of philosophy and geology at the University of Göttingen, which helped to cover diplomatic missions for the king George III. Back to Britain, he undertook a geological tour of the country (1804–1807).

In 1773 Deluc was made a fellow of the Royal Society; he was a correspondent of the French Academy of Sciences and a member of several other learned societies. He died at Windsor, Berkshire, England, in 1817, after nearly 70 years of research. Deluc, an impact crater on the Moon, was given his name.

== Scientific contributions ==
=== Observations and theory ===
Deluc's main interests were geology and meteorology; Georges Cuvier mentions him as an authority on the former subject. His major geological work, Lettres physiques et morales sur les montagnes et sur l'histoire de la terre et de l'homme (6 vol., 1778–1780), was dedicated to Queen Charlotte. He published volumes on geological travels: in northern Europe (1810), in England (1811), and in France, Switzerland and Germany (1813).

Deluc noticed the disappearance of heat in the thawing of ice about the same time that Joseph Black made it the foundation of his hypothesis of latent heat. He ascertained that water was densest at about 5 °C (and not at the freezing temperature). He was the originator of the theory, later reactivated by John Dalton, that the quantity of water vapour contained in any space is independent of the presence or density of the air, or of any other elastic fluid.

His book Lettres sur l'histoire physique de la terre (Paris, 1798), addressed to Johann Friedrich Blumenbach, develops a theory of the Earth divided into six periods modelled on the six days of Creation. It contains an essay on the existence of a General Principle of Morality and gives an interesting account of conversations with Voltaire and Rousseau. Deluc was an ardent admirer of Francis Bacon, on whose writings he published two works: Bacon tel qu'il est (Berlin, 1800), showing the bad faith of the French translator, who had omitted many passages favorable to revealed religion, and Précis de la philosophie de Bacon (2 vols 8vo, Paris, 1802), giving an interesting view of the progress of natural science. Lettres sur le christianisme (Berlin and Hanover, 1803) was a controversial correspondence with Wilhelm Abraham Teller of Berlin in regard to the Mosaic cosmogony. His Traité élémentaire de géologie (Paris, 1809, translated into English by Henry de la Fite the same year) was principally intended as a refutation of James Hutton and John Playfair. They had shown that geology was driven by the operation of internal heat and erosion, but their system required much more time than Deluc's Mosaic variety of neptunism allowed.

Many other papers were in the Journal de Physique, in the Philosophical Transactions and in the Philosophical Magazine.

=== Instruments ===
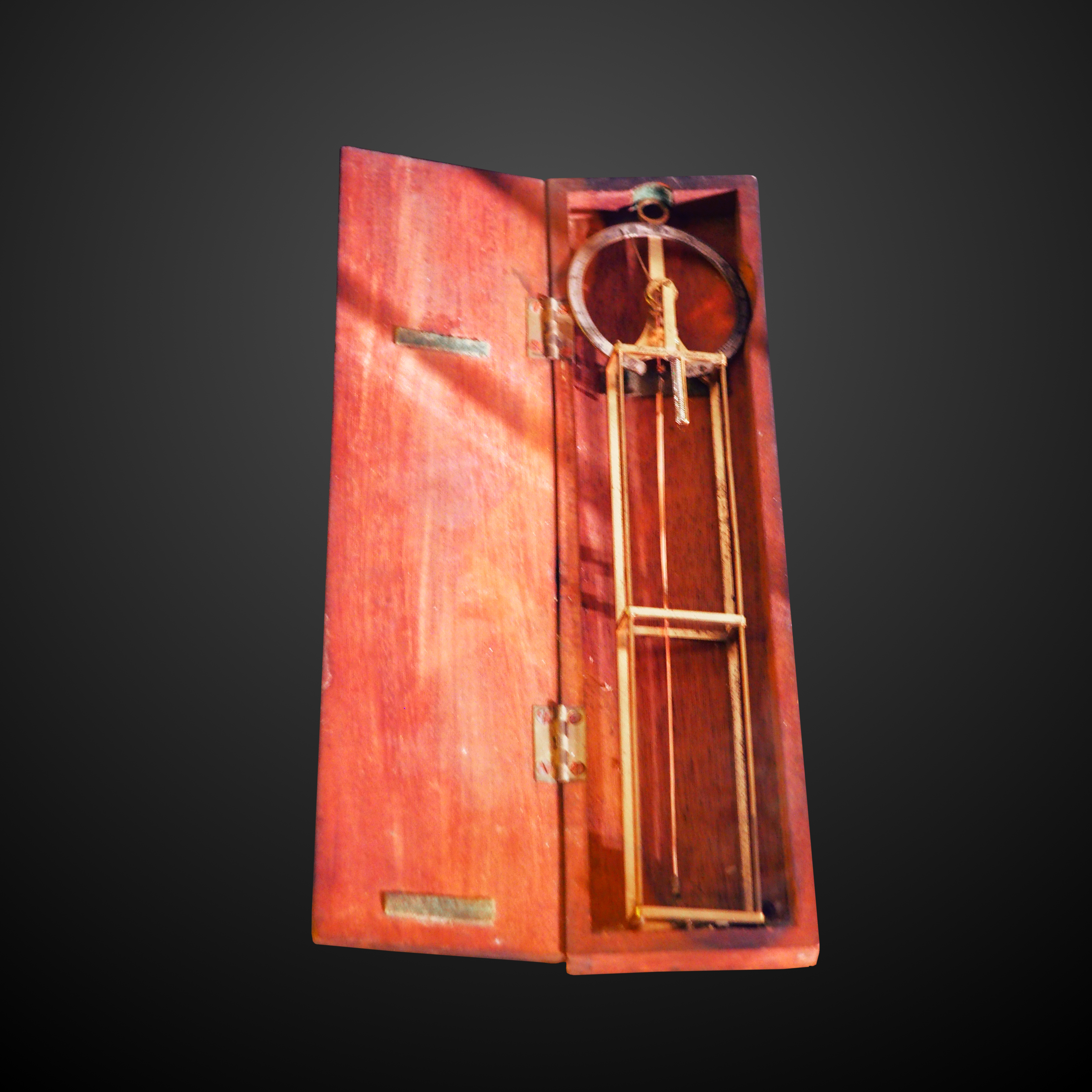
Deluc's whalebone hygrometer, on display at the Musée d'histoire des sciences de la ville de Genève.

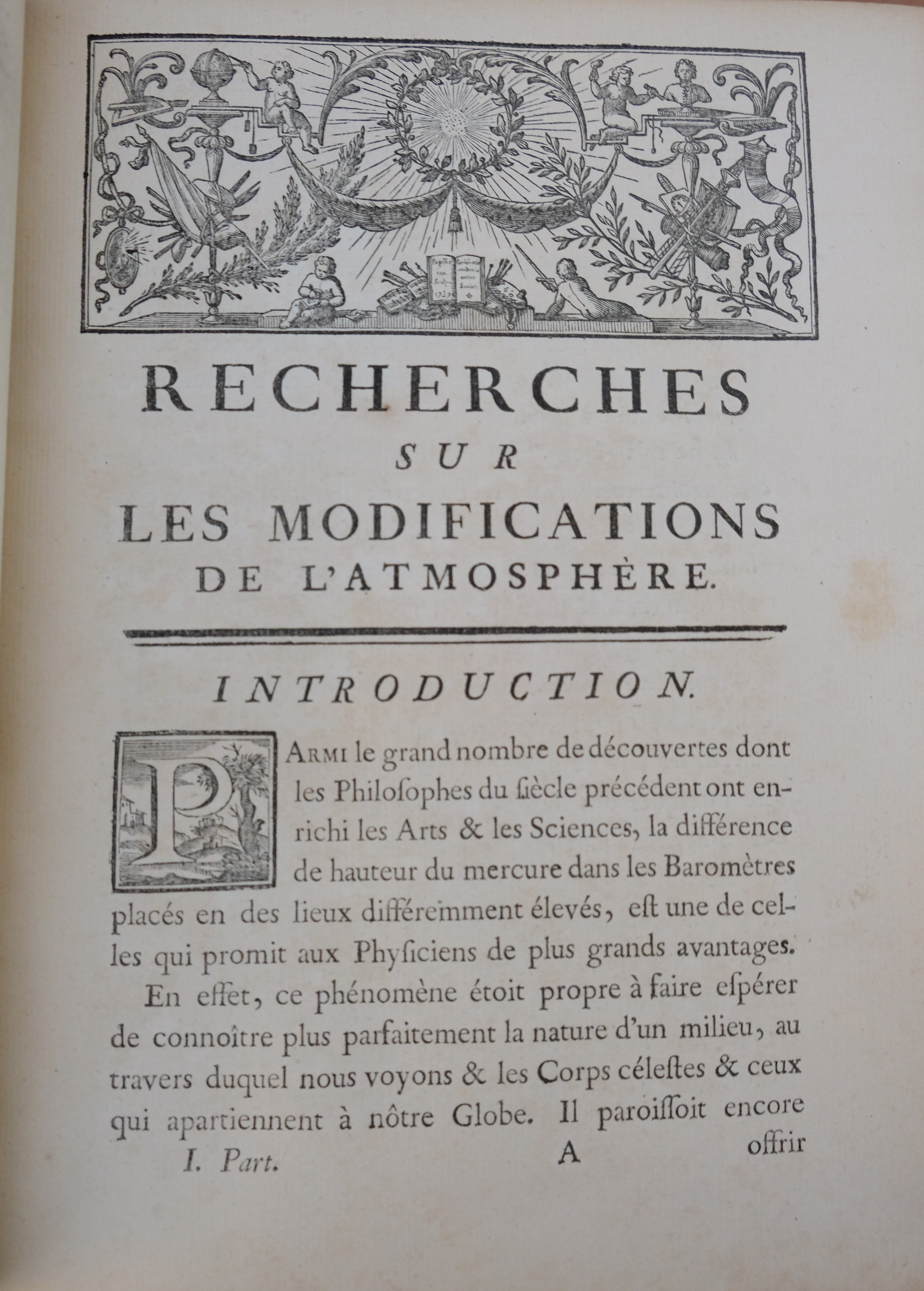
Introduction page of a 1772 copy of volumes 1 of "Recherches sur les modifications de l'atmosphère"

Deluc dedicated a large part of his activity to perfecting or inventing measuring instruments.

He devised a portable barometer for use in geological expeditions. His Recherches sur les modifications de l'atmosphère (2 vols. 4to, Geneva, 1772; 2nd ed., 4 vols. Paris, 1784) contain experiments on moisture, evaporation and the indications of hygrometers and thermometers. He applied the barometer to the determination of heights. The Philosophical Transactions published his account of a new hygrometer, which resembled a mercurial thermometer, with an ivory bulb, which expanded by moisture, and caused the mercury to descend. He later devised a whalebone hygrometer which sparked a bitter controversy with Horace-Bénédict de Saussure, himself inventor of a hair hygrometer. He gave the first correct rules for measuring heights with the help of a barometer.

Based on his experiments in 1772, Deluc advocated the use of mercury, instead of alcohol or other fluids, in thermometers, as its volume varies the most linearly with the method of mixtures. In detail, if two portions of water of equal masses A, B were mixed, and let the resulting water be C, and if we immerse a thermometer in A, B, C, we obtain lengths $l_A, l_B, l_C$. Deluc expected that $l_C = \frac 12 (l_A + l_B)$, and similarly for other ratios of mixtures. He found that thermometers made using mercury allowed the closest fit to his expectation of linearity.

In 1809 he sent a long paper to the Royal Society on separating the chemical from the electrical effect of the dry pile, a form of Voltaic pile, with a description of the electric column and aerial electroscope, in which he advanced opinions contradicting the latest discoveries of the day; they were deemed inappropriate to admit into the Transactions. The dry column described by Deluc was constructed by various scientists and his improvement of the dry pile has been regarded as his most important work, although he was not in fact its inventor. He was a valued mentor to the young Francis Ronalds, who published several papers on dry piles in 1814–15.

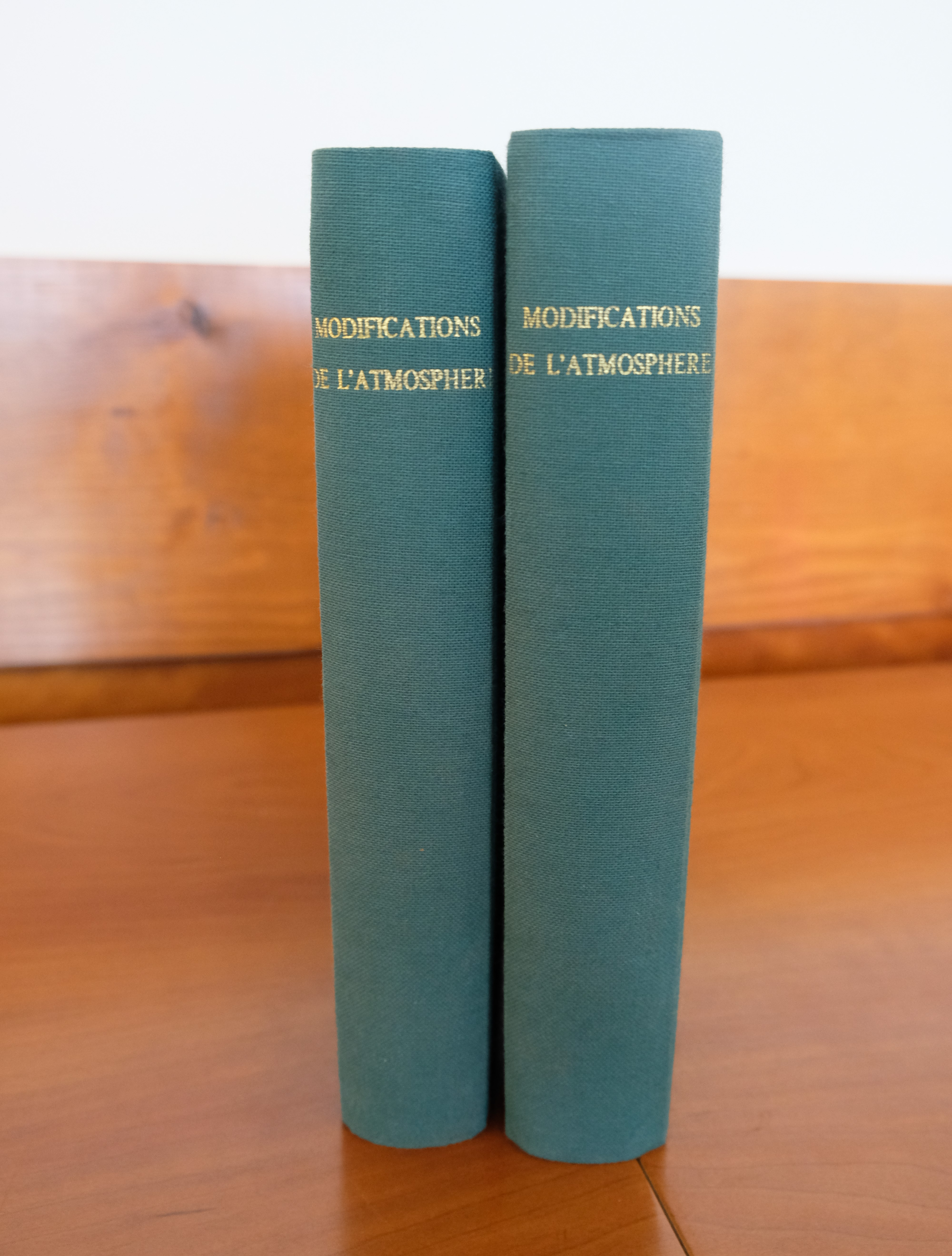
1772 copy of volumes 1 and 2 of "Recherches sur les modifications de l'atmosphère"

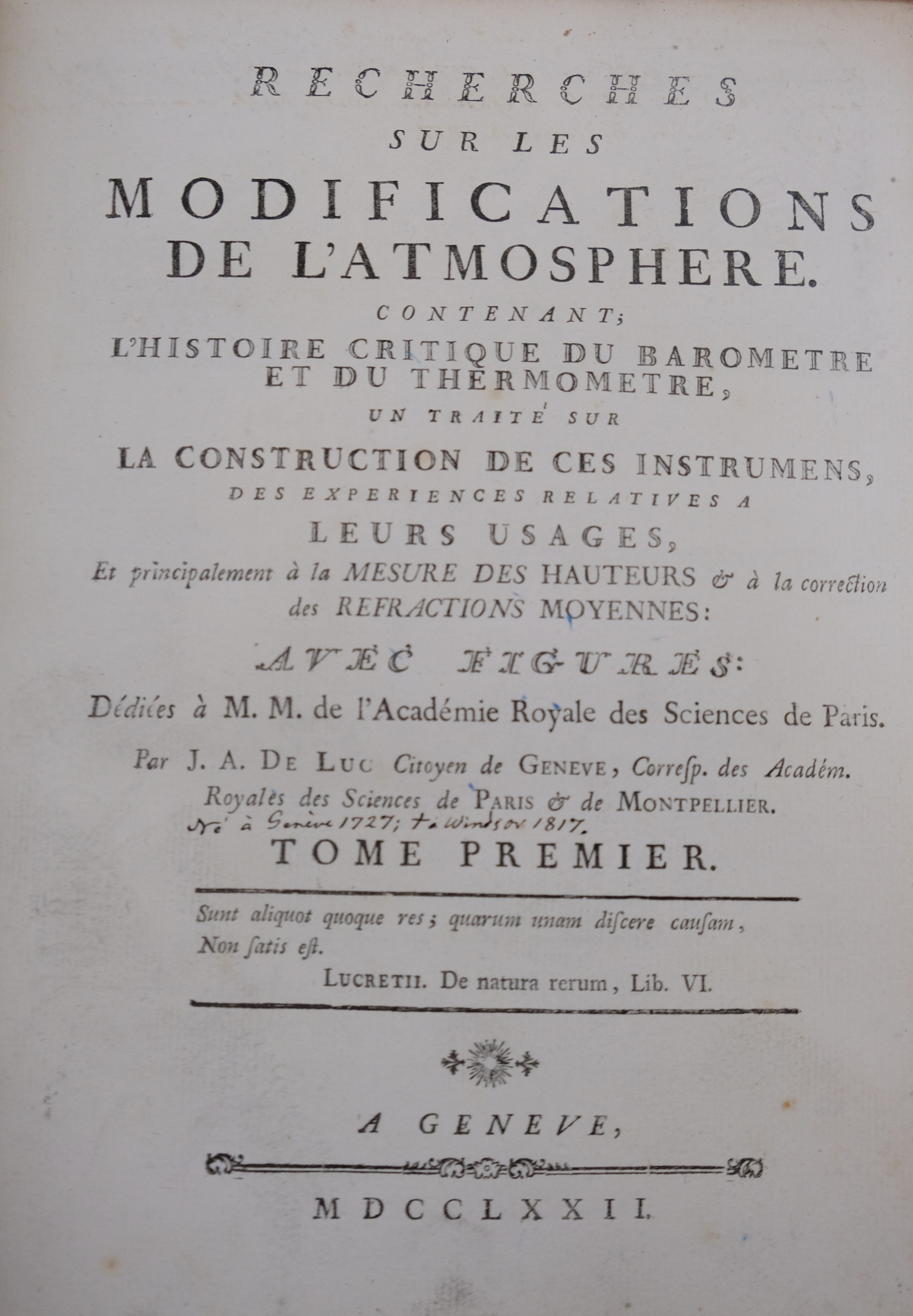
Title page of a 1772 copy of volume 1 of "Recherches sur les modifications de l'atmosphère"

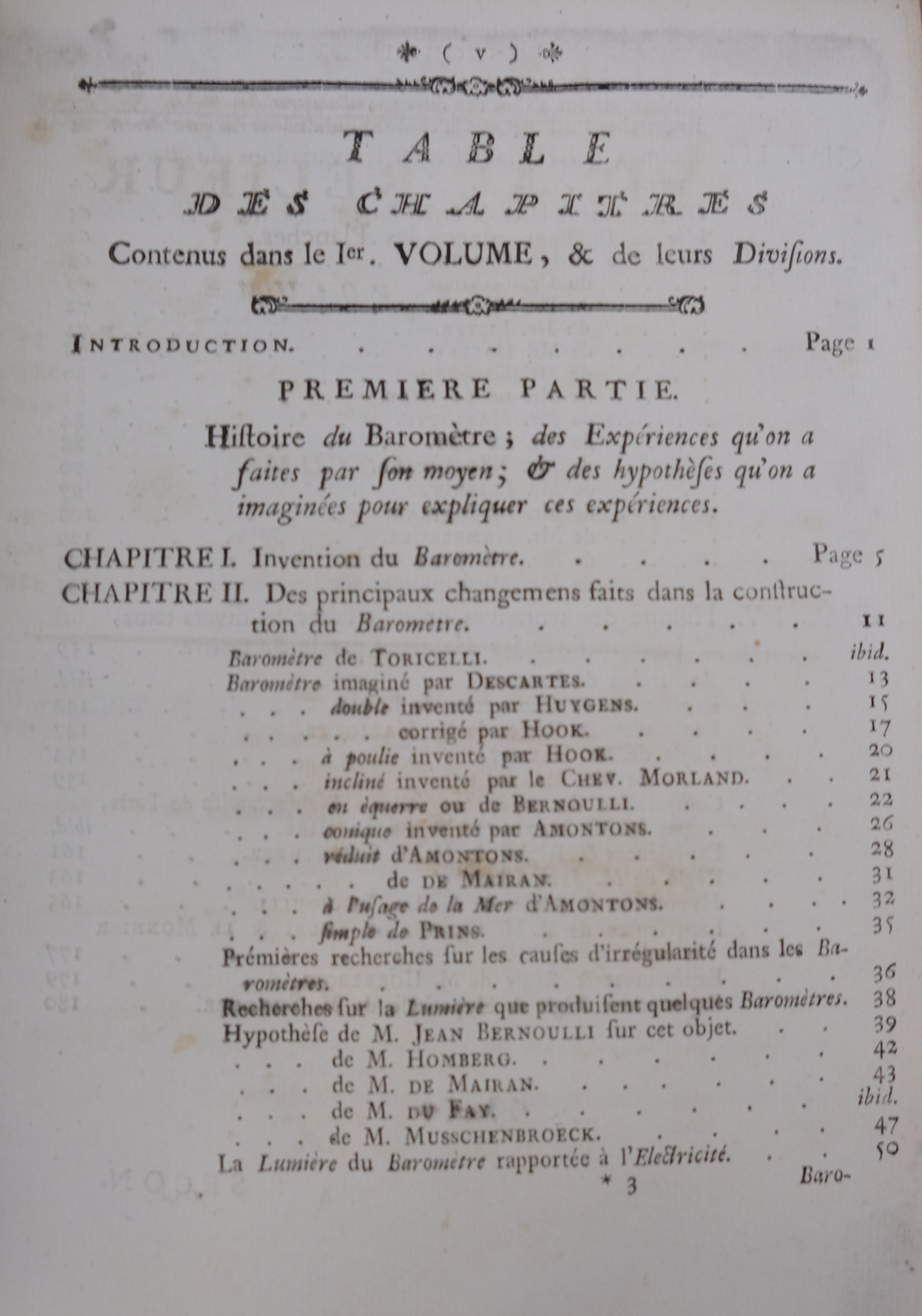
Table of contents page of a 1772 copy of volume 1 of "Recherches sur les modifications de l'atmosphère"

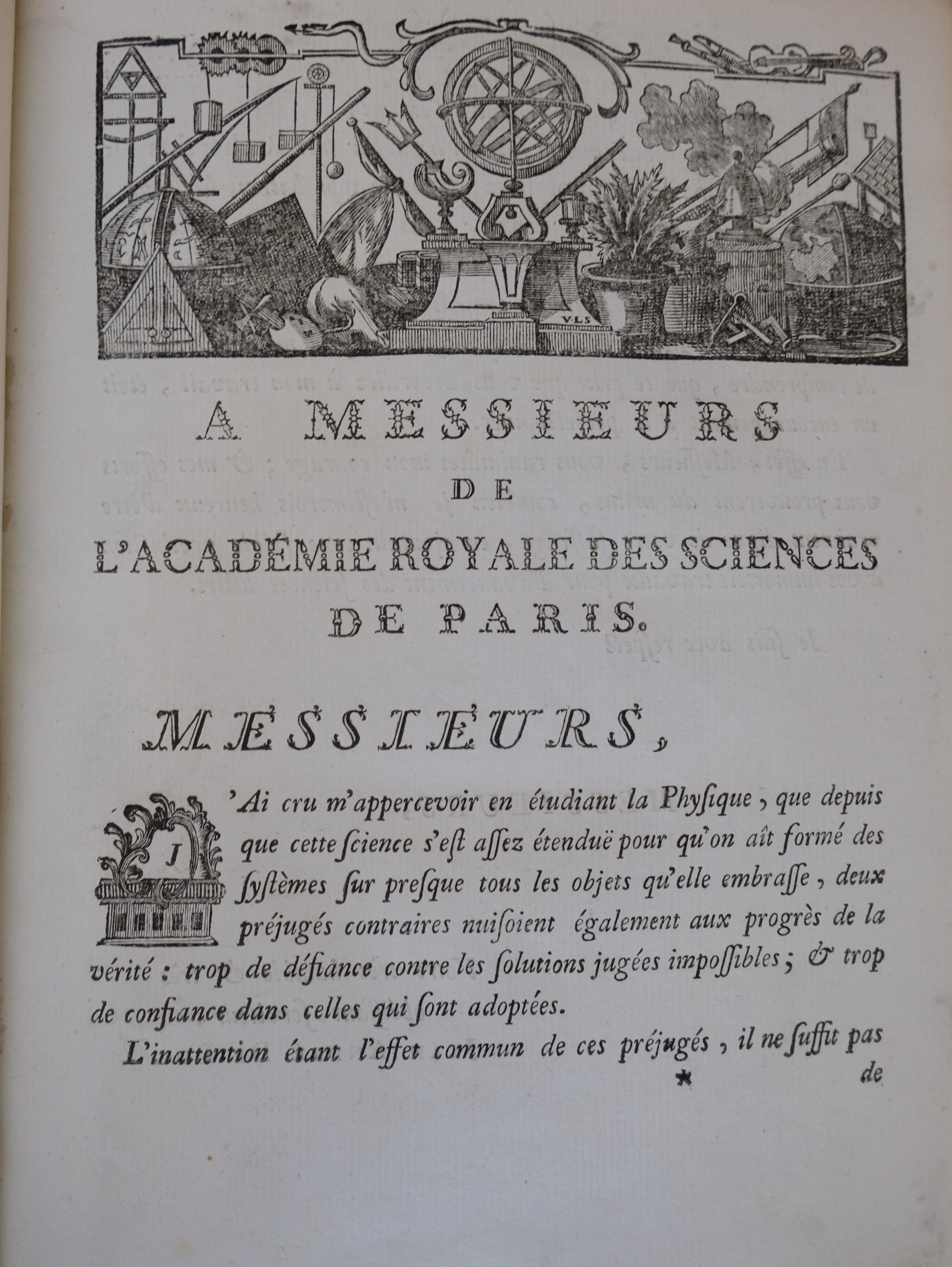
Dedication to a 1772 copy of volume 1 of "Recherches sur les modifications de l'atmosphère"

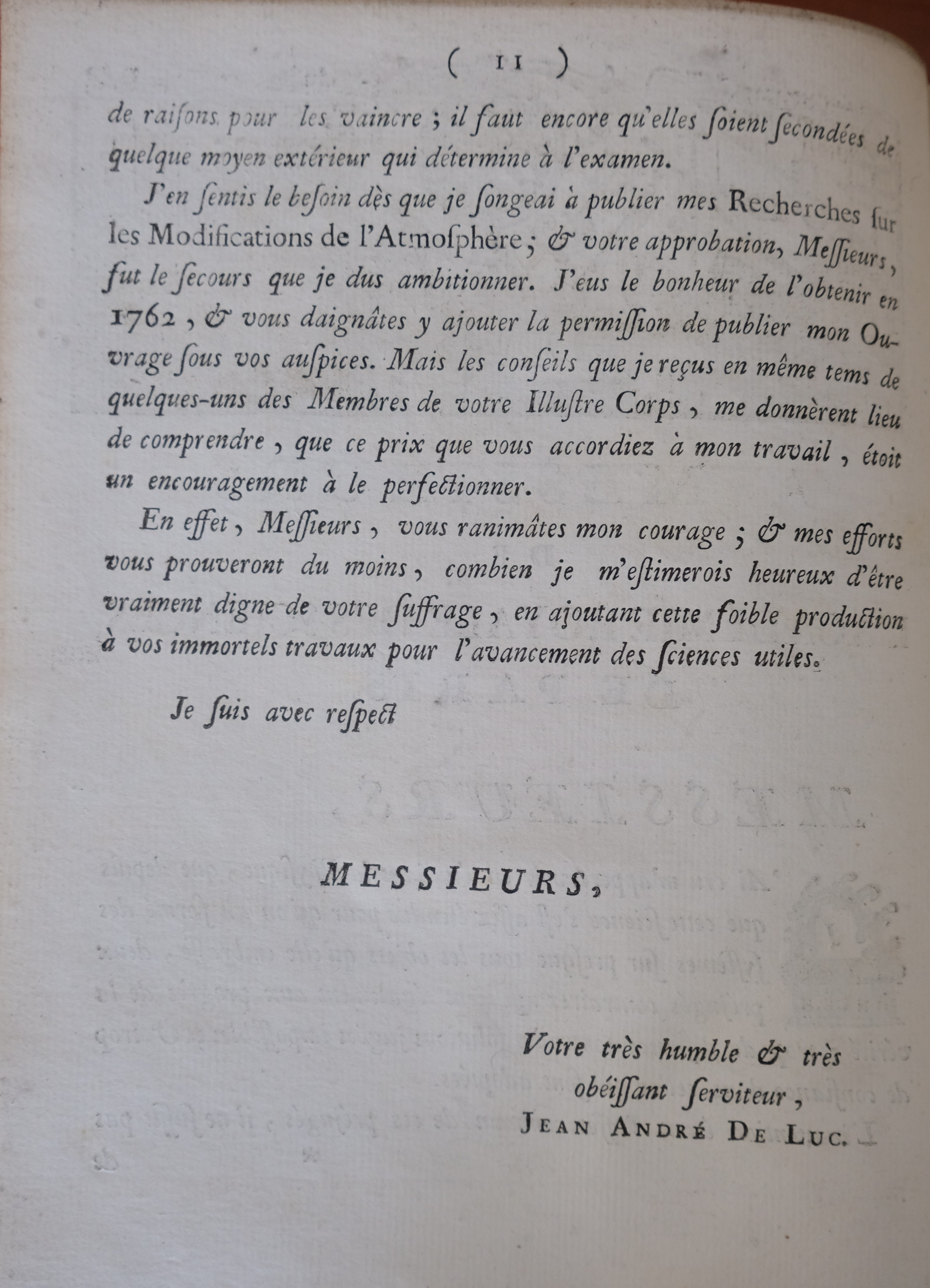
Dedication to a 1772 copy of volume 1 of "Recherches sur les modifications de l'atmosphère"

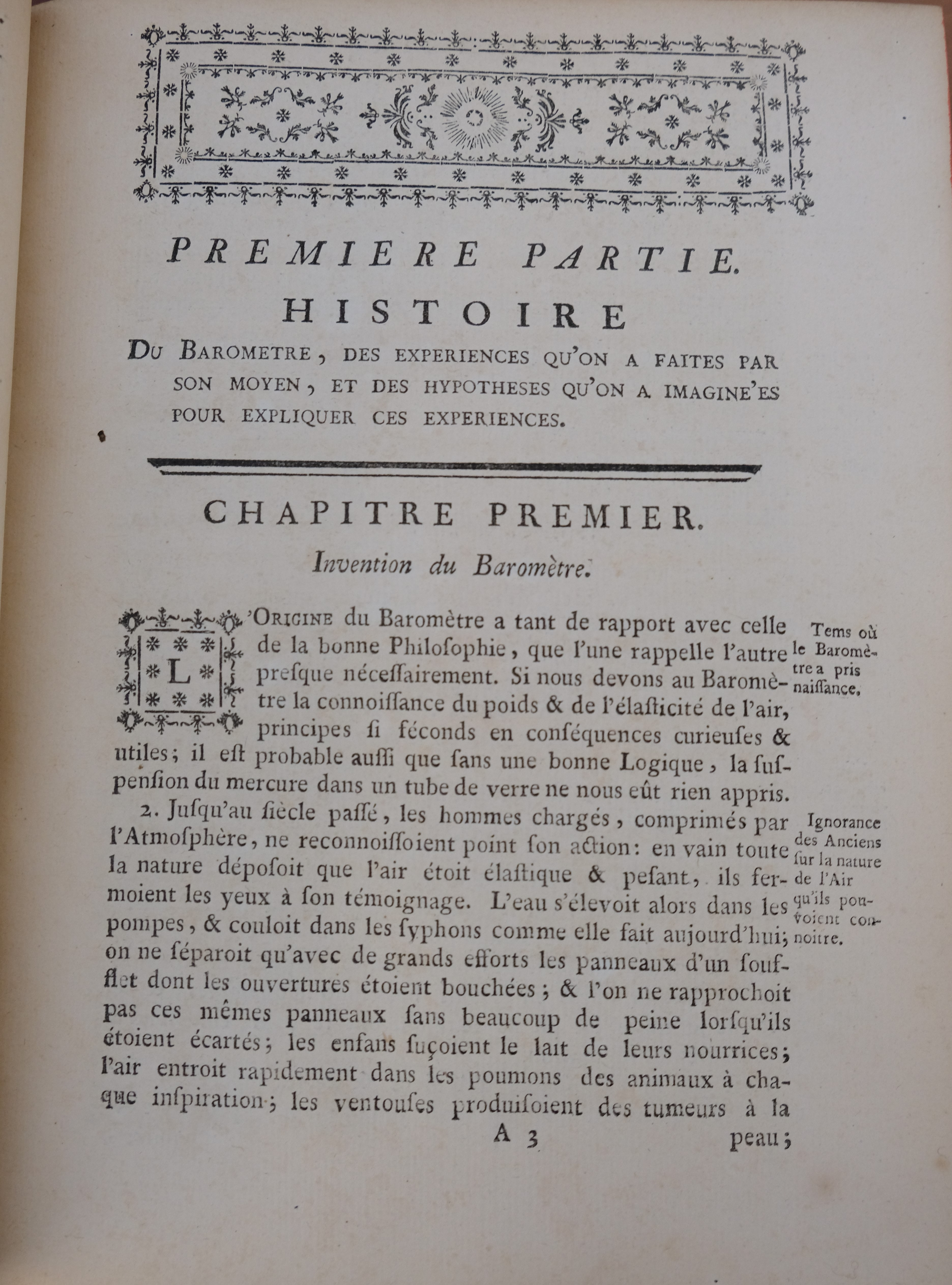
First page of a 1772 copy of volume 1 of "Recherches sur les modifications de l'atmosphère"

=== Scriptural and observational data ===
The last decades of Deluc's life were occupied with theological considerations. In his controversy with Hutton, "while never arguing that Hutton was an atheist, Deluc did accuse him of failing to counter atheism sufficiently".

He took care in reconciling observational data and the Scriptures considered as a description of the history of the world. In his Lettres physiques et morales he explained the six days of the creation as epochs preceding the current state of the globe, and attributed the deluge to the filling up of cavities in the interior of the earth.

The subject is discussed at length by Martina Kölbl-Ebert in Geology and Religion.

== See also ==
- History of geology#18th century
- Plutonism

== Bibliography ==
=== Selection ===
- "Account of a new hygrometer", Philosophical Transactions, 63/2, 1773, p. 404–460.
- "Barometrical observations on the depth of the mines in the Hartz", Philosophical Transactions, 67/2, 1777, p. 401–550.
- An essay on pyrometry and areometry and on physical measures in general, London, Nichols, 1778–79 (2 vols).
- An elementary treatise on geology, p. PR1, at Google Books (1809); translated by Henry De La Fite (d. 1831).
- Geological travels, London, 1810–11 (3 vols): Travels in the north of Europe (vol. 1); Travels in England (vols 2 & 3).
- Experiments concerning the electric machine: showing the electric effects of frictions between bodies, London, 1811.
- Geological travels in some parts of France, Switzerland, and Germany: vol. 1 (1813) (nos. 1–453), vol. 2 (1813) (nos. 454–844), vol. 3 (1811) (nos. 935–1417) on Google Books
- Letters on the physical theory of the earth, addressed to Professor Blumenbach, London, 1831 (With introductory remarks and illustrations by Henry De La Fite).

=== Lists of online works ===
- List of online works on e-rara.ch. (in French and German)
- Articles published in the Philosophical Transactions of the Royal Society. (in French)
- Jean-André Deluc (1779–1780) Lettres physiques et morales sur l'histoire de la terre et de l'homme, 5 vol. – digital facsimile from the Linda Hall Library
- Jean-André Deluc (1810–1811) Geological Travels. 3 vol. (English) – digital facsimile from the Linda Hall Library

== Sources ==
- Harrison, William Jerome. "Deluc, Jean André" . Dictionary of National Biography. London: Smith, Elder & Co. 1885–1900.
- Heilbron, John L.; Sigrist, René (ed.). Jean-André Deluc, historian of earth and man. Geneva: Slatkine 2011.
- Michaud, Joseph-François; Michaud, Louis Gabriel. "Luc (Jean-André de)". Biographie universelle, ancienne et moderne, vol. 25. 1820
- Sigrist, René. Jean-André Deluc. Historical Dictionary of Switzerland (in French). Also available in German and Italian.
