= Maginus (crater) =

Crater on the Moon

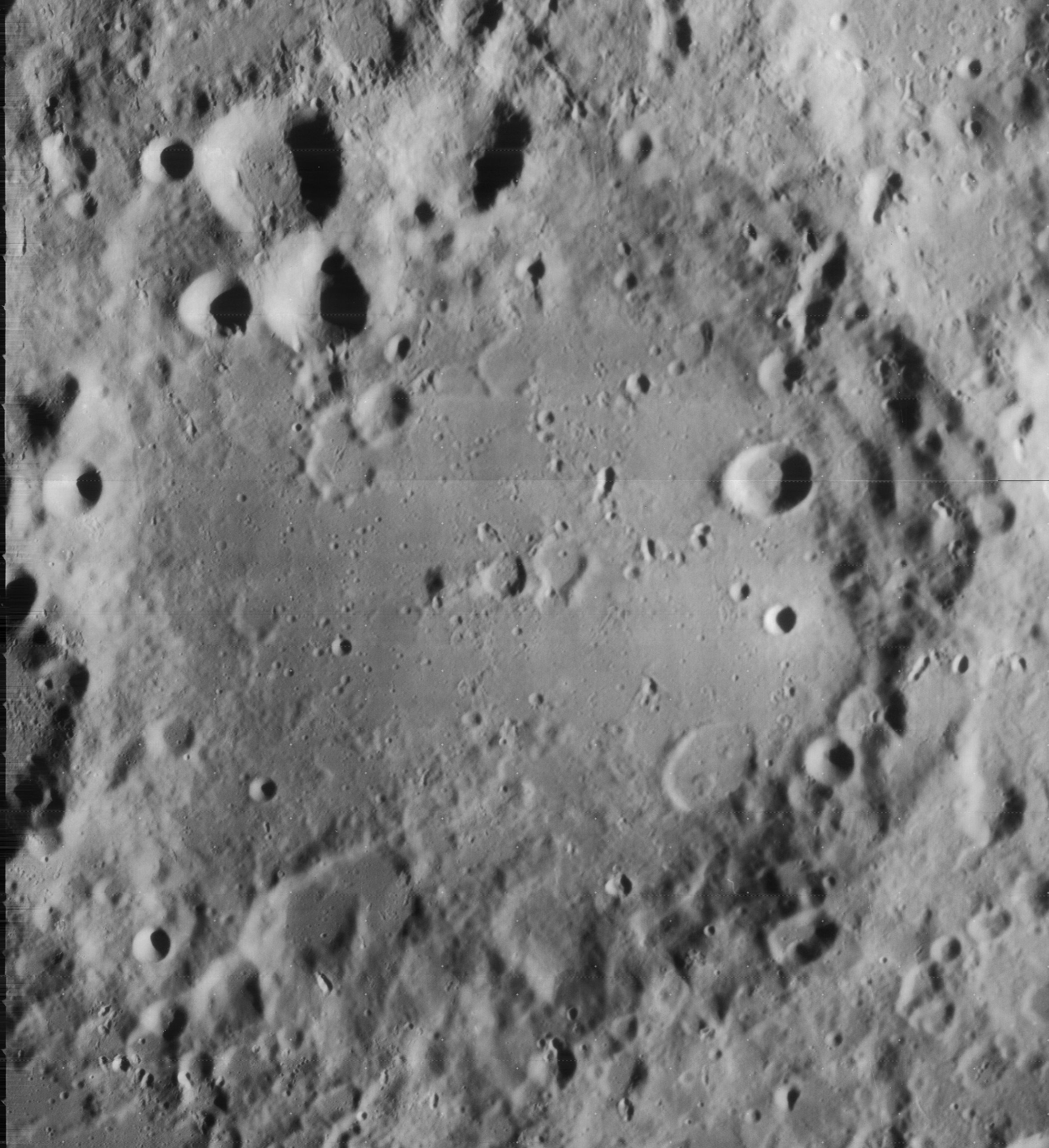
- Lunar Orbiter 4 image
- Coordinates: 50.0°S 6.2°W
- Diameter: 194 km
- Depth: 4.3 km
- Colongitude: 7° at sunrise
- Formation: Pre-Nectarian
- Eponym: Giovanni A. Magini

Maginus is an ancient lunar impact crater located in the southern highlands to the southeast of the prominent crater Tycho. It is a large formation almost three quarters the diameter of Clavius, which lies to the southwest. Just to the north of Maginus is the smaller crater Proctor, and to the southeast is Deluc.

T. W. Webb called it "the ruin of a vast complex ring". The rim of Maginus is heavily eroded, with impact-formed incisions, and multiple overlapping craters across the eastern side. The wall is broken through in the southeast by Maginus C, a worn crater. Little remains of the original features that formed the rim of Maginus, and it no longer possesses an outer rampart. The floor is relatively flat, with a pair of low central peaks.

== Satellite craters ==
By convention these features are identified on lunar maps by placing the letter on the side of the crater midpoint that is closest to Maginus.

Maginus	Latitude	Longitude	Diameter
A	48.8° S	4.4° W	14 km
B	52.4° S	6.2° W	12 km
C	51.7° S	9.4° W	42 km
D	47.9° S	2.2° W	40 km
E	49.0° S	1.4° W	37 km
F	48.9° S	8.2° W	18 km
G	48.0° S	7.6° W	23 km
H	52.5° S	10.0° W	15 km
J	49.9° S	2.8° W	8 km
K	47.4° S	3.9° W	31 km
L	49.2° S	8.9° W	11 km
M	50.4° S	9.3° W	10 km
N	48.5° S	9.0° W	24 km
O	50.6° S	12.6° W	12 km
P	50.7° S	11.8° W	10 km
Q	50.8° S	2.3° W	9 km
R	48.9° S	10.4° W	9 km
S	49.7° S	1.4° W	13 km
T	52.3° S	7.1° W	6 km
U	47.4° S	8.2° W	9 km
V	49.3° S	7.3° W	9 km
W	49.3° S	7.8° W	8 km
X	51.3° S	7.6° W	7 km
Y	51.8° S	9.1° W	7 km
Z	50.2° S	3.6° W	18 km
