= Proctor (Martian crater) =

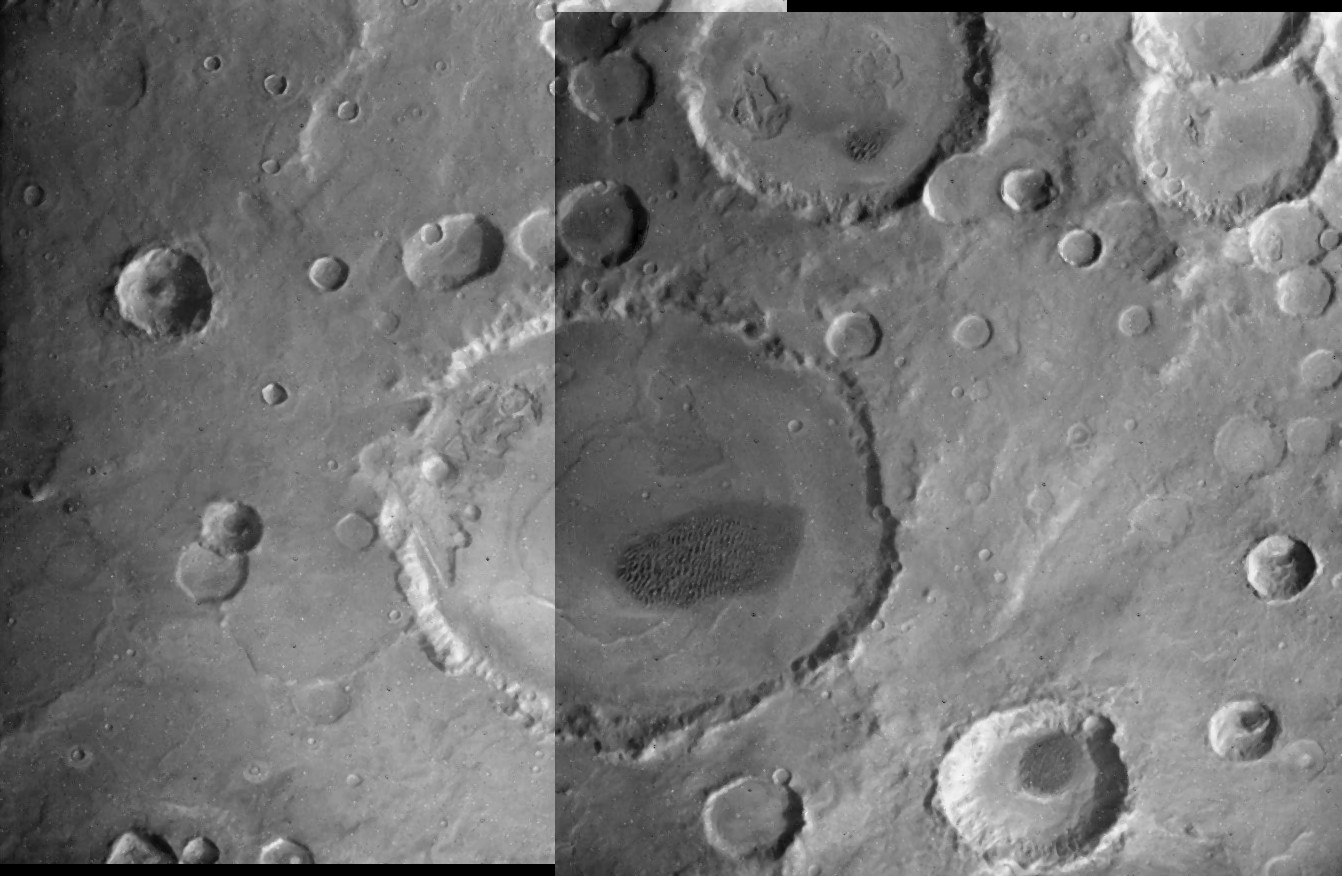
- Viking Orbiter 1 mosaic
- Planet: Mars
- Region: Noachis Terra
- Coordinates: 48°S 330.5°W
- Quadrangle: Noachis
- Diameter: 172.56 km (107.22 mi)
- Eponym: Richard A. Proctor

Proctor is a large crater in the Noachis quadrangle of Mars. It was named in 1973 after Richard A. Proctor, a British astronomer (1837–1888).

== Dune fields ==
The crater contains a 35 x 65 km dark dune field. It was one of the first sand dune fields ever recognized on Mars based on Mariner 9 images. The crater's dunes are being monitored by HiRISE to identify changes over time.

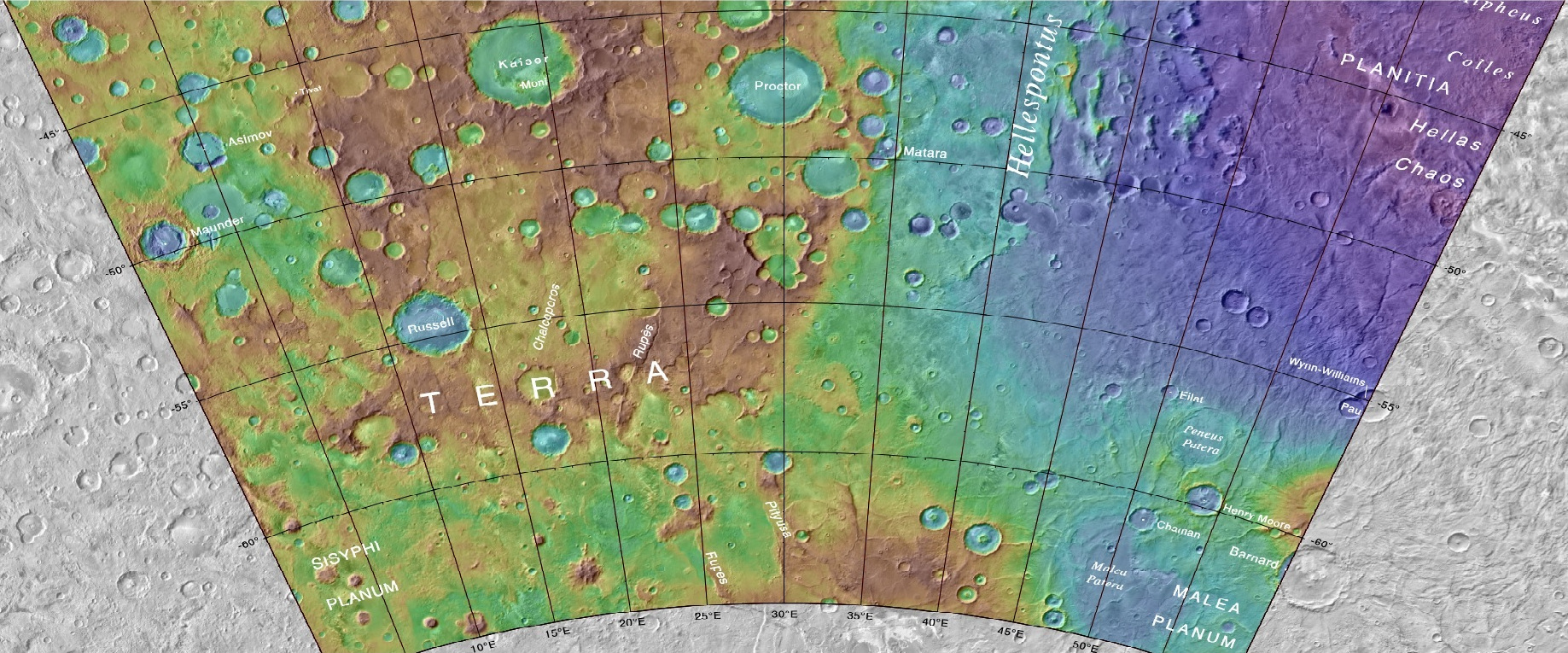
Topographical map showing location of Proctor crater and other nearby craters

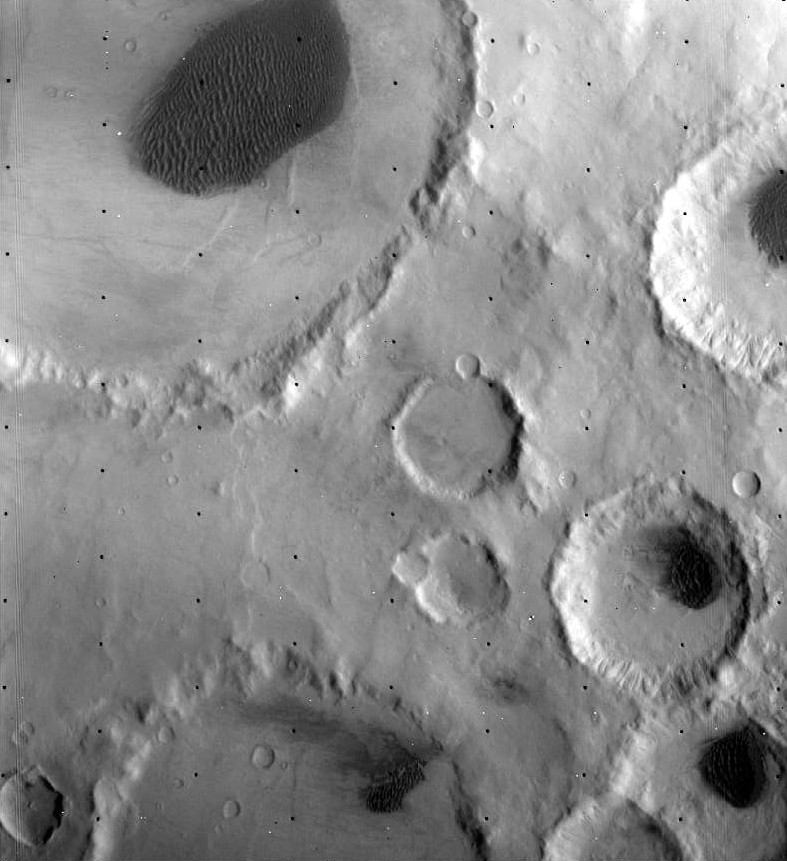
Another Viking image of the dunes in Proctor and in nearby craters

Proctor crater transverse aeolian ridges and Dunes, as seen by HiRISE

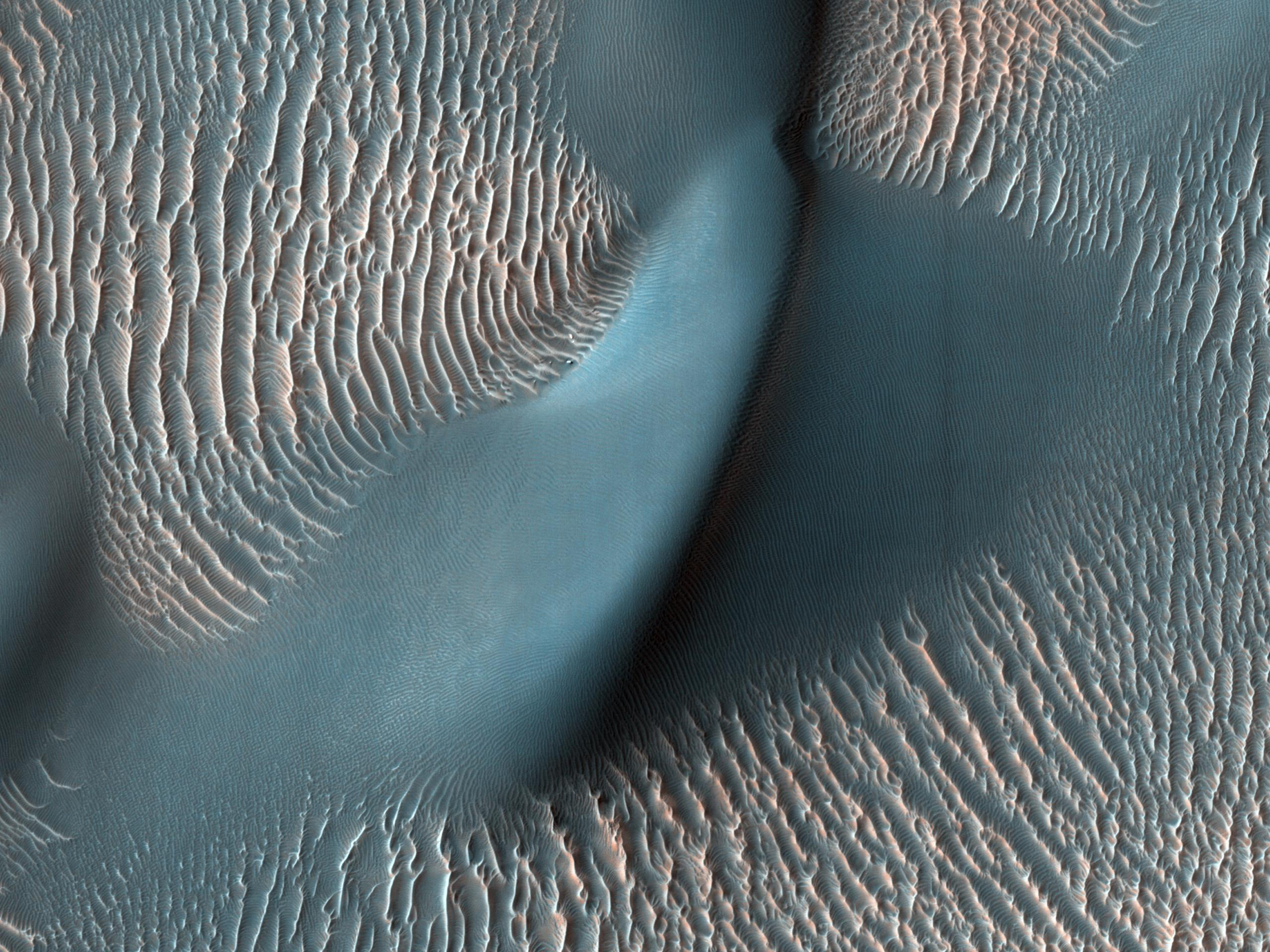
HiRISE image of the crater with transverse aeolian ridges surrounding a large dune

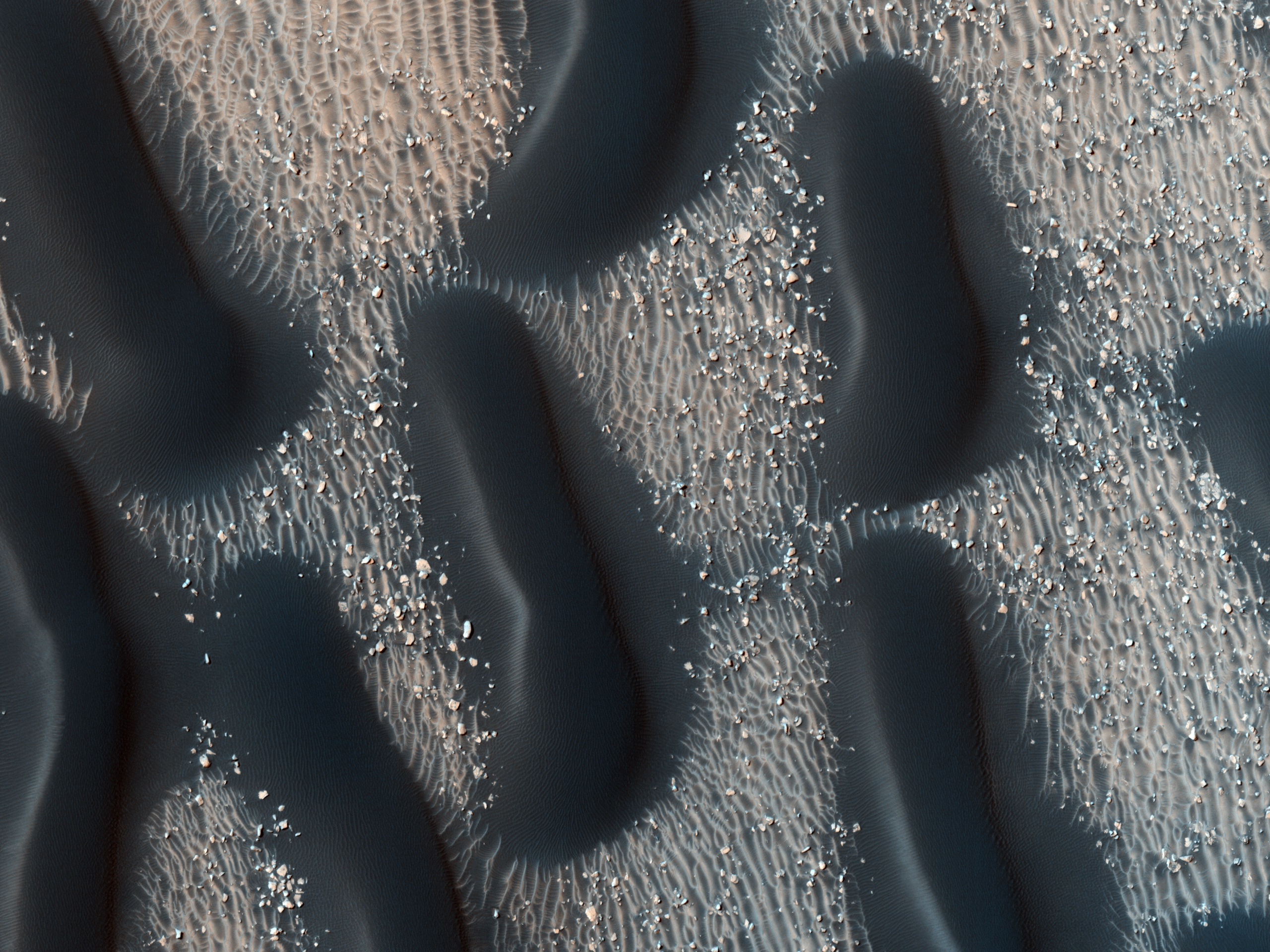
The edge of a dark dune field on the floor of Proctor crater

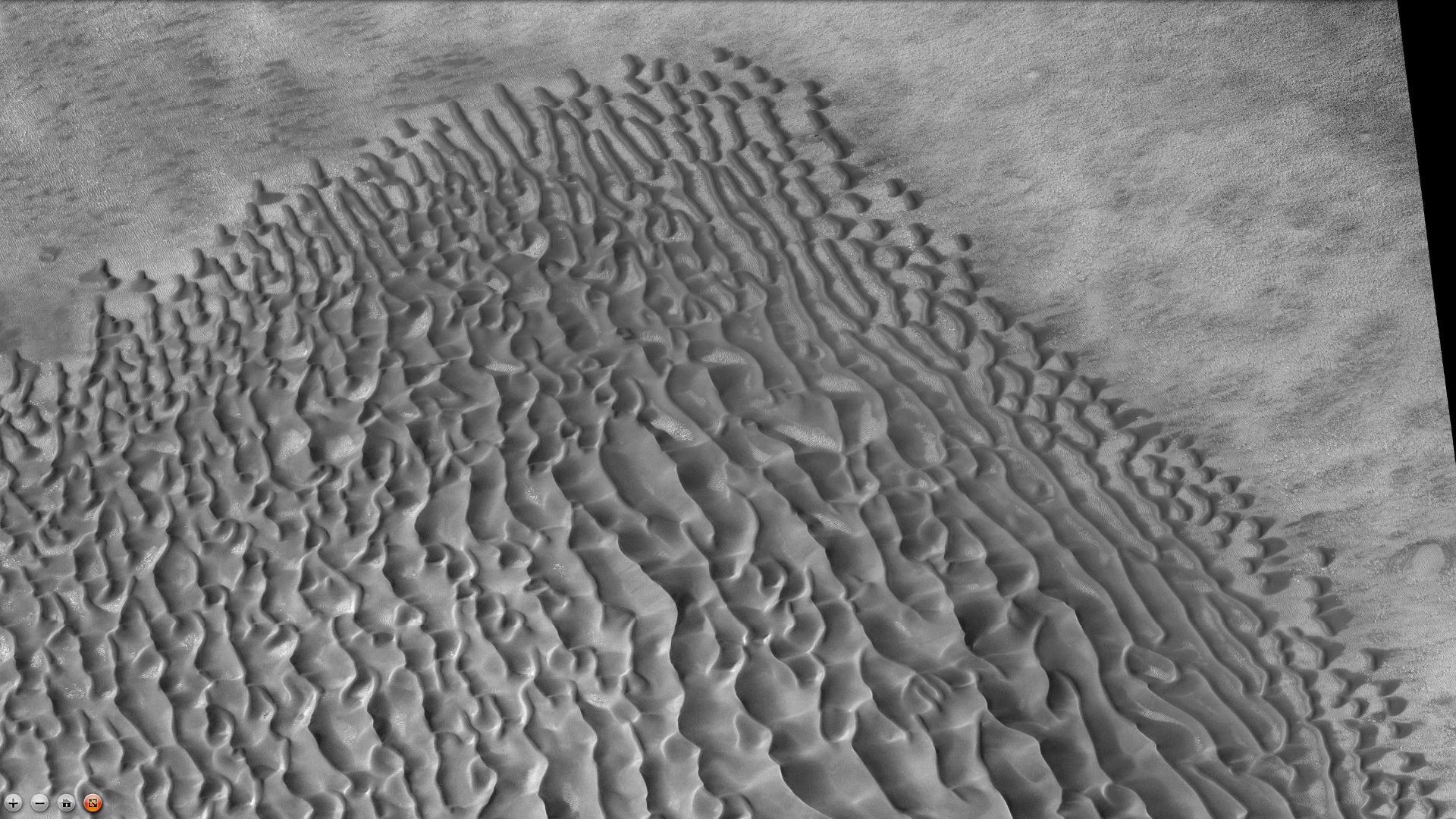
Dune field on floor of Proctor crater, as seen by CTX camera on Mars Reconnaissance Orbiter.

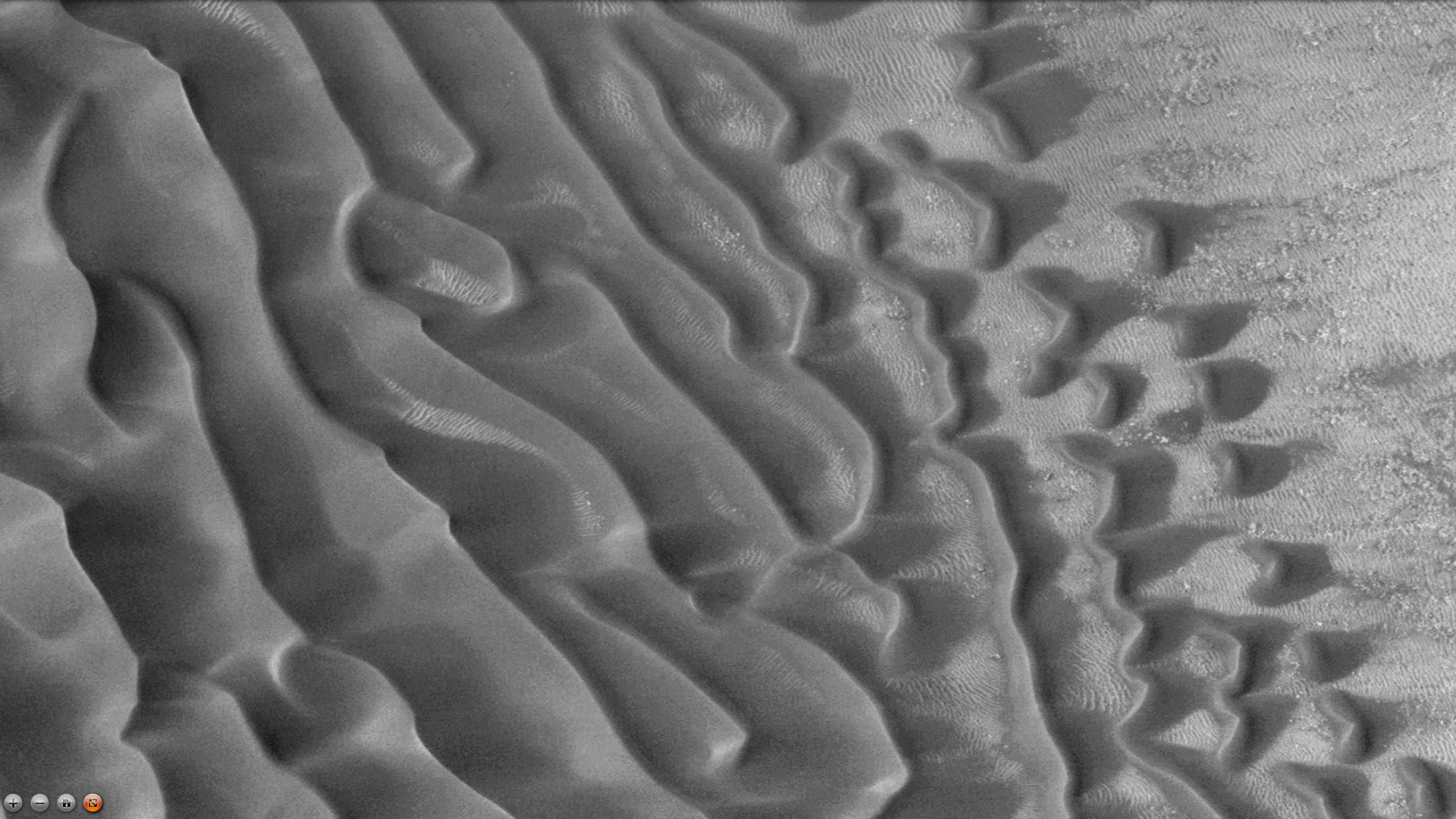
Close-up of dunes on floor of Proctor crater, as seen by CTX camera on Mars Reconnaissance Orbiter. This is an enlargement of part of previous image.

== See also ==
- List of craters on Mars: O-Z
