= Deluc (crater) =

Crater on the Moon

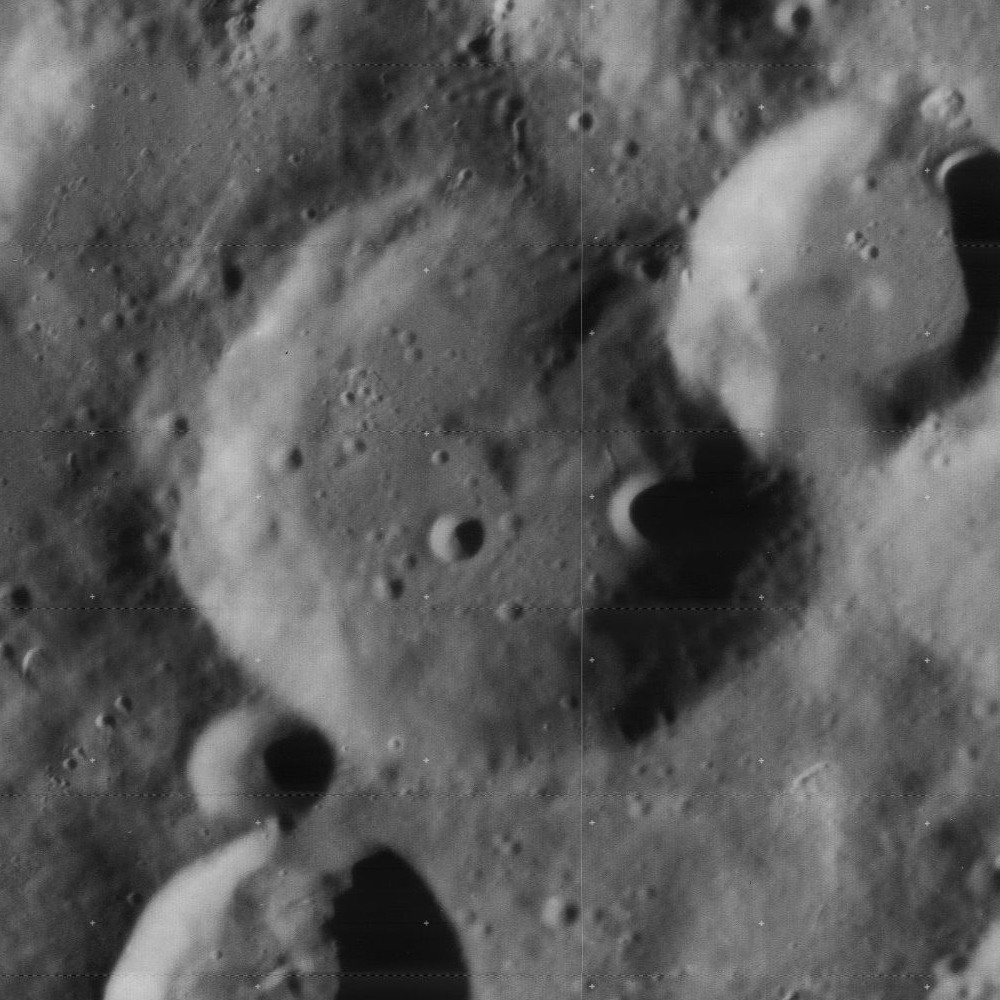
- Lunar Orbiter 4 image
- Coordinates: 55.0°S 2.8°W
- Diameter: 42.50 km (26.41 mi)
- Depth: 3.3 km (2.1 mi)
- Colongitude: 4° at sunrise
- Eponym: Jean-André Deluc

Deluc is a lunar impact crater that lies in the southern highlands of the Moon. It is located to the south-southeast of the crater Maginus, and west-northwest of the huge Clavius. Due east of Deluc is the somewhat larger crater Lilius. It is 42.5 kilometers in diameter and 3.3 kilometers deep.

This formation dates from the Pre-Nectarian period of the lunar geologic timescale, which lasted from 4.55 to 3.85 billion years ago. This is a relatively worn formation with the satellite crater Deluc H intruding into the northeast rim. A triangular bulge of material covers the floor from the rim of this intruding crater to near the midpoint of the interior. The small craterlet Deluc T is attached to the southern outer rim of Deluc, and joins it to the small Deluc D to the south.

The remaining rim of Deluc is not quite circular, having a slight outward bulge to the northwest. The interior is worn and smoothed from a history of tiny impacts, although the edge is still well-defined. There is a tiny craterlet in the east part of the interior, but most of the remainder of the floor is level and marked only by tiny impacts.

The crater is named for Swiss geologist and physicist Jean-André Deluc (1727-1817). His name was included in the lunar nomenclature of Johann H. von Mädler in the 1870s. Its designation was officially adopted by the International Astronomical Union in 1935.

== Satellite craters ==
By convention these features are identified on lunar maps by placing the letter on the side of the crater midpoint that is closest to Deluc.

Deluc	Latitude	Longitude	Diameter
A	54.1° S	0.4° W	56 km
B	52.0° S	0.5° E	38 km
C	51.4° S	0.9° E	28 km
D	56.4° S	2.4° W	27 km
E	60.3° S	4.3° W	12 km
F	60.0° S	3.1° W	38 km
G	61.6° S	0.7° E	27 km
H	54.2° S	2.1° W	26 km
J	53.3° S	4.1° W	33 km
L	60.8° S	6.2° E	8 km
M	54.9° S	6.2° W	19 km
N	60.6° S	0.5° E	10 km
O	62.7° S	4.4° W	7 km
P	58.9° S	4.8° W	7 km
Q	59.0° S	3.5° W	5 km
R	55.4° S	0.6° E	22 km
S	61.9° S	0.2° E	6 km
T	55.8° S	3.1° W	10 km
U	59.0° S	2.9° W	5 km
V	61.8° S	1.7° E	9 km
W	61.6° S	1.8° W	6 km
