= Proctor (lunar crater) =

Crater on the Moon

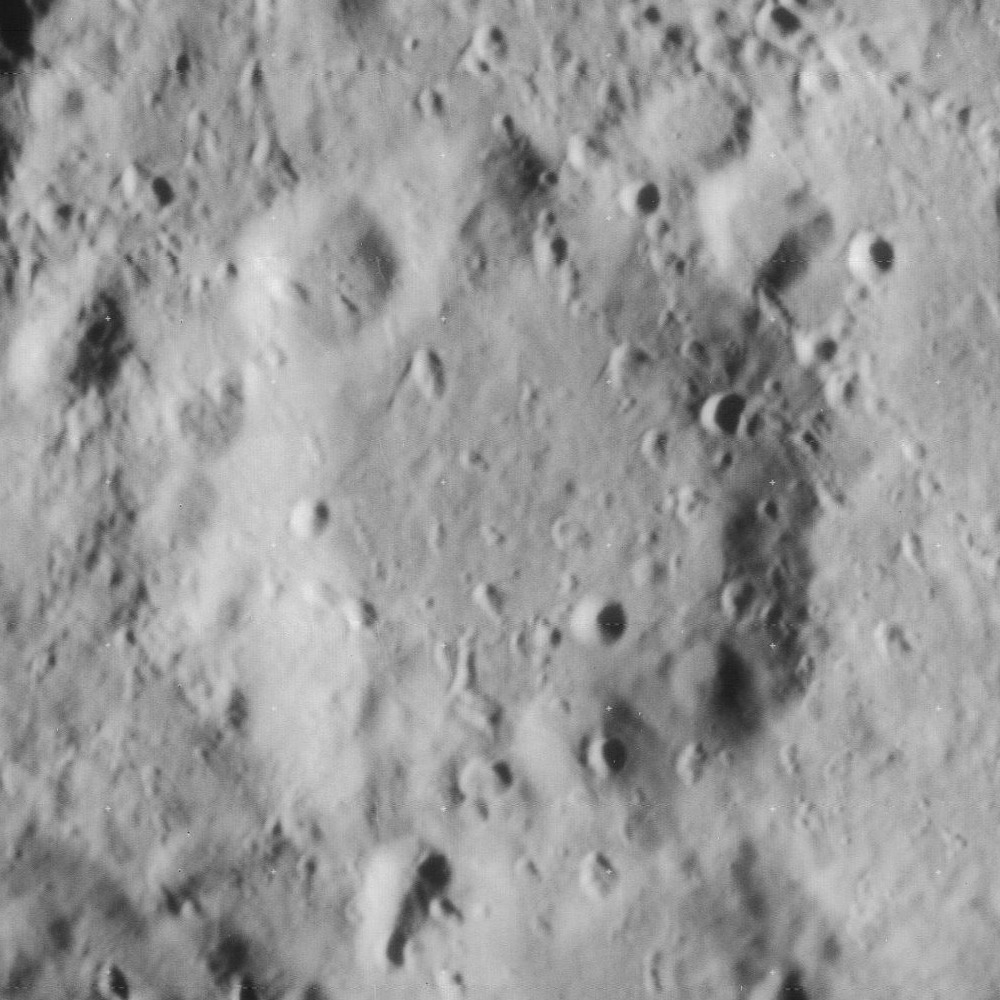
- Lunar Orbiter 4 image
- Coordinates: 46.4°S 5.1°W
- Diameter: 52 km
- Depth: 1.3 km
- Colongitude: 6° at sunrise
- Eponym: Mary Proctor

Proctor is the remnant of a lunar impact crater that is located to the southeast of the prominent crater Tycho. It lies just to the north of the huge walled plain named Maginus. To the north is the crater Saussure and to the northwest, just to the east of Tycho, lies Pictet. Proctor is 52 kilometers (32 mi) in diameter and its walls are 1,300 meters (4,300 ft) high. It is from the Pre-Imbrian period, which lasted from 4.55 to 3.85 billion years ago.

The outer rim of this crater has become heavily worn and eroded, and now forms a low, irregular rise around the interior floor. Much of the northwestern half of the rim is marked by a number of small craters, including Proctor D. The interior floor is somewhat level and is marked only by a few tiny impacts.

The crater is named after the 20th-century American astronomy writer Mary Proctor.

== Satellite craters ==
By convention these features are identified on lunar maps by placing the letter on the side of the crater midpoint that is closest to Proctor.

Proctor	Latitude	Longitude	Diameter
A	47.0° S	6.7° W	8 km
B	46.4° S	6.7° W	8 km
C	47.7° S	6.6° W	5 km
D	46.1° S	6.0° W	12 km
E	45.4° S	5.1° W	8 km
F	47.7° S	5.2° W	7 km
G	47.7° S	4.8° W	7 km
H	45.7° S	2.5° W	5 km
