= Bible woman =

Type of female evangelist

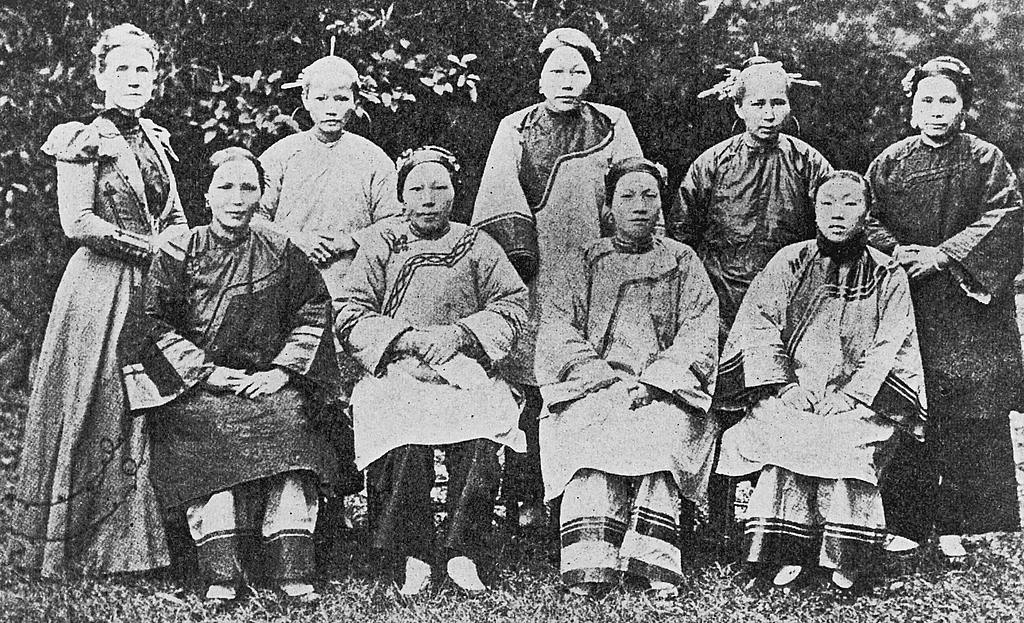
Bible women in the Foochow Mission, China, 1902

In missions history, a Bible woman was a local woman who supported foreign female missionaries in their Christian evangelistic and social work.

== Background ==
The title "Bible woman" was first used in London in connection with a female evangelist, Ellen Henrietta Ranyard, who put effort to reach sick and poor women in the poorest area of London in the mid-nineteenth century. Ranyard's heart was heavily burdened with the poor condition of women in St. Giles district that she decided to start an evangelistic work among them. Ranyard found a Christian woman who had a similar life as such and hired the woman to go with her to the poorest district in London to evangelize and help the sick women there. The woman who had the similar life as her recipients would freely visit the poor women and read the Bible to their hearings. She also distributed the Bible and tracts to the area, this is why she was called Bible woman. From this little seed, sprang Ranyard's mission. In 1879, there were about 170 Bible women employed in the mission. After Ellen Ranyard's death in 1879, her work was continued as the London Bible and Domestic Female Mission. The idea of "Bible women" did not stay in her home of origin, in London, but spread throughout England, Scotland, and it travelled to Asia, Africa, and rest of the non-western world with women missionaries. An English example was Ann Baker (1834–1913), who served in the district which later became the Church of England parish of Emmanuel in Cheltenham, where there is a plaque in the church marking her 46 years of service.

At the beginning of the nineteenth century, the creation of many interdenominational mission organizations was influenced by the Evangelical revivals, anti-slavery movements, and free trade theories, especially in Britain. The urge to preach the gospel to individuals shifted to nations and was motivated not only by religious zeal but was also inspired by Enlightenment ideology (which saw liberation and salvation of the world as an equal) to improve one's self to contribute the global progress. In this context, Protestant missionary women from the western world became increasingly interested in mission and trained themselves as educators, doctors, nurses, and other professionals to join in the mission work. They played a central role in mission fields as doctors, nurses, and teachers; they ran schools, hospitals and orphanages for children, etc. By the beginning of the twentieth century, most of the missionaries operating in the mission field were women.

== Role ==
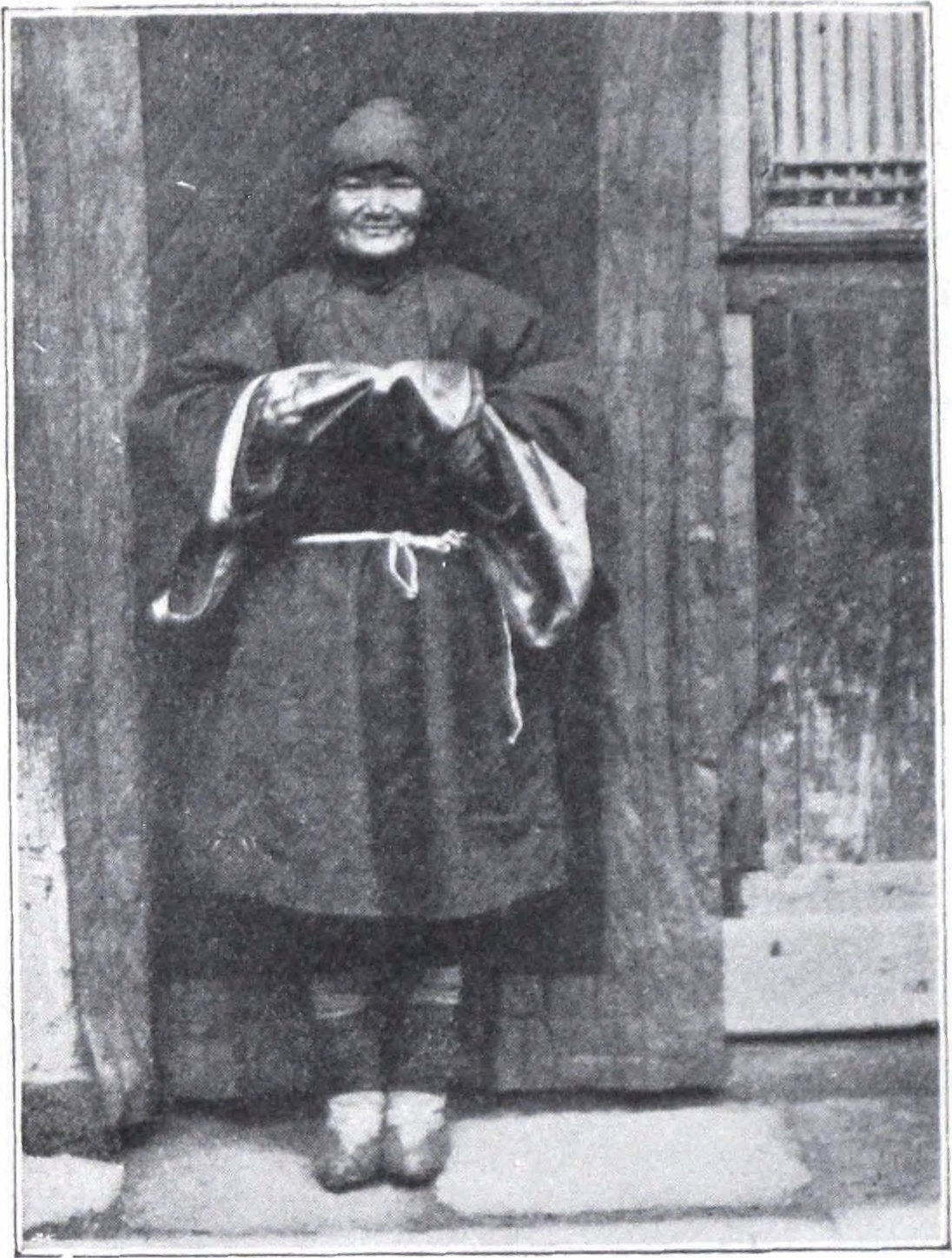
Mrs. Chao, a Bible-woman at Sin-tien-tsï (near Paoning) working for China Inland Mission's Anglican section in Sichuan

In the mission field, "Bible women" or "Bible readers" were local indigenous women. Initially, Bible women were recruited from domestic workers in missionary homes, from the wives and mothers of indigenous male evangelists, or graduates from missionary girl's schools. The majority of them held lower social status in their respective countries. They were either supported by female missionaries or by local churches but were usually the lowest paid or even sometimes they were unpaid. These local Christian women helped the British missionaries, especially female missionaries to perform their daily tasks and to accomplish their mission goal. Ruth Tucker argues that "without Bible Women, female missionaries would have been at a loss."

== Ministry ==
Accompanying western missionaries on their missions were a significant part of Bible women ministry, but on many occasions, they served alone or in teams without any direct assistance from the missionaries. Their ministry was wide in its range: they openly shared their faith with their fellow women, read the Bible in communities, taught children in village schools, called on the sick or troubled, worked among girls, and visited women in their homes. Bible women served as evangelists not only in their homelands but also in foreign settings. In the beginning of the 20th century, there were a number of Korean Bible women in Manchuria, Japan, and Hawaii sharing Bible stories with women and children, as well as Chinese Bible women such as Dora Yu in Korea, engaged in educational, medical, and evangelistic work. Bible women also itinerated in villages to distribute and sell Bibles, tracts, and religious literature.

In 1913, thirty-six Bible women were employed by the British and Foreign Bible Society for the purpose of helping distribute scripture, and this practice continued with other Bible societies. Even though there were few who wished to buy the Bible, Bible women were successful in winning women for the Gospel. The Bible women were more effective in their evangelistic task than that of missionary women because they had open access to local women, girls, and children. In addition, they did not have a language barrier as most of the missionaries did have. Although Bible women focused on ministering to other women, occasionally, there were opportunities to minister to men as well.

== Training ==
Initially, Bible women were trained by women missionaries on an individual basis. They were taught the Bible, but on occasion, they were taught nursing, writing, homemaking, and health. However, in later years, the number of Bible women increased and female training schools were opened: in China, alone, forty girls' schools were running in 1900. Bible women were trained as Bible teachers, nurses, and healthcare providers. Bible women who had a solid foundation in biblical studies were trained to be Bible teachers.

In Sudan, Bible women used a book entitled One Hundred Lessons from the Bible that took the student through the Bible in outlined studies that involved answering questions and memorizing verses. Following the one hundred lessons, there was a "Way of Salvation" series that was geared to bring the student to a personal commitment to Christ.

Bible women were actively involved in medical ministry too. They were taught basic medical skills by their female medical missionaries and then they worked as nurses and healthcare providers; they cared patients and shared the Gospel with them.

== Today ==
Although Bible women played a major role in evangelizing their fellow women in their countries, they are largely left behind in contemporary study of Christian mission. There are not many records of Bible women today, neither of their successes nor their failures. It is because women were disregarded in their own cultures or may be they were ignored by their western male and female missionaries. Although they were the least known evangelists, Bible women played a major role in spreading Christianity in their homelands and beyond.

== See also ==
- Women in Christianity
- Zenana missions
