= Arthur Cowper Ranyard =

English astrophysicist

Arthur Cowper Ranyard (21 June 1845 – 14 December 1894) was an English astrophysicist.

== Life ==
Born at Swanscombe, Kent, he was son of Benjamin Ranyard by his wife Ellen Henrietta Ranyard (née White). Ranyard attended University College School, London, from 1857 to 1860, afterwards proceeding to University College. Here the influence of Professor Augustus De Morgan led him to concentrate his attention on mathematics and astronomy, and he formed an intimate friendship with the professor's son George. In 1864 the two friends formed the plan for a society for the special study of mathematics, and issued a circular inviting attendance at the first meeting of "the University College Mathematical Society" on 7 Nov. 1864. The first meeting mentioned in the minutes of the society, however, was held on 16 January 1865, when De Morgan was elected president, and Messrs. Cozens-Hardy and Henry Mason Bompas secretaries. After the president's inaugural address Ranyard read the first paper, 'On Determinants'. The new association received the support of eminent mathematicians, and ultimately developed into the present London Mathematical Society.

Proceeding to Cambridge, Ranyard entered Pembroke College in October 1865, and graduated M.A. in 1868. Adopting the law as his profession, he was called to the bar (Lincoln's Inn) in 1871; but his tastes lay in the direction of science, and his means enabled him to devote much of his time to astronomy. He became a fellow of the Royal Astronomical Society in 1863, was a member of the council (1872–88 and 1892–4), and was secretary (1874–80). He was assistant secretary of the expedition for observing the total solar eclipse of 1870, and made a successful series of polariscopic observations in Sicily. In 1878 he went to Colorado to view the solar eclipse of that year, which he observed and photographed at a station near Denver In 1882 he observed and photographed the total solar eclipse at Sohag in Upper Egypt.

He took an interest in public affairs, and in 1892 was elected a member of the London County Council, where he did important work, especially in connection with the new London Building Act 1894 (57 & 58 Vict. c. ccxiii), which passed into law in the summer of 1894.

In 1872 he made with James Lindsay experiments on photographic irradiation, and in 1886 he investigated the relation between brightness of object, time of exposure, and intensity of photographic action.

Ranyard, who was unmarried, lived a somewhat retired life of laborious industry. He was a man of generous spirit, extremely conscientious, and completely devoted to duty. He died of cancer, at his house in Hunter Street, Brunswick Square, on 14 December 1894. A portrait is given in ‘Knowledge’ for February 1895.

== Works ==
His most extensive work in astronomy was the eclipse volume of the Royal Astronomical Society, in which are systematised and discussed the observations of all solar eclipses down to 1878. It was begun with Sir George Airy, but soon devolved on Ranyard alone. Started in 1871, it was completed in 1879.

In 1888 his friend Richard Anthony Proctor died, leaving his major work, Old and New Astronomy, incomplete, and Ranyard undertook to finish it for the benefit of the author's family. The chapters which are entirely by Ranyard are those on the universe of stars, the construction of the Milky Way, and the distribution of nebulae. He also succeeded Proctor as editor of Knowledge, to which he contributed a long series of articles upon the sun and moon, the milky way, the stellar universe, star-clusters, the density of nebulae, &c. These papers give his mature views on many problems. His most important investigations were those on nebulae, the density of which he concluded to be extremely low, even compared with the Earth's atmosphere, and on star-clusters, which he regarded as showing evidence of the ejection of matter from a centre, and not gradual condensation, as supposed by Pierre-Simon Laplace
