= Dunedin Symphony Orchestra =

Professional orchestra in Dunedin, New Zealand

- Orchestra
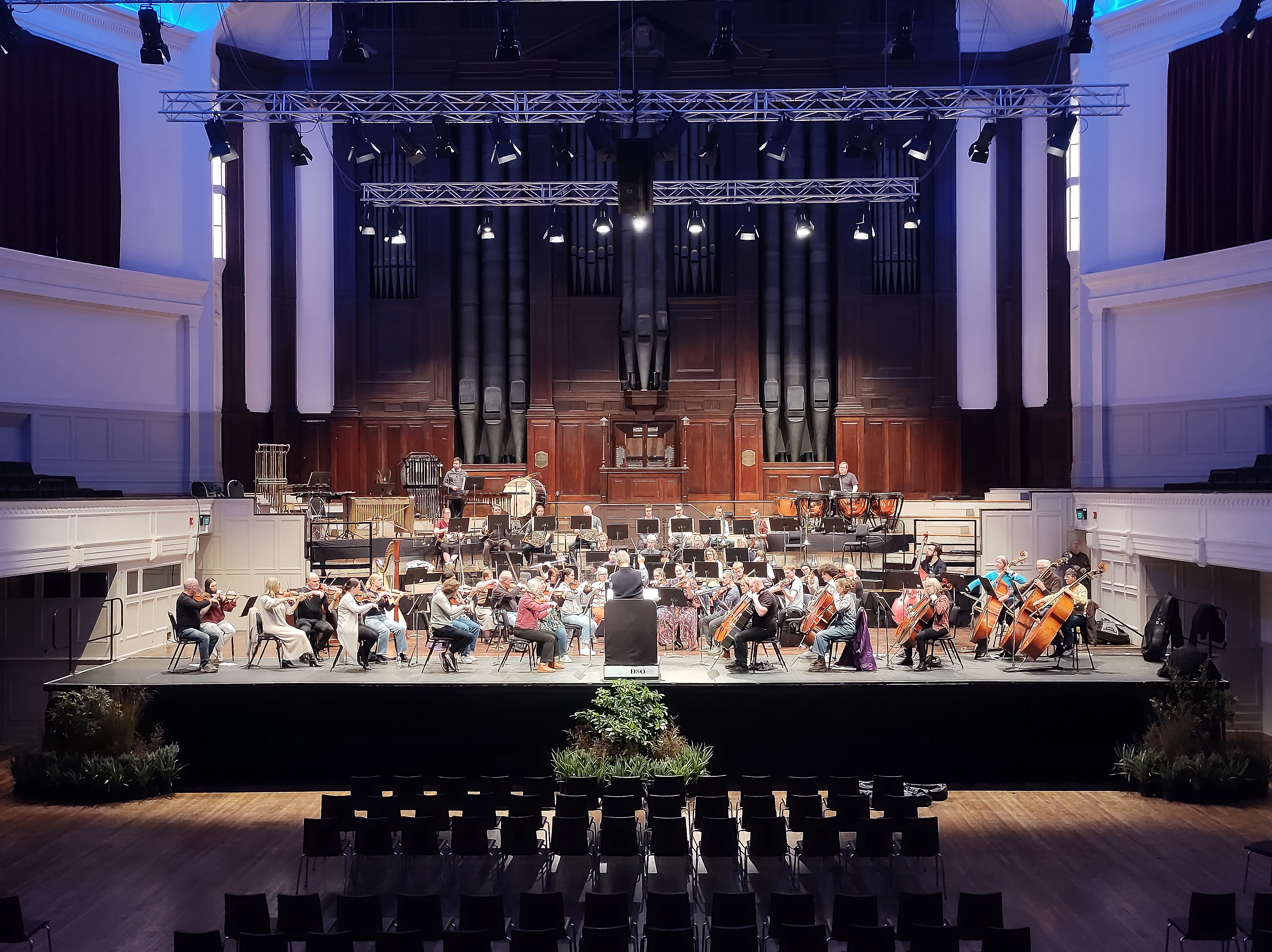
- DSO rehearsing in the Dunedin Town Hall, September 2023
- Short name: DSO
- Former name: Dunedin Civic Orchestra (1965–1983); Dunedin Sinfonia (1984–2001); Southern Sinfonia (2002–2015)
- Founded: 1965
- Location: Dunedin, New Zealand
- Concert hall: Dunedin Town Hall
- Website: www.dso.org.nz

Dunedin Symphony Orchestra is a professional symphony orchestra based in Dunedin, New Zealand. It hosts an annual subscription series of concerts in the Dunedin Town Hall, performing repertoire from the Classical, Romantic and contemporary periods. It also regularly accompanies Dunedin stage performances by the Royal New Zealand Ballet, Opera Otago and City Choir Dunedin.

In 2022 the orchestra's concert programme was conducted by Australian cellist and conductor Umberto Clerici, New Zealand Symphony Orchestra emeritus conductor James Judd, and New Zealand conductors Brent Stewart, Marc Taddei and Kenneth Young.

== History ==
Orchestral tradition in Dunedin emerged from the needs of amateur choral societies and other musical groups in the late 19th century. The Dunedin Ladies Orchestra was formed in 1882, and its first successful concert was given in December of that year at the Lyceum Hall. The Dunedin Orchestral Society, another amateur group, was formed and gave its first concert in 1888. The following year Italian violinist and conductor Raffaello Squarise settled in Dunedin and founded the Otago Conservatory of Music and the Dunedin Philharmonic Society, an amateur orchestra that he conducted until 1933.

In the late 1920s the New Zealand Radio Broadcast Company established orchestras in Auckland, Wellington, Christchurch and Dunedin for its regional radio stations. The Dunedin-based 4YA Orchestra recorded variety programmes for the region's 4YA radio station, as well as performing in public and accompanying local choral societies.

The first orchestra with the name "Dunedin Symphony Orchestra" was established in June 1932 and conducted by violinist B. L. H. de Rose. The orchestra went on to give several well-reviewed concerts that year, including a Christmas charity concert and a performance in Invercargill. By 1958 the orchestra had become a professional regional orchestra, with musicologist Peter Platt as its principal conductor.

The current orchestra organisation was formally established in 1965 by Platt and local musician Walter Sinton as the Dunedin Civic Orchestra, with funding assistance from the Dunedin City Council, University of Otago, the New Zealand Broadcasting Corporation and the New Zealand Queen Elizabeth II Arts Council.

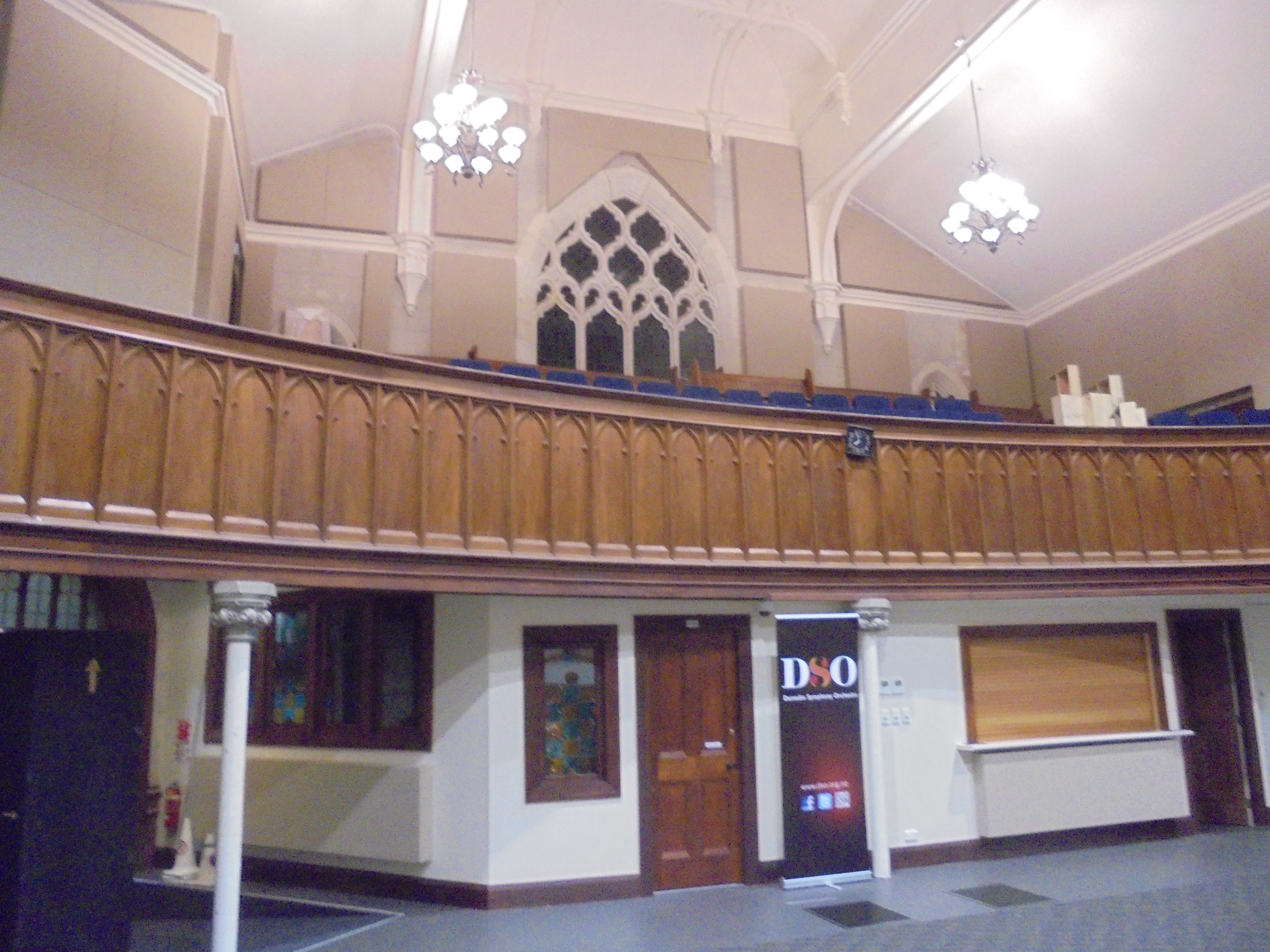
Hanover Hall (formerly Hanover Street Baptist Church) interior, 2018

The orchestra changed its name in 1983 to The Dunedin Sinfonia after a funding review and recommendations from the Queen Elizabeth II Arts Council, and a reduction in the number of players. In 2002 the orchestra changed its name to "Southern Sinfonia" to reflect its more regional scope, performing in Invercargill, Oamaru and Wānaka; however this touring funding was short-lived. The orchestra recovered in size over the following years to 70 players, and as part of the orchestra's 50th anniversary in 2016 it changed its name to the Dunedin Symphony Orchestra.

In 2018 the orchestra moved into its first permanent home, the community arts centre and historic former church building now known as Hanover Hall. After the financial uncertainty and disruption to rehearsals and performances brought about by the COVID-19 pandemic, in November 2021 the orchestra received a multi-year grant from the Otago Community Trust, and launched a donations appeal.
