= Hanover Street Baptist Church =

Historic building in Dunedin, New Zealand

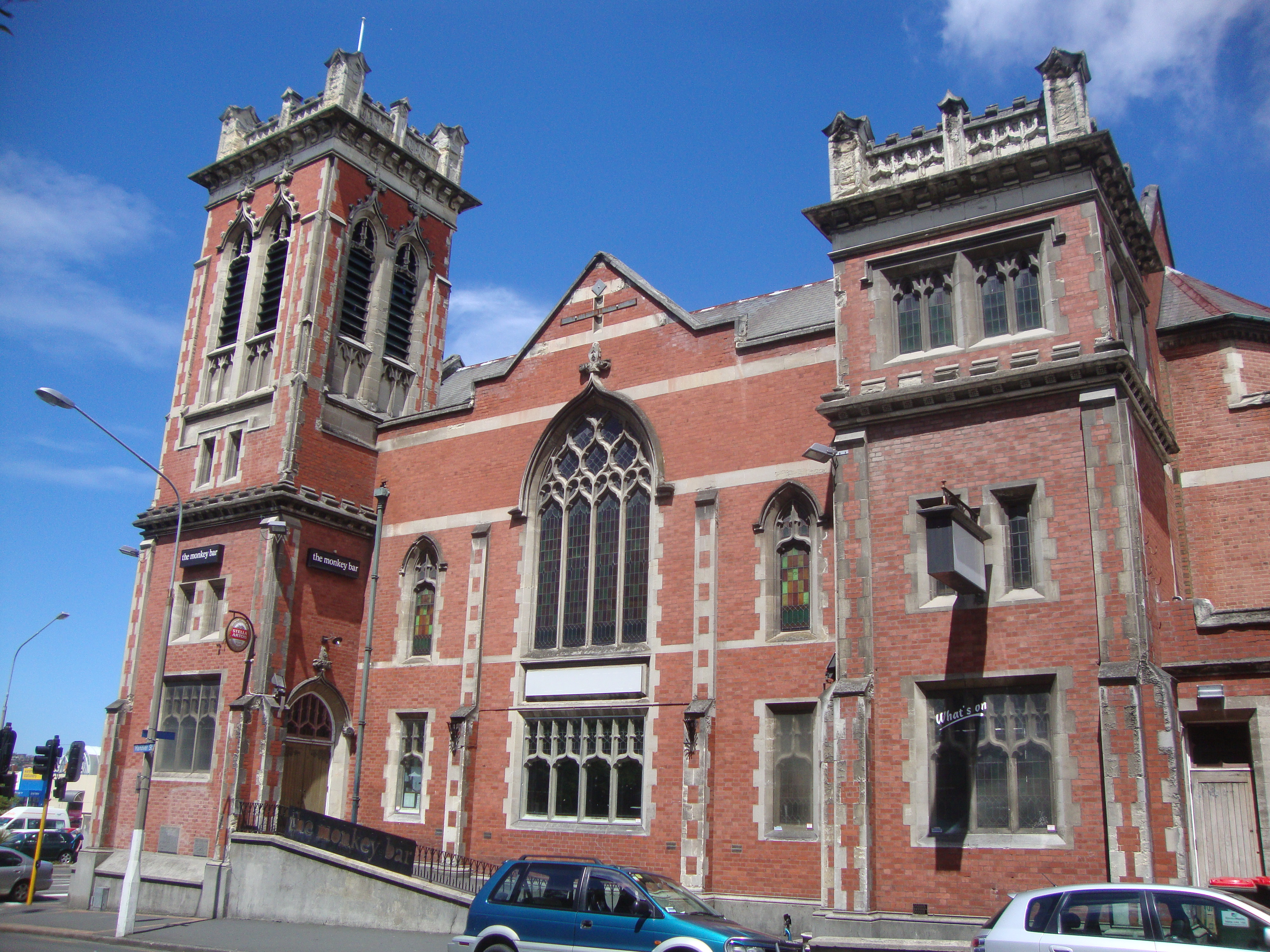
- The former Hanover Street Baptist Church in central Dunedin
- Former names: Hanover Street Baptist Church, The Mission, The Vatican, The Monkey Bar

General information
- Type: Church, concert hall
- Location: 65 Hanover Street, central Dunedin, New Zealand
- Coordinates: 45°52′13″S 170°30′26″E
- Current tenants: Dunedin Symphony Orchestra
- Completed: 1912
- Owner: Lloyd Williams

Design and construction
- Architect: Edmund Anscombe (1874–1948)

Heritage New Zealand – Category 1
- Designated: 8 August 1991
- Reference no.: 7492

The Hanover Street Baptist Church is a historic former Baptist church in Dunedin, New Zealand. Since 2018 it has housed the Dunedin Symphony Orchestra under the name Hanover Hall. The church was constructed in 1912 for the Dunedin Baptist congregation. By 1996 the congregation had vacated the premise. In 2016 it was purchased for the Dunedin Symphony Orchestra and underwent renovations before re-opening in 2018.

== History ==
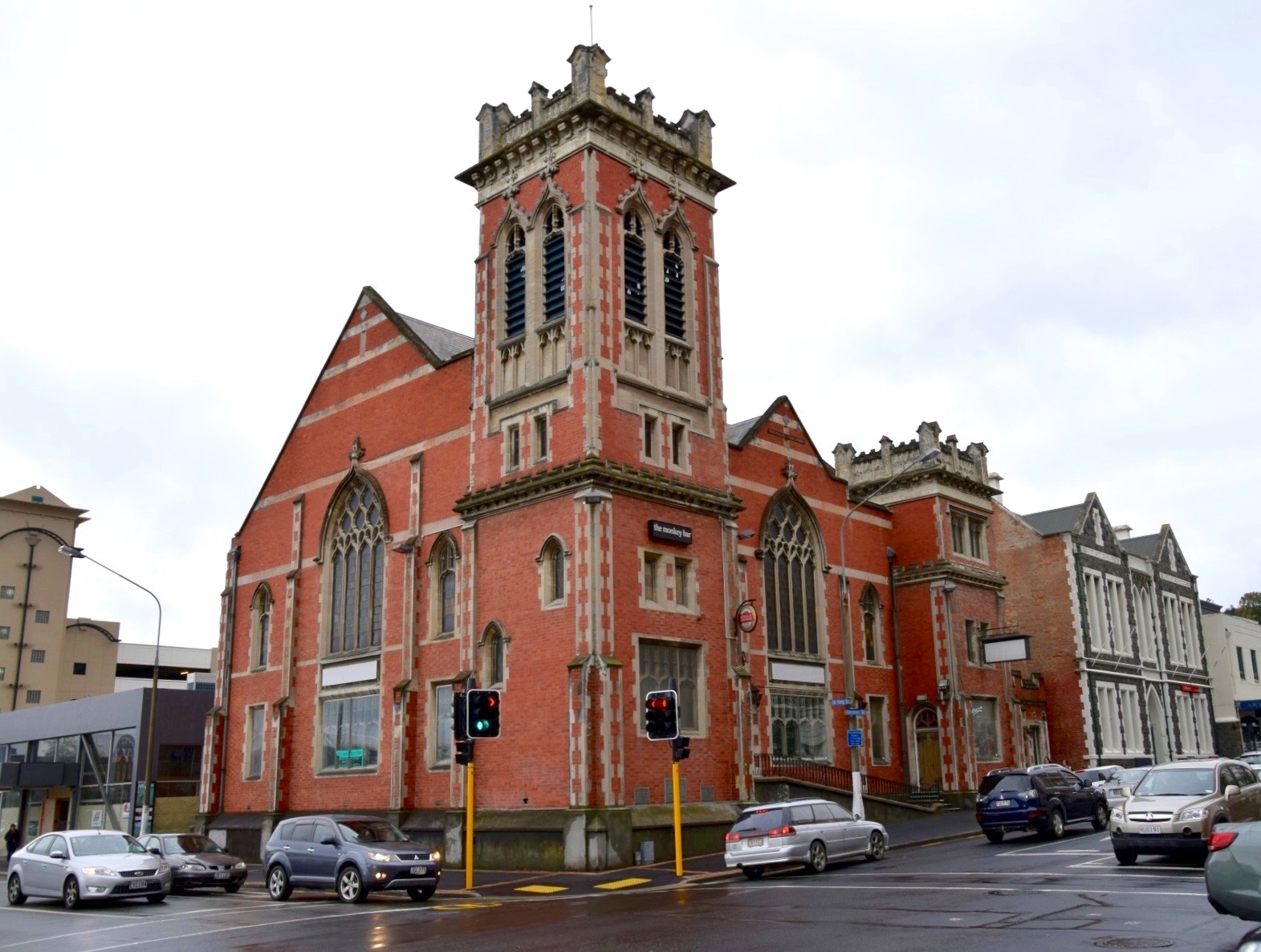
Viewed from the east in 2016

Initially Dunedin Baptists worshipped with other Free Church groups until they established themselves in a building of their own. The church and its Sunday school were founded in 1863. A Superintendent of Otago Thomas Dick (1823–1900) was one of the initial trustees. Dr William Purdie, an Edinburgh graduate and an early and distinguished medical practitioner in Dunedin, was a founding father.

The building was designed by Edmund Anscombe (1874–1948) and completed in 1912 as a replacement building for the original timber churchwhich was the first Baptist church in Dunedin.

A number of notable politicians and other well-known New Zealanders have been connected with the church including Dame Silvia Cartwright, a former Governor-General of New Zealand, who spent most of her younger years in Dunedin.

The congregation moved to another site in 1996. The building was unoccupied for a time before being used for a series of restaurants and bars, most latterly a nightclub called The Monkey Bar. In 2016 it was closed and purchased by a local couple for the purpose of housing the Dunedin Symphony Orchestra, and was officially reopened and renamed "Hanover Hall" in November 2018 by the Prime Minister of New Zealand, Jacinda Ardern.

== Features ==
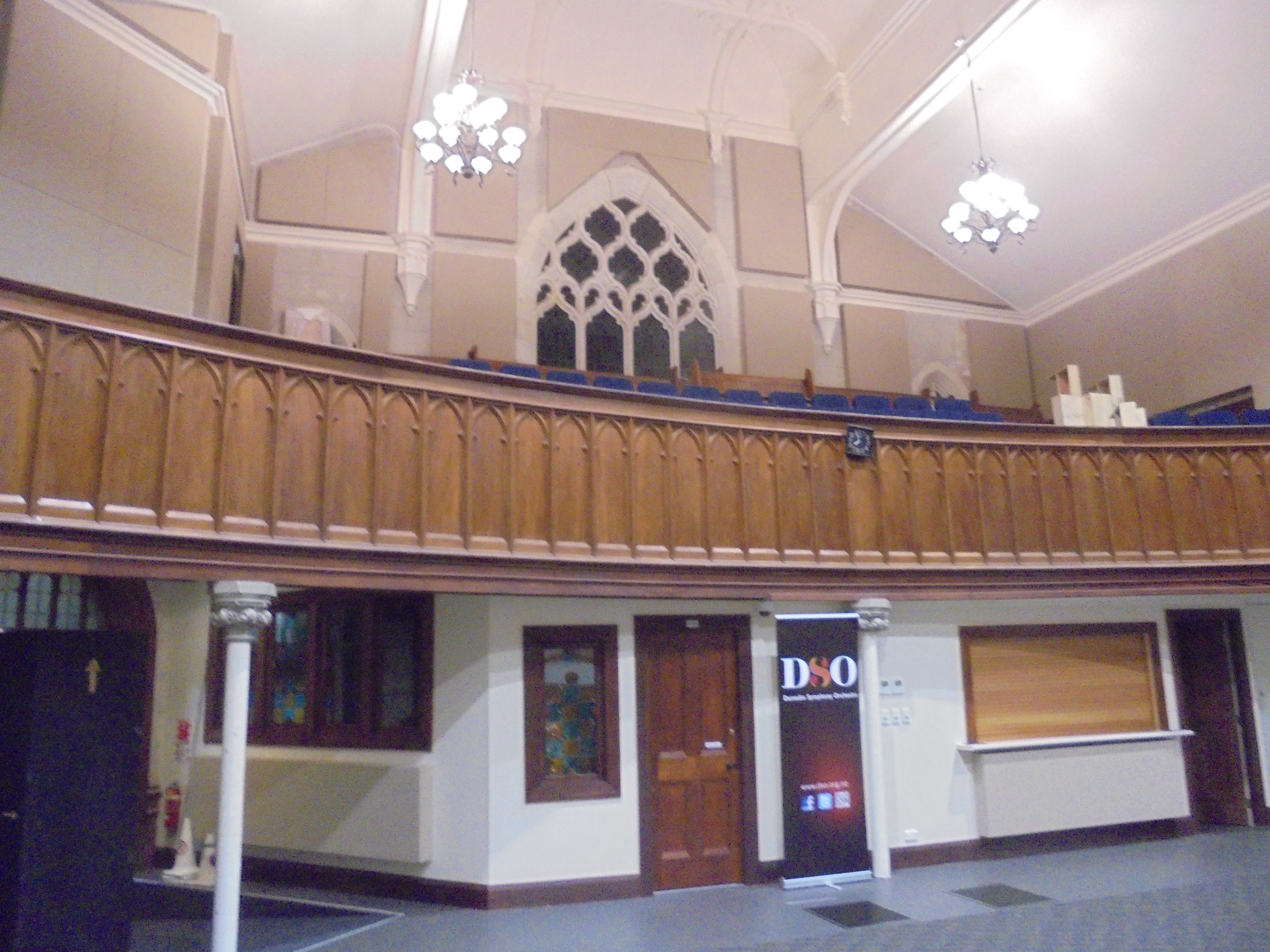
Hanover Hall (formerly Hanover Street Baptist Church) interior, 2018

The structure is a fine design and was provided with good stained glass windows, some of which were removed when it was converted from a church to a bar. The present floor is apparently built some three feet above the original. While the overhead balcony pews appear to be intact they do not seem to be in good condition.

One of the most interesting features is a pipe organ, which is believed to be only the second of its kind in New Zealand. (The other is at the Dunedin Town Hall.) The instrument has not been serviced for some time and it is uncertain whether it is in working condition. There is a bell tower, a prominent feature of the locality.

The building has been classified a Category I historic place by Heritage New Zealand, with registration number 4792.
