= Royal Dunedin Male Choir =

Male choir in New Zealand

The Royal Dunedin Male Choir is one of New Zealand's oldest male choirs. Their repertoire includes popular tunes, hymns, operatic choruses, folk songs and traditional melodies. The Choir undertakes fee-paying and charity engagements throughout the Otago, Southland and South Canterbury regions of New Zealand.

Royal Dunedin Male Choir

== History ==
The Choir's origins can be traced back to 1878 and the entertainment provided at functions marking the opening of the northern railway link into Dunedin. From this evolved a Liedertaefel Quartet which, in response to public demand, was to become the Dunedin Liedertaefel Society which was incorporated on 1 May 1886. Its aims were stated as "the practice and performance of music for male voices, and for the cultivation of a refined taste in that class of music". Its founder was Mr. S. Moyle.

In 1915 the name was changed to the Dunedin Male Choir, with the word "Royal" being added by royal patent in 1927, acknowledging three performances before royalty in 1901, 1920, and 1927.

The Royal Dunedin Male Choir from time to time combined with the Dunedin Choral Society (City of Dunedin Choir) in performances.

Audiences have included these notable persons:

- The Duke and Duchess of Cornwall and York (later King George V and Queen Mary)
- The Prince of Wales (later King Edward VIII)
- The Duke of York (later King George VI)
- Duke of Gloucester
- Queen Elizabeth II
- The Duke of Edinburgh
- Prince Charles (later the Prince of Wales)
- Princess Anne (later The Princess Royal)
- Duke and Duchess of Kent
- Various Governors-General of New Zealand
- Lord Jellicoe
- Lord Cobham
- Sir Paul Reeves
- Lord Provost of Edinburgh

== Administration ==
The Royal Dunedin Male Choir is administered by the Royal Dunedin Male Choir Incorporated, limited to and exclusively for charitable purposes, in New Zealand. The activities of the Choir are administered by a Committee, elected at the Annual General Meeting.

== Patronage ==
The Choir's constitution stipulates the Mayor of Dunedin is their patron.

== The Musical Directors (Conductors) ==
The Royal Dunedin Male Choir has been led and inspired by many musical directors and conductors.

Beginning with the choir's founder Samuel Moyle in 1886, he was followed by: Benno Scherek, Arthur Barth, Raphael Squarise, Jesse Timson (25 years), Dr Victor Galway (17 years), Alfred Walmsley, William Francis, Ernest Drake, Charles Collins, Gilmore McConnell, Donald Munro, James Clark, Val Drew (a record 26 years), Harry Madden, Les Bonar, Richard Madden (son of Harry Madden) who took up the position in 2001. Richard retired at the end of 2019. From 2020 the choir had been conducted by John Buchanan (MNZM).

== Accompanists ==
The choir has been well served by 27 pianists since 1886 and, coming forward in time, have included: Edward Taylor, Chas Martin, Colin Oliver, Iain Kerr, Judy Faris (née Galloway) with a record 27 years service, and from 1994 to the present, Linda Folland (née Kydd).

== Membership ==
Membership of the Royal Dunedin Male Choir is open to male singers from all walks of life who share a common delight in choral singing.

The choir comprises four sectional groups; First Tenors, Second Tenors (or Leads), First Basses (or Baritones) and Second Basses. Following a successful audition the musical director will assigns a singer to one of these sections based on his assessment of the singer's vocal range.

== Repertoire ==
The choir sings an array of different music styles and genres. This has included traditional hymns such as "The 23rd Psalm", Spirituals the likes of "I'm Gwine to Sing" and "Kentucky Babe", and songs from the popular operatic musicals like Phantom of the Opera, Porgy and Bess, Oklahoma, and My Fair Lady.

The choir also performs songs such as "Gwahoddiad", "American Trilogy" and "And the Glory of the Lord" (from Handel's Messiah).

The choir stages two concerts in the Dunedin Town Hall each year: one around mid-year (June) and a Christmas Concert in early December.
