= Harry Mandeno =

New Zealand architect

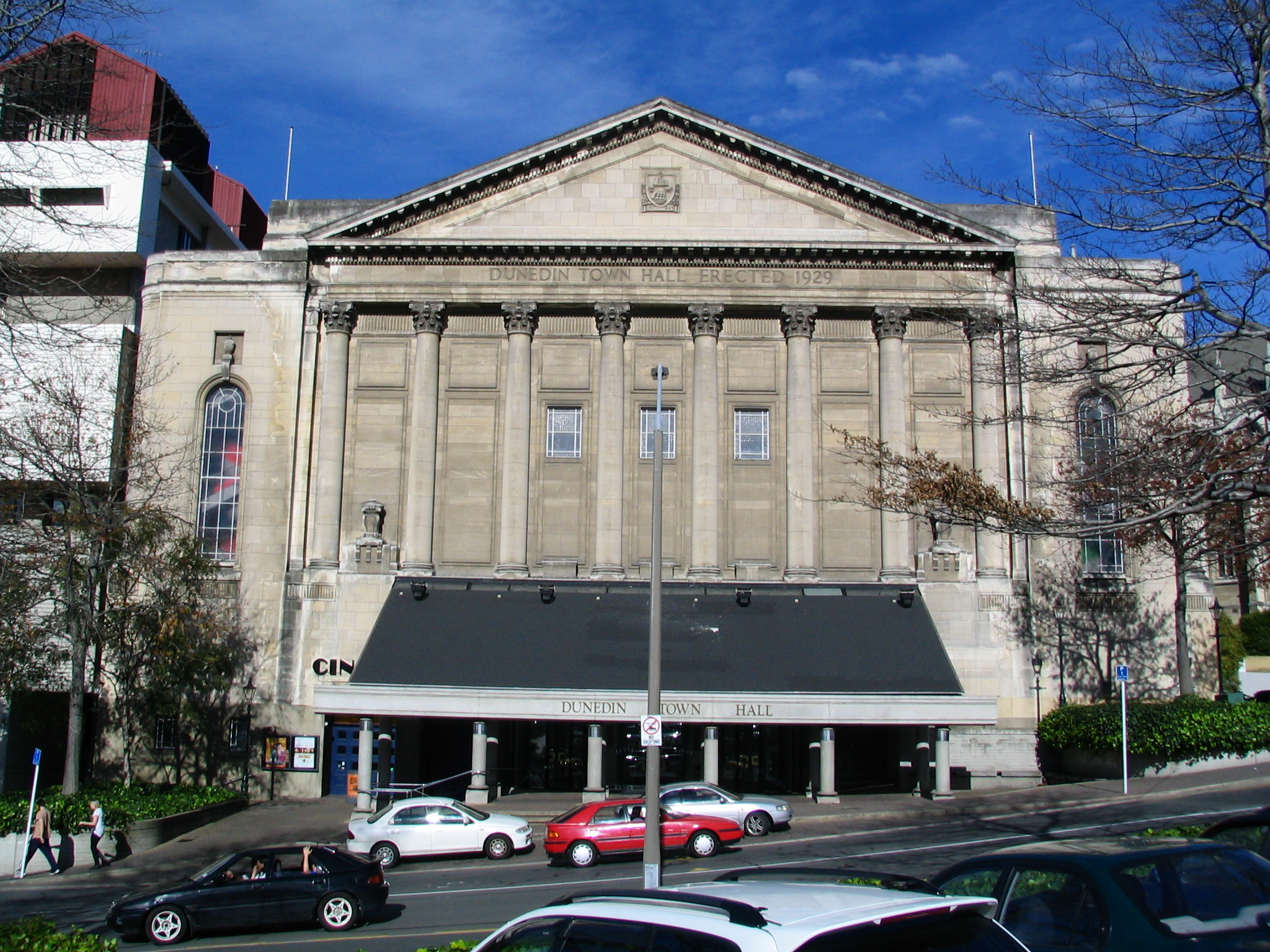
Dunedin Town Hall

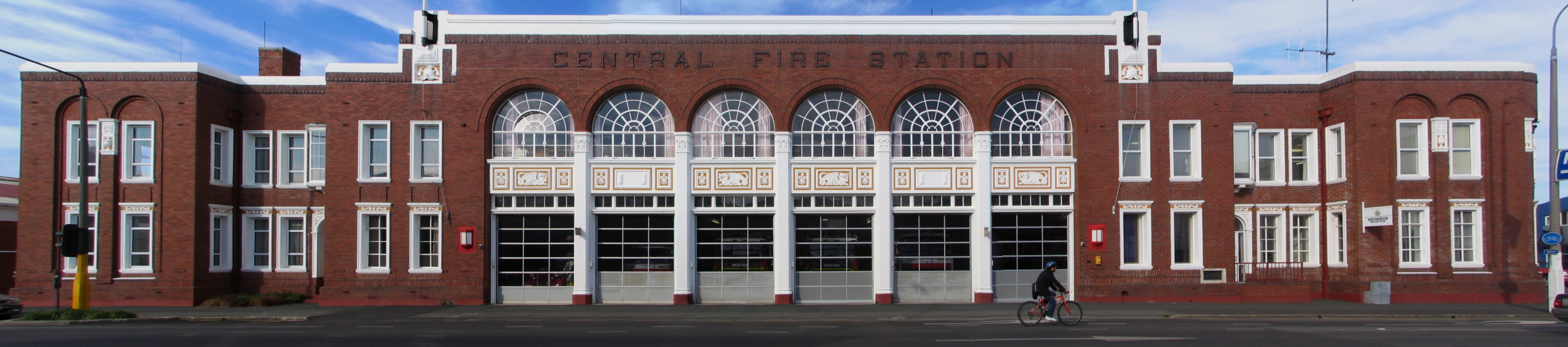
Dunedin Central Fire Station

Henry Thomas Mandeno (20 June 1879 – 20 August 1973) was a New Zealand modernist architect.

== Early life ==
Mandeno was born in 1879 at Te Awamutu to John Howe Mandeno and Margaret Caroline (née Leighton), and was educated at St John's College in Auckland. After graduating, he moved to Dunedin to live with his sister.

== Professional career ==
Mandeno first worked for builder Robert Crawford, while studying architectural draughtsmanship in night classes. Mandeno worked as an assistant at the architectural firm Mason & Wales, before setting up his own practice, with offices in the New Zealand Express Company building, in 1911.

Mandeno's first major commission was the King Edward Technical College (which now has Category I heritage listing), for which he needed to take on an assistant, Roy Fraser. Mandeno entered into partnership with Roy Fraser in 1921. Mandeno and Fraser, later Mandeno, Fraser and Galbraith, were one of the most prominent architectural firms in Dunedin. In 1913 they won the contract to build the Dunedin Town Hall concert hall and auditorium. They later designed numerous private residences and were noted for their "carefully detailed buildings". They designed the entrance to St James Theatre, and many of the fire stations in Dunedin.

Mandeno became a member of the New Zealand Institute of Architects at its incorporation in 1913, and was elected president in 1931.

== Private life ==
Mandeno married Alice Emily Coull in 1908. He died in 1973 and is buried with his wife in the Anderson's Bay Cemetery in Dunedin.
