= King Edward Technical College =

Former school in Dunedin, New Zealand

Coordinates: 45.87303°S 170.49885°E

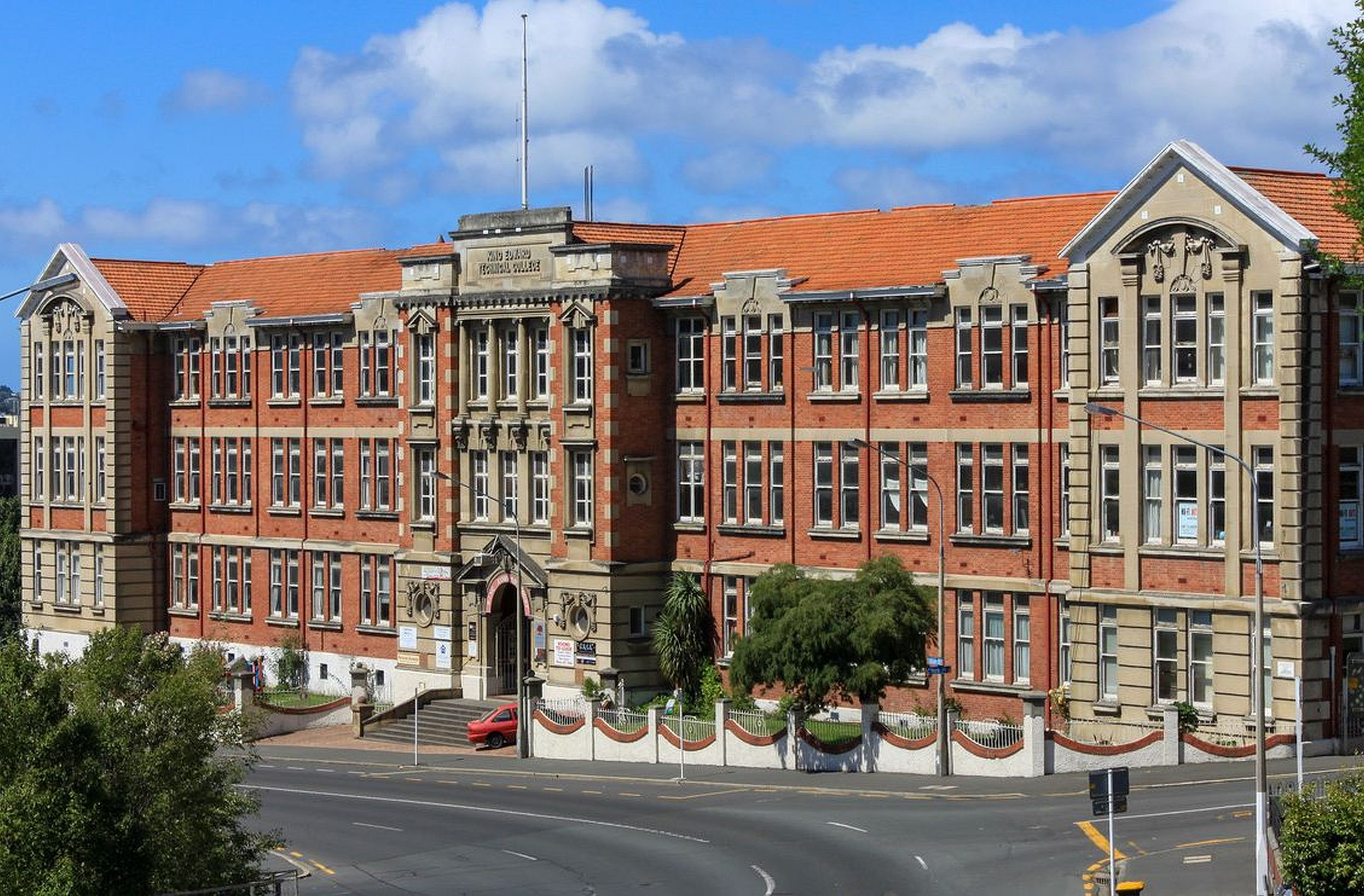
- King Edward Court

General information
- Type: College
- Location: 291 Stuart Street, Dunedin
- Construction started: 20 March 1913
- Completed: 1914

Design and construction
- Architect: Harry Mandeno

Heritage New Zealand – Category 1
- Designated: 7 July 1987
- Reference no.: 4712

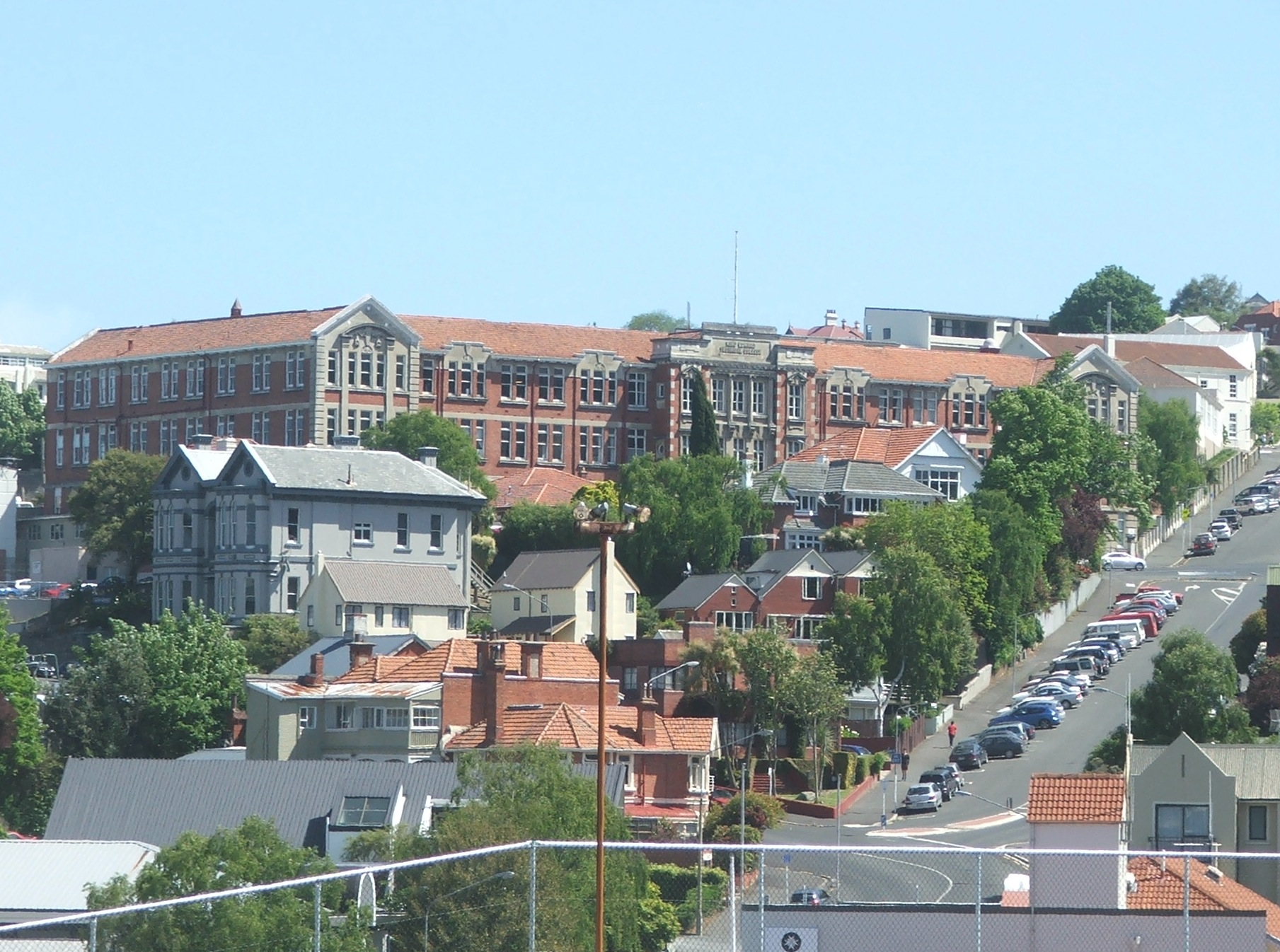
The college building is visible from much of central Dunedin.

King Edward Technical College is a former technical college in Dunedin, New Zealand. The college was established in 1889 as the Dunedin Technical School when the Caledonian Society of Otago instigated night education classes.

By 1955 the college was the largest secondary school in the country, this was short lived as the institution's tertiary and secondary arms were split into Otago Polytechnic in 1966 and King Edward High School—later Logan Park High School in 1974.

The college's former buildings, including the main block now known as King Edward Court, are registered as category 1 with Heritage New Zealand. King Edward Court was sold into private ownership and since then has provided commercial rental spaces.

== History ==
In 1888 the Dunedin Technical Classes Association was formed with the intent of providing technical education to older pupils through night classes. The first classes—in carpentry, chemistry, cookery, domestic economy, typewriting and woodcarving—were held at the "Dunedin Technical School" on 1 May 1889 in a building on Moray Place. This proved popular and was brought under the remit of the state. Continued interest resulted in high enrolments which led to the decision to build the college building.

In 1910 a new structure in Upper Stuart Street was planned. Harry Mandeno designed the building. The foundation stone was laid 20 March 1913 and it was completed in 1914. It was at this point that the school changed its name to honour the late King Edward VII. In 1921 control of the Dunedin School of Art was transferred to the Technical School's Board. The college's first principal was Angus Marshall.

In 1955 it was the largest secondary school in the country with 2,500 pupils.

In the 1960s the school was split into Otago Polytechnic and King Edward High School. The two organisations left the site and the King Edward Technical College building, now known as King Edward Court, was sold into private ownership.

In February 1966, the tertiary arm of the college officially adopted the name Otago Polytechnic and moved, initially to a new site on York Place close to the Upper Stuart Street site, but later to Union Street, close to the University of Otago. Since 1975, the secondary component has been located on a new site close to the polytechnic and Logan Park, now renamed as Logan Park High School.

== Heritage buildings ==
=== King Edward Court ===
The prominent, old King Edward Technical College buildings on Stuart Street are now known as King Edward Court. The main building, designed by Harry Mandeno as his first commission, has a Category I listing with Heritage New Zealand, registration number 4712. King Edward Court is a three-storey imposing brick building. It is located on a prominent road on that is elevated above the centre of Dunedin. This location combined with the size and detail of the building make it a landmark for the city. It has both Neo-Baroque and Georgian Revival design elements such as the oeil de boeuf windows and the brick façade.

King Edward Technical College has two wings and a hall: the Kempthorne Wing; Burt Hall, added in 1918 and named after Alexander Burt, chairman of the Dunedin Technical Classes Association; Thomson Wing, added in 1924 and named after George Thomson, first superintendent of the school. The building has over 75 rooms which are rented out to commercial tenants.

In 2022 the property was sold to a developer with plans to convert the building for residential tenants.

=== Old Dunedin School of Art building ===
The old Dunedin School of Art building is located near King Edward Court at the corner of Tennyson Street and York Place. It is part of the same heritage registration for the King Edward Technical College buildings. It opened in 1937 and was designed by John Mair. The school is considered by some as where New Zealand modernism first originated from.

The building is now part of Trinity Catholic College as the school's Pompallier Arts Block.

== Notable academics and staff ==
- Vernon Griffiths

== Notable alumni ==
=== The Arts ===
Alumni of the Otago School of Art and Design, now the Dunedin School of Art, now part of Otago Polytechnic.

- Len Castle
- Anne Hamblett
- Ralph Hotere
- Doris Lusk
- Colin McCahon
- Toss Woollaston
- Patrick Hayman

Several of the arts alumni of King Edward Technical College became leading members of The Group, an important New Zealand arts movement of the 1920s to 1970s.

=== Sport ===
- John Hore – All Black
- Keith Murdoch – All Black
- Joe Procter – All Black
- Charlie Sonntag – All Black

=== Science ===
- Joseph William Mellor

== See also ==
- Dunedin Technical – Association football team formed by alumni of the institution, originally known as King Edward Technical College Old Boys
