= Charlie Sonntag =

New Zealand rugby union player

- Born: William Theodore Charles Sonntag; 3 June 1894 Dunedin, New Zealand
- Died: 30 June 1988 (aged 94) Dunedin, New Zealand
- School: King Edward Technical College

Rugby union career
- Position: Lock
Amateur team(s)
Years	Team	Apps	(Points)
- Kaikorai
Provincial / State sides
Years	Team	Apps	(Points)
1915–1930	Otago	60	
International career
Years	Team	Apps	(Points)
1929	New Zealand	3	

William Theodore Charles Sonntag was an All Blacks rugby union player from Dunedin, New Zealand. He was a Lock.

He played eight matches including three tests for the All Blacks when they toured Australia in 1929, and had been selected for the team on his 35th birthday. He was the tenth oldest All Black; see player records

He was born in Dunedin, and educated at King Edward Technical College. He played 60 times for Otago in a sixteen year career. He served as a Lance-Corporal with the Wellington Mounted Rifles Regiment during World War I and served in New Zealand only during World War II. He was president and a life member of the Kaikorai Club. His uncle T. Sonntag played for Otago and the South Island.

He died in Dunedin on 30 June 1988, aged 94.
