= John Hore (rugby union) =

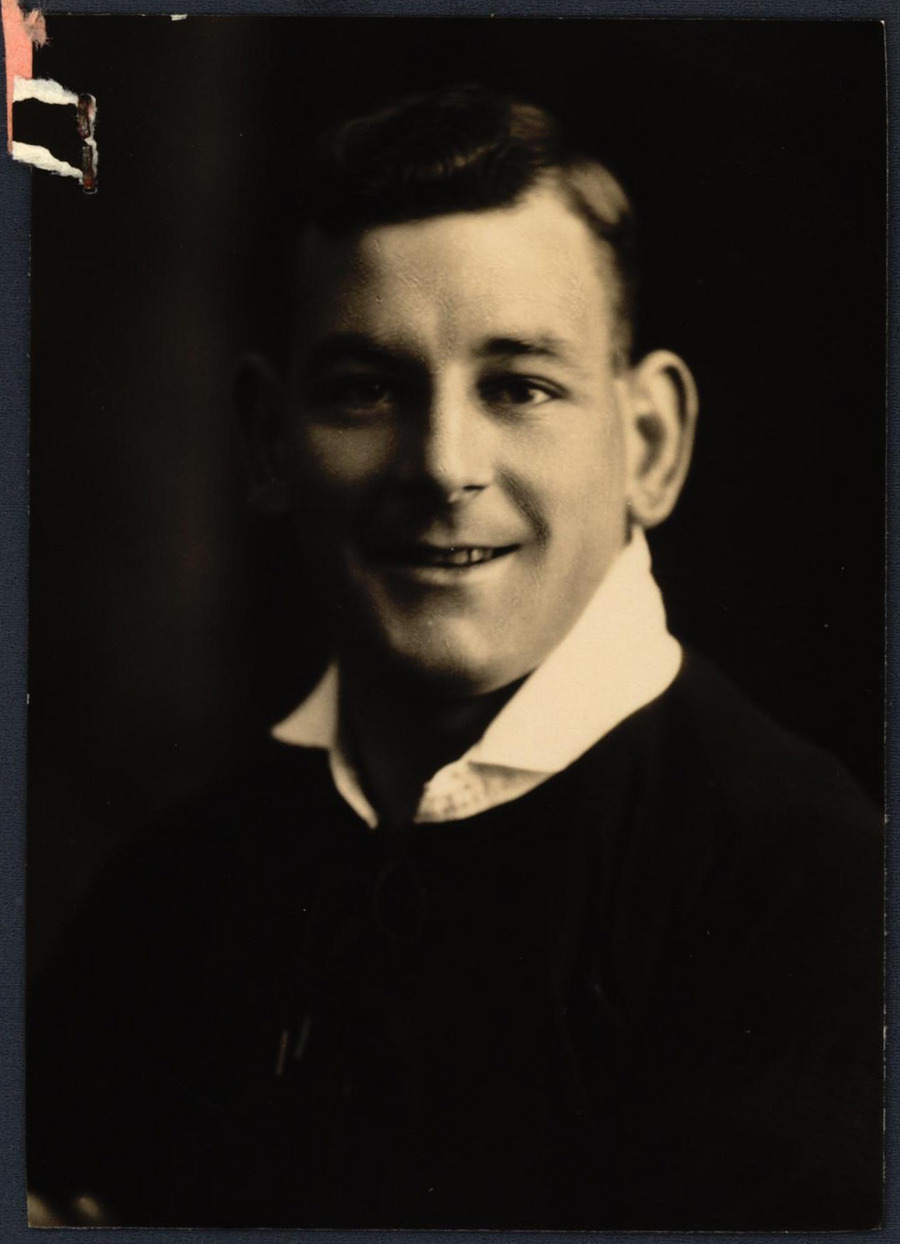
- Hore in 1935
- Born: 9 August 1907 Dunedin, New Zealand
- Died: 7 July 1979 (aged 71) Dunedin, New Zealand
- Height: 1.77 m (5 ft 10 in)
- Weight: 82 kg (181 lb)
- School: King Edward Technical College
- Occupation: Butcher

Rugby union career
- Position(s): Hooker; Prop
Provincial / State sides
Years	Team	Apps	(Points)
1926–36	Otago		
International career
Years	Team	Apps	(Points)
1928–36	New Zealand	10	(9)

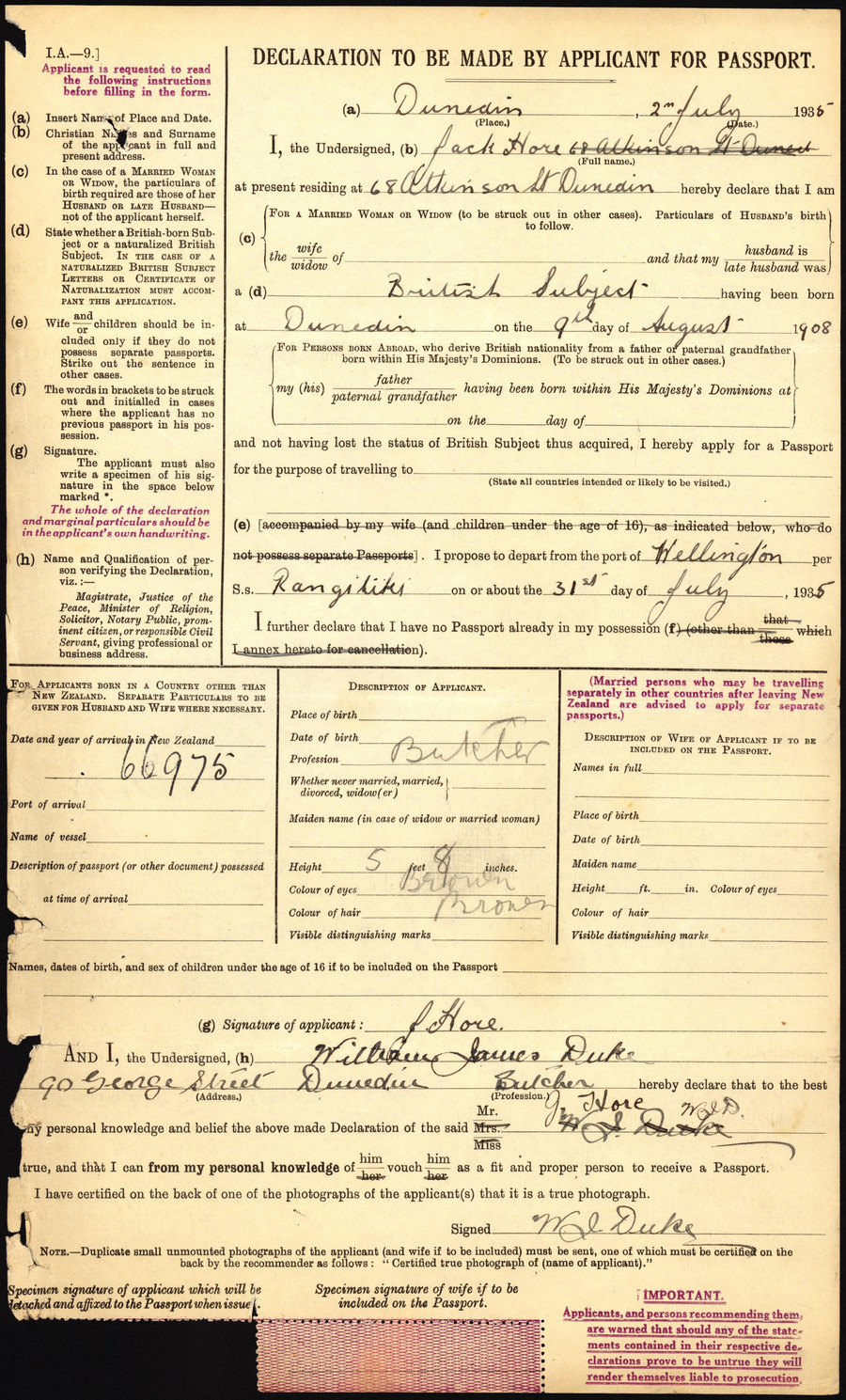
John Jack Hore passport application (1935)

John Hore (9 August 1907 – 7 July 1979) was a New Zealand rugby union player. A hooker and prop, Hore represented Otago at a provincial level, and was a member of the New Zealand national side, the All Blacks from 1928 to 1936. He played 45 matches for the All Blacks including 10 internationals. During World War II Hore served as a warrant officer with the 2nd New Zealand Expeditionary Force (NZEF) in the Middle East, and after the end of the war was a selector of the 2nd NZEF "Kiwis" army team that toured Britain.

He was selected by the editors of the 1935 Rugby Almanac of New Zealand as one of their 5 players of the year in 1934.

Hore died in Dunedin in 1979 and his ashes were buried in Andersons Bay Cemetery.
