= Joe Procter =

- Born: Albert Charles Procter; 22 May 1906 Dunedin, New Zealand
- Died: 11 October 1989 (aged 83) Mosgiel, New Zealand
- Height: 1.78 m (5 ft 10 in)
- Weight: 78 kg (172 lb)
- School: King Edward Technical College

Rugby union career
- Position: Wing
Provincial / State sides
Years	Team	Apps	(Points)
1930–35	Otago	24	
International career
Years	Team	Apps	(Points)
1932	New Zealand	1	(0)

Albert Charles "Joe" Procter (22 May 1906 – 11 October 1989) was a New Zealand rugby union player. A wing three-quarter, Procter represented Otago at a provincial level, and was a member of the New Zealand national side, the All Blacks, in 1932. He played four matches for the All Blacks including one international against Australia.
