= City Choir Dunedin =

Choir in Dunedin, New Zealand

- Choir
- City Choir Dunedin logo
- Also known as: Dunedin Choral Society Incorporated
- Former name: Dunedin Choral Society (1863–1966); Schola Cantorum (1967–1992); City of Dunedin Choir (1993–2011)
- Founded: October 1863
- Music director: David Burchell
- Headquarters: Dunedin, New Zealand
- Rehearsal space: Mornington Presbyterian Church
- Affiliation: New Zealand Choral Federation
- Associated groups: Dunedin Symphony Orchestra
- Website: www.citychoirdunedin.org.nz

City Choir Dunedin (trading name of Dunedin Choral Society; formerly City of Dunedin Choir, Schola Cantorum) is an auditioned mixed-voice choir in Dunedin, New Zealand. It accepts singers of all age groups from the wider Dunedin community and performs large-scale classical choral works. The choir's membership grew from an initial 45 to around 120 as of 2012. The Choir is a member of the New Zealand Choral Federation (NZCF), which was formed in 1985 to promote high quality choral singing in New Zealand.

== Repertoire ==
The choir's repertoire encompasses Baroque, Classical and Romantic symphonic choral works, and includes contemporary New Zealand choral music. The choir is usually involved in four or five concerts a year and regularly performs with the Dunedin Symphony Orchestra. Occasionally the choir performs with other orchestras such as the Dunedin Youth Orchestra, the Saint Kilda Brass Band and the New Zealand Symphony Orchestra, as well as with other choirs like the Christchurch City Choir, Voices New Zealand Chamber Choir, Auckland Choral Society, the Southern Youth Choir, Invercargill A Capella Singers and the Southern Children's Choir.

== History ==
In October 1863 the Dunedin Philharmonic Society, conducted by W. Haydn Flood, was founded by George R. West. The Dunedin Choral Society, conducted by Charles J. Bates, was founded in the same week with its first practice being held on 28 October. The following year Flood was appointed the conductor of the Dunedin Choral Society, which collapsed after one concert, and West replaced Flood as conductor of the Dunedin Philharmonic Society into which the choir had been assimilated. For the 1864 Messiah performance the choir consisted of 45 voices.

With varying success the Dunedin Philharmonic Society carried on until 1867 and in 1868 the Private Musical Society was formed from, amongst others, the wreck of the Philharmonic Society. The Private Musical Society wound up in January 1871 and Dunedin Choral Society was re-launched by George West and Arthur Towsey. At this time first West and then Towsey were appointed conductors. In 1889 the Dunedin Choral Society drifted into recess while singers concentrated on participation in the Exhibition choir for the New Zealand and South Seas Exhibition (1889) held in Dunedin.

In 1897 the Dunedin Choral Society was re-established by G.M. Thomson and others, with James Coombs appointed as conductor. Due to artistic and financial difficulties the Dunedin Choral Society became inactive in 1913 and was wound up in May 1914, but in June 1914 Sydney Wolf established the new Dunedin Choral Society. The existence of the choir has since been continuous.

The Dunedin Choral Society continued to give performances during the First World War, and by 1939 Alfred Walmsley led a choir of 80 members, reduced from about 180 after auditions were held for the first time in 1937. The choir was then accompanied by the 4YA Orchestra, which was disbanded in 1959. The Dunedin Choral Society also occasionally combined with the Royal Dunedin Male Choir and the Returned Services Association Choir.

In 1961 the Dunedin Concert Orchestra was formed and accompanied the Dunedin Choral Society in a performance of the epic St Matthew Passion under the baton of conductor Peter Platt. The Dunedin Concert Orchestra became the Dunedin Civic Orchestra in 1966, a society that adopted the performance name Dunedin Sinfonia in 1985, Southern Sinfonia in 2001 and Dunedin Symphony Orchestra in 2016. Since its inception the Dunedin Civic Orchestra has been a regular performance partner to the Dunedin Choral Society.

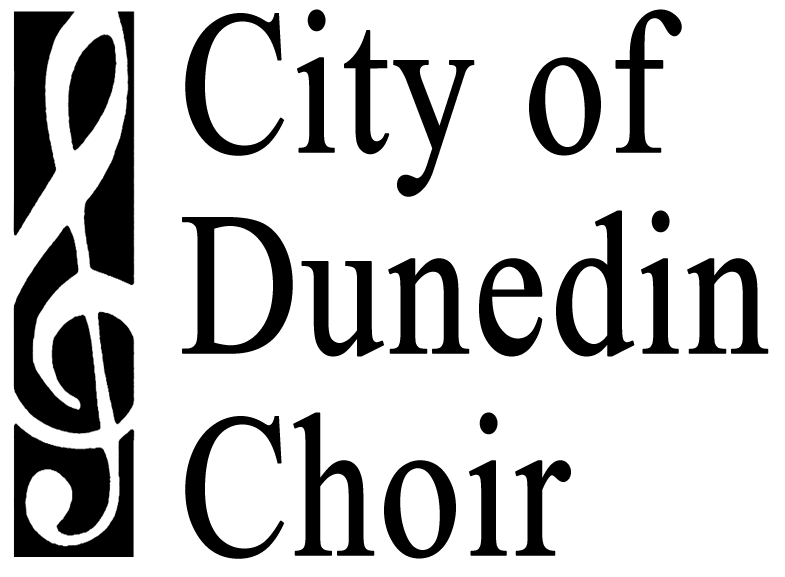
City of Dunedin Choir logo, prior to December 2012

The Dunedin Choral Society changed its name to Schola Cantorum in 1967, upon merging with the University Union Choir, and then to City of Dunedin Choir in 1993, the year it celebrated 130 years of existence. At the end of 2012 the choir's performing name was again changed, this time to City Choir Dunedin, in time for its 150th anniversary celebrations in 2013.

Notable conductors include Sidney Wolf (1914–1922), Victor Galway (1922–1925), Alfred Walmsley (1933–1943), Jack Speirs (1966–1973) and David Burchell (2000–present).

== Legal status ==
On 26 April 1915 the Dunedin Choral Society was registered as an incorporated society (Incorporation Number 227070) with the New Zealand Companies Office.

On 30 June 2008 the Dunedin Choral Society was registered as a charity (CC29845) with the New Zealand Charities Services.

== Bibliography ==
- Burchell, Jenny (2019). The Life and Times of a Choral Society: Dunedin’s City Choir 1863-2013. Dunedin: City Choir Dunedin. ISBN 978-0-473-46784-5. OCLC 1106001487. OL 33968833M. Wikidata Q115122151.
- Campbell, Margaret (1945), Music in Dunedin, Dunedin: Charles Begg & Co., OCLC 29089558, Wikidata Q115122348
- Thomson, John M. (1991). The Oxford History of New Zealand Music. Oxford: Oxford University Press. ISBN 0-19-558176-8. OCLC 26724223. OL 1618054M. Wikidata Q115122586.
