= Victor Galway =

New Zealand musician

Victor Edward Galway (24 May 1894 – 9 July 1960) was a New Zealand music academic, organist, conductor and composer.

== Biography ==
Victor Galway was born in Colchester, Essex, England in 1894. He studied organ under Frederick Ely. In 1911 he emigrated with his family to Australia, where he studied music at the University of Melbourne. He graduated with a Bachelor of Music degree in 1916, and in 1923 became the university's first student to complete the requirements for the Doctor of Music degree.

In 1919 Galway moved to Dunedin, New Zealand, to take up the position of organist and choirmaster at First Church of Otago. He became the first lecturer in music at the University of Otago in 1926, and the first Blair Professor of Music at the university in 1939 (so named after the benefactor John Blair). He became Dunedin City organist in 1930.

Through the university, Galway would give weekly public music classes, during which he would call on Honor McKellar to illustrate examples.

Galway also served as conductor of the Dunedin Choral Society, conductor of the Otago University Musical Society, and president of the Otago Society of Musicians. Most of his compositions were for choral music, and several of his pieces were published by Oxford University Press.

In 1935, he was awarded the King George V Silver Jubilee Medal, and in 1953, he was awarded the Queen Elizabeth II Coronation Medal.

Galway suffered a stroke in 1954 and shortly afterwards retired from the University of Otago. He died at Cherry Farm Hospital, near Dunedin, on 9 July 1960, survived by his daughter. His wife Janette, whom he married in 1917, predeceased him.

== Selected works ==
- "Who is Sylvia?" - choral work
- Six works in the Dominion Song Book No. 13 (1949)
- Magnificat in G
- Nunc Dimittis in G
- Two anthems: Let us now praise famous men and Grant, we beseech thee
