= Walter James Sinton =

New Zealand musical retailer (1911–1980)

Walter James Sinton (1911–1980) was a notable New Zealand butcher, musical retailing manager, percussionist, broadcaster and concert impresario. He was born in Dunedin, Otago, New Zealand in 1911.
