= Dunedin Town Hall =

Municipal building in Dunedin, New Zealand

Coordinates: 45.873343°S 170.503053°E

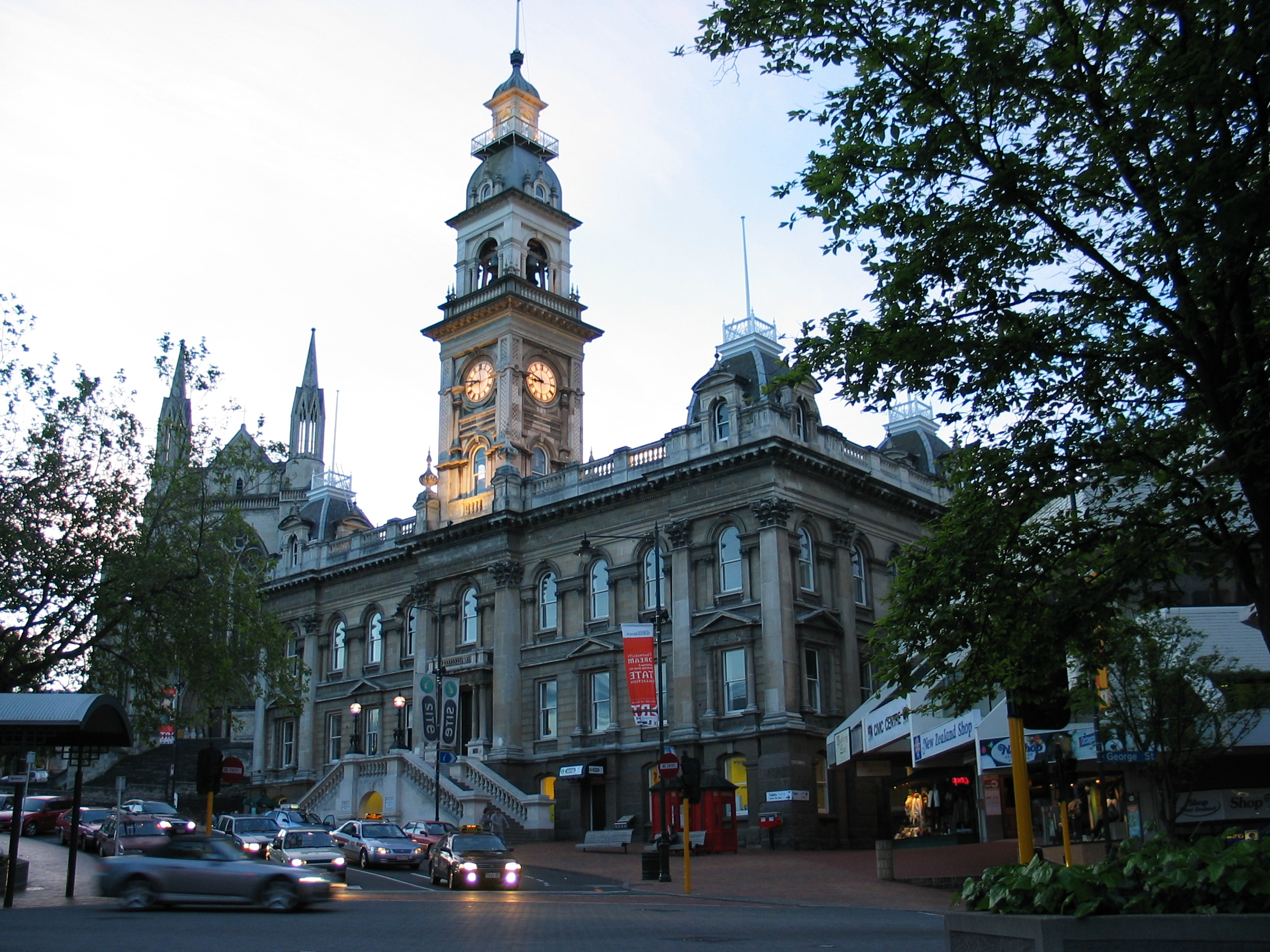
- The Octagon (south) facade
- Interactive map of the Dunedin Town Hall area
- Alternative names: Dunedin Centre; Dunedin Municipal Chambers

General information
- Architectural style: Neo-Renaissance (first phase); Neo-Baroque (second phase)
- Location: The Octagon, Dunedin, New Zealand
- Construction started: 23 May 1878 (first phase); 3 March 1928 (second phase)
- Completed: 25 May 1880 (first phase); 15 February 1930 (second phase)
- Renovated: 1989
- Cost: £20,000 (first phase) £86,000 (second phase)
- Owner: Dunedin City Council

Height
- Height: 47 m (154 ft)

Design and construction
- Architects: Robert Lawson (first phase); Henry Mandeno and Roy Fraser (second phase)

Renovating team
- Architects: Bill Hesson and Robert Tongue
- Awards: 1991 New Zealand Institute of Architects’ National Award

Other information
- Seating capacity: 2,200

Heritage New Zealand – Category 1
- Official name: Municipal Chambers
- Designated: 2 July 1987
- Reference no.: 2197

The Dunedin Town Hall, also known as the Dunedin Centre, is a municipal building in the city of Dunedin in New Zealand. It is located in the heart of the city extending from The Octagon, the central plaza, to Moray Place through a whole city block. It is the seat of the Dunedin City Council, providing its formal meeting chamber, as well as a large auditorium and a conference centre. The oldest part of the building has been called the only substantial Victorian town hall still in existence in New Zealand.

== Name ==
The name is ambiguous. The structure was built in two major stages with a fifty-year gap between. The first stage, built in the 19th century, is a block of offices. This was popularly called the "Dunedin Town Hall" even though it had no auditorium. The second stage, built in the early 20th century, had not one but two auditoriums; this whole new addition was then officially designated the "Dunedin Town Hall", and the pre-existing office block became the "Municipal Chambers". The term "Dunedin Town Hall" now came to be used in its official sense but also specifically for the main auditorium by itself and frequently too for the whole extended building. In the 1980s the official name for the second stage additions was changed to "The Dunedin Centre" but few people know exactly what that refers to. This article is about the whole building.

== Construction history ==
=== First phase ===
Dunedin City was incorporated in 1865, the first so constituted in New Zealand. Following the population growth and wealth generated by the Otago gold rush, the city council decided it should build new and larger premises. The settlement's first wooden town offices were demolished in 1859, and no formal structure existed after that, partly because of indecision as to where it should be. A decision was finally made in favour of the site of the city's first hospital. (This is commemorated by a plaque in Municipal Lane.) A design competition was held which was won in 1877 by Thomas Bedford Cameron, with a design submitted by R. A. Lawson placed second.

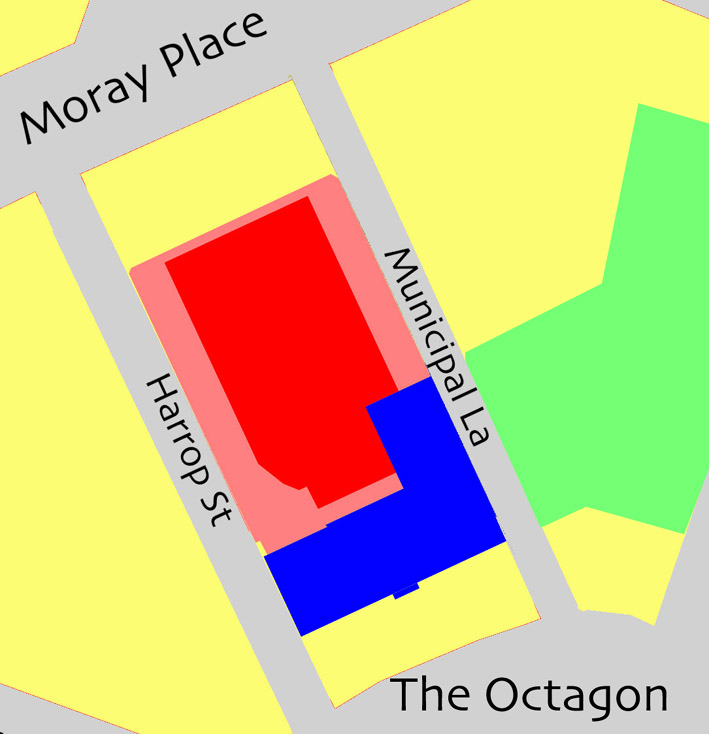
Plan showing the first (blue) and second (red) stages of construction. The concert hall is marked in deeper red. The area shown in green is the Dunedin Civic Centre.

When costed Cameron’s design proved to be more expensive than the £7,000 allowed for the project. The council, which had admired Lawson’s impressive front elevation, employed him to re-work Cameron’s design and also to supervise its construction. In the event he was allowed to substitute his own design for Cameron’s.

A contract was let to Mercer & Low for £15,230 – a considerable increase on the original budget. The foundation stone was laid on 23 May 1878 and the building was opened for business on 25 May 1880. By the time a clock had been installed the whole price was £20,000.

The structure was conceived as the first part of a larger complex which would eventually include an auditorium to seat 2,000 people. What was built in this first stage was a set of offices on the Octagon, with a council chamber and an observation tower, the latter intended as a lookout for the Fire Brigade.

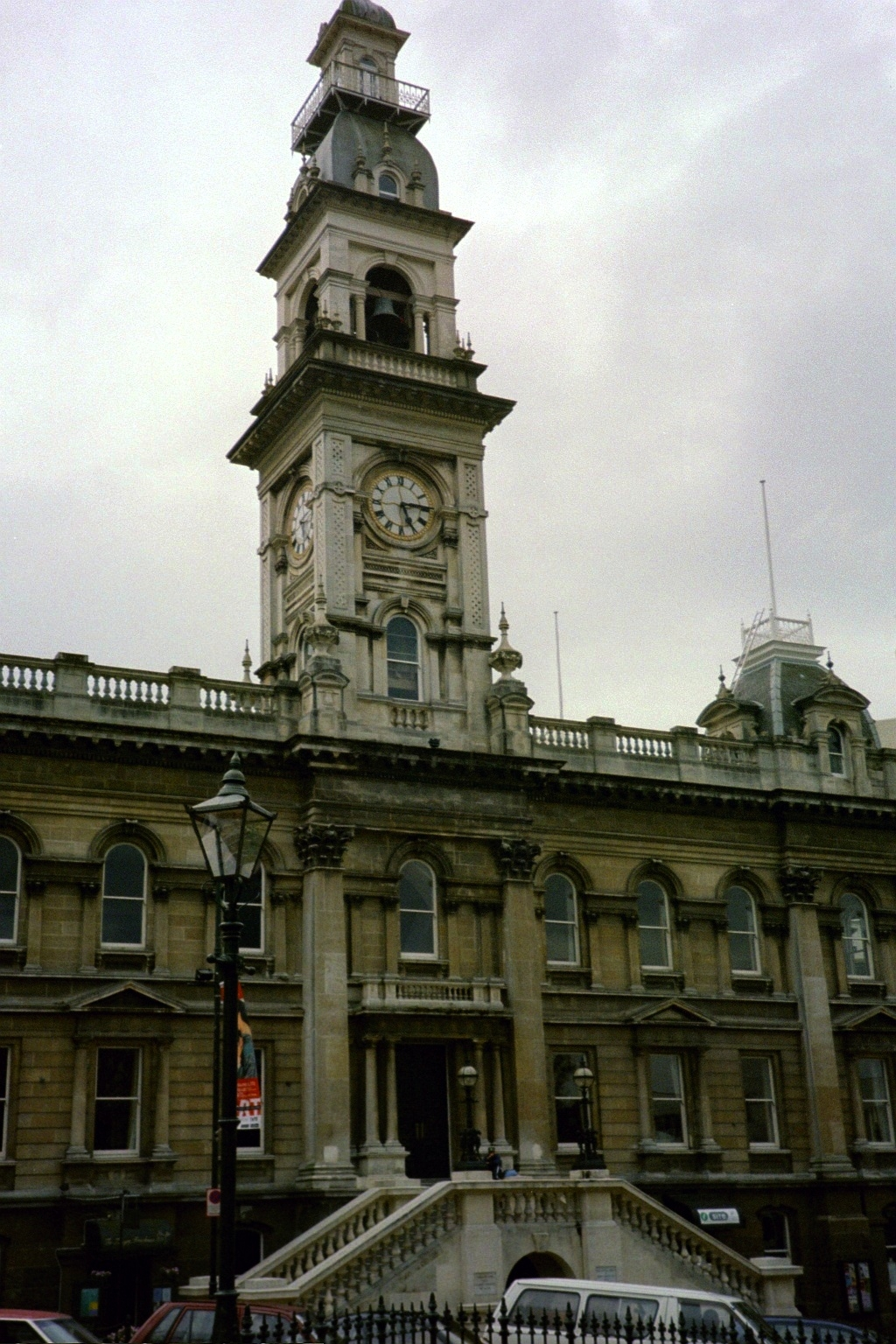
The first phase of construction included the Octagon facade.

This first building has three main storeys, the ground or basement constructed of Port Chalmers breccia with the floors above built of Oamaru limestone. There was a central entrance at the first floor level – the piano nobile in architectural terms - reached by a double flight of steps from the street. Above it there is a high tower of five more levels incorporating a clock, bells and a mansard roof. The four corners of the building also have mansard roofs. The tower is 47 metres (165 feet) to the base of the flagpole and is very prominent in central Dunedin. The building’s principal elevation still dominates the Octagon.

The inspiration of the design, or at least its main elevation, is Michelangelo’s for the Palazzo Senatorio on the Piazza del Campidoglio in Rome, the seat of the Roman civic government. With its corner mansard roofs and proportionately much higher tower, Lawson’s building also echoes the old civic halls of the Netherlands, and Flanders, the latter modern Belgium - for example, the Oudenaarde Town Hall. In this the design parallels George Gilbert Scott’s for St Pancras Station in London which similarly mingles Italian and north European elements in an eclectic mix.

The Sydney Town Hall, started in 1868, is a comparable mixture and its main elevation is broadly similar. So is that of the Philadelphia City Hall, started in 1871, although that is far larger, more exuberant and apparently French, and was ultimately completed to a very different plan. While probably aware of these other near contemporaries it is clear Lawson arrived at his own composition whose combination of grandeur and restraint seems characteristic.

The side elevations were dressed to be seen, like the Octagon frontage, sharing its tiers of pedimented and then arched windows, Corinthian pilasters, cornice and balustrade. The rear elevation was left clearly unfinished with bricked-in apertures intended to give access to the auditorium when it was built. A clock was ordered from Gillett & Bland of London, with its own peal of chimes, and was started on 2 December 1880. There was a fifty-year pause before a rearward extension was completed to a plan different from that which Lawson had envisaged.

=== Second phase ===
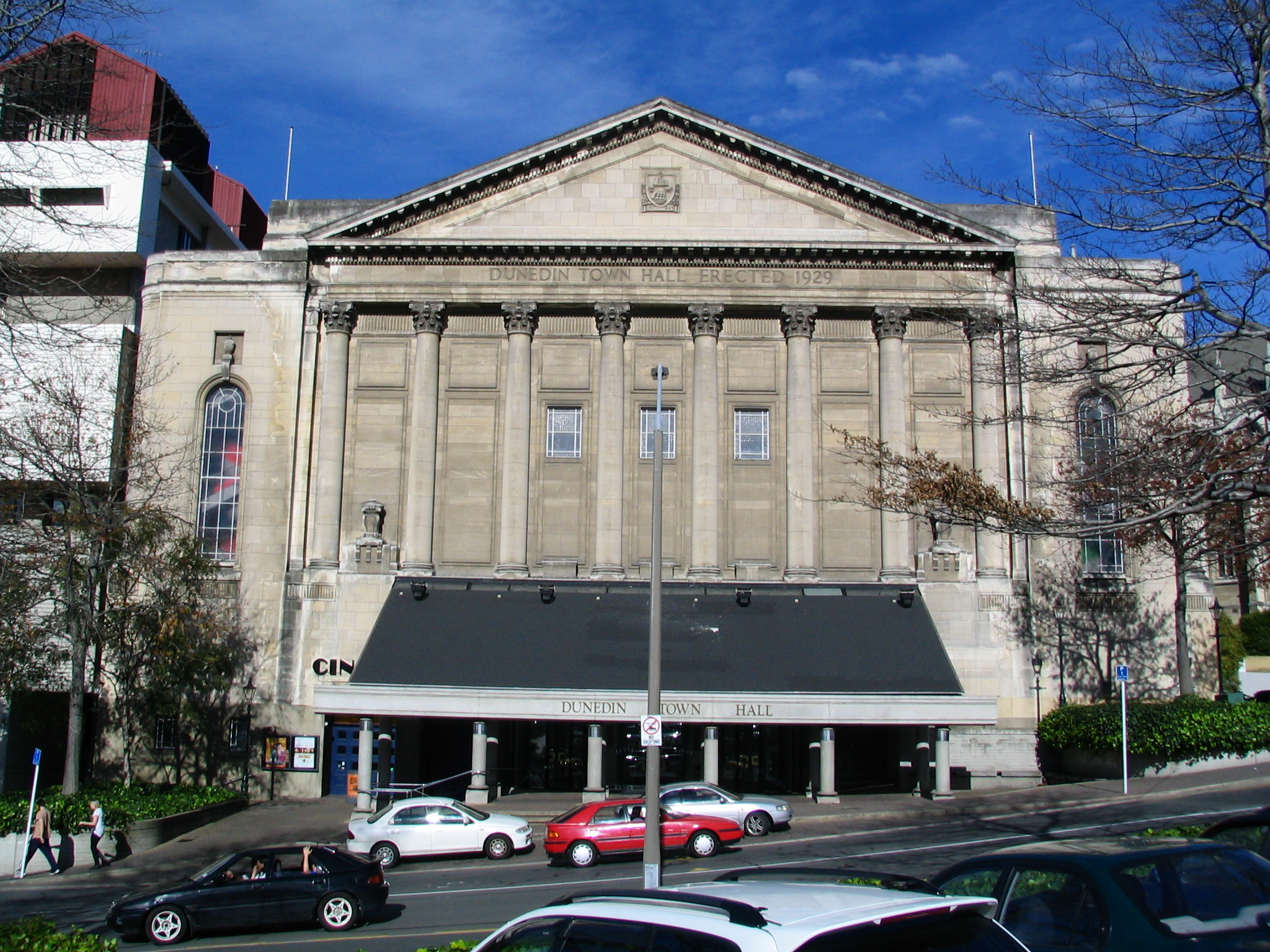
The second phase of construction included the main auditorium, at the building's Moray Place end.

In 1913 the city council held a competition for the design of the Town Hall, which was won by Harry Mandeno (1879–1973) in 1914. The winning design projected two auditoria each in its own compartment: one smaller, running transversely across the site immediately behind the Municipal Chambers; the other, larger, extending from there to Moray Place, oriented on the same north/south axis as the whole site from the Octagon. The smaller auditorium, then called the Concert Hall, was to seat 600 people. The larger was to seat 3,000. Although Mandeno's name was on the winning design, it is likely it was the work of Roy Fraser (1895–1972), then too young to enter the competition independently.

The First World War delayed progress, and in the early 1920s ratepayers voted against raising a loan to pay for the building. The city council's profits from its trading departments during the 1925-1926 New Zealand and South Seas International Exhibition enabled it to undertake the project and pay for it with cash. The plans were now modified explicitly by Mandeno's new partner Roy Fraser. Among other changes, the floor of the Concert Hall was lowered below that of the main auditorium and also below the first floor of the Municipal Chambers, thus placing a barrier between them. This impeded Lawson's intended entry from the Octagon to the spaces behind the Municipal Chambers, and generally made movement through the whole extended complex difficult. The foundation stone was laid on 3 March 1928 and the building was opened on 15 February 1930. The main auditorium was then, and remains, the largest in New Zealand.

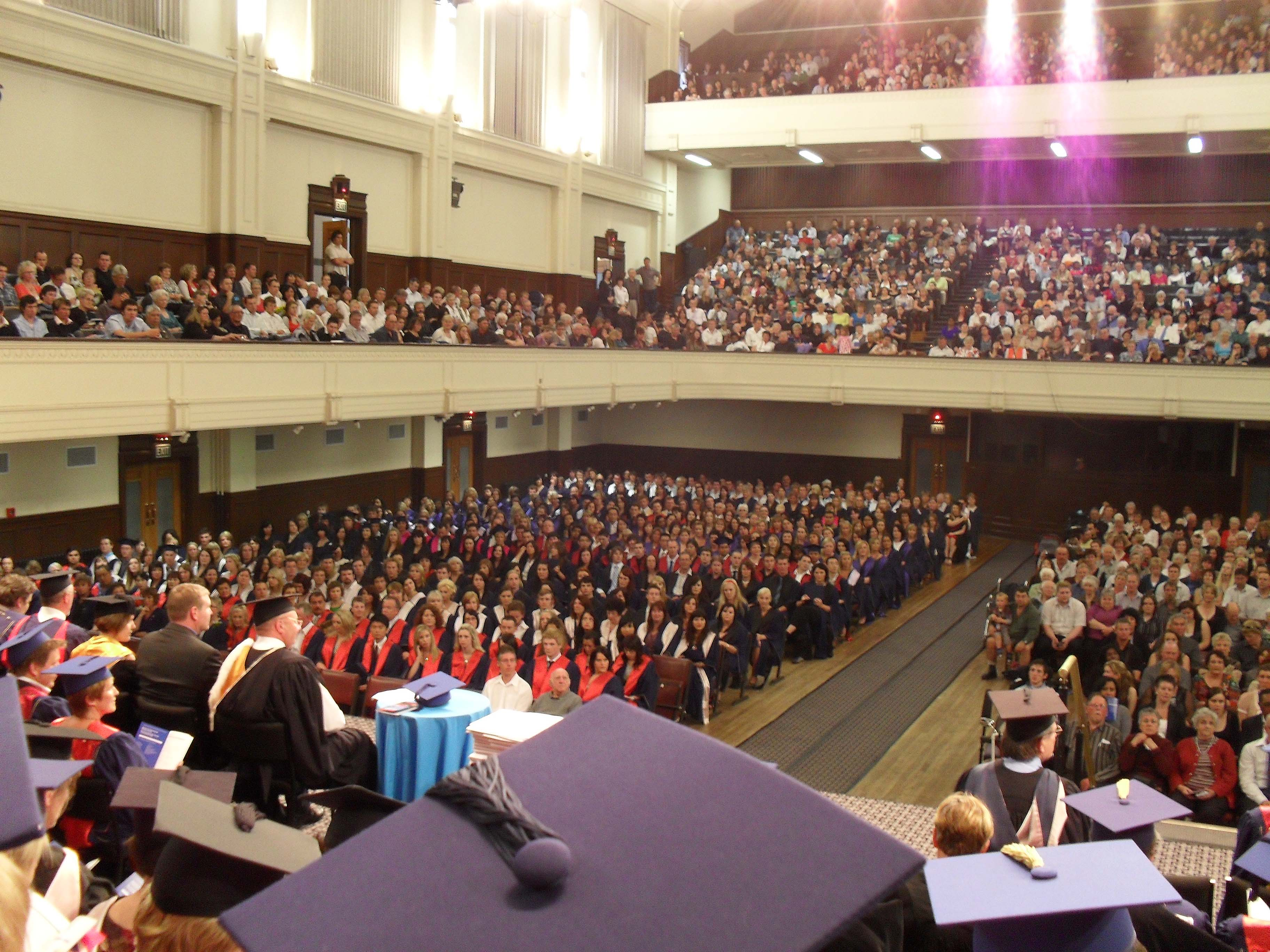
A graduation ceremony in the main auditorium

The building was constructed of steel-reinforced concrete with Oamaru limestone cladding and was intended to harmonise with the Municipal Chambers which it physically adjoins. The initial design employed a revived Baroque style. The later re-working simplified this, making it more austere and more purely classical. The main auditorium has a pillared and pedimented facade to Moray Place accommodating its principal entrance. Corner stairwells on the Moray Place front and comparable "towers" at the southward end give the main auditorium's building compartment a basilica-like form. The Concert Hall's entrance facade is more detailed, and more closely matches Lawson's Municipal Chambers whose west elevation it joins, making a successful transition to the plainer side of the main auditorium. The narrow Harrop Street flanks that western boundary of the whole complex while the eastern one, originally designed to be chiefly unseen, is bounded by the pedestrian walkway of Municipal Lane.

The main auditorium has two galleries above the ground floor, the first arranged as a long-sided U, and an organ, installed at the back of the stage. Its ground floor foyer has an impressive barrel-vaulted, coffered ceiling. The Concert Hall, long called the Concert Chamber, had a proscenium and a single gallery. Neither auditorium had a fly tower or an orchestra pit because they were designed primarily for musical performances. The project cost £86,000, exclusive of the organ.

=== Later building history ===
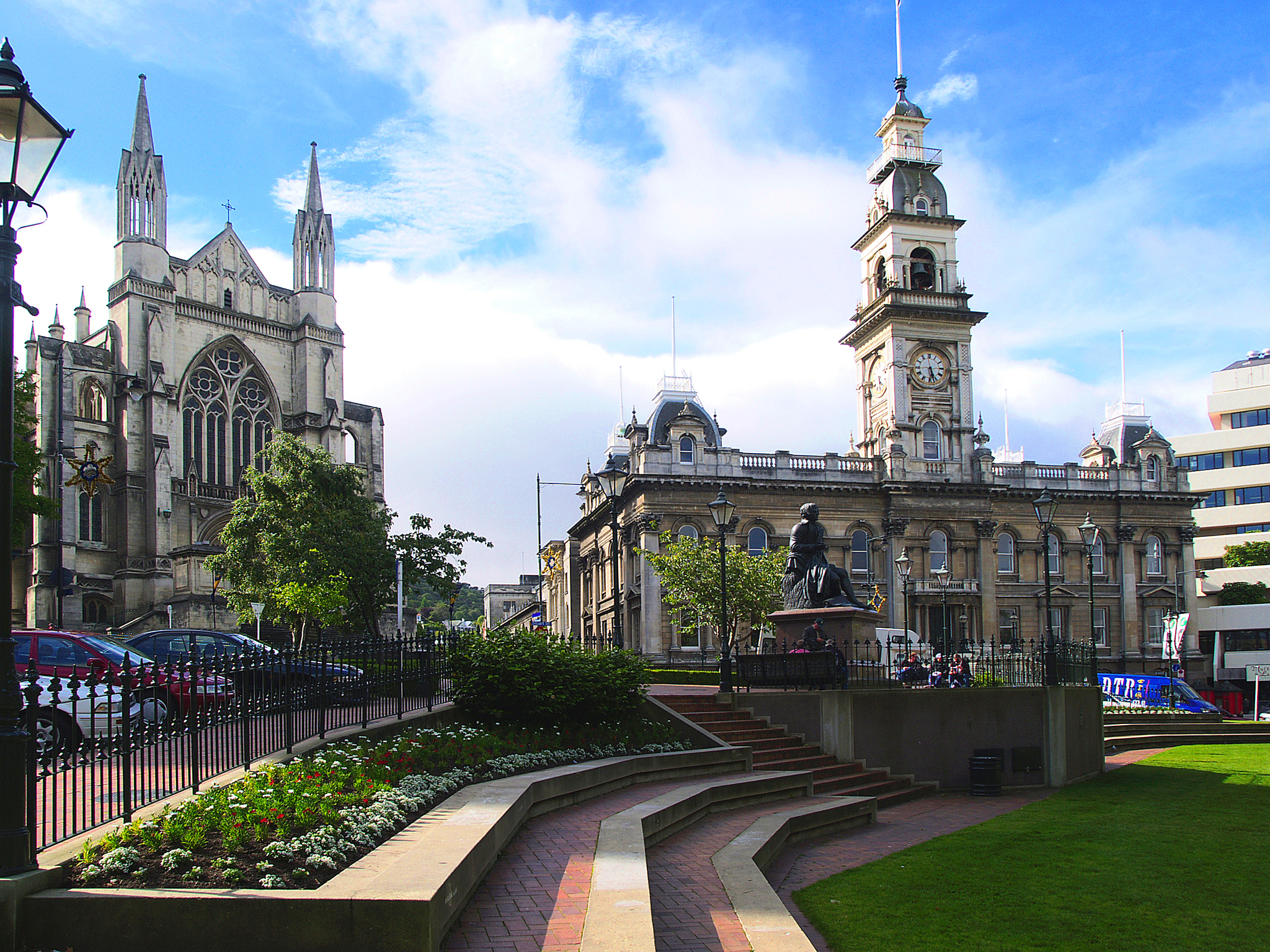
St. Paul's Anglican Cathedral and Dunedin Town Hall.

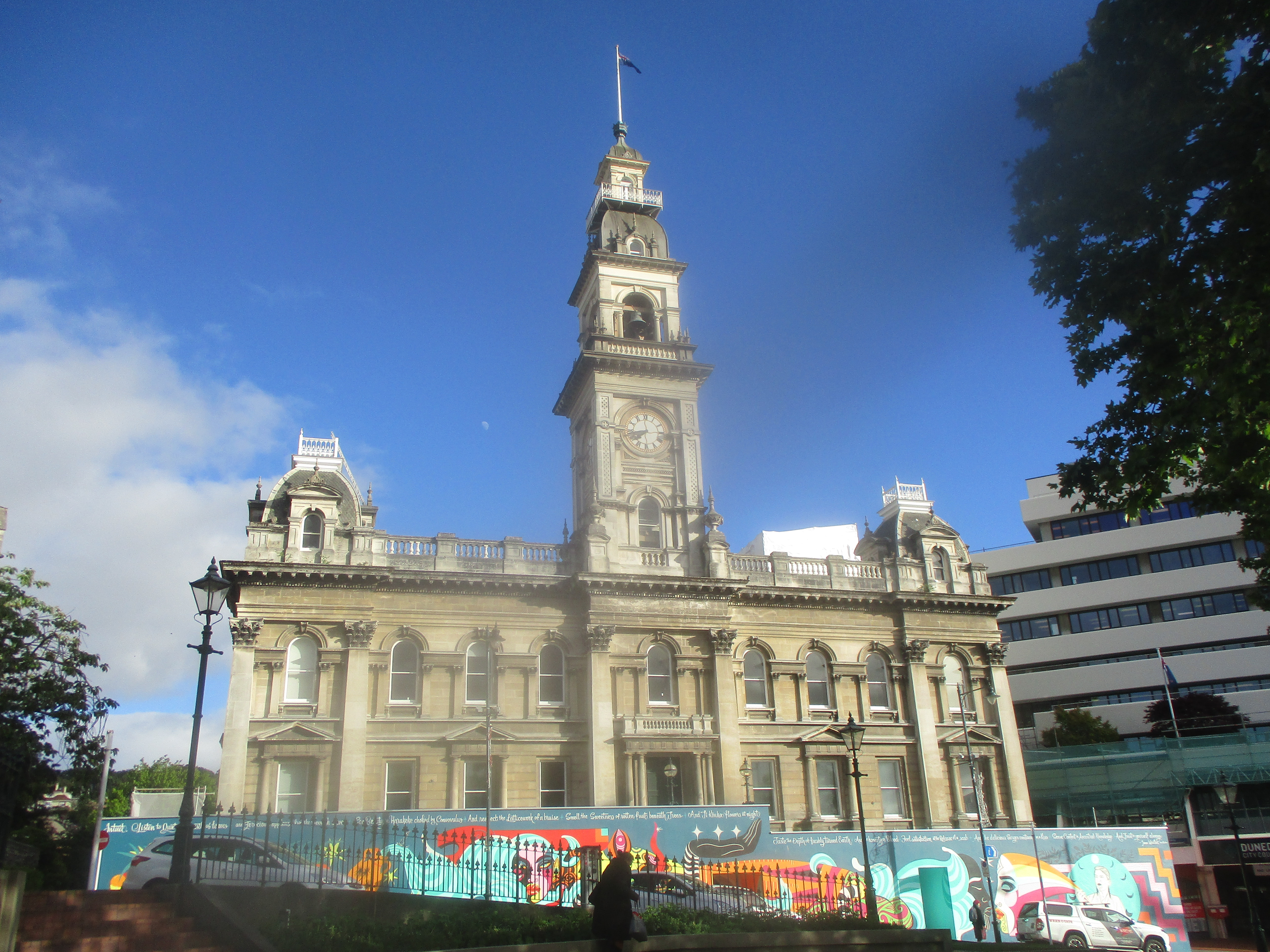

In 1939, the interior of Lawson’s building was remodelled. Lifts were installed and the exterior steps were removed and replaced with a balcony. Some time before 1955, two storeys were added to the southeast corner of the 1930 extension. In 1963, the top of the Municipal Chambers' tower was removed and replaced with a truncated aluminium cap, known as "the meat safe" ostensibly for reasons of safety, but in fact as a prelude to demolishing the whole of Lawson’s structure. This was controversial but plans to demolish the building continued to be entertained into the 1980s.

Nevertheless, the then city architect Bill Hesson (1929–2007) conceived a plan to redevelop the whole complex. The Concert Chamber was substantially modified and its seating capacity reduced to become the Glenroy Auditorium by a design of Hesson's when it was made part of a conference centre, the "Dunedin Centre", in 1985-88. The main auditorium was refurbished, but not substantially changed, and a new entrance was added at the foot of the Moray Place facade in 1988-1990. This entrance was designed by Tim Heath.

In a notable reversal of earlier intentions, in part brought about through public protest, Lawson’s building was now restored. Its tower and steps were replaced and its interiors thoroughly redecorated and retrofitted with modern servicing. This was done under the supervision of Hesson's successor as City Architect, Robert Tongue and was generally and critically well received. (It won the New Zealand Institute of Architects’ National Award in 1991.) The building was re-opened on 16 November 1989.

The Metro Cinema was incorporated into the basement of the main auditorium in the mid 1990s.

== Present plans for redevelopment ==
In the early 2000s a plan to enlarge the space available for conferences was developed. This envisaged building onto the western elevation across Harrop Street. After much public debate, this plan was abandoned in favour of making the additional provision by opening the compartment housing the Glenroy Auditorium internally into the adjacent Municipal Chambers. While further reducing the capacity of the Glenroy Auditorium this would also allow linear access through the whole extended complex from the Octagon to Moray Place at the level Lawson intended, the first floor of his Municipal Chambers. It thus mitigates the awkwardness introduced by placing the smaller compartment transversely across the site and the lower floor level of the smaller auditorium.

It is also proposed to remove Mr Heath's entrance on Moray Place and to replace it with a new glass-clad structure, set slightly apart from the building. The architect is Jeff Thompson. It was anticipated construction would start in 2010 and cost NZ$45.4 million. The Town Hall was set to be closed to events for twelve months from May 2010. The project was completed in 2015. The building has been through various renovations and restorations, including the restoration of the exterior which began in 2024.

== Comparisons and contrasts ==
The Dunedin Town Hall represents a type of municipal building characteristic of the mid 19th and early 20th centuries. Such structures provided civic offices, a council chamber and a large auditorium in one building and often had a clocktower. Most had an organ in the large auditorium and often a smaller auditorium for chamber music. The Dunedin building had all of these features and although its smaller auditorium is much reduced, they all survive.

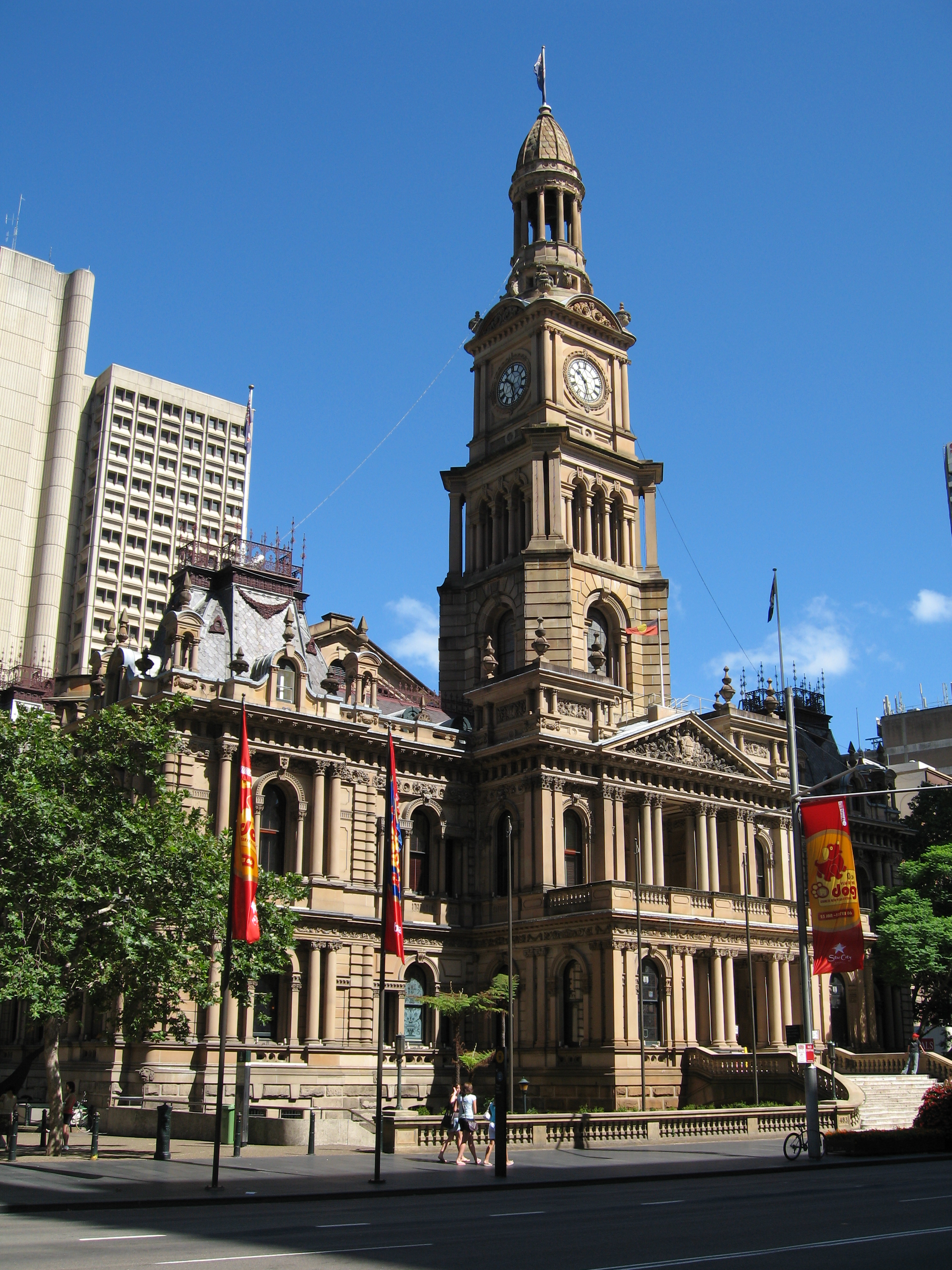
Sydney Town Hall has many similarities to its Dunedin equivalent.

Parallel buildings in Sydney and Philadelphia have been mentioned. Those structures’ principal elevations resemble Lawson’s Octagon facade, but other characteristics are different. Philadelphia City Hall extends to enclose a courtyard, while Sydney’s interior plan does not have the transverse compartment of Dunedin’s old Concert Chamber. The long gap between the Dunedin building’s two construction phases also produced a discernible disunity of styles. While Lawson’s Municipal Chambers might be described as Neo-Renaissance, Fraser’s additions are better characterised as understated Neo-Baroque.

In New Zealand the Wellington Town Hall and Auckland Town Hall are comparable. The Wellington building, designed by Joshua Charlesworth and built between 1901 and 1904 in a Neo-Renaissance style, has lost its clocktower and portico. The Auckland Town Hall, opened in 1911 and designed by the Melbourne firm JJ & EJ Clarke in a Renaissance Revival manner, is better preserved. Both are rather smaller than their Dunedin counterpart.

In Australia, apart from Sydney, the Adelaide Town Hall, built between 1863 and 1866 and designed by Edmund Wright and Edward Woods in a Neo-Renaissance style, is another parallel. Melbourne Town Hall is one too. Built on a corner site between 1870 and 1887 to a Second Empire design of Joseph Reed’s, it was extended in 1900, but a fire in 1925 destroyed much of it, including the main auditorium. The Perth Town Hall in Western Australia is another representative of the type, designed by Richard Roach Jewell and built between 1860 and 1870 in a revived Gothic style. To a lesser extent so too is the Hobart Town Hall, which has no tower. It was designed by Henry Hunter in an Italian classical manner and built between 1864 and 1866.

In Britain the Leeds Town Hall and Manchester Town Hall are notable comparable examples, while the Sheffield Town Hall is perhaps rather less so. Leeds was designed by Cuthbert Brodrick in a Second Empire style and built between 1853 and 1858. Manchester was built between 1868 and 1877 to Alfred Waterhouse’s Gothic Revival design. Sheffield is later, built between 1890 and 1897 in Jacobethan style, and was designed by E. W. Mountford.

Dunedin Town Hall’s features characterise its relatively large scale, considering the size of the city it serves; the unusually long gap between its construction phases; and the anesthetic Lawson's Octagon elevation. It also forms an townscape with its neighbour across Harrop Street, St. Paul's Cathedral.

== "Norma" ==
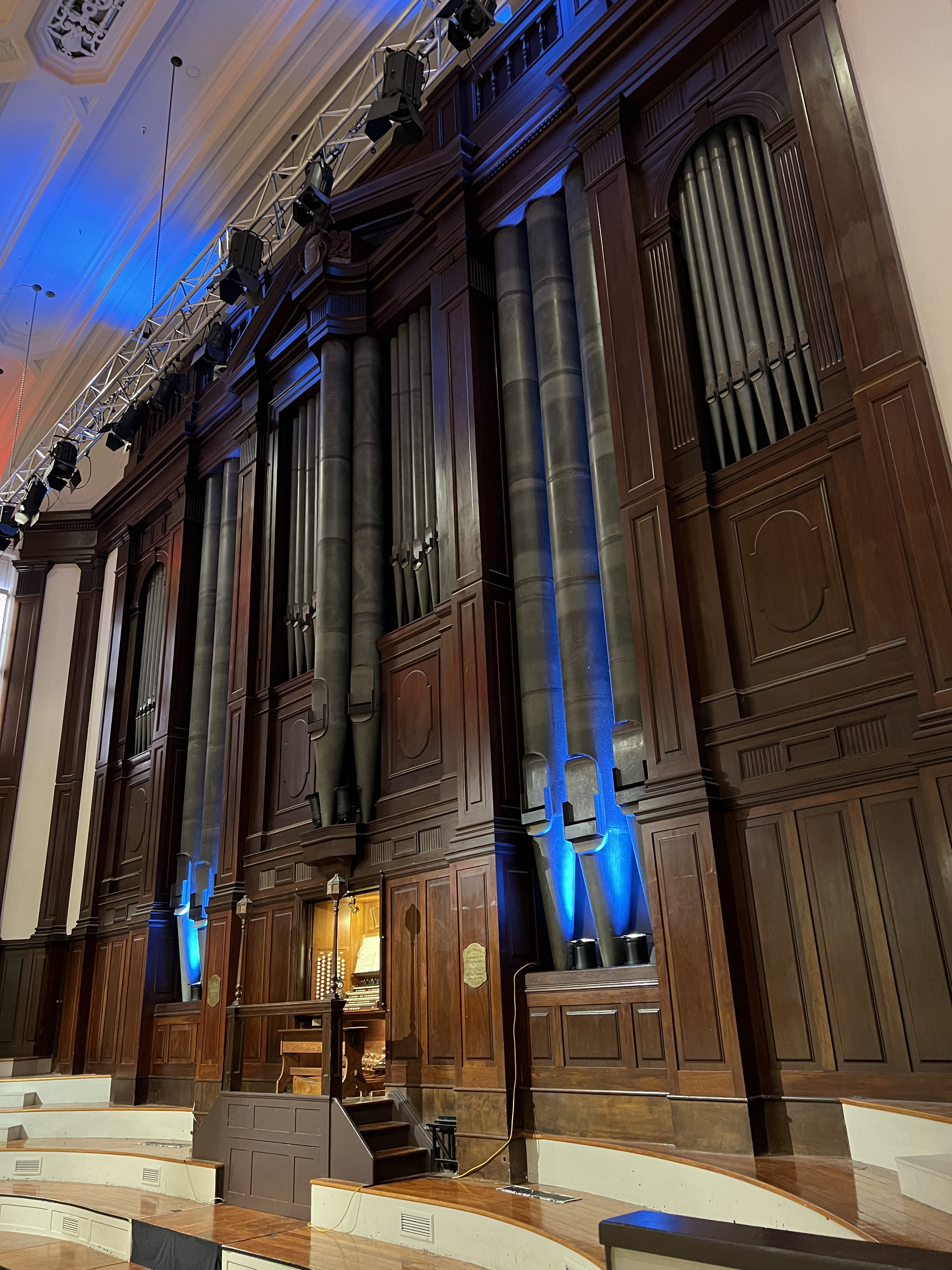
"Norma" the organ, photographed in June 2023.

The Concert Hall's symphonic organ, affectionately dubbed "Norma", was built in 1919 by William Hill and Son of London, and contains 3,500 pipes. Originally considerably smaller, though still an impressive 23 tons in weight, the instrument toured England and was set up in halls and theatres as part of a travelling vaudeville show. The organ was enlarged and installed at the British Empire Exhibition at Wembley in 1924, before being moved to Tunbridge Wells Opera House. From there, it was donated to Dunedin by Mr and Mrs A. S. Paterson at a cost to them of £16,000.

The organ has been extensively restored, and though care has been taken to ensure that the organ's sound has not been greatly altered, this restoration has included the upgrading of the console with the latest playing accessories.

== Sources ==
- "Building Improvements in the City" article in Otago Daily Times 6 February 1879 supplement p.a.
- "Dunedin Town Hall Competition" article in Progress April 1914.
- Herd, Joyce, and Griffiths, George J. (1980) Discovering Dunedin. Dunedin: John McIndoe.
- Jackie Gillies + Associates, Dunedin Town Hall, Conservation Report, June 2008, commissioned by the Dunedin City Council.
- Knight, Hardwicke and Wales, Niel (1988) Buildings of Dunedin. Dunedin: John McIndoe. ISBN 0-86868-106-7
- Ledgerwood, Norman (2008) The Heart of a City the Story of Dunedin's Octagon. Dunedin, NZ. ISBN 978-0-473-12989-7
- McFarlane, Shona (1970) Dunedin: Portrait of a City. Christchurch: Whitcombe and Tombs.
- McGill, David, and Sheehan, Grant (1997) Landmarks: Notable Historic Buildings of New Zealand. Auckland: Godwit Publishing. ISBN 1-86962-003-8
- Trotter, Olive (1994) Dunedin's Crowning Glory, the Town Clock Tower. Dunedin, NZ.
- Unknown, Town Hall, Dunedin. Conditions of Competition, Dunedin City Council, Dunedin, 1913.
